= The Bar-Steward Sons of Val Doonican discography =

This is a list of releases by The Bar-Steward Sons of Val Doonican, including studio and live albums, singles and other media.

== Moon-On-A-Stick Records ==
The band have independently released all of their recorded output via their own label, Moon-On-A-Stick Records. The name of the label was derived from a comedy sketch by comedians Stewart Lee & Richard Herring in the second BBC television series of Fist Of Fun.

== Early albums ('The Covers Years' 2007–2009) ==
The band have independently released several studio albums. Almost all of the artwork for the front covers of the band’s studio albums are pastiches of classic album covers, created by Scott Doonican.

The first two studio releases contained cover versions played on folk instruments.

=== For Those About To Rock... But Gently ===
Released in 2007, the band's debut album is a collection of rock cover versions played on folk instruments, including recordings from their 2006 debut EP, BBC Radio Sheffield interviews and a live set from Sheffield City Hall (where the band supported Norma Waterson and Eliza Carthy with The Gift Band). Typical of the band's D.I.Y. ethos, it was released independently on CD-R discs burned from Scott Doonican's home laptop computer. The cover artwork is a pastiche of For Those About To Rock by AC/DC.

=== Back To The Day Job ===
Released in 2009, it is an album of cover versions of Number 1 hits (a Number 1 song for each year of the 1980s) played on folk instruments. It was released independently on burned CD-R discs. Its artwork is the only studio album that isn't a pastiche of a classic album cover and features the band working behind a cocktail bar (a reference to The Human League's Don't You Want Me which features on the album) and a suggestion that the members are Bar-Stewards.

== Comedy albums ('The Parody Years' 2010–present) ==
Since 2010, the band's main focus has been musical parody, performed predominantly on folk instruments.

=== Cpl. Kipper's Barnsley Trades Club Turn ===
Originally released in 2010, Cpl Kipper is the band's only 'concept' album. It features songs about their home town of Barnsley, its inhabitants and its culture. The cover artwork is a pastiche of Sgt Pepper's Lonely Hearts Club Band by The Beatles, and features Barnsley celebrities alongside the original line-up of Scott Doonican, Danny Doonican and Alan Doonican #1 in the place of The Beatles, who are also accompanied by Val Doonican (who replaces Paul McCartney). The album contains parodies of Sgt. Pepper's Lonely Hearts Club Band and A Day In The Life.

=== The Dark Side Of The Tarn ===
After the departure of Danny Doonican in early 2011, the band's follow-up was mostly a solo effort from Scott Doonican, and written by Scott Doonican and Amanda White, with minor musical recording contributions from Alan Doonican #1 and Andy Doonican on a couple of tracks. The cover artwork is a pastiche of The Dark Side of the Moon by Pink Floyd and opens with a parody of Money and closes with a parody of Shine On You Crazy Diamond by Pink Floyd.

=== Ey Up! Let's Go! ===
Released on 17 March 2012, the cover artwork is a pastiche of The Ramones' eponymous debut, featuring the line-up of Scott Doonican, Alan Doonican #1 and Andy Doonican. It opens with a parody of The Ramones' Blitzkrieg Bop. It also contains the band's regular live show finale, Jump Ararnd, a parody of House Of Pain's Jump Around.

=== The Bar-Stewards And Friends' Christmas Cracker ===
Released on 7 December 2012, the cover artwork is a pastiche of We Wish You A Merry Christmas, a 1968 compilation 7 inch E.P. featuring Julie Andrews, Vic Damone, Jack Jones and Marian Anderson. This compilation album features tracks from The Bar-Steward Sons of Val Doonican, Scott Doonican and the supporting cast of the first incarnation of The Bar-Steward Sons of Val Doonican's Christmas Rock n Roll Circus live show which took place annually in Barnsley between 2012 and 2023.

=== Sat'day Neet Fever ===
Released in 2013, the album is noteworthy for containing the band's most requested song, The Lady In Greggs, a parody of The Lady In Red by Chris De Burgh. The cover artwork is a pastiche of the Original Motion Picture Soundtrack to Saturday Night Fever with Scott Doonican, Alan Doonican #1 and Andy Doonican in the place of the Bee Gee's and an elderly Val Doonican on the dance floor in the place of John Travolta. It also contains parodies of The Bee Gee's Night Fever and Stayin' Alive.

=== Talk Of The Tarn ===
Released in May 2014, the cover artwork is a pastiche of News Of The World by the rock band Queen, with the line-up of Scott Doonican, Alan Doonican #1 and Andy Doonican being killed by a giant version of Barnsley sculptor, Graham Ibbeson's sculpture of cricketing umpire Dickie Bird. It was the final album from this, the band's second line-up. Alan Doonican #1 left the band in September 2014. Unusually, unlike other studio parody albums by the band, the album didn't contain any parodies of Queen songs, but did contain a cover-version of Queen's Somebody To Love as a hidden track.

=== The Tarn Machine ===
Released in 2015 by the lineup of Scott Doonican, Björn Doonicansson, Alan Doonican #2 and Andy Doonican, it was later re-recorded and re-released 2019 as part of The Leap of Faith Project by Scott, Björn and Alan #2. The cover artwork is a pastiche of The Man Machine by Kraftwerk and it contains parodies of Kraftwerk's The Model and The Robots. Both the 2015 and 2019 releases were issued on CD, but in 2025, Scott Doonican reissued it on vinyl too.

=== T'Chronicle ===
Released in 2016 as a limited edition album commemorating 10 years of The Bar-Steward Sons of Val Doonican, featuring rare live recordings spanning those years and archive interview footage with band members past and present. The cover artwork is a pastiche of The Miracle by Queen, with the heads of Scott Doonican, Björn Doonicansson, Alan Doonican #2 and Andy Doonican merged into one large head. It was sent to fans as a surprise bonus album that accompanied the studio album T'South 0 - Tarn 4 which had been crowd-funded.

=== T'South 0 - Tarn 4 ===
Released in 2016 by the lineup of Scott Doonican, Björn Doonicansson, Alan Doonican #2 and Andy Doonican, it was later re-recorded and re-released 2019 as part of The Leap of Faith Project by Scott, Björn and Alan #2. The cover artwork is a pastiche of London 0 - Hull 4 by The Housemartins, and it contains a parodies of The Housemartins' Happy Hour, Caravan Of Love and The Beautiful South's I'll Sail This Ship Alone. Both the 2016 and 2019 releases were issued on CD, but in 2025, Scott Doonican reissued it on vinyl too.

=== Ave It: Bold As Brass ===
Released in 2017, it was the first of several albums to be mixed and mastered by Joel Howe. The cover artwork is a pastiche of Axis : Bold As Love by The Jimi Hendrix Experience, featuring the line-up of Scott Doonican, Björn Doonicansson and Alan Doonican #2. The album opens with a parody of Hendrix's Crosstown Traffic, which features electric guitar performed by Graham Oliver, founder-member of heavy metal band Saxon. Oliver joins the band again on one of the album's two hidden tracks, a cover of Saxon's Wheels Of Steel. The original release was issued on CD, but in 2025, Scott Doonican reissued it on vinyl too.

=== The Bar-Steward Sons of Val Doonican/2008-2018 ===
A 22 track greatest hits compilation released in 2018. The songs were all re-recorded by the line-up of Scott Doonican, Björn Doonicansson and Alan Doonican #2. The cover artwork is a pastiche of The Beatles 1962-1966. It was initially released on CD, and after a successful crowdfunding campaign, it was the first of the band's independent releases to be glass mastered rather than burned to CD-R compact discs. It is notable for having a hidden track in the pre-gap before Track 1, where listeners need to press the rewind button to access it. It was later released on double disc LP on transparent red vinyl, and on an extremely limited edition cassette with sleeve artwork that is a pastiche of the cover of Queen's Greatest Hits II (only 21 copies exist).

=== Place Of Spades ===
Released in 2019, by the line-up of Scott Doonican, Björn Doonicansson and Alan Doonican #2, the cover artwork is a pastiche of Ace Of Spades by Motorhead and opens with a parody of the same track, featuring guest appearances from Graham Oliver from heavy metal band Saxon on lead guitar, and Hugh Whitaker from The Housemartins on drums. The album is notable for having not one, but three hidden tracks (all three members of the band sing one each).

=== Cpl. Kipper's Barnsley Trades Club Turn - 10th Anniversary Version ===
Released in October 2020, the whole of the band's original debut 'concept' album was re-recorded by Scott Doonican between 2018 and 2020 with additional instrumentation from Björn Doonicansson and Alan Doonican #2 recorded in 2020 on time for the album's tenth anniversary. The updated cover artwork is still a pastiche of Sgt Pepper's Lonely Hearts Club Band by The Beatles, and features Barnsley celebrities alongside the line-up of Scott Doonican, Björn Doonicansson and Alan Doonican #2 in the place of The Beatles, along with the various contributors to the album. The album contains parodies of Sgt. Pepper's Lonely Hearts Club Band (including the reprise - notably absent from the original album) and A Day In The Life. The album was started by Scott Doonican initially in 2018 around the time that the band was recording Place Of Spades but didn't reach the public until October 2020 when the coronavirus pandemic of that year forced the band to take a hiatus from live shows. The album was mostly recorded, mixed and mastered remotely from the participants' home studios, yet still features a host of special guests, including folk musicians Eliza Carthy, Kate Rusby, Kathryn Roberts, Dave Burland and Mike Harding, Graham Oliver from the heavy metal band Saxon, former drummer with The Housemartins, Hugh Whitaker, Barnsley-based broadcaster and poet Ian McMillan, Scott Doonican's late father-in-law Michael White and many others. The album was crowd-funded by fans of the band under the moniker of the 'Leap of Faith II project', where fans didn't know what they would receive for their pledge money. The final CD album release saw the inclusion of a Scott Doonican authored book that featured the lyrics of all of the songs, along with the stories behind them and intricate 'recording notes' that discuss the recording, mixing and mastering process involved in bringing the ten year old album up-to-date. In 2025, Scott Doonican reissued the album on vinyl.

=== Rugh & Ryf ===
Released in 2022, by the line-up of Scott Doonican, Björn Doonicansson and Alan Doonican #2, the cover artwork is a pastiche of Liege & Lief by Fairport Convention. The remaining members of Fairport Convention's Liege & Lief line-up approved of the band's parody. Liege & Lief is Middle English for 'Loyal & Ready'. 'Rugh & Ryf' is Middle English for 'Rough & Ready'. The album was crowd-funded by fans who received their physical copies a month earlier than the launch date of 29 May 2022 with strict instructions on the mailers they were not to be opened until 1 May. The band held a Listening Party for those who had pre-ordered the album on 1 May, only for fans to realise that the opening line of the opening track is "Bank Holiday, the 1st of May, is the best one of the year".

=== Evolver ===
Released in 2025 by the Mk.IV line-up of Scott Doonican, Alan Doonican #2, Mo-Jo Doonican, Dave Doonican and Rt. Rev. Jeremiah Rickenbacker Doonican III, the album cover is a pastiche of Revolver by The Beatles. On its release on 20 September 2025, At The Barrier's review of the new release stated that, "Evolver is a brilliant record for this freshly tank-topped era of The Bar-Steward Sons. The evolution is less than gentle as the new line-up delivers a great set of new songs in impeccable fashion, moving the band forward." The album was launched with an online listening party via the band's YouTube page, which featured the band playing the entire album via 14 performance videos and a series of interviews with puppet character Gloria McGlumpher, voiced by Scott's partner, Amanda White. The album received further critical acclaim from RnR Magazine in January 2026, for its "clever wordplay, sharp satire and plenty of Yorkshire wit... it's hard enough to do this stuff as a one-off; to repeat the feat over multiple albums is surely the work of twisted genius. Evolver is a highly entertaining, brilliantly executed update from a band who could easily rest on their laurels - but don't"

== Live albums ==
The band have released many live recordings, some of which have been released on CD, and some of which were exclusively made for a digital-only release. Some of the artwork for the front covers of the band’s live releases are pastiches of classic album covers (in several cases, classic live albums) .

- The Bar-Steward Sons of Val Doonican Rock… But Gently (2007) recorded live at The Barley Mow, Bonsall, Derbyshire.
- With The Doonicans (2008) recorded live at The Lantern Theatre, Sheffield, South Yorkshire. The cover artwork is a pastiche of With The Beatles by The Beatles.
- Rock ‘N’ Roll Circus (2009) recorded live at The Academy Theatre, Birdwell, Barnsley, South Yorkshire. The cover artwork is a pastiche of The Rolling Stones' Rock & Roll Circus.
- Live In Holmfirth (2009) recorded live at The Picturedrome, Holmfirth, West Yorkshire. The cover artwork is a pastiche of Live At Leeds by The Who.
- Live At The Lantern (2009) recorded live at The Lantern Theatre, Sheffield, South Yorkshire.
- Back To The 80s - LIVE! (2010) recorded live at The Lantern Theatre, Sheffield, South Yorkshire.
- A Neet Art Of Tarn (2011) recorded live at The Blues Bar, Harrogate, North Yorkshire. The cover artwork is a pastiche of A Night At The Opera by Queen.
- In A Beautiful Daze At Beautiful Days (2012) recorded live at Beautiful Days Festival 2012, Devon.
- A Crazy, Crazy Neet At t’Blues (2012) recorded live at The Blues Bar, Harrogate, North Yorkshire. The cover artwork is a pastiche of A Day At The Races by Queen.
- Bootlegged At Bearded Theory (2013) recorded live at Bearded Theory Festival 2013, Derbyshire.
- Live At Jim’s Records (The Secret Uke Gigs) Vol. I & II (2013) recorded live at Jim's Records, Barnsley, South Yorkshire.
- Christmas Rock ‘N’ Roll Circus (2013) recorded live at The Electric Theatre, Barnsley, South Yorkshire.
- It’ll Be Reight (2014) recorded live at Harefield Hall, Pateley Bridge, North Yorkshire. The cover artwork is a pastiche of Let It Be by The Beatles.
- Bar-Stewards: Big, Bouncy & Bootlegged In Black & White At Beautiful Days (2014) recorded live at Beautiful Days Festival 2014, Devon.
- Forty-One Minute Party People (2014) recorded live at Club Academy, Manchester. The cover artwork is a pastiche of It's Great When You're Straight... Yeah! by Black Grape.
- Christmas Rock ‘N’ Roll Circus (2014) recorded live at The Electric Theatre, Barnsley, South Yorkshire.
- No Sleep ‘Til Watchet (2015) recorded live at Watchet Music Festival 2015, Somerset. The cover artwork is a pastiche of No Sleep 'Til Hammersmith by Motorhead.
- The Tarn Machine LIVE! (2015) recorded live at The Old School House Venue (then 'Barnsley Rock & Blues'), Barnsley, South Yorkshire. The cover artwork is a pastiche of The Man Machine by Kraftwerk.
- Something Funny Happened On The Way To The Forum (2015) recorded live at The Forum, Barrow-In-Furness, Cumbria.
- Live In Lancashire (2016) recorded live at The Continental, Preston, Lancashire.
- 10 (2016) recorded live at The Old School House Venue, Barnsley, South Yorkshire. The cover artwork is a pastiche of the Queen coat of arms that adorns the cover of Queen's Greatest Hits II.
- Hot August Night (2016) recorded live at Watchet Music Festival 2016, Somerset. The cover artwork is a pastiche of Hot August Night by Neil Diamond.
- Get Yer Ha-Ha’s Art! (2016) recorded live at The Lantern Theatre, Sheffield, South Yorkshire. The cover artwork is a pastiche of Get Yer Ya-Ya's Out! by The Rolling Stones.
- School’s Art (2017) recorded live at The Old School House Venue, Barnsley, South Yorkshire. The cover artwork is a pastiche of School's Out by Alice Cooper.
- Live & Lairy At Fairport’s Cropredy Convention (2018) recorded live at Fairport's Cropredy Convention 2018, Oxfordshire.
- Avalon Calling (2019) recorded live at Glastonbury Festival 2019, Somerset. The cover artwork is a pastiche of London Calling by The Clash.
- Live At The Palace Theatre (2019) recorded live at Palace Theatre, Redditch 25 October 2019, includes DVD of the same show. The cover artwork is a pastiche of Monty Python Live At Drury Lane.
- The Shed Sessions (2020) recorded live on Alan Doonican's allotment in Whitwell, Derbyshire on 19 June 2020. The outdoor show was performed in front of an audience of just 15 people, who were socially distanced due to the worldwide coronavirus pandemic. It was also filmed for inclusion in Scott Doonican's weekly online 'lockdown livestream' show Scott Doonican's BIG NEET IN, which was broadcast throughout that summer. The cover artwork is a pastiche of Motorhead's eponymous debut album.
- Only us, Keith Richards and cockroaches left (2020) released digitally via Bandcamp during the Coronavirus pandemic, the album was recorded live in Watchet, Somerset in June 2019. The cover artwork is a pastiche of Brothers by The Black Keys.
- The Bar-Steward Sons of Val Doonican's Sunday Service (2021) released digitally via Bandcamp during the Coronavirus pandemic, the album was recorded live at Beautiful Days Festival, Devon in August 2019.
- Ecky Thump (2021) released digitally via Bandcamp during the Coronavirus pandemic, the album was recorded live at Underneath The Stars Festival on 1 August 2021. The cover artwork is a pastiche of Icky Thump by The White Stripes.
- The Pint & Puppet Sessions (2021) released digitally via Bandcamp. The album was recorded live in Scott's home pub, 'The Pint & Puppet', built in his garage during the Coronavirus lockdown. Video footage of these sessions was aired over several episodes of Scott Doonican's BIG NEET IN via the band's YouTube channel.
- The Bar-Steward Sons of Val Doonican Live At Fairport's Cropredy Convention 2018 & 2022 (2022) Recorded live at Fairport's Cropredy Convention in 2018 and 2022. The cover artwork is an original painting of the band created by American artist Paine Proffitt.
- Welcome To The Congregation: The Bar-Steward Sons of Val Doonican's Sunday Service (2022) released digitally via Bandcamp and also as a limited edition 'Official Bootleg' especially for the band's THE BIG DAY OUT Festival. The album was recorded live at Beautiful Days Festival, Devon in August 2022.
- Welcome 2 The Congregation: The Bar-Steward Sons of Val Doonican's Sunday Service (2023) released digitally via Bandcamp. The album was recorded live at Beautiful Days Festival, Devon in August 2023. It was to be the final live release from the Mk. III line-up.
- Doonicans In Concert (2024) released on CD, the Mk.IV line-up of the band's debut show was recorded live at the Rescue Rooms in Nottingham on 10 February 2024. The album came with a free download code that included exclusive access to demos of the five-piece line-up rehearsing for their first show. The cover artwork is a pastiche of Deep Purple In Concert by Deep Purple.
- Doonicans In Rock (2025) released on double disc purple transparent vinyl and CD, and recorded live at Chipping Norton Theatre (Sides A & B) and Glastonbury Festival (Sides C & D). The album was crowdfunded by fans as the band's fifth 'Leap of Faith Project'. The cover artwork, created by artist Lewis Ryan and Scott Doonican is a pastiche of Deep Purple In Rock by Deep Purple. The album is dedicated to Scott Doonican's late brother Matthew, who is heard via a posthumous audio message over the P.A. system at the beginning of the Glastonbury side of the album.

== Scott Doonican solo albums ==
Scott Doonican also performs in a solo capacity, often performing songs from his band's discography on acoustic guitar, ukulele/banjulele and a OM27 Suzuki Omnichord. Occasionally he will add some cover versions of other artists' songs too. His live shows take more of a storytelling format, in which the stories behind the songs are divulged too. As well as working solo, he continues to perform alongside his partner Amanda, during their more sporadic online shows that began during a 67 consecutive week period during the coronavirus pandemic between 2020-2021. These Big Neet In online shows have spawned four studio albums as well as three live recordings too.

- Me, a geetar, a uke & some daft songs (2013) recorded live at The Fitzwilliam Arms, Elsecar, Barnsley.
- No Rest For The Stupid (2014) a studio album.
- One Man Show (2015) recorded live at The Lantern Theatre, Sheffield, South Yorkshire.
- One Man Show Too (2016) recorded live at The Lantern Theatre, Sheffield, South Yorkshire.
- One Man Show III (2017) recorded live at The Lantern Theatre, Sheffield, South Yorkshire.

The cover artwork for all three One Man Show albums are a pastiche of Mike Harding's 1976 One Man Show album.

- Bar-Steward Vol. 4 (2015) The cover artwork is a pastiche of Black Sabbath Vol. 4 by Black Sabbath.
- A Good Time... Not A Long Time (2016) a studio album of cover versions.
- A Live Album Recorded 13/08/17 and Produced The Next Day (2017) recorded live at Farmer Phil's Festival 2017, Shropshire. The cover artwork is a pastiche of The Next Day by David Bowie.
- The Very, Very, Very, Very, Very, Very, Very, Very, Very, Very, Very, Very, Very, Very, Very, Very Dark Blue Album (2018) The cover artwork is a pastiche of the fictional Smell The Glove by Spinal Tap.
- Scott Doonican Rocks, But Gently (2018) The cover artwork is a pastiche of Val Doonican Rocks, But Gently by Val Doonican.
- Scott Doonican's Big Neet In - The Album (2020)
- Scott Doonican's Big Neet In - The Big #2 (2021)
- One Man Show - Bar-Steward Vol. 4 (2021)
- Scott Doonican's Big Neet In - Socially Distanced Collaborations of the Third Kind (2021)
- Scott Doonican's Big Neet Out (2021)
- Your Evening Of Folk Has Been Cancelled (2022) recorded live at Crookes Folk Club in Sheffield. The cover artwork is a pastiche of Urge For Offal by Half Man Half Biscuit.
- Scott Doonican live at Cabaret Boom Boom (2022) recorded live at the Ruskin Hall in Sheffield. The cover artwork is a pastiche of the artwork for Cabaret: Original Sound Track Recording from the 1972 movie starring Liza Minnelli.
- Scott Doonican's Big Neet Out #2 (2022)
- Scott Doonican's Big Neet In - The Wee E.P. (2022)
- On Air With Scott Doonican (2023) 90-minutes of solo radio interviews and session performances on Penistone FM.
- Soup (2023) Scott Doonican recorded live at Katie Fitzgerald's in Stourbridge. This album was released on both CD and vinyl. The album cover is a pastiche of Andy Warhol's Campbell's Soup tins artwork.
- Scott Doonican's Big Neet Out #3 (2023)
- Five Live EP (2023)
- Marmite (2024) Scott Doonican recorded live at The Guildhall in Lichfield, Katie Fitzgerald's in Stourbridge and The Lantern Theatre in Sheffield. The album cover is a pastiche of Andy Warhol's artwork for the cover of The Velvet Underground & Nico' s debut album. The interactive cover features a jar of Marmite with a peelable sticker that reveals a pair of QR codes for hidden online bonus features.
- Scott Doonican Live At Pompey MMXXV (2025) Scott Doonican recorded live at the Square Tower in Portsmouth. The album cover is a pastiche of the cover for Pink Floyd: Live at Pompeii. The album features a more extensive storytelling style as well as the Doonicans' trademark parody songs.
- The Dark Side of the Tarn Redux (2026) Scott Doonican went back to the original tapes of the band's second comedy album to give it a fifteenth anniversary re-recording.
- Magical History Tour (2026) Scott Doonican tells the story of The Bar-Steward Sons of Val Doonican to celebrate the band's 20th Anniversary. The album was released on 17th June 2026 to coincide with the twentieth anniversary of their first show. The album cover is a pastiche of Magical Mystery Tour by The Beatles.

== Vinyl releases ==
- Tarnlife (b/w Ace Of Spades & Bar-Steward Bop) (2013) vinyl-only release 7" single
- Bestest Bits (2013) red transparent vinyl-only release LP
- Bestest Bits Vol. II (2015) red transparent vinyl-only release LP. The cover artwork for both Bestest Bits Vol. I & II are pastiches of Cheap Thrills by Big Brother and the Holding Company.
- Scott Doonican’s Big 7 Inch - Massage In A Brothel (b/w The Man Who Sold The World) (2015) vinyl-only release 7" single
- The Devil Went Darn To Barnsley (b/w When Love Runs Out Of Time) (2015) vinyl-only release 7" single
- The Bar-Stewards' Big 7 Inch: Jump Ararnd/The Lady In Greggs (2018) pink vinyl-only release 7" single
- The Bar-Steward Sons of Val Doonican/2008-2018 (2018) red transparent vinyl double LP. The cover artwork is a pastiche of The Beatles 1962-1966 by The Beatles.
- Avalon Calling - The Bar-Steward Sons of Val Doonican Live At Glastonbury Festival (2020) pink vinyl double LP. The cover artwork is a pastiche of London Calling by The Clash.
- Soup (2023) - Scott Doonican recorded live at Katie Fitzgerald's in Stourbridge. The album cover is a pastiche of Andy Warhol's Campbell's Soup tins artwork.
- Doonicans In Rock (2025) - The Bar-Steward Sons of Val Doonican recorded live at Chipping Norton Theatre in April 2024 (Sides A & B) and Glastonbury Festival in June 2024 (Sides C & D). The album was crowdfunded by fans as the band's fifth 'Leap of Faith Project' and released on transparent purple vinyl. The cover artwork, created by artist Lewis Ryan and Scott Doonican is a pastiche of Deep Purple In Rock by Deep Purple.
- Cpl. Kipper's Barnsley Trades Club Turn (2025) The 2020 album, recorded by the Mk.III Line-up was given an independent vinyl re-release via Elasticstage as part of a monthly 'Vinyl Re-issues Collectors Club'.
- The Tarn Machine (2025) The 2015 album, recorded by the Mk.III Line-up was given an independent vinyl re-release via Elasticstage as part of a monthly 'Vinyl Re-issues Collectors Club'.
- T'South 0 - Tarn 4 (2025) The 2016 album, recorded by the Mk.III Line-up was given an independent vinyl re-release via Elasticstage as part of a monthly 'Vinyl Re-issues Collectors Club'.
- Ave It : Bold As Brass (2025) The 2017 album, recorded by the Mk.III Line-up was given an independent vinyl re-release via Elasticstage as part of a monthly 'Vinyl Re-issues Collectors Club'.
- Place Of Spades (2025) The 2019 album, recorded by the Mk.III Line-up was given an independent vinyl re-release via Elasticstage as part of a monthly 'Vinyl Re-issues Collectors Club'.
- Rugh & Ryf (2025) The 2022 album, recorded by the Mk.III Line-up was given an independent vinyl re-release via Elasticstage as part of a monthly 'Vinyl Re-issues Collectors Club'.
- Evolver (2025) The album cover is a pastiche of Revolver by The Beatles.

== Other media ==
=== DVDs ===
- At Home With The Doonicans (2007)
- World Tour Of Tarn (2008)
- Back To The 80s: A Top Of The Pops Special (2009)
- The Bar-Steward Sons of Val Doonican’s Rock & Roll Circus (2011)
- Sat’day Neet Fever: Live At The Lamproom (2013)
- The Tarn Machine Live (2015)
- Live & Lairy At Fairport’s Cropredy Convention (2018) includes CD live album of the same show
- Live At The Palace Theatre (2019) includes CD double live album of the same show

=== Books ===
- Songs In The Key Of Tarn (A book of the band's lyrics and the stories behind them, written by Scott Doonican, with foreword from Eliza Carthy)

The book was later revised for a second edition.

- The Bar-Steward Sons of Val Doonican's Essential Listener's Guide To Cpl. Kipper's Barnsley Trades Club Turn (A book containing the lyrics of the songs from Cpl. Kipper's Barnsley Trades Club Turn, the stories behind them, and additional notes on the mixing and recording of the album, written by Scott Doonican, with foreword from Ringo Starr)
