= Victim You =

Studio album by Son of a Bitch
- Released: 1996
- Recorded: Revolution Studios, Manchester, UK, 1995
- Genre: Heavy metal
- Length: 49:15
- Label: Hengest

Victim You is the first studio album recorded by three of the original founding members of the British heavy metal band Saxon, Graham Oliver, Steve Dawson and Pete Gill, after their departure from Saxon. The album was recorded under Saxon's original UK club band name Son of a Bitch.

The songs were written by the band which also included guitarist Haydn Conway and Ted Bullet, former front man of the German band Thunderhead. The recordings were digitally captured at Revolution Studios in Manchester and later Mastered in Germany.

The tracks were released on SYME Music Publishing's own label Hengest Records, which licensed the recordings worldwide to various labels. In particular, on the JVC Records Japanese release, there featured one extra track which was not released anywhere else.

Graham Oliver and Steve Dawson lost the litigation for the use of the name Saxon and would later tour under the name of Oliver/Dawson Saxon.

== Track listing ==
1. "Bitch of a Place to Be" - 4:15
2. "Drivin' Sideways" - 5:31
3. "Past the Point" - 3:47
4. "No One's Gettin' Over" - 5:44
5. "Treacherous Times" - 4:44
6. "Love Your Misery" - 3:43
7. "I Still Care" - 5:42
8. "Old School" - 4:51
9. "More for Me" - 4:30
10. "Evil Sweet Evil" - 3:23
11. "Victim You" - 3:05
12. "Running Away (From You) (bonus)"

== Credits ==
- Ted Bullet - vocals
- Graham Oliver - guitars
- Haydn Conway - guitars
- Steve Dawson - bass guitar
- Pete Gill - drums
