= Graham Oliver =

English guitarist

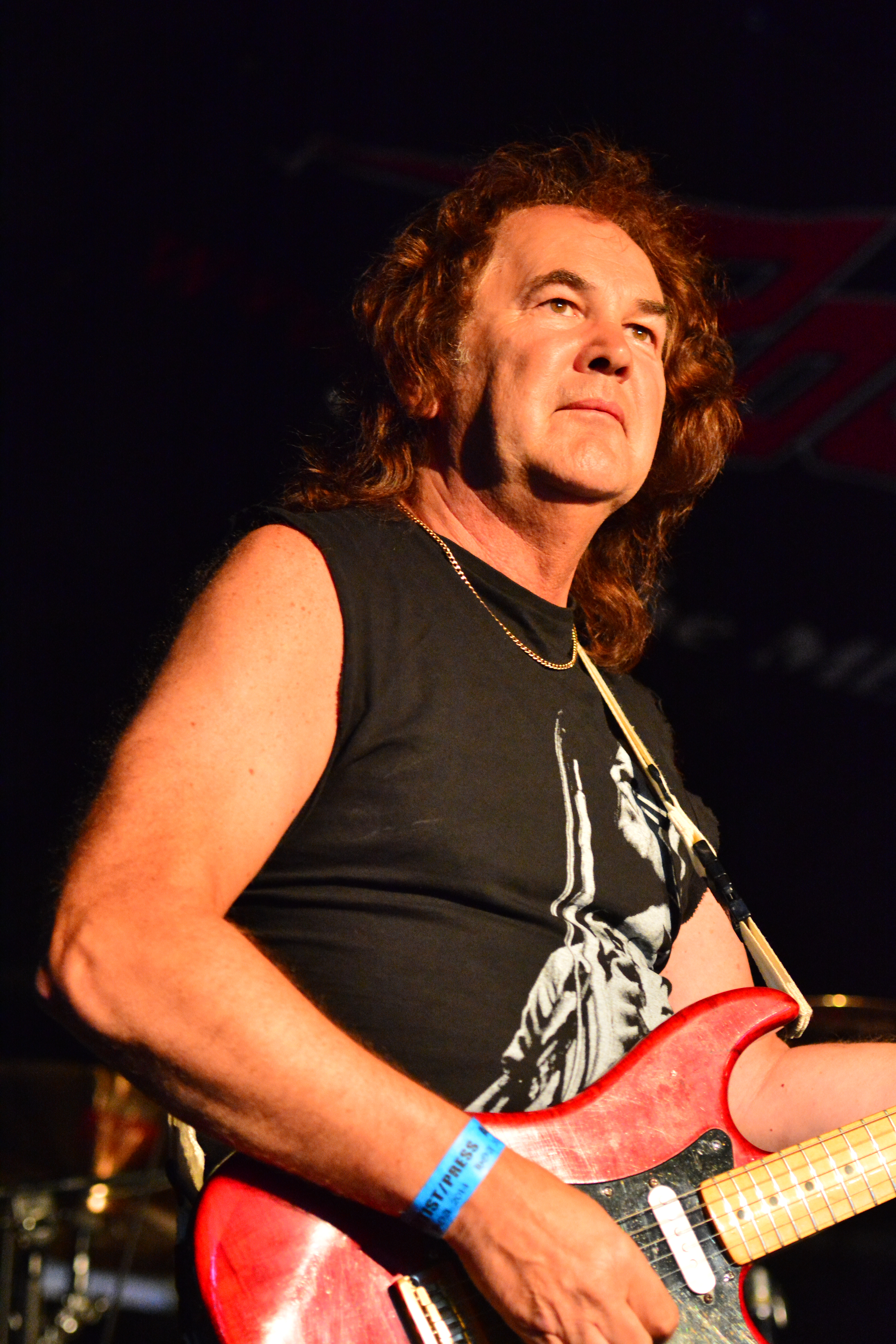

Background information
- Born: 6 July 1952 (age 73); Mexborough, South Yorkshire, England
- Genres: Heavy metal, hard rock
- Occupations: Guitarist
- Years active: 1970–present
- Label: Angel Air
- Member of: Mickey Finn's T-Rex
- Formerly of: Son of a Bitch; Saxon; Oliver/Dawson Saxon

Graham Oliver (born 6 July 1952) is an English guitarist who was born in Mexborough, South Yorkshire. He was a founding member in the heavy metal band Saxon from 1976 to 1996.

== Career ==
Oliver was a budding guitarist while working in a factory in the mid-1970s, but gave up after losing the tip of his index finger in an accident with a door, and sold his prized 1962/63 Fender Stratocaster (he would attempt to track down the guitar 40 years later). He was, however, encouraged by future bandmate Paul Quinn to learn to play again.

Oliver was originally a member of the band SOB, which formed in 1970. SOB played its first shows in 1970 under the name Blue Condition and toured extensively from 1970 to 1975, also in Germany and the Netherlands. The other members were future Saxon bassist Steve Dawson, Steve Firth on vocals and drummers David Bradley, John Hart, Cowley and John Walker.

The band merged in November 1975 with another local band (Coast) to become first Son of a Bitch and from 1978 Saxon, with whom Oliver played from the start and until 1995, as guitarist during a period in which the band had five top 20 albums in the UK.

After being fired from Saxon in 1996, he initially reformed his old band Son of a Bitch with former Saxon bassist Steve Dawson and drummer Pete Gill. Son of a Bitch released the album Victim You with Thunderhead singer Ted Bullet. Bullet and Gill left the band after the release of the album. They were replaced by the vocalist John Ward, and another former member of Saxon, Nigel Durham on drums.

In 1999, Oliver and Dawson trademarked the name 'Saxon', claiming they had exclusive rights to it, and attempted to stop Saxon singer Biff Byford from using the name. The trademark claim was overturned after it was ruled to be in bad faith, setting a legal precedent for ownership of a band name. Oliver and Dawson changed the name of the band to Oliver/Dawson Saxon, and undertook a British tour with Ronnie James Dio. Graham also duetted with Doug Aldrich on "Rainbow in the Dark" on the last gig at Plymouth.

Oliver has also released the solo album End of an Era in 2001. Five of the tracks were written and performed by the rock indie band Bullrush, with whom Graham Oliver's son Paul played drums, along Steve Tudberry and Scott Howitt. Also appearing on the album were Pete Gill, Steve Dawson, Kev Moore, Paul Johnson, Phil Hendriks, Richard Spencer and Chris Archer.

Since 2002, Oliver has played with former Marc Bolan session musician Paul Fenton, touring under the banner "Mickey Finn's T-Rex" and formerly "T. Rex (A Celebration of Marc and Mickey)". This opportunity materialised after Oliver played "Get It On" with Rolan Bolan at a show in Bradford.

Oliver suffered a stroke in January 2010, leaving him without feeling in one arm for several weeks.

In 2011, Oliver joined pupils at Mexborough School in their production of the Ben Elton musical We Will Rock You.

In 2012 guitar manufacturer "Vintage" collaborated with Graham to produce two signature guitars based on his famous Gibson SG and Flying-V guitars. The 'SG' model Vintage VS6GO and the 'V' model Vintage V60GO.

Oliver and Steve Dawson wrote the book Saxon Drugs and Rock and Roll - The Real Spinal Tap, published by Tomahawk Press in 2012, with a foreword by Harry Shearer (who drew inspiration for Spinal Tap from his time on tour with the band in 1982).

As of 2017, Oliver was still playing in Oliver/Dawson Saxon. Following Steve Dawson's decision to retire from performing in October 2021, Graham Oliver, Gav Coulson and Bri Shaughnessy recruited new bandmembers and chose to continue working together under the new name of 'Graham Oliver's Army'.

Oliver is also an authority on Yorkshire ceramics.

== Discography ==
=== Saxon ===
Studio albums

- (1979) Saxon
- (1980) Wheels of Steel
- (1980) Strong Arm of the Law
- (1981) Denim and Leather
- (1983) Power & the Glory
- (1984) Crusader
- (1985) Innocence Is No Excuse
- (1986) Rock the Nations
- (1988) Destiny
- (1990) Solid Ball of Rock
- (1992) Forever Free
- (1995) Dogs of War [Does not play on album]

Live albums

- (1982) The Eagle Has Landed
- (1989) Rock 'n' Roll Gypsies
- (1990) Greatest Hits Live!
- (1999) BBC Sessions
- (2000) Live at Buxted Lodge 1980

=== Son of a Bitch ===
- (1996) Victim You

=== Oliver/Dawson Saxon ===
- (2000) Re://Landed
- (2003) It's Alive
- (2003) The Second Wave: 25 Years of NWOBHM
- (2012) Motorbiker

=== Solo ===
- (2001) End of an Era

=== Collaborations and guest appearances ===
Oliver has made a handful of guest appearances with Barnsley comedy band The Bar-Steward Sons of Val Doonican

- (2010) Strong Arm Of The Law (with The Bar-Steward Sons of Val Doonican - on the album 'Cpl Kipper's Barnsley Trades Club Turn')
- (2013) Jump Ararnd (with The Bar-Steward Sons of Val Doonican, Eliza Carthy, Mike Harding, Maartin Allcock and Hugh Whitaker)
- (2013) Ace Of Spades (a folk-rock cover of Motörhead's 80's hit, with The Bar-Steward Sons of Val Doonican - on The Bar-Stewards' Big 7-Inch)
- (2014) The Devil Went Darn To Barnsley (with The Bar-Steward Sons of Val Doonican, Eliza Carthy, Mike Harding, and Maartin Allcock)
- (2017) Crosstarn Traffic (with The Bar-Steward Sons of Val Doonican - on the album 'Ave It: Bold As Brass)
- (2017) Wheels Of Steel (with The Bar-Steward Sons of Val Doonican - hidden track on the album 'Ave It: Bold As Brass)
- (2019) Place Of Spades (with The Bar-Steward Sons of Val Doonican - on the album of the same name.
