= Rock the Nations =

- Cover art by Paul R. Gregory

Studio album by Saxon
- Released: 15 September 1986
- Recorded: 1986
- Studio: Wisseloord (Hilversum)
- Genre: Heavy metal
- Length: 40:48
- Label: EMI
- Producer: Gary Lyons

Saxon chronology
Innocence Is No Excuse (1985)	Rock the Nations (1986)	Destiny (1988)

Singles from Rock the Nations
- 1. "Waiting for the Night" Released: 18 August 1986; 2. "Rock the Nations" Released: 27 October 1986; 3. "Northern Lady" Released: January 1987

Rock the Nations is the eighth studio album by English heavy metal band Saxon, released in September 1986.

== Album notes ==
The album is the first not to feature original bassist Steve Dawson, who was fired from the band earlier in 1986. For the recording of this album, vocalist Biff Byford, who had incidentally begun his career as a singer/bassist, recorded all the bass parts in Dawson's place. However, Paul Johnson joined the band as bassist before the album was released and is therefore credited in the liner notes.

== Reception ==
Professional ratings
Review scores
Source	Rating
AllMusic	2/5 stars
Classic Rock	5/10 stars
Collector's Guide to Heavy Metal	5/10
Kerrang!	3.5/5 stars

Rock the Nations received mixed reviews from critics. Eduardo Rivadavia of AllMusic gave the album two stars out of five and said in his review for the band's previous album Innocence Is No Excuse that "Saxon's internal chemistry was significantly unbalanced by the subsequent departure of key songwriter [Steve] Dawson -- a loss from which they would take years to fully recover." in his review for this album, he said that although the album was "graced with a somewhat rougher sound more in line with the band's New Wave of British Heavy Metal early years" it was still "arguably less heavy than its predecessor" and also criticised the songs "We Came Here to Rock", "Running Hot" and the title track for being "cliché-ridden" and "Waiting for the Night" and "Northern Lady" for being "unconvincingly sappy ballads", though he did regard "Party 'til You Puke" as being "good for a laugh" and also of interest for the guest appearance of Elton John. However, he concluded that the album is one that "the Saxon faithful would likely rather forget". Canadian journalist Martin Popoff found Rock The Nations "a little more full-bodied production-wise and less overtly metallic and by-the-book construction-wise" than Innocence Is No Excuse, "while still suffering for coasting on [Saxon]'s scant laurels".

== Track listing ==
All tracks are written by Biff Byford, Nigel Glockler, Graham Oliver and Paul Quinn, except where noted.

Side one
No.	Title	Writer(s)	Length
1.	"Rock the Nations"		4:40
2.	"Battle Cry"		5:26
3.	"Waiting for the Night"	Byford, Glockler	4:51
4.	"We Came Here to Rock"		4:18

Side two
No.	Title	Writer(s)	Length
5.	"You Ain't No Angel"		5:28
6.	"Running Hot"	Byford, Glockler, Oliver, Quinn, Steve Dawson	3:35
7.	"Party 'til You Puke"		3:25
8.	"Empty Promises"		4:09
9.	"Northern Lady"		4:42

2010 remaster bonus tracks
No.	Title	Writer(s)	Length
10.	"Chase the Fade [Instr.]" (b-side "Waiting for the Night")	Quinn, Oliver	2:32
11.	"Waiting for the Night" (7" single edit)	Byford, Glockler	4:12
12.	"Northern Lady" (7" single edit)		3:57
13.	"Everybody Up" (live. In Madrid, b-side "Northern Lady", 12", 45 RPM, Single producer: Simon Hanhart)		3:37
14.	"Dallas 1PM, 12", 45 RPM, Single, producer: Simon Hanhart" (live, b-side "Northern Lady")	Byford, Quinn, Oliver, Dawson, Pete Gill	6:34
15.	"Power and the Glory" (live)	Byford, Quinn, Oliver, Dawson, Glockler	6:52
16.	"Rock the Nations" (live)		4:49
17.	"Waiting for the Night" (live)	Byford, Glockler	4:34

- Bonus tracks 15–17 recorded live at Reading Festival, 23 August 1986.

== Personnel ==
- Biff Byford – lead vocals, bass guitar
- Graham Oliver – guitars
- Paul Quinn – guitars
- Paul Johnson – bass guitar (credited but does not play on the album)
- Nigel Glockler – drums

Production

- Gary Lyons – producer
- Wisseloord Studios, Hilversum, Netherlands – recording location
- Wisseloord Studios – mixing location
- Elton John – piano on tracks 7 and 9
- Paul R. Gregory – artwork

== Charts ==
Chart (1986)	Peak position
German Albums (Offizielle Top 100)	44
Swedish Albums (Sverigetopplistan)	26
UK Albums (Official Charts)	34
US Billboard 200	149

Chart (2018)	Peak position
UK Rock & Metal Albums (Official Charts)	31
