= Innocence Is No Excuse =

Studio album by Saxon
- Released: 2 September 1985
- Recorded: 1985
- Studio: Union (Munich)
- Genre: Heavy metal
- Length: 42:04
- Label: Parlophone/EMI
- Producer: Simon Hanhart

Saxon chronology
Crusader (1984)	Innocence Is No Excuse (1985)	Rock the Nations (1986)

Singles from Innocence Is No Excuse
- 1. "Back on the Streets" Released: 22 July 1985; 2. "Rockin' Again" Released: 30 September 1985; 3. "Rock 'n' Roll Gypsy" Released: 17 March 1986

Professional ratings
Review scores
Source	Rating
AllMusic	4/5 stars
Classic Rock	6/10 stars
Collector's Guide to Heavy Metal	4/10

Innocence Is No Excuse is the seventh studio album by English heavy metal band Saxon, released in September 1985. It was the band's first album for EMI after a falling-out with their previous label, Carrere Records, and their last with original bassist Steve Dawson.

== Release and reception ==
The song "Everybody Up" was used in the 1985 Italian horror film, Demoni.

The album was given a generally positive review by Eduardo Rivadavia of AllMusic, who awarded it four out of five stars. Although he commented in his review for the band's previous album Crusader that this album "would only lead to greater extremes of personality disorder and leave the group's fan base confused and utterly divided", he praised it for being "their strongest collective set of songs since 1981's Denim and Leather" although acknowledged that some of the songs "rubbed many fans the wrong way". He singled out the songs "Back on the Streets", "Rock 'n' Roll Gypsy" and "Broken Heroes" for praise, the latter of which he described as an "excellent ballad". He also pondered the question of what price the album had to the band's "street-level credibility" and said that "the answer will never be agreed upon". Jon Hotten in Classic Rock magazine wrote that the album was "not a huge misstep" and a "response to a glimmer of interest from the US", although "the glossy production lay at odds with Saxons's belt-and-braces take on heavy metal." Martin Popoff, author of The Collector's Guide to Heavy Metal, reviewed the album negatively which represents for Saxon the return "full-steam to the bastions of metal, without an idea in their dust-clouded heads", as shown in the clichéd titles and in the "old age ineptness on this rule-book headbanging fare."

== Track listing ==
Side one
No.	Title	Writer(s)	Length
1.	"Rockin' Again"	Biff Byford, Graham Oliver, Steve Dawson	5:12
2.	"Call of the Wild"	Byford, Paul Quinn, Oliver, Dawson, Nigel Glockler	4:03
3.	"Back on the Streets"	Byford, Quinn, Oliver, Dawson, Glockler	3:59
4.	"Devil Rides Out"	Byford, Dawson	4:23
5.	"Rock 'n' Roll Gypsy"	Byford, Dawson	4:13

Side two
No.	Title	Writer(s)	Length
6.	"Broken Heroes"	Byford, Dawson	5:27
7.	"Gonna Shout"	Byford, Quinn, Oliver, Dawson, Glockler	3:58
8.	"Everybody Up"	Byford, Dawson	3:28
9.	"Raise Some Hell"	Byford, Dawson	3:40
10.	"Give It Everything You've Got"	Byford, Quinn, Oliver, Dawson, Glockler	3:27

2010 remaster bonus tracks
No.	Title	Writer(s)	Length
11.	"Back on the Streets" (12" Club Mix)	Byford, Quinn, Oliver, Dawson, Glockler	5:10
12.	"Live Fast Die Young" (b-side "Back on the Streets")	Glockler, Dawson, Byford	3:48
13.	"Krakatoa" (b-side "Rock 'n' Roll Gypsy")	Byford, Quinn, Oliver, Dawson, Glockler	3:46
14.	"The Medley *" (live, b-side "Rock 'n' Roll Gypsy")	Various	9:05
15.	"Gonna Shout" (live)	Byford, Quinn, Oliver, Dawson, Glockler	4:30
16.	"Devil Rides Out" (live)	Byford, Dawson	4:59
17.	"Back on the Streets" (BBC in Concert, Hammersmith 1985)	Byford, Quinn, Oliver, Dawson, Glockler	4:38

Notes

- "The Medley" consists of "Heavy Metal Thunder", "Stand Up and Be Counted", "Taking Your Chances" and "Warrior."

2022 Reissue, Remastered, Digipak Bonus Tracks
No.	Title	Writer(s)	Length
11.	"Live Fast Die Young"	Byford, Glocker, Dawson	3:48
12.	"Krakatoa"	Saxon	3:46
13.	"Broken Heroes"	Byford, Glocker, Dawson	5:16
14.	"Devil Rides Out"	Byford, Dawson	4:47
15.	"Rock 'n' Roll Gipsy"	Byford, Dawson	4:48
16.	"Rockin' Again"	Byford, Glocker, Dawson	5:36
17.	"Shout It Out"	Byford, Oliver, Glockler, Dawson	5:38

Notes

- Tracks 13–17: Chapel Studio, Thoresby Demos

== Personnel ==
Saxon

- Biff Byford – lead vocals
- Graham Oliver – guitars
- Paul Quinn – guitars
- Steve Dawson – bass guitar
- Nigel Glockler – drums

Production

- Produced and Recorded by Simon Hanhart; additional recording by Keith Nixon
- Recorded at Union Studios, Munich, Germany
- Mixed by Saxon and Simon Hanhart at Wisseloord Studios, Hilversum

== Charts ==
Chart (1985)	Peak position
Finnish Albums (The Official Finnish Charts)	15
German Albums (Offizielle Top 100)	33
Swedish Albums (Sverigetopplistan)	18
UK Albums (Official Charts)	36
US Billboard 200	133
