= The Eagle Has Landed (album) =

Live album by Saxon
- Released: 10 May 1982
- Recorded: 1981–1982
- Genre: Heavy metal
- Length: 44:55
- Label: Carrere
- Producer: Saxon

Saxon chronology
Denim and Leather (1981)	The Eagle Has Landed (1982)	Power & the Glory (1983)

Professional ratings
Review scores
Source	Rating
AllMusic	3.5/5 stars
Collector's Guide to Heavy Metal	6/10

The Eagle Has Landed is the first live album by heavy metal band Saxon and the first album featuring their long time drummer Nigel Glockler. It was recorded during the European leg of the world tour supporting the album Denim and Leather and released in 1982. The album reached #5 in the UK charts.

It won the British Heavy Metal live 1982 Award.

== Track listing ==
All tracks are written by Biff Byford, Paul Quinn, Graham Oliver, Steve Dawson and Pete Gill.

Side one
No.	Title	Length
1.	"Motorcycle Man"	4:22
2.	"747 (Strangers in the Night)"	4:38
3.	"Princess of the Night"	4:20
4.	"Strong Arm of the Law"	4:39
5.	"Heavy Metal Thunder"	4:09

Side two
No.	Title	Length
6.	"20,000 Ft."	3:26
7.	"Wheels of Steel"	8:52
8.	"Never Surrender"	3:54
9.	"Fire in the Sky"	2:41
10.	"Machine Gun"	3:52

2006 remaster bonus tracks
No.	Title	Length
11.	"And the Bands Played On"	3:05
12.	"See the Light Shining"	5:25
13.	"Frozen Rainbow"	6:03
14.	"Midnight Rider"	5:21
15.	"Dallas 1PM"	6:14
16.	"Hungry Years"	5:52

- Bonus tracks recorded live at Hammersmith Odeon, 1981–1982.

== Personnel ==
- Biff Byford – lead vocals
- Graham Oliver – guitars
- Paul Quinn – guitars
- Steve Dawson – bass guitar
- Nigel Glockler – drums

Production

- Saxon – producer
- Andy Lydon – engineer
- Steward Eales – engineer
- UK and Europe – recording locations
- The Mobile – recording equipment
- Manor and Bray Sound Studio – mixing location

== Charts ==
Chart (1982)	Peak position
Dutch Albums (Album Top 100)	32
German Albums (Offizielle Top 100)	33
Swedish Albums (Sverigetopplistan)	30
UK Albums (Official Charts)	5

== Certifications ==
Region	Certification	Certified units/sales
United Kingdom (BPI)	Silver	60,000^{^}
^{^} Shipments figures based on certification alone.
