= Crusader (Saxon album) =

- Cover art by Paul R. Gregory

Studio album by Saxon
- Released: 30 January 1984
- Recorded: 1983
- Studio: Sound City (Van Nuys)
- Genre: Heavy metal
- Length: 39:10
- Label: Carrere
- Producer: Kevin Beamish

Saxon chronology
Power & the Glory (1983)	Crusader (1984)	Innocence Is No Excuse (1985)

Singles from Crusader
- 1. "Sailing to America" Released: January 1984; 2. "Do It All for You" Released: 9 April 1984

Crusader is the sixth studio album by English heavy metal band Saxon, released on 30 January 1984 by Carrere Records.

== Songs ==
Of the title of the album and the title track, bassist Steve Dawson has said that "In England, there's a paper called the Daily Express, and on the logo at the top of the paper, there's a crusader, and there was a car made by Ford called a Cortina Crusader. That's what started it off. We just liked the name "Crusader". We didn't have any connotations of what it meant as far as history goes, but we just liked the name "Crusader", so we just wrote the lyrics to fit the title, really."

== Reception ==
Professional ratings
Review scores
Source	Rating
AllMusic	3.5/5 stars
Collector's Guide to Heavy Metal	6/10

Eduardo Rivadavia of AllMusic said that although by the time they released the album, "the band had obviously stopped leading the New Wave of British Heavy Metal with its aggressive, blue-collar biker anthems", the album "as a whole offers a slight improvement over the previous year's Power & the Glory from an overall songwriting perspective". Canadian journalist Martin Popoff considered Saxon's turn to "a low-cal, kinder, gentler metal... a well-conceived experiment" and denied those who called Crusader "a failure" and "a bald-faced commercial maneuver", finding the album "refreshing if more than occasionally flawed."

The album reached No. 1 in the metal charts in Sweden, France and Germany. It peaked at #18 in the UK Albums Chart. It also charted in the U.S. Billboard chart.

== Track listing ==
All tracks are written by Saxon, except where noted.

Side one
No.	Title	Writer(s)	Length
1.	"The Crusader Prelude"		1:05
2.	"Crusader"		6:33
3.	"A Little Bit of What You Fancy"		3:50
4.	"Sailing to America"		5:03
5.	"Set Me Free" (Sweet cover)	Andy Scott	3:13

Side two
No.	Title	Writer(s)	Length
6.	"Just Let Me Rock"		4:11
7.	"Bad Boys (Like to Rock N' Roll)"		3:24
8.	"Do It All for You"	Biff Byford, Paul Quinn, Graham Oliver, Steve Dawson, Kevin Beamish	4:42
9.	"Rock City"	Byford, Quinn, Oliver, Dawson	3:16
10.	"Run for Your Lives"		3:53

2009 remaster bonus tracks
No.	Title	Writer(s)	Length
11.	"Borderline" (Kaley Studio demo 1983)		2:42
12.	"Helter Skelter" (Kaley Studio demo 1983)		3:35
13.	"Crusader" (Kaley Studio demo 1983)		6:21
14.	"Do It All for You" (Kaley Studio demo 1983)	Byford, Quinn, Oliver, Dawson, Beamish	4:46
15.	"A Little Bit of What You Fancy" (Kaley Studio demo 1983)		3:10
16.	"Sailing to America" (Kaley Studio demo 1983)		5:11
17.	"Set Me Free" (Kaley Studio demo 1983)	Scott	3:22
18.	"Just Let Me Rock" (Kaley Studio demo 1983)		4:01
19.	"Do It All for You (intro)/Run for Your Lives" (Kaley Studio demo 1983)	Byford, Quinn, Oliver, Dawson, Beamish	4:59

== Personnel ==
- Biff Byford – lead vocals
- Graham Oliver – guitars
- Paul Quinn – guitars
- Steve Dawson – bass guitar
- Nigel Glockler – drums

Production

- Kevin Beamish – producer, engineer
- Bruce Barris – engineer
- Sound City Studios, Los Angeles, California – recording location
- George Marino – mastering at Sterling Sound, New York City
- Paul R. Gregory – artwork

== Charts ==
Chart (1984)	Peak position
Dutch Albums (Album Top 100)	16
German Albums (Offizielle Top 100)	20
Swedish Albums (Sverigetopplistan)	15
Swiss Albums (Schweizer Hitparade)	26
UK Albums (Official Charts)	18
US Billboard 200	174
