= Power & the Glory =

Studio album by Saxon
- Released: March 1983
- Recorded: 1982
- Studio: Axis Sound (Atlanta)
- Genre: Heavy metal
- Length: 36:37
- Label: Carrere
- Producer: Jeff Glixman

Saxon chronology
The Eagle Has Landed (1982)	Power & the Glory (1983)	Crusader (1984)

Singles from Power & the Glory
- 1. "Power and the Glory" Released: April 1983; 2. "Nightmare" Released: July 1983

Power & the Glory is the fifth studio album by English heavy metal band Saxon, released in March 1983 by Carrere Records. This is the first Saxon studio album with new drummer Nigel Glockler and was recorded in Atlanta, Georgia in the fall of 1982.

== Critical reception ==
Professional ratings
Review scores
Source	Rating
AllMusic	3/5 stars
Collector's Guide to Heavy Metal	10/10

The album peaked at #15 in the UK Albums Chart. It reached No. 1 in the Metal charts in Sweden, Norway, France and Germany selling over 1.5 million copies worldwide. It was their first album to enter the Billboard 200 in the US, peaking at #155.

A retrospective AllMusic review by Eduardo Rivadavia gave the album three out of five stars. Rivadavia criticised the mixing, saying that the album "sounds as though it was recorded in a tin can, albeit a very, very large tin can" eliminating the "big, in-your-face, and gritty" sound heard on the band's past albums. He also criticised the material itself, saying that "despite a few sparks generated by "Redline," "Warrior," and the proto-thrashing "This Town Rocks," only the anthemic title track ultimately showed enough staying power (and glory) to earn a frequent slot in Saxon's live repertoire". Canadian journalist Martin Popoff writes quite the opposite and considers Power & the Glory Saxon's best album, praising the production and the contribution of "new ass-kicking drummer Nigel Glockler" to "working a metal magic that is the embodiment of the NWOBHM's ideals now made real."

The version released in the USA contained a rerecorded version of “Suzi Hold On” instead of “Midas Touch”.

In 2005, Power & the Glory was ranked number 376 in Rock Hard magazine's book The 500 Greatest Rock & Metal Albums of All Time.

== Track listing ==
All tracks are written by Biff Byford, Paul Quinn, Graham Oliver, Steve Dawson and Nigel Glockler.

Side one
No.	Title	Length
1.	"Power and the Glory"	5:57
2.	"Redline"	3:38
3.	"Warrior"	3:47
4.	"Nightmare"	4:25

Side two
No.	Title	Length
5.	"This Town Rocks"	3:58
6.	"Watching the Sky"	3:43
7.	"Midas Touch"	4:13
8.	"The Eagle Has Landed"	6:56

2009 remaster bonus tracks
No.	Title	Length
9.	"Denim & Leather" (live, b-side "Power and the Glory")	5:11
10.	"Suzie Hold On" (Jeff Glixman version '82)	5:01
11.	"Turn out the Lights" (Kaley Studio demo 1982)	3:57
12.	"Stand Up and Rock" (Kaley Studio demo 1982)	3:36
13.	"Power and the Glory" (Kaley Studio demo 1982)	6:17
14.	"Saturday Night" (Kaley Studio demo 1982)	4:11
15.	"Midas Touch" (Kaley Studio demo 1982)	4:07
16.	"Nightmare" (Kaley Studio demo 1982)	5:55
17.	"Redline" (Kaley Studio demo 1982)	3:37

== Song information ==
=== Power and the Glory ===
"Power and the Glory" was released as a single in April 1983. It reached number 32 on the UK Singles Chart.

The song is an early power metal song with a fast tempo and lyrics relating to war and battles. A music video for the song was shot at Bodiam Castle in East Sussex, England. It shows the band members, dressed in colored jumpsuits and wielding spear weapons, running through the castle grounds. They are shown leaping through windows and over charred mannequins, mixed with footage of the band performing a live stage concert. Each band member then enters a strange box in the castle wall which transforms them into their stage attire, and they then encounter a fire-breathing wizard before finally performing with their instruments inside the castle entrance.

== Personnel ==
- Biff Byford – lead vocals
- Graham Oliver – guitars
- Paul Quinn – guitars
- Steve Dawson – bass guitar
- Nigel Glockler – drums

Production

- Jeff Glixman – producer
- Jeff Glixman – engineer
- Cheryl Bordagary – engineer
- Les Horn – engineer
- Axis Sound Studio, Atlanta – recording and mixing location
- Nic Tompkin – cover design, photography
- Chris Peyton – design (reissue)
- Gavin Wright – design (reissue)

== Charts ==
Chart (1983)	Peak position
Dutch Albums (Album Top 100)	26
German Albums (Offizielle Top 100)	28
Swedish Albums (Sverigetopplistan)	9
UK Albums (Official Charts)	15
US Billboard 200	155

== See also ==
- List of anti-war songs
