= Denim and Leather =

Studio album by Saxon
- Released: 25 September 1981
- Recorded: 1981
- Studios: Aquarius Studios, Geneva, Switzerland; Polar Studios, Stockholm, Sweden
- Genre: Heavy metal
- Length: 37:56
- Label: Carrere
- Producers: Nigel Thomas, Saxon (tracks 2 and 6)

Saxon chronology
Strong Arm of the Law (1980)	Denim and Leather (1981)	The Eagle Has Landed (1982)

Singles from Denim and Leather
- 1. "And the Bands Played On" Released: 27 March 1981; 2. "Never Surrender" Released: 10 July 1981; 3. "Princess of the Night" Released: 23 October 1981

Denim and Leather is the fourth studio album by English heavy metal band Saxon released in 1981. The album was certified Gold status in the U.K. This was the last album with the classic line up of Saxon, as drummer Pete Gill would leave the band due to a hand injury, later joining Motörhead; this was also seen as the last of their trilogy of classic albums (the previous two being Wheels of Steel and Strong Arm of the Law).

== Song notes ==
The album spawned two of their most successful singles, "And the Bands Played On" and "Princess of the Night". There are nine songs on this album, which are noted for lyrics about a wide range of topics. "Princess of the Night" is a song about a powerful steam locomotive and "And the Bands Played On" is about 1980 Monsters of Rock Festival – name checking Rainbow. Other themes for the songs include: partying, the spirit of the music, fighting, and, like many of their songs, motorcycles. "Midnight Rider" is a song about Saxon's 1980 North American tour.

The name of the album and song was inspired by the popular attire of metalheads in the early 1980s, defined by either denim jeans and jackets or a leather biker jacket (often worn with a denim cut-off waistcoat). The song is seen as a tribute from the band to their fans while describing the history of the sub-culture and the rise of the new wave of British heavy metal (NWOBHM).

== Reception ==
Professional ratings
Review scores
Source	Rating
AllMusic	4.5/5 stars
Collector's Guide to Heavy Metal	7/10
Record Mirror	5/5 stars
Smash Hits	4/10

The album peaked at #9 in the UK Albums Chart.

The album is regarded as a classic in the band's discography, and has been received positively by critics and fans. Eduardo Rivadavia of AllMusic called the opening track "Princess of the Night" an "infectiously anthemic opening statement", whilst praising the title track for also being an "unqualified classic". He considered "Out of Control" and "Rough and Ready" to be strong tracks, whilst regarding "Fire in the Sky", "Midnight Rider", and "And The Bands Played On" as "spectacular". Canadian journalist Martin Popoff had mixed feelings about Denim and Leather, which he considered "Saxon's stadium rock album... boppier and sillier than Wheels of Steel, but still catchy", denouncing "the band's progressively feeble song skills while gaining points for conviction."

== Track listing ==
All tracks are written by Saxon.

Side one
No.	Title	Length
1.	"Princess of the Night"	4:01
2.	"Never Surrender"	3:15
3.	"Out of Control"	4:07
4.	"Rough and Ready"	4:51
5.	"Play It Loud"	4:11

Side two
No.	Title	Length
6.	"And the Bands Played On"	2:48
7.	"Midnight Rider"	5:45
8.	"Fire in the Sky"	3:37
9.	"Denim and Leather"	5:25

2009 remaster bonus tracks
No.	Title	Length
10.	"20,000 Ft." (remix; b-side Never Surrender)	4:07
11.	"Bap Shoo Ap" (live at Castle Donington 1980; b-side Never Surrender)	6:41
12.	"Intro/And the Bands Played On" (live)	4:34
13.	"Princess of the Night" (live at the Rainbow Theatre London, 16th Dec 1981)	4:17
14.	"Midnight Rider" (live at Hammersmith 25th Oct 1981)	5:40
15.	"Never Surrender" (live at Hammersmith 25th Oct 1981)	3:58
16.	"Fire in the Sky" (live at Hammersmith 25th Oct 1981)	2:41
17.	"Machine Gun" (live at Hammersmith 25th Oct 1981)	2:44
18.	"Play It Loud" (live at Wolverhampton 17th Dec 1981)	5:25

- Bonus tracks 12–18 recorded live on the Denim and Leather Tour, 1981.

== Personnel ==
- Biff Byford – lead vocals
- Paul Quinn – guitars
- Graham Oliver – guitars
- Steve Dawson – bass guitar
- Pete Gill – drums
- Gordon Bryan – backing vocals on "Denim and Leather"

Production

- Nigel Thomas – production
- Andy Lyden – engineering
- Aquarius Studios, Geneva – recording location
- Polar Studios, Stockholm – additional recording location, mixing location
- Blechner Poxon – manager

== Charts ==
Chart (1981-82)	Peak position
Dutch Albums (Album Top 100)	39
French Albums (SNEP)	19
German Albums (Offizielle Top 100)	37
Swedish Albums (Sverigetopplistan)	21
UK Albums (Official Charts)	9

Chart (2018)	Peak position
UK Rock & Metal Albums (Official Charts)	36

Chart (2021)	Peak position
Scottish Albums (Official Charts)	85

== Sales and certifications ==
Region	Certification	Certified units/sales
United Kingdom (BPI)	Silver	60,000^{^}
Yugoslavia	—	9,451
^{^} Shipments figures based on certification alone.
