= Paine Proffitt =

American-born artist living in England (born 1972)

Paine Proffitt (born 1972 in Phoenix, Arizona) is an American-born artist living in England, best known for his sporting works and for his depiction of the "working man's life". Proffitt moved to Philadelphia when he was fourteen after spending his early years in Saigon, Beirut and Kenya as a result of the work of his father - novelist and war correspondent Nicholas Proffitt. Proffitt studied illustration at the University of Brighton in 1994 before moving to England permanently in 2001.

Proffitt cites some of his influences as being Chagall and Picasso and while not ascribing himself to any one art movement in particular, feels that surrealism, cubism and contemporary naïve art are the best labels for his work. The influence of Fred Otnes has also been noted, with this being most apparent in the collage work Proffitt produced under the pseudonym of Nicholas Hudson Paine. Similarities to L. S. Lowry have also been recognised due to the northern working-class themes of some of his works.

Sport, and especially football, has been a major inspiration to Proffitt's artwork: 'Football is central to who we are and where we come from'. This sporting theme has seen exhibitions such as that at Twickenham for the Rugby World Cup in 2007 as well as commissions for football programme artwork. West Bromwich Albion used Proffitt's work for their programme covers throughout the 2011-12 season, this culminating in the July 2012 exhibition at The Public. Proffitt's artwork featured on the 2012-13 programmes of Port Vale and Aberdeen FC although Proffitt's association with Port Vale goes back several seasons before this.

Stoke-born popstar Robbie Williams is purported to own several of Proffitt's pieces, as do cyclists Bradley Wiggins and Mark Cavendish after the city council presented them with two commissioned paintings during the Stoke-on-Trent stage of the Tour of Britain in September 2012. In July 2020, Proffitt created artwork depicting the song Alan & The Robot by the comedy band The Bar-Steward Sons of Val Doonican for Scott Doonican, the band's frontman. Later in the year he went on to paint the pub sign for Doonican's pub 'The Pint & Puppet'. An early Proffitt piece took top lot in a 2011 UK auction alongside work by Govinder Nazran, Sir Sidney Robert Nolan and Reggie Kray. In a departure from his football-related work, Proffitt most recently exhibited a series of gothic fairy-tale inspired paintings in an exhibition entitled Broken Sleep.
