= Bearded Theory =

UK music festival

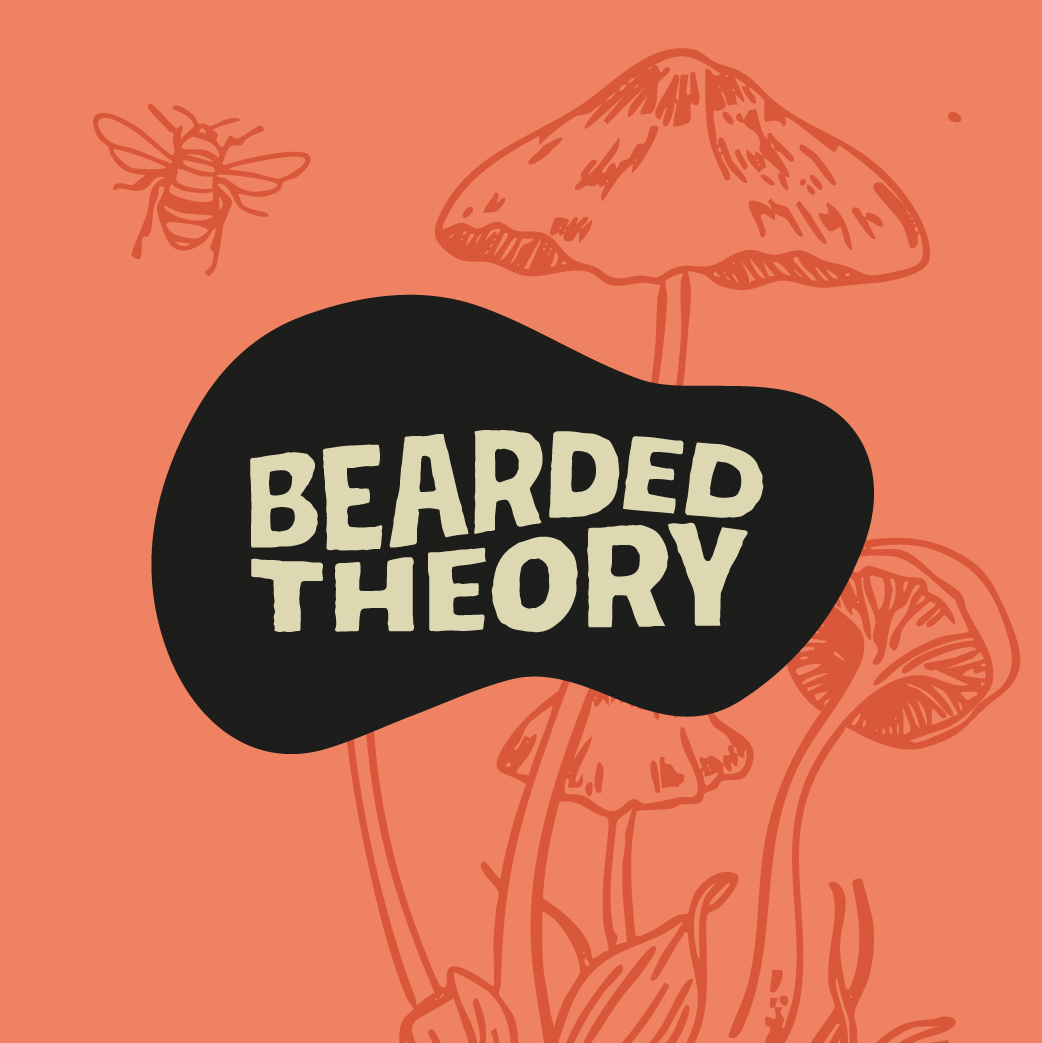
- Bearded Theory Festival logo for 2026 edition
- Genre: Independent music
- Dates: late May
- Locations: Catton Hall, Walton-on-Trent, Derbyshire, England, UK
- Years active: 2008–present
- Website: www.beardedtheory.co.uk

Bearded Theory is an independent music festival which has no sponsorship or branding that takes place every May on the South Derbyshire, West Midland and Staffordshire border in the National Forest in Britain. The festival is organised by DHP Family and was first held in 2008. The festival has nine stages which are:

- The Pallet - the main stage
- The Meadow - introduced in 2023 as a secondary large stage
- The Woodland - a small stage in the woods
- Coda - dance music; Coda was introduced in 2024 replacing Magical Sounds
- The Maui Waui Stage
- Big Ed - DJ and dance music; Big Ed replaced The Ship in 2023
- Convoy Cabaret
- Something Else Tea Tent, which has operated at Bearded Theory since its inaugural festival in 2008 and is the only remaining vendor from the original event. Alongside a small stage hosting musicians and poets, it provides a quieter community space used by neurodivergent festivalgoers and members of the LGBTQ+ community.
- The Knockerdown Variety Club - home to Speakers' Corner

Additionally, the festival also hosts an award-winning Children's Village, including the first-of-its-kind Festival School, - as well as EARTH; an area of crafting, wellness and healing, several public real ale bars, several cocktail or gin bars, and a funfair. The festival has several campsites and campervan fields, multiple arena areas and is spread over 250 acres at Catton Park.

== History ==
Bearded Theory began life at the Knockerdown Public House, near Carsington Water in 2008. Held over two nights and it overloaded the capacity of the venue. Opening with two acoustic acts (one of whom was also the festival compere known as 'Freedom') the first full band to play the festival were Nottingham rock band Felicity Kicks. Other bands to play included 3 Daft Monkeys, Dreadzone, Tarantism & Hobo Jones & the Junkyard Dogs.

In 2009, the festival was held at 30-acre Bradley Nook Farm in Hulland Ward. The new look festival hosted 4 stages; the Main Stage, Campfire Stage (the stage structure was used in 2015 as the Woodland Stage), the introduction of the Magical Sounds, a large dance big top and remains a key part of the festival and a reggae sound system. During the festival, freak weather which was subsequently described as a tornado tore through the festival site, uprooting stalls, tents, and the Main stage and also did damage to the second stage. The organisers continued the festival and an alternative stage was erected in the bar and the festival continued, with music from Goldblade, The Saw Doctors and Tarantism, and others.

The 2010 festival was substantially larger, selling out and filling the 30 acres available, and by 2011, a new site had to be found. The organisers arranged with the National Trust for the festival to be held at Kedleston Park within Kedleston Hall in Derby, an 80-acre parkland. In 2011 Bearded Theory won UK's Best Independent Festival at the AIM Music Awards.

By 2012 the crowd of festival goers had grown, by now over 600 acts had played at the festival, including King Blues, The Wonder Stuff, New Model Army, The Waterboys, Athlete, The Orb, Wheatus, Adam Ant and the Damned. During 2012 the organizers spent time delivering stage safety seminars to European events industry at Primavera Sound in Barcelona and various industry conferences in London following the successful implementation of a comprehensive stage safety policy at the festival.

The 2013 line-up included, with The Levellers, Reverend & Makers, Asian Dub Foundation, New Model Army, A Guy Called Gerald, The Farm, Maroon Town, The Destroyers, The Jive Aces and Gallon Drunk across six stages. There was also an "Unsigned Bands Contest". Bearded Theory won Best Small Festival at the UK Festival Awards.

In 2014, the festival had to move once again after citing "increasing bureaucracy imposed by the landowners". The festival decided to locate to the independently owned 250-acre estate Catton Park in South Derbyshire, a venue the organizers had looked at before deciding to locate to Kedleston Hall. Bearded Theory attracted a capacity crowd. Performing bands included Carter USM, UB40, Stranglers, Peter Hook, Wonderstuff, Pop Will Eat Itself, Reverend & the Makers. The festival's organizers won the Promoter of the Year award at the UK Festival Awards for their industry work with stage safety. In 2015 the festival agreed to a 5-year contract to remain at Catton Hall and implemented substantial land improvements including access roads, installing a permanent water supply and drainage.

Bands that appeared included The Mission, James, Afro Celt Sound System, Lab 4, Cara Dillon, Neville Staple, Alabama 3, Gun, Hugh Cornwell, British Sea Power, Buzzcocks, Misty in Roots and The Bar-Steward Sons of Val Doonican. The festival sold out and operated an onsite school on the Friday of the festival. The school met key learning criteria at each age level and classes included Science, Home Economics, Math's, English, History and lots more. The P.E classes were operated by Derby County FC. The school assisted parents taking children out of school without being fined and was a festival first.

In 2016 the festival sold out and went onto win Best Family Festival at the UK Festival Awards and gig of the year for the performance by Wilko Johnson in Stand Out Magazine. Bands who performed included Killing Joke, Squeeze, Jack Savoretti, Levellers, The Jam, Black Uhuru and Stiff Little Fingers.

2017 featured over 150 bands and DJ's with Madness, Skunk Anansie, The Fall, Seasick Steve, Vintage Trouble, CJ Bolland, Foy Vance, Sugarhill Gang. The festival sold out a month in advance and received various good reviews from Festivals for All, BBC 6 Music, Radio 2, efestivals, Gourmet Gigs, Louder than War Magazine, The Guardian, The Independent and Festival Kidz.

The 2018 festival featured Led Zeppelin frontman Robert Plant as headliner and sold out faster than any event since the first edition. Elsewhere on the line-up were Jimmy Cliff, Blossoms, IDLES, Sleaford Mods, Jake Bugg, and many more.

2019 saw infrastructure improvements to make arrivals easier and performances from Sister Bliss of Faithless, Oh Sees, Editors, Suede, Reef, The Sherlocks, The Cult, and loads more.

On 20 March 2020, it was announced that due to the COVID-19 pandemic, the 2020 Spring Festival would be postponed to 10–13 September.

In 2022, Bearded Theory Festival returned to Catton Hall for its first event post-Covid. The festival sold out in advance and featured Patti Smith, The Flaming Lips, and Placebo as headliners.

2023 saw the introduction of Big Ed, a new DJ stage that was custom designed and built for Bearded Theory resembling a giant bearded forest head, adorned with foliage and mushrooms. This was the first event programmed by DHP Family and featured Panic Shack, Yard Act, Pigs Pigs Pigs Pigs Pigs Pigs Pigs, Warmduscher as well as headline performances from Interpol, Gogol Bordello, and Primal Scream on the Pallet Stage, plus Echo and the Bunnymen, Public Service Broadcasting, and Viagra Boys in the other brand new Meadow Stage, introduced to add more musical artists to the line-up and provide a bigger second stage than the Woodland area.

In 2024, a Wednesday Early Entry ticket was introduced to give customers the chance to arrive earlier. The Festival was headlined by Jane's Addiction, Future Islands, and the first festival headline show for Amyl and the Sniffers. The bill also featured English Teacher, Sprints, Sleaford Mods, Dinosaur Jr., and a big focus on electronic music with the introduction of the new CODA stage featuring DJ sets from Orbital, Bez of Happy Mondays, Utah Saints, and Leeroy Thornhill of The Prodigy.

2025 had Iggy Pop headlining alongside Paul Heaton featuring special guest singer Rianne Downey and Manic Street Preachers. The line-up also included The Mary Wallopers, Ezra Furman, LTJ Bukem, Antony Szmierek, Nadine Shah, The Bar-Steward Sons of Val Doonican, Mannequin Pussy, as well as the introduction of Speakers' Corner in the new Knockerdown Variety Club tent, featuring the likes of Yard Act, Stewart Lee and The Lovely Eggs in conversation.

Bearded Theory has won 8 awards, most recently the Best Line-Up award for 2024. The event has also won 2016 UK's Best Family Festival, 2014 Promoter of the Year at the UK Festival Awards and Silver Award Festival Kidz Awards, 2013 UK's Best Small Festival at the UK Festival Awards and Gold Award at the Festival Kidz Awards. In 2011 the festival won Best Independent Festival at the AIM Independent Music Awards.
