= Steve Dawson =

English bassist

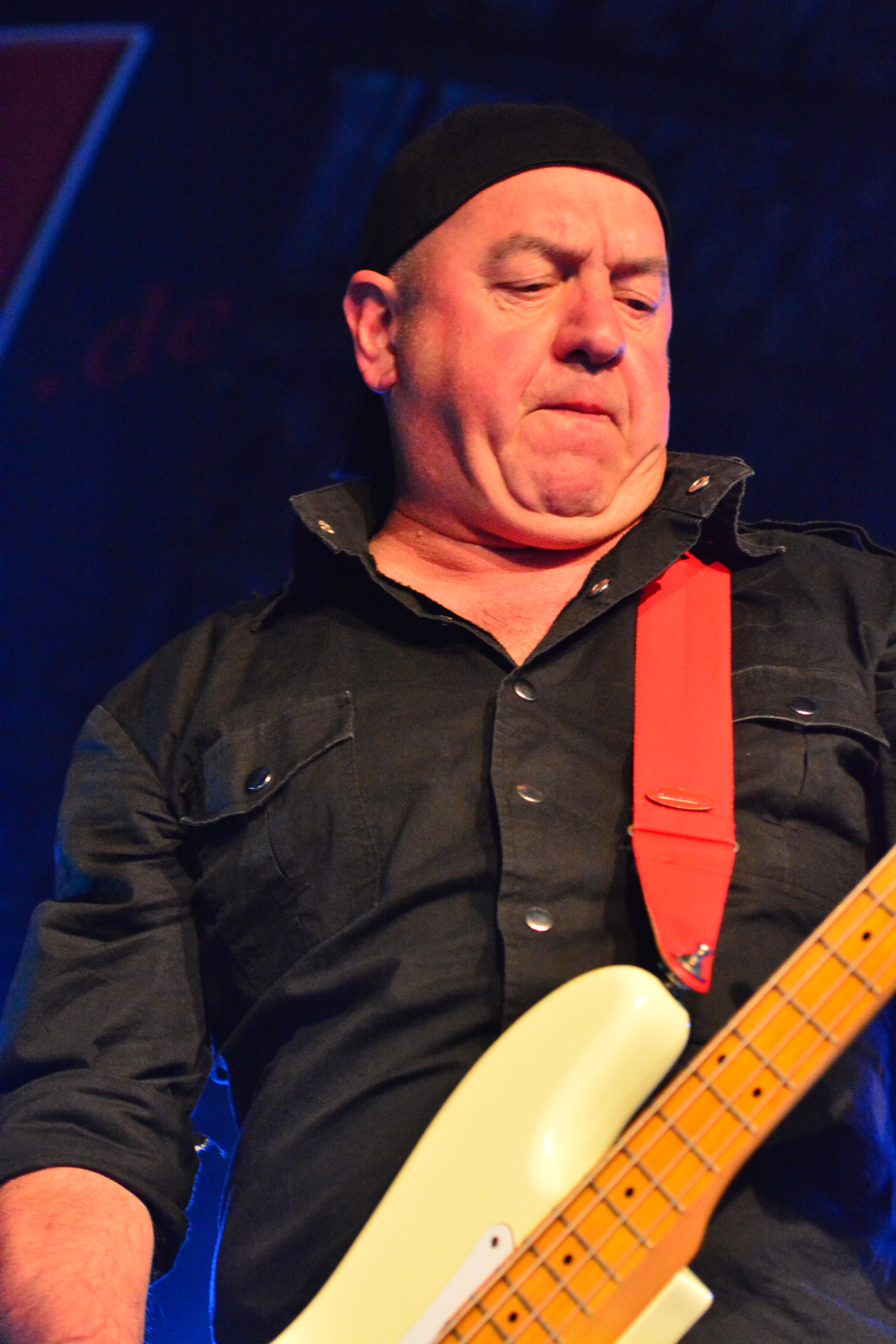
- Dawson in 2014

Background information
- Born: Steven Dawson; 24 February 1952 (age 74); Sheffield, Yorkshire, England
- Genres: Heavy metal; hard rock; blues rock
- Occupations: Bassist
- Years active: 1976–2021
- Label: Carrere

Steven "Dobby" Dawson (born 24 February 1952) is an English bass guitarist, convicted sex offender, and a founder of the heavy metal band Saxon.

Dawson started out in 1970 in the band Blue Condition, which became SOB after a few shows only, together with Dave Bradley, Steve Firth and future Saxon guitarist Graham Oliver. In 1975 Dawson, Oliver and new drummer John Walker joined forces with Coast members and Paul Quinn to form Son of a Bitch, which renamed itself Saxon in 1978. Dawson was a member of Saxon until 1986 when he was dismissed among conflict and arguments within the band. From 1996, Dawson and Oliver toured and recorded with Oliver/Dawson Saxon, at times featuring former Saxon drummers Pete Gill and Nigel Durham. In 2021, Dawson retired from music and stepped down from the group, after which the band renamed themselves Graham Oliver's Army.

In 2002, Dawson released a solo album called "Pandemonium Circus" with Durham on drums.

Dawson helped inspire This Is Spinal Tap. "It was only a few years ago that the penny dropped about Harry Shearer," he observed in 2014, "when he said he'd been on tour with Saxon and some of the character of Derek Smalls had been based on me – pointing at the audience and all that malarkey. Harry's lovely... I'm proud to be an influence on Spinal Tap. They're taking the piss, but that's part of the game, isn't it?"

On 21 March 2024, Dawson was convicted at Sheffield Crown Court of four counts of indecent assault against a person under the age of 14. The offences took place in the early 1990s when the victim was 6 years old. In April of the same year, he was sentenced to 5 years in prison for the offences.

== Discography ==
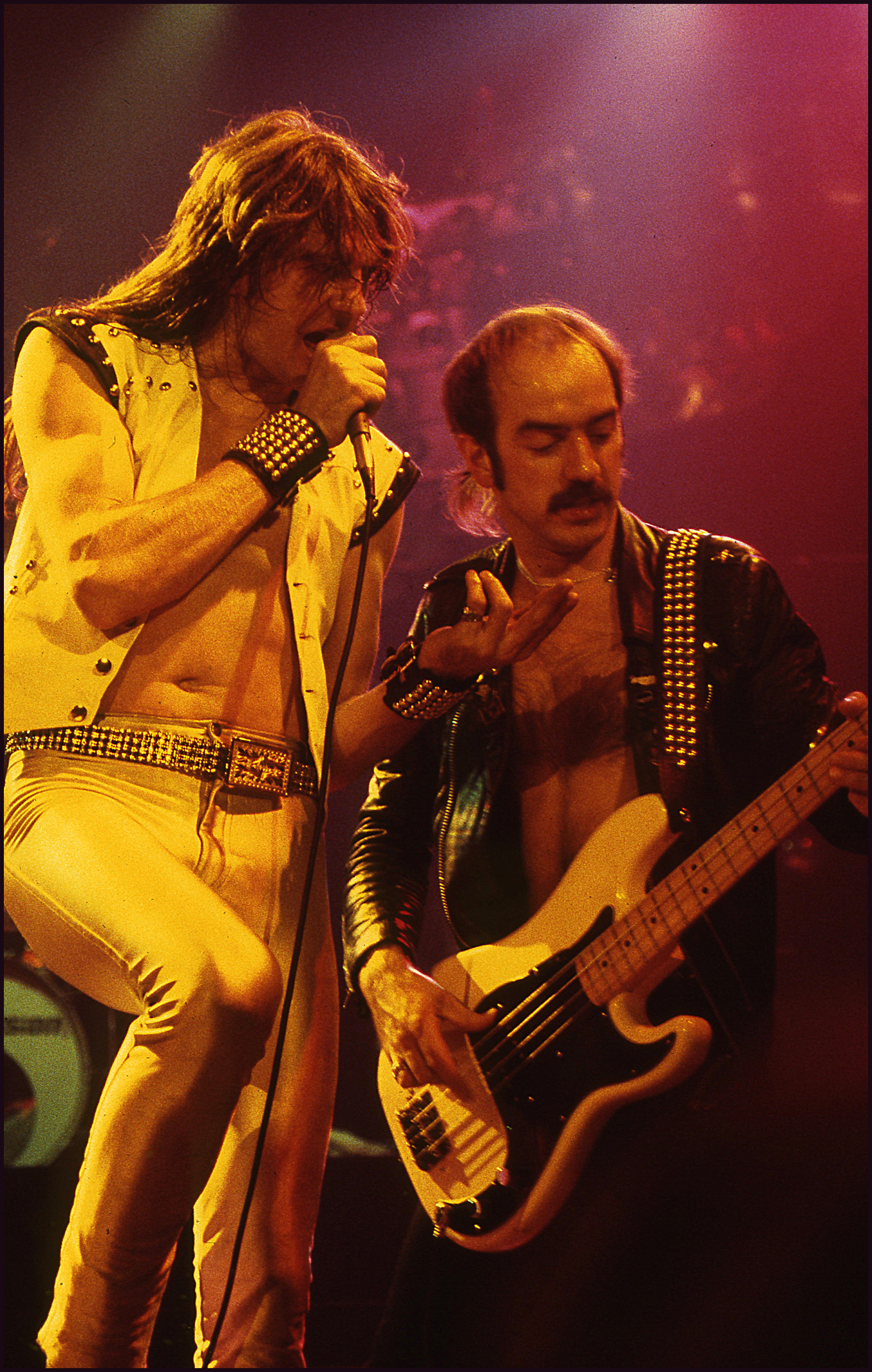
Dawson (right) and Biff Byford with Saxon in 1981

=== Saxon ===
- Saxon (1979)
- Wheels of Steel (1980)
- Strong Arm of the Law (1980)
- Denim and Leather (1981)
- The Eagle Has Landed (1982)
- Power & the Glory (1983)
- Crusader (1984)
- Innocence Is No Excuse (1985)
- Rock the Nations (1986) (songwriting)
- BBC Sessions (1999)
- Live at Donnington 1980 (2000)

=== Son of a Bitch ===
- Victim You (1996)

=== Oliver/Dawson Saxon ===
- Re://Landed (2000)
- It's Alive (2003)
- The Second Wave: 25 Years of NWOBHM (2003)
- Motorbiker (2012)

=== Steve Dawson ===
- Pandemonium Circus (2002)
