= The Bar-Steward Sons of Val Doonican =

English comedy folk and parody band

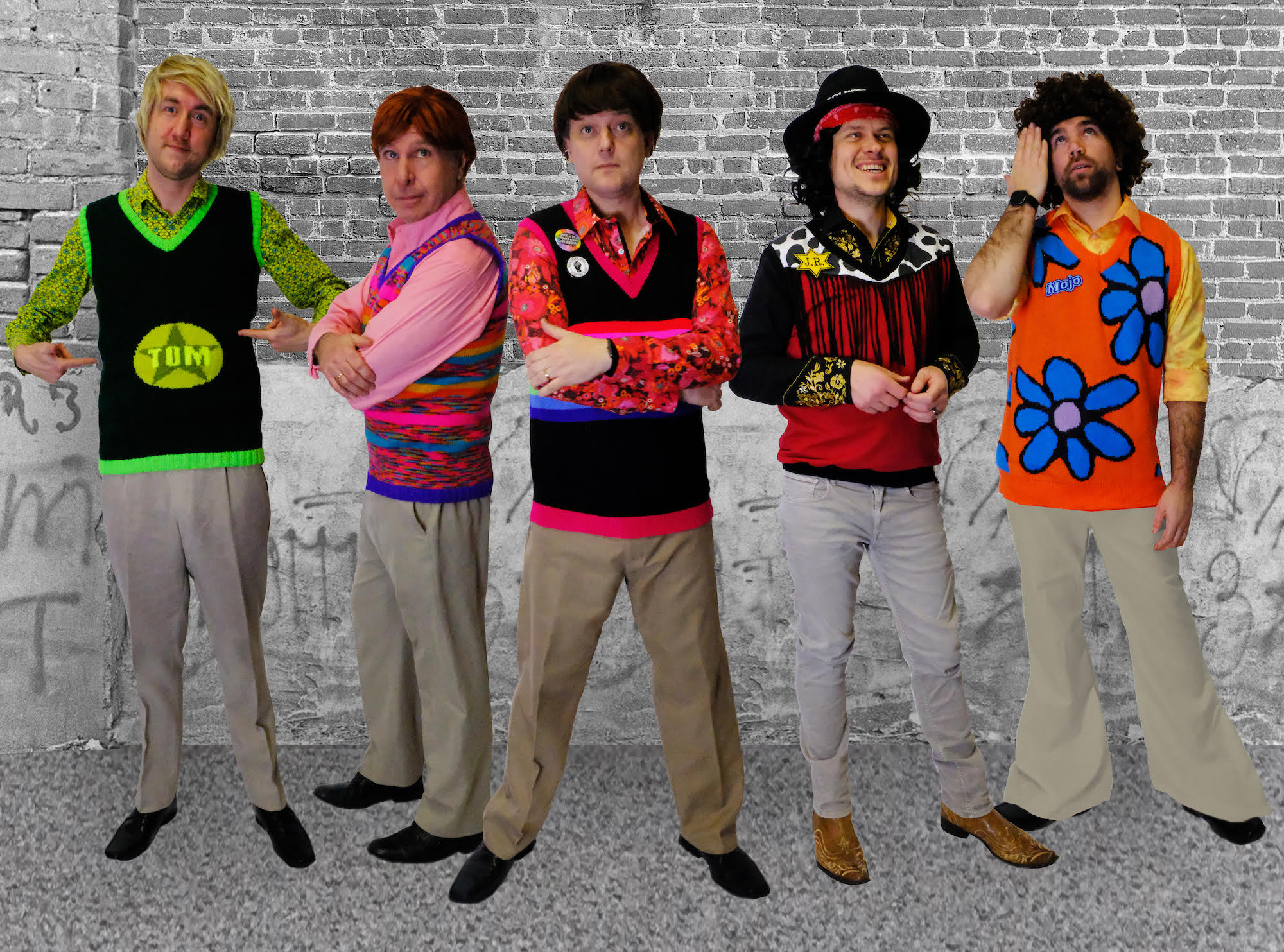
- l–r: Dave Doonican, Alan Doonican #2, Scott Doonican, J.R. Doonican, Mo-Jo Doonican

Background information
- Origin: Barnsley, South Yorkshire, England
- Genres: Folk music, parody music, pastiche
- Years active: 2006–present
- Label: Moon-On-A-Stick Records (their own independent label)
- Members: Scott Doonican (17 June 2006 – present); Alan Doonican #2 (25 October 2014 – present); Jeremiah Rickenbacker Doonican III (10 February 2024 – present); Mo-Jo Doonican (10 February 2024 – present); Dave Doonican (10 February 2024 – present)
- Website: www.thebarstewardsons.com

The Bar-Steward Sons of Val Doonican are a British comedy folk and parody band from Barnsley, South Yorkshire. Formed in 2006, they claim to be the hardest working comedy band in the UK, having played over 1450 shows throughout the UK. They are best known on the UK's festival scene, having played at major festivals including Glastonbury Festival, Cambridge Folk Festival, Beautiful Days, Bearded Theory, Rebellion Festival, Wychwood Festival, Kate Rusby's Underneath The Stars Festival, Towersey Festival, Wickham Festival, Shrewsbury Folk Festival and to an audience of 20,000 at Fairport's Cropredy Convention in August 2018, for their 900th show and again in 2022. Playing mainly acoustic folk instruments, they take popular songs and replace the lyrics with their own comedy reworkings, often on themes completely unrelated to the original song. They have built a prolific back catalogue, independently releasing fifteen physical studio albums (containing over 150 song parodies in total), and over fifty live albums, some of which are exclusive to their extensive digital Bandcamp discography. Presenting themselves as the long-lost children of Irish entertainer Val Doonican, and claiming to be "on a mission to keep their late, great spiritual father's legacy alive", the various members of the band have adopted the singer's surname for their shows, and wear brightly coloured hand-knitted tank-tops in tribute to Doonican's traditional knitwear.

== History ==
The band started out as an acoustic harmony duo consisting of Scott Doonican (vocals, acoustic guitar/banjo/mandolin/kazoo) and Danny Doonican (vocals, acoustic guitar), mainly covering quirky song choices by such disparate acts as Sparks, Queen, Judas Priest and Vera Lynn on folk instruments with Everly Brothers-styled harmonies.

The band's name and subsequent image was the idea of Scott's partner and long-standing co-lyricist Amanda White, inspired after they both saw a poster in Mojo's Records on Merchant's Arch in Temple Bar for the San Diego band The Bastard Sons of Johnny Cash, whilst on a weekend break to Dublin. Over several drinks in Sinnotts Bar on King Street South, they took Scott's original suggestion that they should take the tough sounding 'The Bastard Sons of' and add someone who ironically wasn't seen as a macho character. They continued to list different crooners or musicians renowned for covering other people's music in an attempt to find something ironically humorous. The shortlist included Bert Weedon, Matt Monro and Perry Como, however the 'Bastard' was soon softened to 'Bar-Steward' under Amanda's suggestion that it would only result in the band getting limited bookings because of the harshness of the name. Eventually Amanda suggested and then settled on Val Doonican and the band's uniform of knitted tank tops was born, a deliberate tribute to the Irish singer's loud jumpers as worn on his British TV show from the 1960s to the early 1990s.

They played their first show at Thawleys Pub in Wombwell, Barnsley on Saturday 17 June 2006. The pub is now a local convenience store. After their debut show, which was originally intended to be a one-off appearance, they decided to continue, and soon expanded to a three piece with the addition of Alan Doonican #1 on piano accordion, later self-releasing two albums of folky cover versions of classic rock songs (For Those About To Rock, Gently) and 1980s Number Ones (Back To The Day Job) on their independent Moon-On-A-Stick Records label, on which they continue to release albums to this day.

The song Tarnlife was later added to Cpl Kipper's Barnsley Trades Club Turn, their first full album as a comedy band, released in 2010. Its cover artwork mirrored that of Sgt. Pepper's Lonely Hearts Club Band by The Beatles, with 56 Barnsley celebrities gracing its front cover. The album was also notable for featuring the first of the band's several collaborations with guitarist Graham Oliver, founding member of heavy metal band Saxon.

Shortly after its release, Danny Doonican left the band, leaving Scott to complete the recording of 2011's The Dark Side Of The Tarn largely on his own.

Danny Doonican was succeeded by Andy Doonican in 2011, and the Mk.II line-up of Scott, Alan #1 and Andy recorded three further albums of parody songs between 2012 and 2014 ('EY UP! LET'S GO!, Sat'day Neet Fever and Talk Of The Tarn). In May 2014, the addition of Björn Doonicansson expanded the band to a quartet, and the departure of Alan Doonican #1 signalled the introduction of Alan Doonican #2 in October 2014 and the start of the band's Mk.III line-up. Over the next three years, the band recorded The Tarn Machine (2015), T'South 0 – Tarn 4 (2016), and 'Ave It : Bold As Brass (2017). Andy Doonican retired from the band in 2016.

In early 2018, the band re-recorded a collection of 21 of their most-loved songs for their eleventh studio album, a ten-year retrospective of their comedy years, The Bar-Steward Sons of Val Doonican/2008–2018. The album was independently crowdfunded and released on CD, double disc coloured vinyl and limited edition cassette.

In December 2018, the band released two charity Christmas singles via iTunes. The first single was their final annual collaboration with Maartin Allcock, who had died four months before, only weeks after performing with the band at Fairport's Cropredy Convention. The track, a prog-rock/traditional folk crossover rendition of Greg Lake's I Believe In Father Christmas, entered the iTunes chart, peaking at Number 33, and gaining a Number 80 position on the UK Official Charts for both downloads and sales on 21 December 2018. The second single, The Gasman Cometh, entered the iTunes chart reaching Number 55, and the iTunes comedy chart at Number 2. In the same week The Bar-Steward Sons of Val Doonican/2008–2018 reached Number 2 in the iTunes comedy chart. On 26 January 2019, spurred on by BBC Radio 6 ignoring an unprecedented barrage of fan requests for the song How Deep Is Your Glove? on social media, during a feature on Stuart Maconie's show called 'Sunday Glove Songs', the band defiantly released the track as a charity single for Prostate Cancer UK, and it entered the UK iTunes Comedy chart at Number 1.

Their twelfth studio album, entitled Place Of Spades was crowdfunded in early 2019. The Place Of Spades album was released and launched on Sunday 30 June 2019 at Glastonbury Festival when the band played the Avalon Stage. A Glastonbury live album, Avalon Calling was recorded during the show, and was given a limited edition CD release, which, on its announcement, sold out overnight, before being made available via digital download, a second press with different packaging and later a double pink vinyl release.

The band hosted their own music and comedy festival at The Old School House Venue in Barnsley in October 2019. Doonifest sold out over a year in advance, with a line-up including Graham Oliver from Saxon, Hobo Jones & The Junkyard Dogs, The Sweetchunks Band and many other comedy and musical acts from the UK's festival circuit. It was the venue's fastest sell-out, with all tickets going within 56 seconds, before a single act was announced. The festival also saw, original founding member, Danny Doonican, returning for one final show, as the original duo of Scott and Danny opened the festival with a set composed of early Doonicans cover versions and songs from the band's first album.

On 25 October 2019, the band played their 1000th show at the Palace Theatre in Redditch. The show was a sell-out and was filmed and recorded for a DVD and CD live album.

In January 2020, the band's twelfth studio album, Place Of Spades was the winner of a 'Jezzie Award' from Radio Bicester's 'Tarka Blowpig Music Show' after coming in at Number 1 and receiving the accolade of 'Studio Album of the Year - 2019', in a chart that featured The Who, Stormzy, Bruce Springsteen and Willie Nelson. Later in the same month, it was announced that the band would be supporting Levellers for their 2020 tour dates at Sheffield Leadmill, Holmfirth Picturedrome, Lancaster Town Hall and Nottingham Rock City. These shows were postponed until 2021 and 2022 due to a global pandemic of Coronavirus.

The 2020-2021 Global Coronavirus Pandemic caused the band to have to postpone their post-March 2020 tour dates, and as a result, Scott Doonican and his partner Amanda White, performed a series of weekly online shows, streamed on YouTube, under the title Scott Doonican's BIG NEET IN. The shows featured Scott performing live from home in his music room, interspersed with some previously recorded video footage of the full band, new music videos and collaborations between Scott and special guests, including Kathryn Roberts, Eliza Carthy, both Jeremy Cunningham and Simon Friend from the Levellers, 3 Daft Monkeys and Frank Turner amongst many others. The show also featured lots of regular puppet characters voiced and performed by Amanda. The show has continued beyond the pandemic with more sporadic episodes after 2021's Episode 66 'finale' which actually marked the band's return to live performances.

During the pandemic lockdowns, Scott and Amanda converted their garage into a pub, which was named The Pint & Puppet after their Saturday night exploits. A regular extension to their 2-3 hour livestream shows, would be an 'After-Show Party' in The Pint & Puppet, where Scott would play some covers of other artists, which would be broadcast via Facebook Live.

The fourth episode of Scott Doonican's BIG NEET IN on 18 April 2020 raised over £3000 for a local appeal to help to pay for material to make scrubs for Barnsley's NHS workers, due to the government's shortage of Personal Protective Equipment. After Amanda's mother died in Barnsley Hospital in November, after contracting the virus whilst in the hospital, the show that followed on 7 November 2020 (Show 33) raised over £2000 for the hospital ward she had been in at the time.

Although the band were announced to be playing at Bearded Theory, Fairport's Cropredy Convention, Beautiful Days Festival, Camper Calling, Underneath The Stars Festival, Wickham Festival, Costa Del Folk, Watchet Festival and several others in 2020, due to the pandemic, the festivals were postponed to 2021 or 2022 or cancelled.

Also during the coronavirus pandemic, Scott Doonican co-ordinated, produced, recorded and released a 10th Anniversary version of their Cpl. Kipper's Barnsley Trades Club Turn album, in October 2020. The album, re-recorded by Scott Doonican with additional contributions from Björn Doonicansson and Alan Doonican, and released in October 2020, also featured a host of special guests including Eliza Carthy, Dave Burland, Kate Rusby, Mike Harding, Graham Oliver, Hugh Whitaker, Kathryn Roberts, Ian McMillan, Barnsley blues-folk troubadour, Richard Kitson, and founder member Danny Doonican amongst others. The new version of the 'Barnsley Concept Album' was accompanied by a 120 page book written by Scott Doonican, entitled The Essential Listener's Guide To Cpl. Kipper's Barnsley Trades Club Turn, which contained the lyrics to the songs, and told the stories behind them and of the album's recording process.

Also during the lockdowns, Scott Doonican made a guest appearance on a version of Fairport Convention's Meet On The Ledge, featuring the members of Fairport Convention, Clannad, Turin Brakes, Ralph McTell, Martyn Joseph and many more. The song was released as a charity single to raise money for people in the music industry affected by the pandemic.

In late November 2021, the whole band commenced their first tour in two years due to the pandemic. The tour, which featured theatre-show dates in Salford, Ulpha, Banbury, Canterbury, Knutsford, Preston, York, Matlock Bath and Barnsley, also included three dates supporting the Levellers at Sheffield Leadmill, Morecambe Winter Gardens and Nottingham Rock City.

In May 2022, the band released their fourteenth studio album, Rugh & Ryf, after shelving it for two years due to coronavirus lock downs as a result of the global pandemic.

Over the summer of 2022 the band played a series of notable UK music festivals including Barnsley folk singer Kate Rusby's Underneath The Stars Festival, Wickham Festival, Fairport Convention's Cropredy Festival, the Levellers' Beautiful Days Festival and Watchet Festival in Somerset on the same weekend bill as Belinda Carlisle, The Fratellis and Level 42.

Festival dates were announced for Underneath The Stars Festival, Bearded Theory, Beautiful Days, Ely Folk Festival, Shrewsbury Folk Festival, Lindisfarne Festival and a second Big Day Out festival, after the success of the 2022 event.

Björn Doonicansson announced his departure in August 2023 before the Mk.III line-up of the band undertook their final winter tour together, ending in December 2023.

On 10 February 2024, Scott and Alan Doonican unveiled the three new members of the band's Mk.IV line-up in front of a sold out capacity crowd at the Rescue Rooms in Nottingham. This signalled the beginning of a new flexible five piece line-up, featuring Scott Doonican, Alan Doonican #2, Mo-Jo Doonican, Dave Doonican and Jeremiah Rickenbacker Doonican III. The debut show was recorded for the live album Doonicans In Concert. This line-up played the 2024 Glastonbury Festival at the Avalon Stage, on a bill that featured Lulu, Frank Turner, Skindred, Haircut 100 and Kate Nash. The show was recorded for the second disc of the double live LP Doonicans In Rock. The band performed on the main stage bill at Bearded Theory Festival on 25 May 2025 supporting the Manic Street Preachers on a weekend bill that included Paul Heaton and Iggy Pop and on the main stage at Wychwood Festival at Cheltenham Racecourse on 1 June 2025 supporting Doves and The Zutons.

The band's fifteenth studio album EVOLVER was recorded in the first half of 2025, with a release date of 20 September, featuring fourteen new songs, including parodies of seven UK Number 1 chart hits by acts including The Beatles, Jason Donovan, Gary Numan and The Kinks. The band toured from September to November 2025, performing the whole album and other fan favourites. Every show on the tour was a sell out. The album was positively reviewed in RnR Magazine, with the reviewer saying that the band "continue to offer clever wordplay, sharp satire and plenty of Yorkshire wit... it's hard enough to do this stuff as a one-off; to repeat the feat over multiple albums is surely the work of twisted genius".

During two seasonal specials of Scott Doonican's BIG NEET IN on Christmas Eve and New Year's Eve 2025, it was announced that the band would be celebrating their 20th Birthday at Birdwell Venue in Barnsley on 20 June 2026, with a fourth BIG DAY OUT Festival, with The Bar-Steward Sons of Val Doonican as headliners, and with support from nine other acts including John Otway and Kathryn Roberts & Sean Lakeman.

At the outset of 2026, Scott Doonican embarked on a short series of special One Man Show dates under the title of 'Magical History Tour', during which he recounted events from the band's twenty year history via storytelling and songs. All eight shows were sell-outs, and the final night at The Lantern Theatre in Sheffield was also the first show to ever be live-streamed from the theatre in its 133 year history, reaching beyond Sheffield to as far as Missouri in the United States of America.

Meanwhile, the band continued their EVOLVER Tour into a second leg between January and May, taking the total number of times the band played the majority of their fifteenth studio album up to thirty. These shows also sold out completely.

Early in 2026, Scott Doonican also re-recorded the whole of the 2011 album The Dark Side of the Tarn for its 15th Anniversary. The new version included rewritten songs, a cover of Arnold Layne by Pink Floyd and a new song donated and written by Steve Knightley from Show Of Hands.

In late May 2026, the band supported the indie rock band Garbage at Bearded Theory Festival, on a bill that also included Neville Staple from The Specials and Kae Tempest.

On 17 June 2026, the twentieth anniversary of the band's first show, Scott Doonican released Magical History Tour, a live album recorded on the final night of the tour of the same name. Three days later on 20 June, the band headlined The 20th Birthday BIG DAY OUT festival at Birdwell Venue in Barnsley. The all day 500 capacity sold out event featured ten acts including John Otway, Kathryn Roberts & Sean Lakeman and Headsticks.

On 23 August 2026, the band brought their seventh annual Sunday Service show to Beautiful Days Festival in Devon, where they opened the final day, which also featured Levellers, The Wonder Stuff, Richard Thompson and The Beta Band. The show featured several special guest appearances from festival favourites Kathryn Roberts, Woodkern, Samantics, Dog 'Ole, The Kabins and Aubrey Blakeledge amongst others. The following weekend, the band supported Nile Rodgers & Chic on Camper Calling's main stage bill.

From September to November the band embarked on the first leg of their 20th Anniversary Tour, doing 20 shows to commemorate 20 years. Following the sell-out dates from the 2025-2026 EVOLVER Tour, all twenty shows also sold out, which meant that all of the band's 2026 shows were sell-outs, and they had accumulated 52 consecutive sell-outs in total.

== Influences ==
Scott Doonican, in an interview with Farmer Phil's Festival in 2016, named his musical comedy influences as Mike Harding, Jasper Carrott and Richard Digance and claimed that "I wanted to mix the folk-comedy of my personal comic-hero, Mike Harding, with the onstage audience-interaction and stadium rock-esque antics of Freddie Mercury, in order to form the world's greatest comedy folk-band in knitwear".

== Live shows ==
The band have played over 1460 shows to date, and proclaim on their website that they are "The hardest-working comedy band in the UK". The band's live shows range from full band shows, to solo acoustic shows by Scott Doonican. The band are regulars on the UK festival scene, and have also supported a number of diverse acts including Nile Rodgers, Levellers, Chas & Dave, Roy Wood, John Otway, Fairport Convention, Manic Street Preachers, Eliza Carthy, Tony Christie, The Flaming Lips, Garbage and The Darkness.

Band shows are often enhanced by audience participation and various set-pieces.

The band regularly invite other musicians to play with them. At Fairport's Cropredy Convention in August 2018, former Fairport Convention multi-instrumentalist Maartin Allcock, complete with Doonican-style tank-top, joined them for the finale on bass guitar, at Beautiful Days 2017 they were joined by Eliza Carthy, and at Whitwell Festival of Music in 2015, they were joined by Graham Oliver guitarist and founding member of Yorkshire heavy metal band Saxon. Scott also joined Graham Oliver's Saxon on stage that same evening, brandishing a banjulele for Saxon song Wheels Of Steel (which the Doonicans covered as a hidden track on their 2017 album, 'Ave It : Bold As Brass), and again at the band's own 'Doonifest' in October 2019.

In February 2019, the band announced the date for their 1000th show, to take place at The Palace Theatre in Redditch, Worcestershire on 25 October 2019, which was a sell-out. The band later announced and successfully crowdfunded a project to film and record a live DVD and double album on the night of the show.

== Reception ==
Jeff Robson, reviewing their 11 August 2018 show at Fairport's Cropredy Convention for the Independent, said "... The Bar Steward Sons of Val Doonican were the highlights of a rainy Saturday afternoon, swearily lampooning a genre that sometimes takes itself too seriously.", whilst another review of the same show said "... complete with fluorescent tank tops and dodgy wigs [they] were an absolute highlight."

Reviewing the band's support act to the Levellers at Leamington Assembly in 2015, What's On West Midlands said "the Barnsley Boys left the audience in stitches with their exquisitely crafted parodies ... there was nevertheless some surprisingly excellent musicianship."

John Atkin, reviewing 'Ave It: Bold As Brass in RnR Magazine, said "Bristles with proper belly-laugh moments... a LOL-a-minute through a variety of perfect pastiches. If there is any justice, the Doonicans deserve to be all over your Saturday night telly."

In a review of Bearded Theory Festival 2016, UK Festival Guides said "I couldn't fail to mention a gig by The Bar-Steward Sons of Val Doonican that left even them speechless at the sheer size, volume and enthusiasm of the audience, the impact these boys have wherever they go is utterly phenomenal", whilst at the same festival two years later, the reviewer noted "Rapidly becoming the must-have, must-see festival band, the Bar-Steward Sons of Val Doonican played to an over-capacity Woodland Stage arena as hundreds queued for a chance at catching their much-anticipated antics". A review of a smaller venue show said "They simply take all the songs you cannot get out of your head – everything from The Police to Kings of Leon – and twist the lyrics beyond recognition while wearing gloriously outrageous multi-coloured tank tops."

In July 2017, comedian Jason Manford described their performance at Underneath The Stars Festival as "great fun" on his Twitter account, whilst eFestivals described their performance at Off The Tracks festival the same year with "Like a modern-day version of the Barron Knights, they take popular songs, amend the words and twist them into hilarious folk parodies." Manford saw the band again at Underneath The Stars Festival on Sat 30 July 2022, and via Instagram said that "when the North goes independent I'm suggesting this is our national anthem" with an attached video of the band performing their ode to 'real gravy', 'Too Good To Be Jus'.

In the foreword of Scott Doonican's book of the band's lyrics Songs In The Key Of Tarn, folk musician Eliza Carthy describes the band as "a ridiculous family of genius, hilarious, irresistible music makers, currently crowd surfing to the bar all over the great county of Yorkshire and beyond, into the venues and music festivals of the UK".

Folk musician and comedian Mike Harding said on his "Folk Show" podcast #177 in 2016 that "The Bar-Steward Sons of Val Doonican are very, very funny... one of the hardest working bands on the planet". In the broadcast of his 273rd Folk Show podcast in Sept 2019 he described the band as "some of the funniest men on the planet... I would call them parodists extraordinaire". On 12 April 2019, the Staffordshire Sentinel published a headline about the band's appearance at Leek Arts Festival, describing them to be "like The Barron Knights - on speed", going on to say "Their hilarious parodies of popular songs will leave you crying tears of laughter".

Mike Scialom, writing for the Cambridge Independent, said that the band's headline set at Cambridge Folk Festival's Club Stage was "another festival highlight". It went on to say that the "irreverent, madcap trio, insisting they were quite posh really, included defence of their home town, Barnsley: 'In most cities people smoke spice, but in Barnsley everyone smokes basil... they buy the Radio Times when it's not even Christmas, that's how posh it is'."

During their appearance at Kate Rusby's Underneath The Stars Festival in August 2019, in a review by Louder Than War journalist Gareth Allen wrote, "The Bar-Steward Sons of Val Doonican's reputation preceded them and they didn't disappoint, resplendent in the most garish of tank tops imaginable... without doubt these guys can really play. Led by the inimitable Scott Doonican, everyone is jumping, as metal-head culture joins folk and hip-hop in an intoxicating mix". The Yorkshire Evening Post described the band at the same show as "hilarious".

RnR Magazine, reviewing Place Of Spades in September 2019, described the album as "the summit of musical comedy. Scott Doonican's attention to detail is what sets the Doonicans ahead of all the contenders in this genre. These are lovingly crafted pastiches with tonnes of subtle layers". They went on to say that it was "the strongest Doonicans album yet".

During a Lives In Music interview with Robin Valk, in March 2020, Fairport Convention bassist Dave Pegg said, "one band I really love, are a bit of a comedy act, and an act that you will wanna go and see over and over again, called The Bar-Steward Sons of Val Doonican... a great name, but absolutely hilarious."

On 6 July 2020, via her Underneath The Stars Festival social media, folk singer Kate Rusby said, "The 8th wonder of the world is actually in Yorkshire... a wonderful Yorkshire genius collective known as The Bar-Steward Sons of Val Doonican. To see them is to know true magnificence and we love em to bits!"

During the final interview of Scott Doonican's BIG NEET IN (led by puppet anchor-lady Gloria McGlumpher - voiced by Scott Doonican's partner Amanda White along with Scott during show #66), guest collaborator and interviewee Frank Turner described his experience as "the best interview I have ever done".

At Bearded Theory Festival in Derbyshire on Sunday 29 May 2022, Wayne Coyne from headline act The Flaming Lips said to Scott Doonican on seeing the band's stage wear, "Oh man! You guys look even crazier than us!".

In the July/August 2022 edition of RnR Magazine, the band's studio album, Rugh & Ryf, was described as the band's "masterpiece... with lyrics full of pith and vinegar, wrapped in dubious DayGlo knitwear... that will have the folkies quaking to the depths of their Trad. Arr. souls".

Reviewing the debut appearance of the Mk.IV line-up of Scott, Alan, J.R., Mo-Jo and Dave Doonican at the Rescue Rooms in Nottingham on 10 February 2024, Tanya Russell of Lyric Lounge Review said, "This was not just a musical performance; it was an art form, perfected by hours of diligent rehearsal and a clear passion for live entertainment. It’s clear why The Bar-Steward Sons of Val Doonican have garnered such a dedicated following... their shows are not just about the music; they’re about the experience, the atmosphere, and the joy of shared laughter. It’s a rare and beautiful thing to see a band so in tune with their audience, so dedicated to their art, and so capable of delivering a show that resonates on so many levels."

On 9 February 2025, Lyric Lounge Review reviewed the Mk.IV incarnation of the band's first anniversary show at Nottingham Rescue Rooms and said, "The band has always been about more than just laughs – underneath the daft lyrics and the outrageous stage outfits lies a group of seriously talented musicians. They are not just keeping the show on the road – they are pushing forward, refining their craft, and proving that they are stronger than ever. Ultimately, they have always been about delivering joy, and in this latest incarnation, they’re doing it better than ever. Long may they continue. I would say that the band have matured over the last year… but that would be a barefaced lie, and frankly, I’d be worried if they had".

== Discography ==
This is an abridged list of albums; the band have also released over 50 live shows on CD or in download format, via their own independent label, Moon-On-A-Stick Records. All of the artwork for the front covers of the band's studio albums, and a significant number of their live albums are pastiches of classic album covers.

=== Studio albums ===
- For Those About To Rock... But Gently (2007)
- Back To The Day Job (2009)
- Cpl Kipper's Barnsley Trades Club Turn (2010)
- The Dark Side Of The Tarn (2011)
- 'EY UP! LET'S GO! (2012)
- Sat'day Neet Fever (2013)
- Talk Of The Tarn (2014)
- The Tarn Machine (2015)
- T'South 0 – Tarn 4 (2016)
- Ave It: Bold As Brass (2017)
- The Bar-Steward Sons of Val Doonican/2008-2018 (2018)
- Place Of Spades (2019)
- Cpl. Kipper's Barnsley Trades Club Turn - 10th Anniversary Edition (2020)
- Rugh & Ryf (2022)
- Evolver (2025)
- The Dark Side Of The Tarn (Redux) - 15th Anniversary Edition (2026)

=== Live albums ===
The band have released countless live albums since their conception, all self-released. Some have been given a physical release and there are many more released digitally as part of the band's regularly expanding 'Official Bar-Steward Bootlegs Series'. Physical releases since 2023 include:

- SOUP (2023) Scott Doonican recorded live at Katie Fitzgerald's in Stourbridge. This album was released on both CD and vinyl.
- Doonicans In Concert (2024) The Mk.IV line-up of the band's debut show recorded live at the Rescue Rooms in Nottingham.
- MARMITE (2024) Scott Doonican recorded live at The Guildhall in Lichfield, Katie Fitzgerald's in Stourbridge and The Lantern Theatre in Sheffield.
- Doonicans In Rock (2025) The band recorded live at Chipping Norton Theatre and Glastonbury Festival.
- Magical History Tour (2026) Scott Doonican tells the two decades long history of the band to celebrate its 20th Anniversary. Recorded live at The Lantern Theatre, Sheffield.

=== Other media ===
==== DVDs ====
- The Tarn Machine Live (2015)
- Live & Lairy at Fairport's Cropredy Convention (2018)
- The Bar-Steward Sons of Val Doonican Live At The Palace Theatre (2019) Filmed live at the Palace Theatre, Redditch on 25 October 2019, the night of the band's 1000th show.

==== Books ====
- Songs In The Key Of Tarn (2015) A book of the band's lyrics and the stories behind them, written by Scott Doonican, with a foreword written by Eliza Carthy MBE. The book was revised for a significantly extended 2nd edition in 2017.
- The Essential Listener's Guide To Cpl. Kipper's Barnsley Trades Club Turn (2020) A book to accompany the 10th Anniversary version of Cpl. Kipper's Barnsley Trades Club Turn, containing the lyrics and stories behind the songs along with commentary on the recording process, written by Scott Doonican, with a foreword written by Ringo Starr MBE

== Members ==
=== Current members ===
- Scott Doonican – Vocals, acoustic guitar, banjulele, electric synthesiser ukulele, Suzuki Omnichord OM-27, Suzuki Omnichord OM-108, kazoo, dinghy (17 June 2006 – present)
- Alan Doonican #2 – Vocals, piano accordion, keyboards, keytar, ukulele. (25 October 2014 – present)
- Rt. Rev. Jeremiah Rickenbacker Doonican III – Vocals, mandolin, 5-string banjo, fiddle, guitar, trombone, helicon. (10 February 2024 – present)
- Mo-Jo Doonican – Vocals, mandolin, 5-string banjo, bouzouki, kick drum, bass guitar. (10 February 2024 – present)
- Dave Doonican – Vocals, bass guitar, piano, electric guitar, acoustic guitar. (10 February 2024 – present)

=== Former and part-time members ===
- Danny Doonican – vocals, acoustic guitar (17 June 2006 – 17 March 2011)
- Alan Doonican #1 – piano accordion (24 June 2006 – 4 October 2014)
- Andy Doonican – 12-string acoustic guitar, bass guitar, ukulele (8 April 2011 – 17 June 2016)
- Björn Doonicansson - mandolin, tenor banjo, violin, vocals (20 April 2014 – 19 December 2023)
- Mushroom Doonican - bass guitar, vocals (part-time member of 'The Bar-Steward Big Band' 21 August 2022 - 25 May 2025)
- Dalgas Doonican - drums (part-time member of 'The Bar-Steward Big Band' 21 August 2022 - 25 May 2025)
- Keith Moonican - drums (part-time member of 'The Bar-Steward Big Band' 15 August 2021 – 9 October 2021)
- Sarah Doonican - British Sign Language Interpreter (part-time member at sporadic shows from 21 May 2015 - present)
