= Mike Harding =

British musician (born 1944)

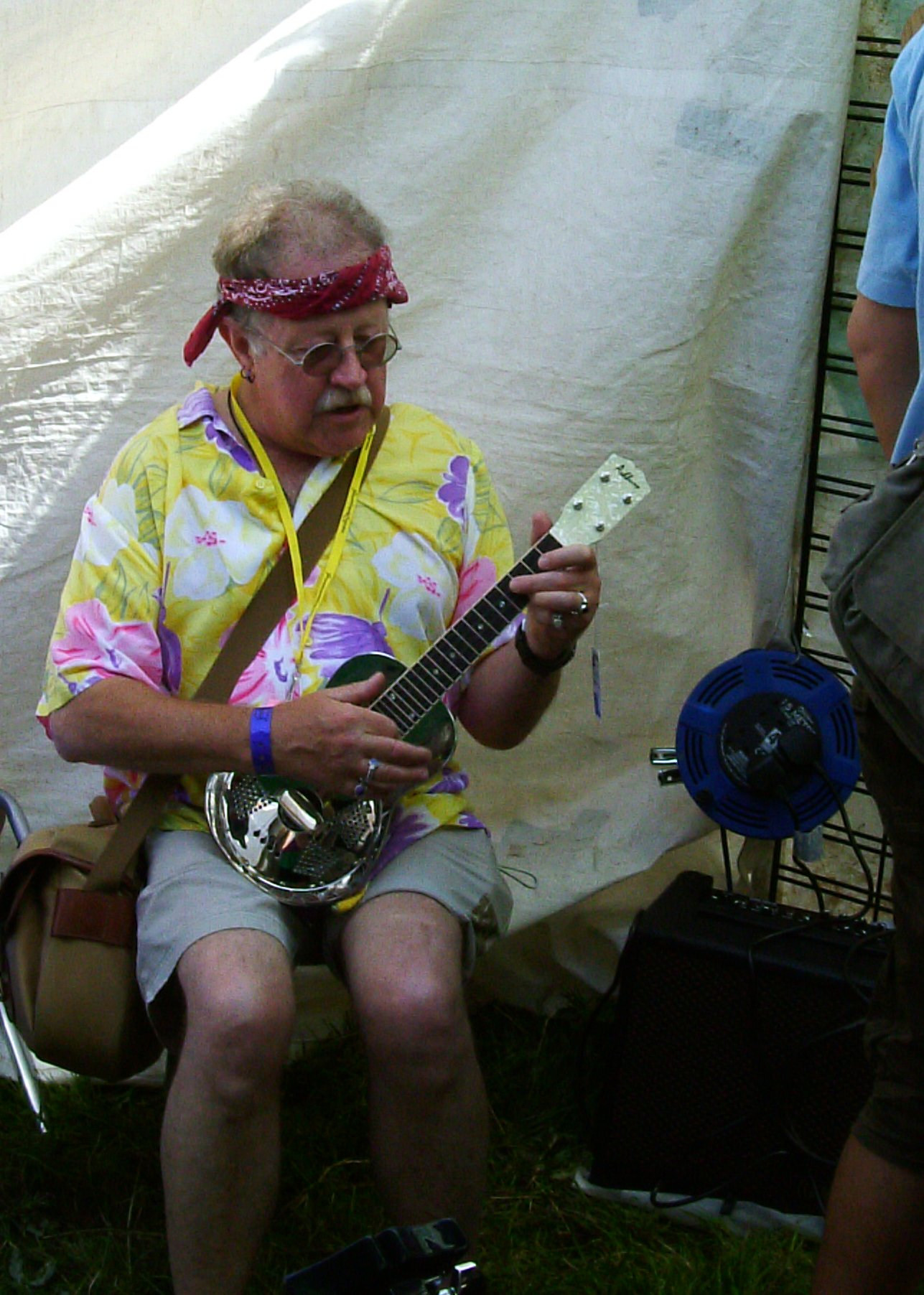
- Harding at Fairport's Cropredy Convention in 2007

Background information
- Born: 1944 (age 81–82); Manchester, England
- Education: University of Manchester
- Genres: Folk music; easy listening
- Occupations: Singer; songwriter; author; poet; broadcaster
- Instruments: Vocals; guitar; piano; banjo; mandolin; ukulele; concertina; harmonica; dulcimer; autoharp; cittern; tin whistle
- Years active: 1965–present
- Labels: Rubber; Philips; Moonraker
- Website: mikeharding.co.uk

Mike Harding (born 1944) is an English singer, songwriter, comedian, writer, broadcaster and musician.

== Early life and education ==
Mike Harding was born in Crumpsall, Manchester, His father, Louis Arthur "Curly" Harding, a navigator in the RAF, was killed in the Second World War, a month before his son's birth.

Harding was educated at St Anne's, Crumpsall, and St Bede's College in Manchester. He has written of the abuse inflicted on pupils at St Bede's, a Roman Catholic school. After a varied career as a road digger, dustbin man, schoolteacher, steel erector, bus conductor, boiler scaler, and chemical factory worker, he took a degree in English and Education at the University of Manchester.

== Career ==
Harding began performing as a folk singer and as a member of several local Manchester bands in the 1960s, making his first recordings for the Topic label. He began telling jokes between songs, eventually extending them into longer humorous anecdotes which became the main focus of his act. He released his first album, A Lancashire Lad, in 1972, followed by Mrs 'Ardin's Kid in 1974. In 1975, the single release of "The Rochdale Cowboy" reached No. 22 in the UK Singles Chart, and brought him national attention.

As a stand-up comic he made several series for the BBC and appeared on numerous television and radio programmes, including two series of travel films in Ireland and the Appalachian Mountains of America. He also played rock and roll with his band, the Stylos, with the Lowe Brothers. He has had many albums and singles released, whilst the latter included "Man 'nited Song".

As well as comedy, he has released albums of serious songs, most notably Bombers' Moon, the title track of which tells of his father's death.

Harding composed the music scores for Danger Mouse, Count Duckula (he also sang the main and end titles with Manchester native Doreen Edwards), The Reluctant Dragon and The Fool of the World and the Flying Ship for Cosgrove Hall Films.

He wrote The Armchair Anarchist's Almanac, a humorous A to Z book; two collections of anecdotes, jokes and songs entitled The Unluckiest Man in the World and The 14½ Pound Budgie; and a comedy/thriller/fantasy, Killer Budgies. His other books include a series covering aspects of his interest in British folklore and history – The Little Book of the Green Man, The Little Book of Stained Glass, The Little Book of Gargoyles, and The Little Book of Misericords; and the loosely factual autobiography, You Can See the Angel's Bum, Miss Worswick! He also read two of his short stories for Afternoon Story on BBC Radio 4.

Harding made a series of 14 short films on minority religions in England for the BBC's Heaven and Earth show. Harding has presented the annual BBC Radio 2 Folk Awards, and from 1997 to 2012 he presented the weekly BBC Radio 2 flagship folk and roots programme, The Mike Harding Show. His last show was on 26 December 2012. According to Mark Radcliffe, who took over Radio 2's Folk Show, Harding had left reluctantly, stating that the BBC had "sold the folk world down the river". Four days later, on 30 December 2012, Harding launched his own internet radio show, called The Mike Harding Folk Show, broadcast at 5pm every Sunday and available as a podcast and on iTunes afterwards.

== Other activities ==
Harding is a hillwalker and a former president, and then life vice president of the Ramblers' Association. He wrote, until a new format was sought for the magazine in 2008, a regular column for hiking magazine The Great Outdoors and campaigned for 'Right to Roam' legislation in the United Kingdom. He is one of the patrons of the Wensleydale Railway, a group set up to re-open the once mainly derelict line between Northallerton and Garsdale in Yorkshire, near where he now lives.

He is also the patron of Settle Stories, a charity based in Settle, North Yorkshire, that promotes traditional storytelling and runs the annual Settle Storytelling Festival.

== Discography ==
=== Albums ===
- A Lancashire Lad (1972, Trailer LER 2039)
- There Was This Bloke (1974 Rubber Records RUB 010) with Tony Capstick, Derek Brimstone and Bill Barclay
- Mrs 'Ardin's Kid (1975, Rubber Records RUB 011) – UK No.24
- The Rochdale Cowboy Rides Again (1975, Rubber Records RUB 015/016)
- One Man Show (1976, Philips 6625 022) – UK No.19
- Old Four Eyes is Back (1977, Philips 6308 290) – UK No.31
- Captain Paralytic & The Brown Ale Cowboys (1978, Philips 6641 798) – UK No.60
- On The Touchline (1979, Philips 9109 230)
- Komic Kutz (1979, Philips 6625 041)
- Red Specs Album (1981, Polydor 2383 601)
- Take Your Fingers Off It (1982, Moonraker MOO1)
- Rooted! (1983, Moonraker MOO2)
- Flat Dogs and Shaky Pudden (1983, BBC Records REH 468)
- Bomber's Moon (1984, Moonraker MOO3)
- Roll Over Cecil Sharpe (1985, Moonraker MOO7)
- Foo Foo Shufflewick & Her Exotic Banana (1986, Moonraker MOO8)
- The Best of Mike Harding (1986, Rubber Records RUB 047)
- Plutonium Alley (1989, Moonraker MOO9)
- God's Own Drunk (1989, Moonraker MOO10)
- Footloose in the Himalaya (1990, Moonraker MOOC11)
- Chinese Takeaway Blues (1992, Moonraker MOO11)
- The Bubbly Snot Monster (1994, Moonraker MOO14)
- Classic Tracks (1995, Moonraker CD MOO13)

=== Singles ===
- "Rochdale Cowboy" / "Strangeways Hotel" (1975, Rubber Records ADUB 3) – UK No.22
- "My Brother Sylveste" / "Uncle Joe's Mint Balls" (1976, Rubber Records ADUB 4)
- "Talking Blackpool Blues" / "Bogey Man" (1976, Rubber Records ADUB 10)
- Guilty, But Insane (EP): includes "Born Bad" / "Jimmy Spoons" / "Manuel" (1977, Philips CLOG 1)
- "Christmas 1914" / "P.S. God" (1977, Philips 6006 585)
- "Disco Vampire" / "For Carlo" (1977, Philips CLOG 2)

=== Other recordings ===
- "Ale is Physick for Me" / "Ten Per Cent" on Deep Lancashire (1968, Topic 12T 188)
- "Sammy Shuttleworth" on Owdham Edge (1970, Topic 12T 204)
- "Ale is Physick for Me" / "Ten Per Cent" / Sammy Shuttleworth" on Deep Lancashire (1997, Topic TSCD 485)
- "Ale is Physick for Me" on And We'll All Have Tea (2000, Retro R2CD)

=== Collaborations ===
- Plays tenor banjo and harmonica on "Jump Ararnd" with The Bar-Steward Sons of Val Doonican, Maartin Allcock, Eliza Carthy, Hugh Whitaker and Graham Oliver, on The Bar-Steward Sons of Val Doonican 2008-2018 (2018, Moon-On-A-Stick Records BSVD008)
- Plays the voice of The Devil on "The Devil Went Darn To Barnsley" with The Bar-Steward Sons of Val Doonican, Maartin Allcock, Eliza Carthy and Graham Oliver, on the album The Bar-Steward Sons of Val Doonican 2008-2018 (2018, Moon-On-A-Stick Records BSVD008)
- Plays harmonica on "Wath-On-Dearne Blues", a cover of one of his own comedy compositions, with The Bar-Steward Sons of Val Doonican, also accompanied by Graham Oliver founder guitarist with heavy metal band Saxon and Barnsley blues singer songwriter Richard Kitson, on the album Cpl. Kipper's Barnsley Trades Club Turn (2020, Moon-On-A-Stick Records BSVD-KIP2020) .

== Publications ==
- Napoleon's Retreat From Wigan (1976, EMI Music Ltd)
- The Unluckiest Man in the World (1979, Robson)
- The Singing Street (1979, Moonraker)
- The Witch That Nicked Christmas (1979)
- Folk Songs of Lancashire (1980, Whitethorn)
- Fur Coat and No Knickers (play) (1980, Samuel French)
- Barnaby Barnaby Boy Wonder (1980, Robson)
- The 14½ lb Budgie (1980, Robson)
- Up The Boo Aye Shooting Pookakis (1980, Savoy)
- The Armchair Anarchist's Almanac (1981, Robson)
- One Night Stand (play) (1981)
- Hell Bent (play) (1981)
- Dead Ernest (play) (1982)
- Not with a Bang (play) (1983, Samuel French)
- Killer Budgies (1983, Robson)
- When The Martians Land in Huddersfield (1984, Robson)
- You Can See The Angel's Bum, Miss Worswick (1985, Robson)
- Rambling On (1986, Robson)
- Walking The Dales (1986, Michael Joseph)
- Cooking One's Corgi (1988, Robson)
- Bomber's Moon (1988, Michael Joseph)
- Footloose in the Himalaya (1989, Michael Joseph)
- Last Tango in Whitby (play) (1990, Samuel French)
- A Free Man on Sunday (play) (1992)
- Daddy Edgar's Pools (1992, Peterloo Poets)
- Walking the Peak and Pennine (1992, Michael Joseph)
- Tales from the Towpath (1992, Central Manchester Development Corporation)
- The Virgin of the Discos (1993, Robson)
- Hypnotising the Cat (1995, Robson)
- Buns for the Elephants (1995, Penguin Viking)
- Footloose in the West of Ireland (1996, Michael Joseph)
- Crystal Set Dreams (1997, Peterloo Poets)
- Comfort and Joy (play) (1997, Samuel French)
- A Little Book of the Green Man (1998, Aurum Press)
- A Little Book of Gargoyles (1998, Aurum Press)
- A Little Book of Stained Glass (1998, Aurum Press)
- A Little Book of Devils and Demons (1998, Aurum Press)
- A Little Book of Misericords (1998, Aurum Press)
- Yorkshire Transvestite Found Dead on Everest (2005, Hayloft)
- A Little Book of Angels (2008, Aurum Press)
- A Little Book of Tombs and Monuments (2008, Aurum Press)
- A Little Book of Miracles and Marvels (2008, Aurum Press)
- The VW Camper Van A Biography (2013, Aurum Press )
- The Adventures of the Crumpsall Kid (Biography) (2015, Michael O'Mara Books Ltd)

== Awards ==
- Fellow of the Royal Geographical Society
- Shortlisted for the Boardman Tasker Award for Mountaineering Literature
- Ralph Lewis Poetry Award (University of Sussex)
- 1991 Outdoor Writers Guild Award for Excellence for Footloose in the Himalaya (broadcast)
- 1996 The Signal Award for Children's Poetry

== See also ==
- List of Scouts
- Folk music of England
