= Strong Arm of the Law =

Studio album by Saxon
- Released: 7 November 1980
- Recorded: May–August 1980
- Studio: Ramport (London)
- Genre: Heavy metal
- Length: 38:00
- Label: Carrere
- Producers: Pete Hinton, Saxon

Saxon chronology
Wheels of Steel (1980)	Strong Arm of the Law (1980)	Denim and Leather (1981)

Singles from Strong Arm of the Law
- 1. "Strong Arm of the Law" Released: November 1980

Strong Arm of The Law is the third studio album by English heavy metal band Saxon. It was released in 1980, seven months after Wheels of Steel, and debuted on the UK chart at #11.

== Background, music and lyrics ==
According to Ultimate Classic Rock, the album is a "building block of the New Wave of British Heavy Metal," calling the track Heavy Metal Thunder "genre defining." The title track, "Strong Arm of the Law," has been described as "hard-grooving" musically. According to guitarist Graham Oliver, the track was inspired by an incident where the band was driving in Whitehall and was subsequently pulled over and searched by the security detail of then British prime minister, Margaret Thatcher. The album's final track, "Dallas 1 PM" concerns the assassination of John F. Kennedy. "We thought, 'Should we put one shot in there or should we put three?'" recalled singer Biff Byford. "In the end we went down the conspiracy theory route and had three shots."

== Critical reception ==
Professional ratings
Review scores
Source	Rating
AllMusic	4.5/5 stars
Collector's Guide to Heavy Metal	7/10
Sputnikmusic	4.5/5 stars

Eduardo Rivadavia of AllMusic called the album "equally timeless" to its predecessor, Wheels of Steel and commented, "All the right ingredients pretty much fell into place for Saxon on this amazing record, and though it lacked as many clear-cut hits as its predecessor, Strong Arm of the Law's unmatched consistency from start to finish makes it the definitive Saxon album in the eyes of many fans and critics." After their peak with Wheels of Steel, Canadian journalist Martin Popoff was a little disappointed, calling the album "comfortable and nostalgic if never remarkable", but "definitely betraying Saxon's lack of ideas"; despite their "stripped, basic and enthusiastic delivery of metal... creatively Saxon was getting left in the dust, both looking and sounding a bit like Slade."

== Track listing ==
=== UK Track listing ===
All tracks are written by Biff Byford, Paul Quinn, Graham Oliver, Steve Dawson and Pete Gill.

Side one
No.	Title	Length
1.	"Heavy Metal Thunder"	4:24
2.	"To Hell and Back Again"	4:52
3.	"Strong Arm of the Law"	4:47
4.	"Taking Your Chances"	4:25

Side two
No.	Title	Length
5.	"20,000 Ft."	3:30
6.	"Hungry Years"	5:18
7.	"Sixth Form Girls"	4:18
8.	"Dallas 1 PM"	6:27

=== US Track listing ===
Side one
No.	Title	Length
1.	"Dallas 1 PM"	6:27
2.	"Strong Arm of the Law"	4:47
3.	"Sixth Form Girls"	4:18
4.	"Hungry Years"	5:18

Side two
No.	Title	Length
5.	"Heavy Metal Thunder"	4:24
6.	"Taking Your Chances"	4:25
7.	"To Hell and Back Again"	4:52
8.	"20,000 Ft"	3:30

2006 reissue bonus tracks
No.	Title	Length
9.	"20,000 Ft." (Live)	3:30
10.	"Dallas 1 PM" (Live)	6:18
11.	"Hungry Years" (Live)	5:56
12.	"Strong Arm of the Law" (Live)	4:52
13.	"Heavy Metal Thunder" (Live)	4:01

Tracks 9 to 13 recorded live at the Hammersmith Odeon on 15 December 1981

2009 remaster bonus tracks
No.	Title	Length
9.	"20,000 Ft." (BBC session)	3:17
10.	"Dallas 1 PM" (BBC session)	6:01
11.	"The Eagle Has Landed" (BBC session)	7:32
12.	"747 (Strangers in the Night)" (BBC session)	4:41
13.	"To Hell and Back Again" (alternate version)	4:47
14.	"20,000 Ft." (Abbey Road mix 2009)	4:10
15.	"Mandy" (early version of Sixth Form Girls)	3:58
16.	"Heavy Metal Thunder" (Abbey Road mix 2009)	4:15

Tracks 9 to 12 recorded live at Studio B15 on 25 April 1982.

== Personnel ==
Saxon

- Biff Byford – lead vocals
- Graham Oliver – guitars
- Paul Quinn – guitars
- Steve Dawson – bass guitar
- Pete Gill – drums

Production

- Pete Hinton – producer
- Will Reid Dick – engineer
- Saxon – arrangements
- Blechner Poxon – management

== Charts ==
Chart (1980-81)	Peak position
French Albums (SNEP)	15
Swedish Albums (Sverigetopplistan)	37
UK Albums (Official Charts)	11

Chart (2018)	Peak position
UK Rock & Metal Albums (Official Charts)	25

== Certifications ==
Region	Certification	Certified units/sales
United Kingdom (BPI)	Gold	100,000^{^}
^{^} Shipments figures based on certification alone.
