= Wheels of Steel =

Studio album by Saxon
- Released: 3 April 1980
- Recorded: February 1980
- Studio: Ramport (London)
- Genre: Heavy metal
- Length: 38:56
- Label: Carrere
- Producers: Pete Hinton, Saxon

Saxon chronology
Saxon (1979)	Wheels of Steel (1980)	Strong Arm of the Law (1980)

Singles from Wheels of Steel
- 1. "Wheels of Steel" Released: 14 March 1980; 2. "747 (Strangers in the Night)" Released: June 1980; 3. "Suzie Hold On" Released: September 1980

Wheels of Steel is the second studio album by English heavy metal band Saxon. Released in 1980 by Carrere Records, it was their first album to enter the UK Albums Chart, peaking at number 5, and is their highest-charting album in the UK Albums Chart to date. The album eventually went on to achieve gold status in the UK.

== Song notes ==
"747 (Strangers in the Night)" is about a power cut that forced planes in New York to remain in ascent in 1965 with the power outage provoking a Scandinavian flight to detour to Kennedy airport in the dark. (The aircraft involved was not actually a Boeing 747, which wasn't introduced until five years later.)

The title track is featured in the video games Grand Theft Auto: Episodes from Liberty City (Grand Theft Auto: The Lost and Damned and Grand Theft Auto: The Ballad of Gay Tony) and Brütal Legend. It has also been covered by L.A. Guns on their album Rips the Covers Off and bears a strong resemblance to the outro riff of "Rock 'n' Roll Doctor" by Black Sabbath, although according to guitarist Graham Oliver the song was actually inspired by the Ted Nugent song "Cat Scratch Fever".

== Reception ==
Professional ratings
Review scores
Source	Rating
AllMusic	4.5/5 stars
Collector's Guide to Heavy Metal	8/10
Sputnikmusic	3.5/5 stars

The album received very positive reviews from critics and is today regarded as a classic, genre-defining metal album. Eduardo Rivadavia of AllMusic lists the album as "topping the heap of essential Saxon albums, pretty much hand in hand with its immediate successors, Strong Arm of the Law and Denim and Leather, effectively setting the template for the band's most successful efforts." Canadian reviewer Martin Popoff regards Wheels of Steel as a "qualified classic" and "one of really two or three of (NWOBHM's) building blocks;" it is "a record on a mission, willing to take responsibility as a spokesvinyl for legions of English punters with a thirst for regular metal guys". Sputnikmusic's Mike Stagno praises "the solid, consistent rhythms that produce the riffy, yet accessible tunes" and Biff Byford's "powerful singing", which make Wheels of Steel "perhaps not one of metal's best albums," but "still a very worthwhile album."

== Track listing ==
All tracks are written by Biff Byford, Paul Quinn, Graham Oliver, Steve Dawson and Pete Gill.

Side one
No.	Title	Length
1.	"Motorcycle Man"	3:56
2.	"Stand Up and Be Counted"	3:09
3.	"747 (Strangers in the Night)"	4:58
4.	"Wheels of Steel"	5:58

Side two
No.	Title	Length
5.	"Freeway Mad"	2:41
6.	"See the Light Shining"	4:55
7.	"Street Fighting Gang"	3:12
8.	"Suzie Hold On"	4:34
9.	"Machine Gun"	5:23

1997 remaster bonus tracks, Saxon – Wheels of Steel / Strong Arm of the Law, 2 x CD, Reissue, Remastered, Compilation, UK & Europe: recorded live at Hammersmith Odeon December 1981 tr. 12 – 14
No.	Title	Length
10.	"Judgement Day" (live)	5:38
11.	"Wheels of Steel" (7" version)	4:30
12.	"See the Light Shining" (live)	5:31
13.	"Wheels of Steel" (live)	9:27
14.	"747 (Strangers in the Night)" (live)	4:56
15.	"Stallions of the Highway" (live (Saxon – 747 (Strangers in the Night), 12 inch, 45rpm, lim.ed; spec.ed;, B1, B2 – See The Light Shining, UK, 1980)	3:18

2009 remaster bonus tracks
No.	Title	Length
10.	"Suzie Hold On" (1980 demo rehearsal)	5:26
11.	"Wheels of Steel" (1980 demo rehearsal)	6:31
12.	"Stallions of the Highway" (live, b-side "747 (Strangers in the Night)")	3:35
13.	"Motorcycle Man" (live)	3:37
14.	"Freeway Mad" (live)	2:24
15.	"Wheels of Steel" (live)	5:26
16.	"747 (Strangers in the Night)" (live)	4:47
17.	"Machine Gun" (live)	6:16

- 2009 remaster bonus tracks 13–17 recorded Live at the Monsters of Rock Festival Castle Donington 16 August 1980
- 'See The Light Shining' dedicated to Fast Eddie.

== Personnel ==
=== Saxon ===
- Biff Byford – lead vocals, percussion
- Graham Oliver – guitars
- Paul Quinn – guitars
- Steve Dawson – bass guitar
- Pete Gill – drums, percussion

=== Production ===
- Saxon – production
- Pete Hinton – production
- Will Reid Dick – engineering

== Charts ==
Chart (1980)	Peak position
Swedish Albums (Sverigetopplistan)	36
UK Albums (Official Charts)	5
Chart (2018)	Peak position
UK Independent Albums (Official Charts)	38
Chart (2025)	Peak position
UK Rock & Metal Albums (Official Charts)	15

== Certifications ==
Region	Certification	Certified units/sales
United Kingdom (BPI)	Gold	100,000^{^}
^{^} Shipments figures based on certification alone.
