= Palace Theatre, Redditch =

Grade II listed theatre in Redditch in Worcestershire, England

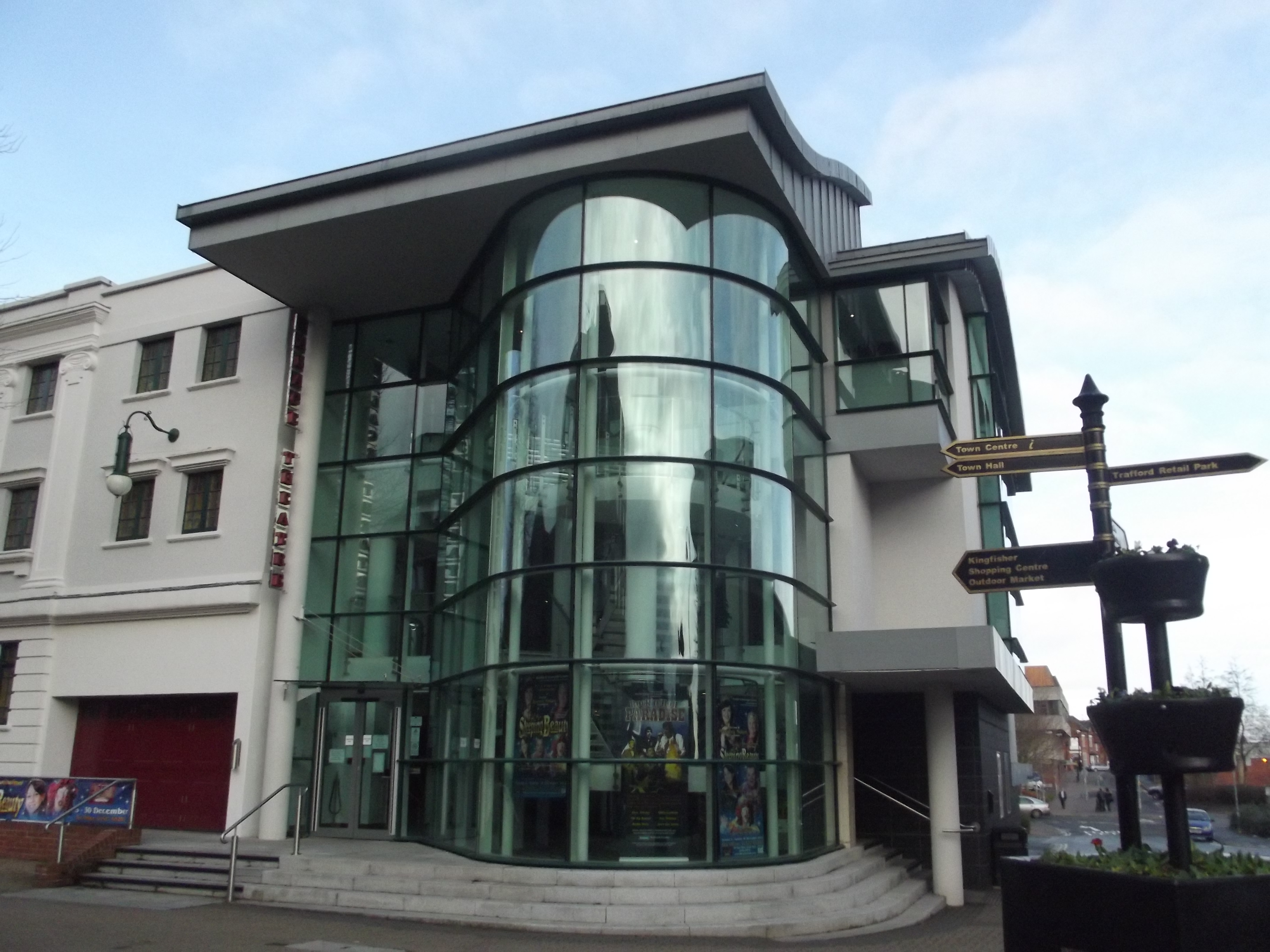
- Palace Theatre in 2013, showing the 1971 foyer extension
- Interactive map of Palace Theatre, Redditch
- Address: Alcester Street; Redditch; England
- Coordinates: 52.3055°N 1.9379°W
- Owner: Redditch Borough Council
- Capacity: 420

Construction
- Opened: 1913
- Rebuilt: 2005
- Architect: William Robert (Bertie) Crewe

Website
- redditchpalacetheatre.co.uk

Listed Building – Grade II
- Official name: Palace Theatre
- Designated: 8 September 1996
- Reference no.: 1268300

The Palace Theatre is a Grade II listed theatre in Redditch in Worcestershire, England. It opened in 1913 and has been primarily used as a theatre, but also as a cinema, rollerskating rink and bingo hall.

== History ==
The theatre opened in 1913, with a capacity of 660. It was designed by Bertie Crewe with a Neo-classical interior. The theatre was split into a circular balcony with stalls above.

In 1939, the theatre closed at the onset of World War II, but quickly re-opened. It closed in 1954 and was redeveloped as a rollerskating rink, opening the following year. It was used as a dance hall from 1959, and subsequently as a bingo hall. The premises were acquired by Redditch Urban District Council in 1967. The building was later modified.

The premises re-opened exclusively as a theatre on 11 September 1971 by the Secretary of State for the Environment, Peter Walker. An extension on the south east side housing a new foyer opened the same year, while a former factory at the back of the theatre was converted into a set of dressing rooms in 1976.

Since 1985, the building has been run by Redditch Borough Council. It was Grade II listed in 1996. In 2005, the theatre was restored to its original state. Funds and grants were provided by Redditch Borough Council (£3M), and £920,500 as part of a £4 million scheme from The Heritage Lottery Fund (HLF). The theatre's original seats have been retained and reupholstered.

== Performances ==
The Palace building was initially used for a variety of uses, including theatre and cinema. In 1930, it became known as the Palace Super Cinema. After re-opened in 1940, focusing again on a mix of cinema and variety. Since 1971, it has been used exclusively as a theatre.

The theatre hosts a programme of touring comedy, drama, plays, and an annual pantomime and since 1971 has been the home base of the Redditch Operatic Society.
