= Pete Gill =

English drummer

- Born: Peter Gill; 9 June 1951 (age 75)
- Origin: Sheffield, England
- Genres: Heavy metal
- Occupation: Musician
- Instrument: Drums
- Years active: 1970–1996

Peter Gill (born 9 June 1951) is an English former heavy metal drummer, formerly a member of the Glitter Band, Saxon and Motörhead.

Gill was one of the two drummers in the Glitter Band, then formed part of the original line-up of Saxon in 1978. He stayed with them until 1981, playing on their first four albums, leaving the band after he injured his hand. Gill was in Motörhead from 1984 to 1987. During that time his recordings with the group were the four new tracks of the compilation No Remorse; the live video The Birthday Party; and one full album, Orgasmatron. The band also toured extensively during the time Gill was a member. After years of absence, he reunited with his former Saxon colleagues in a new band, named Son of a Bitch, with bassist Steve Dawson and guitarist Graham Oliver. Gill stayed briefly in the band, recording only one album, titled Victim You, in 1996.

Gill detoxed in 2004 after having a problem with alcohol for two years. He is no longer able to play drums, due to severe arthritis which he has claimed had "spread to my hands and my legs and my back".

== Discography ==
=== Saxon ===
- (1979) Saxon
- (1980) Wheels of Steel
- (1980) Strong Arm of the Law
- (1981) Denim and Leather

=== Motörhead ===
- (1984) No Remorse
- (1985) The Birthday Party
- (1986) Orgasmatron

=== Son of a Bitch ===
- (1996) Victim You

=== Video and DVDs ===
- (1986) The Birthday Party VHS video, 60 minutes.
