= 1987 in film =

The following is an overview of events in 1987 in film, including the highest-grossing films, award ceremonies and festivals, a list of films released and notable deaths. Paramount Pictures celebrated its 75th anniversary in 1987.

== Highest-grossing films (U.S.) ==
The top ten 1987 released films by box office gross in North America are as follows:

Highest-grossing films of 1987
| Rank | Title | Distributor | Box-office gross |
|---|---|---|---|
| 1 | Three Men and a Baby | Buena Vista | $167,780,960 |
| 2 | Fatal Attraction | Paramount | $156,645,693 |
| 3 | Beverly Hills Cop II | Paramount | $153,665,036 |
| 4 | Good Morning, Vietnam | Buena Vista | $123,922,370 |
| 5 | Moonstruck | MGM | $80,640,528 |
| 6 | The Untouchables | Paramount | $76,270,454 |
| 7 | The Secret of My Success | Universal | $66,995,000 |
| 8 | Stakeout | Buena Vista | $65,673,233 |
| 9 | Lethal Weapon | Warner Bros. | $65,207,127 |
| 10 | The Witches of Eastwick | Warner Bros. | $63,766,510 |

== Events ==
- January 31 – The Cure for Insomnia premieres at The School of the Art Institute in Chicago, Illinois, to officially become the world's longest film according to Guinness World Records.
- February 22 - Blue Sky Studios is founded by Chris Wedge.
- May 23 – {Starlog Salutes STAR WARS} is held in Los Angeles, California, the first officially sponsored Star Wars convention to commemorate the franchise's 10th anniversary.
- June 29 – The James Bond franchise celebrates its 25th anniversary and premieres its 15th film, The Living Daylights.
- July 17 – Walt Disney's classic masterpiece Snow White and the Seven Dwarfs is re-released worldwide for its 50th anniversary.
- December 11 – Ben Stiller's film debut (Empire of the Sun).
- 1987 – Paramount Pictures launches a new on-screen logo to celebrate the company's 75th anniversary, a variant used until 1989, and the standard variant of this logo was used from 1989 to 2002.

== Awards ==
| Category/Organization | 45th Golden Globe Awards January 23, 1988 | | 41st BAFTA Awards March 19, 1988 | 60th Academy Awards April 11, 1988 |
| Category/Organization | Drama | Musical or Comedy | 41st BAFTA Awards March 19, 1988 | 60th Academy Awards April 11, 1988 |
|---|---|---|---|---|
| Best Film | The Last Emperor | Hope and Glory | Jean de Florette | The Last Emperor |
| Best Director | Bernardo Bertolucci; The Last Emperor | | Oliver Stone; Platoon | Bernardo Bertolucci; The Last Emperor |
| Best Actor | Michael Douglas; Wall Street | Robin Williams; Good Morning, Vietnam | Sean Connery; The Name of the Rose | Michael Douglas; Wall Street |
| Best Actress | Sally Kirkland; Anna | Cher; Moonstruck | Anne Bancroft; 84 Charing Cross Road | Cher; Moonstruck |
| Best Supporting Actor | Sean Connery; The Untouchables | | Daniel Auteuil; Jean de Florette | Sean Connery; The Untouchables |
| Best Supporting Actress | Olympia Dukakis; Moonstruck | | Susan Wooldridge; Hope and Glory | Olympia Dukakis; Moonstruck |
| Best Screenplay, Adapted | Bernardo Bertolucci ,Mark Peploe and Enzo Ungari; The Last Emperor | | Claude Berri and Gerard Brach; Jean de Florette | Bernardo Bertolucci ,Mark Peploe and Enzo Ungari; The Last Emperor |
| Best Screenplay, Original | Bernardo Bertolucci ,Mark Peploe and Enzo Ungari; The Last Emperor | | Brian Leland; Wish You Were Here | John Patrick Shanley; Moonstruck |
| Best Original Score | Ryuichi Sakamoto, David Byrne and Cong Su; The Last Emperor | | Ennio Morricone; The Untouchables | Ryuichi Sakamoto, David Byrne and Cong Su; The Last Emperor |
| Best Original Song | "(I've Had) The Time of My Life"; Dirty Dancing | | N/A | "(I've Had) The Time of My Life"; Dirty Dancing |
| Best Foreign Language Film | My Life as a Dog | | The Sacrifice | Babette's Feast |

Academy Awards:

Best Picture: The Last Emperor - Hemdale, Columbia
Best Director: Bernardo Bertolucci - The Last Emperor
Best Actor: Michael Douglas - Wall Street
Best Actress: Cher - Moonstruck
Best Supporting Actor: Sean Connery - The Untouchables
Best Supporting Actress: Olympia Dukakis - Moonstruck
Best Foreign Language Film: Babette's Feast (Babettes Gæstebud), directed by Gabriel Axel, Denmark

Golden Globe Awards:

Drama:
Best Picture: The Last Emperor
Best Actor: Michael Douglas – Wall Street
Best Actress: Sally Kirkland – Anna

Musical or comedy:
Best Picture: Hope and Glory
Best Actor: Robin Williams – Good Morning, Vietnam
Best Actress: Cher – Moonstruck

Other
Best Director: Bernardo Bertolucci – The Last Emperor
Best Foreign Language Film: My Life as a Dog, Sweden

Palme d'Or (Cannes Film Festival):

Under the Sun of Satan (Sous le soleil de Satan), directed by Maurice Pialat, France

Golden Lion (Venice Film Festival):

Au revoir les enfants (Goodbye, Children), directed by Louis Malle, France / W. Germany

Golden Bear (Berlin Film Festival):

Tema (1979) (The Theme), directed by Gleb Panfilov, USSR

People's Choice Award (Toronto International Film Festival):

The Princess Bride, directed by Rob Reiner, United States

== 1987 films ==
=== By country/region ===
- List of American films of 1987
- List of Argentine films of 1987
- List of Australian films of 1987
- List of Bangladeshi films of 1987
- List of British films of 1987
- List of Canadian films of 1987
- List of French films of 1987
- List of Hong Kong films of 1987
- List of Indian films of 1987
  - List of Hindi films of 1987
  - List of Kannada films of 1987
  - List of Malayalam films of 1987
  - List of Marathi films of 1987
  - List of Tamil films of 1987
  - List of Telugu films of 1987
- List of Japanese films of 1987
- List of Mexican films of 1987
- List of Pakistani films of 1987
- List of South Korean films of 1987
- List of Soviet films of 1987
- List of Spanish films of 1987

=== By genre/medium ===
- List of action films of 1987
- List of animated feature films of 1987
- List of avant-garde films of 1987
- List of comedy films of 1987
- List of drama films of 1987
- List of horror films of 1987
- List of science fiction films of 1987
- List of thriller films of 1987
- List of western films of 1987

== Births ==
- January 1 – Gia Coppola, American director and screenwriter
- January 2 – Shelley Hennig, American actress and model
- January 5
  - Fabiola Guajardo, Mexican actress and model
  - Jason Mitchell, American actor
- January 7 – Lyndsy Fonseca, American actress
- January 8
  - Cynthia Erivo, British actress
  - Freddie Stroma, British actor and model
- January 9 - Nicola Coughlan, Irish actress
- January 12 – Naya Rivera, American actress, singer, and model (died 2020)
- January 13 – Max Van Ville, American DJ, producer, and actor
- January 16
  - Carrie Keranen, voice actress, production manager, producer, and voice director
  - Angel Karamoy, Indonesian actress, singer and comedian
- January 18
  - Ingvild Deila, Norwegian actress
  - Zane Holtz, Canadian actor and model
- January 20 – Evan Peters, American actor and producer
- January 22 - Eileen O'Higgins, Irish actress
- January 30 - Valene Kane, Northern Irish actress
- January 31 - Victor Ortiz, American professional boxer and actor
- February 1
  - Heather Morris, American actress, dancer, singer, and model
  - Ronda Rousey, American professional wrestler and actress
- February 4 – Lewis Tan, English actor and martial artist
- February 5
  - Adassa, American singer-songwriter and voice actress
  - Darren Criss, American actor, singer, and songwriter
  - Henry Golding, Malaysian-British actor and television host
  - Raymond Lee, American actor
- February 6 - Natalia Reyes, Colombian actress
- February 7 – Doua Moua, American actor
- February 9
  - Michael B. Jordan, American actor and film producer
  - Rose Leslie, Scottish actress
- February 11 – Julio Torres, Salvadoran writer, comedian, and actor
- February 17 – Ísis Valverde, Brazilian actress
- February 20
  - Cortney Palm, American actress
  - Daniella Pineda, American actress
  - Miles Teller, American actor
  - Jay Hayden, American actor
- February 21
  - Ashley Greene, American actress
  - Tuppence Middleton, British actress
  - Elliot Page, Canadian actor
- February 24 - Tina Desai, Indian actress
- February 28 – Michelle Horn, American actress
- March 4 – Tamzin Merchant, English actress and author
- March 8
  - Tobe Nwigwe, American rapper, singer and actor
  - Milana Vayntrub, American actress and comedian
- March 9 - Bow Wow, American rapper and actor
- March 10 – Ser'Darius Blain, Haitian-American actor
- March 17 - Alison Rich, American actress, writer and director
- March 19 - Josie Loren, American former actress
- March 20 – Rollo Weeks, British former actor
- March 24 - María Valverde, Spanish actress
- March 22 – Billy Kametz, American voice actor (died 2022)
- March 26 – Josh Herdman, English actor and mixed martial artist
- March 28 – Jimmy Wong, American actor and musician
- April 1 – Mackenzie Davis, Canadian actress, producer and model
- April 3 – Rachel Bloom, American actress, comedian, writer, singer-songwriter, and producer
- April 4 – Sarah Gadon, actress
- April 6 - Jerrod Carmichael, American stand-up comedian, actor, writer and filmmaker
- April 7 - Richard Pyros, British-Australian actor
- April 9 – Jesse McCartney, actor, singer-songwriter and voice actor
- April 10 – Shay Mitchell, Canadian actress and model
- April 12
  - Brooklyn Decker, American actress and model
  - Ilana Glazer, American stand-up comedian, actress, writer, producer and director
- April 16 - Jack Cutmore-Scott, English actor
- April 18 - Rosie Huntington-Whiteley, British actress and model
- April 19
  - Oksana Akinshina, Russian actress
  - Courtland Mead, American actor
- April 20 – John Patrick Amedori, American actor and musician
- April 21 - Meng'er Zhang, Chinese actress
- April 27
  - William Moseley, English actor
  - Lachlan Buchanan. Australian Actor
- April 28 – Tonia Sotiropoulou, Greek actress
- May 2 - Mae Martin, Canadian comedian, actor and screenwriter
- May 5 – Jessie Cave, English actress and comedian
- May 7 - Maya Erskine, American actress
- May 8 – Aneurin Barnard, Welsh actor
- May 13 – Hunter Parrish, American actor and singer
- May 17 - Jayne Wisener, Northern Irish actress and singer
- May 20
  - Ray Chase, American voice actor
  - Fra Fee, Northern Irish actor and singer
- May 27 – Bella Heathcote, Australian actress and model
- May 28 – Jessica Rothe, American actress
- May 31 – Meredith Hagner, American actress
- June 3
  - Olivia Hamilton, American actress and producer
  - Lalaine, American actress and singer-songwriter
- June 6 – Daniel Logan, New Zealand-born American actor
- June 11 – Jimmy O. Yang, Hong Kong-American actor, stand-up comedian and writer
- June 12 - Abbey Lee, Australian actress and musician
- June 17 - Sarah Niles, English actress
- June 18 - Niels Schneider, French-Canadian actor
- June 19 - Beattie Edmondson, English actress
- June 22 – Joe Dempsie, English actor
- June 23 - Edward Holcroft, English actor
- June 25
  - Scott Terra, American former actor
  - Mary Tsoni, Greek actress and singer (d. 2017)
- June 26 – Valerie Pachner, Austrian actress
- June 27 – Ed Westwick, English film and television actor
- July 3 - Chad Broskey, American actor
- July 6 – Matt O'Leary, American actor
- July 7 – Julianna Guill, American actress
- July 11 – Cristina Vee, American voice actress
- July 15 – Jimmy Rees, Australian comedian
- July 23 - Araya Mengesha, Canadian actor
- July 25 – Michael Welch, American actor
- July 26
  - Miriam McDonald, Canadian actress
  - Hallie Meyers-Shyer, American actress and filmmaker
- July 27 – Mara Wilson, actress and writer
- July 29 – Genesis Rodriguez, American actress and model
- July 31 – Brittany Byrnes, Australian actress
- August 2 - Hannah Hoekstra, Dutch actress
- August 8
  - Mădălina Diana Ghenea, Romanian actress
  - Katie Leung, Scottish film, television, and stage actress
  - Jenn Proske, Canadian-American actress
- August 18
  - Mika Boorem, American actress and filmmaker
  - Óscar Catacora, Peruvian director, screenwriter and cinematographer (died 2021)
- August 19 – Manny Jacinto, Canadian actor
- August 20 - Alexandra Roach, Welsh actress
- August 21 – Cody Kasch, American actor
- August 25
  - Stacey Farber, Canadian actress
  - Blake Lively, American actress, model, and director
  - Chloe Pirrie, Scottish actress
  - Liu Yifei, Chinese-American actress, singer, and model
- August 30
  - Johanna Braddy, American actress
  - Cameron Finley, American former child actor
- September 7 – Evan Rachel Wood, American actress, model, and musician
- September 8
  - Ray Fisher, American actor
  - Wiz Khalifa, American Rapper
  - Domee Shi, Chinese-Canadian animator, storyboard artist and director
- September 9 - Clayton Snyder, American actor
- September 10 - Tunji Kasim, Scottish actor
- September 11
  - Tyler Hoechlin, American actor
  - Elizabeth Henstridge, English actress
- September 14
  - Jessica Brown Findlay, English actress
  - Anna Chazelle, American actress, writer and director
- September 15 - Christian Cooke, English actor
- September 17 – Augustus Prew, English actor
- September 19 – Danielle Panabaker, American actress
- September 20 – Sarah Natochenny, American voice actress
- September 21 – Ryan Guzman, American actor
- September 22
  - Tom Felton, English actor
  - Teyonah Parris, American actress
- September 23 – Skylar Astin, American actor and singer
- September 24
  - Spencer Treat Clark, American actor
  - Grey Damon, American actor
- September 28 – Hilary Duff, actress, singer, songwriter, and businesswoman
- September 29
  - David Del Rio, American actor, director and producer
  - Anaïs Demoustier, French actress
- September 30 - Mahaley Patel, American actress
- October 1 – Michaela Coel, British actress and screenwriter
- October 9 - Melissa Villaseñor, American stand-up comedian, actress, writer and musician
- October 10 - James Northcote, English actor and producer
- October 11 - Mike Conley Jr., American Basketball Player
- October 14 – Jay Pharoah, American actor and stand-up comedian
- October 16 – Zhao Liying, Chinese actress
- October 18 – Zac Efron, American actor and singer
- October 23 - Kirby Howell-Baptiste, English actress
- October 24 – Lincoln Lewis, Australian actor
- November 1
  - Zach Cherry, American actor and comedian
  - Jamie Demetriou, English comedian, actor and screenwriter
- November 5 – Kevin Jonas, American singer-songwriter and actor (Jonas Brothers)
- November 9 – Jennifer Holland, American actress
- November 10 - Andrew Koji, British actor and martial artist
  - DJ Augustin, American Basketball Player
- November 11
  - Melanie Liburd, British actress
  - Ludi Lin, Chinese-born Canadian actor and model
- November 12 – Kengo Kora, Japanese actor
- November 14 – Brian Gleeson, Irish actor
- November 18 – Jake Abel, American actor and singer
- November 23 – Vallo Kirs, Estonian actor
- November 24 – Renate Reinsve, Norwegian actress
- November 27 – Lashana Lynch, Jamaican-British actress
- November 28 – Karen Gillan, Scottish actress and filmmaker
- December 1 - Sarah Snook, Australian actress
- December 3 – Michael Angarano, American actor
- December 4 - Orlando Brown, American actor, rapper and singer
- December 6 - Idara Victor, American actress
- December 8 – Aria Curzon, American actress
- December 11 – Moe Dunford, Irish actor
- December 16 - Hallee Hirsh, American actress
- December 21 – Khris Davis, American actor
- December 23 - Agam Darshi, British actress
- December 25 - Eugenia Kuzmina, Russian actress and comedian
- December 28 – Adam Gregory, American actor
- December 29 - Joseph Lee, American actor

== Deaths ==
| Month | Date | Name | Age | Country | Profession | Notable films |
|---|---|---|---|---|---|---|
| January | 3 | David Maysles | 55 | US | Documentarian | Gimme Shelter; Grey Gardens |
| January | 9 | Arthur Lake | 81 | US | Actor | Blondie; Dance Hall |
| January | 14 | Douglas Sirk | 89 | Germany | Director | Imitation of Life; Written on the Wind |
| January | 15 | Ray Bolger | 83 | US | Actor, Singer | The Wizard of Oz; Babes in Toyland |
| January | 15 | George Markstein | 60 | UK | Screenwriter | Robbery; The Odessa File |
| January | 16 | Joyce Jameson | 54 | US | Actress | The Apartment; Death Race 2000 |
| January | 27 | Norman McLaren | 72 | UK | Animator, Director | Neighbours; Pas de deux |
| February | 1 | Alessandro Blasetti | 86 | Italy | Director, Screenwriter | 1860; The Countess of Parma |
| February | 22 | David Susskind | 66 | US | Producer | A Raisin in the Sun; Alice Doesn't Live Here Anymore |
| February | 23 | William Rose | 68 | US | Screenwriter | Guess Who's Coming to Dinner; The Ladykillers |
| February | 23 | Esmond Knight | 80 | UK | Actor | Henry V; The Red Shoes |
| February | 25 | James Coco | 56 | US | Actor | Only When I Laugh; Wholly Moses! |
| February | 25 | John Collin | 58 | UK | Actor | Tess; Star! |
| February | 28 | Joan Greenwood | 65 | UK | Actress | He Found a Star; The October Man |
| March | 2 | Randolph Scott | 89 | US | Actor | The Texans; The Walking Hills |
| March | 3 | Danny Kaye | 74 | US | Actor, Singer | White Christmas; The Court Jester |
| March | 7 | Henri Decaë | 71 | France | Cinematographer | The Boys from Brazil; The 400 Blows |
| March | 7 | Waldo Salt | 72 | US | Screenwriter | Midnight Cowboy; Serpico |
| March | 21 | Dean Paul Martin | 35 | US | Actor | Players; Heart Like a Wheel |
| March | 21 | Robert Preston | 68 | US | Actor | The Music Man; Victor Victoria |
| March | 22 | Morton Haack | 62 | US | Costume Designer | Planet of the Apes; The Unsinkable Molly Brown |
| March | 27 | William Bowers | 71 | US | Screenwriter | The Gunfighter; Support Your Local Sheriff |
| March | 28 | Patrick Troughton | 67 | UK | Actor | Jason and the Argonauts; Scars of Dracula |
| April | 6 | Philip M. Jefferies | 61 | US | Production Designer | Grease; An Officer and a Gentleman |
| April | 11 | Kent Taylor | 79 | US | Actor | Half Past Midnight; Payment on Demand |
| April | 17 | Dick Shawn | 63 | US | Actor | The Producers; It's a Mad, Mad, Mad, Mad World |
| April | 19 | Milt Kahl | 78 | US | Animator | The Jungle Book; One Hundred and One Dalmatians |
| May | 2 | Michael Gover | 73 | UK | Actor | A Clockwork Orange; Superman |
| May | 4 | Paul Groesse | 81 | US | Art Director | Little Women; In the Heat of the Night |
| May | 7 | Colin Blakely | 56 | Ireland | Actor | A Man for All Seasons; The Private Life of Sherlock Holmes |
| May | 14 | Rita Hayworth | 68 | US | Actress | Gilda; The Lady from Shanghai |
| May | 21 | Alejandro Rey | 57 | Argentina | Actor | Fun in Acapulco; Moscow on the Hudson |
| May | 24 | Hermione Gingold | 89 | UK | Actress | The Music Man; Gigi |
| May | 29 | Howard Shoup | 83 | US | Costume Designer | Cool Hand Luke; The Young Philadelphians |
| June | 1 | Khwaja Ahmad Abbas | 72 | India | Director, Screenwriter | Mera Naam Joker; Awaara |
| June | 3 | Will Sampson | 53 | US | Actor | One Flew Over the Cuckoo's Nest; The Outlaw Josey Wales |
| June | 6 | Fulton Mackay | 64 | UK | Actor | Local Hero; Gumshoe |
| June | 8 | Daniel Mandell | 91 | US | Film Editor | The Apartment; The Best Years of Our Lives |
| June | 10 | Elizabeth Hartman | 43 | US | Actress | A Patch of Blue; The Secret of NIMH |
| June | 11 | Dan Vadis | 49 | China | Actor | Every Which Way But Loose; High Plains Drifter |
| June | 13 | Geraldine Page | 62 | US | Actress | Sweet Bird of Youth; The Rescuers |
| June | 22 | Fred Astaire | 88 | US | Actor | Swing Time; The Towering Inferno |
| June | 24 | Jackie Gleason | 71 | US | Actor | The Hustler; Smokey and the Bandit |
| July | 1 | Jerry Livingston | 78 | US | Songwriter | Cinderella; Cat Ballou |
| July | 3 | Viola Dana | 90 | US | Actress | That Certain Thing; The Show of Shows |
| July | 5 | Phil Abramson | 54 | US | Set Decorator | Close Encounters of the Third Kind; Bullitt |
| July | 7 | Hannelore Schroth | 65 | Germany | Actress | Sweetheart of the Gods; Beloved Corinna |
| July | 12 | Harold Goodwin | 84 | US | Actor | All Quiet on the Western Front; The Wyoming Bandit |
| July | 15 | Alfie Bass | 71 | UK | Actor | The Fearless Vampire Killers; Moonraker |
| July | 17 | Yūjirō Ishihara | 52 | Japan | Actor, Singer | Season of the Sun; Crazed Fruit |
| July | 20 | Richard Egan | 65 | US | Actor | The 300 Spartans; A Summer Place |
| July | 22 | Adele Comandini | 89 | US | Screenwriter | Three Smart Girls; Christmas in Connecticut |
| July | 31 | Joseph E. Levine | 81 | US | Producer | A Bridge Too Far; The Lion in Winter |
| August | 1 | Pola Negri | 90 | Poland | Actress | Madame Dubarry; Carmen |
| August | 17 | Clarence Brown | 97 | US | Director | National Velvet; The Yearling |
| August | 17 | Shaike Ophir | 58 | Israel | Actor | The Policeman; Blaumilch Canal |
| August | 19 | Hayden Rorke | 76 | US | Actor | Pillow Talk; The Barefoot Executive |
| August | 21 | Bombolo | 56 | Italy | Actor | Squadra antitruffa; Little Italy |
| August | 22 | Ted Sherdeman | 78 | US | Screenwriter | Them!; A Dog of Flanders |
| August | 28 | John Huston | 81 | US | Actor, Director, Screenwriter | The Maltese Falcon; The Treasure of the Sierra Madre |
| August | 29 | Lee Marvin | 63 | US | Actor | The Dirty Dozen; The Man Who Shot Liberty Valance |
| September | 1 | Philip Friend | 72 | UK | Actor | Buccaneer's Girl; The Son of Robin Hood |
| September | 4 | Richard Marquand | 49 | UK | Director | Return of the Jedi; Jagged Edge |
| September | 5 | Bill Fraser | 79 | UK | Actor | Up Pompeii; Up the Chastity Belt |
| September | 11 | Lorne Greene | 72 | Canada | Actor | Earthquake; The Buccaneer |
| September | 12 | John Qualen | 87 | US | Actor | His Girl Friday; The Grapes of Wrath |
| September | 13 | Mervyn LeRoy | 86 | US | Director | Quo Vadis; Mister Roberts |
| September | 23 | Bob Fosse | 60 | US | Director, Screenwriter | Cabaret; All That Jazz |
| September | 23 | Erland Van Lidth De Jeude | 34 | Netherlands | Actor | The Running Man; Stir Crazy |
| September | 25 | Mary Astor | 81 | US | Actress | The Maltese Falcon; Meet Me in St. Louis |
| September | 25 | Emlyn Williams | 81 | UK | Actor, Screenwriter | The Man Who Knew Too Much; The Citadel |
| October | 2 | Madeleine Carroll | 81 | UK | Actress | The 39 Steps; Secret Agent |
| October | 21 | Bob Simmons | 64 | UK | Stuntman | James Bond; A Touch of Class |
| October | 22 | Lino Ventura | 68 | Italy | Actor | Illustrious Corpses; The Dictator's Guns |
| November | 4 | Danielle Gaubert | 44 | France | Actress | Flight from Ashiya; Camille 2000 |
| November | 5 | Georges Franju | 75 | France | Director, Screenwriter | Judex; Nuits Rouges |
| November | 11 | John 'Dusty' King | 78 | US | Actor, Singer | The Range Busters; Law of the Jungle |
| November | 23 | Marcia Henderson | 58 | US | Actress | All I Desire; Back to God's Country |
| November | 26 | Morton Lowry | 73 | UK | Actor | How Green Was My Valley; The Hound of the Baskervilles |
| November | 29 | Irene Handl | 85 | UK | Actress | The Italian Job; I'm All Right Jack |
| December | 4 | Rouben Mamoulian | 90 | Georgia | Director | Dr. Jekyll and Mr. Hyde; The Mark of Zorro |
| December | 8 | Fay Baker | 70 | US | Actress | Notorious; She Devil |
| December | 14 | Clinton Sundberg | 84 | US | Actor | Annie Get Your Gun; Easter Parade |
| December | 21 | Robert Paige | 76 | US | Actor | Son of Dracula; Bye Bye Birdie |
| December | 21 | Ralph Nelson | 71 | US | Director | Charly; Lilies of the Field |

== Film debuts ==
- Patricia Arquette – A Nightmare on Elm Street 3: Dream Warriors
- Obba Babatundé – Leonard Part 6
- Dylan Baker – Ishtar
- Alec Baldwin – Forever, Lulu
- Christian Bale – Mio in the Land of Faraway
- Jason Bateman – Teen Wolf Too
- Paul Ben-Victor – Pass the Ammo
- Gil Birmingham – House II: The Second Story
- David Bowe – Back to the Beach
- Doug Bradley – Hellraiser
- Sandra Bullock – Hangmen
- Vanessa Bell Calloway – Number One with a Bullet
- Patricia Clarkson – The Untouchables
- Robert Clohessy – The Believers
- George Clooney – Return to Horror High
- Chris Cooper – Matewan
- John Corbett – Someone to Watch Over Me
- Courteney Cox – Down Twisted
- Bryan Cranston – Amazon Women on the Moon
- Raymond Cruz – Maid to Order
- Jim Cummings – The Garbage Pail Kids Movie
- Stacey Dash – Enemy Territory
- Rossy de Palma – Law of Desire
- Stephen Dorff – The Gate
- Illeana Douglas – Hello Again
- Edie Falco – Sweet Lorraine
- Bill Farmer – RoboCop
- Sean Patrick Flanery – A Tiger's Tale
- Thierry Frémont – Travelling avant
- Kurt Fuller – The Running Man
- James Gandolfini – Shock! Shock! Shock!
- Aidan Gillen – The Lonely Passion of Judith Hearne
- Gong Li – Red Sorghum
- Beth Grant – Under Cover
- Richard E. Grant – Withnail and I
- Zach Grenier – Radio Days
- Peter Haber – Nionde kompaniet
- Don Harvey – Creepshow 2
- David Hewlett – The Darkside
- Peter Jackson (director) – Bad Taste
- Thomas Jane – Padamati Sandhya Ragam
- Cherry Jones – Light of Day
- Doug Jones – The Newlydeads
- Nathan Lane – Ironweed
- Anthony LaPaglia – Cold Steel
- Robert LaSardo – China Girl
- Jason Scott Lee – Born in East L.A.
- Steven Mackintosh – Prick Up Your Ears
- Eddie Marsan – Empire State
- Holt McCallany – Creepshow 2
- Dylan McDermott – Hamburger Hill
- Paul McGann – Withnail and I
- Jacqueline McKenzie – Wordplay
- William McNamara – Opera
- Colm Meaney – The Dead
- Lance E. Nichols – Project X
- David Pasquesi – Light of Day
- Robert Patrick – Equalizer 2000
- Mark Pellegrino – Fatal Beauty
- Sean Pertwee – Prick Up Your Ears
- Robert Peters – Pass the Ammo
- Brad Pitt – No Man's Land
- Glenn Plummer – Who's That Girl
- John Pyper-Ferguson – Hello Mary Lou: Prom Night II
- Tara Reid – A Return to Salem's Lot
- Julian Richings – Love at Stake
- Campbell Scott – Five Corners
- Joan Severance – Lethal Weapon
- Robin Shou - The Big Brother
- Victor Slezak – Five Corners
- David Spade – Police Academy 4: Citizens on Patrol
- Ben Stiller – Hot Pursuit
- Don Swayze – Shy People
- Lee Tergesen – Mind Benders
- David Thewlis – Little Dorrit
- Uma Thurman – Kiss Daddy Goodnight
- Nancy Travis – Three Men and a Baby
- Richard Tyson – Three O'Clock High
- Courtney B. Vance – Hamburger Hill
- Pruitt Taylor Vince – Angel Heart
- Patrick Warburton – Dragonard
- Frank Whaley – Ironweed
- Luis Zahera – Divinas palabras
