= Sacrifice (disambiguation) =

A sacrifice is the practice of offering food, or the lives of animals or people to the gods, as an act of propitiation or worship.

Sacrifice may also refer to:

== Art ==
- Sacrifice (painting), 2013, by Robert B. Sherman

== Film ==
- The Sacrifice (1909 film), a silent film
- Sacrifice (1917 film), an American drama directed by Frank Reicher
- The Sacrifice (1918 film), a German silent drama
- The Sacrifice (1979 film), a Turkish drama
- The Sacrifice (1986 film), directed by Andrei Tarkovsky
- Sacrifice (2000 film), a TV movie directed by Mark L. Lester
- The Sacrifice (2005 film), an independent film
- Sacrifice (2010 film), a Chinese historical drama directed by Chen Kaige
- Sacrifice (2011 film), an American/Canadian thriller
- Sacrifice (2014 film), an American thriller
- Sacrifice (2016 film), an American thriller
- Jodi Ekdin (2019 film), a Bangladeshi film known as The Sacrifice in English
- The Sacrifice (2020 film), a Chinese war film
- Sacrifice (2020 film), a British horror film
- A Sacrifice, a 2024 thriller
- Sacrifice (2025 film), an action-comedy film
- The Sacrifice (upcoming film), an American-Philippine horror film directed by Prime Cruz

== Games ==
- Sacrifice (bridge), a strategy in bridge
- Sacrifice (chess), a chess tactic
- Shogi tactics#Piece sacrifice, the analogue in shogi
- Sacrifice (video game), a 2000 3D real-time strategy game

== Literature ==
- The Sacrifice, a 1956 novel by Adele Wiseman
- Sacrifice, a 1985 thriller novel by Graham Masterton
- Sacrifice, a 1991 novel by Andrew Vachss
- The Sacrifice (The Fey), a 1995 novel by Kristine Kathryn Rusch
- The Sacrifice (Applegate novel), a 2001 book in the Animorphs series
- Sacrifice, a 2007 novel in the Legacy of the Force series
- Left 4 Dead: The Sacrifice, a 2010 graphic novel
- The Sacrifice (Higson novel), a 2011 young adult horror novel by Charlie Higson
- Sacrifice, a 2012 fantasy novel by Cayla Kluver and the final book in the Legacy series
- The Sacrifice (Oates novel), 2015, by Joyce Carol Oates

== Music ==
=== Albums ===
- Sacrifice (Black Widow album), 1970
- Sacrifice (Divination album), 1998 album by American composer Bill Laswell
- Sacrifice (For Love), 1991 release by Greg Sage
- Sacrifice (Gary Numan album), 1994
- Sacrifice (Motörhead album), 1995
- Sacrifice (Saxon album), 2013
- Sacrifice (Sylver album), 2009
- Sacrifice (EP), 1996, by Danzig
- Sacrifice, 2011 EP by Versailles
- Sacrifices (album), 2018, by Guillermo Scott Heren under his alias Prefuse 73

=== Songs ===
- "Sacrifice" (Bebe Rexha song), 2021
- "Sacrifices" (Big Sean song), 2017
- "Sacrifices" (Dreamville, EarthGang and J. Cole song), 2019
- "Sacrifice" (Elton John song), 1989
- "Sacrifice" (Mariah the Scientist song), 2025
- "Sacrifice" (The Weeknd song), 2022
- "Sacrifice" (G.E.M. song), 2025
- "Sacrifice", a song by Attack Attack! from Attack Attack! II, 2025
- "Sacrifice", a song by Bathory from Bathory, 1984
- "Sacrifice", a song by Black Atlass from the soundtrack to the film Fifty Shades Freed, 2018
- "Sacrifice", a song by Converge from No Heroes, 2006
- "Sacrifice", a song by Danzing from Blackacidevil, 1996
- "Sacrifice", a song by The Devil Wears Prada from Color Decay, 2022
- "Sacrifice", a song by Devil You Know from The Beauty of Destruction, 2014
- "Sacrifice", a song by Edguy from Rocket Ride, 2006
- "Sacrifice", a song by In This Moment from Godmode, 2023
- "Sacrifice", a song by Melvins from Lysol, 1992
- "Sacrifice", a song by Tesseract from War of Being, 2023
- "Sacrifice", a song by Venom from Black Metal, 1982
- "Sacrifice", a song by Yngwie Malmsteen from Facing the Animal, 1997
- "The Sacrifice", a song by Cult of Luna from Cult of Luna, 2001
- "Sacrifices", a song by Drake from his mixtape More Life, 2017
- "Sacrificial", a song by Death from album Scream Bloody Gore, 1987

=== Other uses in music ===
- Sacrifice (band), a Canadian thrash metal band
- The Sacrifice (opera), 2007, by James MacMillan with a libretto by Michael Symmons Roberts

== Sports ==
- Sacrifice bunt, a related baseball maneuver
- Sacrifice fly, a baseball maneuver
- TNA Sacrifice, a professional wrestling pay-per-view event series

== Television ==
- "Sacrifice" (Angel), a 2003 episode of Angel
- "Sacrifice" (Arrow), a 2013 episode of Arrow
- "Sacrifice" (Battlestar Galactica), a 2006 episode of Battlestar Galactica
- "Sacrifice" (Blade: The Series), a 2006 episode of Blade: The Series
- Sacrifice (Derren Brown special), a 2018 special by Derren Brown
- "The Sacrifice" (Fear Itself), a 2008 episode of Fear Itself
- "Sacrifice" (The Following), a 2014 episode of the psychological thriller television series The Following
- "Sacrifice" (Revenge), a 2013 episode of television series Revenge
- "Sacrifice" (The Secret Circle), a 2012 episode of The Secret Circle
- "Sacrifices" (Stargate SG-1), a 2004 episode of Stargate SG-1
- "Sacrifice" (Star Wars: The Clone Wars)
- "Sacrifice" (Supernatural), a 2013 episode of the paranormal drama television series Supernatural
- "Sacrifice" (The Unit), a 2008 episode of The Unit
- "The Sacrifice" (The Vampire Diaries), a 2010 episode of The Vampire Diaries
- "Sacrifice" is Episode 25 of Freeform's 2018 mermaid show Siren
- "Sacrifice", an episode of The Good Doctor

== See also ==
- Sacrifice play (disambiguation)
