= Dancing with the Stars (Australian TV series) season 16 =

Season of the Australian television series

Dancing with the Stars
- Season 16
- Hosted by: Grant Denyer; Amanda Keller
- Judges: Sharna Burgess; Craig Revel Horwood; Tristan MacManus
- Celebrity winner: Samuel Johnson
- Professional winner: Jorja Freeman
- No. of episodes: 10

Release
- Original network: Network 10
- Original release: 18 February – 22 April 2019

Season chronology
- ← Previous; Season 15 Next → Season 17

The sixteenth season of the Australian Dancing with the Stars premiered on 18 February 2019. Due to Network 10 having obtained the rights for the series, an overhaul to the cast and crew occurred. Grant Denyer and Amanda Keller were announced as the new co-hosts, while Strictly Come Dancing judge Craig Revel Horwood and professional dancers Sharna Burgess and Tristan MacManus were announced as the judges.

== Couples ==
This season featured eleven celebrity contestants. Network 10 revealed the first three celebrities participating in Dancing With the Stars to be Samuel Johnson, Curtly Ambrose & Cassandra Thorburn on 23 January 2019. All of the remaining celebrities were announced on 30 January 2019.

Celebrity	Notability	Professional partner	Status	Ref.
Miguel Maestre	The Living Room presenter	Megan Wragg	Eliminated 1st on 25 February 2019	
Denise Scott	Studio 10 presenter & comedian	Jeremy Garner	Eliminated 2nd on 4 March 2019	
Cassandra Thorburn	Children's author & media personality	Marco De Angelis	Eliminated 3rd on 11 March 2019	
Olympia Valance	Neighbours actress & model	Jarryd Byrne	Eliminated 4th on 18 March 2019	
Michelle Bridges	The Biggest Loser trainer	Aric Yegudkin	Eliminated 5th on 25 March 2019	
Curtly Ambrose	West Indies cricketer	Siobhan Power	Eliminated 6th on 1 April 2019	
Jimmy Rees	Giggle and Hoot presenter	Alexandra Vladimirov	Withdrew on 8 April 2019	
Jett Kenny	Ironman contestant & model	Lily Cornish	Eliminated 7th on 15 April 2019	
Constance Hall	Author & blogger	Gustavo Viglio	Third place on 22 April 2019	
Courtney Act	Drag queen & singer	Joshua Keefe	Runners-up on 22 April 2019	
Samuel Johnson	Actor & radio presenter	Jorja Freeman	Winners on 22 April 2019	

== Scoring chart ==
The highest score each week is indicated in bold green with a dagger (†), while the lowest score each week is indicated in italicized red with a double-dagger (‡).

Color key:

Winners
Runners-up
Third place
Bottom two
Withdrew from competition
Eliminated

Dancing with the Stars (season 16) - Weekly scores
Couple	Pl.	Week										
Couple	Pl.	1	2	1+2	3	4	5	6	7	8	9	10
Samuel & Jorja	1st	20	20	40	24	17	17+18=35	26	29+28=57	26+24=50	28+18=46 (Note: This couple was in the bottom two, but was not eliminated.)	29+29=58 (Note: This couple finished in first place.)
Courtney & Josh	2nd	**23**†	**21**†	**44**†	**25**†	24	26+23=**49**†	28+5=**33**†	34+28=**62**†	26+28=**54**†	27+29=**56**†	29+30=**59**† (Note: This couple finished in second place.)
Constance & Gustavo	3rd	17	18	35	17	18	16+18=34	15	28+28=56	21+22=43	22+23=45‡	23+24=47‡ (Note: This couple finished in third place.)
Jett & Lily	4th	12	17	29	14	20	21+23=44	17+3=20	26+25=51	16+16=32‡	23+25=48 (Note: This couple was eliminated.)	
Jimmy & Alexandra	5th	16	**21**†	37	23	19	21+23=44	22+3=25	25+28=53	(Note: This couple withdrew from the competition.)		
Curtly & Siobhan	6th	10‡	12	22	15	14	11+18=29‡	9‡	19+25=44‡			
Michelle & Aric	7th	16	18	34	18	21	24+23=47	22+3=25				
Olympia & Jarryd	8th	17	17	34	24	**26**†	19+18=37					
Cassandra & Marco	9th	10‡	10‡	20‡	13	9‡						
Denise & Jeremy	10th	14	14	28	9‡							
Miguel & Megan	11th	13	13	26								

== Weekly scores ==
Unless indicated otherwise, individual judges scores in the charts below (given in parentheses) are listed in this order from left to right: Craig Revel Horwood, Sharna Burgess, Tristan MacManus.

=== Week 1 ===
Couples are listed in the order they performed.

Couple	Scores	Dance	Music
Miguel & Megan	13 (3, 5, 5)	Cha-cha-cha	"Come Get It Bae" – Pharrell Williams
Michelle & Aric	16 (4, 6, 6)	Cha-cha-cha	"Sax" – Fleur East
Olympia & Jarryd	17 (5, 6, 6)	Tango	"Look What You Made Me Do" – Taylor Swift
Jett & Lily	12 (2, 5, 5)	Cha-cha-cha	"24K Magic" – Bruno Mars & Holly Cole
Denise & Jeremy	14 (4, 5, 5)	Viennese waltz	"I Put a Spell on You" – Screamin' Jay Hawkins
Jimmy & Alexandra	16 (3, 7, 6)	Cha-cha-cha	"Youngblood" – 5 Seconds of Summer
Curtly & Siobhan	10 (2, 4, 4)	Viennese waltz	"Perfect" – Ed Sheeran
Constance & Gustavo	17 (5, 7, 5)	Cha-cha-cha	"Think" – Aretha Franklin
Cassandra & Marco	10 (1, 5, 4)	Viennese waltz	"Feeling Good" – Nina Simone
Samuel & Jorja	20 (6, 7, 7)	Tango	"Believer" – Imagine Dragons
Courtney & Josh	23 (8, 8, 7)	Jive	"Feel It Still" – Portugal. The Man

=== Week 2: My Jam Monday ===
Each couple performed one unlearned dance to their favourite song. Couples are listed in the order they performed.

Couple	Scores	Dance	Music	Result
Courtney & Josh	21 (6, 7, 8)	Cha-cha-cha	"Wannabe" – Spice Girls	Safe
Jett & Lily	17 (4, 6, 7)	Samba	"Feels" – Calvin Harris, feat. Pharrell Williams & Katy Perry	Safe
Denise & Jeremy	14 (3, 5, 6)	Jive	"Friends" – Bette Midler	Safe
Curtly & Siobhan	12 (2, 5, 5)	Samba	"(You Gotta Walk And) Don't Look Back" – Peter Tosh & Mick Jagger	Safe
Miguel & Megan	13 (2, 5, 6)	Tango	"The Greatest Show" – Panic! at the Disco	Eliminated
Olympia & Jarryd	17 (5, 6, 6)	Cha-cha-cha	"One Kiss" – Calvin Harris & Dua Lipa	Safe
Jimmy & Alexandra	21 (7, 7, 7)	Jive	"Don't Stop Me Now" – Queen	Safe
Michelle & Aric	18 (6, 6, 6)	Jive	"Shake It Off" – Taylor Swift	Safe
Cassandra & Marco	10 (2, 4, 4)	Quickstep	"Dancing" – Kylie Minogue	Safe
Constance & Gustavo	18 (6, 6, 6)	Quickstep	"Valerie" – Mark Ronson & Amy Winehouse	Safe
Samuel & Jorja	20 (4, 8, 8)	Cha-cha-cha	"Finesse" – Bruno Mars	Safe

=== Week 3: Most Memorable Year ===
Each couple performed one unlearned dance to celebrate the most memorable year of their lives. Couples are listed in the order they performed.

Couple	Scores	Dance	Music	Result
Michelle & Aric	18 (4, 7, 7)	Tango	"Sweet Disposition" – The Temper Trap	Safe
Constance & Gustavo	17 (5, 6, 6)	Contemporary	"Rise Up" – Andra Day	Safe
Curtly & Siobhan	15 (3, 6, 6)	Paso doble	"Another One Bites the Dust" – Queen	Safe
Jett & Lily	14 (3, 6, 5)	Tango	"Can't Hold Us" – Macklemore & Ryan Lewis, feat. Ray Dalton	Safe
Denise & Jeremy	9 (1, 4, 4)	Cha-cha-cha	"I Will Survive" – Gloria Gaynor	Eliminated
Jimmy & Alexandra	23 (7, 8, 8)	Rumba	"Amazed" – Lonestar	Safe
Cassandra & Marco	13 (3, 5, 5)	Foxtrot	"Brave" – Sara Bareilles	Safe
Olympia & Jarryd	24 (8, 8, 8)	Contemporary	"Praying" – Kesha	Safe
Courtney & Josh	25 (8, 9, 8)	Tango	"Real Men" – Joe Jackson	Safe
Samuel & Jorja	24 (8, 8, 8)	Contemporary	"See You Again" – Wiz Khalifa, feat. Charlie Puth	Safe

=== Week 4: Latin Night ===
Each couple performed one unlearned Latin routine. Couples are listed in the order they performed.

Couple	Scores	Dance	Music	Result
Samuel & Jorja	17 (5, 6, 6)	Samba	"Mas Que Nada" – Sergio Mendes, feat. The Black Eyed Peas	Safe
Jett & Lily	20 (6, 7, 7)	Rumba	"When I Was Your Man" – Bruno Mars	Safe
Jimmy & Alexandra	19 (5, 7, 7)	Salsa	"I Know You Want Me (Calle Ocho)" – Pitbull	Safe
Michelle & Aric	21 (7, 7, 7)	Paso doble	"Survivor" – 2WEI	Safe
Curtly & Siobhan	14 (4, 5, 5)	Cha-cha-cha	"Smooth" – Santana, feat. Rob Thomas	Safe
Cassandra & Marco	9 (2, 3, 4)	Cha-cha-cha	"Oye Como Va" – Tito Puente	Eliminated
Olympia & Jarryd	26 (8, 9, 9)	Argentine tango	"Época" – Gotan Project	Safe
Constance & Gustavo	18 (6, 6, 6)	Samba	"Cheap Thrills" – Sia	Safe
Courtney & Josh	24 (8, 8, 8)	Samba	"La Isla Bonita" – Madonna	Safe

=== Week 5: Movie Night ===
Each couple performed one unlearned dance, and then performed a team dance. Couples are listed in the order they performed.

Couple	Scores	Dance	Music	Film	Result
Olympia & Jarryd	19 (7, 6, 6)	Jive	"You Never Can Tell" – Chuck Berry	Pulp Fiction	Eliminated
Constance & Gustavo	16 (4, 6, 6)	Paso doble	"This Is Me" – Keala Settle	The Greatest Showman	Safe
Curtly & Siobhan	11 (2, 4, 5)	Tango	"Mamma Mia" – ABBA	Mamma Mia!	Safe
Samuel & Jorja	17 (5, 6, 6)	Rumba	"Shallow" – Lady Gaga & Bradley Cooper	A Star Is Born	Safe
Jett & Lily	21 (7, 7, 7)	Jive	"Happy" – Pharrell Williams	Despicable Me 2	Safe
Michelle & Aric	24 (8, 8, 8)	Viennese waltz	"A Thousand Years" – Christina Perri	Breaking Dawn - Part 1	Safe
Jimmy & Alexandra	21 (7, 7, 7)	Viennese waltz	"Earned It" – The Weeknd	Fifty Shades of Grey	Safe
Courtney & Josh	26 (8, 9, 9)	Quickstep	"I Won't Dance" – Fred Astaire & Ginger Rogers	Roberta	Safe
Courtney & Josh Jett & Lily Jimmy & Alexandra Michelle & Aric	23 (7, 8, 8)	Team Freestyle (Team La La Land)	"City of Stars" & "Another Day of Sun" (from La La Land)		
Constance & Gustavo Curtly & Siobhan Olympia & Jarryd Samuel & Jorja	18 (6, 6, 6)	Team Freestyle (Team Bohemian Rhapsody)	"We Will Rock You" & "Bohemian Rhapsody" – Queen (from Bohemian Rhapsody)		

=== Week 6: Dance-Off ===
Grant Denyer did not appear as co-host; he was absent due to being in hospital. Denise Scott filled in for Denyer.

Each couple performed one unlearned dance. The couple with the highest score earned immunity from elimination and five additional points, while the rest of the couples participated in dance-offs for additional points. Couples are listed in the order they performed.

Couple	Scores	Dance	Music	Result
Michelle & Aric	22 (6, 8, 8)	Quickstep	"Crazy In Love" – Emeli Sande	Eliminated
Jett & Lily	17 (5, 6, 6)	Foxtrot	"In My Blood" – Shawn Mendes	Safe
Jimmy & Alexandra	22 (7, 8, 7)	Foxtrot	"Hold My Girl" – George Ezra	Safe
Curtly & Siobhan	9 (2, 3, 4)	Jive	"What I Like About You" – The Romantics	Safe
Constance & Gustavo	15 (5, 5, 5)	Jive	"Ex's & Oh's" – Elle King	Safe
Samuel & Jorja	26 (8, 9, 9)	Jazz	"Mr Bojangles" – Jerry Jeff Walker	Safe
Courtney & Josh	28 (9, 10, 9)	Contemporary	"Creep" – Radiohead	Immunity

For each dance-off, the couple with the highest remaining score picked the opponent against whom they wanted to dance; the opponent chose the dance style (samba, cha-cha-cha, or jive). The winner of each dance-off earned three additional points.

Couple	Dance	Music	Result
Jett & Lily	Jive	"Runaway Baby" – Bruno Mars	Winners
Samuel & Jorja	Jive	"Runaway Baby" – Bruno Mars	Losers
Jimmy & Alexandra	Samba	"Despacito" – Luis Fonsi, feat. Daddy Yankee & Justin Bieber	Winners
Curtly & Siobhan	Samba	"Despacito" – Luis Fonsi, feat. Daddy Yankee & Justin Bieber	Losers
Michelle & Aric	Cha-cha-cha	"September" – Earth, Wind & Fire	Winners
Constance & Gustavo	Cha-cha-cha	"September" – Earth, Wind & Fire	Losers

=== Week 7: Judges' Team-up Challenge ===
Individual judges scores in the chart below (given in parentheses) are listed in this order from left to right: Craig Revel Horwood, Bindi Irwin, Sharna Burgess, Tristan MacManus

Grant Denyer did not appear as co-host for the second week in a row; he was absent due to being in hospital. The Loop host & Studio 10 reporter Scott Tweedie filled in for Denyer.

Each couple performed one unlearned dance and then teamed up with another couple and one of the judges for a second routine. Each judge designed the routine, coached their teams, and performed with them, while the two non-performing judges and guest judge Bindi Irwin scored their routine. Couples are listed in the order they performed.

Couple	Scores	Dance	Music	Result
Jimmy & Alexandra	25 (6, 6, 6, 7)	Paso doble	"Natural" – Imagine Dragons	Bottom two
Courtney & Josh	34 (8, 9, 8, 9)	Viennese waltz	"If I Ain't Got You" – Alicia Keys	Safe
Jett & Lily	26 (6, 6, 7, 7)	Paso doble	"Take Me Out" – Franz Ferdinand	Safe
Constance & Gustavo	28 (7, 7, 7, 7)	Rumba	"Thinking Out Loud" – Ed Sheeran	Safe
Curtly & Siobhan	19 (4, 5, 5, 5)	Foxtrot	"Mack the Knife" – Bobby Darin	Eliminated
Samuel & Jorja	29 (7, 8, 8, 6)	Viennese waltz	"Hallelujah" – Leonard Cohen	Safe
Jimmy & Alexandra Courtney & Josh (with Craig Revel Horwood)	28 (X, 10, 9, 9)	Jazz	"Easy Street (Reprise)" – from Annie	
Curtly & Siobhan Jett & Lily (with Tristan MacManus)	25 (8, 8, 9, X)	Paso doble & Tango	"Thunderstruck" – AC/DC	
Constance & Gustavo Samuel & Jorja (with Sharna Burgess)	28 (9, 9, X, 10)	Jive	"Fishies" – The Cat Empire	

Judges' votes to save

- Horwood: Jimmy & Alexandra
- Burgess: Jimmy & Alexandra
- MacManus: Did not vote, but would have voted to save Jimmy & Alexandra

=== Week 8: Trio Night ===
On April 8, 2019, it was announced a few hours before the show that Jimmy Rees had voluntarily withdrawn from the competition for personal reasons. As a result, there was no additional elimination.

Grant Denyer did not appear as co-host for the third week in a row due to being hospitalized. Denise Scott filled in for him for a second time.

Couples are listed in the order they performed.

Couple	Order	Scores	Dance	Music
Courtney & Josh (with Jarryd Byrne)	1	26 (8, 9, 9)	Jazz	"Bad Romance" – Lady Gaga
Courtney & Josh (with Jarryd Byrne)	5	28 (9, 10, 9)	Paso doble	"Die Another Day" – Madonna
Jett & Lily (with Siobhan Power)	2	16 (4, 6, 6)	Quickstep	"Wake Me Up" – Avicii
Jett & Lily (with Siobhan Power)	8	16 (3, 6, 7)	Salsa	"Light It Up" – Major Lazer
Samuel & Jorja (with Megan Wragg)	3	26 (9, 9, 8)	Quickstep	"Mr. Pinstripe Suit" – Big Bad Voodoo Daddy
Samuel & Jorja (with Megan Wragg)	6	24 (8, 8, 8)	Paso doble	"Run Boy Run" – Woodkid
Constance & Gustavo (with Marco De Angelis)	4	21 (7, 7, 7)	Viennese waltz	"You Are the Reason" – Calum Scott
Constance & Gustavo (with Marco De Angelis)	7	22 (6, 8, 8)	Tango	"Santa María (del Buen Ayre)" – Gotan Project

=== Week 9: Semifinals ===
After a three-week absence recovering from a back injury, Grant Denyer returned as co-host.

In the first round, each couple performed a redemption dance. In the second round, each couple performed a fusion dance of two dance styles dedicated to a meaningful person in their life.

Couples are listed in the order they performed.

Couple	Scores	Dance	Music	Result
Courtney & Josh	27 (9, 9, 9)	Samba	"Hip Hip Chin Chin" – Club des Belugas	Safe
Courtney & Josh	29 (9, 10, 10)	Foxtrot & Tango	"Toxic" – Britney Spears	Safe
Jett & Lily	23 (7, 8, 8)	Tango	"Love Me Again" – John Newman	Eliminated
Jett & Lily	25 (8, 8, 9)	Cha-cha-cha & Jive	"Sucker" – Jonas Brothers	Eliminated
Constance & Gustavo	22 (6, 8, 8)	Paso doble	"Confident" – Demi Lovato	Safe
Constance & Gustavo	23 (7, 8, 8)	Cha-cha-cha & Quickstep	"Nothing Breaks Like a Heart" – Mark Ronson, feat. Miley Cyrus	Safe
Samuel & Jorja	28 (8, 10, 10)	Rumba	"Say You Won't Let Go" – James Arthur	Bottom two
Samuel & Jorja	18 (5, 7, 6)	Cha-cha-cha & Tango	"Giant" – Calvin Harris & Rag'n'Bone Man	Bottom two

Judges' votes to save

- Horwood: Samuel & Jorja
- Burgess: Samuel & Jorja
- MacManus: Did not vote, but would have voted to save Jett & Lily

=== Week 10: Grand Finale ===
In the first round, the couples performed an 'encore dance' which is their favourite dance of the season. In the second round, they performed a freestyle routine.

The show also included a 'special guest' appearance by Australian singer and songwriter Conrad Sewell, who sang his songs Love Me Anyway & Healing Hands before the winner of the show was announced.

Couples are listed in the order they performed.

Couple	Order	Scores	Dance	Music	Result
Courtney & Josh	1	29 (9, 10, 10)	Quickstep	"I Won't Dance" – Fred Astaire & Ginger Rogers	Runners-up
Courtney & Josh	5	30 (10, 10, 10)	Freestyle	"Make Me Feel" – Janelle Monaé	Runners-up
Constance & Gustavo	2	23 (7, 8, 8)	Quickstep	"Valerie" – Mark Ronson & Amy Winehouse	Third place
Constance & Gustavo	4	24 (8, 8, 8)	Freestyle	"(I Can't Get No) Satisfaction" – The Rolling Stones	Third place
Samuel & Jorja	3	29 (9, 10, 10)	Jazz	"Mr Bojangles" – Jerry Jeff Walker	Winners
Samuel & Jorja	6	29 (9, 10, 10)	Freestyle	"Dancin' Fool" – Barry Manilow	Winners

== Dance chart ==
The celebrities and professional partners danced one of these routines for each corresponding week:

- Week 1: One unlearned dance
- Week 2 ("My Jam Monday"): One unlearned dance
- Week 3 (Most Memorable Year Night): One unlearned dance
- Week 4 (Latin Night): One unlearned dance
- Week 5 (Movie Night): One unlearned dance & team dance
- Week 6 (Dance-off): One unlearned dance & dance-off
- Week 7 (Judges' Team Up Challenge): One unlearned dance & team dance
- Week 8 (Trio Night): One unlearned dance & trio dance
- Week 9 (Semifinals): Redemption dance & fusion dance
- Week 10 (Grand Finale): Favourite dance of the season & freestyle

Dancing with the Stars (season 16) - Dance chart
Couple	Week															
Couple	1	2	3	4	5		6		7		8		9		10	
Samuel & Jorja	Tango	Cha-cha-cha	Contemp.	Samba	Rumba	Team; Freestyle	Jazz	Jive	Viennese waltz	Jive	Quickstep	Paso doble	Rumba	Cha-cha-cha & Tango	Jazz	Freestyle
Courtney & Josh	Jive	Cha-cha-cha	Tango	Samba	Quickstep	Team Freestyle	Contemp.	Immunity	Viennese waltz	Jazz	Jazz	Paso doble	Samba	Foxtrot & Tango	Quickstep	Freestyle
Constance & Gustavo	Cha-cha-cha	Quickstep	Contemp.	Samba	Paso doble	Team Freestyle	Jive	Cha-cha-cha	Rumba	Jive	Viennese waltz	Tango	Paso doble	Cha-cha-cha & Quickstep	Quickstep	Freestyle
Jett & Lily	Cha-cha-cha	Samba	Tango	Rumba	Jive	Team Freestyle	Foxtrot	Jive	Paso doble	Paso doble & Tango	Quickstep	Salsa	Tango	Cha-cha-cha & Jive		
Jimmy & Alexandra	Cha-cha-cha	Jive	Rumba	Salsa	Viennese waltz	Team Freestyle	Foxtrot	Samba	Paso doble	Jazz						
Curtly & Siobhan	Viennese waltz	Samba	Paso doble	Cha-cha-cha	Tango	Team Freestyle	Jive	Samba	Foxtrot	Paso doble & Tango						
Michelle & Aric	Cha-cha-cha	Jive	Tango	Paso doble	Viennese waltz	Team Freestyle	Quickstep	Cha-cha-cha								
Olympia & Jarryd	Tango	Cha-cha-cha	Contemp.	Argentine tango	Jive	Team Freestyle										
Cassandra & Marco	Viennese waltz	Quickstep	Foxtrot	Cha-cha-cha												
Denise & Jeremy	Viennese waltz	Jive	Cha-cha-cha													
Miguel & Megan	Cha-cha-cha	Tango														

== Ratings ==
No.	Title	Air date	Timeslot	Overnight ratings		Ref(s)
No.	Title	Air date	Timeslot	Viewers	Rank	Ref(s)
1	Week 1: Premiere	18 February 2019	Monday 7:30pm	621,000	12	
2	Week 2 Elimination	25 February 2019	Monday 7:30pm	498,000 588,000	17 12	
3	Week 3 Elimination	4 March 2019	Monday 7:30pm	492,000 496,000	18 17	
4	Week 4 Elimination	11 March 2019	Monday 7:30pm	484,000 526,000	18 15	
5	Week 5 Elimination	18 March 2019	Monday 7:30pm	492,000 556,000	17 14	
6	Week 6 Elimination	25 March 2019	Monday 7:30pm	446,000 464,000	19 18	
7	Week 7 Elimination	1 April 2019	Monday 7:30pm	430,000 500,000	19 16	
8	Week 8	8 April 2019	Monday 7:30pm	393,000	20	
9	Week 9 Elimination	15 April 2019	Monday 7:30pm	543,000 556,000	15 14	
10	Week 10 The Winner Announced	22 April 2019	Monday 7:30pm	663,000 687,000	9 7	
