= Sacrifice play =

Sacrifice play may refer to:

- Sacrifice fly, in baseball
- Bunt (baseball), in baseball
- Sacrifice (chess), in chess
- Coup (bridge), a play in the card game contract bridge
- Hold up (bridge), a play in the card game contract bridge

== See also ==
- Sacrifice (disambiguation)
