= Call to Arms (Saxon album) =

Studio album by Saxon
- Released: 3 June 2011
- Studios: Chapel Studios, Lincolnshire, Brighton Electric Studios, Brighton, United Kingdom
- Genre: Heavy metal
- Length: 43:38
- Labels: Militia Guard Music, UDR, EMI
- Producers: Biff Byford, Toby Jepson

Saxon chronology
Into the Labyrinth (2009)	Call to Arms (2011)	Sacrifice (2013)

Singles from Call to Arms
- 1. "Hammer of the Gods" Released: 18 March 2011

Call to Arms is the nineteenth studio album by British heavy metal band Saxon. Call to Arms was released 3 June in Europe; 6 June in Denmark, Finland, and the UK; 8 June in Greece and Poland; 10 June in France. Previously, it was due to be released on 23 May 2011. The album was released on 27 September in North America by EMI. Deep Purple keyboardist Don Airey makes a guest appearance.

== Background and production ==
Saxon frontman Biff Byford stated that the band wanted to "get back to [their] roots," and aimed for a "more working-class sound" with the album.

While recording the album in February 2011, the band posted a message to its fans, calling on them to visit the band at the studio on the evening of 10 February. The reason for the appeal was that the band needed a chorus for the track "Back in '79", and decided to offer its fans the chance to be a part of the recording.

Saxon were originally supposed to appear at the Soundwave festival in Australia, but were forced to cancel their appearance due to delays during recording. The band also issued a statement apologizing to fans for the cancellation.

Two of the tracks on the album were written by Saxon for the movie Hybrid Theory.

The album artwork is derived from Lord Kitchener Wants You, a World War I-era British Army recruitment poster.

== Release and promotion ==
Call to Arms debuted at number 6 on the UK Rock Albums chart. In the US, the album sold about 700 copies in its first week of release and managed to debut at number 51 on the US "Heatseekers" chart.

A digipack version of the album for the North American market featured a seven track bonus disc containing most of Saxon's performance at Castle Donington in 1980.

To promote the album, Saxon have embarked on the "Call to Arms World Tour". The band headlined shows in Europe, North and South America, and Japan. Anvil and Crimes of Passion opened for Saxon in Europe, while the North American shows were opened by Borealis. HammerFall appeared as special guests at the UK shows, while Vanderbuys were presented as special guests at shows in Spain.

"Hammer of the Gods" was released as a single to promote Call to Arms on 18 March 2011. In addition two music videos were made ("Hammer of the Gods" and the title track.) to promote the album.

== Reception ==
Professional ratings
Review scores
Source	Rating
AllMusic	3.5/5 stars
Blabbermouth.net	8/10 stars
Brave Words & Bloody Knuckles	7.5/10 stars
Jukebox: Metal	3/5 stars

Call to Arms has received mostly positive reviews from critics. AllMusic rated the album as 3.5/5 stars. Reviewer Eduardo Rivadavia commented that the band seems to have "stripped down" their sound. Rivadavia stated that "Surviving Against the Odds", "Chasing the Bullet" and "Ballad of the Working Man" were "refreshingly raw and direct". He also compared "Hammer of the Gods" and "Afterburner" to proto-thrash. Rivadavia ultimately said that Call to Arms can be seen as an "aesthetic cousin" to Denim and Leather from 1981.

Music news website Blabbermouth.net, posted a favorable review for the album. Reviewing the North American digipack edition, reviewer Scott Alisoglu called the album "highly recommended" and said that the album would not disappoint any Saxon fan. He further described the album's title track as "epic" and called the 7-track bonus live CD "a high value bonus".

Reviewer Andy Lye, on behalf of Jukebox: Metal, gave the album 3 out of 5 stars. He opined that Saxon sound like "a band out of ideas" on the album, but at the same time he praised the album's last three tracks, "No Rest for the Wicked," "Ballad for the Working Man" and the orchestral version of the title track.

Brave Words & Bloody Knuckles reviewer Mark Gromen commended that Call to Arms "isn't much of a metal record" but rather "[slow], bluesy hard rock" instead. Gromen compared the album's opening track, "Hammer of the Gods", to "Dogs of War" from the 1995 album of the same name. He also compared Don Airey's keyboard parts on "When Doomsday Comes" to the patterns used on Deep Purple's 1984 album Perfect Strangers. Gromen ultimately rated the album at 7.5 out of 10.

== Track listing ==
All songs written by Biff Byford, Paul Quinn, Doug Scarratt, Nibbs Carter and Nigel Glockler

No.	Title	Length
1.	"Hammer of the Gods"	4:23
2.	"Back in 79"	3:28
3.	"Surviving Against the Odds"	2:59
4.	"Mists of Avalon"	5:02
5.	"Call to Arms"	4:28
6.	"Chasing the Bullet"	4:14
7.	"Afterburner"	3:06
8.	"When Doomsday Comes" (Hybrid Theory soundtrack)	4:29
9.	"No Rest for the Wicked"	3:09
10.	"Ballad of the Working Man"	3:48
11.	"Call to Arms" (Orchestral Version)	4:28

iTunes bonus track
No.	Title	Length
12.	"Dirty Double Dealer"	3:31

=== North America bonus disc "Live at Donington 1980" ===
Live at Donington 1980
No.	Title	Writer(s)	Length
1.	"Motorcycle Man"	Biff Byford, Paul Quinn, Graham Oliver, Steve Dawson, Pete Gill
2.	"Still Fit to Boogie"	Byford, Quinn, Oliver, Dawson, Gill
3.	"Freeway Mad"	Byford, Quinn, Oliver, Dawson, Gill
4.	"Backs to the Wall"	Byford, Quinn, Oliver, Dawson, Gill
5.	"Wheels of Steel"	Byford, Quinn, Oliver, Dawson, Gill
6.	"Bap Shoo Ap"
7.	"747 (Strangers in the Night)"	Byford, Quinn, Oliver, Dawson, Gill

== Credits ==
Saxon

- Biff Byford – lead vocals
- Paul Quinn – guitars
- Doug Scarratt – guitars
- Nibbs Carter – bass guitar
- Nigel Glockler – drums

Additional musicians

- Don Airey – keyboards

Production

- Biff Byford – producer
- Toby Jepson – producer

== Charts ==
Chart (2011)	Peak position
German Albums (Offizielle Top 100)	18
Swedish Albums (Sverigetopplistan)	19
Swiss Albums (Schweizer Hitparade)	37
UK Rock & Metal Albums (Official Charts)	6
US Heatseekers Albums (Billboard)	51
