= Revenge season 2 =

Revenge
- Season 2
- DVD cover
- Starring: Madeleine Stowe; Emily VanCamp; Gabriel Mann; Henry Czerny; Ashley Madekwe; Nick Wechsler; Josh Bowman; Barry Sloane; Christa B. Allen; Connor Paolo
- No. of episodes: 22

Release
- Original network: ABC
- Original release: September 30, 2012 – May 12, 2013

Season chronology
- ← Previous; Season 1 Next → Season 3

The second season of the ABC American television drama series Revenge premiered on September 30, 2012. An hour-long recap show of the first season called The First Chapter was shown the week before the premiere on September 26, 2012. The series stars Madeleine Stowe and Emily VanCamp. The season premiere received mixed response from critics, with many praising the acting while criticizing the plot, saying that it didn't live up to the suspense of the first season. Reviews did improve as the season progressed.

== Cast ==
=== Main ===
- Madeleine Stowe as Victoria Grayson
- Emily VanCamp as Emily Thorne
- Gabriel Mann as Nolan Ross
- Henry Czerny as Conrad Grayson
- Ashley Madekwe as Ashley Davenport
- Nick Wechsler as Jack Porter
- Josh Bowman as Daniel Grayson
- Barry Sloane as Aiden Mathis (Note: Sloane was promoted to regular status after episode 14.)
- Christa B. Allen as Charlotte Grayson
- Connor Paolo as Declan Porter

=== Recurring ===
- Margarita Levieva as Amanda Clarke
- Dilshad Vadsaria as Padma Lahari
- J.R. Bourne as Kenny Ryan
- Wendy Crewson as Helen Crowley
- Michael Trucco as Nate Ryan
- Jennifer Jason Leigh as Kara Clarke-Murphy
- Cary-Hiroyuki Tagawa as Satoshi Takeda
- E.J. Bonilla as Marco Romero
- James Tupper as David Clarke
- James Morrison as Gordon Murphy
- Roger Bart as Mason Treadwell
- Seychelle Gabriel as Regina George
- Burn Gorman as Trask
- Jonathan Adams as Matt Duncan
- Emily Alyn Lind as 10-year-old Amanda Clarke
- Collins Pennie as Eli James

=== Guest ===
- Todd Grinnell as Dr. Thomas
- Dylan Walsh as Jason Prosser
- Susan Park as Edith Long / "the Falcon"
- Jessica Tuck as Allison Stoddard
- Adrienne Barbeau as Marion Harper
- Joaquim de Almeida as Salvador Grobet
- Juju Chang as herself
- Clare Carey as Patricia Barnes
- Geoff Pierson as Robert Barnes

== Episodes ==
No. overall	No. in season	Title	Directed by	Written by	Original release date	Prod. code	US viewers (millions)
23	1	"Destiny"	Kenneth Fink	Mike Kelley & Mark B. Perry	September 30, 2012	201	9.74
Emily returns to the Hamptons, intent on uncovering the fate of her mother. When she discovers Victoria is still alive and in hiding, Emily seeks her out. Conrad pays off Charlotte's doctor to keep her in rehab, so he can access her inheritance money to save Grayson Global. Ashley isn't happy to see the return of Emily now that she is dating Daniel. Jack is struggling to keep the bar afloat while also taking care of Declan and Amanda, who is carrying his child.
24	2	"Resurrection"	David Grossman	Sallie Patrick	October 7, 2012	202	8.36
After the success of Conrad's plan to gain Charlotte's inheritance to help Grayson Global, Victoria has no choice but to let him know she is alive. Together, they conspire to frame the white-haired man for her "abduction." Daniel gets Charlotte out of rehab, and Emily introduces Charlotte to her "sister", Amanda. Jack demands that Amanda take a paternity test. When the paternity reveals that Jack is the baby's biological father, Emily lies to Amanda, saying she altered the test and that Jack is not the biological father. Aiden kills the white-haired man after he attacks Emily in her home.
25	3	"Confidence"	J. Miller Tobin	Gretchen J. Berg & Aaron Harberts	October 14, 2012	203	8.28
As Emily tries to get Aiden to leave the Hamptons, her past with him back in Japan in 2008 begins to haunt her. At the same time, Emily discovers a surprising connection between the white-haired man and her mother. Meanwhile, as Declan is caught breaking into Kenny Ryan's residence, Victoria holds a press conference to show that the Graysons are back and stronger than ever, going so far as to reveal the identity of Charlotte's father and welcome "Amanda" into the family. Jack promises to stand by his child, but ends his relationship with Amanda after she breaks her promise to stay away from the Graysons.
26	4	"Intuition"	Randy Zisk	Dan Dworkin & Jay Beattie	October 21, 2012	204	8.71
As all Hamptonites know, playing with the Graysons is treacherous. Victoria throws an impromptu baby shower for Amanda – and then confronts her. Amanda is startled and takes a fall over the banister; the baby is born prematurely and doctors put Amanda in an induced coma. Emily learns that her mother tried to kill her by drowning her when she was younger, which brings her closer to Aiden. Daniel's suspicions about his father are confirmed when he learns that Ashley has been secretly working for Conrad. Ashley's true loyalties are exposed, however, strengthening her relationship to Daniel. Emily's mother, Kara, visits Amanda in the hospital, after hearing of her fall at Grayson Manor.
27	5	"Forgiveness"	Matt Earl Beesley	Sunil Nayar	October 28, 2012	205	8.18
Kara, Emily's mother, arrives in the Grayson home and Victoria asks her to stay a few days. Amanda awakens from her coma and Emily decides to tell her that Jack really is the biological father of their child, Carl. Padma makes a bold move that causes major ramifications for the future of Nolcorp, so Aiden (as Takeda's proxy) investigates for Emily the dealings between Grayson Global and Nolcorp. Mason Treadwell returns, intent on discovering the truth about Amanda Clarke.
28	6	"Illusion"	Bobby Roth	Michael Foley	November 4, 2012	206	7.94
As Victoria and Conrad reaffirm their loyalties to each other, Mason Treadwell digs deeper into Amanda Clarke's past. Emily is forced to intervene and shift Mason's plan to discovering what happened to Gordon Murphy. The Stowaway reopens, which brings the engagement of Jack and Amanda – as Declan and Charlotte rekindle their relationship. Nolan tells Padma he knows of her major mistake – tipping off Daniel that Grayson Global could own a sizable interest in his company – and warns her that they both have to save themselves from Grayson Global. When Mason Treadwell is fooled by Emily, police interrupt Victoria and Conrad's second wedding and arrest Conrad for the murder of Gordon Murphy. This leads the Initiative to propose a deal to Conrad, pulling him and Victoria back with the mysterious Initiative. Mason Treadwell goes back to his original plan and begins to discover Amanda Clarke and Emily Thorne's identities.
29	7	"Penance"	Colin Bucksey	Elle Triedman	November 11, 2012	207	7.73
Mason digs for more information but thinks Emily and Amanda are or were lovers. Amanda agrees to explain everything to Mason, but when she has him alone she tries to kill him. Emily gets there and stops her just in time. Emily reveals the truth, that they have switched identities. She then enlists him in stopping her mother from doing anything crazy. Mason tells her mother the truth about the Graysons as Emily begs him to stop, saying her mother can't mentally handle that information. He tells Emily he's doing it for penance but it appears that he is doing it for the reaction that will follow. Nolan gives Aiden proof of David Clarke's original investment, knowing that Grayson Global will then be entitled to 49% of his company. He does so to help Emily, who he refers to as his "only family." Emily turns to framing Mason for Gordon's murder. The police show up to his house when he isn't there, but Nolan has already been there and changed the suspect list and possibly planted evidence. Kara holds Conrad and Victoria at gunpoint in their rooms. She has already disabled security cameras and has them blindfold themselves. Just before she is about to shoot them, Aiden grabs her with a chloroform rag and drags her out of the house. Aiden, posing as a federal agent, and Emily give Kara medication, money and a car and tell her to leave.
30	8	"Lineage"	Christopher Misiano	Nikki Toscano	November 25, 2012	208	6.92
Most of the episode is a flashback to 2006. Victoria's mother, Marion, wants to have Thanksgiving with Victoria, Conrad, Daniel and her soon to be husband. The fiance is insisting on meeting them, and Marion says this is love and her last chance. During Thanksgiving dinner, Victoria tells her childhood story to her mother's rich boyfriend. Marion had her daughter take the fall for a murder she committed. After serving a six month stay in a mental hospital, Victoria returned home, only to be kicked out at age 15 after her mother saw her then-boyfriend sneaking into Victoria's room one night. It is later revealed that Marion's boyfriend was an actor paid to make Marion think she was about to be set up for life just to have it all come crashing down on her. Now that Marion is crushed with no money or place to go, Victoria kicks her out of the house and finally has her revenge. Meanwhile, Emily meets Aiden while on a mission for Takeda. Aiden was going to kill the man Emily is going after for kidnapping his sister. Emily convinces Takeda to take Aiden on as a student. In Daniel's first year of Harvard he wants to be a poet. His parents don't want this for him and sabotage that path, steering him to Grayson Global. Nolan's CFO in 2006 is Marco, whom he is also dating. Marco discovers that a bank account of Nolan's is completely empty. Nolan explains the $500 million went to pay off the daughter of his investor ─ Emily. Marco gets upset about this because of David Clarke's conviction. Nolan fires Marco. The current day investors in Jack's bar are revealed to be the sons of a man who tried to strong-arm Jack's father (Carl) into paying "protection" money in 2006. He was doing this to all the business owners. Another business owner shoots and kills the brothers' dad with Carl's gun.
31	9	"Revelations"	Kenneth Fink	Ted Sullivan	December 2, 2012	209	7.65
Daniel is continuing to try to be voted as Grayson Global's CEO by the board. He's also continuing to claim a sizable interest in Nolan's company. Daniel tracks down Nolan's former CFO who reveals that $500 million disappeared from an offshore bank account. Since Nolan doesn't want to tell where that money went, he agrees to give a 51% share of his company to Grayson Global. Matt Duncan, the man who was friends with Jack's father and killed the Ryan brother's father, shows up at the christening. He cautions Jack against having anything to do with the Ryan brothers. He finally tells Jack more about the brothers. Jack has Nolan find out information about who they are and discovers that they are criminals, who have forced their way in as business partners. Emily and Aiden discover that Ashley is turning Daniel against Aiden, so they plan on breaking up their relationship by sending Victoria a video of Conrad and Ashley having sex. The plan backfires because Victoria decides to use the video to blackmail Ashley into having sex with an investor in Grayson Global who can swing the CEO vote in their favor. Aiden tells Daniel what Ashley is doing, so he catches them, takes a picture to blackmail the investor into swinging the CEO vote for Daniel, and breaks up with Ashley. Nolan tells Padma it's much easier to destroy a kingdom from within the castle walls, referring to a secret plan he has for Grayson Global. Nolan hires Marco back saying he will find a place for him.
32	10	"Power"	Roger Kumble	Joe Fazzio	January 6, 2013	210	7.12
In order for Emily to seem single and available again, Emily and Aiden fake a break-up in a public setting where Daniel and his father are having lunch. Daniel falls for it and seems excited. Declan discovers the Ryan brothers are trafficking drugs. Jack calls a friend from the police and they raid the bar but find nothing. When the police go to the boat, they find the drugs the Ryan brothers had moved and planted there, along with a gun. Jack takes the fall so they arrest him. A lady from the Initiative, Helen, meets Aiden in an abandoned garage and reveals that his sister Colleen is still alive. Helen suggests that the only way Aiden will see Colleen again is to play by her rules. As Emily works with Victoria in a scheme to protect Daniel, she also plans to take down Judge Robert Barnes and his wife, Patricia. After delving further into Patricia's past and a mysterious note written to her father, Emily convinces her to come clean about corruption in the David Clarke trial, as well as about the letter she sent Amanda, and the fact that her husband beats her, in order to end the judge's career and prevent him from being appointed to the Supreme Court.
33	11	"Sabotage"	John Scott	Dan Dworkin & Jay Beattie	January 13, 2013	211	6.17
Padma tells Nolan that she wants to come back to the company and spend time with him. Ashley blackmails herself back into a job as a public relations consultant with Conrad. After saying he won't help Jack with his legal issues, Conrad agrees to help in order to improve his public name as he is considering running for public office. Padma tells Nolan that she heard the current CFO, Marco, talking with Daniel about a person named "Carrie Ann". Nolan understands what they were talking about was Carrion, a computer program. Nolan had already suspected that Marco told Daniel about it, but Marco had sworn he didn't. Nolan fires Marco. Padma then calls the woman from the Initiative, Helen, revealing that she has been pulling the strings for Daniel since he was hired as CEO. A fundraiser and wine auction provide the perfect backdrop for Emily and Aiden's next plan of attack, staging an abduction of Aiden and Helen, as she knows where Aiden's sister is located. Emily and Nolan dress in masks and have it set up so Aiden will supposedly kill one of them, allowing just enough time to escape. This is to get the Initiative to trust Aiden. Victoria strategically plots her next move to undermine Daniel as the CEO of Grayson Global by having a business rival attempt to outbid Daniel at a charity auction. When that fails, she slips him information about Stonehaven United, a business Daniel intends on buying, because she knows that is the Initiative's plan for Daniel and she is scared for him.
34	12	"Collusion"	Matt Shakman	Sallie Patrick & Sunil Nayar	January 20, 2013	212	5.75
Emily is realizing how much she misses Aiden since they "broke up" so she could rekindle her relationship with Daniel. Victoria has flown to L.A. to try to circumvent Daniel from successfully acquiring Stonehaven and push his competitor towards victory. Padma refers to something she couldn't have known without spying, and Nolan finally suspects she is up to no good. He gets confirmation and then decides to play her based on Emily's advice. Jack gets a confession from his father's friend about the murder of the Ryan brother's father on a hidden tape. Conrad offers that proof and $50,000 to the Ryan brothers to sell their share in the bar to Conrad. Daniel has Emily accompany him to Los Angeles to help purchase Stonehaven United. Victoria wants Emily to stop Daniel. Helen continues to manipulate Aiden by telling him they have his sister Colleen, showing a video as proof she's alive. Helen tells Aiden that she believes he was involved in their abduction. Aiden is about to kill Victoria to prove his alliance to Helen, but tells Emily he is just supposed to prevent Victoria from stopping Stonehaven's purchase. Emily accomplishes this but then discovers Aiden's plan to kill Victoria, stopping him just in time by telling him her death might cause Daniel to rebel against Helen. Charlotte reveals to her family that she's changing her last name from Grayson to Clarke. Emily decides to come clean to Daniel, admitting that Victoria asked her to get close to Daniel again. Daniel surprises her by saying he already figured that Victoria had meddled. Nate Ryan convinces Conrad to listen to his plan on strong-arming the local business owners so they can develop the docks into a thriving location, arguing that creating these jobs could have a positive effect on Conrad's image and wallet. Aiden shows up at Emily's house with a video of his sister seemingly being killed by an overdose. He becomes very angry at Emily, blaming her for stopping him from killing Victoria.
35	13	"Union"	Wendey Stanzler	Michael Foley & Ted Sullivan	February 10, 2013	213	5.20
Nolan discovers that the video of Aiden's sister's death was filmed six years ago. Aiden and Emily find proof from a New Jersey morgue that his sister is dead. Aiden's guilt causes him to be upset with himself and take it out on Emily. Later, they get back on the same page and plan to take revenge for his sister's murder. Victoria overhears Helen giving Daniel instructions on a business plan, so she gives him documents proving the Initiative was behind the crash of Flight 197, even though she was told they'd kill Daniel if he was told the truth. Helen sees this on the camera hidden in Daniel's office. Daniel calls and distances himself from Emily out of concern that she'll be harmed for being close to him. Later, Helen visits Victoria's home and threatens her, but Victoria kills Helen. Amanda convinces Jack to accept money from Emily, but when Jack attempts to pay back Conrad's loan, Conrad refuses to accept it and informs Jack about the plans to develop the docks. Conrad arranges for the bank to demand the entire loan be paid because of Jack's lack of credit worthiness. Jack doesn't want to tell Amanda yet, but she overhears. Amanda blackmails Conrad into selling the bar back to Jack with an incriminating video on Emily's computer. Once Nate Ryan is told, he plans on "taking care of the problem," so they can continue with developing the docks. Nolan confronts Padma about double crossing him. He believes her father is being held by the Initiative against his will. Padma confirms that this is true. Jack and Amanda marry and then sail off on their boat planning a few days' trip. The episode ends with Declan trying to reach them on the radio to ask a question. The viewer sees Nate Ryan cutting the cable to the radio while Jack and Amanda are up on deck and don't know he's aboard the boat.
36	14	"Sacrifice"	Stefan Schwartz	Mark B. Perry & Joe Fazzio	February 17, 2013	214	5.99
The Graysons devise a plan to dispose of Helen's body without the Initiative figuring out Victoria killed her. Since their plan will make the Initiative believe Helen left the Grayson home alive, they plant evidence to make it look like Helen was at Amanda's before she disappeared. Emily finds out Nate Ryan is on the boat and knows he's up to no good. She and Nolan take off to track the boat. Once Jack and Amanda discover Nate Ryan is on the boat, they think of ways to distract him and finally lock him in the boat's cabin so they can get in the emergency raft and escape. While Nate is shooting through the door to get out, he shoots Jack. Amanda stays behind and sends the raft out with Jack inside so he'll be safe. Emily and Nolan find Jack, and Nolan takes him to the hospital while Emily goes to save Amanda. Amanda and Emily fight Nate; a stray bullet causes flammable fumes to leak. Emily makes it out, but Amanda gets hurt in the explosion. She later dies in the water. Padma tells the Initiative she wants proof that her father is alive, before continuing to help them. They send a finger of his to show her that they're not to be questioned or disobeyed.
37	15	"Retribution"	Helen Hunt	Nikki Toscano & Elle Triedman	March 10, 2013	215	6.97
Still reeling from the devastation on The Amanda, Emily's commitment to justice and revenge is stronger than ever, while the Hamptons mourn the loss of Amanda Clarke, one of their own. Jack knows the Graysons had Amanda killed, but pretends he doesn't know. Jack finds Emily Thorne's missing laptop computer with all the incriminating evidence against the Graysons on it. He can't get past the password, but does find Amanda's written notes that Emily and Amanda previously knew each other and were best friends, facts that they had kept from Jack. Emily had Aiden steal her laptop computer back from Jack and then throws it in the ocean. She wants to get revenge against the Graysons, not just send them to prison. The Initiative continue to investigate the disappearance of Helen. Aiden is trying to get close to Daniel again, but Daniel is suspicious that he works for The Initiative. Nolan gives the secret Carrion software program to Padma, so she can give it to the Initiative and save her father. At Amanda's grave, Emily runs into someone saying he's the foster brother of Amanda Clarke and that Amanda burned down his house.
38	16	"Illumination"	Bobby Roth	Michael Foley & Sallie Patrick	March 17, 2013	216	6.57
Jack is suspicious when Conrad and Victoria start a charity in Amanda Clarke's name. Emily's past catches up with her, when her foster brother, Eli, whom she has not seen for 14 years, arrives in the Hamptons. Victoria asks Eli for help with her charitable foundation. Emily pays Eli to keep him quiet about her past, and has Nolan erase his criminal history as part of the deal so that he will leave town as soon as possible. Eli donates all of the money from Emily to the Amanda Clarke foundation, and plans to stick around for a while. Daniel reveals to Emily that the Graysons are using the Amanda Clarke foundation to protect their assets when trouble comes. Emily and Nolan plan to use Carrion to take away the Graysons' fortune in one fell swoop, only to discover that a master hacker who helped take down David Clarke has started to work for the Graysons again, and has found a way to prevent Carrion from draining the charity's account. Jack continues to sink into depression as he finds out just how much he did not know about Amanda's past, as well as what Emily kept from him.
39	17	"Victory"	Colin Bucksey	Dan Dworkin & Jay Beattie	March 24, 2013	217	6.31
Padma returns, and shows Nolan the Initiative's newest threat to get her to deliver the program Carrion. Aiden and Nolan set up sniper surveillance while Padma meets with the Initiative to deliver Carrion. Something goes wrong, and they lose radio contact with Padma as the Initiative takes her too. Emily and Eli return to their former foster home to try to find some of "Amanda's" old belongings, but they are told her things were lost in the fire Amanda started while living there. Meredith is to receive checks from the charity to help foster children in her home. At the presentation of the Amanda Clarke Foundation's check to Meredith Hayward and Hayward House, Eli tells the truth about his horrible experiences living there. Enraged and humiliated, Meredith reveals that he was really the one who set the fire that Amanda was blamed for. Victoria immediately fires Eli as foundation co-chair. Emily confronts him about the fire, and he says it's true but he only did it to get her in trouble so that they could stay together. Jack continues to try to find out what really happened on the Amanda's last voyage from one of the Ryans, who tells him that there are recorded conversations with Conrad. Jack accepts an offer from Conrad to help bring in the Average Joe votes for his campaign. Eli threatens and intimidates Meredith into writing a confession, which he gives to Emily, revealing that the letters her father sent her were sold to Mason Treadwell. Emily visits him in prison, and discovers that Victoria has another son who was put into foster care. Victoria doesn't like that Emily and Daniel are reconnecting. She sends an anonymous letter to Daniel with a picture taken of them with two bullets in the envelope, wanting to scare Daniel into distancing himself from Emily to protect her. Emily continues to try to make amends with Jack but he's resistant.
40	18	"Masquerade"	Allison Liddi-Brown	Sunil Nayar & JaSheika James	March 31, 2013	218	5.49
Hamptonites celebrate Halloween with a glamorous masquerade ball hosted by the Graysons, which is a perfect setting for Emily to drag out Victoria's skeletons. Emily has sent cards as if she were Victoria's son who was given up for adoption and played so many mind tricks on Victoria that she faints at the party. Victoria lies to Conrad, saying the pregnancy was terminated. Victoria visits the nun who handled the adoption and is assured that her son doesn't know who she is. It is later revealed that Emily followed Victoria and tells the nun she is pregnant and needs help, presumably to get information. Jack steps up his revenge plan by sabotaging a small town hall event for Conrad, having a question about David Clarke asked. Jack plays secretly taped conversations in Conrad's earpiece. After overhearing how Conrad treats Ashley, Jack tells her what he has been doing; she wants to help. Aiden makes a bold move that causes The Initiative to pull their investments from Grayson Global. While Mr. Trask is leaving, Aiden makes him go to where Padma was at gunpoint. Padma and her father have been killed that day. Aiden strangles Mr. Trask. Daniel gives the two bullets Victoria sent anonymously back to her so she knows he was on to her plan. The police suspect Nolan of Padma's murder.
41	19	"Identity"	Charlie Stratton	Joe Fazzio & Ted Sullivan	April 28, 2013	219	6.05
Victoria continues to lie about her son, but the truth comes out in a Nightline interview: she gave him up for adoption to go to school in Europe. This revelation will hurt Conrad's campaign, giving Ashley the chance she needs to start getting closer to Conrad while really working with Jack. Daniel reaches out to Mr. Takeda because he's suspicious of Aiden. Mr. Takeda wants Aiden to return to Japan but he won't do it. After beating the Falcon in a video game, Nolan gets the Falcon to do some work for him. Doing this exposes the Falcon's computer to be hacked by Nolan; he steals the Falcon's information and he has the FBI arrest her for hacking. During an interview, Emily says she'd love to join the Grayson family. This brings her closer with Daniel but tears her relationship with Jack apart. Jack feels betrayed that she's so close with the Graysons, who took Amanda's life. Victoria comes to Nolan asking him to find her lost son. In return he will be the sole owner of his company again. A new friend of Charlotte is pulling her back into the party life and away from Declan.
42	20	"Engagement"	John Terlesky	Elle Triedman & Salle Patrick	May 5, 2013	220	6.28
Emily arranges a romantic dinner on a rooftop to accept Daniel's marriage proposal, with two tickets to Paris. Daniel gets excited by the idea and asks Conrad to withdraw his trust fund from the Amanda Clarke Foundation. Conrad tries to make him reconsider but ends up giving it. Meanwhile, Takeda sends Aiden's employee records to Grayson Global and Daniel discovers that Aiden Mathis was the son of the luggage carrier who took the bomb to "Flight 197" and promptly fires him. Ashley and Jack are conspiring to take Conrad's gubernatorial campaign down and decide that Jack should take Conrad's picture with Stoddard's wife to Victoria, saying that he wants to save his campaign and avoid a major scandal for Conrad. Victoria thanks him and says that Jack was responsible for Emily and Daniel's breakup last summer. Victoria confronts Allison Stoddard about her encounter with Conrad. Allison says that they are meeting because she is sabotaging her husband's campaign, because he has a serious heart condition and may not survive another term as governor. Aiden asks Nolan to help him make Emily forfeit her quest for vengeance, saying that he didn't find "closure"; his quest for his sister's murderer only made him suffer and this vendetta will make Emily suffer too. He asks Nolan to hack the Amanda Clarke Foundation bank account and withdraw all the money from it while he still has access to it as treasurer of the foundation, thus withdrawing all the Graysons' fortune. Nolan visits "The Falcon" in jail and tries to extract information about Victoria's son, the Carrion fate and the Foundation bank account. She replies with a riddle which Nolan must solve. Later that night, Emily and Daniel give an engagement reception at Emily's house. Victoria confronts Emily about her true intentions with her son and Emily fires back with David Clarke memories and how "the house" is really messing with her head. Takeda confronts Emily about Aiden's role in her quest and says that nobody should walk that road except for her. He says that Aiden will be removed from her quest, and her life. Meanwhile, Charlotte and Regina are partying around town and, as they are walking out of a nightclub, find Declan looking for Charlotte. Charlotte vomits on a trash can, appearing to be drunk and is arrested in front of Regina and Declan because she is below the legal drinking age. Daniel learns of Charlotte's arrest and leaves the engagement party to help his sister while Declan and Regina search for ATM machines to get money to pay Charlotte's bail. Aiden confronts Takeda about the whole vengeance plans and insinuates that Takeda has another reason to want Emily to continue with her revenge quest. They battle and Aiden kills Takeda with a katana. Charlotte tells Daniel that she is behaving badly because she doesn't want to take anybody else to her family and reveals to him that she is pregnant. The newspapers reveal Allison and Victoria's conversation about Mark Stoddard, leading Conrad's campaign to almost certain victory. Emily finds out about Aiden and Nolan hacking the Foundation's bank account and tries to convince them to stop the transfer, unsuccessfully. After that, a blackout strikes the entire Manhattan, which Nolan promptly associates with the Initiative misuse of Carrion.
43–44	21–22	"Truth"	Randy Zisk	Michael Foley & Nikki Toscano	May 12, 2013	221	6.12
43–44	21–22	"Truth"	J. Miller Tobin	Mike Kelley & Mark B. Perry	May 12, 2013	222	6.12
The blackout of Manhattan is in full effect. Charlotte has just told Daniel that she is pregnant, Conrad is getting his campaign ready for victory, and Victoria is at the Stowaway with Jack (Carl is said to be out of town with his grandmother). Jack tells Victoria his whole plan for getting revenge. Victoria tells Conrad that Jack and Ashley have been working against him. Emily and Nolan find Takeda's body, and Emily realizes that it was Aiden who killed him. Aiden tells Emily that Takeda has been using her all along; Takeda's fiancée was on Flight 197. Regina and Declan are trapped in a bank and Declan realizes that Regina is actually in love with Charlotte. Regina plants money in Declan's coat and bruises herself to show Charlotte later that Declan is wrong for her. Victoria finds out that Charlotte is pregnant with Declan's baby. As Daniel works feverishly to turn Aiden in to the authorities, Emily and Nolan become aware of an assassin, Gregor Hoffman, who has been hired by Conrad to bomb Grayson Global. This is a plot to show his voters how he reacts in a disaster. Conrad sends Jack a message from Ashley's phone, telling him that he found Emily's computer that contains incriminating information on the Graysons, and where it is – Grayson Global. Emily, who disposed of the laptop herself, realizes it's a trap and rushes to Grayson Global to save Jack, knowing the bomb will go off when he arrives. As Emily tries to intercept Jack, Conrad is speaking to his supporters, surrounded by Daniel and Victoria. Everyone in Manhattan suddenly receives a text message declaring "Long Live David Clarke". Then the bomb goes off. After the blast, Emily rushes into the Grayson Global building to save Jack; she sees a man lying on the ground, but is rushed out by firefighters before she can see who it is. It is confirmed to not be Jack as, across town, he shows up at NolCorp and asks Nolan how he knew about the bomb. Conrad takes the lead in rescue efforts, making him look good in front of the cameras. It is revealed Declan was the one injured in the blast, and is now in hospital. Jack, who agrees to pretend to be dead for the time being, sneaks into the hospital in a stolen uniform without being noticed, and speaks with his brother. Declan insists he is fine, although he will need heart surgery, so he cannot leave. Declan also tells Jack that Charlotte is pregnant with his baby. Nolan visits Declan and remains while he has surgery. Jack comes back to find Nolan sitting in Declan's room with an empty bed. He shows Jack a video Declan made of Declan saying goodbye. Declan is dead. Aiden, knowing he will be held responsible for the Manhattan blackout, flees New York, but the media reports Aiden, now a terrorist suspect, has been captured by the FBI attempting to cross the border to Canada. Later, all charges are dropped and Aiden is released, with federal authorities going after Nolan instead. Nolan suffers the same fate as David Clarke: he is arrested by the FBI, who storm his office on charges of treason against the United States. The feds don't believe his claims of innocence because of his recorded friendship with Clarke, he learns the Falcon has denied everything and claimed he was behind the blackout, and finally a video is shown of deceased Padma Lahari. Padma, clearly forced to speak by the Initiative, declares Nolan is the "blind disciple" of David Clarke, and her lover was and is an anarchist and genius believing his judgment should affect the world. She finishes by stating "Nolan is Americon Initiative" (or a terrorist mastermind like Clarke). Nolan realizes he has been blamed for the Initiative's actions, which was their plan from the start. Daniel and Victoria each individually turn on Conrad; the former when he finds out that Conrad knew about the bomb beforehand, and the latter when she learns that Conrad joined "The Initiative" earlier that year. He had become a member of a private group of businesspeople who profited from these attacks, all for the sake of his own fortunes and family. The heartbreaking death of his brother leaves Jack frantic and unsure of his own sanity; deciding he has nothing left to lose, he goes to Grayson Manor and steals a gun. Running into Victoria, he threatens her with it, knowing she betrayed him. He decides, instead, that it is a worse punishment to make her live with all the guilt she has. Charlotte returns to recover from the bombing, and Victoria comforts her, deciding against telling her about Declan's death for the time being. Jack goes to Conrad's speech, with it now official he won the election and he is Governor-Elect of New York State. Emily rushes to find Jack before he kills Conrad. Daniel shows up at Emily's house where he finds Aiden. The two men fight and Aiden defeats his former boss, finishing by crashing him into Emily's desk. Aiden says he’s giving Daniel a pass to live, and tells Daniel to let Emily go. Daniel, lying on the floor and overcome with rage, notices he has landed within a foot of Emily's gun, which has spilled onto the floor with him. Daniel comes to Conrad's speech with blood on his shirt sleeve, suggesting that he killed Aiden with Emily's gun – Aiden is not seen again afterwards. Victoria, alone with her guilt, is sitting at home watching Conrad's victory speech, when her door bell rings. She goes to answer it and it is Patrick. Emily locates Jack. She rushes up the stairs to where he has the gun pointed at Conrad, who makes a point of praising Declan in his speech, using it as capital for his popularity. Emily says that he can't do this; Jack says this has nothing to do with her. She proclaims that it has everything to do with her. Emily, forced to evaluate her quest for revenge after so many heartbreaking deaths, steps in front of the gun and says that she should have left him out of "all this" (her revenge). She begs Jack to really look at her and announces to him that she is Amanda Clarke.

== Ratings ==
No. in series	No. in season	Title	Air date	Rating/share (18–49)	Viewers (millions)	DVR viewers	Total (18–49)	Total viewers (Live+7)
23	1	"Destiny"	September 30, 2012	3.2/8	9.74	2.79	4.3	12.530
24	2	"Resurrection"	October 7, 2012	2.6/6	8.36	2.91	3.8	11.27
25	3	"Confidence"	October 14, 2012	2.6/6	8.28	2.80	3.8	11.08
26	4	"Intuition"	October 21, 2012	2.8/6	8.71	2.88	4.0	11.59
27	5	"Forgiveness"	October 28, 2012	2.7/6	8.18	3.13	4.0	11.31
28	6	"Illusion"	November 4, 2012	2.7/6	7.94	3.08	4.0	11.01
29	7	"Penance"	November 11, 2012	2.5/6	7.73	3.35	3.8	10.98
30	8	"Lineage"	November 25, 2012	2.2/5	6.92	3.13	3.6	10.04
31	9	"Revelations"	December 2, 2012	2.4/5	7.65	2.83	3.5	10.47
32	10	"Power"	January 6, 2013	2.4/6	7.12	2.86	3.5	9.98
33	11	"Sabotage"	January 13, 2013	2.0/4	6.17	2.71	3.1	8.87
34	12	"Collusion"	January 20, 2013	1.7/4	5.75	2.64	2.7	8.38
35	13	"Union"	February 10, 2013	1.4/3	5.20	2.60	2.5	7.80
36	14	"Sacrifice"	February 17, 2013	1.8/4	5.99	2.49	2.8	8.48
37	15	"Retribution"	March 10, 2013	2.0/5	6.90	2.31	2.9	9.27
38	16	"Illumination"	March 17, 2013	1.8/5	6.57	2.07	2.6	8.65
39	17	"Victory"	March 24, 2013	1.8/4	6.31	2.18	2.7	8.49
40	18	"Masquerade"	March 31, 2013	1.5/3	5.49	—N/a	—N/a	—N/a
41	19	"Identity"	April 28, 2013	1.7/4	6.05	—N/a	—N/a	—N/a
42	20	"Engagement"	May 5, 2013	1.8/5	6.28	—N/a	—N/a	—N/a
43	21	"Truth, Part 1"	May 12, 2013	1.7/5	6.12	—N/a	—N/a	—N/a
44	22	"Truth, Part 2"	May 12, 2013	1.7/5	6.12	—N/a	—N/a	—N/a

Season 2 (Live+7)
