= Karl Stefanovic =

Australian television presenter and journalist (born 1974)

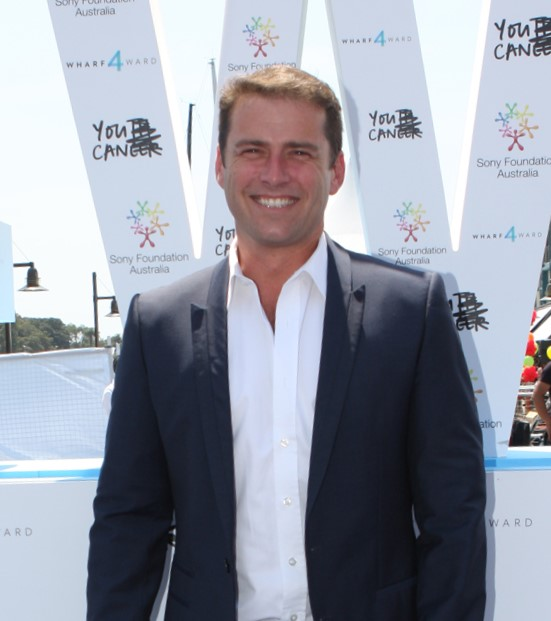
- Stefanovic in 2012
- Born: 12 August 1974 (age 52); Darlinghurst, New South Wales, Australia
- Education: Queensland University of Technology (BA)
- Occupations: Television presenter, journalist
- Years active: 1994−present
- Notable credits: Today; Nine News
- Spouses: Cassandra Thorburn (m. 1995; div. 2017) Jasmine Yarbrough (m. 2018)
- Children: 4
- Relatives: Peter Stefanovic (brother)

Karl Stefanovic (born 12 August 1974) is an Australian podcaster and former television presenter and journalist. He previously co‑hosted the Nine Network’s breakfast program Today and worked as a reporter for 60 Minutes.

In January 2026, he launched a podcast independent of the network, titled The Karl Stefanovic Show. After he published an episode on 23 June 2026 in which he interviewed a far-right activist, the Nine Network negotiated terms for his departure.

== Early life and education ==
Stefanovic was born on 12 August 1974 in the inner-Sydney suburb of Darlinghurst, Australia to a Serbian-German father and an Australian mother. He was raised in Capalaba, Queensland.

He was educated at St Augustines College (Cairns), the Anglican Church Grammar School, and the Queensland University of Technology, where he graduated with a degree in journalism in 1994.

== Career ==
After graduation, Stefanovic was unable to secure a cadetship in journalism. At his father's suggestion, he auditioned for NIDA but did not make the final cut despite making it through a few rounds of auditions. Although he was encouraged to re-apply for the following year, he took up a job offer from WIN Television in Rockhampton instead.

In 1994, he began working for WIN in Rockhampton and Cairns as a cadet reporter.

In 1996, Stefanovic took up a position with TVNZ as a reporter for One Network News in New Zealand. In 1998, Stefanovic returned to Australia with a job reporting and presenting for Ten News in Brisbane, and also acted as a fill-in news presenter for Ron Wilson in Sydney.

=== Nine Network ===
In 2000, Stefanovic moved to the Nine Network as a reporter and back-up presenter for Nine News in Brisbane. He received a Queensland Media Award for Best News Coverage for his report on the Childers backpacker hostel fire in 2000. His reports on the 2001 Warragamba bushfires from Sussex Inlet in January 2002 led to his appointment to Nine's Sydney newsroom, and he was involved in the coverage of the 2003 Canberra bushfires.

In February 2005, Stefanovic replaced Today host Steve Liebmann. He has been a fill-in host on A Current Affair for Tracy Grimshaw. In 2006, he participated in the Nine Network reality television show Torvill and Dean's Dancing on Ice. He eventually made it to the grand final of the show, but was beaten by Jake Wall by a viewer poll. In 2008, Stefanovic took over as host of Nine Network's Carols by Candlelight with Lisa Wilkinson replacing longtime host Ray Martin. He continued to host Carols by Candlelight until 2012, when he was replaced by David Campbell.

In 2011, along with his hosting role at Today, Stefanovic was a contributing reporter on 60 Minutes. He also hosted a Sunday evening edition of A Current Affair (ACA Sunday).

In December 2011, he was a crew member aboard racing supermaxi yacht Investec LOYAL when it won line honours in the 2011 Sydney to Hobart Yacht Race. Stefanovic hosted the Nine Network's evening reports on the 2012 London Olympics. In December 2013, he was a crew member aboard supermaxi yacht Perpetual Loyal in the 2013 Sydney to Hobart Yacht Race, with his other celebrity crew members, Larry Emdur, Guillaume Brahimi, Tom Slingsby, Phil Waugh and Jude Bolton.

In October 2015, Stefanovic hosted the television panel show The Verdict on the Nine Network. The weekly show mixed elements of successful programs The Project and Q&A but courted controversy with its line-up of panelists.

In July 2017, Stefanovic began hosting This Time Next Year on the Nine Network.

In December 2018, it was announced that Stefanovic would not be returning as a co-host of Today in 2019.

In November 2019, the Nine Network announced that Stefanovic would be returning to Today as co-host from January 2020 alongside Weekend Today co-host and 60 Minutes reporter Allison Langdon.

In June 2020, Stefanovic celebrated 20 years with the Nine Network. His contract is due to end in December 2026.

On 24 June 2026, The Sydney Morning Herald reported that Stefanovic was involved in negotiations with the Nine Network to leave the network following an interview on his podcast (which is independent of the network) with British far-right activist Tommy Robinson.

On 26 June 2026, the Nine Network confirmed that Stefanovic would leave the network "immediately".

=== 2GB ===
In June 2019, it was announced that Stefanovic would become a regular contributor on 2GB.

=== Podcast ===
In January 2026, Stefanovic launched The Karl Stefanovic Show, a weekly podcast featuring interviews, commentary, and discussions on current events and popular culture. His inaugural guest, in the first episode released on 25 January, was One Nation leader Pauline Hanson. In May 2026, it was reported that his podcast was commercially successful, and that he would be sought after as a radio broadcaster after his contract with Nine ended in December 2026.

The podcast is independent of the Nine Network. In an episode published on 23 June 2026, Stefanovic talks to British far-right activist Tommy Robinson, who criticises Islam, multiculturalism and laws that criminalise hate speech. At the end of the podcast, Stefanovic said that he admired Robinson's "tenacity" and "courage". On 24 June, the podcast was taken offline, and executives at Nine announced that they were reviewing statements made in the episode as well as comments he had made in support of Ben Roberts-Smith. In the wake of the Robinson interview, it was reported by The Sydney Morning Herald (which is owned by Nine) that the company was negotiating terms for Stefanovic to leave the network. In the meantime, Pauline Hanson had posted the whole episode online, calling Stefanovic her "good friend".

=== The Long Weekend ===
In May 2026, ARN Media and Nine Entertainment announced that Stefanovic would be joining Eddie McGuire to host a show titled The Long Weekend distributed on streaming platforms including iHeart, 9Now and Stan, and broadcast on the Gold Network from 19 June. The show was fast-tracked to launch on 12 June.

On 25 June 2026, McGuire stated that he was doubtful Stefanovic would join him on The Long Weekend due to an ongoing saga related to his podcast interview with British far-right activist Tommy Robinson.

On 1 July, Stefanovic was removed from The Long Weekend.

== Personal life ==
Stefanovic met journalist Cassandra Thorburn at a party in Rockhampton in 1995. They married and have three children together. In September 2016, it was revealed that Stefanovic had separated from his wife after 21 years and their divorce was finalised in October 2017.

In February 2018, Stefanovic made public his engagement to Jasmine Yarbrough. He married Yarbrough in December 2018 at a ceremony in Mexico. They have one child together.

Stefanovic's younger brother, Peter Stefanovic, is a presenter at Sky News Australia, as of April 2026.

In July 2016, Stefanovic attracted criticism from the LGBT community after using the word "tranny" and making a number of jokes deemed transphobic during a segment on Today. On 29 July 2016, a day after the segment, he made a public apology on the show, stating that "I was an ignorant tool" and stated that he was informed of how offensive the term was considered.

He was later nominated for an ACON LGBTI award for his honest apology, and has gone on to be an outspoken advocate of the queer community. In 2017, Stefanovic spoke out against the conservative government putting obstacles in the way of passing same-sex marriage legislation, condemning the government for turning the issue into a "political football". He also debated Anglican minister Michael Jensen on the topic during a live interview, arguing for a 'yes' vote on the 2017 marriage equality plebiscite.

In January 2023, Stefanovic was involved in a public fight with former Australian cricket captain Michael Clarke in Noosa, which also involved their partners. In the video, Stefanovic's sister-in-law Jade Yarbrough accuses Michael Clarke of being unfaithful and cheating on her, prompting Clarke to lash out at Stefanovic. It has been reported that Stefanovic and Clarke are no longer friends.

== Television shows and film appearances ==
Year	Title	Role	Notes
2023	Caught (2023 TV series)	Himself	TV series
2016	Independence Day: Resurgence	Himself – Reporter	Movie (scene cut)
2012	Beaconsfield	Himself	TV movie
2012	Great Barrier Reef	Himself – Presenter	3 episodes
2011	The Jesters	Himself	Go for Gold (#2.8)
2010, 2017, 2020	A Current Affair	Himself – Host/Reporter	
2009	Australia's Funniest Home Videos	Himself	20 Year Special (#20.8)
2008	Hole in the Wall	Himself – Brains Team Captain	Brains vs. Brawn (#1.6)
2007	A Current Affair	Himself – Fill-in Host	Episode dated 27 August 2007
2007	20 to 1	Himself	50 to 01: Great Movie One Liners (#4.10)
2007	Temptation	Himself – Contestant	2 episodes
2006	Torvill & Dean's Dancing on Ice	Himself	8 episodes
2006	Bert's Family Feud	Himself – Team Captain	3 episodes
2005	The Price Is Right	Himself	Episode dated 24 October 2005
2005–2018, 2020–2026	Today	Host	

== Awards ==
At the 2011 Logie Awards, Stefanovic won two awards: the Gold Logie for Most Popular Personality, and the Silver Logie for Most Popular Presenter.

== Suit incident ==
On 15 November 2014, Stefanovic revealed in an interview with Fairfax Media that he had been wearing the same suit on-air every day for a year, "except for a couple of times because of circumstance", in an act he said was an experiment in exposing sexism. He said that, while his female colleagues receive regular criticism for whatever they wear, nobody noticed his outfit the whole time. He did, however, vary his ties and shirts more regularly than his suit.

Awards and achievements
Preceded by Ray Meagher	Gold Logie Award; Most Popular Personality on Australian Television; 2011 for Today	Succeeded by Hamish Blake
Preceded by Shaun Micallef	Logie Award; Most Popular TV Presenter; 2011 for Today	Succeeded by Adam Hills
