= The Verdict (Australian TV program) =

- Presented by: Karl Stefanovic
- Opening theme: "Shut Up and Dance" by Walk the Moon
- Ending theme: "Shut Up and Dance" by Walk the Moon (instrumental)
- Country of origin: Australia
- Original language: English
- No. of seasons: 1
- No. of episodes: 8

Production
- Running time: Approximately 60 minutes (with advertisements)

Original release
- Network: Nine Network
- Release: 8 October – 25 November 2015

The Verdict was an Australian television panel discussion program on the Nine Network, hosted by news journalist and Today Show host, Karl Stefanovic, which premiered on 8 October 2015.

A pilot for the series was ordered by the Nine Network in August 2015, to be filmed the following month. The series was green-lit on 14 September 2015 for 8 episodes to air on Sundays at 9:30pm from 11 October 2015. However, the series was moved prior to launch to the Thursday 8:30pm timeslot starting from 8 October 2015. In addition, it was announced the network had only committed to 5 episodes.

On 28 October 2015, the series was renewed for a second season, which was set to air in 2016, but the series has since been cancelled.

== Format ==
The Verdict has been modelled on a mixture of Q&A and The Project, and features a rotating panel of guest. They discuss hot-button issues in front of a live audience. The panel give fielding opinions from the studio audience, while viewers at home can vote on weekly topics. Host Karl Stefanovic injects his own opinion into the show, something he has been doing increasingly while hosting Today.

== Episodes ==
=== Season 1 ===
| Episode | Date | Host | Panellists | Viewers (millions) |
| 1 | 8 October 2015 | Karl Stefanovic | Mark Latham, Senator Jacqui Lambie, Sandy Rae, Campbell Brown, Jamila Rizvi, Anne Anderson, Dr Anne Aly | 0.522 |
Topics included: The Sydney Terror Attack, Donald Trump, Over-diagnosis of Mental Health, The Deporting of Anti-Abortionist Troy Newman
| 2 | 15 October 2015 | Karl Stefanovic | Mark Latham, Julian Burnside AO QC, Senator Jacqui Lambie, Sandy Rae, Campbell Brown, Anne Anderson, Dr Anne Aly, Miranda Tapsell | 0.396 |
Topics included: Racism in Australia, Detention Centres, The Negatives of Social Media, Gender War
| 3 | 22 October 2015 | Karl Stefanovic | Mark Latham, Tim Costello, Bob Katter, Angela Mollard, Jamila Rizvi, Campbell Brown, Sandy Rea | 0.360 |
Topics included: Early election, Ban Paparazzi on Celebrity Children, Gun Control, Ban on Pokie Machines
| 4 | 29 October 2015 | Karl Stefanovic | Mark Latham, Senator Jacqui Lambie, Peter Reith, Rachel Corbett, Campbell Brown, Sandy Rea, Miranda Devine | 0.417 |
Topics included: Political Correctness, Apology from John Howard, Kids Dropping out of School, School Teachers on Social Media
| 5 | 5 November 2015 | Karl Stefanovic | Mark Latham, Anthony Albanese, Amanda Vanstone, Indira Naidoo, Rachel Corbett, Campbell Brown, Sandy Rea | 0.387 |
Topics included: Women Equality in Sport, Teachers Role in Schools, Increases in Taxes, Tiger Woods' Scandals
| 6 | 12 November 2015 | Karl Stefanovic | Mark Latham, Pauline Hanson, Amanda Vanstone, Peter FitzSimons, Osman Faruqi, Jamila Rizvi | 0.465 |
Topics included: Legalisation of Cannabis for Recreational Use, Australia's Adoption Reform, Republic Australia, Mulitculturalism in Australia, Shark Attacks
| 7 | 19 November 2015 | Michael Usher | Mark Latham, Senator Jacqui Lambie, Osman Faruqi, Rev. Bill Crews, Rachel Corbett, Anne Henderson, Major General Jim Molan (Ret) | 0.419 |
Topics included: Australia at War, Syrian Refugees, Equality for Women in Boxing, Charlie Sheen HIV scandal
| Special - Year in Review | 25 November 2015 | Karl Stefanovic | Mark Latham, Peter FitzSimons, Amanda Vanstone, Jamila Rizvi, Campbell Brown, Rachel Corbett | 0.548 |
Top Ten Topics of the Year included: 10. Jarryd Hayne playing for the NFL; 9. Donald Trump running for President of the USA; 8. Mick Fanning's shark attack 7. Gay Marriage Campaigners; 6. Michelle Payne Melbourne Cup Win; 5. Refugee Crisis; 4. Adam Goodes being booed 3. Execution of Chan & Sukumaran; 2. Malcolm Turnbull taking out Tony Abbott as PM; 1. Islamic State
