= Sacrifice (Revenge) =

- Revenge episode
- Episode no.: Season 2 Episode 14
- Directed by: Stefan Schwartz
- Written by: Mark B. Perry and Joe Fazzio
- Original air date: February 17, 2013
- Running time: 43 min.

Guest appearances
- Margarita Levieva as Amanda Clarke/Emily Thorne; Barry Sloane as Aiden Mathis; Dilshad Vadsaria as Padma Lahari; Michael Trucco as Nate Ryan; Burn Gorman as Trask; Ed Corbin as Bull; Maggie Mae Reid as Grace; Maya Goodwin as guard

Episode chronology
← Previous "Union"	Next → "Retribution"

"Sacrifice" is the fourteenth episode of the second season of the American drama television series Revenge and the thirty-sixth episode overall. The episode originally aired on February 17, 2013, on ABC. It was directed by Stefan Schwartz and jointly written by veteran Revenge writers Mark B. Perry and Joe Fazzio.

The series revolves around Emily Thorne (portrayed by Emily VanCamp), a young woman who returns to the Hamptons after many years to exact revenge on the wealthy Grayson family, particularly matriarch Victoria Grayson (Madeleine Stowe), who framed her father for money laundering to a group of terrorists, and ruined her childhood. In this episode, the flashforward depicting a human hand on the sunken Amanda, Jack Porter's boat is addressed, revealing the identity of the body and how it came to be deceased. The previous episode ended with Nate Ryan cutting the phone line after stowing aboard the Amanda to locate an incriminating laptop threatening his business plans. In this episode, Ryan takes the newlywed Amanda and Jack Porter (Nick Wechsler) hostage, and Emily Thorne races to rescue them. The episode introduces Trask (Burn Gorman) to continue the Initiative storyline following the murder of Helen Crowley (Wendy Crewson) in the previous episode, reveals why Padma Lahari (Dilshad Vadsaria) seems to be working for them, and continues the storyline of Conrad's gubernatorial ambitions. The episode also included the death of the faux Amanda Clarke, Emily's former cellmate, who had been portrayed by Margarita Levieva, a recurring cast member since the seventh episode of the series.

"Sacrifice" received near universal acclaim from critics, with commentators hailing the episode as a return to the suspense of the first season and giving particular praise to the end scene. Many viewers had felt disappointed by the second season, finding the storylines to be confusing and unfocused. The Nielsen ratings were the highest they had been since the twelfth episode, "Collusion", aired January 20, 2013.

== Plot ==
The episode begins with a flashforward set at Block Island Sound, Rhode Island on Labor Day Weekend, in which divers find the wreckage of the Amanda. In their investigation, they discover a human arm.

A day after Jack and Amanda are married and set off on their honeymoon to Nantucket, Massachusetts, Nate Ryan reveals himself to have stowed away on the boat and he takes the couple hostage. Jack quickly realizes this is about the business deal with the Stowaway, and convinces Ryan to allow him to negotiate with Conrad over the phone. However, since Ryan cut the phone line at the end of the previous episode, they must sail closer to shore. Conrad promises to make it worth Ryan's while if he recovers the laptop in Amanda's possession (that actually belongs to Emily) and kills her.

Emily finds Ryan hiding under the deck on the Amanda in a photo that Declan Porter (Connor Paolo) took before the Amanda left. She and Nolan Ross (Gabriel Mann) identify Ryan and, realizing the Porters are in danger, set off in a boat after the Amanda.

In an attempt to win Ryan's confidence, Amanda claims she is enacting what is really Emily's plan to destroy the Graysons, and bluffs that she was using Jack (who hears the conversation below deck). Jack comes above deck and pretends to argue with Amanda while Ryan is distracted with searching for the laptop on the boat. Though they trap him below deck for a time, he eventually frees himself and inadvertently shoots Jack. Amanda releases the life raft with Jack in it, staying on the boat. She attempts to fight Ryan. She is locked inside the boat, and left with no other option, creates a hole in the hull to sink it.

Conrad (Henry Czerny) moves up the date of the family's Labor Day party, where he is scheduled to announce his gubernatorial run. While it is actually an attempt to maintain a united front following Helen Crowley's murder at Victoria's hands, Ashley Davenport (Ashley Madekwe) believes it is due to the discovery of (Emily's) laptop. Victoria and her son Daniel (Josh Bowman), whom she was protecting by killing Crowley, act out a scene in his bugged office at Grayson Global to throw the Initiative off. Victoria also places Crowley's scarf and cell phone under Amanda's bed at the Stowaway, where it is found by Trask, Crowley's replacement.

While Emily and Nolan are off to rescue Amanda, Aiden Mathis (Barry Sloane) attempts to assist Padma Lahari in probing the Initiative for information. She informs them that she can obtain Nolan's Carrion program for them, but will not do so until she has proof that her father, the leverage the Initiative has been using to force her compliance, is alive. Trask informs her that Crowley was "no longer with us," but orders her to continue her mission and sends her one of her father's fingers in a package.

Emily and Nolan locate and rescue an unconscious and wounded Jack. While Nolan races Jack to the hospital, Emily presses on, in Jack's life raft, to save Amanda. As the boat Amanda continues to fill with water, Ryan comes below deck, giving Amanda an opportunity to escape. Before he can come after her, Emily boards the boat and engages in combat with him. In the struggle, Ryan's gunshots rupture the boat's propane hose. Before he can kill Emily, Amanda shoots him with another gun, wounding him temporarily. The girls prepare to escape, though Amanda stops for a second to retrieve her necklace, which she lost in the earlier struggle. She witnesses Ryan striking a match and barely escapes the boat before it explodes.

Following the explosion, Emily searches for Amanda among the wreckage and pulls her onto the partially deflated life raft. Emily discovers that Amanda was gravely wounded in the explosion, and before her death, she makes Emily promise to take care of Jack and their son Carl, and gives Emily her necklace (which Emily originally gave to her before leaving juvenile detention. Emily mourns Amanda after her death, holding her body for as long as possible before letting her slip under the waves. The episode ends with Nolan crying out for Emily, who fires a flare gun into the air before breaking down crying.

== Production ==
Barry Sloane, who portrays Aiden Mathis is credited as a series regular from this episode onward.

Margarita Levieva knew her character would die from the beginning of the season. Having originally been scheduled to appear in seven episodes, Levieva believed the death would occur earlier, and had speculated Amanda would die in the first season. She described the shooting of the final scene as "difficult and draining" due to the water and stated that in the end "they gave me an amazing death — saving Jack and Emily before dying in her arms. I couldn't have asked for anything better." As a parting gift, Kelley presented Levieva with the tire iron that Amanda used to kill Frank Stevens (Max Martini) in her first appearance.

== Reception ==
=== Ratings ===
In its original American broadcast, "Sacrifice" was watched by 5.99 million viewers and received a 1.8 rating/4% share, the largest audience since the second season's twelfth episode.

=== Critical reception ===
"Sacrifice" received universal acclaim from critics, with particular praise going toward the end scene. Miranda Wicker of TVFanatic gave Sacrifice a perfect score of 5 out of 5 stars, calling it "easily the best episode of the season" and especially praising the end scene, stating that she was excited to see Emily get back on track. Drusila Moorhouse of TV.com called the episode "bold, satisfying and shocking" and Amanda's death "melodramatic perfection," though she said she would not miss Amanda. Tara Fowler of Entertainment Weekly said that she was sad to see Amanda go despite disliking the character, and reflected that VanCamp's crying made her cry as well. Carrie Raisler of The A.V. Club gave "Sacrifice" a B-rating and stated that while she was excited to see Emily refocus her revenge, she was disappointed that it failed to "bring everything from the beginning of the season together and make it all seem like it had a bigger purpose" as she had hoped.
