= Sacrifice (Saxon album) =

- Cover art by Paul R. Gregory

Studio album by Saxon
- Released: 1 March 2013
- Recorded: LS Studios, Yorkshire, England
- Genre: Heavy metal
- Length: 39:28
- Label: UDR
- Producers: Biff Byford, Andy Sneap

Saxon chronology
Call to Arms (2011)	Sacrifice (2013)	Battering Ram (2015)

Sacrifice is the twentieth studio album by British heavy metal band Saxon. It was released on 1 March 2013 in Europe, 4 March in the United Kingdom and 26 March in the United States.

== Background and production ==
In late January 2012, drummer Nigel Glockler revealed on Facebook that the band was getting ready to write a followup to the previous year's Call to Arms. About a month later Glockler revealed, again via Facebook, that he and guitarist Doug Scarratt were convening in Glockler's home studio to write before a band meeting in March.

On 30 March 2012, vocalist Biff Byford issued an update stating that the band have a few ideas, and that he had started writing and arranging melodies. Additionally, in July 2012, two short videos were released via YouTube that show band members jamming in the studio.

In mid-August, the band released an update regarding the album. It was revealed that only a few vocals and other small things had yet to be completed. It was also announced that the album would most likely be produced by Andy Sneap. By the end of August, it was announced that the recording had been completed, and Andy Sneap was getting ready to mix the record. By October, the mixing process had been completed.

On 30 October 2012, the band had announced, via their official website, the UK leg of the Sacrifice World Tour which would support the new album, whose title was revealed to be Sacrifice.

The track listing and album artwork was announced on 15 November 2012.

== Release and promotion ==
The album was originally due to be released in several formats starting on 22 February, but due to production issues, the date was pushed back one week to 1 March. The album was released as a CD, deluxe edition, which included a bonus CD of re-recorded versions of older Saxon songs, and a picture disc. In addition, the iTunes release featured an exclusive bonus track, Luck of the Draw.

A world tour followed the album's release. The tour started in the US, and involved an appearance on the Monsters of Rock cruise, followed by South American dates. A UK tour followed in April, and European dates followed, including a headlining appearance at the Bang Your Head!!! festival in Germany and an appearance at France's Hellfest.

To help with promotion for the album, a music video for the album's title track was released on 25 February 2013.

== Reception ==
Professional ratings
Review scores
Source	Rating
Blabbermouth.net	8/10 stars
BW&BK	8/10 stars
Jukebox:Metal	4/5 stars
Record Collector	4/5 stars

Mark Gromen, reviewing Sacrifice for Brave Words and Bloody Knuckles contrasted the album with its predecessor by calling the effort more metal than 2011's Call to Arms. Gromen noted that the band had increased the intensity of their songwriting and that the guitars were heavier and faster. He gave the album an 8/10 rating.

Sacrifice was also positively reviewed by Blabbermouth.net, who granted a score of 8/10.

== Track listing ==
No.	Title	Writer(s)	Length
1.	"Procession"	Saxon	1:45
2.	"Sacrifice"	Saxon/Biff Byford	3:58
3.	"Made in Belfast"	Saxon/Biff Byford	4:34
4.	"Warriors of the Road"	Saxon/Biff Byford	3:34
5.	"Guardians of the Tomb"	Saxon/Biff Byford	4:47
6.	"Stand up and Fight"	Saxon/Biff Byford	4:02
7.	"Walking the Steel"	Saxon/Biff Byford	4:24
8.	"Night of the Wolf"	Saxon/Biff Byford	4:20
9.	"Wheels of Terror"	Saxon/Biff Byford	4:23
10.	"Standing in a Queue"	Saxon/Biff Byford	3:36
Total length:			39:28

iTunes bonus track
No.	Title	Length
11.	"Luck of the Draw"	3:20

Bonus disc
No.	Title	Writer(s)	Length
1.	"Crusader" (Orchestrated version; original version released on Crusader)	Saxon	6:42
2.	"Just Let Me Rock" (Re-recorded version; original version released on Crusader)	Saxon	3:40
3.	"Requiem" (Acoustic version; original version released on Solid Ball of Rock)	Byford, Oliver, Carter, Glockler	3:31
4.	"Frozen Rainbow" (Acoustic version; original version released on Saxon)	Byford, Quinn, Graham Oliver, Steve Dawson, Pete Gill	4:05
5.	"Forever Free" (Re-recorded version; original version released on Forever Free)	Byford, Oliver, Quinn	4:48

== Personnel ==
Saxon

- Biff Byford – lead vocals
- Paul Quinn – guitars
- Doug Scarratt – guitars
- Nibbs Carter – bass guitar
- Nigel Glockler – drums

Production

- Andy Sneap – producer, mixing
- Paul Raymond Gregory – album artwork

== Charts ==
Chart (2013)	Peak position
Austrian Albums (Ö3 Austria)	54
Belgian Albums (Ultratop Flanders)	117
Belgian Albums (Ultratop Wallonia)	70
Finnish Albums (Suomen virallinen lista)	31
French Albums (SNEP)	82
German Albums (Offizielle Top 100)	14
Scottish Albums (Official Charts)	83
Swedish Albums (Sverigetopplistan)	15
Swiss Albums (Schweizer Hitparade)	51
UK Albums (Official Charts)	87
UK Rock & Metal Albums (Official Charts)	4
