= Phil Abramson =

American set decorator

- Born: March 13, 1933; Omaha, Nebraska
- Died: July 5, 1987 (aged 54); Los Angeles, California
- Occupation: Set decorator
- Years active: 1968-1987

Phil Abramson (March 13, 1933 – July 5, 1987) was an American set decorator. He was nominated for an Academy Award in the category Best Art Direction for the film Close Encounters of the Third Kind.

== Selected filmography ==
- Close Encounters of the Third Kind (1977)
