= The Sacrifice (2005 film) =

The Sacrifice is an independent film by Jamie Fessenden that was first shown at Gaylaxicon in 2005. It is a horror/psychological thriller that centers on a high school boy who becomes embroiled in an occult mystery in a quiet New Hampshire town.

The film has been described as a "horror film for gays, goths and geeks".

== Production ==
The film was produced with a very low budget.
