= Cassandra Thorburn =

Australian children's author (born 1971)

- Born: 16 March 1971 (age 55); Sydney, New South Wales, Australia
- Occupation: Author
- Spouse: Karl Stefanovic (m. 1995; div. 2017)
- Children: 3

Cassandra Thorburn (born 16 March 1971) is an Australian children's author.

== Early life ==
Thorburn's father was regional Victorian media personality and councillor Max Thorburn, who died at the age of 72 on 18 October 2018.

== Career ==
In 2018, Thorburn published a children's book that she and her friend Cara Campbell co-authored called Leo Lion's Big Bed!.

Thorburn lists Australian children's author Mem Fox as an inspiration, who was one of Thorburn's tutors at university.

As a journalist and television producer, Thorburn worked in Australia, New Zealand and the United States.

Thorburn was one of the celebrities competing on Network 10 reality show Dancing with the Stars in 2019 where she was partnered up with Marco De Angelis. She was third to be eliminated from the competition.

== Personal life ==
Until their divorce in 2016, Thorburn had been married to Australian television presenter Karl Stefanovic for 21 years. They had met in 1995 while they were both working as journalists in Rockhampton. Together, they have three children.

Thorburn and Stefanovic's divorce, and Stefanovic's new relationship with, and subsequent marriage to, Jasmine Yarbrough attracted widespread coverage in the Australian tabloid media. Thorburn has been critical of the media coverage of her divorce from Stefanovic, and accused a paparazzi photographer of following her to Hamilton Island, and following her mother in Mildura. She also accused tabloid magazine New Idea of publishing a fake interview, which Thorburn said never occurred.
