= Giggle and Hoot =

Australian children's television program

- Logo
- Starring: Jimmy Rees; Damian Wagland
- Country of origin: Australia
- Original language: English
- No. of seasons: 11

Production
- Executive producer: Jan Stradling
- Production location: Australian Broadcasting Corporation Studios

Original release
- Network: ABC Kids
- Release: 4 December 2009 – 28 February 2020

Related
- Hoot Hoot Go!

Giggle and Hoot is an Australian children's television "wrap-around" program block that aired on the ABC Kids channel. The series was produced from 2009 to 2019, with the final episodes airing in 2020, and depicted the adventures of Jimmy Giggle (played by Jimmy Rees) and his best friend, Hoot the Owl (played by Damian Wagland). It also aired on ABC from 2009 to 2011. In later seasons, they were joined by a second owl called Hootabelle (played by Jemma Armstrong) along with other friends and their toys.

== Characters ==
=== Jimmy Giggle ===
In the program, Jimmy Giggle is shown to enjoy mending objects and a talent for creating new things out of everyday items; for instance, he used a bath to make a bed, and the walls of his house were sewn and buttoned together. He also has a magic button that he relies on which never works. A dinosaur named Giggleosaurus is Jimmy Giggle's favourite toy. He plays several musical instruments, including the ukulele, double bass, baritone saxophone, piano, and guitar.

=== Hoot the Owl ===
Hoot the Owl is Jimmy Giggle's best friend. Although owls are traditionally nocturnal, the show depicts him favouring the daytime, which Hoot finds "very exciting". However, due to his nocturnality, he is prone to falling asleep. Hoot lives in a chest of drawers that he fashioned into his own personal apartment. Hoot plays the harmonica and triangle. He also uses a cloudier to make clouds appear.

Hoot's interests include "owl" snacks, the colour blue, "owl" naps, hootball (a portmanteau of "hoot" and "football") and his favourite toy Mini-Hoot. He and Jimmy Giggle enjoy playing, singing, and spending time together. They also play dress-up and have been, for example, seen dressed up as astronauts and pirates.

==== Hoot's Night Watch ====
At the end of each episode, a sequence called the "Night Watch" plays when Hoot is "flying" across the land of Giggle and Hoot to "ensure everyone is tucked up in bed". Hootabelle helps him by lighting up the stars with her "Star Twinkler" so he can see his way in the "Nighty Night" sky. Hoot and Hootabelle often meet up after The Night Watch to fly and play everywhere in the land of Giggle and Hoot.

=== Hootabelle ===
Later seasons include a purple female owl named Hootabelle. She was created as a companion and close friend for Hoot. In the series, she lives in a "Purple Button Tree" and has a toy cat called Gigglepaws, who intimidates Hoot as he is terrified of cats. Hootabelle assures him that Gigglepaws is a "friendly" cat. She also has a toy butterfly called Giggle Wings who likes flying around the Giggle and Hoot house. Hootabelle uses her "Star Twinkler" to make the night sky's stars light up and her "Bookifier" to make random books appear from her library. She often visits the Giggle and Hoot house for an "Owl Pal Play Date".

She enjoys the colour purple, books, butterflies, owl snacks, worm-flavoured milkshakes, and singing.

=== Giggleosaurus, Mini-Hoot, and Gigglepaws ===
Jimmy Giggle, Hoot and Hootabelle each have a favourite toy. Giggleosaurus the dinosaur is Jimmy Giggle's favourite; Mini-Hoot belongs to Hoot, and Hootabelle has a toy cat called Gigglepaws.

Giggleosaurus, Mini-Hoot and Gigglepaws are treated and spoken to as real characters by Jimmy Giggle and the owls and are often used while playing. They are brought to life in animated form through various songs in the show, such as "Go Giggleosaurus," "On A Mini-Adventure," and "Hoot! Hoot! It's A Lovely Day."

=== Additional characters ===
Additional puppet characters that have appeared on the show include:

- Hootoclaws: An owl version of Santa Claus that uses his "Christmasafier" to bring Christmas spirit to the Land of Giggle and Hoot during the Christmas holidays.
- Cosmo Carrot, Bessie Broccoli and Tommy Tomato: The singing vegetables of the Gigglearium.
- Pirate Hootbeard: A legendary owl pirate captain who sails the Giggle Seas and lives on Button Island with his treasured toy, Pirate Mini-Hootbeard. Whenever he becomes upset he loses his signature "Yarr!". He debuted in the one hour special The Legend of Pirate Hootbeard, alongside three live-action and graphic effects clips, "The Piratey Pirate Hootbeard", "Hootastic Seas" and "Flying Giggle Ship" which follow him and his "pirate pals". When he goes on an adventure he uses his "Treasureafier" to make things "piratey" in the land of Giggle and Hoot.
- Giggle Fangs: A "friendly" bat. He lives at the edge of the Giggle Forest in the Batty Lair with his favourite toys, Giggle Bug and Mini-Fangella. He has "Super Sonic Bat Hearing" and has a strong liking of "bat naps" in his upside-down bed. Other things he likes include the colour grey, quietness, surprising his friends (with Jimmy Giggle getting reminded that he and Mini-Fangella are "friendly" bats) and making things batty with his "Bat Bolt".
- Hootpa: An elderly, bearded owl who is Hoot's grandfather and Pirate Hootbeard's brother. He likes taking naps on comfy cushions, having tea parties with his friends, using his "Pa Wand" to help people, and sliding around on his Super Slippers. He has a toy puppy named Giggle Bones who is female and uses her "super sniffy" nose to find things.
- Hootagadget: An intelligent, red female owl who is a close friend to Hootabelle and Hootly. She lives in the Gadget Cubby with her toy dragon Giggle Spikey and occasionally goes on missions with her friends. Gadgets that she uses include a "Rainbowifier", "Wing Watches", "Skyboards," "Hootoheadsets", a "Gadget Computer" which she uses to code and fix broken tools, and her "Five Steps to Bed Detector" to make sure everyone in the Land of Giggle and Hoot has completed them.

== Format ==
=== The Day Time Block ===
The Day Time Block is between 7–9 am and 1:45–2:40 pm, and there are a number of music video clips shown in this time, including:

- Giggle Fangs – An animated video clip created by Yukfoo about Giggle Fangs and his assistant Giggle Bug. The song was composed in collaboration with the ABC by indie Australian artist David McCormack and Sonar Music.
- Hootball – "Hootball" is an animated clip created by the ABC in collaboration with a Sydney-based animation company, Robot Tuesday, that follows Hoot and Hootabelle's ball game up in the "cloudosphere", with the toys cheering them on. The song was composed in collaboration with the ABC by Bridget Turner.
- Time to Play – An animated clip which follows Hoot, Hootabelle, Giggle Fangs, and Hootagadget preparing and going on an "Owl Pal Playdate" together.
- Owl Pals – Hoot, Hootabelle, and their friends chat with kids about certain topics. It started in the 2018 Christmas block and moved to normal blocks in 2019.
- Cloud Bouncing – "Cloud Bouncing" is a live-action and graphic-effects video clip where Hoot and Hootabelle bounce around the clouds together. Their favourite toys, Giggleosaurus, Giggle Paws, and Mini-Hoot make cameo appearances in the background. It is reworked as "Star Bouncing" during the Goodnight Hour. The song was composed by Sean Peter, Clare Gerber, and Bryson Hall.
- The Giggle Galaxy – The "Giggle Galaxy" is an animated clip created by the ABC in collaboration with Robot Tuesday, which follows Astro Jimmy Giggle, Astro Hoot, and Astro Hootabelle as they catch the Giggle Rocket into Giggle Space and fly around the button planets wearing their Giggle Space Boots. The animation is played both in the morning and evening blocks. The song was composed in collaboration with the ABC by Australian artist Terry Mann.
- Hoot! Hoot! It's a Lovely Day – An animated clip created by the ABC in collaboration with the Sydney-based animation company, Zspace, that follows Hoot and Hootabelle as they fly around the land of Giggle and Hoot together. They play "Hoot and Seek" with Gigglepaws in the Giggle Garden, go down a large water slide, fly through a field of giant dandelions, draw pictures in the clouds, and fly through a button rainbow. The song was composed in collaboration with the ABC by Australian indie band, Achoo! Bless You (Ashleigh Steel and Ross James Tipper).
- Let's Fly – An animated clip which follows Hootabelle and Hootagadget having fun in the land of Giggle and Hoot together. They go rainbow sliding on their "skyboards" and build a spaceship to fly into the Giggle Galaxy.
- On A Mini-Adventure – On A Mini-Adventure is an animated clip created by the ABC in collaboration with Robot Tuesday. It follows the adventures of Mini-Hoot and Giggleosaurus. The toys travel together on a bicycle that transforms into a magic flying hot-air balloon picnic, then into a paper plane that zips around before transforming into a submarine. They take a photo of themselves which ends on a scrapbook image. The song was composed by Australian artists Paul Kingston and Cain Horton in collaboration with the ABC.
- The Funky Owl – "The Funky Owl" is Hoot's favourite "funky bird" song and dance. The dance consists of dancers moving their arms up and down. In the clip Jimmy Giggle plays an oversized bass guitar. They both perform the song on an animated stage with a pair of dancing speakers. It is composed by Sean Peter and the ABC.
- Go Giggleosaurus! – "Go Giggleosaurus!" is an animated video clip that was created by the ABC in collaboration with Zspace. It follows Jimmy Giggle's favourite toy dinosaur as he explores an animated world where he slides down a keyboard mountain, roller-skates up a volcano then rides a button board. . Song produced and sung by Tim Derricourt with Clare Gerber.
- The Gigglemobile – Jimmy Giggle and Hoot fly around the land of Giggle and Hoot in their Gigglemobile, which is a cardboard automobile that is stitched and buttoned together. It is able to drive on land, go underwater, and fly. The song was composed by Darren Lane and Wade Jackson in collaboration with the ABC.
- My Best Friend – This live-action series celebrates friends and always centers around a pair or a group of children who are best friends. They dance to the song and say why they are "best friends" as they do some of their favourite things around the playground. The song was composed by Kyle Burtland and Clare Gerber.
- Super Giggle and Super Hoot – This segment is about celebrating "everything – every little thing can be a super thing!" Jimmy Giggle and Hoot are faced with a little problem that is solved and overcome when they turn into superheroes. In later episodes Hootabelle joins in to help the problems. The song was composed by Sean Peter and the ABC.
- Little Aussie Champs – Little Aussie Champs is a live action segment in the early seasons about celebrating kids achievements in the playground. Jimmy Giggle and Hoot commentate a different activity taking place in the playground every week. It always signed off with "Play safe, have fun! 'Cos you're number one!"
- Hoot's Birdwatching Club – These segments from the early seasons shows Hoot and Jimmy looking for birds only to find some sent by their friends.
- Giggle Art Song – This live-action series is an extension of "The Giggle Gallery", with groups of children from preschools coming together to create art. Each segment focuses on one thing that they create. The song was composed by Fergus Brown with Clare Gerber.

==== The Gigglearium ====
When Jimmy Giggle, Hoot and Hootabelle press a button on the side of their vegetable box it "magically" transforms into "The Gigglearium" – a musical theatre where three vegetables – Tommy Tomato (Hamish Fletcher/Nicholas Richard), Bessie Broccoli (Naomi Young) and Cosmo Carrot (James Rees) – come to life and sing songs. Songs are composed by Sean Peter in collaboration with the ABC. The vegetables sing seven songs:

- "The Gigglearium Slow Song" – Tommy Tomato
- "The Gigglearium Solo Song" – Bessie Broccoli
- "The Gigglearium Country Song" – Cosmo Carrot
- "The Gigglearium Opera Song" – Bessie Broccoli
- "The Gigglearium Loud Song" – Cosmo Carrot
- "The Gigglearium Rhyme Song" – All
- "The Gigglearium Disco Song" – All

==== The Giggle Gallery ====
Within Giggle and Hoot is a daily segment called "The Giggle Gallery". The segment celebrates art that was created and sent to the ABC from pre-school children around Australia. The pictures are hung as though they are in an art gallery. Jimmy Giggle and Hoot go through and talk about the 'wonderful things' that make up each artwork. In this section, Hoot is not able to restrain himself when there is blue in the compilation as it is his favourite colour.

=== The Goodnight Hour ===
The Goodnight Hour is about winding down in the evening and helps pre-schoolers maintain a bedtime routine. The Goodnight Hour screens 5:15–7:25 pm from Monday to Saturday and 6–7:25 pm Sunday and has a number of songs, including:

- My Batty Lair – A live-action video clip, swing style, about Giggle Fangs and his deep love of the Batty Lair. Composed by Sean Peter in collaboration with the ABC.
- 5 Steps to Bed – Jimmy Giggle, Hoot, Hootabelle and Hootogadget go through the "very important 5 Steps To Bed", big band style. They sing about brushing one's teeth, putting the pyjamas on, a story or a sleepy time song, cuddling toys, and "saying hello to the night". Composed by Jeff Debnam and the ABC and arranged by Sean Peter.
- Beak Brush Time – Jimmy Giggle, Hoot and Hootogadget brush their teeth and beaks and explain how to get the "smiliest smile" while times using Hootogadget's Gadget Timer.
- The Giggle Galaxy – see above.
- Hey Hootabelle – An animated clip which follows Hoot and Hootabelle as they meet at Hootabelle's purple button tree and then fly around the land of Giggle and Hoot together. The song was composed and recorded by Israeli-Australian artist, Lior. The video clip was animated in collaboration with the ABC by Sydney-based post-production house, Zspace.
- The Birdbath Boogie – Hoot sings while he is bathing to prepare for The Night Watch, backed up by Jimmy Giggle on the 'chest-of-drawers-piano'. It was later rewritten as The Bird and Bat Bath Boogie which includes Giggle Fangs, Hootabelle and Pirate Hootbeard. Composed by Sean Peter and the ABC.
- On the Night Watch – Hoot sings a song about the Night Watch with Jimmy Giggle, becoming "so excited about it". Dressed up in formal attire, they sing in the style of crooners. Music by Sean Peter and Bryson Hall.
- Sweet Dreams – An animated clip where Jimmy Giggle and Hoot fly around the skies of Giggle and Hoot together. It is introduced as being a dream that Jimmy Giggle had, and he often retells it when Hoot asks him. The video clip was animated in collaboration with the ABC by Sydney-based post-production house, Zspace. Sweet Dreams was written and recorded in collaboration with the ABC by Australian artists Paul Kingston and Cain Horton.
- Giggle Mission Time – An animated clip which follows Hoot, Hootabelle, Hootagadget, and Giggle Spikey going on a mission together. After activating the Rainbow Slide, the Giggle Agents go "rainbow sliding", skate on "skyboards", practice sneaking around in the Button Meadow and climb the Great Giggle Mountain before completing the mission by going back to the "Gadget Cubby".
- Twinklify – Every night Hootabelle lights up the stars in the land of Giggle and Hoot with her "twinklifying" wand. Music by Sean Peter and the ABC.
- Giggle and Hoot Bookworm Club – In this segment from the early series Hoot is joined by a celebrity guest to read some children's books to him.
- Hoot's Lullaby – An animated clip that always ends the Night-Time Block. It follows Hoot as he commences flight on the Night Watch, and ends with the phrase "See you in the morning! Hoot! Hoot!". The song was written and sung by Lior. The video clip was animated in collaboration with the ABC by Sydney-based post-production house, Zspace.

== Production ==
The show was produced by the Australian Broadcasting Corporation at the Ultimo Sydney studios for ABC Kids. It was announced along with the launch of ABC Me. The show is aimed at 2–6-year-old children and premiered in early 2010. The production team was:

- Jan Stradling—Executive producer
- Natalie Robinson-Hurst—Series producer
- Karin Fitzhardinge—Director and producer

In December 2019, Libbie Doherty, head of the ABC Kid's network, announced that Giggle and Hoot would end its run in early 2020.

== Cast ==
- Jimmy Rees as Jimmy Giggle
- Damian Wagland as Hoot the Owl and Giggle Fangs
- Jemma Armstrong as Hootabelle
- Mark Simpson as Pirate Hootbeard
- Stef Smith as Hootogadget
- Cam Ralph as Hootpa

== Hoot Hoot Go! ==
Hoot Hoot Go! is a spin-off show of Giggle and Hoot which stars Hoot, Hootabelle, Pirate Hootbeard and Giggle Fangs. Supporting them are new characters Hootly, a best friend of Hoot and Hootabelle, and Hootaluna and Gigglebot, who live on the moon. The series contains 26 five-minute episodes.

=== Hoot Hoot Go! episode titles ===
1. The Hootastic Choir
2. The Perfect Piratey Picnic Spot
3. Hootaluna: Moon Dancer Extraordinaire
4. The Broken Fangifier
5. Hootly Learns to Cloud Bounce
6. Pirate Mini-Hootbeard Can't Sleep
7. Hootaluna: Moon Bouncer Extraordinaire
8. The Perfect Cubby House
9. Hootaluna: Hootball Finder Extraordinaire
10. Giggle Fangs Is Too Good at Hide and Seek
11. The Piratey Party
12. Hootaluna: Singer Extraordinaire
13. Giggle Bug Goes Missing
14. Hoot's Not Ready for the Night Watch
15. Pirate Hootbeard and the Missing Star Cloud
16. Giggle Bot: The Extra Tired Moon Bot
17. A Party for Giggle Fangs
18. The Messy Button Tree
19. All the Greys of the Button Rainbow
20. Hootaluna: Sleepover Owl Extraordinaire
21. Giggle Fangs Makes the Stars Disappear
22. Happy Hoot Day
23. Pirate Hootbeard Loses His Yarr
24. The Moon Bot Dance
25. Boo Day
26. Pirate Mini-Hootbeard's Mini Treasure Hunt

== Awards ==
Year	Nominated work	Category	Award	Result	Notes	Ref.
2010	Giggle and Hoot Set	PromaxBDA World Gold Design Awards	Best Set Design	Nominated		
2010	Hoot's Lullaby	PromaxBDA World Gold Design Awards	Best Interstitial	Won		
2010	Hoot's Lullaby	PromaxBDA ANZ	Best Interstitial	Won		
2011	Sweet Dreams	PromaxBDA World Gold Design Awards	Best Music Video/Short Subject	Won		
2011	Sweet Dreams	APRA Awards	Best Original Song Composed for the Screen	Nominated		
2011	The Giggle and Hoot Christmas Special	APRA Awards	Best Music for Children's Television	Nominated		
2012	Hey Hootabelle	APRA Screen Music Awards	Best Original Song Composed for the Screen	Won		
2012	Hey Hootabelle	APRA Screen Music Awards	Best Music for Children's Television	Nominated		
2012	James Rees and Hamish Fletcher	International Kidscreen Awards	Best On-Air Host or Hosting Team	Won		
2013	Talking Hootabelle Interactive Plush	Australian Toy Association	Best Pre-school Licensed Product of the Year	Won		
2013	The Gigglearium Set	PromaxBDA Global Excellence Awards	Best Set Design	Silver		
2013	Go Giggleosaurus!	PromaxBDA ANZ	Best CG Animation	Silver		
2013	Claw Tapping Tunes	ARIA Awards	Best Children's Album	Nominated		
2013	The Gigglearium Special	APRA/AMCOS Screen Music Awards	Best Music for Children's Television	Nominated		
2013	On a Mini Adventure	APRA/AMCOS Screen Music Awards	Best Original Song Composed for the Screen	Nominated		
2013	Hoot Hoot It's a Lovely Day	AEAF Awards	Best Music Video	Nominated		
2014	The Giggle Galaxy	PromaxBDA Global Excellence Awards	Best Art Direction and Design	Nominated		
2014	The Legend of Pirate Hootbeard	IP Awareness ATOM Awards	Best Children's Television Program	Nominated		
2014	The Giggle Galaxy	APRA/AMCOS Screen Music Awards	Best Original Song Composed for the Screen	Nominated		
2015	Gigglepaws	AEAF Awards	Best Music Video	Nominated		
2015	Flying Giggle Ship	APRA/AMCOS Screen Music Awards	Best Original Song Composed for the Screen	Nominated		
2015	The Legend of Pirate Hootbeard	APRA/AMCOS Screen Music Awards	Best Music for Children's Television	Nominated		
2015	Hootastic Tunes	ARIA Awards	Best Children's Album	Nominated		
