= Jimmy Rees =

Australian actor (born 1987)

Jimmy Rees OAM
- Born: James Rees; 15 July 1987 (age 39); Melbourne, Victoria, Australia
- Occupation: Comedian
- Years active: 2009–present
- Spouse: Tori (m. 2013)
- Children: 3
- Website: jimmyrees.com.au

James Rees OAM (born 15 July 1987), known professionally as Jimmy Rees, is an Australian comedian. He is best known for playing the role of Jimmy Giggle on ABC Kids' flagship program Giggle and Hoot from 2009 to 2020.

== Personal life ==
Rees was born and grew up in Melbourne, Victoria and moved to the Central Coast of New South Wales, at age 22, to star as "Jimmy Giggle" in the ABC children's programme Giggle and Hoot (filmed in the ABC's Ultimo studios).

Rees married his long-term partner Tori in 2013 and they have three sons named Lenny, Mack and Vinny. After Rees finished up with Giggle and Hoot, they moved from the Central Coast, New South Wales to the Mornington Peninsula in Victoria.

== Career ==
Rees was the host of the Australian ABC children's program Giggle and Hoot from 2009 to 2020. In the program, Jimmy Giggle (Rees) is shown to enjoy mending objects, although he relies on a "problematic magic button" that never works. He is portrayed as having a brilliant talent in creating new things out of regular items. He also plays several musical instruments in the program, including the ukulele, double bass, baritone saxophone, piano and guitar. It was reported that Rees beat 5,000 other actors to win the role, and moved to the Central Coast from his home town in Victoria for the role.

Rees competed in the sixteenth season of the Australian version of Network 10's Dancing with the Stars in 2019, where he was partnered with Alexandra Vladimirov. Rees made it to the top 5 of the contest but withdrew from the competition when one of his infant twin sons Mack suffered complications during a routine medical procedure. During the Dancing with the Stars competition Rees scored best dancer in his renditions of the foxtrot and salsa performed to George Ezra's "Hold My Girl" and Pitbull's "I Know You Want Me (Calle Ocho)", respectively, and won the second week of the competition with his rendition of the Jive performed to Queen's "Don't Stop Me Now". Rees was also a member of the winning team "La La Land" of the group dance with fellow competitors Courtney Act, Jett Kenny and Michelle Bridges.

Rees has also starred in a number of pantomime stage productions. He has performed in Bonnie Lythgoe productions including Snow White Winter Family Musical in 2014 and Cinderella in 2016. In July 2019 Rees is scheduled to appear in a production of Jack and the beanstalk as "Silly Billy", alongside fellow Australian actors Peter Rowsthorn and Luke Joslin.

Rees has also made appearances on a number of Australian TV programs including JuicedTV in 2015 and Whovians in 2017.

In 2018, Rees was crowned King of Moomba with Chrissie Swan as Queen of Moomba.

In November 2019, Rees announced that he had decided to end his stint with Giggle and Hoot. He was quoted as saying that he had decided to move on to a different phase of his life. The show's "gruelling schedule", involving shooting for 47 weeks a year, had made it difficult for his growing family of three young children.

In 2020, he started releasing short humorous videos on TikTok and YouTube, covering topics such as parenting, packaging and the COVID-19 pandemic. His most well-known videos are those in a series called "Meanwhile in Australia", where he plays the role of political leaders such as the then-Prime Minister Scott Morrison and each state premier and territorial chief minister negotiating lockdowns, border restrictions and vaccinations. As of August 2021, the series had gained over 8 million followers on social media and 10 million fans on TikTok.

In 2023, Rees competed as a contestant on the first season of Taskmaster Australia, hosted by Tom Gleeson.

== Honours and awards ==
In the 2024 King's Birthday Honours list, Rees was appointed a Medal of the Order of Australia (OAM), "for service to the arts as an entertainer, and to the community".
