= Saxon discography =

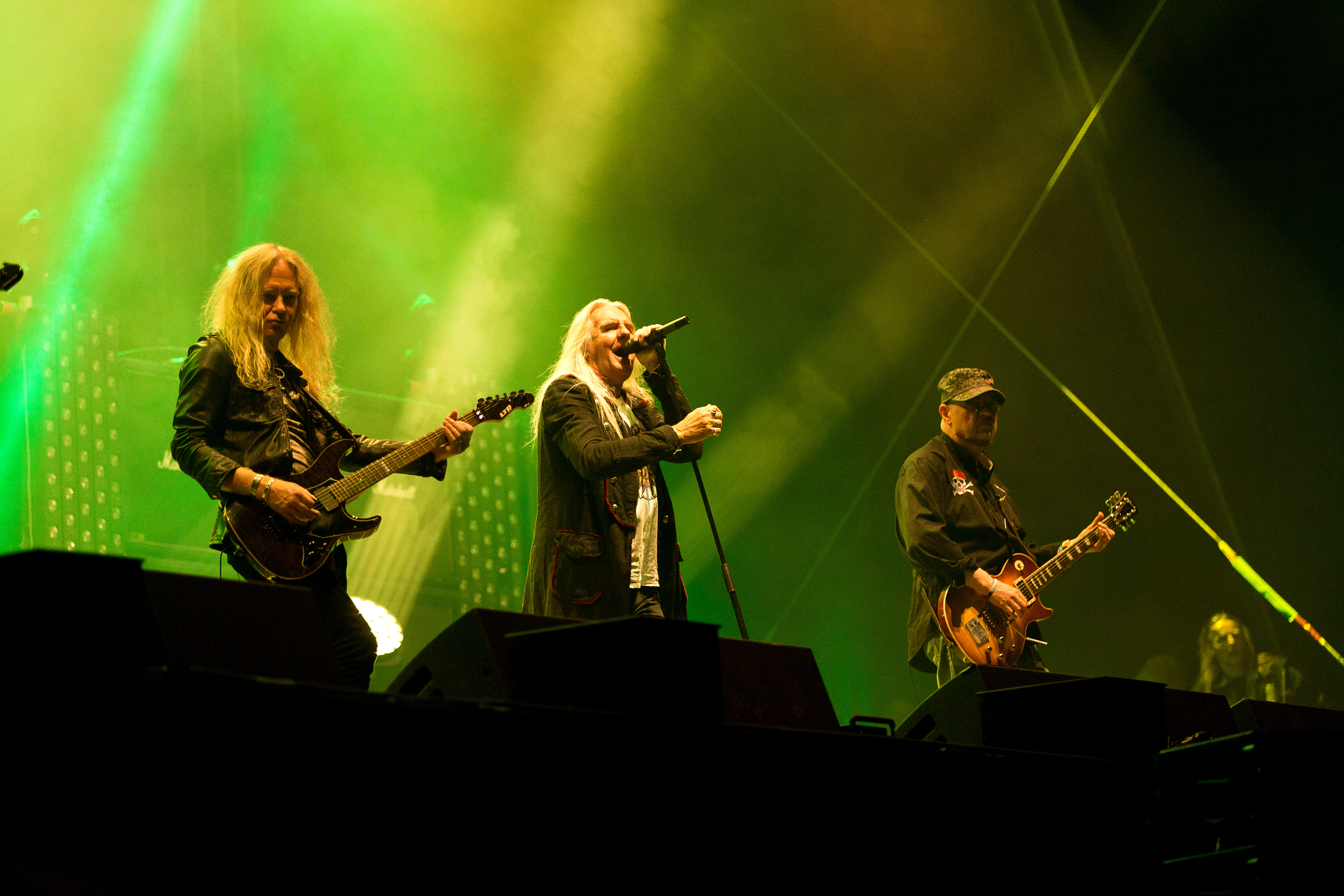
- Saxon live in 2016
- Studio albums: 24
- Live albums: 11
- Compilation albums: 11
- Video albums: 11

The following is a comprehensive discography of Saxon, a British heavy metal band.

== Albums ==
=== Studio albums ===
Title	Album details	Peak chart positions									Certifications
Title	Album details	US	AUT	FRA	GER	NLD	SWE	SWI	UK	UK Rock	Certifications
Saxon	Released: May 1979; Label: Carrere	—	—	—	—	—	—	—	—	—	
Wheels of Steel	Released: 3 April 1980; Label: Carrere	—	—	—	—	—	36	—	5	—	UK: Gold
Strong Arm of the Law	Released: 7 November 1980; Label: Carrere	—	—	15	—	—	37	—	11	—	UK: Gold
Denim and Leather	Released: 25 September 1981; Label: Carrere	—	—	19	37	39	21	—	9	—	UK: Silver
Power & the Glory	Released: March 1983; Label: Carrere	155	—	—	28	26	9	—	15	—	
Crusader	Released: 30 January 1984; Label: Carrere	174	—	—	20	16	15	26	18	—	
Innocence Is No Excuse	Released: 2 September 1985; Label: EMI	133	—	—	33	—	18	—	36	—	
Rock the Nations	Released: 15 September 1986; Label: EMI	149	—	—	44	—	26	—	34	—	
Destiny	Released: March 1988; Label: EMI	—	—	—	45	—	30	28	49	—	
Solid Ball of Rock	Released: 14 January 1991; Label: Virgin	—	—	—	23	—	—	28	—	—	
Forever Free	Released: 18 May 1992; Label: Virgin	—	—	—	58	—	—	—	—	—	
Dogs of War	Released: September 1995; Label: Virgin	—	—	—	55	—	—	43	—	—	
Unleash the Beast	Released: May 1997; Label: Virgin	—	—	—	61	—	—	—	—	—	
Metalhead	Released: 9 November 1999; Label: SPV/Steamhammer	—	—	—	40	—	—	—	—	—	
Killing Ground	Released: 25 September 2001; Label: SPV/Steamhammer	—	—	141	26	—	—	—	—	—	
Lionheart	Released: 20 September 2004; Label: SPV/Steamhammer	—	—	103	44	—	57	62	—	22	
The Inner Sanctum	Released: 5 March 2007; Label: SPV/Steamhammer	—	—	138	36	—	39	89	—	4	
Into the Labyrinth	Released: 9 January 2009; Label: SPV/Steamhammer	—	—	87	23	83	33	61	—	6	
Call to Arms	Released: 3 June 2011; Label: UDR Music	—	—	—	18	—	19	37	—	6	
Sacrifice	Released: 1 March 2013; Label: UDR Music	—	54	82	14	—	15	51	87	4	
Battering Ram	Released: 15 October 2015; Label: UDR Music	—	34	66	12	—	13	21	50	3	
Thunderbolt	Released: 2 February 2018; Label: Silver Lining Music	—	18	113	5	—	13	6	29	2	
Carpe Diem	Released: 4 February 2022; Label: Silver Lining Music	—	7	59	3	59	15	4	17	2	
Hell, Fire and Damnation	Released: 19 January 2024; Label: Silver Lining Music	—	4	27	4	59	6	4	19	2	
Gods of Thunder	Released: 22 January 2027; Label: Silver Lining Music	—	—	—	—	—	—	—	—	—	
"—" denotes releases that did not chart or were not released in that territory.

=== Cover albums ===
Title	Album details	Peak chart positions					
Title	Album details	AUT	FRA	GER	SWI	UK	UK Rock
Inspirations	Released: March 19, 2021; Label: Silver Lining Music	27	154	10	12	56	1
More Inspirations	Released: March 24, 2023; Label: Silver Lining Music	63	—	30	23	—	5
"—" denotes releases that did not chart or were not released in that territory.

=== Live albums ===
Title	Album details	Peak chart positions							Certifications
Title	Album details	FRA	GER	NLD	SWE	SWI	UK	UK Rock	Certifications
The Eagle Has Landed	Released: May 10, 1982; Label: Carrere	—	33	32	30	—	5	—	UK: Silver
Rock 'n' Roll Gypsies	Released: November 1989; Label: Roadrunner	—	—	—	—	—	—	—	
Greatest Hits Live!	Released: September 24, 1990; Label: Castle	—	—	—	—	—	—	—	
The Eagle Has Landed – Part II	Released: July 14, 1996; Label: Virgin	—	—	—	—	—	—	—	
Donnington: The Live Tracks	Released: November 4, 1997; Label: Angel Air	—	—	—	—	—	—	—	
BBC Sessions	Released: November 3, 1998; Label: EMI	—	—	—	—	—	—	—	
The Eagle Has Landed – Part III	Released: June 2, 2006; Label: Steamhammer/SPV	—	—	—	—	—	—	—	
Heavy Metal Thunder – Live: Eagles Over Wacken	Released: April 20, 2012; Label: UDR Music	—	52	—	—	—	—	—	
St. George's Day Sacrifice: Live in Manchester	Released: March 13, 2014; Label: UDR Music	—	—	—	—	—	—	27	
Let Me Feel Your Power	Released: October 7, 2016; Label: UDR Music	169	47	—	—	—	—	19	
The Vinyl Hoard	Released: October 28, 2016; Label: Demon	—	—	—	—	—	—	—	
The Eagle Has Landed 40: Live	Released: August 2, 2019; Label: Militia Guard Music	192	36	—	—	63	46	2	
"—" denotes releases that did not chart or were not released in that territory.

=== Compilation albums ===
- Strong Arm Metal (1984)
- Anthology (1988)
- Back on the Streets (1990)
- The Best of Saxon (1991)
- A Collection of Metal (1996)
- Burrn! Presents: The Best of Saxon (2000)
- Diamonds and Nuggets (2000)
- Masters of Rock: Saxon (2001)
- Heavy Metal Thunder (2002) (re-recordings)
- Coming to the Rescue (2002)
- The Very Best of Saxon (1979–1988) (2007)
- The Best of Saxon (2009)
- Saxon – The Carrere Years (1979–1984) (Box Set) (2012)
- Saxon – The EMI Years (1985–1988) (Box Set) (2012)
- Unplugged and Strung Up (2013) (orchestral + acoustic)
- The Complete Albums 1979-1988 (10-CD boxed set) (2014)
- Baptism in Fire – The Collection 1991–2009 (2016)
- Decade of the Eagle - 1979-1988 (2017)

== Videos ==
- Live (1983)
- Live Innocence! (1985)
- Greatest Hits Live! (1989)
- Power & the Glory – Video Anthology (1990)
- The Saxon Chronicles (2003)
- Live Innocence – The Power & the Glory (2003)
- To Hell and Back Again (2007)
- Saxon: Heavy Metal Thunder – Live (2010)
- Heavy Metal Thunder – Live: Eagles Over Wacken (2012)
- Warriors of the Road – The Saxon Chronicles Part II (2014)
- The Saxon Chronicles (2015)
- Let Me Feel Your Power (2016)

== Music videos ==
List of music videos
Title	Year
"Wheels Of Steel"	1980
"747 (Strangers In The Night)"	1980
"Suzie Hold On"	1980
"Strong Arm Of The Law"	1980
"Hungry Years"	1980
"Demin And Leather"	1981
"Princess Of The Night"	1981
"Never Surrender"	1981
"Nightmare"	1983
"Power And The Glory"	1983
"Just Let Me Rock"	1984
"Everybody Up"	1985
"Back On The Streets"	1985
"Rock 'n' Roll Gypsy"	1986
"Broken Heroes"	1986
"Waiting For The Night"	1986
"Rock The Nations"	1986
"Northern Lady"	1987
"Ride Like The Wind"	1988
"I Can't Wait Anymore"	1988
"Requiem We Will Remember"	1991
"Dogs Of War"	1995
"Unleash The Beast"	1997
"Killing Ground"	2001
"Beyond The Grave"	2004
"Witchfinder General"	2004
"Let Me Feel Your Power"	2007
"I've Got To Rock"	2007
"If I Was You"	2007
"Battalions Of Steel"	2009
"Hammer Of The Gods"	2011
"Call To The Arms (Orchestral Version)"	2011
"Sacrifice"	2013
"Battering Ram"	2015
"Thunderbolt"	2018
"Nosferatu, The Vampire's Waltz"	2018
"Predator"	2018
"Paint It Black"	2021
"Speed King"	2021
"Carpe Diem"	2021
"The Pilgrimage"	2022
"Remember The Fallen"	2022
"Black Is The Night"	2022
"Dambusters"	2022
"The Faith Healer"	2023
"Razamanaz"	2023
"Hell, Fire And Dammation"	2023
"Madame Guillotine"	2023
"There's Something In Roswell"	2023
"Fire And Steel"	2023
"1066"	2024
"Gods of thunder"	2026
"Medusa"	2026

== Singles ==
Year	Single	UK
1979	"Big Teaser"; B-side: "Stallions of the Highway"	—
1979	"Backs to the Wall"; B-side: "Militia Guard"	—
1980	"Wheels of Steel"; B-side: "Stand Up and Be Counted"	20
1980	"747 (Strangers in the Night)"; B-side: "See The Light Shining"	13
1980	"Big Teaser" (re-issue); B-side: "Rainbow Theme"	66
1980	"Backs to the Wall" (re-issue); B-side: "Militia Guard"	64
1980	"Suzie Hold On"; B-side: "Judgement Day (Live)"	—
1980	"Strong Arm of the Law"; B-side: "Taking Your Chances"	63
1981	"And the Bands Played On"; B-side: "Hungry Years"	12
1981	"Never Surrender"; B-side: "20,000 Ft. (Remix)"	18
1981	"Princess of the Night"; B-side: "Fire in the Sky"	57
1983	Power and the Glory"; B-side: "See the Lightning Shine (Live)"	32
1983	"Nightmare"; B-side: "Midas Touch"	50
1984	"Sailing to America"; B-side: "A Little Bit of What You Fancy"	81
1984	"Do It All for You"; B-side: "Just Let Me Rock"	178
1985	"Back on the Streets"; B-side: "Live Fast Die Young"	75
1986	"Rock 'n' Roll Gypsy"; B-side: "Krakatoa"	72
1986	"Waiting for the Night"; B-side: "Chase the Fade"	66
1986	"Rock the Nations"; B-side: "747 (Strangers in the Night)"	80
1987	"Northern Lady"; B-side: "Everybody Up"	91
1988	"Ride Like the Wind"; B-side: "Red Alert"	52
1988	"I Can't Wait Anymore"; B-side: "Broken Heroes (Live)"	71
1991	"We Will Remember"; B-side: "Alter of the Gods"	—
"—" denotes releases that did not chart.
