= Greatest Hits Live! (Saxon album) =

1990 live album by Saxon

Greatest Hits Live

Live album by Saxon
- Released: 24 September 1990
- Recorded: 1989
- Genre: Heavy metal
- Length: 74:43
- Label: Castle
- Producer: Biff Byford

Saxon chronology
Rock 'n' Roll Gypsies (1989)	Greatest Hits Live (1990)	Solid Ball of Rock (1991)

Professional ratings
Review scores
Source	Rating
AllMusic	3/5 stars
Collector's Guide to Heavy Metal	6/10

Greatest Hits Live!

Video by Saxon
- Released: 1989
- Genre: Heavy metal
- Label: Castle

Saxon chronology
Live Innocence! (1986)	Greatest Hits Live! (1989)	Power & the Glory - Video Anthology (1990)

Greatest Hits Live is the third live album by the band Saxon. It is the first album with bass player Timothy "Nibbs" Carter. It was released in 1990, just one year after their previous live album Rock 'n' Roll Gypsies to celebrate the tenth anniversary of the band's successful career since their second album Wheels of Steel (1980), together with a VHS of the concert. This '10 Years Of Denim And Leather' concert was later released on DVD as Saxon 'Live Legends' with the extra track Strong Arm of the Law.

== Track listing ==
No.	Title	Length
1.	"Opening Theme (Gustav Holst)"	1:36
2.	"Heavy Metal Thunder (Biff Byford/Steve Dawson/Peter Gill/Graham Oliver/Paul Quinn)"	3:18
3.	"Rock and Roll Gypsy (Biff Byford/Steve Dawson)"	4:44
4.	"And the Bands Played On"	2:58
5.	"20,000 Ft. (Biff Byford/Steve Dawson/Peter Gill/Graham Oliver/Paul Quinn)"	3:16
6.	"Ride Like the Wind (Christopher Cross)"	3:47
7.	"Motorcycle Man (Biff Byford/Steve Dawson/Peter Gill/Graham Oliver/Paul Quinn)"	4:07
8.	"747 (Strangers in the Night)"	5:04
9.	"See the Light Shining"	5:56
10.	"Frozen Rainbow (Biff Byford/Steve Dawson/Peter Gill/Graham Oliver/Paul Quinn)"	6:38
11.	"Princess of the Night (Biff Byford/Steve Dawson/Peter Gill/Graham Oliver/Paul Quinn)"	4:16
12.	"Wheels of Steel (Biff Byford/Steve Dawson/Peter Gill/Graham Oliver/Paul Quinn)"	9:39
13.	"Denim and Leather (Biff Byford/Steve Dawson/Peter Gill/Graham Oliver/Paul Quinn)"	4:08
14.	"Crusader (Biff Byford/Steve Dawson/Peter Gill/Graham Oliver/Paul Quinn)"	4:08
15.	"Rockin' Again (Biff Byford/Steve Dawson)"	4:18
16.	"Back on the Streets"	4:58

All songs written by Saxon except where noted

== Personnel ==
- Biff Byford – lead vocals
- Paul Quinn – guitars
- Graham Oliver – guitars
- Tim "Nibbs" Carter – bass guitar
- Nigel Glockler – drums

Production

- Biff Byford – producer
- Ian Taylor – audio engineer
- East Midlands Television Centre, Nottingham – recording location
- OUTSIDE Studio, Manor – mixing location
