= The Eagle Has Landed =

The Eagle Has Landed may refer to:

- "The Eagle Has Landed", a famous statement by Neil Armstrong after landing Lunar Module Eagle on the moon in the Apollo 11 lunar landing.
- The Eagle Has Landed (novel), 1975 novel by Jack Higgins
  - The Eagle Has Landed (film), 1976 film based on the novel
- The Eagle Has Landed (album), 1982 album by the band Saxon
  - The Eagle Has Landed, 1983 song by the band Saxon on Power & the Glory
  - The Eagle Has Landed – Part II, 1996 album by the band Saxon
  - The Eagle Has Landed – Part III, 2006 album by the band Saxon
- "The Eagle Has Landed", a song by Nebula from their 2006 album Apollo
- "The Eagle Has Landed", 2016 song from Feathers & Flesh by the band Avatar
- The Eagle Has Landed (statue), a statue unveiled in 2019, dedicated to the Apollo 11 crew

== See also ==
- Apollo 11, for the quotation from the 1969 Moon landing
