= A Collection of Metal =

Compilation album by Saxon
- Released: 14 October 1996
- Genre: Heavy metal
- Length: 65:54
- Label: EMI

Saxon chronology
| The Eagle Has Landed – Part II (1996) | A Collection of Metal (1996) | Unleash the Beast (1997) |

Professional ratings
Review scores
| Source | Rating |
|---|---|
| Allmusic | 4.5/5 stars |

A Collection of Metal is a compilation album by the British heavy metal band Saxon released in 1996 (see 1996 in music).

== Track listing ==
| No. | Title | Length |
|---|---|---|
| 1. | "747 (Strangers in the Night)" | 3:45 |
| 2. | "Rock n' Roll Gypsy" | 4:12 |
| 3. | "And the Bands Played On" | 2:48 |
| 4. | "Back on the Streets" | 4:00 |
| 5. | "Ride Like the Wind" | 4:22 |
| 6. | "Big Teaser" | 4:08 |
| 7. | "I Can't Wait Anymore" (Remix) | 4:35 |
| 8. | "Broken Heroes" (Live) | 6:05 |
| 9. | "Raise Some Hell" | 3:43 |
| 10. | "Denim and Leather" | 5:27 |
| 11. | "Rock the Nations" | 4:41 |
| 12. | "Motorcycle Man" | 3:58 |
| 13. | "Everybody Up" | 3:30 |
| 14. | "Rock City" | 3:16 |
| 15. | "Set Me Free" | 3:13 |
| 16. | "Play It Loud" | 4:21 |
| Total length: | | 65:54 |
