= Forever Free (Saxon album) =

Studio album by Saxon
- Released: 18 May 1992
- Recorded: 1992
- Studios: Hey You Studios, Vienna, Austria, Gems Studios Boston, Lincolnshire, England
- Genre: Heavy metal
- Length: 44:11
- Label: CBH/Virgin
- Producers: Biff Byford, Herwig Ursin

Saxon chronology
Solid Ball of Rock (1991)	Forever Free (1992)	Dogs of War (1995)

Alternative cover

Singles from Forever Free
- 1. "Iron Wheels / Forever Free" Released: 31 August 1992

Professional ratings
Review scores
Source	Rating
AllMusic	3.5/5 stars
Collector's Guide to Heavy Metal	7/10

Forever Free is the eleventh studio album by heavy metal band Saxon released in 1992.

A UK version of the album features a cover of a biker Space Marine from the Warhammer 40,000 tabletop wargame.

In 2013, Demon Music Group reissued the album digitally and on CD in the UK. This version included two bonus tracks taken from their 1996 double live album, The Eagle Has Landed – Part II. It was the last full-length album to feature guitarist Graham Oliver.

== Track listing ==
No.	Title	Writer(s)	Length
1.	"Forever Free"	Biff Byford, Graham Oliver, Paul Quinn	4:57
2.	"Hole in the Sky"	Byford, Oliver, Quinn, Nibbs Carter	4:42
3.	"Just Wanna Make Love to You"	Willie Dixon	3:54
4.	"Get Down and Dirty"	Byford, Oliver, Nigel Glockler	5:05
5.	"Iron Wheels"	Byford, Glockler	4:12
6.	"One Step Away"	Byford, Oliver, Glockler	4:57
7.	"Can't Stop Rockin'"	Byford, Quinn	4:03
8.	"Nighthunter"	Byford, Quinn, Carter	3:22
9.	"Grind"	Byford, Oliver, Quinn	4:23
10.	"Cloud Nine"	Byford, Glockler, Carter	4:36

Bonus tracks (2013 reissue)
No.	Title	Writer(s)	Length
11.	"Princess of the Night" (Live in Germany - December 1995)	Saxon	5:15
12.	"Forever Free" (Live in Germany - December 1995)	Byford, Oliver, Quinn	4:48

== Personnel ==
Saxon

- Biff Byford – vocals, acoustic guitar
- Paul Quinn – guitars
- Graham Oliver – guitars
- Nibbs Carter – bass guitar
- Nigel Glockler – drums

Additional musicians

- Gigi Skokan, Nasco – programming, keyboards

Production

- Biff Byford – producer
- Herwig Ursin – producer
- Rainer Hänsel – audio engineer
- Hey You Studios, Vienna – recording location
- Gems Studios Boston, Lincolnshire, England – recording location
- Mastered at Hey You Production, L.A. Studio City, Blairwoodroad – mastering location

== Charts ==
Chart (1992)	Peak position
German Albums (Offizielle Top 100)	58
