= Battering Ram (disambiguation) =

A battering ram is a siege engine originating in ancient times.

Battering Ram may also refer to:

- Battering Ram (comics), a fictional mutant in the Marvel Universe
- Battering Ram (Iron Savior album), a 2004 album by the German power metal band Iron Savior
- Battering Ram (Saxon album), a 2015 album by the English heavy metal band Saxon
