= Gods of Thunder =

Studio album by Saxon
- Released: 22 January 2027
- Genre: Heavy metal
- Length: 40:25
- Label: Silver Lining Music
- Producer: Biff Byford

Saxon chronology
Hell, Fire and Damnation (2024)	Gods of Thunder (2027)

Singles from Gods of Thunder
- 1. "Gods of Thunder" Released: 2 September 2026; 2. "Medusa" Released: 27 October 2026

Gods of Thunder is the upcoming twenty-fifth studio album by English heavy metal band Saxon. The album will be released on 22 January 2027 through Silver Lining Music. Gods of Thunder was produced by the band's vocalist Biff Byford.

== Background ==
In January 2024, Saxon released their twenty-fourth studio album Hell, Fire and Damnation. In February 2025, Byford revealed that Saxon have begun writing new material for their next album, which they plan to release around late 2026.

== Release and promotion ==
On 20 July 2026, Saxon revealed the album's title, Gods of Thunder, scheduled to be released on 22 January 2027. It also represents the first album not to include guitarist and co-founder Paul Quinn who did not play on the album, with Brian Tattler replacing him on the road and in the studio, though Quinn remains with the band. On 2 September 2026, the band released the album's lead single and eponymous title track. On 27 October 2026, they released the second single, entitled "Medusa".

== Track listing ==
No.	Title	Length
1.	"The Flight of Pegasus"	1:21
2.	"Medusa"	4:24
3.	"Gods of Thunder"	4:35
4.	"Blood Moon Rising"	4:01
5.	"The Bloody Tower (The Ballad of Anne Boleyn)"	4:58
6.	"Remember the Alamo"	4:58
7.	"Metal Machine"	4:06
8.	"Temple of Rock"	3:59
9.	"Take the Sword from the Stone"	4:43
10.	"MI5"	3:20
Total length:		40:25

== Personnel ==
=== Saxon ===
- Biff Byford – lead vocals, production
- Doug Scarratt – guitars
- Brian Tatler – guitars
- Nibbs Carter – bass
- Nigel Glockler – drums
