= The Saxon Chronicles =

Video by Saxon
- Released: 2003
- Recorded: Wacken Open Air Festival, Germany, 3 August 2001
- Genre: Heavy metal
- Length: 225 min.
- Label: SPV/Steamhammer

Saxon chronology
Power & the Glory – Video Anthology (1990)	The Saxon Chronicles (2003)	Live Innocence – The Power & the Glory (2003)

The Saxon Chronicles is a double DVD showcasing one of the NWOBHM pioneers spanning 23 years of their career. It features a 2001 concert, interviews, videos, and on-tour documentaries. It was given a rating of two stars by Record Collector.

== Disc 1 ==
- Wacken Open Air Festival, Germany 2001 (97 min. video)
1. "Motorcycle Man"
2. "Dogs of War"
3. "Heavy Metal Thunder"
4. "Cut Out the Disease"
5. "Solid Ball of Rock"
6. "Metalhead"
7. "The Eagle Has Landed"
8. "Conquistador (Drum Solo)"
9. "Crusader"
10. "Power and the Glory"
11. "Princess of the Night"
12. "Wheels of Steel (Guitar Solo)"
13. "Strong Arm of the Law"
14. "20,000 Ft."
15. "Denim and Leather"
- Interview with Biff Byford (13 min. video)
- Moving Main Menu with sound
- Title Selection with sound
- Sound and subtitle selection
- Discography

== Disc 2 ==
- Saxon on Tour (approx. 36 min Video)
- Saxon Videos (approx 37 min. 8 video clips)
1. "Suzie Hold On"
2. "Power & The Glory"
3. "Nightmare"
4. "Back on the Streets Again"
5. "Rockin' Again"
6. "(Requiem) We Will Remember"
7. "Unleash the Beast" + Behind the Scenes
8. "Killing Ground"
- Saxon on TV (approx. 16 min. video: Interviews, History, TV-Appearances)
1. "And the Bands Played On"
2. "Back on the Streets"
3. "Never Surrender"
4. "Denim and Leather"
5. "Wheels of Steel"
- Interactive Features: Interactive Menus & Scene Access
- Text/Photo Gallery: Photo Gallery and Press Clippings
- DVD-Rom Features: Web Links

== Additional notes ==
- DVD Features: Full Frame - 1:33
- Region 0
- Disc 1 Audio: Dolby Digital 5.1 - English
- Disc 2 Audio: Dolby Digital 2.0 - English
