= Into the Labyrinth (Saxon album) =

Into The Labyrinth
- Cover art by Paul R. Gregory

Studio album by Saxon
- Released: 9 January 2009
- Recorded: 2008
- Studio: Twilight Hall, Krefeld, Germany
- Genre: Heavy metal
- Length: 54:47
- Label: SPV/Steamhammer
- Producer: Charlie Bauerfeind

Saxon chronology
The Inner Sanctum (2007)	Into The Labyrinth (2009)	Call to Arms (2011)

Professional ratings
Review scores
Source	Rating
AllMusic	3.5/5 stars
IGN	7.7/10
Jukebox:Metal	4/5 stars
Record Collector	4/5 stars

Into the Labyrinth, the eighteenth studio album by British heavy metal band Saxon, was released on 9 January 2009. It was made between tours in 2008 and written by the band in England and at Biff Byford's house in France. The first single, "Live to Rock", was released on 17 October 2008. The album sold about 1,000 copies in the US in the week after its release.

A proper physical fourteenth track is featured on the Japanese CD pressing, released on 3 February 2009. Previously, it sold as a compressed, low-bitrate download.

The song "Coming Home" is originally from Saxon's Killing Ground album, in an electric version.

In November 2008, Saxon announced a "Riff King" competition, for fans who could play a solo for "Live to Rock". The winner was Claudio Kiari of Brazil.

"When I wrote 'Valley of the Kings'," recalled Byford, "I had to get it right with the pharaohs and stuff, or else some wiseass would go, 'Hey, you got the wrong Rameses!'"

== Track listing ==
All lyrics are written by Biff Byford; all music is composed by Biff Byford, Doug Scarratt, Paul Quinn, Nigel Glockler, Timothy Carter.

No.	Title	Length
1.	"Battalions of Steel"	6:34
2.	"Live to Rock"	5:30
3.	"Demon Sweeney Todd"	3:51
4.	"The Letter"	0:42
5.	"Valley of the Kings"	5:03
6.	"Slow Lane Blues"	4:08
7.	"Crime of Passion"	4:04
8.	"Premonition in D Minor"	0:40
9.	"Voice"	4:35
10.	"Protect Yourselves"	3:56
11.	"Hellcat"	3:54
12.	"Come Rock of Ages (The Circle Is Complete)"	3:52
13.	"Coming Home" (Bottleneck Version)	3:12
14.	"Live to Rock" (Single Version, Japan-only bonus track)	4:46

== Personnel ==
- Biff Byford – lead vocals
- Paul Quinn – guitars
- Doug Scarratt – guitars
- Nibbs Carter – bass guitar
- Nigel Glockler – drums
- Matthias Ulmer – keyboards

== Charts ==
Chart (2009)	Peak position
Dutch Albums (Album Top 100)	83
French Albums (SNEP)	87
German Albums (Offizielle Top 100)	23
Swedish Albums (Sverigetopplistan)	33
Swiss Albums (Schweizer Hitparade)	61
UK Rock & Metal Albums (OCC)	6
US Independent Albums (Billboard)	72
