= Hell, Fire and Damnation =

Studio album by Saxon
- Released: 19 January 2024
- Studio: Big Silver Barn (York): Lampes Posthotel Old Cinema Restaurant Der Krug (Germany)
- Genre: Heavy metal
- Length: 42:18
- Label: Silver Lining Music
- Producers: Biff Byford; Andy Sneap

Saxon chronology
More Inspirations (2023)	Hell, Fire and Damnation (2024)	Gods of Thunder (2027)

Professional ratings
Review scores
Source	Rating
Blabbermouth	7.5/10
Classic Rock	3/5 stars
Metal Injection	8.5/10

Hell, Fire and Damnation is the twenty-fourth studio album by English heavy metal band Saxon, released on 19 January 2024 through Silver Lining Music. It charted internationally across Europe, reaching the top 20 of the UK Albums Chart.

== Track listing ==
All tracks are written by Pete "Biff" Byford, Brian Tatler, Doug Scarratt, Tim "Nibbs" Carter, except "The Prophecy" written by Brian Blessed.

No.	Title	Length
1.	"The Prophecy"	1:24
2.	"Hell, Fire and Damnation"	5:32
3.	"Madame Guillotine"	5:24
4.	"Fire and Steel"	3:37
5.	"There's Something in Roswell"	4:09
6.	"Kubla Khan and the Merchant of Venice"	4:15
7.	"Pirates of the Airwaves"	3:56
8.	"1066"	4:03
9.	"Witches of Salem"	5:11
10.	"Super Charger"	4:47
Total length:		42:20

Bonus Track For Japan
No.	Title	Length
11.	"Predator (Manchester 2018)"	03:18
Total length:		45:38

== Personnel ==
=== Saxon ===
- Biff Byford – lead vocals, production
- Doug Scarratt – guitars
- Brian Tatler – guitars
- Nibbs Carter – bass
- Nigel Glockler – drums
- Paul Quinn – additional guitars on "Fire and Steel" and "Super Charger"

=== Additional contributors ===
- Andy Sneap – production, mixing, mastering
- Brian Blessed – spoken word on "The Prophecy"
- Péter Sallai – album cover artwork

== Charts ==
Chart (2024)	Peak position
Austrian Albums (Ö3 Austria)	4
Belgian Albums (Ultratop Flanders)	30
Belgian Albums (Ultratop Wallonia)	20
Dutch Albums (Album Top 100)	59
Finnish Albums (Suomen virallinen lista)	21
French Albums (SNEP)	27
German Albums (Offizielle Top 100)	4
Italian Albums (FIMI)	91
Polish Albums (ZPAV)	51
Scottish Albums (Official Charts)	2
Spanish Albums (Promusicae)	28
Swedish Albums (Sverigetopplistan)	6
Swiss Albums (Schweizer Hitparade)	4
UK Albums (Official Charts)	19
UK Independent Albums (Official Charts)	1
UK Rock & Metal Albums (Official Charts)	2
