= The Inner Sanctum =

Studio album by Saxon
- Released: 5 March 2007
- Recorded: 2006
- Studios: Gems 24 Studio, Boston, Lincolnshire, UK
- Genre: Heavy metal
- Length: 47:48
- Label: SPV/Steamhammer
- Producer: Charlie Bauerfeind

Saxon chronology
The Eagle Has Landed – Part III (2006)	The Inner Sanctum (2007)	Into the Labyrinth (2009)

The Inner Sanctum is the seventeenth studio album by British heavy metal band Saxon, released on 5 March 2007. It is the first album by the band to feature drummer Nigel Glockler since 1997's Unleash the Beast. A limited edition with DVD is available too.

== Reception ==
Professional ratings
Review scores
Source	Rating
AllMusic	3.5/5 stars
Jukebox:Metal	3/5 stars
Rock Hard	9.0/10
Blabbermouth	8/10
Metal Storm	7.6/10

The Inner Sanctum has received generally positive reviews from critics. Eduardo Rivadavia of AllMusic gave the album three and a half out of five stars, and commented that Saxon continued "to do their legacy proud as they move through their third decade of recording activity." He described the album's first three tracks as "frantic" and the third, "Let Me Feel Your Power" as "jaw-dropping", and also praised the "majestic" "Red Star Falling", comparing it to the band's earlier songs "Dallas 1PM" and "Broken Heroes", although he was critical towards the single version of "If I Was You", advising the listener to "make sure your CD contains the album version". Rivadavia concluded his review by saying "although it's certainly not perfect by any stretch, The Inner Sanctum is welcome addition to this band's sizeable discography, and, pound for pound, might just take the crown as Saxon's best album of the early 2000s."

However, Andy Lye of Jukebox:Metal was more critical in his review of the album, giving it three out of five stars, and criticizing its opening track "State of Grace", calling it "derivative and largely boring", and also "Let Me Feel Your Power" commenting that "a great, grooving mid-section can't quite save it from its appalling lyrics and tired riffs." He went on to call "I've Got to Rock (To Stay Alive)" "as bad as you'd expect" and criticized "If I Was You" for sounding "exactly like all metal singles sound". He concluded by stating that "Against the wider metal market this is an average album (hence three stars), but against recent Saxon output it is comfortably below average."

== Track listing ==
All lyrics are written by Byford; all music is composed by Biff Byford, Paul Quinn, Nigel Glockler, Nibbs Carter, Doug Scarratt.

No.	Title	Length
1.	"State of Grace"	5:37
2.	"Need for Speed"	3:08
3.	"Let Me Feel Your Power"	3:29
4.	"Red Star Falling"	6:16
5.	"I've Got to Rock (To Stay Alive)"	4:40
6.	"If I Was You" (Album Version)	3:27
7.	"Going Nowhere Fast"	4:15
8.	"Ashes to Ashes"	4:52
9.	"Empire Rising"	0:41
10.	"Atila The Hun"	8:09
11.	"If I Was You" (Single Version; Only in the standard edition)	3:06

Japan bonus tracks
No.	Title	Length
12.	"747 (Strangers in the Night)"	5:07
13.	"Backs to the Wall" (Live 2005)	3:19
14.	"Stand Up And Be Counted" (Live 2005)	3:26
15.	"Never Surrender" (Live 2005)	3:29
16.	"Wheels of Steel" (Live 2005)	9:01
17.	"And The Bands Played On" (Live 2004)	3:47

CD 2 Limited Edition, Digipak Bonus DVD

A Night Out with the Boys
No.	Title	Length
1.	"To Hell and Back Again"
2.	"A Night Out with the Boys – The Idea"
3.	"A Night Out with the Boys – Not Really"
4.	"See the Light Shining"
5.	"A Night Out with the Boys – Now It Started"
6.	"Redline"
7.	"Suzie Hold On"
8.	"Stand Up and Be Counted"
9.	"Frozen Rainbow"
10.	"Never Surrender"

== Notes ==
- "Red Star Falling" is about the end of communism in Soviet Union.
- "Atila the Hun" is about Attila the Hun, who almost destroyed the Roman Empire.
- "If I Was You" is about asking why an individual would go from being an innocent child to a violent adult.
- "Let Me Feel Your Power" is about festivals like Wacken, which Saxon has headlined twice.
- "I've Got to Rock (to Stay Alive)" is about rock n' roll and life. The single version features guest appearances by heavy metal musicians Lemmy Kilmister, Angry Anderson, and Andi Deris.

== Personnel ==
- Biff Byford – lead vocals
- Paul Quinn – guitars
- Doug Scarratt – guitars
- Nibbs Carter – bass guitar
- Nigel Glockler – drums, keyboards

== Charts ==
Chart (2007)	Peak position
French Albums (SNEP)	138
German Albums (Offizielle Top 100)	36
Japanese Albums (Oricon)	162
Swedish Albums (Sverigetopplistan)	39
Swiss Albums (Schweizer Hitparade)	89
UK Rock & Metal Albums (Official Charts)	4
