= Inspirations (Saxon album) =

Studio album by Saxon
- Released: 19 March 2021
- Recorded: 2020
- Studio: Brockfield Hall, The Big Silver Barn
- Genre: Heavy metal
- Length: 40:12
- Label: Silver Lining Music
- Producer: Biff Byford

Saxon chronology
Thunderbolt (2018)	Inspirations (2021)	Carpe Diem (2022)

Singles from Inspirations
- 1. "Paint It Black" Released: 2020; 2. "Speed King" Released: 2021; 3. "Paperback Writer" Released: 2021

Inspirations is the first cover album by the English heavy metal band Saxon, released on 19 March 2021 by Silver Lining Music. Consisting entirely of covers, it was recorded at Brockfield Hall and The Big Silver Barn in York and produced by Biff Byford.

== Background ==
Inspirations consists of covers of songs of various artists from the 1960s and 1970s that influenced Saxon over the years. Byford said ″We wanted to do an album based on our influences, the songs and bands that inspired us to write what we did and still do, and it was also interesting to see what my voice could do as I haven't sung many of these songs before.″ The songs are mostly from the hard rock, psychedelic rock, blues rock, and heavy metal genres. The band played close to the musical styles of the bands they covered, but also added some of their own heavier sound.

To record the album the band travelled to historic Brockfield Hall in York, where they played and recorded the songs live. Byford recorded his vocals at The Big Silver Barn, also in York.

Three music videos were released from this album. The first video was released on 11 December 2020 for the song ″Paint It Black″. The video features a behind-the-scenes look Saxon performing the song at Brockfield Hall, where the album was recorded. The second video was released on 15 January 2021 for the song ″Speed King″. The video features clips of rally cars speeding down various tracks. The third video is a lyric video for the song ″Paperback Writer″. The video consists of a digital animation of a quill writing out the lyrics of the songs on paper as they are sung, cut with shots of the album art during instrumental portions.

== Reception ==
Professional ratings
Review scores
Source	Rating
Blabbermouth	7.5/10
The Rockpit	8/10
Metal Injection	7/10

The album is generally well received. It managed to chart in several countries, reaching a peak of 10 on the German music charts. It was described as ″vibrant and brashly entertaining″ by Dom Lawson in his review for Blabbermouth. He also described being able to hear Biff Byford sing several of the tracks as "an absolute joy".

== Track listing ==
Inspirations track listing
No.	Title	Music	Original artist (date)	Length
1.	"Paint It Black"	Mick Jagger, Keith Richards	The Rolling Stones, 1966	3:18
2.	"Immigrant Song"	Jimmy Page, Robert Plant	Led Zeppelin, 1970	2:05
3.	"Paperback Writer"	Lennon–McCartney	The Beatles, 1966	2:19
4.	"Evil Woman"	Dave Wagner, Dick Wiegand, Larry Wiegand	Crow, 1969	3:29
5.	"Stone Free"	Jimi Hendrix	Jimi Hendrix, 1966	3:44
6.	"Bomber"	Eddie Clarke, Ian Kilmister, Phil Taylor	Motörhead, 1979	3:22
7.	"Speed King"	Ritchie Blackmore, Ian Gillan, Roger Glover, Jon Lord and Ian Paice	Deep Purple, 1970	3:31
8.	"The Rocker"	Phil Lynott, Brian Downey, Eric Bell	Thin Lizzy, 1973	3:46
9.	"Hold the Line"	David Paich	Toto, 1978	3:47
10.	"Problem Child"	Angus Young, Malcolm Young, Bon Scott	AC/DC, 1976	4:09
11.	"See My Friends"	Ray Davies	The Kinks, 1965	2:55
12.	"Shoot Shoot"	Michael Schenker, Phil Mogg, Pete Way, Andy Parker	UFO, 1975	3:47

== Personnel ==
Saxon

- Biff Byford – Lead Vocals
- Paul Quinn – Guitars
- Doug Scarratt – Guitars
- Nibbs Carter – Bass
- Nigel Glockler – Drums

== Charts ==
Chart (2021)	Peak position
Austrian Albums (Ö3 Austria)	27
Belgian Albums (Ultratop Flanders)	102
Belgian Albums (Ultratop Wallonia)	34
French Albums (SNEP)	154
German Albums (Offizielle Top 100)	10
Scottish Albums (OCC)	6
Swiss Albums (Schweizer Hitparade)	12
UK Albums (OCC)	56
UK Independent Albums (OCC)	2
UK Rock & Metal Albums (OCC)	1
