= Lionheart (Saxon album) =

- Cover art by Paul R. Gregory

Studio album by Saxon
- Released: 20 September 2004
- Recorded: 2004
- Studio: Gems 24 (Boston, Lincolnshire)
- Genre: Heavy metal
- Length: 45:03
- Label: SPV/Steamhammer
- Producer: Charlie Bauerfeind

Saxon chronology
Heavy Metal Thunder (2002)	Lionheart (2004)	The Eagle Has Landed – Part III (2006)

Alternative cover

CD + DVD edition cover

Professional ratings
Review scores
Source	Rating
AllMusic	3.5/5 stars

Lionheart is the sixteenth studio album by English heavy metal band Saxon, released in 2004. It is the only studio album featuring drummer Jörg Michael. The title is inspired from Richard the Lionheart, a 12th-century King of England. "Beyond the Grave" was released as a single and a video. The album was re-released on 17 February 2006 in digipak format (limited to 10,000 copies) with a bonus DVD-Audio featuring previously unreleased material, videos, rough mixes and a new 5.1 / 96 K mix of the whole album, as well as a Saxon keyholder and a patch.

== Track listing ==
All tracks are written by Saxon.

No.	Title	Length
1.	"Witchfinder General"	4:49
2.	"Man and Machine"	3:28
3.	"The Return"	1:18
4.	"Lionheart"	6:04
5.	"Beyond the Grave"	4:55
6.	"Justice"	4:26
7.	"To Live by the Sword"	4:10
8.	"Jack Tars"	0:57
9.	"English Man 'O' War"	4:08
10.	"Searching for Atlantis"	5:54
11.	"Flying on the Edge"	4:54

== Lyrical concept ==
- "Witchfinder General" is about persecuting witches during the Interregnum era. The song also mentions methods of interrogation and execution favoured by 'Witchfinder General' Matthew Hopkins.
- "Lionheart" is about Richard the Lionheart, King of England from 1189 to 1199.
- "Beyond the Grave" is about death and afterlife.
- "To Live by the Sword" is about the way of life of samurai.

== Personnel ==
Saxon

- Biff Byford – lead vocals
- Paul Quinn – guitars
- Doug Scarratt – guitars
- Nibbs Carter – bass guitar, keyboards
- Jörg Michael – drums

Additional performer

- Chris Stubley – keyboards on "Lionheart"

Production

- Charlie Bauerfeind – producer and engineer
- Biff Byford – executive producer
- Paul R. Gregory – cover design
- Sandra Hiltmann, SPV graphics – booklet design

== Charts ==
Chart (2004)	Peak position
French Albums (SNEP)	103
German Albums (Offizielle Top 100)	44
Greek Albums (IFPI)	44
Swedish Albums (Sverigetopplistan)	57
Swiss Albums (Schweizer Hitparade)	62
UK Rock & Metal Albums (Official Charts)	22
