= Dogs of War (album) =

- Cover art by Paul R. Gregory

Studio album by Saxon
- Released: September 1995
- Recorded: 1994
- Studios: Gems Studio, Boston, Lincolnshire, England & at Revolution Studio, Manchester, England
- Genre: Heavy metal
- Length: 49:34
- Label: CBH/Virgin
- Producers: Biff Byford, Rainer Hänsel

Saxon chronology
| Forever Free (1992) | Dogs of War (1995) | The Eagle Has Landed – Part II (1996) |

Professional ratings
Review scores
| Source | Rating |
|---|---|
| AllMusic | 4/5 stars |
| Collector's Guide to Heavy Metal | 7/10 |
| Record Collector | 3/5 stars |

Dogs of War is the twelfth studio album by British heavy metal band Saxon, released in 1995. It was the last album with Graham Oliver before he was fired.

Released in September 1995, Dogs of War marked a period of changes for Saxon, both in their sound and lineup. The band began to flirt more intensely with hard rock and had on the album the last appearance of Graham Oliver as a member of the classic formation, as the guitarist was expelled from Saxon for leading the sale of a 1980 live album without permission of the other members, having obtained all the profit from the sale of the bootleg. Even Dogs of War was re-released in 2009 with bonus tracks from this show.

== Track listing ==
All lyrics are written by Byford/Glockler; all music is composed by Saxon.

| No. | Title | Length |
|---|---|---|
| 1. | "Dogs of War" | 4:36 |
| 2. | "Burning Wheels" | 4:10 |
| 3. | "Don't Worry" | 5:17 |
| 4. | "Big Twin Rolling (Coming Home)" | 5:23 |
| 5. | "Hold On" | 4:31 |
| 6. | "The Great White Buffalo" | 5:52 |
| 7. | "Demolition Alley" | 6:09 |
| 8. | "Walking Through Tokyo" | 5:50 |
| 9. | "Give It All Away" | 4:03 |
| 10. | "Yesterday's Gone" | 3:43 |

A 2006 CD re-issue on SPV/Steamhammer Records includes two bonus live tracks: "The Great White Buffalo" and "Denim and Leather" recorded in 1995.

== Personnel ==
- Biff Byford – lead vocals
- Graham Oliver – guitars
- Paul Quinn – guitars
- Nibbs Carter – bass
- Nigel Glockler – drums
- Rainer Hänsel – guitars (guest)

Production

- Biff Byford – producer, mixing
- Rainer Hänsel – producer
- Kalle Trapp – mixing engineer
- John Mc Lane – mixing engineer
- Gems Studio in Boston, Lincolnshire, England – recording location
- Karo Studios, Brackel, Germany – mixing location
- Paul R. Gregory – artwork

== Charts ==
| Chart (1995) | Peak position |
|---|---|
| German Albums (Offizielle Top 100) | 55 |
| Swiss Albums (Schweizer Hitparade) | 43 |
