= Metalhead (album) =

- Cover art by Paul R. Gregory

Studio album by Saxon
- Released: 9 November 1999
- Recorded: 1999
- Studios: Karo Studios (Brackel, Germany)
- Genre: Heavy metal
- Length: 50:29
- Label: SPV/Steamhammer
- Producers: Biff Byford, Charlie Bauerfeind, Rainer Hänsel

Saxon chronology
BBC Sessions (1998)	Metalhead (1999)	Burrn! Presents: The Best of Saxon (2000)

Professional ratings
Review scores
Source	Rating
AllMusic	3/5 stars
Collector's Guide to Heavy Metal	8/10

Metalhead is the fourteenth studio album by heavy metal band Saxon released in 1999. It is the first album with Fritz Randow, who replaced Nigel Glockler in 1999.

The reason for the absence of the group's drummer, Nigel Glockler, was due to a serious injury to a nerve in the musician's neck. In any case, Nigel would still participate in the composition process of this record, more specifically in the introduction of this work.

== Track listing ==
All tracks are written by Pete "Biff" Byford, Paul Quinn, Doug Scarratt, Tim "Nibbs" Carter, except "Intro" by Nigel Glockler.

CD
No.	Title	Length
1.	"Intro"	1:24
2.	"Metalhead"	4:52
3.	"Are We Travellers in Time"	5:17
4.	"Conquistador"	4:42
5.	"What Goes Around"	4:24
6.	"Song of Evil"	4:12
7.	"All Guns Blazing"	3:53
8.	"Prisoner"	4:12
9.	"Piss Off"	4:04
10.	"Watching You"	5:18
11.	"Sea of Life"	8:11

== Personnel ==
Personnel taken from Metalhead CD booklet.

Saxon

- Biff Byford – lead vocals, producer
- Paul Quinn – guitars
- Doug Scarratt – guitars
- Nibbs Carter – bass guitar
- Fritz Randow – drums

Additional musicians

- Nigel Glockler – written and performed "Intro"
- Chris Bay – additional keyboards

Production

- Charlie Bauerfeind – producer, engineer, mixing
- Rainer Hänsel – executive producer
- Karo Studios, Hamburg, Germany – recording and mixing location

== Charts ==
Chart (1999)	Peak position
German Albums (Offizielle Top 100)	40
