= Carpe Diem (Saxon album) =

Studio album by Saxon
- Released: 4 February 2022
- Recorded: 2019–2020
- Studio: Backstage Recording Studios, Derbyshire, England (guitars); Big Silver Barn, York, England (vocals); Velbyproductions, Grünenplan, Germany (drums)
- Genre: Heavy metal
- Length: 44:19
- Label: Silver Lining Music
- Producer: Biff Byford, Andy Sneap

Saxon chronology
Inspirations (2021)	Carpe Diem (2022)	More Inspirations (2023)

Carpe Diem is the twenty-third studio album by English heavy metal band Saxon released in 2022.

== Background ==
In an October 2018 interview with Sonic Perspectives, Byford confirmed that Saxon would "definitely" record a new album sometime in 2019. He was quoted as saying, "We don't have to have too much commitment to timings. We're an established band — we can pretty much do what we want. If we feel like writing, then we write. If we don't feel like writing, then we don't write. Simple as that." Byford had stated that their new album was expected to be released in early 2021; but later sighted a tentative February 2022 release.

Music videos were released for "Carpe Diem (Seize the Day)", "Remember the Fallen", "The Pilgrimage", and "Black Is the Night" on the band's YouTube channel.

Saxon embarked on a UK/European tour with special guests Diamond Head named the Seize the Day tour after the album's opening track, with the UK leg of the tour opening in Ipswich on 11 November and ending on 26 November in London.

== Reception ==
Professional ratings
Review scores
Source	Rating
Blabbermouth	7.5/10 stars
Classic Rock	4/5 stars
Metal Hammer (Germany)	5.5/7 stars
Metal Storm	7.2/10 stars
Rock Hard	8.5/10 stars
Sputnikmusic	3,4/5

Carpe Diem was the band's highest-charting record in the United Kingdom since 1983's Power & the Glory, with a top position of 17 on the UK Albums Chart; the record also charted in the United States, reaching number 18 in Top Heatseekers, 26 in Top Current Album Sales, and 63 in Top Album Sales overall.

It was also Saxon's highest-charting album ever in several countries, including Germany, where it reached number 3 on the GfK charts; Switzerland, where the album reached number 4; and Austria, where it reached number 7. Carpe Diem also reached number 4 in the Finnish charts.

The record received positive reviews from critics. Blabbermouth gave the album a rating of 7.5 out of 10, and webzine Metal Storm called it "the most memorable record the band have put out in the last decade or so", commenting that the band are "still going strong" and granting a rating of 7.2.

== Track listing ==
All lyrics are written by Biff Byford; all music is composed by Byford, Paul Quinn, Nigel Glockler, Nibbs Carter, Doug Scarratt.

No.	Title	Length
1.	"Carpe Diem (Seize the Day)"	4:42
2.	"Age of Steam"	4:09
3.	"The Pilgrimage"	6:29
4.	"Dambusters"	3:20
5.	"Remember the Fallen"	5:15
6.	"Super Nova"	4:21
7.	"Lady in Gray"	5:13
8.	"All for One"	3:43
9.	"Black Is the Night"	4:12
10.	"Living on the Limit"	2:55
Total length:		44:19

Japan edition
No.	Title	Length
11.	"Killing Ground (London 2016)"	04:16
Total length:		48:36

== Personnel ==
Saxon

- Biff Byford – lead vocals, production
- Paul Quinn – guitars
- Doug Scarratt – guitars
- Nibbs Carter – bass guitar
- Nigel Glockler – drums

Additional musicians

- Seb Byford – vocals, engineer

Production

- Andy Sneap – production, mixing, engineer
- Paul Raymond Gregory – album artwork
- Enrique Zabala – booklet design

== Charts ==
Chart (2022)	Peak position
Austrian Albums (Ö3 Austria)	7
Belgian Albums (Ultratop Flanders)	35
Belgian Albums (Ultratop Wallonia)	21
Czech Albums (ČNS IFPI)	67
Finnish Albums (Suomen virallinen lista)	4
French Albums (SNEP)	59
German Albums (Offizielle Top 100)	3
Dutch Albums (Album Top 100)	59
Polish Albums (ZPAV)	29
Scottish Albums (OCC)	6
Spanish Albums (Promusicae)	34
Swedish Albums (Sverigetopplistan)	15
Swiss Albums (Schweizer Hitparade)	4
UK Albums (OCC)	17
UK Independent Albums (OCC)	4
UK Rock & Metal Albums (OCC)	2
US Top Current Album Sales (Billboard)	26
US Heatseekers Albums (Billboard)	18
US Top Album Sales (Billboard)	63
