= Solid Ball of Rock =

Studio album by Saxon
- Released: 14 January 1991
- Recorded: 1990
- Studios: Karo Studios, Hamburg, Germany
- Genre: Heavy metal
- Length: 44:49
- Label: CBH/Virgin
- Producers: Kalle Trapp, Saxon

Saxon chronology
Greatest Hits Live (1990)	Solid Ball of Rock (1991)	Forever Free (1992)

Singles from Solid Ball of Rock
- 1. "Requiem (We Will Remember) / Altar of the Gods" Released: March 1991

Solid Ball of Rock is the tenth studio album by heavy metal band Saxon released in 1991 on Virgin Records. Five of its 11 tracks were written by new bassist Nibbs Carter, who co-wrote another three songs.

"For our audience – and without an audience there is no band – our focus returned on Solid Ball of Rock…" noted singer Biff Byford. "Since then we've been right on it." Phil Sutcliffe in Q Magazine referred to the album as "a modicum of celebratory rock 'n' roll chest beating".

== Background ==
Kalle Trapp, who has worked on projects for Blind Guardian and Destruction, was appointed as the producer. The title track is based on a rockabilly-style song created by Biff Byford’s friend Bram Tchaikovsky, former member of The Motors.

== Reception ==
Professional ratings
Review scores
Source	Rating
AllMusic	2.5/5 stars
Collector's Guide to Heavy Metal	4/10
Kerrang!	3/5 stars
Q	2/5 stars
Rock Hard	9.5/10

On the UK Albums Chart, it became the first studio album since Wheels of Steel (1980) to miss the top 100. In contrast, on the German album chart, it remained in the top 100 for twelve consecutive weeks, peaking at number 23.

Eduardo Rivadavia of AllMusic gave the album 2.5 out of 5 stars, stating that "in the late 1980s, Saxon released several albums aimed at commercial success that were critically panned and were ultimately dropped by EMI. With this tenth studio album, however, the long path to their resurgence began." He added, "Overall, there are still inconsistencies in the songwriting, but young new bassist Nibbs Carter contributed particularly aggressive tracks in recent years, bringing a fresh dimension to the group."

== Track listing ==
No.	Title	Writer(s)	Length
1.	"Solid Ball of Rock"	Bram Tchaikovsky, Micki Broadbent	4:35
2.	"Altar of the Gods"	Timothy "Nibbs" Carter	3:30
3.	"Requiem (We Will Remember)"	Biff Byford, Graham Oliver, Carter, Nigel Glockler	5:16
4.	"Lights in the Sky"	Byford, Paul Quinn, Paul Johnson	4:03
5.	"I Just Can't Get Enough"	Byford, Oliver, Quinn	4:34
6.	"Baptism of Fire"	Carter	3:08
7.	"Ain't Gonna Take It"	Byford, Oliver, Carter, Glockler	4:47
8.	"I'm on Fire"	Carter	4:24
9.	"Overture in B-Minor / Refugee"	Byford, Carter	5:42
10.	"Bavarian Beaver" (Instrumental)	Carter	1:17
11.	"Crash Dive"	Carter	3:07
12.	"Reeperbahn Stomp" (Japanese only bonus track)	Carter	3:26

== Personnel ==
Saxon

- Biff Byford – lead vocals, engineer
- Graham Oliver – guitars
- Paul Quinn – guitars
- Nibbs Carter – bass
- Nigel Glockler – drums

Production

- Kalle Trapp – producer, engineer

== Charts ==
Chart (1991)	Peak position
German Albums (Offizielle Top 100)	23
Swiss Albums (Schweizer Hitparade)	28
