= BBC Sessions (Saxon album) =

BBC Sessions / Live at Reading Festival '86

Live album by Saxon
- Released: 3 November 1998
- Recorded: 1980, 1982, 1986
- Genre: Heavy metal
- Length: 67:56
- Label: EMI
- Producer: Tony Wilson

Saxon chronology
Donnington: The Live Tracks (1997)	BBC Sessions / Live at Reading Festival '86 (1998)	Metalhead (1999)

Professional ratings
Review scores
Source	Rating
AllMusic	4/5 stars

BBC Sessions / Live at Reading Festival '86 is a live compilation album by the British heavy metal band Saxon. It was recorded live in studio by the BBC's Tony Wilson for the BBC Radio 1 shows of the early 1980s and at the 1986 Reading Festival, where Saxon were the headliners.

== Track listing ==
Friday Rock Show 15 February 1980

No.	Title	Length
1.	"Backs to the Wall"	3:18
2.	"Stallions of the Highway"	2:47
3.	"Motorcycle Man"	3:47
4.	"Still Fit to Boogie"	2:45
5.	"747 (Strangers in the Night)"	5:01

Studio B15 Live 25 May 1982

No.	Title	Length
6.	"20,000 Ft."	3:18
7.	"Dallas 1 PM"	6:00
8.	"The Eagle Has Landed"	7:24

Reading Festival / Friday Rock Show recorded 23 August 1986, broadcast 24 October 1986

No.	Title	Length
9.	"Power and the Glory"	7:06
10.	"Never Surrender"	4:01
11.	"Rock the Nations"	5:10
12.	"Wheels of Steel"	6:07
13.	"Waiting for the Night"	4:39
14.	"Strong Arm of the Law"	6:25

The recording here is incomplete, BBC Radio having broadcast:

No.	Title	Length
1.	"Power and the Glory"
2.	"Never Surrender"
3.	"The Eagle Has Landed"
4.	"Rock the Nations"
5.	"747 (Strangers in the Night)"
6.	"20,000 Ft."
7.	"Wheels of Steel"
8.	"Waiting for the Night"
9.	"Strong Arm of the Law"

== Credits ==
- Biff Byford – lead vocals
- Graham Oliver – guitars
- Paul Quinn – guitars
- Steve Dawson – bass guitar
- Pete Gill – drums
- Nigel Glockler – drums

Production

- Tony Wilson – producer
- Tony Wilson – engineer
