= Donnington: The Live Tracks =

Live album by Saxon
- Released: 4 November 1997
- Recorded: 16 August 1980
- Venue: Castle Donington
- Genre: Heavy metal
- Length: 42:15
- Label: Angel Air

Saxon chronology
Unleash the Beast (1997)	Donnington: The Live Tracks (1997)	BBC Sessions (1998)

Live at Donnington 1980 cover

Professional ratings
Review scores
Source	Rating
AllMusic	3/5 stars

Donnington: The Live Tracks [sic] is a semi-official live album by Saxon, being a legal release but not sanctioned by the band. The recording was made at the first Monsters of Rock festival at Castle Donington on 16 August 1980 but was not released until fifteen years later. It was re-released as Live at Donnington 1980 in 2000.

"Backs to the Wall" had been featured on an official Polydor Records release, compiled from recordings of most of the artists who played that inaugural show.

== Track listing ==
1. "Motorcycle Man" – 3:42
2. "Still Fit to Boogie" – 2:43
3. "Freeway Mad" – 2:24
4. "Backs to the Wall" – 3:24
5. "Wheels of Steel" – 4:23
6. "Bap Shoo Ap" – 6:16
7. "747 (Strangers in the Night)" – 4:52
8. "Stallions of the Highway" – 3:19
9. "Machine Gun" – 5:35
10. Backstage Interview – 3:01
- Songs written by Saxon.

== Credits ==
- Biff Byford – lead vocals
- Graham Oliver – guitars
- Paul Quinn – guitars
- Steve Dawson – bass guitar
- Pete Gill – drums
