= The Eagle Has Landed – Part III =

Live album by Saxon
- Released: 2 June 2006
- Recorded: 2004–2005
- Genre: Heavy metal
- Label: Steamhammer/SPV

Saxon chronology
Lionheart (2004)	The Eagle Has Landed – Part III (2006)	The Inner Sanctum (2007)

Professional ratings
Review scores
Source	Rating
Scream Magazine	2/6

The Eagle Has Landed – Part III is a double live album by the English heavy metal band Saxon, released in 2006.

== Track listing ==
Disc 1
No.	Title	Length
1.	"This Town Rocks" (Stockholm 2005)	4:53
2.	"Backs to the Wall" (Nürnberg 2005)	3:28
3.	"Redline" (Hamburg 2005)	4:01
4.	"Stand Up and Be Counted" (Berlin 2005)	3:26
5.	"Never Surrender" (Berlin 2005)	3:33
6.	"Frozen Rainbow" (Fulda 2005)	6:49
7.	"Suzie Hold On" (Nürnberg 2005)	4:51
8.	"Play It Loud" (Nürnberg 2005)	4:27
9.	"Warrior" (Nürnberg 2005)	3:55
10.	"See the Light Shining" (Hamburg 2005)	6:45
11.	"To Hell and Back Again" (Hamburg 2005)	3:20
12.	"Stallions of the Highway" (Fulda 2005)	3:06
13.	"Wheels of Steel" (Nürnberg 2005)	8:51
14.	"And the Bands Played On" (Wacken 2004)	3:51
15.	"Crusader" (Wacken 2004)	7:04

Disc 2
No.	Title	Length
1.	"The Return" (Paris 2004)	1:41
2.	"Lionheart" (Paris 2004)	6:04
3.	"Man & Machine" (London 2004)	3:30
4.	"Beyond the Grave" (London 2004)	4:55
5.	"Searching for Atlantis" (London 2004)	5:40
6.	"To Live by the Sword Pt. I" (London 2004)	2:04
7.	"Unleash the Beast" (London 2004)	3:00
8.	"To Live by the Sword Pt. II" (London 2004)	1:31
9.	"Flying on the Edge" (Paris 2004)	4:34
10.	"Jack Tars" (Kiel 2004)	0:54
11.	"English Man O' War" (Kiel 2004)	4:19
12.	"Court of the Crimson King" (Kiel 2004)	5:20
13.	"Broken Heroes" (Kiel 2004)	6:46
14.	"Dragon's Lair" (Kiel 2004)	3:32
15.	"Rock is Our Life" (Wacken 2004)	5:11
16.	"Are We Travellers in Time" (Wacken 2004)	4:43
17.	"Solid Ball of Rock" (Wacken 2004)	5:55

== Personnel ==
- Biff Byford – lead vocals
- Doug Scarratt – guitars
- Paul Quinn – guitars
- Nibbs Carter – bass guitar
- Nigel Glockler – drums (2005 recordings)
- Jörg Michael – drums (2004 recordings)
