= Nigel Glockler =

British drummer

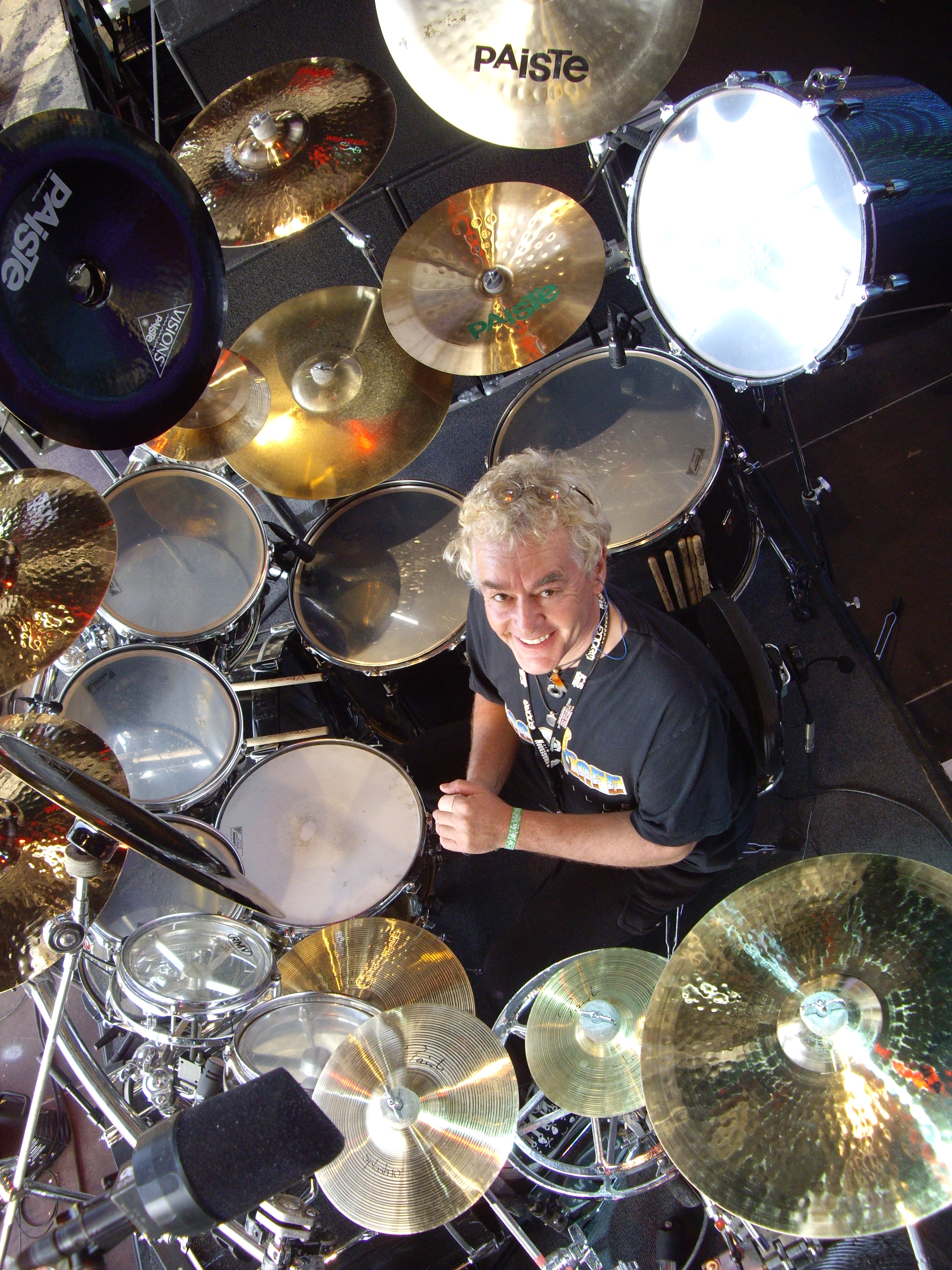
- Glockler in 2007

Background information
- Born: 24 January 1953 (age 73); Hove, East Sussex, England
- Genres: Heavy metal; progressive rock; new wave
- Occupation: Drummer
- Years active: 1980–present
- Member of: Saxon
- Formerly of: GTR; Toyah

Nigel Glockler (born 24 January 1953) is an English musician, best known as the longtime drummer for the heavy metal band Saxon, which he first joined in 1981.

== Career ==
Glockler began his musical career in 1978 as the drummer for the British band Krakatoa, of which Hans Zimmer was a member. In 1981 he joined Toyah, a band fronted by singer Toyah Willcox. At the end of that year, he joined Saxon when previous drummer Pete Gill retired due to an injury. Glockler has been with Saxon since then, except for two temporary absences. He also occasionally plays bass and keyboards for the band.

Glockler first left Saxon in 1987 when he was invited by Steve Howe to join a reformed lineup of the supergroup GTR. That lineup did not release any albums though some songs appeared on later albums by other GTR members. Glockler then returned to Saxon in 1988. In the early-to-mid 1990s he contributed to the albums Turbulence by Steve Howe and Aqua by Asia, plus two albums by The Original Iron Men (featuring former Iron Maiden members Paul Di'Anno and Dennis Stratton). Glockler stayed with Saxon until 1998 when he was forced to temporarily retire due to neck injuries that impeded his drumming.

After receiving medical treatment, Glockler was able to play drums again, first contributing to the album Mad Men and English Dogs with Saxon guitarist Doug Scarratt in 2001. Glockler again rejoined Saxon in 2005 upon the departure of drummer Jörg Michael, and remains with the band to the present day. In late 2014 he survived a brain aneurysm and several surgeries.

== Equipment ==
Glockler currently uses and endorses British Drum Co drums, Canopus snares, Remo drumheads, Wincent drumsticks and is also a longtime endorser of Paiste cymbals.

== Discography ==
=== Saxon ===
- 1982: The Eagle Has Landed
- 1983: Power & the Glory
- 1984: Crusader
- 1985: Innocence Is No Excuse
- 1986: Rock the Nations
- 1989: Rock 'n' Roll Gypsies
- 1990: Greatest Hits Live!
- 1991: Solid Ball of Rock
- 1992: Forever Free
- 1995: Dogs of War
- 1996: The Eagle Has Landed Part II
- 1997: Unleash the Beast
- 2006: The Eagle Has Landed – Part III
- 2007: The Inner Sanctum
- 2009: Into the Labyrinth
- 2011: Call to Arms
- 2012: Heavy Metal Thunder – Live: Eagles Over Wacken
- 2013: Sacrifice
- 2015: Battering Ram
- 2016: Let Me Feel Your Power
- 2018: Thunderbolt
- 2021: Inspirations
- 2022: Carpe Diem
- 2023: More Inspirations
- 2024: Hell, Fire and Damnation

=== Asia ===
- 1992: Aqua
- 1996: Archiva 1
- 1996: Archiva 2

=== Toyah ===
- 1981: Anthem

=== Bernie Tormé and the Electric Gypsies ===
- 1982: Turn Out the Lights

=== Steve Howe ===
- 1991: Turbulence

=== Six By Six ===
- 2022: Six by Six
- 2024: Beyond Shadowland

== Links ==
- Nigel Glockler discography at Discogs
- https://www.allmusic.com/artist/saxon-mn0000259800
- https://web.archive.org/web/20220328104712/https://dedica.la/artist/Nigel+Glockler/biography#.UUYxxj6mmFE
- https://sixbysixband.com/
