= Destiny (Saxon album) =

Studio album by Saxon
- Released: March 1988
- Recorded: 1987
- Studio: Sarm Hook End (Berkshire)
- Genre: Heavy metal
- Length: 43:58
- Label: EMI
- Producer: Stephan Galfas

Saxon chronology
| Rock the Nations (1986) | Destiny (1988) | Rock 'n' Roll Gypsies (1989) |

Singles from Destiny
- 1. "Ride Like the Wind" Released: February 1988; 2. "I Can't Wait Anymore" Released: April 1988

Professional ratings
Review scores
| Source | Rating |
|---|---|
| AllMusic | 1.5/5 stars |
| Classic Rock | 4/10 stars |
| Collector's Guide to Heavy Metal | 4/10 |

Destiny is the ninth studio album by English heavy metal band Saxon, released in March 1988. It is also the only studio album to feature the rhythm section of drummer Nigel Durham (later in Oliver/Dawson Saxon and Morpheus Rising) and bassist Paul Johnson (former Heritage, later in U.S.I. and Demon) on it.

== Background ==
The album was produced by Stephan Galfas (Stryper, Cher, Savatage) and the last studio album Saxon recorded for EMI who dropped the band when the album sales were disappointing. During the tour for this album, Durham and Johnson were sacked and replaced in 1988 by bassist Nibbs Carter and a returning Nigel Glockler on drums who finished the tour.

Durham stated in a 2015 interview with Glenn Milligan of Metalliville that "EMI & the Producer were trying to make the band more commercial and radio friendly and that just isn't Saxon."

The album has been remastered and repackaged several times with various bonuses such as a 12" mix of the single "I Can’t Wait Anymore" plus live B-Sides "Broken Heroes" and "Gonna Shout", both recorded live in Madrid, a live take of "Rock the Nations" recorded at the Hammersmith Odeon, which originally appeared as the B-side to "Ride Like the Wind", and some alternative monitor mixes.

== Track listing ==
Side one
| No. | Title | Writer(s) | Length |
|---|---|---|---|
| 1. | "Ride Like the Wind" (Christopher Cross cover) | Christopher Cross | 4:28 |
| 2. | "Where the Lightning Strikes" | Biff Byford, Paul Quinn, Graham Oliver | 4:19 |
| 3. | "I Can't Wait Anymore" | Byford, Quinn, Oliver | 4:24 |
| 4. | "Calm Before the Storm" | Byford, Quinn, Oliver | 3:46 |
| 5. | "S.O.S." | Byford, Quinn, Oliver | 6:02 |

Side two
| No. | Title | Writer(s) | Length |
|---|---|---|---|
| 6. | "Song for Emma" | Byford, Stephan Galfas | 4:45 |
| 7. | "For Whom the Bell Tolls" | Byford, Quinn, Paul Johnson | 3:54 |
| 8. | "We Are Strong" | Byford, Quinn | 3:55 |
| 9. | "Jericho Siren" | Byford, Quinn, Johnson | 3:36 |
| 10. | "Red Alert" | Byford, Quinn, Johnson | 4:34 |

2010 remaster bonus tracks
| No. | Title | Length |
|---|---|---|
| 11. | "I Can't Wait Anymore," (12" 45 RPM, Single Mix, A1, Remix – Ian Taylor) | 4:50 |
| 12. | "Rock The Nations" (Live at Hammersmith – B-Side Ride Like The Wind, 12", 45 RPM, Maxi-Single, B2) | 4:42 |
| 13. | "Broken Heroes, 12" 45 RPM, Single Mix B1" (Live in Madrid – B-Side I Can't Wait Anymore) | 6:06 |
| 14. | "Gonna Shout 12" 45 RPM, Single Mix, B2" (Live in Madrid – B-Side I Can't Wait Anymore) | 4:38 |
| 15. | "Ride Like The Wind" (Monitor Mix) | 4:25 |
| 16. | "For Whom The Bell Tolls" (Monitor Mix) | 3:59 |

== Personnel ==
Saxon

- Biff Byford – lead vocals
- Graham Oliver – guitars
- Paul Quinn – guitars, synth guitar
- Paul Johnson – bass guitar
- Nigel Durham – drums

Additional musicians

- Stephen Laws Clifford – keyboards
- Dave Taggart, George Lamb, Phil Caffrey, Steve Mann – backing vocals

Production

- Stephan Galfas – producer, mixing, arrangements
- Ian Taylor – mixing
- Spencer Henderson – engineer
- James Allen-Jones – engineer
- Hook and Manor, Berkshire, UK – recording location
- Swanyard Studios, London – mixing location
- Sterling Sound, New York – mastering location

== Charts ==
| Chart (1988) | Peak position |
|---|---|
| Finnish Albums (The Official Finnish Charts) | 33 |
| German Albums (Offizielle Top 100) | 45 |
| Swedish Albums (Sverigetopplistan) | 30 |
| Swiss Albums (Schweizer Hitparade) | 28 |
| UK Albums (Official Charts) | 49 |
