= Live Innocence – The Power & the Glory =

Video by Saxon
- Released: 2003
- Genre: Heavy metal
- Length: 120 minutes
- Label: EMI

Saxon chronology
The Saxon Chronicles (2003)	Live Innocence – The Power & the Glory (2003)	To Hell and Back Again (2007)

Live Innocence – The Power & the Glory is a DVD released by heavy metal band, Saxon, in 2003. This DVD has combined two VHS videos released in the late 80's: Live Innocence released in 1986 and Power & The Glory, The Video Anthology released in 1989.

Much of the Live Innocence performance features songs taken from the album Innocence Is No Excuse released the previous year and which was hailed as their best work since the classic Denim and Leather - here they perform the hard rocking "Play It Loud" from Denim and Leather. The promo clips for "Back on the Streets" and "Rocking Again" are also included at the beginning and end of the concert footage, as well as a thrashing medley of four of their biggest album tracks "Heavy Metal Thunder", "Stand Up and Be Counted", "Taking Your Chances", and "Warrior".

The Video Anthology follows on the DVD featuring each of the video promos that accompanied the singles between 1983 and 1988. There are 7 UK chart hits here which helped Saxon attain 61 weeks in the UK charts during the 80's, including "Power and the Glory", "Northern Lady" and "Ride Like the Wind". Saxon also had 8 top 40 albums during the 80's.

== Track listing ==
Live Innocence 1986
No.	Title	Length
1.	"Back on the Streets" (Promo clip)
2.	"Dallas 1 PM"
3.	"Devil Rides Out"
4.	"Everybody Up"
5.	"A Little Bit of What You Fancy"
6.	"Broken Heroes"
7.	"Play It Loud"
8.	"Shout It Out"
9.	"Crusader"
10.	"Medley: Heavy Metal Thunder, Stand Up and Be Counted, Taking Your Chances, Warrior"
11.	"Rockin' Again" (Promo clip)

The Power & the Glory – The Video Anthology 1983–1988
No.	Title	Length
12.	"Nightmare"
13.	"Suzy Hold On"
14.	"Just Let Me Rock"
15.	"Rockin' Again"
16.	"Back on the Streets"
17.	"Power and the Glory"
18.	"Broken Heroes"
19.	"Everybody Up"
20.	"Northern Lady"
21.	"Rock the Nation"
22.	"Waiting for the Night"
23.	"Rock 'n' Roll Gypsy"
24.	"Ride Like the Wind" (Christopher Cross cover)
25.	"I Can't Wait Anymore"

== Additional notes ==
- Region Code: 1 (US and Canada)
