= Rock 'n' Roll Gypsies =

Live album by Saxon
- Released: November 1989
- Recorded: May 15, 1988
- Venue: Budapest Sports Hall (Budapest)
- Genre: Heavy metal
- Length: 63:51
- Labels: Roadrunner, Enigma
- Producer: Biff Byford

Saxon chronology
Destiny (1988)	Rock 'n' Roll Gypsies (1989)	Greatest Hits Live! (1990)

Professional ratings
Review scores
Source	Rating
AllMusic	2/5 stars

Rock 'n' Roll Gypsies is the second live album by the band Saxon, released in 1989 by Roadrunner Records. It was the first album produced by Biff Byford. In the album's liner notes it is written that the album was "Recorded at Budapest Sports Hall and on the road in Eastern Europe", but the Budapest concert (on May 15, 1988) was the only concert on this tour in Eastern Europe. After the Destiny Europe and US tour from May 3, 1988, til September 3, 1988, Nigel Durham and Paul Johnson played their last Saxon concert at September 3, 1988, at Omni Club, Oakland, California, US. The lineup (with Nigel Glockler and Timothy "Nibbs" Carter) on the cover is the new lineup from 1989, when the album was released, not the lineup from the live performances on the album. In 2001 it was re-released with a different cover and two additional tracks, and with production credited to the whole band and not just to Byford.

== Track listing ==
No.	Title	Length
1.	"Power and the Glory" (P. Byford*, G. Oliver*, P. Quinn*, S. Dawson)"	6:28
2.	"And the Bands Played On" (P. Byford*, G. Oliver*, P. Quinn*, Pete Gill*, S. Dawson)"	2:55
3.	"Rock the Nations" (P. Byford*, G. Oliver*, N. Glocker*, P. Quinn)"	4:31
4.	"Dallas 1PM" (P. Byford*, G. Oliver*, P. Quinn*, Gill*, S. Dawson)"	6:37
5.	"Broken Heroes" (P. Byford*, S. Dawson)"	7:05
6.	"Battle Cry" ( P. Byford*, G. Oliver*, N. Glocker*, P. Quinn )"	5:49
7.	"Rock n' Roll Gypsy" ( P. Byford*, S. Dawson )"	5:18
8.	"Northern Lady" ( P. Byford*, G. Oliver*, N. Glocker*, P. Quinn )"	5:07
9.	"I Can't Wait Anymore" ( P. Byford*, G. Oliver*, P. Quinn )"	4:30
10.	"This Town Rocks" ( P. Byford*, G. Oliver*, P. Quinn*, S. Dawson )"	4:14
11.	"The Eagle Has Landed"	7:26
12.	"Just Let Me Rock"	4:19

"The Eagle Has Landed" and "Just Let Me Rock" are CD bonus tracks.

The Saxon Chronicles, 2015, re-release is a double-disc DVD which now also includes a bonus CD titled Rock’n’Roll Gypsies 1989 Live

== Personnel ==
- Biff Byford – lead vocals
- Graham Oliver – guitars
- Paul Quinn – guitars
- Paul Johnson – bass guitar
- Nigel Durham – drums
