= Saxon (album) =

Studio album by Saxon
- Released: May 1979
- Recorded: January–March 1979
- Studios: Livingston Recording Studios, Barnet, London
- Genres: Heavy metal, hard rock
- Length: 28:54
- Label: Carrere
- Producer: John Verity

Saxon chronology
Saxon (1979)	Wheels of Steel (1980)

Singles from Saxon
- 1. "Big Teaser" Released: 6 July 1979; 2. "Backs to the Wall" Released: 2 November 1979

Saxon is the debut studio album by English heavy metal band Saxon, released in 1979.

== Background ==
John V, credited as the producer and recording engineer, is John Verity, the former guitarist of Argent. Biff Byford and Paul Quinn, while also performing with Saxon’s predecessor band Son of a Bitch, had previously served as touring members of Verity’s band. At the time of the album’s production, the band was still using the name Son of a Bitch, but they released it under the name Saxon after Carrere Records requested a change.

== Reception ==
Professional ratings
Review scores
Source	Rating
AllMusic	3/5 stars
Collector's Guide to Heavy Metal	5/10

Eduardo Rivadavia of AllMusic gave the album three stars out of five, and, in his mixed review, described it as "the quiet before the storm", in terms of the band's subsequent success, and the rising New Wave of British Heavy Metal. Rivadavia also criticized the band's then-lack of experience in the studio as well as their record label, Carrere, for not knowing "how to capture a heavy metal sound on tape", meaning that the album "only hints at Saxon's true personality, power, and songwriting potential". He also said that the progressive rock sounding "Rainbow Theme"/"Frozen Rainbow" and glam rock sounding "Big Teaser" and "Still Fit to Boogie", "suggested some lingering doubts as to musical direction", but that, overall, "the LP helped to put Saxon on the map". Canadian journalist Martin Popoff judged the album "meekly recorded and timid in execution", harkening back to "too many '70s styles, ones that barely fit together" with merely hints of the "more uncompromising forms of metal" Saxon would produce in later years.

== Track listing ==
All tracks are written by Biff Byford, Paul Quinn, Graham Oliver, Steve Dawson and Pete Gill.

Side one
No.	Title	Length
1.	"Rainbow Theme"	3:07
2.	"Frozen Rainbow"	2:29
3.	"Big Teaser"	3:55
4.	"Judgement Day"	5:31

Side two
No.	Title	Length
5.	"Stallions of the Highway"	2:52
6.	"Backs to the Wall"	3:09
7.	"Still Fit to Boogie"	2:53
8.	"Militia Guard"	4:50

2009 remaster bonus tracks
No.	Title	Length
9.	"Big Teaser" (Son of a Bitch demo, 1978)	3:50
10.	"Stallions of the Highway" (Son of a Bitch demo, 1978)	3:03
11.	"Backs to the Wall" (Son of a Bitch demo, 1978)	3:12
12.	"Rainbow Theme" (Son of a Bitch demo, 1978)	4:38
13.	"Frozen Rainbow" (Son of a Bitch demo, 1978)	2:32
14.	"Backs to the Wall" (BBC session)	3:17
15.	"Stallions of the Highway" (BBC session)	2:47
16.	"Motorcycle Man" (BBC session)	3:48
17.	"Still Fit to Boogie" (BBC session)	2:46
18.	"747 (Strangers in the Night)" (BBC session)	5:02
19.	"Judgement Day" (live, b-side "Suzie Hold On")	5:40
20.	"Still Fit to Boogie" (live)	2:38
21.	"Backs to the Wall" (live)	3:25
22.	"Stallions of the Highway" (live)	3:41

- Bonus tracks 14–18, Recorded 1980-01-23, Tommy Vance's Friday Rock Show, transmitted 15 February 1980.
- Bonus tracks 20–22 recorded live at Donington, 1980.

== Personnel ==
Saxon

- Biff Byford – lead vocals
- Graham Oliver – guitars
- Paul Quinn – guitars
- Steve Dawson – bass guitar
- Pete Gill – drums

Production

- John Verity – producer, engineer
- Robert Price – tape operator
- Mike Ford – photography
- Dave Muscroft – photography
- Grafix – album design
- Livingstone Studios, UK – recording and mixing location

== Charts ==
Chart (2018)	Peak position
UK Rock & Metal Albums (Official Charts)	34
