= Unleash the Beast =

- Cover art by Paul R. Gregory

Studio album by Saxon
- Released: May 1997
- Recorded: 1997
- Studios: Karo Studios (Brackel, Germany)
- Genre: Heavy metal
- Length: 53:24
- Labels: CBH/Virgin, CMC International
- Producers: Kalle Trapp, Saxon

Saxon chronology
A Collection of Metal (1996)	Unleash the Beast (1997)	Donnington: The Live Tracks (1997)

Professional ratings
Review scores
Source	Rating
AllMusic	3/5 stars
Collector's Guide to Heavy Metal	7/10
Kerrang!	2/5 stars

Unleash the Beast is the thirteenth studio album by English heavy metal band Saxon, released in 1997. It is their first studio album with Doug Scarratt on guitar.

== Track listing ==
All tracks written by Biff Byford, Nibbs Carter, Nigel Glockler, Paul Quinn, and Doug Scarratt, except where noted.

No.	Title	Writer(s)	Length
1.	"Gothic Dreams"	Byford, Glockler	1:33
2.	"Unleash the Beast"	Byford, Scarratt, Carter, Glockler	5:16
3.	"Terminal Velocity"		4:43
4.	"Circle of Light"	Byford, Scarratt, Carter, Glockler	5:26
5.	"The Thin Red Line"	Byford, Scarratt, Carter, Glockler	6:20
6.	"Ministry of Fools"	Byford, Scarratt, Carter, Glockler	4:29
7.	"The Preacher"		4:55
8.	"Bloodletter"		5:31
9.	"Cut Out the Disease"		5:23
10.	"Absent Friends"		4:54
11.	"All Hell Breaking Loose"	Byford, Quinn, Scarratt, Carter	4:31

== Personnel ==
Saxon

- Biff Byford - lead vocals
- Doug Scarratt - guitars
- Paul Quinn - guitars
- Nibbs Carter - bass guitar
- Nigel Glockler - drums

Production

- Kalle Trapp - producer, mixing
- Saxon - producer
- Karo Studios, Brackel, Germany - recording and mixing location
- Biff Byford - mixing

== Charts ==
Chart (1997)	Peak position
German Albums (Offizielle Top 100)	61
