= Battering Ram (Saxon album) =

Studio album by Saxon
- Released: 16 October 2015
- Recorded: January–March 2015
- Genre: Heavy metal
- Length: 46:30
- Label: UDR Music
- Producer: Andy Sneap

Saxon chronology
Sacrifice (2013)	Battering Ram (2015)	Let Me Feel Your Power (2016)

Professional ratings
Review scores
Source	Rating
About.com	3.5/5 stars
Blabbermouth.net	8/10 stars
Metal-hammer.de	6/7 stars
Stormbringer.at	4.0/5.0 stars

Battering Ram is the twenty-first studio album by British heavy metal band Saxon, released on 16 October 2015.

== Background ==
Saxon frontman Biff Byford stated that the band worked on a new album in January, February and March 2015. On 1 August, the band announced 16 October as the release date of Battering Ram and also premiered the official video of the title track worldwide.

== Track listing ==
All music composed by Saxon, all lyrics written by Biff Byford.

No.	Title	Length
1.	"Battering Ram"	4:56
2.	"The Devil's Footprint"	4:08
3.	"Queen of Hearts"	5:08
4.	"Destroyer"	3:21
5.	"Hard and Fast"	4:45
6.	"Eye of the Storm"	3:54
7.	"Stand Your Ground"	4:15
8.	"Top of the World"	4:00
9.	"To the End"	5:50
10.	"Kingdom of the Cross"	6:08
Total length:		46:30

Deluxe edition
No.	Title	Length
11.	"Three Sheets to the Wind (The Drinking Song)"	3:53
Total length:		50:24

== Personnel ==
Saxon

- Biff Byford – lead vocals
- Paul Quinn – guitars
- Doug Scarratt – guitars
- Nibbs Carter – bass guitar
- Nigel Glockler – drums

Additional musicians

- David Bower – vocals

Production

- Andy Sneap – production
- Paul Raymond Gregory – artwork

== Charts ==
Chart (2015)	Peak position
Austrian Albums (Ö3 Austria)	34
Belgian Albums (Ultratop Flanders)	59
Belgian Albums (Ultratop Wallonia)	78
French Albums (SNEP)	66
German Albums (Offizielle Top 100)	12
Italian Albums (FIMI)	67
Scottish Albums (Official Charts)	29
Swedish Albums (Sverigetopplistan)	13
Swiss Albums (Schweizer Hitparade)	21
UK Albums (Official Charts)	50
UK Independent Albums (Official Charts)	8
UK Rock & Metal Albums (Official Charts)	3
