= Saxon (band) =

British heavy metal band

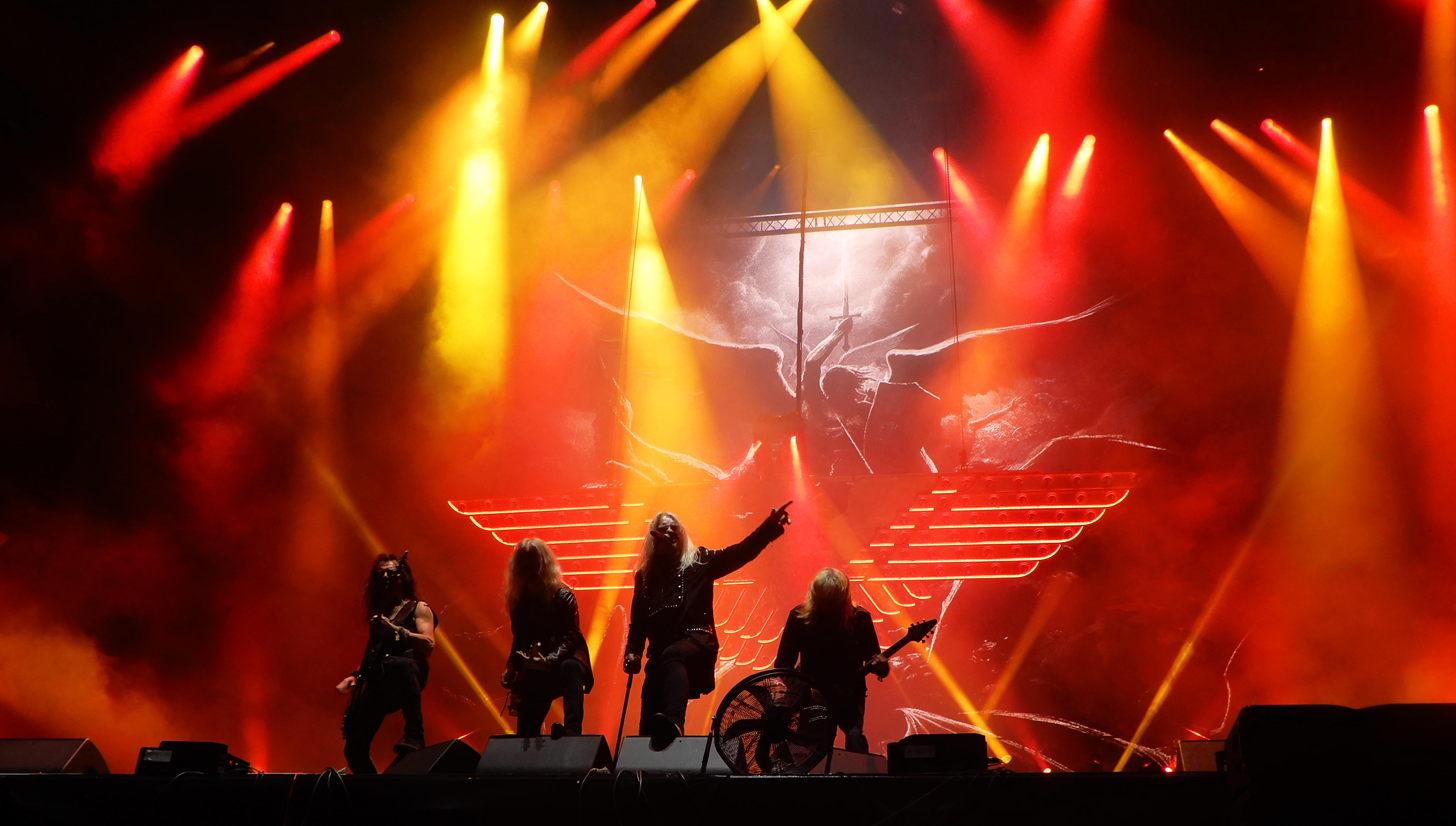
- Saxon performing at Hellfest in 2024

Background information
- Also known as: Son of a Bitch (1975–1978)
- Origin: Barnsley, Yorkshire, England
- Genre: Heavy metal
- Works: Discography
- Years active: 1975–present
- Labels: Silver Lining Music; Militia Guard; SPV/Steamhammer; CMC International; Virgin; EMI; Parlophone; Warner; Carrere
- Members: Biff Byford; Paul Quinn; Nigel Glockler; Nibbs Carter; Doug Scarratt; Brian Tatler
- Past members: Graham Oliver; Steve Dawson; Pete Gill; Paul Johnson; Nigel Durham; Fritz Randow; Jörg Michael
- Website: saxon747.com

Saxon are an English heavy metal band formed in Barnsley in 1975. As leaders of the new wave of British heavy metal (NWOBHM), they had eight UK Top 40 albums in the 1980s, including four UK Top 10 albums and two Top 5 albums. They had numerous hit singles on the UK Singles Chart and achieved success across Europe, South America, and Japan, as well as in the United States and Canada.

During the 1980s, Saxon established themselves among Europe's most successful metal acts. The band tours regularly and have sold more than 23 million records worldwide.

== History ==
=== Formation and early years (1975–1979) ===
Saxon came together from components of two Yorkshire bands: S.O.B. and Coast. The former was initially called Blue Condition, forming in 1970 with Graham Oliver on guitar, Steve "Dobby" Dawson on bass, and John Walker on drums. Their style was blues rock and hard rock. Shifting the line-up, Blue Condition changed their name to S.O.B. in 1974, taking inspiration from the 1969 Free album Tons of Sobs. Meanwhile, Coast was a local rival rock band named after the 1972 song "Coast to Coast" by Trapeze. Coast contained singer and bass player Peter "Biff" Byford, and guitarist Paul Quinn. In 1975, Coast was falling apart, and S.O.B.'s lead singer and guitarist Steve Furth left to go solo, so in November 1975 a new band was formed by S.O.B.'s Oliver, Dawson and Walker, and Coast's Byford and Quinn. Byford became the new lead singer. They adopted the name Son of a Bitch for its more aggressive tone, and they pushed toward a heavier sound. They recorded a demo known as Tapestry in late 1975 and gigged extensively during 1975–1978. Walker quit after a couple of years, and was replaced briefly by Dave Cowell in 1977. Former Glitter Band member Pete Gill soon replaced Cowell as drummer.

In 1978, the band began negotiating with the French disco-oriented record label Carrere Records, run by Freddy Cannon in the UK. Carrere refused the band name Son of a Bitch because it would be impossible to obtain radio airplay, so the band changed their name to Saxon in July, and signed a contract with Carrere in September. They began by supporting established bands such as Motörhead and Ian Gillan Band, and released their first album Saxon in 1979.

=== Success in the UK (1980–1982) ===
Wheels of Steel, released in 1980, charted at No. 5 in the UK Albums Chart. It resulted in two hit songs: the title track and the crowd favourite "747 (Strangers in the Night)". As a result, Saxon began a series of long UK tours. On 16 August, they earned a positive reception at the first Monsters of Rock festival, commemorated by the following year's "And the Bands Played On". Their set was recorded, but not officially released until 2000. In April, Saxon made the first of many appearances on Top of the Pops, performing the hit "Wheels of Steel".

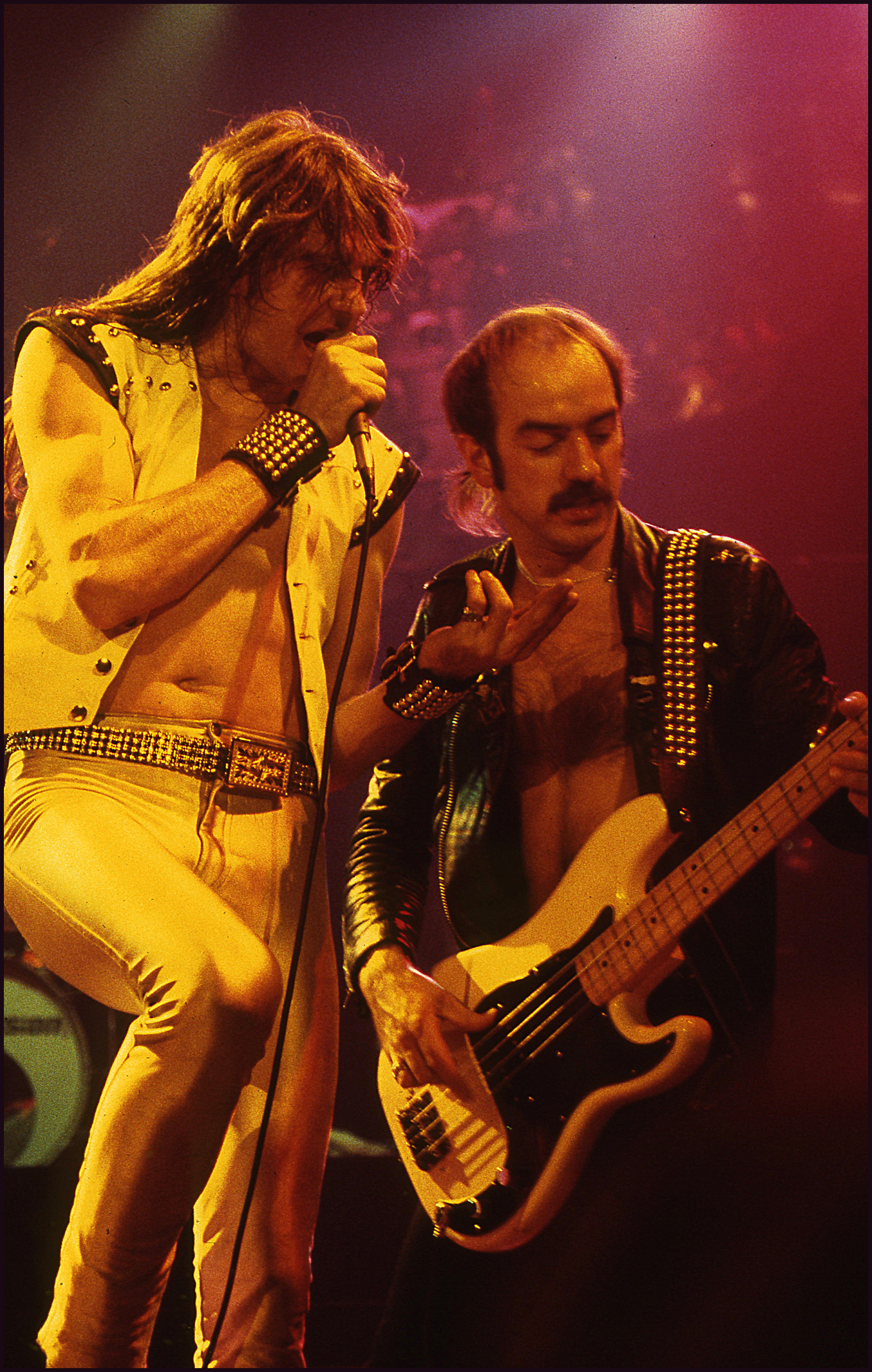
Biff Byford and Steve Dawson performing at Manchester Apollo, 1981

Saxon's third album Strong Arm of the Law was released later in the year, charting at No. 11 in the UK. Two singles were issued: the title track and "Dallas 1PM", the latter about the assassination of U.S. President John F. Kennedy. Sold-out tours of Europe and the UK followed as the album charted in several European countries. The band was also popular in Japan, where the single "Motorcycle Man" stayed in the charts for almost six months.

"On the Strong Arm of the Law tour, in 1981, we met Harry Shearer," Dawson recalled. "We thought he was just an American journalist. He spent three days on the road with us. [When] we all went to see This Is Spinal Tap, I didn't recognise Harry. I was too busy laughing my head off. But some of the other guys didn't see the funny side."

In 1981, the band released their fourth album Denim and Leather, dedicated to their fan base. Still popular today, its title track "Denim and Leather" is regarded as a heavy metal anthem. The album also featured fan favourites such as "Princess of the Night", "Never Surrender", and "And the Bands Played On" – all UK Top 20 hits. Denim and Leather followed its predecessor's success and went Gold in several European countries, including the UK. By this time, the band was seen as the leaders of the NWOBHM movement, with future bands Iron Maiden and Def Leppard following close behind.

Just as the band was to embark on a long tour to follow the success of Denim and Leather, drummer Pete Gill left, after injuring his hand. The band quickly replaced him with Nigel Glockler, formerly of Toyah, who had to learn the entire set within a day and a half. Glockler is still with the band today.

Headlining tours around the UK and a sold-out tour in Europe with support act Ozzy Osbourne resulted in The Eagle Has Landed (1982, UK No. 5). It was planned as a double album, but the record company decided to release it as a single live album, despite protests from the band. Saxon also played the Monsters of Rock festival again in 1982, becoming the first band to appear there twice.

=== Power & the Glory and EMI years (1983–1987) ===
As the NWOBHM movement began to fade, 1983's Power & the Glory, their best-selling album to date, saw Saxon confirmed as one of the leading metal acts in Europe, along with Iron Maiden and Judas Priest. The "Power and Glory Tour" was an arena tour that began in Europe and was a huge success. The US leg of the tour, as special guest to Iron Maiden, along with Fastway, proved to be successful and Saxon found themselves becoming a major act in the US as the album, in its first week of release, sold more than 15,000 copies in Los Angeles alone. The cover art of the album was produced by Hollywood film director Ridley Scott.

In late 1983, Saxon left Carrere and signed with EMI Records in 1984, with their first release on the label being Crusader. Though still heavy, critics felt the album had a more commercial sound, and fans began to wonder what direction the band was taking. Despite its commercial sound, the title track became a fan favourite. The album sold over two million copies and the 1984 world tour "The World Crusade" was a success both in Europe and America. In the US, the band toured with Accept as their special guests, as well as supporting Mötley Crüe for some shows of a yearlong tour.

With the release of Innocence Is No Excuse in 1985, the band continued to take a more commercial direction, and this divided fans as the band's once raw, heavy sound had been watered down for the large US market. A huge sold out world tour in support of the album followed, but tensions began to appear within the band and, by early 1986, bassist Steve Dawson was fired, and Saxon was forced to record their eighth studio album Rock the Nations without a replacement. With Elton John making guest appearances as pianist on two tracks, and Byford recording the bass parts, the album charted higher than its predecessor and was considered a success. They hired bassist Paul Johnson to play for the band's European arena tour that followed. In the summer of 1986, Saxon headlined the Reading Festival and toured the United States.

In 1987, the band took time off from the constant touring and recording that had begun in the mid 1970s, and only a minor tour of the U.S. and Canada was scheduled. In early 1987, Nigel Glockler left the band and was replaced by Nigel Durham.

=== Decline of fan base and continued European success (1988–1993) ===
The band found it hard to attain chart success in America; the release of Destiny (1988) did not change this, and Saxon were later dropped by EMI. In 1988, Paul Johnson was replaced by Nibbs Carter. Nigel Glockler also decided to return to the band. 1989 saw the release of Rock n Roll Gypsies, a live album recorded on an arena tour of eastern Europe in 1988, but by this time, the gigs at the big stadiums and arenas of Europe and the US were few and far between and, with no record deal, Saxon's future was uncertain.

The band eventually decided to embark on a European tour titled "10 Years of Denim and Leather" which proved to be a successful move as the band was re-established as a popular act. In 1990, they signed to Virgin Records and started work on their new album Solid Ball of Rock, which was released in 1991 and proved to be successful. In 1992, Saxon sustained this success with the release of Forever Free. The album was produced by Biff Byford and Herwig Ursin. A UK version of the album featured an alternate cover with a "Space Marine" from the Warhammer 40,000 tabletop wargame. "Iron Wheels" was released as a single. The song was written about and dedicated to Byford's father who worked in the coal mines of Yorkshire.

=== Departure of Graham Oliver and return to heavier sound (1994–2002) ===
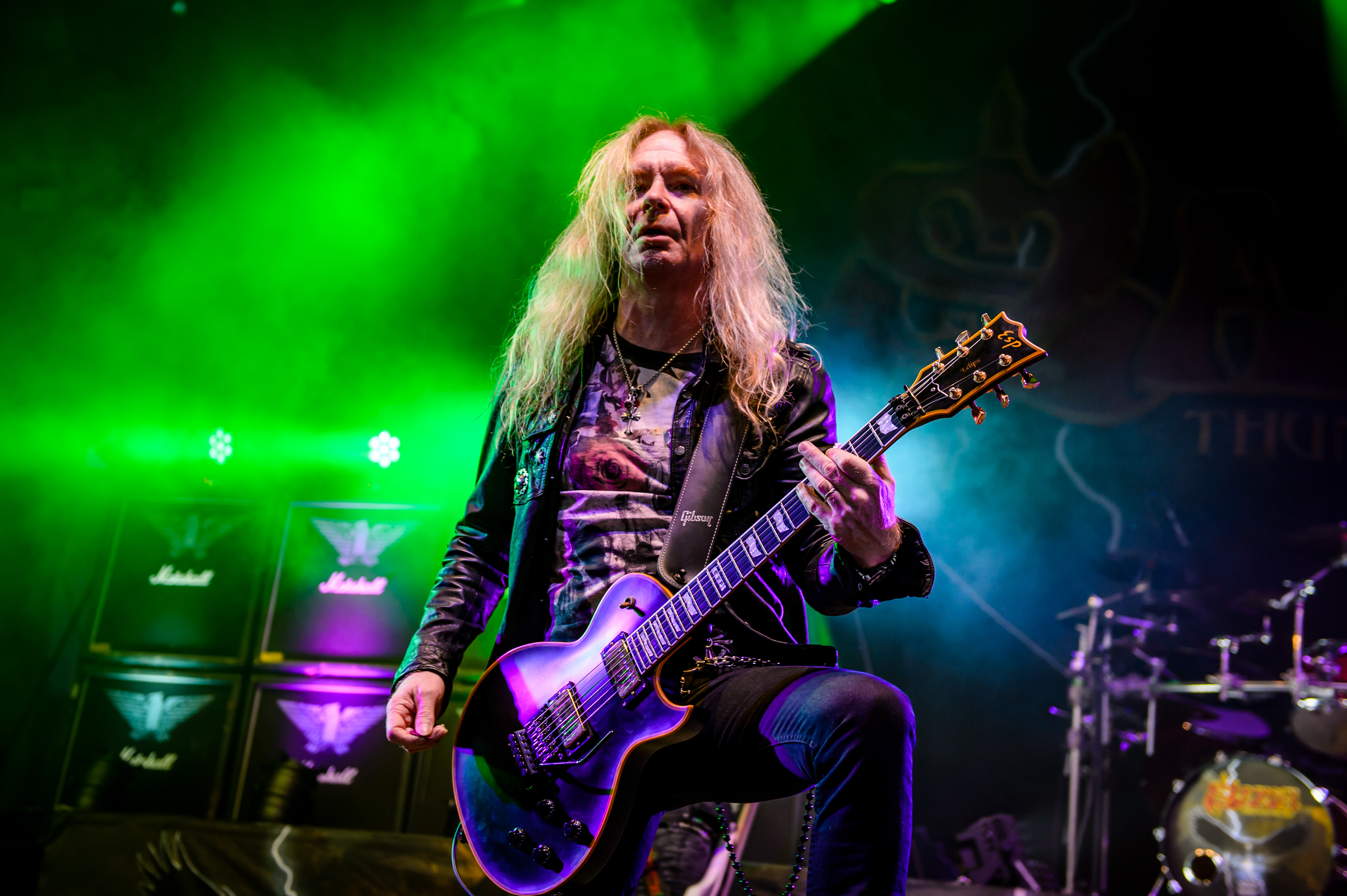
Doug Scarratt joined the band in 1996

During 1994, Saxon recorded the album Dogs of War. Shortly afterwards, Graham Oliver was fired by the band in 1996. The band replaced Oliver with Doug Scarratt, a longtime friend of drummer Nigel Glockler. Saxon recorded a new music video for Dogs of War. 1996 saw the release of another live album, The Eagle Has Landed Pt II. They also recorded a cover of the Judas Priest song "You've Got Another Thing Comin'", for a tribute album entitled A Tribute to Judas Priest: Legends of Metal.

Saxon released Unleash the Beast, produced by Kalle Trapp and Saxon, in 1997. Saxon began their Unleash The Beast tour in May, where they played in Europe. Unleash the Beast reached the top 100 in the charts in Sweden, Germany and Switzerland. In November, they played two gigs in Brazil (São Paulo and Santos) and ended the year with a Christmas show in Belgium. In 1998, the band toured the US, as well as playing the Brazilian Monsters of Rock. After relentless touring, drummer Nigel Glockler took time off to recover from a neck and shoulder injury and was temporally replaced by Fritz Randow.

September 1999 saw the release of Metalhead. The album was praised in Germany where Saxon had begun to play the Wacken Open Air Festival, where they later became a regular fixture. Saxon also headlined the first Bloodstock Festival in the UK. In 2001, they again headlined the Wacken Open Air Festival and recorded the live DVD "Saxon Chronicles". Saxon also released the album Killing Ground during the same year. In 2002, Saxon released Heavy Metal Thunder, a compilation album featuring re-recorded versions of songs from the band's biggest selling albums.

=== Battle for band name and Lionheart (2003–2006) ===
In 1999, former members Graham Oliver and Steven Dawson registered 'Saxon' as a trademark. They then maintained that they had exclusive rights to the name and tried to prevent Biff Byford and Saxon's promoters and merchandisers from using the name. Byford applied to the Trade Mark Registry to have the trademark declared invalid. He applied on the basis that the registration had been obtained in bad faith and that he was entitled to prevent use of the trademark by bringing an action for 'passing off', that is an action to stop others misrepresenting themselves as Saxon. In 2003, the High Court declared that it was Byford and the current members of the band who owned the name, and were therefore in a position to prevent Oliver and Dawson passing themselves off as Saxon. After this Oliver and Dawson renamed their band Oliver/Dawson Saxon.

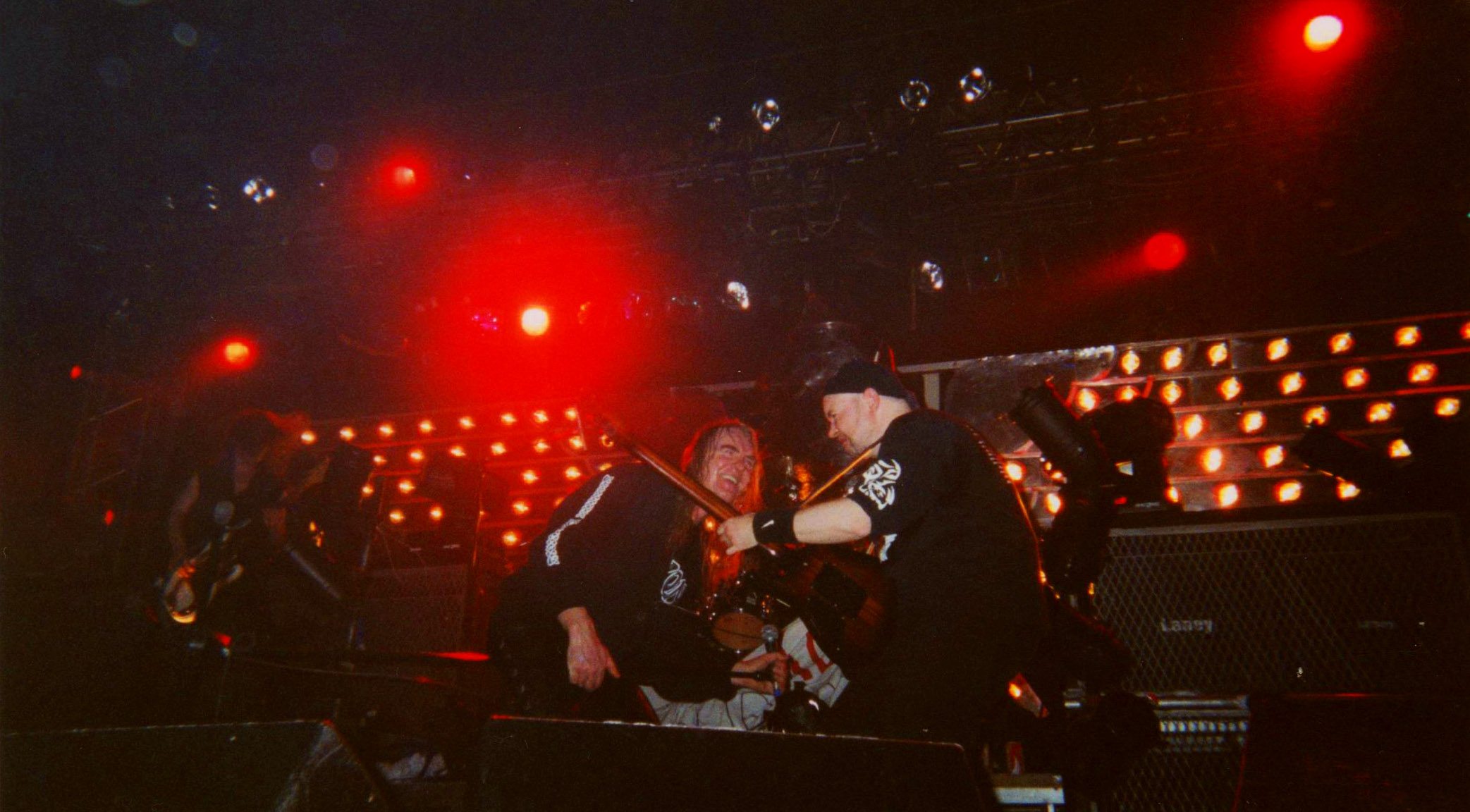
Saxon performing in Paris, 2003

Fritz Randow left the band in 2004. His replacement was former Stratovarius member Jörg Michael. 2004 also saw the release of Lionheart their 16th studio album. The album title was inspired from Richard Lionheart, King of England. "Beyond the Grave" was released as a single and a music video. The album received positive reviews and the title track remains a fan favourite. Nigel Glockler rejoined the band in 2005. In 2006, the band released the live album, The Eagle Has Landed – Part III. The band were due to play that year's Dubai Desert Rock Festival and perform alongside Megadeth. Just before the band were due to play Dubai's Department of Tourism and Commerce Marketing had withdrawn the band's permission to play the festival. It was rumoured that the historical lyrics in Crusader were the reason for this.

=== Re-establishment in the UK (2007–2010) ===
In 2007, Saxon were the subject of an episode of Harvey Goldsmith's Get Your Act Together. As part of his programme, Goldsmith wanted to try and restore their popularity and reputation. He drafted in two new producers to oversee the production of a new single "If I Was You" (a song about gun culture), which went to number one in the Rock Charts in over 10 countries (becoming their most successful single for over 12 years). At the end of the programme, Saxon played at the half sold out Sheffield City Hall. Saxon also performed at the 2008 Download Festival.

Saxon's The Inner Sanctum album, released in Europe on 5 March 2007, and North America on 3 April, was seen by critics as their best work in years. The band then started a world tour in support of the album.

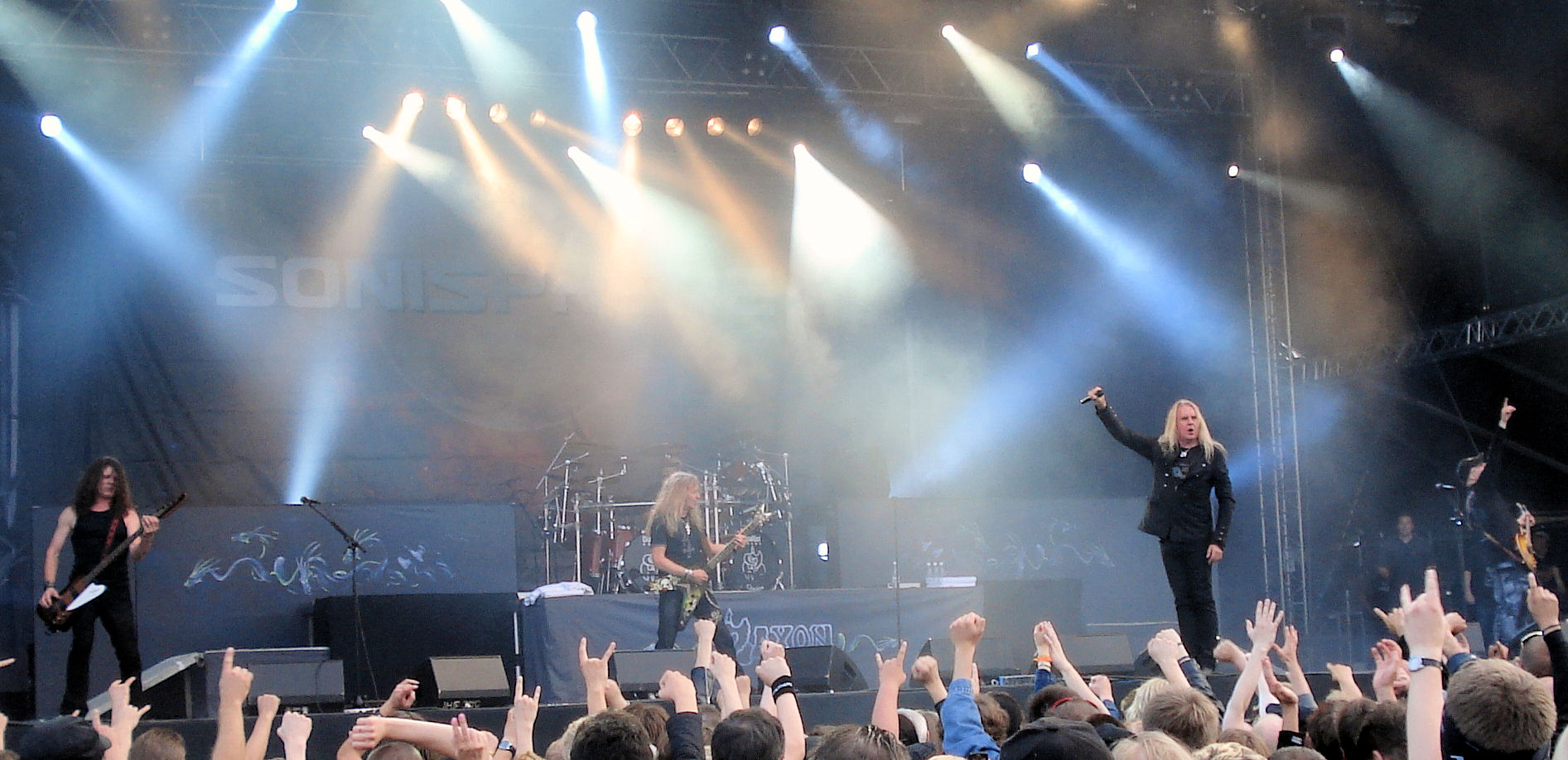
Saxon performing at 2009 Sonisphere Festival in Pori, Finland

Saxon released a new studio album, Into the Labyrinth, on 12 January 2009. The album received positive reviews and continued the success that The Inner Sanctum had created. The band also headlined the Wacken Open Air Festival in Germany. In February, it was announced that the band were cancelling the Spanish leg of their European tour with Iced Earth, due to scheduling issues. At the start of 2009, they toured the UK with Doro, and again at the end of the year they did a UK tour, co-headlining with Motorhead. In August of that year, they played at Sonisphere. In September Saxon announced the release of Heavy Metal Thunder - The Movie, a documentary on the band's history from the beginning.

Continuing their success in the UK, Saxon performed at the 2010 Download Festival, which took place at Donington Park between 11 and 13 June. The band played the Wheels of Steel album in its entirety to mark the 30th anniversary of its release.

=== Call to Arms and Sacrifice (2011–2014) ===
Saxon released their nineteenth studio album, Call to Arms, on 3 June 2011. It debuted at number 6 on the UK Rock Albums chart. The band embarked on a world tour which saw them visit the US; Saxon also revisited the UK for a second leg of the tour. The band announced on their Call To Arms tour that a number of fans at each venue, each paying £10, would be able to watch them soundcheck. This was donated to the Nordoff Robbins Music Therapy and Childline charities.

Saxon were billed as special guests supporting Judas Priest at Hammersmith Apollo on 26 May 2012. Saxon also played Download Festival 2012, and were recorded playing "Wheels of Steel" for the festival's Highlights show shown on Sky Arts. On 13 February 2012, the band announced that they were releasing a new live DVD and CD package entitled Heavy Metal Thunder - Live: Eagles Over Wacken, which compiled their 2004, 2007 and 2009 performances at the Wacken Open Air across various formats. In March, Saxon won the Metal Hammer 2012 Golden God award for 'Best UK band'.

They played at Wacken Open Air in August 2012. In October, the band announced that their next studio album would be titled Sacrifice and it was released in March 2013. On 11 December 2012 Heavy Metal Thunder - The Movie saw an international release and was the first Blu-ray release for the band. 2013 also saw the release of a new compilation album Unplugged and Strung Up. 2014 saw the release of a new live album named St. George's Day Sacrifice - Live in Manchester. The band also embarked on a tour in October of that year named Warriors of the Road.

=== Battering Ram, Thunderbolt, Inspirations, Carpe Diem (2015–2022) ===
During an interview in November 2014, Biff Byford revealed that: "We're making the new album in January, February and March". In a March 2015 interview, Byford described the album as a mixture of rock and roll and heavy metal. When asked about a possible release date, Byford said: "We're looking at maybe at a summer release. It just depends on whether it's ready or not. We're looking at finishing the album by the end of April. We're keeping our fingers crossed."

On 1 August 2015, the band announced 16 October as the release date of Battering Ram and also premiered the official video of the title track.

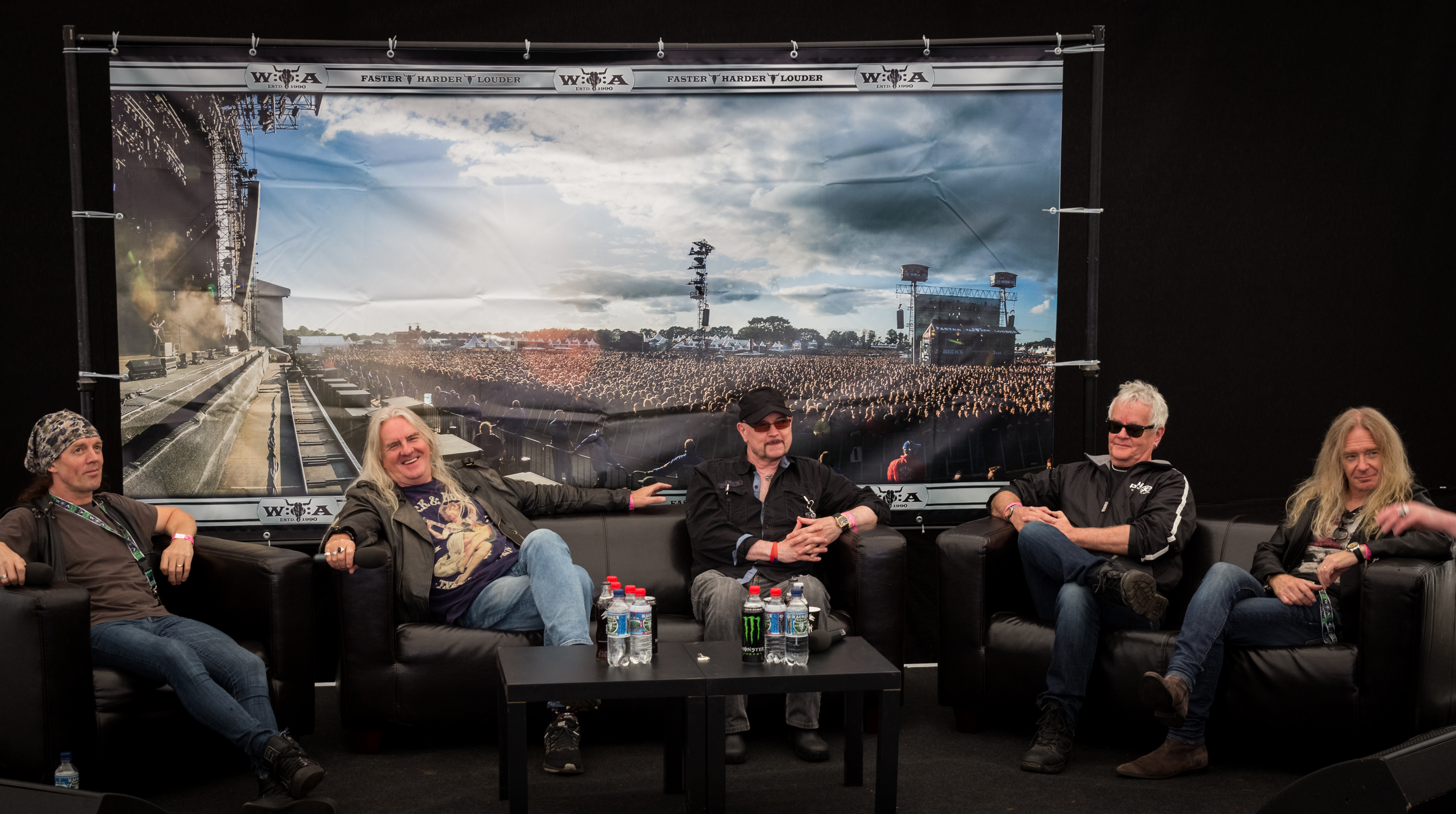
Saxon at press conference Wacken Open Air 2016

On 14 September 2016, Biff Byford announced on Facebook that Saxon were working on a new album with producer Andy Sneap, for an early 2017 release. In October 2016, the band announced a tour in the U.S. for the early spring of 2017 with UFO. In a 16 March 2017 interview with former Anthrax vocalist Neil Turbin on Canada's The Metal Voice in Los Angeles, California, Biff Byford gave an update on the new album saying that several songs were already recorded with a few more to complete, with an estimated release date for early 2018.

On 15 June 2017, Byford revealed that the title of their new studio album was Thunderbolt. Saxon and UFO teamed up again for another round of shows in North America for the fall. On 7 November 2017, the band announced that the album would be officially released on 2 February 2018. To support the album, they briefly toured Europe and the UK with Diamond Head, Rock Goddess and Magnum from late February to early March 2018, and were the support act along with Black Star Riders for Judas Priest's Firepower World Tour from mid March to early May 2018.

Saxon released their first covers album Inspirations on 19 March 2021. Their 24th studio album Carpe Diem, was released on 4 February 2022, with the band embarking on the Seize The Day tour in support of the album.

=== More Inspirations, Hell, Fire and Damnation and Gods of Thunder (2023–present) ===
The follow-up covers album More Inspirations was released on 24 March 2023, with a further new studio album to be released in 2024. During this time, Saxon toured Europe with German thrash metal band Rage as support.

On 10 March 2023, the band announced guitarist Paul Quinn's retirement from touring, although they stated that he would continue his work in the studio. Diamond Head guitarist Brian Tatler was announced as their touring guitarist, but would continue to remain a member of his main band. Byford said that the band began the demo sessions for the next album. The resulting album titled Hell, Fire and Damnation was released on 19 January 2024. Saxon promoted the album by joining Judas Priest and Uriah Heep on the European Metal Masters tour in the spring of 2024, followed by a headlining North American tour (again with Uriah Heep). Tatler has since become a permanent member.

In February 2025, Byford revealed that Saxon have begun writing new material for their next album, which they plan to release around late 2026. In 2025, the band participated in the Hell's Heroes music festival held at the White Oak Music Hall in Houston. On 20 July, 2026, Saxon revealed the album's title, Gods of Thunder, scheduled for a January 2027 release.

On 24 October 2026, it was announced that former drummer Nigel Durham had died. He was 61.

== Legacy ==
Saxon have been cited as a major influence or inspiration by numerous bands, including Mötley Crüe, Metallica, Megadeth, Slayer, Anthrax, Pantera, Testament, Dokken, Skid Row, Dream Theater, Exodus, Overkill, King Diamond and Celtic Frost.

Saxon also proved influential on the 1984 satirical film This Is Spinal Tap. On the band's 1980 tour, actor and musician Harry Shearer "persuaded the band to let him tag along as a sort of embedded observer" according to an account by director Rob Reiner. Armed with this experience, Shearer went on to play the role of bassist Derek Smalls in the mockumentary film's titular heavy metal band.

== Band members ==
=== Current members ===
Image	Name	Years active	Instruments	Release contributions
	Biff Byford	1975–present	lead vocals; occasional acoustic guitar; bass (1986)	all releases
	Paul Quinn	1975–present (not touring since 2023)	guitars; occasional backing vocals	all releases
	Nigel Glockler	1981–1999; 2005–present	drums	all releases from The Eagle Has Landed (1983) to Unleash the Beast (1997), except Destiny (1988) and from The Eagle Has Landed – Part III (2006) onwards; BBC Sessions (1998) unspecified tracks; Live Innocence – The Power & the Glory (2003)
	Nibbs Carter	1988–present	bass; backing vocals	all releases from Rock 'n' Roll Gypsies (1989), except Donnington: The Live Tracks (1997)
	Doug Scarratt	1996–present	guitars	all releases from The Eagle Has Landed – Part II (1996) onwards, except Donnington: The Live Tracks (1997)
	Brian Tatler	2022–present	guitars	Hell, Fire and Damnation (2024), Gods Of Thunder (2027)

=== Former members ===
Image	Name	Years active	Instruments	Release contributions
	Graham Oliver	1975–1996	guitars	all releases from Saxon (1979) to Dogs of War (1995); Donnington: The Live Tracks (1997); BBC Sessions (1998); Live Innocence – The Power & the Glory (2003)
	Steve Dawson	1975–1986	bass; backing vocals	all releases from Saxon (1979) to Innocence Is No Excuse (1985); Donnington: The Live Tracks (1997); BBC Sessions (1998); Live Innocence – The Power & the Glory (2003)
	John Walker	1975–1977	drums	none
	Pete Gill	1977–1981	drums	all releases from Saxon (1979) to; Denim and Leather (1981); Donnington: The Live Tracks (1997); BBC Sessions (1998) unspecified tracks
	Paul Johnson	1986–1988	bass	Rock the Nations (1986) credit only; Destiny (1988)
	Nigel Durham	1987–1988; died 2026	drums	Destiny (1988)
	Fritz Randow	1999–2004	drums	Metalhead (1999); Killing Ground (2001); The Vinyl Hoard (2016)
	Jörg Michael	2004–2005	drums	The Saxon Chronicles (2003); Lionheart (2004); The Eagle Has Landed – Part III (2006) 19 tracks; To Hell and Back Again (2007)

=== Temporary musicians ===
Image	Name	Years active	Instruments	Notes
	Dave Cowell	1977	drums	Cowell replaced Walker before Gill arrived.
	Rainer Hänsel	1995	guitars	Hänsel replaced Graham Oliver on the Dogs of War recording.
	Trevor Thornton	1998	drums	Thornton replaced the injured Nigel Glockler on the second leg of the Unleash The Beast tour
	Yenz Leonhardt	2010	bass; backing vocals	Leonhardt replaced Nibbs Carter on the 2010 European tour.
	Sven Dirkschneider	2015	drums	Son of Udo Dirkschneider; sat in for Nigel Glockler on the Warriors of the Road tour on four shows only.

== Discography ==
Studio albums

- Saxon (1979)
- Wheels of Steel (1980)
- Strong Arm of the Law (1980)
- Denim and Leather (1981)
- Power & the Glory (1983)
- Crusader (1984)
- Innocence Is No Excuse (1985)
- Rock the Nations (1986)
- Destiny (1988)
- Solid Ball of Rock (1991)
- Forever Free (1992)
- Dogs of War (1995)
- Unleash the Beast (1997)
- Metalhead (1999)
- Killing Ground (2001)
- Lionheart (2004)
- The Inner Sanctum (2007)
- Into the Labyrinth (2009)
- Call to Arms (2011)
- Sacrifice (2013)
- Battering Ram (2015)
- Thunderbolt (2018)
- Carpe Diem (2022)
- Hell, Fire and Damnation (2024)
- Gods of Thunder (2027)

Cover albums

- Inspirations (2021)
- More Inspirations (2023)

== See also ==
- List of new wave of British heavy metal bands
