= The Eagle Has Landed – Part II =

Live album by Saxon
- Released: 14 July 1996
- Recorded: December 1995
- Genre: Heavy metal
- Length: 96:11
- Label: CBH/Virgin
- Producers: Biff Byford, Rainer Hänsel

Saxon chronology
Dogs of War (1995)	The Eagle Has Landed – Part II (1996)	A Collection of Metal (1996)

Professional ratings
Review scores
Source	Rating
AllMusic	2/5 stars
Collector's Guide to Heavy Metal	7/10

The Eagle Has Landed – Part II is a double live album by the English heavy metal band Saxon. It is the fourth live album by the band and the first recording to feature Doug Scarratt instead of Graham Oliver, who had left just after the release of Dogs of War.

== Track listing ==
Disc one
No.	Title	Length
1.	"Warlord" (intro)	2:19
2.	"Dogs of War"	4:52
3.	"Forever Free"	4:49
4.	"Requiem (We Will Remember)"	5:55
5.	"Crusader"	5:57
6.	"Light in the Sky"	4:30
7.	"Iron Wheels"	4:18
8.	"Ain't Gonna Take It"	4:44
9.	"Crash Drive"	4:22
10.	"Refugee"	6:02

Disc two
No.	Title	Length
1.	"Solid Ball of Rock"	5:03
2.	"The Great White Buffalo"	6:32
3.	"The Eagle Has Landed"	7:37
4.	"Princess of the Night"	5:16
5.	"Can't Stop Rockin'"	4:40
6.	"Denim and Leather"	6:19
7.	"Wheels of Steel / Demolition Alley"	12:53

== Personnel ==
Saxon

- Biff Byford - lead vocals, producer
- Paul Quinn - guitars
- Doug Scarratt - guitars
- Nibbs Carter - bass guitar
- Nigel Glockler - drums

Guest musicians

- Yngwie Malmsteen - guitar on "Denim and Leather"

Production

- Rainer Hänsel - producer
- Thomas Kukuck, Hans Jürgen Steffen - engineers
