= And the Bands Played On =

Single by Saxon

from the album Denim and Leather
- Released: 27 March 1981
- Recorded: 1981
- Genre: Heavy metal
- Length: 2:48 (album version) 2:53 (7" single version)
- Label: Capitol
- Songwriter: Saxon
- Producer: Nigel Thomas

Saxon singles chronology
"Strong Arm of the Law" (1980)	"And the Bands Played On" (1981)	"Never Surrender" (1981)

"And the Bands Played On" is a single by heavy metal band Saxon from their 1981 album Denim and Leather. It peaked at number 12 on the UK Singles Chart and is Saxon's most successful single to date. The album version has a cold ending at 2:48, but the single version continues slightly longer to 2:53 and has a fade ending. The 7" single version has yet to appear on CD.

The lyrics, written by singer Biff Byford, are about Saxon's performance at the Monsters of Rock festival in 1980.

== Personnel ==
- Biff Byford – vocals
- Graham Oliver – guitar
- Paul Quinn – guitar
- Steve Dawson – bass guitar
- Pete Gill – drums
