= Biff Byford =

British rock vocalist (born 1951)

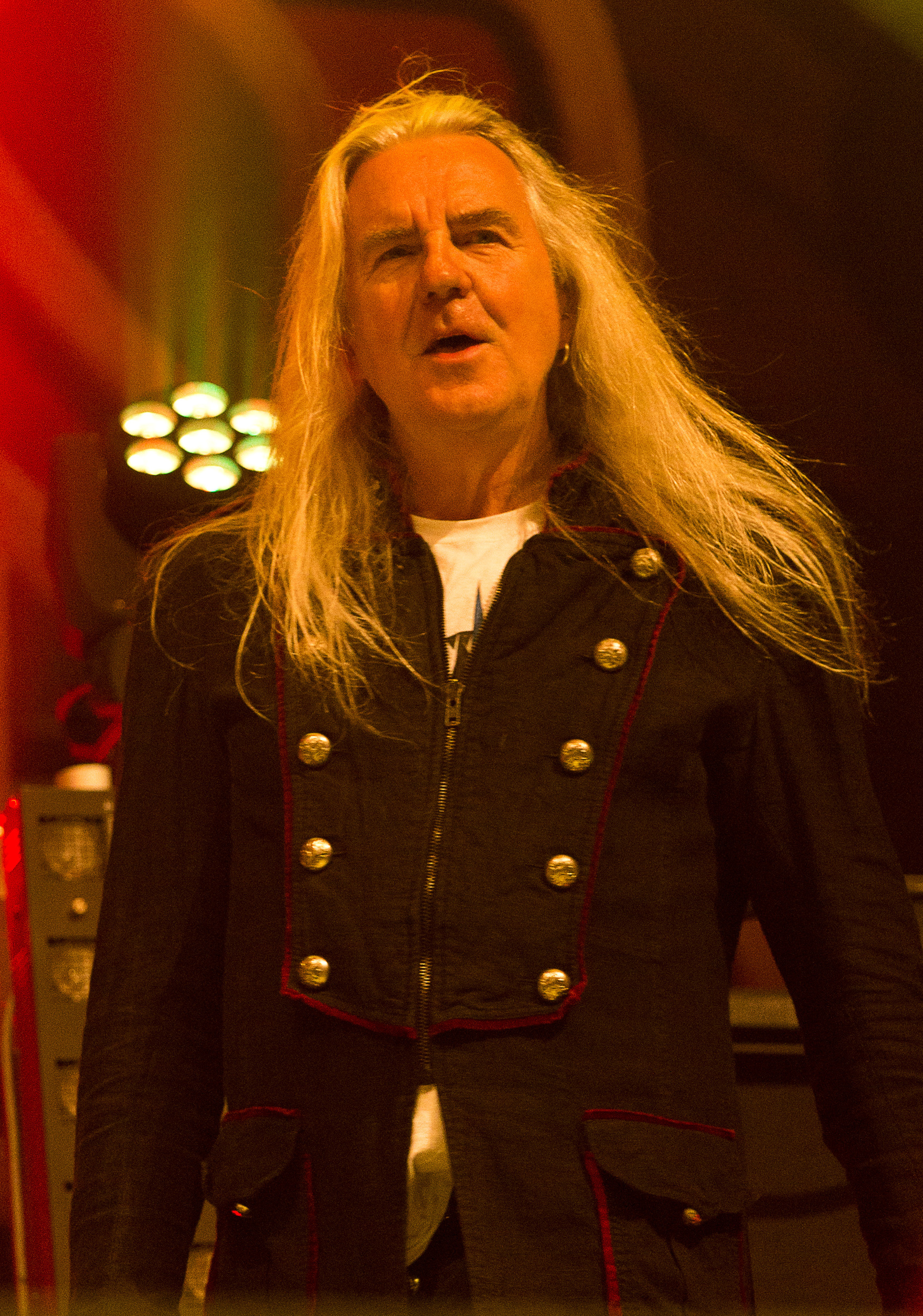
- Byford in 2016

Background information
- Born: Peter Rodney Byford; 15 January 1951 (age 75); Skelmanthorpe, England
- Genres: Heavy metal, hard rock
- Occupation: Singer
- Years active: 1970–present
- Member of: Saxon
- Formerly of: Avantasia, Coast, Jumble Lane

Peter Rodney "Biff" Byford (born 15 January 1951) is an English singer best known as the lead vocalist of the heavy metal band Saxon.

== Early life ==
Byford was born in Skelmanthorpe, West Yorkshire, the youngest of four children to Ernest Charles and Irene Byford. He has a brother, a half-sister from his father's side, Enid, who is 20 years older than him, and a half-brother Michael from his mother.

Byford was just 11 years old when his mother died. "Being so young," he says, "it was a crushing blow. But that, I think, is when that will to survive was built in."

Only two years later his father, whom Byford describes as a violent alcoholic, suffered a terrible accident while at work at a textile mill, losing an arm after it was entangled in a piece of heavy machinery.

He joined a youth club band at 14. When he was 15, in 1966, having left school to work as a junior carpenter, his first steady girlfriend, Linda, fell pregnant. They were promptly married. But the marriage did not last, even though the couple had two children.

At 18, in 1969, he was employed at the Shuttle Eye pit at Flockton, near Huddersfield. At six-foot-one, he was considered too tall to work underground, in tunnels only three feet high. So instead he worked in the boiler house, manning a giant steam engine that drew up the coal from a mile deep.

== Career ==
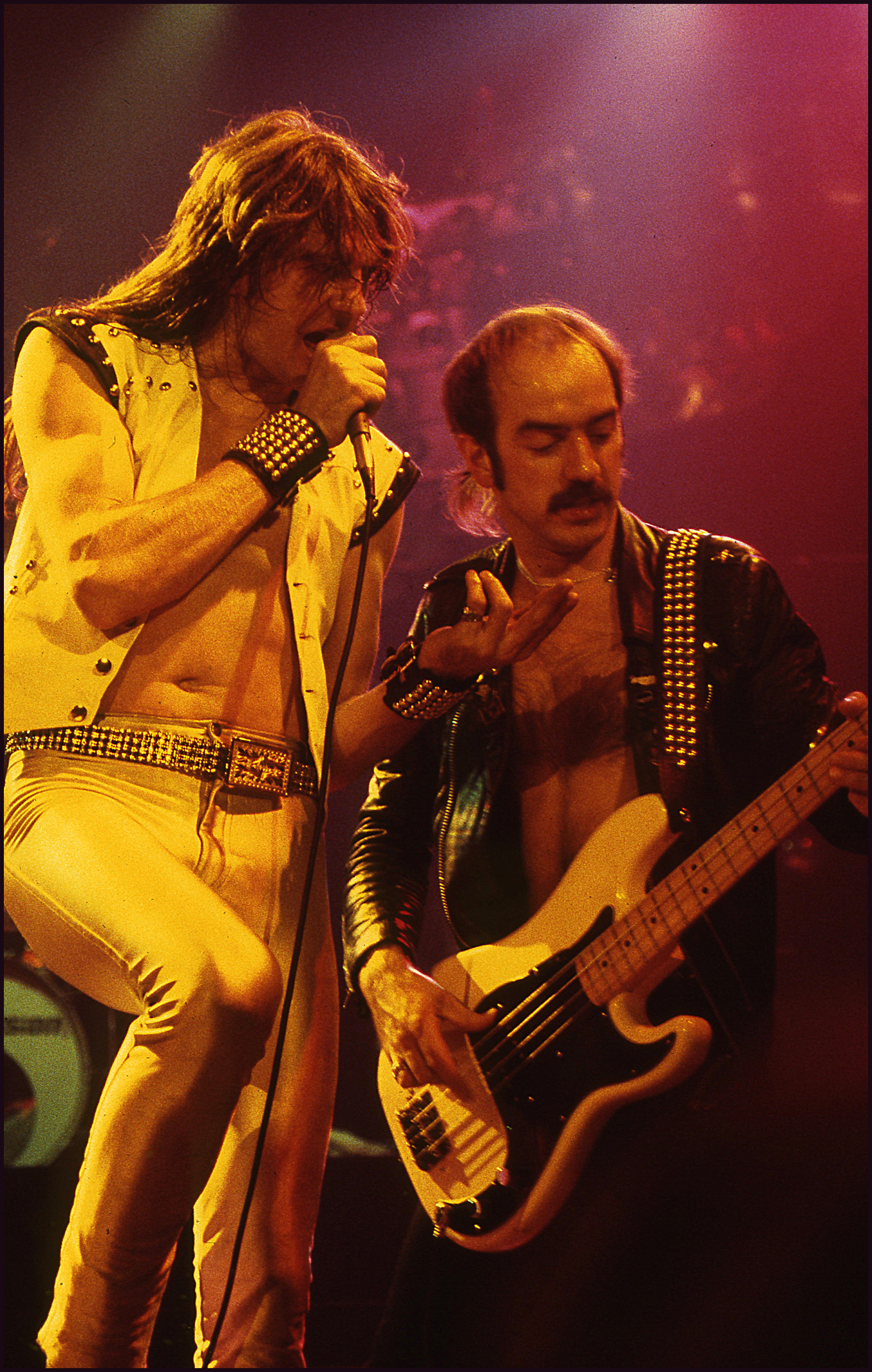
Byford (left) and Steve Dawson with Saxon in 1981

He was taught to play guitar by his best friend's brother, who led a local blues group. Byford switched to bass, and passed through various bands in the Barnsley area. His first appearance on an album was in 1971 when he played flute and wrote a few of the songs on the self titled debut album by psychedelic rockers Jumble Lane, a Holyground Records release. He started singing backing vocals when he joined the Iron Mad Wilkinson Band, named after a local industrialist.

Byford sang and played bass with a local power trio called Coast from around 1973 to 1976 along with drummer Al Dodd and future Saxon guitarist Paul Quinn, when he formed Saxon with guitarists Graham Oliver and Paul Quinn, bassist Steve Dawson and former Glitter Band drummer Pete Gill. The band was originally called Son of a Bitch, but changed to Saxon in 1978. They released their self-titled debut album in 1979, and became part of what was known as the new wave of British heavy metal, which also included bands such as Iron Maiden, Diamond Head and Def Leppard. The band had commercial success as well, charting eight consecutive UK Top 40 albums and five Top 40 singles between 1980 and 1986.

At the end of the 1980s, the band declined in popularity, with 1988's Destiny being their last UK charting album until 2007. Oliver and Dawson left the band and formed a new band with the same name, though they were later forced to change it to Oliver/Dawson Saxon. (Byford's) Saxon maintained a recording and touring career centred on Germany for much of the 1990s, during 1998-1999, Gill took employment with a West Yorkshire kitchen furniture manufacturer as a salesman, before coming back into broader attention with 2007's The Inner Sanctum.

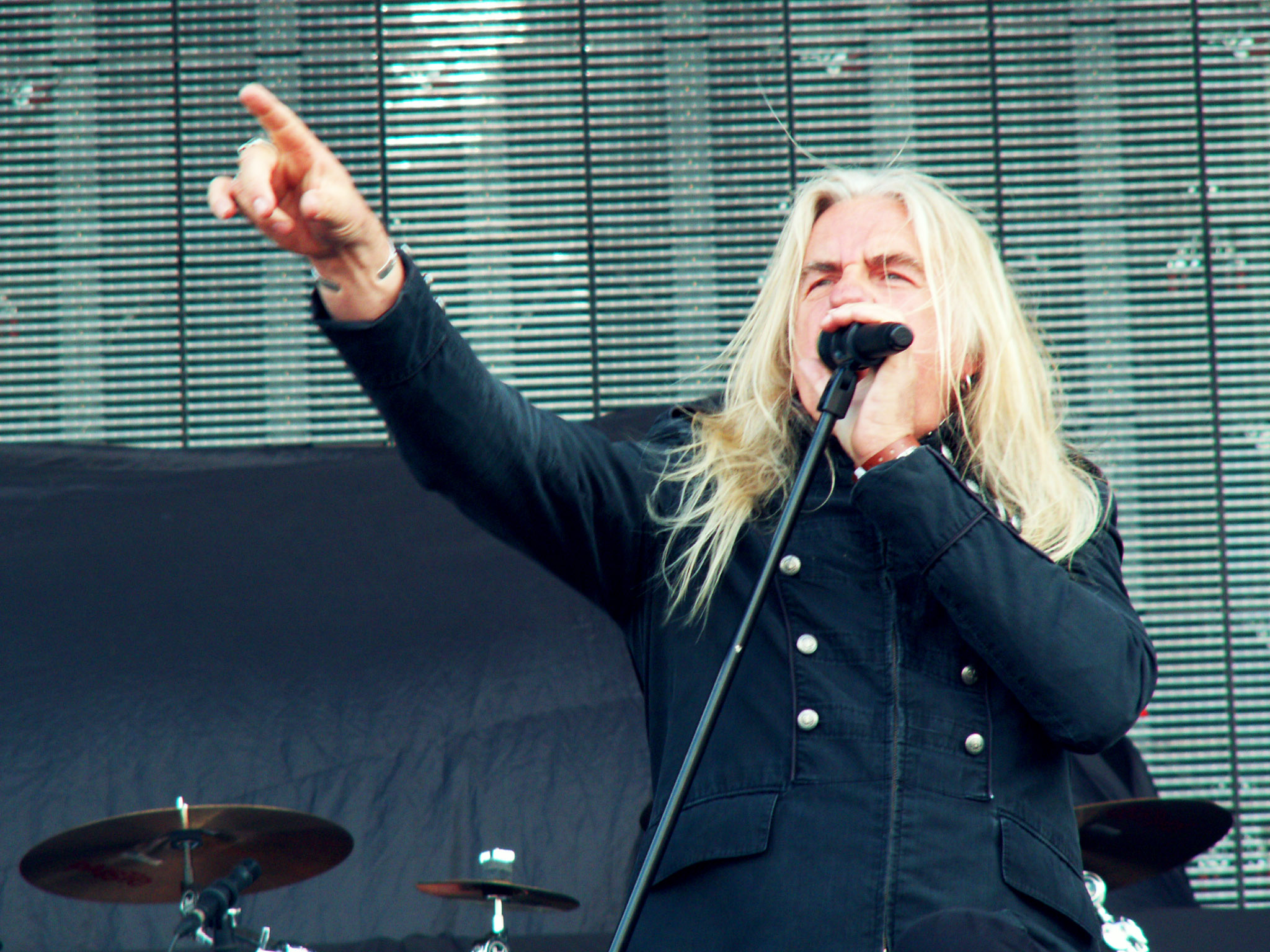
Byford at Hellfest 2010

In April 2007, Byford released his autobiography, entitled Never Surrender after the Saxon song of the same name. Gigwise.com reported on 18 January 2010 that Byford was launching a campaign to have Britons declare heavy metal as their religion in the United Kingdom Census 2011, inspired by the Jedi census phenomenon (where 2001 Census results suggested that Jediism was the UK's fourth most popular religion).

Byford released his first solo album, titled School of Hard Knocks – featuring guest appearances by Phil Campbell, Alex Holzwarth, Nick Barker, Dave Kemp and Nibbs Carter – in February 2020.

On 23 July 2021, Byford released the album Red Brick City under the band name Heavy Water. The album features Byford on bass and vocals, his son Seb on guitar and vocals, Tom Witts on drums, and Dave Kemp on keyboards and saxophone. Music videos were released for the title track "Red Brick City" on 7 May 2021 and "Revolution" on 18 June 2021. The album was recorded at The Big Silver Barn and Reel Recording Studio in York during the 2020 Covid-19 lockdowns.

== Discography ==
With Saxon

Solo

- School of Hard Knocks (2020)

With Air Pavilion

- Kaizoku (1989) – vocals on "She's Hot Stuff"

With Fastway

- Bad Bad Girls (1990)

With Freedom Call

- Taragon (1999) – narration on "Tears of Taragon (Story Version)"

With Destruction

- Inventor of Evil (2005) – vocals on "The Alliance of Hellhoundz"

With Helloween

- Gambling with the Devil (2007) – spoken word on "Crack the Riddle"
- 7 Sinners (2010) – spoken word on 'Who is Mr. Madman?'

With Doro

- Celebrate – The Night of the Warlock (2008) – vocals on "Celebrate" (track 2)

With Avantasia

- The Mystery of Time (2013)

With Motörhead

- Ronnie James Dio – This Is Your Life (2014) – vocals on "Starstruck" (track 6)

With The Scintilla Project

- The Hybrid (2014)

With Amon Amarth

- The Great Heathen Army (2022) - vocals on "Saxons and Vikings" (track 7)

== Bibliography ==
- Never Surrender, 2007
