= List of Star Wars theme parks attractions =

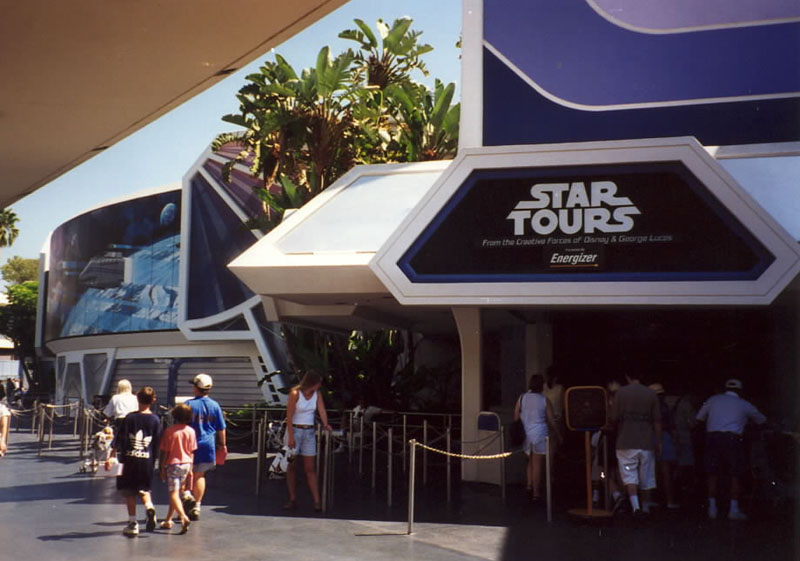
The original Star Tours ride at Disneyland in 1996

The Star Wars franchise has spawned several attractions at multiple Disney themed parks, starting before Disney's acquisition of Lucasfilm. Lucas established a partnership in 1986 with the company's Imagineering division to create an attraction at Disney Parks. The first such attraction, Star Tours, opened at Disneyland in 1987, with several versions opening at other Disney theme parks over the following years. The Star Tours rides at Disneyland and Disney's Hollywood Studios closed in 2010, while Tokyo Disneyland's version closed in 2012 and Disneyland Paris' in 2016. All of the original Star Tours rides were then refurbished into Star Tours–The Adventures Continue. The new attraction randomly shuffles several scenes, allowing up to 54 combinations of different adventures. The successor attraction opened at Disney's Hollywood Studios and Disneyland in 2011, at Tokyo Disneyland in 2013, and at Disneyland Paris in 2017.

From 1997 to 2015, Disney's Hollywood Studios park hosted Star Wars Weekends, an annual festival, during specific dates from May to June. Since 2007, the parks include the live show Jedi Training: Trials of the Temple, where children are selected to learn the teachings of the Jedi Knights and the Force to become Padawan learners; the show is present at Disney's Hollywood Studios and at the Tomorrowland Terrace at Disneyland. Since November 2015, Disneyland hosts a seasonal Star Wars-themed event entitled Season of the Force, which also runs in Disney's Hollywood Studios in Walt Disney World. An exhibition called Star Wars Launch Bay, featuring exhibits and meet-and-greets was also added.

Disney, which bought the Star Wars franchise in 2012, has expressed plans to expand the franchise's presence in all of their theme parks. In 2015, a 14-acre Star Wars-themed land expansion, titled Star Wars: Galaxy's Edge, was announced. The area debuted at Disneyland and Disney's Hollywood Studios in 2019 and includes two new attractions. Star Wars: Galactic Starcruiser, a deluxe resort to be built near Disney's Hollywood Studios, was also announced in 2017. In addition to the attractions at the various Disney Parks, the Museum of Science collaborated with Lucasfilm Ltd. to create an exhibition on the science behind Star Wars.

== Live attractions ==
Title	Park(s)	Opening date	Closing date
Star Tours	Disneyland	January 9, 1987	July 27, 2010
Star Tours	Tokyo Disneyland	July 12, 1989	April 2, 2012
Star Tours	Disney's Hollywood Studios	December 15, 1989	September 7, 2010
Star Tours	Disneyland Paris	April 12, 1992	March 16, 2016
Star Wars Weekends	Disney's Hollywood Studios	1997	November 2015
Star Wars: Where Science Meets Imagination	Multiple locations	October 19, 2005	March 23, 2014
Jedi Training Academy	Disneyland	October 1, 2006	November 15, 2015
Jedi Training Academy	Disney's Hollywood Studios	October 9, 2007	October 5, 2015
Star Tours: The Adventures Continue	Disney's Hollywood Studios	May 20, 2011	N/A (operating)
Star Tours: The Adventures Continue	Disneyland	June 3, 2011	N/A (operating)
Star Tours: The Adventures Continue	Tokyo Disneyland	May 7, 2013	N/A (operating)
Star Tours: The Adventures Continue	Disneyland Paris	March 26, 2017	N/A (operating)
Star Wars: Hyperspace Mountain	Disneyland	November 14, 2015	May 31, 2017
Star Wars: Hyperspace Mountain	Hong Kong Disneyland	June 11, 2016	N/A (operating)
Star Wars: Hyperspace Mountain	Disneyland Paris	May 7, 2017	N/A (operating)
Star Wars Launch Bay	Disneyland	November 16, 2015	N/A (operating)
Star Wars Launch Bay	Disney's Hollywood Studios	December 4, 2015	N/A (operating)
Star Wars Launch Bay	Shanghai Disneyland	June 16, 2016	N/A (operating)
Jedi Training: Trials of the Temple	Disney's Hollywood Studios	December 1, 2015	N/A (operating)
Jedi Training: Trials of the Temple	Disneyland	December 8, 2015	N/A (operating)
Jedi Training: Trials of the Temple	Disneyland Paris	July 11, 2015	N/A (operating)
Jedi Training: Trials of the Temple	Hong Kong Disneyland	June 25, 2016	N/A (operating)
Star Wars: A Galactic Spectacular	Disney's Hollywood Studios	June 17, 2016	N/A (operating)
Star Wars: Galactic Starcruiser	Disney's Hollywood Studios	March 1, 2022	September 30, 2023
Star Wars: Galaxy's Edge	Disneyland	May 31, 2019	N/A (operating)
Star Wars: Galaxy's Edge	Disney's Hollywood Studios	August 29, 2019	N/A (operating)
Star Wars: Millennium Falcon - Smugglers Run	Disneyland	May 31, 2019	N/A (operating)
Star Wars: Millennium Falcon - Smugglers Run	Disney's Hollywood Studios	August 29, 2019	N/A (operating)
Star Wars: Rise of the Resistance	Disney's Hollywood Studios	December 5, 2019	N/A (operating)
Star Wars: Rise of the Resistance	Disneyland	January 17, 2020	N/A (operating)

=== Star Tours (1987–2016) ===
The first such attraction, Star Tours, opened on January 9, 1987, at Disneyland's Tomorrowland replacing the previous attraction, Adventure Thru Inner Space. A motion simulator attraction set in the Star Wars universe, the attraction sent guests on an excursion trip to Endor, whilst being caught in an altercation between the Rebel Alliance and the Galactic Empire. The attraction featured Captain "Rex" RX-24 along with series regulars R2-D2 and C-3PO. At its debut at Disneyland in 1987, it was the first attraction based originally on a non-Disney licensed intellectual property. The attraction later opened at other Disney locations - on July 12, 1989, at Tokyo Disneyland, on December 15, 1989 at Disney's Hollywood Studios, and on April 12, 1992, at Disneyland Paris. The Star Tours ride at Disneyland and Disney's Hollywood Studios closed on July 27, 2010, and September 7, 2010, respectively, allowing conversion for its successor attraction, Star Tours – The Adventures Continue. The latter location was completed on May 20, 2011. The ride later closed at Tokyo Disneyland on April 2, 2012, and at Disneyland Paris on March 16, 2016, marking the original ride's final run of 29 years.

=== Star Wars Weekends (1997–2015) ===
From 1997 to 2015, Walt Disney World Resort's Hollywood Studios held Star Wars Weekends, an annual festival, which typically occurred on Friday, Saturday and Sunday for four consecutive weekends in May and June. The festival featured appearances by cast and crew members from Disney's Star Wars franchise and in addition, many original Disney characters also appeared dressed as Star Wars characters, such as Jedi Mickey, Minnie as Leia, Donald as a stormtrooper, Goofy as Darth Vader and R2-MK (Mickey Mouse stylized astromech droid). The festival began in 1997 and had been held in 2000, 2001, and annually from 2003 until 2015. In November 2015, Disney discontinued the event due to the construction of a Star Wars themed-land and the larger daily presence Star Wars will have in the park onwards.

=== Star Wars: Where Science Meets Imagination (2005–2014) ===
On October 19, 2005, Star Wars: Where Science Meets Imagination opened at the Museum of Science in Boston, Massachusetts. A traveling exhibition created by the Museum of Science, Boston, featuring props and costumes used in the Star Wars films, but focusing primarily on the science behind George Lucas' science fiction epic. Star Wars: Where Science Meets Imagination was developed by Boston's Museum of Science, in collaboration with Lucasfilm Ltd., with the support of the National Science Foundation, under Grant No. 0307875. This exhibit was presented nationally by Bose Corporation.

The exhibit was shown in 18 locations in the United States (Museum of Science, COSI Columbus, Oregon Museum of Science and Industry, California Science Center, Fort Worth Museum of Science and History, Museum of Science and Industry, Franklin Institute, Science Museum of Minnesota, Anchorage Museum, U.S. Space & Rocket Center, Lafayette Science Museum, Pacific Science Center, The Health Museum, Discovery Science Center, Exploration Place, Orlando Science Center, Indiana State Museum and The Tech Museum of Innovation) and 2 locations in Australia (Powerhouse Museum and Scienceworks), drew nearly 3 million visitors across the United States and Australia before making its final appearance in San Jose, California. A companion book was released in 2005. The exhibition was closed on March 23, 2014.

=== Jedi Training Academy (2006–2015) ===
On October 1, 2006, Jedi Training Academy opened at Disneyland. A live show guest experience based on the Jedi teachings found in the Star Wars series where sixteen or more children signed up for each session at the beginning of the day to be Jedi Younglings and participated in a training session by the Jedi Master. They were provided training lightsabers and Jedi robes. As the master completed the instruction of a simple combination of lightsaber attacks to the children, Darth Vader, Darth Maul and two stormtroopers appeared. Each Jedi trainee chose to face off with either Maul or Vader until everyone fought a villain, after which the villains retreated back to the stage, outnumbered (the trainees on the stage fought Vader, while those on the ground fought Maul). The children, now Padawans, were congratulated on their mastering of the Force by Yoda, returned the training lightsabers and robe, and were given a diploma for their participation. The attraction later opened at Disney's Hollywood Studios on October 9, 2007. The attraction closed on October 5, 2015, at Disney's Hollywood and on November 15, 2015, at Disneyland allowing conversion for its successor attraction, Jedi Training: Trials of the Temple.

=== Star Tours – The Adventures Continue (2011–present) ===
On May 20, 2011, Star Tours – The Adventures Continue opened at Disney's Hollywood Studios and was a successor attraction to Star Tours. A 3D motion simulator attraction featuring locations and characters from Episode I – The Phantom Menace through Episode IX – The Rise of Skywalker, unlike its predecessor, which mostly took place during the events of the original trilogy (Episodes IV–VI). The attraction later opened at other Disney locations - on June 3, 2011, at Disneyland, on May 7, 2013, at Tokyo Disneyland, and on March 26, 2017, at Disneyland Paris.

=== Star Wars Launch Bay (2015–present) ===
On November 16, 2015, Star Wars Launch Bay opened at Disneyland. An interactive walkthrough attraction featuring exhibits and meet-and-greets. The attraction later opened at other Disney locations - on December 4, 2015, at Disney's Hollywood Studios and on June 16, 2016, in Shanghai Disneyland Park.

=== Jedi Training: Trials of the Temple (2015–present) ===
On December 1, 2015, Jedi Training: Trials of the Temple opened at Disney's Hollywood Studios, and was a successor attraction to Jedi Training Academy, a live show guest experience based on the Jedi teachings found in the Star Wars series with new characters from Star Wars: Rebels. The attraction later opened at other Disney locations - on December 8, 2015, at Disneyland, on July 11, 2015, at Disneyland Park Paris and on June 25, 2016, at Hong Kong Disneyland, as part of its 10th anniversary celebration. It's located next to Star Tours–The Adventures Continue in the Echo Lake area at Disney's Hollywood Studios, at the Tomorrowland Terrace in Disneyland, inside Videopolis in Discoveryland at Disneyland Park Paris and at the original UFO Zone area in Hong Kong Disneyland.

A group of children goes through the training with the Jedi master (Vanzell Mar-Klar) and a Jedi Apprentice (Nedriss Narr). Then, the group uses the force to open the doors to the Temple. Darth Vader comes out, followed by The Seventh Sister. Each trainee on the upper platform fights Vader, while each trainee on the lower platform fights The Seventh Sister from Star Wars: Rebels. After each trainee has faced off with a villain, Vader and The Seventh Sister turn to leave. Right before they would go through the doors, they turn around to seemingly fight again. The Jedi Master then leads the trainees in using the Force to push The Seventh Sister and Vader back into the Temple.

Darth Maul then comes out of the Temple and begins a fight with the Jedi Apprentice. Yoda then speaks to the Apprentice, who had previously been trying to stay out of the fight. The Apprentice then battles and defeats Maul. Right before killing Maul, the trainees tell the Apprentice to stop. The Apprentice lets Maul live, and Maul goes back into the Temple. Maul comes back out and the trainees once again use the Force and push Maul back into the Temple. Trainees then return the training lightsabers and robe and are given a diploma for their participation.

On February 21, 2016, Kylo Ren replaced Darth Maul at Disney's Hollywood Studios and on March 5, 2016, at Disneyland.

=== Star Wars: A Galactic Spectacular (2016–present) ===
On June 17, 2016, Star Wars: A Galactic Spectacular debuted at Disney's Hollywood Studios, replacing the park's similarly-themed display, Symphony in the Stars: A Galactic Spectacular. A nighttime show based on the Star Wars film series and features fireworks, projection mapping, fire, lasers, fog effects, and searchlights. During the show, Star Wars imagery is projected onto The Great Movie Ride's exterior Chinese Theater facade and surrounding buildings around the park's hub on Hollywood Boulevard.

=== Star Wars: Galaxy's Edge (2019–present) ===
Disney, which now owns the Star Wars franchise, expressed plans to expand the franchise's presence in all of their theme parks since August 2014. At that time, there were rumors to include a major Star Wars-themed expansion to Disney's Hollywood Studios. When asked whether or not Disney has an intellectual property franchise that's comparable to Harry Potter at Universal theme parks, Disney chairman and CEO Bob Iger mentioned Cars, Disney Princesses, and promised that Star Wars, "is going to be just that." Iger formally announced a 14-acre Star Wars-themed land expansion at the 2015 D23 Expo. In the 2017 D23, it was revealed that the area would be named Star Wars: Galaxy's Edge. In November 2017, it was announced that the planet in the land is called Batuu. The area debuted at Disneyland and Disney's Hollywood Studios in 2019 and includes two new attractions inspired by the Millennium Falcon and "a climactic battle between the First Order and the resistance".

=== Star Wars: Galactic Starcruiser (2022–2023) ===
A Star Wars-themed hotel, a deluxe resort to be built near Disney's Hollywood Studios, was also announced at the 2017 D23 Expo.
