= Thunder (disambiguation) =

Thunder is the sound of the shock wave caused by lightning.

Thunder may also refer to:

== Computing ==
- Thunder (assistive technology), a screen reader
- Thunder Networking Technologies, a Chinese multimedia and Internet company
- Thunder, the codename for Microsoft Visual Basic 1.0

== Film and television ==
- Thunder the Dog, star of a series of feature films during the 1920s
- Thunder (TV series), an American children's television series
- Thunder (1929 film), an American silent drama film
- Thunder (1982 film), a Japanese experimental short film
- Thunder Warrior (also known as Thunder), a 1983 Italian action film
- Thunder (2022 film), a Swiss drama film
- The Thunder (TV series), a 2019 Chinese web television series

== Fictional characters ==
- Thunder (DC Comics), the name of three superheroes in the DC Comics universe
- Thunder, a Legion of Super-Heroes member
- Thunder (G.I. Joe), a character from the G.I. Joe universe
- Thunder (Killer Instinct), a character from the video game Killer Instinct
- T.H.U.N.D.E.R. Agents, a team of superheroes, originating with Tower Comics

== Music ==
- Thunder (band), an English rock band

=== Albums ===
- Thunder (Andy Taylor album) (1987)
- Thunder (SMV album) (2008)

=== Songs ===
- "Thunder" (Boys Like Girls song) (2008)
- "Thunder" (East 17 song) (1995)
- "Thunder" (Imagine Dragons song) (2017)
- "Thunder" (Jessie J song) (2013)
- "Thunder" (Leona Lewis song) (2015)
- "Thunder" (Gabry Ponte, Lum!x and Prezioso song), (2021)
- "Thunder" (Prince song) (1991)
- "Thunder" (Seventeen song) (2025)
- "Thunder", a song by Chloe x Halle from Sugar Symphony (2016)
- "Thunder", a song by Exo from Overdose (2014)
- "Thunder", a song by Lana Del Rey from Blue Banisters (2021)
- "Thunder", a song by Lisa from Alter Ego (2025)
- "Thunder", a song by the Prodigy from Invaders Must Die (2009)
- "Thunder", a song by The Runaways from The Runaways (1976)

== People ==
- Thunder (luchador) (1981–2016), Australian professional wrestler
- Thunder (singer) (born 1990), of South Korean boy band MBLAQ
- Jushin Thunder Liger (born 1964), Japanese professional wrestler
- Thunder, a member of the TV show American Gladiators

== Sports ==
=== Teams ===
- Lancashire Thunder, an English women's cricket team
- Manchester Thunder, an English netball team
- Minnesota Thunder, a soccer team in the USL First Division
- New Orleans Thunder, a professional American football team in 1999
- Newcastle Thunder, an English rugby league club
- North West Thunder, an English women's cricket team
- Oklahoma City Thunder, a basketball team in the National Basketball Association
- Quad City Thunder, a basketball team in the Continental Basketball Association
- Seattle Thunder, an American women's gridiron football team
- Seoul Samsung Thunders, a South Korean pro basketball team
- Sydney Thunder, a cricket team in the Big Bash League
- Trenton Thunder, a minor league baseball team in New Jersey
- Toshiba Kawasaki Brave Thunders, a Japanese basketball team
- Wichita Thunder, an ice hockey team in the Central Hockey League

=== Other ===
- Thunder (mascot), the mascot for the Denver Broncos
- Thunder, a former mascot of the Golden State Warriors NBA basketball team
- Thunder on the Ohio, a hydroplane boat race held at Evansville, Indiana, on the Ohio River

== Transportation and vehicular ==
- JF-17 Thunder, an advanced multirole fighter aircraft developed by China and Pakistan

=== Ships, boats, barges ===
- FV Thunder, an outlaw trawler, a fishing vessel
- HMCS Thunder, a Royal Canadian Navy shipname
- HMS Thunder (1855), an Aetna-class ironclad floating battery
- HMS Thunder, a list of other so named Royal Navy ships
- USS Thunder (1862), a blockade running steamer of the US Navy

== Other uses ==
- Ar-Ra'd, "The Thunder", 13th sura of the Qur'an
- Dr. Thunder, a brand of soda
- Fort Thunder, a former venue for underground music events in Providence, Rhode Island
- Thunder (born 2017) of Thunder and Bolt, twin miniature pigs licensed as American therapy animals
- Thunder (British comics), published by IPC 1970-71
- Thunder (play), Russian drama written in 1859
- Thunder Over Louisville, a fireworks show
- The Thunder, Perfect Mind, a Gnostic work
- Triple Action Thunder, a pistol
- WCW Thunder, a professional wrestling show

== See also ==
- Thunders (disambiguation)
- Castle Thunder (disambiguation)
- God of Thunder (disambiguation)
- Ikazuchi (disambiguation)
- Lightning (disambiguation)
- Lightning bolt (disambiguation)
- Rolling Thunder (disambiguation)
- Thunder Bay (disambiguation)
- Thunder god
- Thunderer (disambiguation)
- Thunderclap (disambiguation)
- Thunderbolt (disambiguation)
- Thunderstorm
- Thundarr the Barbarian
