= Thunder boat =

Thunderboat or thunder boat may refer to:

- hydroplane (boat), also called thunderboat: a raceboat, a type of racing hydrofoil motorboat
- French ship Tonnerre (L9014), (French: Tonnere, lit. 'Thunder'), a French Navy helicopter carrier amphibious assault tender-carrier-ship, nicknamed "Thunder Boat" in English
- thunder boat, a monster machine from Blaze and the Monster Machines; see List of Blaze and the Monster Machines episodes

== See also ==
- Thunder (ship), ships and boats named "Thunder"
- Thunderbolt (disambiguation)
- Thunder (disambiguation)
- Boat (disambiguation)
- Lightning (dinghy), a class of sailboat
- Lightning (disambiguation)
- Lightning bolt (disambiguation)
