= Bolt =

Bolt or bolts may refer to:

== Implements and technology ==
Etymology: "to strike"; see for example Thunderbolt

- Bolt (fastener), a threaded shaft, used to clamp two components together
- Bolt (climbing), an anchor point used in rock climbing
- Bolt (firearms), a mechanism used in firearms
- Crossbow bolt, ammunition used in a crossbow
- Spy bolt, a clandestine storage device

== Arts, entertainment, and media ==
- Bolt (1994 film), a drama starring Richard Grieco
- Bolt (2008 film), a Disney animated film
  - Bolt (Disney character), the main character of the film
  - Bolt (video game), based on the film
- Bolt (DC Comics), the name of several unrelated characters appearing in American comic books published by DC Comics
- Bolt (1986), a book by Dick Francis
- B.O.L.T, a Japanese girl group
- The Bolt (Fragonard), a painting by Jean-Honoré Fragonard
- The Bolt (Shostakovich), a three-act ballet by Dmitri Shostakovich
- The Bolts, an American independent rock band
- Bolts (magazine)

== Businesses and organizations ==
- Bolt (company), an Estonian multinational mobility company
- Bolt Mobility, an American electric scooter company co-founded by Usain Bolt
- Bolt Financial, an American fintech company founded by Ryan Breslow

== Computing ==
- Bolt (content management system), open source software
- Bolt (network protocol), a network protocol used in database applications
- Bolt (web browser), a web browser for mobile phones
- Bolt (website), a social networking and video website active from 1996 to 2007

== Places ==
- Bolt, West Virginia, United States, an unincorporated census-designated place
- Bolt, Wisconsin, United States, an unincorporated community
- Bolt Head, a National Trust headland in Devon, England, United Kingdom
- La Bolt, South Dakota, United States, a town
- Mount Bolt, Victoria Land, Antarctica

== Sports ==
- Bolt Arena, a football stadium in Helsinki, Finland
- Anaheim Bolts, a Professional Arena Soccer League team
- Boston Bolts (1988–1990), a short-lived American Soccer League team
- Boston Bolts (USL), a semi-professional soccer team
- Los Angeles Chargers (secondary nickname), a National Football League team
- Meralco Bolts, a Philippine Basketball Association team
- Tampa Bay Lightning (secondary nickname), a National Hockey League team

== Vehicles ==
- Chevrolet Bolt EV, a 2016–present American subcompact electric hatchback
- Chevrolet Bolt EUV, a 2021–present American subcompact electric SUV
- Tata Bolt, a 2014–2019 Indian subcompact hatchback
- Yamaha Bolt, a 2013–present American-Japanese cruiser motorcycle

== Other uses ==
- Bolt (cloth), a unit of measurement
- Bolt (surname)
- Bolt (born 2017) of Thunder and Bolt, twin miniature pigs licensed as American therapy animals

== See also ==
- Bolting (disambiguation)
- Lightning bolt (disambiguation)
- Thunderbolt (disambiguation)
- Screw, a type of fastener, in some ways similar to a bolt
