= Rolling Thunder =

Rolling Thunder may refer to:

== Arts ==
=== Film ===
- Rolling Thunder (film), a 1977 film starring William Devane
- Rolling Thunder (1996 film), a film produced by Gary Adelson
- Rolling Thunder Pictures, a film distribution company
- Rolling Thunder Revue: A Bob Dylan Story by Martin Scorsese, a 2019 pseudo-documentary film

=== Music ===
- Rolling Thunder Revue, Bob Dylan's 1975–1976 musical tour
- The Bootleg Series Vol. 5: Bob Dylan Live 1975, The Rolling Thunder Revue, a live album recorded during the tour
- Rolling Thunder (album), an album by Mickey Hart
- "Rolling Thunder" (march), a march written by Henry Fillmore
- "Rolling Thunder", a song by A-ha from East of the Sun, West of the Moon
- "Rolling Thunder", a song by Conrad Sewell from Precious

=== Other ===
- Rolling Thunder (journal), an anarchist periodical
- Rolling Thunder (novel), a novel by John Varley
- Rolling Thunder, a comics publishing company operated by Dave Dorman

== Sports, games and amusements ==
- Rolling Thunder (exercise), a strength athletics event and grip exercise
- Rolling Thunder (video game), a side-scrolling action video game by Namco originally released in 1986
- Rolling Thunder (roller coaster), at Six Flags Great Adventure
- Alpine Bobsled, a roller coaster formerly known as Rolling Thunder at Six Flags Great America
- Rolling Thunder skate park, in London
- Rolling Thunder, a professional wrestling attack
- Rolling Thunder Cyclocross Race, a cycling event

== Other uses ==
- Operation Rolling Thunder, a U.S. bombing campaign during the Vietnam War
- Rolling Thunder (organization), a U.S. MIA/POW organization
- Rolling Thunder (person), John Pope (1916–1997), a hippie spiritual leader
- Rolling Thunder Mountain, Wyoming, U.S.

== See also ==
- Thunder (disambiguation)
