= Steve Douglas (skateboarder) =

- Born: 1967 (age 58–59); North London, United Kingdom
- Occupation: Vice president of Dwindle Distribution
- Website: Dwindle Distribution

Steve Douglas is a retired professional skateboarder and longtime employee of the skateboard industry from London. Since April 2014, he has been the Vice President of Dwindle Distribution.

== Biography ==
=== Early life ===
Douglas was born in 1967 in North London. He began skateboarding at the age of 10 at various skateparks in the city, such as Uxbridge, Skate City, Rolling Thunder skate park, Crystal Palace Vert Ramp, and Harrow Skate Park. Douglas frequented Harrow from the day it opened, along with Rodga Harvey, John Sablosky and Jeremy Henderson. Later, the "H-Boyz crew" Douglas helped found would become regulars at Harrow Skate Park.

=== Skateboarding ===
In 1981, at the insistence of skate-photographer Tim Leighton-Boyce, Douglas began entering English Skateboard Association (ESA) contests. He won all the "under-16" events that he had entered. Douglas' success caught the attention of American sponsors such as Madrid Skateboards, Vans Shoes, Independent Trucks and Quiksilver Surf Wear.

Throughout the early 1980s, Douglas wrote and published a skateboarding magazine with Benjamin Thomas called Go For It!, named after a Stiff Little Fingers record. In the absence of any other topical periodical Douglas and Thomas' magazine became influential within the British skateboarding scene. A total of 16 issues were produced, the last three of which were in a glossy, printed form. The penultimate issue, entitled the Swindle Issue, only had one glossy cover.

In 1984, the European Skateboard Association managed to convince their US counterparts, the National Skateboard Association, to label their contest series as a 'world championship' so the ESA could obtain government grants to send a UK team to participate. The first-ever UK team included Douglas, Harvey, Lucian Hendrix, and Sean Goff.

In 1986, following the release of a Go For It! calendar, Douglas prioritized overseas work commitments and Go For It! closed. By this time, Tim Leighton-Boyce's R.A.D. publication was available, followed by Shane Rouse's Skate Action and Steve Kane's Skateboard.

Douglas was assigned a professional status in 1987 by his skateboard deck sponsor, Schmitt Stix. The company released a Douglas signature model deck in 1988, which featured a picture of a spoof beer bottle label with the caption: 'Imported from Crystal Palace, London, England'.

After releasing a final signature model, Paul Schmitt decided to dissolve Schmitt Stix, at Douglas' behest. Schmitt then relaunched under a new name, 'New Deal Skateboards,' with a new team, new product line and renewed focus. Schmitt, a notable international skateboard manufacturer at that time, created the new brand with Douglas and Andy Howell. Douglas used the 'New Deal' name to co-found a skate shop in London, originally located in a retail unit in the Harrow and Wealdstone shopping mall and later moved to Harrow Solid Surf Skatepark.

Along with Tony Magnusson's H-Street and Steve Rocco's World Industries, New Deal developed into a successful skateboard brand in the early 1990s by embracing the emerging street-based skateboarding revolution that favored new skateboarders such as Ed Templeton, who appeared in New Deal's first promotional video, Useless Wooden Toys (1990).

Bolstered by New Deal's success, Douglas co-founded the Giant Distribution skateboard company in the early 1990s and eventually became the company's president. Hugh "Bod" Boyle, Douglas' UK friend and former professional skateboarder, eventually joined the company after a knee injury prematurely ended his skating career in the early 1990s. Boyle won the skateboarding World Championship in 1990.

In 1992, Howell decided to form his own skateboard brand. With Douglas' help they founded 'Underworld Element', later renamed to Element Skateboards, which remains a prominent skateboard company today. John Lucero, Douglas' teammate first at Madrid then at Schmitt Stix, started his own skateboard brand in 1988 called 'Lucero Skateboards,' soon renamed Black Label Skateboards. By the mid-1990s, Black Label was run out of a garage and Douglas restructured the company to further facilitate its growth.

Douglas also co-founded 411 video magazine 411VM and later the On Video series, both crucial to skateboarding's development through the 1990s and the new millennium. He also founded a new truck company in the late 1990s, Destructo Trucks, with the usual success, and took over production of Bam Margera's notorious CKY before Margera moved the series to television. In 2004 Douglas accepted an offer from Burton Snowboards to be general manager at their clothing subsidiary Analog. A year later Douglas was reunited with his old friend 'Bod' Boyle when they both came to work at Giant's rival Dwindle Distribution; Boyle as president and Douglas in an advisory position.

In addition to his work at skateboarding companies, Douglas is also a committee member of both the IASC and USA Skateboarding, the national governing Body of American skateboarding.
