= Jedi Academy (disambiguation) =

A Jedi Academy is a fictional academy in the Star Wars franchise

Jedi Academy may also refer to:

- Jedi Academy trilogy, a 1994 novel series
- Star Wars Jedi Knight: Jedi Academy, a 2003 video game
- Jedi Training: Trials of the Temple, also known as Jedi Training Academy, an amusement park attraction
- Jedi Academy, a 2013 novel series, see the list of Star Wars books
- Jedi Academy Training Manual, a 2009 role-playing gamebook, see the list of Star Wars reference books
