= Thunders =

Thunders may refer to:

- Bonnie Thunders (born 1983), American roller derby skater
- Johnny Thunders (1952–1991), American guitarist, singer, and songwriter
- JT Thunders, a Japanese men's volleyball club

== See also ==
- Thunder (disambiguation)
- Seven Thunders (disambiguation)
