= Russian ship Gromoboi =

Several ships of the Imperial Russian Navy have been named Gromoboi (Russian: Громобой, meaning thunderer)

- Russian frigate Gromoboi – a 3,200-ton Ilya Muromets-class screw frigate built by Ulricaborgs skeppsvarf, Helsinki. 53 guns, 400 horsepower steam engine, length 63 meters.
- Russian cruiser Gromoboi – a 12,455-ton armoured cruiser built by the Baltic Works, St Petersburg.
