= Thunderbolt (disambiguation) =

A thunderbolt is a symbolic representation of lightning accompanied by a loud thunderclap.

Thunderbolt(s) may also refer to:

== People and characters ==
=== People ===
- Bayezid I (fl. 1389-1402), nicknamed Yıldırım ("Thunderbolt"), Ottoman sultan
- Captain Thunderbolt (1833–1870), Australian bushranger
- Georgios Kondylis (1878–1936), nicknamed Keravnos ("Thunderbolt"), Greek general and prime minister
- Krzysztof Mikołaj "the Thunderbolt" Radziwiłł (1547–1603), prince of the Holy Roman Empire and nobleman of the Polish-Lithuanian Commonwealth
- Ptolemy Keraunos (fl. 281-279 BC), King of Macedonia
- Thunderbolt Gibbons (fl. 1820), Irish leader of the secret Whiteboys agrarian organization
- Thunderbolt Patterson (born 1941), American professional wrestler
- Thunderbolt, professional wrestler from the Gorgeous Ladies of Wrestling

=== Fictional characters ===
- The Thunderbolt, a pulp fiction character created by Johnston McCulley (1883-1958)
- Colonel Volgin, also known as "Thunderbolt", in Metal Gear Solid 3: Snake Eater
- Thunderbolt (DC Comics), a comics character related to the character Johnny Thunder
- Thunderbolt (Marvel Comics), either of two comics characters
- Thunderbolt, a peregrine falcon in the 2024 animated film The Wild Robot
- Peter Cannon, Thunderbolt, a Charlton Comics character
- Thunderbolt Ross, a Marvel comics character
- Thunderbolt Jaxon, a comics character from Amalgamated Press
- Thunderbolts (comics), a Marvel Comics comic book team
- Thunderbolt, Heroic Warrior from Supernaturals (toy line)

== Places ==
- Thunderbolt, Georgia
- Thunderbolt Peak, California
- Thunderbolt Wreck, a dive site off the coast of Florida
- Thunderbolt Trail, a historic backcountry ski trail in Massachusetts

== Arts, entertainment, media ==
=== Literature ===
- Peter Cannon, Thunderbolt, a Charlton Comics and DC Comics comic book title
- The Thunderbolt (newspaper), a publication of the U.S. National States' Rights Party
- Thunderbolts (comic book), Marvel Comics comic book titles based on the comic book team of the same name

=== Films ===
- Thunderbolt (1910 film), an Australian outlaw film
- The Thunderbolt (1912 film), an American short drama
- The Thunderbolt (1919 film), an American drama
- Thunderbolt (1929 film), an American noir film directed by Josef von Sternberg
- Thunderbolt (1947 film), an American World War II documentary
- Captain Thunderbolt (film), 1953 Australian "outlaw" film
- Thunderbolt (1995 film), a Hong Kong film starring Jackie Chan
- Quentin Tarantino's Thunderbolt, the fictitious "original title" of the 2007 American film Death Proof
- Thunderbolts*, a 2025 American superhero film based on the comic book team of the same name

=== Music ===
==== Albums ====
- Thunderbolt (album), by Saxon
- Thunderbolt – A Tribute to AC/DC; see list of AC/DC tribute albums

==== Songs ====
- "Thunderbolt", a song by Björk from Biophilia
- "Thunderbolt", a song by BWO from Big Science
- "Thunderbolt", a song by Dozer from Madre de Dios
- "Thunderbolt", a song by Saxon from the eponymous album Thunderbolt (album)
- "Thunderbolt", a song by Valensia from Valensia II (also known as K.O.S.M.O.S)

==== Performers ====
- Thunderbolt (band), a Norwegian heavy metal band

== Military ==
=== Organizations ===
- Legio XII Fulminata, a Roman legion named for the Latin word for Thunderbolt
- 11th Armored Division (United States), nicknamed "Thunderbolt"
- Sa'ka Forces (thunderbolt), an Egyptian military commando force
- As-Sa'iqa (thunderbolt), a Palestinian Ba'athist political and military faction
- Al-Saiqa (Libya) (thunderbolt), a special forces unit
- The Thunderbolts, the former aerobatic demonstration team of the Indian Air Force

=== Ships ===
- HMS Thunderbolt, any of several Royal Navy vessels
- USS Thunderbolt, a U.S. Navy patrol ship
- The Thunderbolt, English nickname of the FS Tonnere (L9014) (French: Tonnere, lit. 'Thunder'), a French Navy helicopter carrier amphibious assault tender-carrier-ship

=== Aircraft ===
- Fairchild Republic A-10 Thunderbolt II, an American ground support aircraft
- HESA Saeqeh ("Thunderbolt"), an Iranian fighter aircraft based on the American Northrop F-5
- Mitsubishi J2M Raiden ("Thunderbolt"), a Japanese land-based fighter
- Macchi C.202 Folgore (Italian "thunderbolt"), a WWII Italian fighter aircraft developed and manufactured by Macchi Aeronautica
- Republic P-47 Thunderbolt, a US Army Air Force fighter aircraft
- Saab 37 Viggen, also known as Thunderbolt, a Swedish fighter and attack aircraft

=== Other uses in military ===
- Thunderbolt-2000, a Republic of China (Taiwan) Army rocket launcher system
- Thunderbolt, a test bed variant of the M8 Armored Gun System
- SC-76 Thunderbolt, a British bolt-action rifle

== Roller coasters ==
- Thunderbolt (Celebration City), in Branson, Missouri
- Thunderbolt (1925 roller coaster), defunct, at Coney Island, New York
- Thunderbolt (2014 roller coaster), at Coney Island, New York
- Thunderbolt (Dreamworld), defunct, in Queensland, Australia
- Thunderbolt (Kennywood), in West Mifflin, Pennsylvania
- Thunderbolt (Savin Rock), defunct, in West Haven, Connecticut
- Thunderbolt (Six Flags New England), in Agawam, Massachusetts

== Sports teams ==
- Windy City ThunderBolts, a Frontier League baseball team in Crestwood, Illinois
- Silver Spring–Takoma Thunderbolts, a Maryland collegiate summer baseball team
- The Thunderbolts, nickname of the Australia national rugby sevens team second team

== Technology ==
- Thunderbolt (interface), a computer peripheral connector
  - Apple Thunderbolt Display, a computer monitor
- HTC ThunderBolt, a cell phone

== Transportation ==
- Thunderbolt (car), British land speed record holder of the 1930s
- Thunderbolt, a GWR 3031 Class locomotive
- Ford Fairlane Thunderbolt, an experimental automobile built in 1964
- BSA Thunderbolt, a British motorcycle manufactured between 1964 and 1972

== Other uses ==
- Thunderbolt (siren), an outdoor emergency warning siren
- Love at first sight, often characterized as a "thunderbolt"
- Lampropeltis getula, a snake species also known as thunderbolt

== See also ==
- Operation Thunderbolt (disambiguation)
- Bolt (disambiguation)
- Lightning bolt (disambiguation)
- Thunder (disambiguation)
- Thunderclap (disambiguation)
- Thunderbolt and Lightfoot, a 1974 American crime film
- Thunder and Bolt (born 2017), twin miniature pigs licensed as American therapy animals
- Thunderball (disambiguation)
