= Rolling Thunder skate park =

== Rolling Thunder UK ==
Built inside the Old Market in Brentford, Chiswick (London, England), Rolling Thunder was one of the first wave of British skateparks to be made in the late 1970s. Designed by Richard Wrigley (co-designer of London's first skatepark – Skate City), it was built by Mayway Construction Ltd. Building started early in 1978 but the park did not open officially till September 1978 due to various setbacks such as a water mains bursting. Sections of the park however had been open and skated prior to the official opening.

== Layout ==
The park covered some 3,000 square meters and was unusual for the time in that it was a series of interlinking bowls, banks and half pipes that could be ridden individually or as part of a whole. This is much more in keeping with the modern parks of today. The park consisted of: The Channel Run, Clover Leaf Pool, Freestyle Area, Reservoir, The Ramp and Death Valley Run, The Whiplash, Kidney Bowl, Pool Bowl, Mini Bowls, Half-pipe. The Half Pipe was 55 meters long and stretched across one side of the building.

== Rolling Thunder USA ==
In the western United States - Dwight Cushman & Jane Cushman, designed built owned and operated the Northern California Yreka, Rolling Thunder Skatepark between 2001 - 2003 at 429 N. Foothill Drive. Named after the sound made by the "Blue Goose" railroad locomotive which traveled the tracks just behind the skatepark's warehouse. The two story indoor outdoor skatepark catered to Skateboards & BMX. The first Northern California indoor skatepark and outdoor vert ramp was open late 7 days a week. Rolling Thunder also hosted the "Best in the West" Skate/BMX contest series in Northern California and Southern Oregon. One of its contests in the series was the very first organized "Game of skate" ever hosted and took place at the Medford skateboard park in 2003. This contest (sponsored by the Emerica Footwear Company) went on to inspire the world-famous "Eric Koston Game of Sk8" contest series. Rolling Thunder also sponsored and nurtured riders in the CASL (California Amateur Skateboard League) including such infamous NorCal skaters as Mike Pennings and Jeff Ward. Various concerts were held at Rolling Thunder including performances by High Wire Days, Bent, and many others. After closing its doors, Rolling Thunder's ramps, and rails were purchased and incorporated into the "Ramp Rats" indoor Skatepark in Petaluma, CA.

== See also ==
- Black Lion Skatepark
- The Rom
- Harrow Skate Park
- Bro Bowl
