= Let Me Feel Your Power =

Live album by Saxon
- Released: 7 October 2016
- Recorded: Various dates in 2015 and 2016
- Genre: Heavy metal
- Length: 144:39
- Label: UDR GmbH

Saxon chronology
Battering Ram (2015)	Let Me Feel Your Power (2016)	Thunderbolt (2018)

Professional ratings
Review scores
Source	Rating
Classic Rock	3/5 stars

Let Me Feel Your Power is the tenth live album by the British heavy metal band Saxon. The title comes from the third track on their seventeenth studio album, The Inner Sanctum. Originally, it was to be released on 23 September 2016, but it was pushed back to 7 October. In the US, the release date was 28 October.

== Recording ==
The album was recorded during their tour in support of their twenty-first studio album, Battering Ram, and was compiled from live shows performed at three different locations:

- Zenith - Munich, Germany (21 November 2015)
- The Old Market - Hove, England (23 January 2016)
- Arcada Theatre - St. Charles, Illinois (20 September 2015) - labelled by UDR as 'bonus material'.

Motörhead performed at the Zenith on the same days as Saxon. Their sets were also recorded and were released as a live album and video called Clean Your Clock in June 2016.

Included are thirteen songs from Munich, three from Hove and eighteen from St. Charles.

== Release ==
=== Formats ===
- DVD and two CDs (digipak)
- Blu-Ray disc and two CDs (digipak)
- Digital download
- Two LPs, two CDs and a Blu-Ray disc - limited to 1500 copies

== Track listing ==
Disc one (CD/LP/Digital) / Main feature (DVD/Blu-Ray)
No.	Title	Recording location/date	Length
1.	"Battering Ram"	Zenith, Munich - 21 November 2015	04:41
2.	"Motorcycle Man"	Zenith, Munich - 21 November 2015	03:33
3.	"Sacrifice"	Zenith, Munich - 21 November 2015	04:09
4.	"Destroyer"	Zenith, Munich - 21 November 2015	03:22
5.	"Power and the Glory"	Zenith, Munich - 21 November 2015	05:02
6.	"20,000 Ft"	Zenith, Munich - 21 November 2015	03:25
7.	"The Devil's Footprint"	Zenith, Munich - 21 November 2015	04:01
8.	"Heavy Metal Thunder"	Zenith, Munich - 21 November 2015	02:54
9.	"Queen of Hearts"	Zenith, Munich - 21 November 2015	05:27
10.	"Princess of the Night"	Zenith, Munich - 21 November 2015	03:59
11.	"Wheels of Steel:^{A}"	Zenith, Munich - 21 November 2015	06:46
12.	"Denim and Leather"	Zenith, Munich - 21 November 2015	04:53
13.	"Crusader"	Zenith, Munich - 21 November 2015	05:16
14.	"Eye of the Storm"	The Old Market, Hove - 23 January 2016	03:40
15.	"Battalions of Steel"	The Old Market, Hove - 23 January 2016	04:40
16.	"Requiem"	The Old Market, Hove - 23 January 2016	05:04

Disc two (CD/LP/digital) / Bonus material (DVD/Blu-Ray)
No.	Title	Recording location/date	Length
1.	"Motorcycle Man"	Arcada Theatre, St. Charles - 20 September 2015	3:43
2.	"Battering Ram^{[B]}"	Arcada Theatre, St. Charles - 20 September 2015	N/A
3.	"This Town Rocks"	Arcada Theatre, St. Charles - 20 September 2015	4:11
4.	"Sacrifice"	Arcada Theatre, St. Charles - 20 September 2015	3:55
5.	"Power and the Glory"	Arcada Theatre, St. Charles - 20 September 2015	4:52
6.	"Solid Ball of Rock"	Arcada Theatre, St. Charles - 20 September 2015	5:43
7.	"Dallas 1 PM"	Arcada Theatre, St. Charles - 20 September 2015	5:58
8.	"Heavy Metal Thunder"	Arcada Theatre, St. Charles - 20 September 2015	2:53
9.	"Rock The Nations"	Arcada Theatre, St. Charles - 20 September 2015	3:50
10.	"The Eagle Has Landed"	Arcada Theatre, St. Charles - 20 September 2015	7:19
11.	"Wheels of Steel"	Arcada Theatre, St. Charles - 20 September 2015	5:40
12.	"Backs To The Wall"	Arcada Theatre, St. Charles - 20 September 2015	3:40
13.	"Just Let Me Rock"	Arcada Theatre, St. Charles - 20 September 2015	4:01
14.	"Strong Arm of the Law"	Arcada Theatre, St. Charles - 20 September 2015	4:21
15.	"747 (Strangers in the Night)"	Arcada Theatre, St. Charles - 20 September 2015	4:51
16.	"Princess of the Night"	Arcada Theatre, St. Charles - 20 September 2015	3:57
17.	"Crusader^{[B]}"	Arcada Theatre, St. Charles - 20 September 2015	N/A
18.	"Denim and Leather"	Arcada Theatre, St. Charles - 20 September 2015	4:53

^{A} On 1 September, this track was made available as an iTunes purchase. Those who pre-ordered the album on iTunes could download it for free.
^{B} These songs are only available as video content on the DVD and Blu-Ray versions and aren't included as part of the CD/LP/digital versions.

== Personnel ==
- Biff Byford – vocals
- Paul Quinn – guitars
- Doug Scarratt – guitars
- Nibbs Carter – bass
- Nigel Glockler - drums

== Charts ==
Chart (2016)	Peak position
Belgian Albums (Ultratop Wallonia)	107
French Albums (SNEP)	169
German Albums (Offizielle Top 100)	47
UK Independent Albums (Official Charts)	40
UK Rock & Metal Albums (Official Charts)	19
