= Bolt of lightning =

Bolt of lightning may refer to:

- Lightning, an atmospheric electric discharge
- Bolt of Lightning (sculpture), a 1984 sculpture by Isamu Noguchi
- "A Bolt of Lightning", an episode of the TV series Studio One

== See also ==
- Lightning bolt (disambiguation)
- ...Like a Bolt of Lightning, a 2004 EP by Juliette and the Licks
