= Bolting =

Bolting may refer to:

- Bolting, either of two undesirable horse behaviors: running away out of control or eating too fast
- Bolting (horticulture), a growth behaviour in plants
- Bolting of flour (archaic): sifting, as in the British Bolting Act of 1678
- The use of a bolt (fastener)

== See also ==
- Bolt (disambiguation)
