= 411 Video Magazine =

Skateboarding video series

411 Video Magazine (commonly abbreviated as 411VM or 411) was a skateboarding video series. 411 was created in 1993 by Josh Friedberg and Steve Douglas. 411 released four issues per year, until its last issue, issue 67 was released in 2005. Prior to 411, professional skateboarders only showcased their video footage in major video releases, which were sometimes spread years apart. 411 gave skateboarding fans access to videos of professional skateboarders more frequently than ever before.

411 was originally produced on VHS tapes, and then later transitioned to DVD.

== Host ==
The first 50 issues were hosted by Lance Mountain. Afterward, each issue was hosted by a special guest.

== Common sections ==
Openers - The best tricks of the issue, played mostly in slow motion.

Chaos - Mix of skateboarders on any terrain

Transitions - Skateboarders only skating ramps and pools

Switchstance - Only switchstance tricks

Wheels of Fortune - Amateur video spotlight and interview

Pro Files - Professional video spotlight and interview

Grapevine - Gossip and news section

Commercial Break - Advertisements

Road Trip - Skateboarders on tour

Profile - a profile of a skateboarder

Day in the Life - Day in the life of a pro skateboarder

Industry - Profile of a skateboard company and their team

Shop Industry - Profile of a skateboard shop and local skaters

Metrospective - Profile of a city and their local skaters

== Instagram account ==
In 2014, the makers of 411 created an Instagram account that featured archived content from 411 along with answering frequently asked questions from fans.

== Main Skateboarding Releases ==
Below is the list of the main 67 411VM skateboarding issues

- Issue 1: July 1993
- Issue 2: September 1993
- Issue 3: November 1993
- Issue 4: January 1994
- Issue 5: March 1994
- Issue 6: May 1994
- Issue 7: August 1994
- Issue 8: October 1994
- Issue 9: December 1994
- Issue 10: March 1995
- Issue 11: May 1995
- Issue 12: July 1995
- Issue 13: September 1995
- Issue 14: January 1996
- Issue 15: March 1996
- Issue 16: May 1996
- Issue 17: July 1996
- Issue 18: September 1996
- Issue 19: November 1996
- Issue 20: January 1997
- Issue 21: March 1997
- Issue 22: May 1997
- Issue 23: July 1997
- Issue 24: September 1997
- Issue 25: November 1997
- Issue 26: January 1998
- Issue 27: March 1998
- Issue 28: May 1998
- Issue 29: July 1998
- Issue 30: September 1998
- Issue 31: November 1998
- Issue 32: January 1999
- Issue 33: March 1999
- Issue 34: May 1999
- Issue 35: July 1999
- Issue 36: September 1999
- Issue 37: November 1999
- Issue 38: January 2000
- Issue 39: March 2000
- Issue 40: May 2000
- Issue 41: July 20000
- Issue 42: September 2000
- Issue 43: November 2000
- Issue 44: January 2001
- Issue 45: March 2001
- Issue 46: May 2001
- Issue 47: July 2001
- Issue 48: September 2001
- Issue 49: November 2001
- Issue 50: January 2002
- Issue 51: March 2002
- Issue 52: May 2002
- Issue 53: July 2002
- Issue 54: September 2002
- Issue 55: November 2002
- Issue 56: January 2003
- Issue 57: March 2003
- Issue 58: May 2003
- Issue 59: July 2003
- Issue 60: September 2003
- Issue 61: November 2003
- Issue 62: January 2004
- Issue 63: March 2004
- Issue 64: May 2004
- Issue 65: July 2004
- Issue 66: September 2004
- Issue 67: November 2004
