= Tomorrowland Terrace =

Quick-service restaurant at Disney Parks

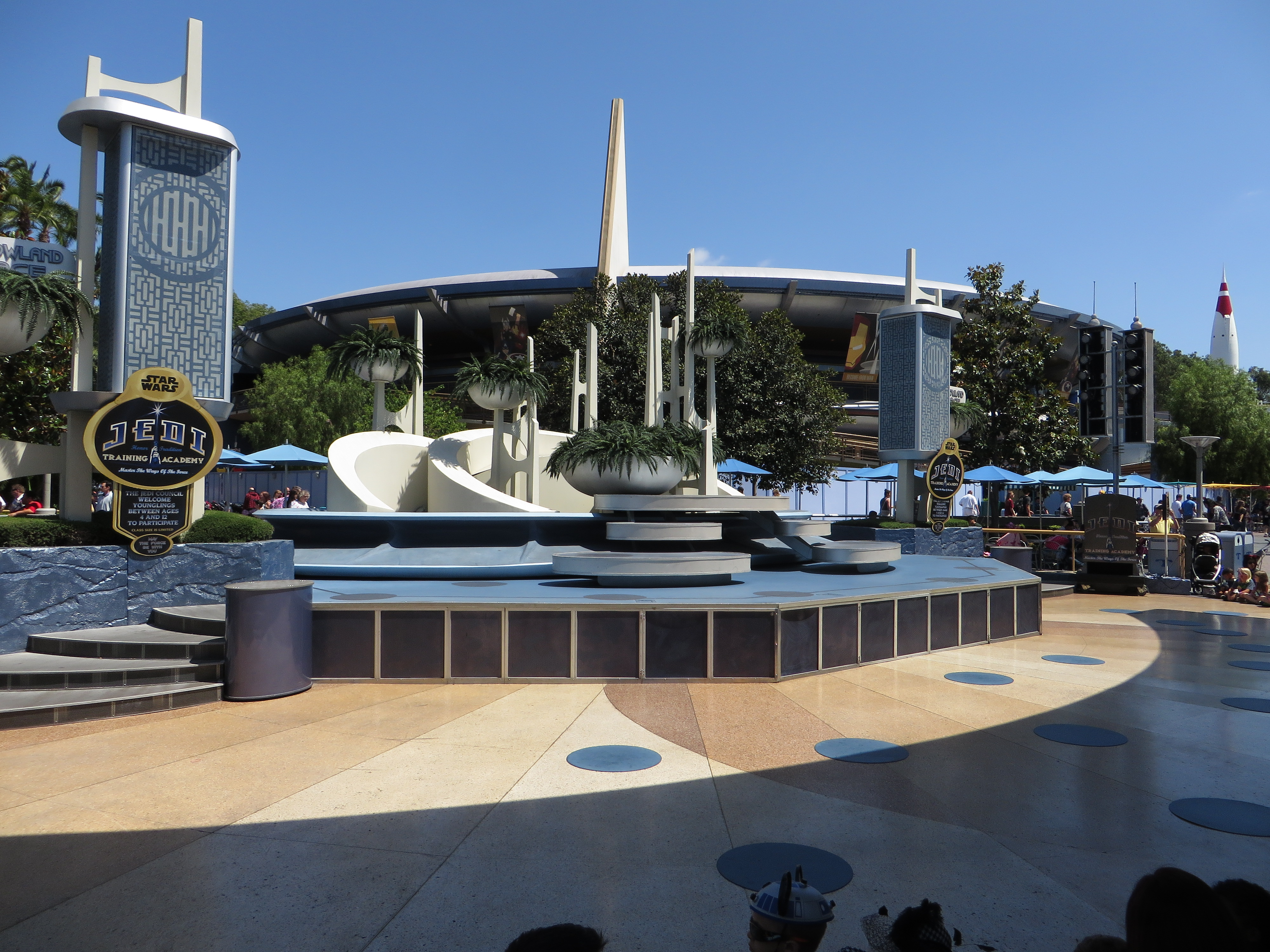
- Tomorrowland Terrace Stage dressed for Jedi Training Academy, 2015.

Restaurant information
- Established: Disneyland Park: July 2, 1967 and fall 2006; Magic Kingdom Park: October 1, 1971 and 2004; Tokyo Disneyland: April 15, 1983
- Closed: Disneyland: 2001 (became Club Buzz) and 2015 (became Galactic Grill); Magic Kingdom: September 1994 (became Cosmic Ray's Starlight Cafe)
- Food type: Quick-service fast food, American

Tomorrowland Terrace is a name given to four quick-service restaurants located at three Disney Parks around the world—each in their respective Tomorrowland sections. The first opened in Disneyland Park in 1967, the second at Magic Kingdom Park in 1971, and the third at Tokyo Disneyland in 1983. The Tokyo version is the only one still operating under that name. A second Tomorrowland Terrace opened at Magic Kingdom (replacing the Plaza Pavilion) in 2004.

== History ==
=== Disneyland ===
The first Tomorrowland Terrace opened in Disneyland Park with the rest of the newly-refurbished Tomorrowland on July 2, 1967. The restaurant was sponsored by Coca-Cola upon opening until the restaurant was redesigned in 1998. Coke's participation was integral to the restaurant, even during the concept phase when the restaurant had the name Coca-Cola Refreshment Garden.

Tomorrowland Terrace opened as (and remains) a counter-service fast food location—serving American fare like hamburgers, hot dogs, and french fries. The service is done at two bays of windows, with pay and pick-up next to one another.

The restaurant is also a live entertainment location and features an outdoor dining area anchored by a stage and terrazzo floor. The stage is an elevated platform and can descend into a basement where the performers can prepare out of the view of guests. Only the roof of the stage is fully visible when it is in the down position—at first topped with a mid-century futuristic sculpture designed by Disney Imagineer Rolly Crump.

During the day, the terrazzo was covered with tables and chairs for additional dining space. At night, the tables and chairs were cleared out so the terrazzo could become and dance floor for the stage.

According to Disneyland Entertainment talent booker Sonny Anderson, the idea for an elevated stage came from Walt Disney himself. During the 1960s, live bands began to play more frequently at Disneyland, and Disney found the makeshift stages in Tomorrowland to be particularly inadequate. Disney told Anderson one night during a performance that he wanted to build a nice permanent stage. The stage opened six months after Walt's death.

Over its first three decades, the Tomorrowland Terrace Stage was used as a focal point for live entertainment during the busy months at Disneyland, as well as special events like Grad Nites. Among the artists who have performed multiple times over the years at Tomorrowland Terrace were Polo, Tomasina, Voyager, Krash, Lazer, The Fab Four, Scot Bruce, Papa Doo Run Run, The '80z All Stars, Suburban Legends, Michael Iceberg and The Bolts. No Doubt played some of their first professional gigs on the stage. The duo Aly and AJ performed in 2005 during Disney's 50th Anniversary Happiest Homecoming on Earth Celebration at the Tomorrowland Terrace and Mitchel Musso played the stage in 2009.

Beginning in the 1990s, the stage's roof sculpture was redone three times to match with current park promotions as well as the changing design aesthetic of Tomorrowland itself. A 35th anniversary version was created (1990) as well as one for the 40th anniversary (1995) and one for the 1998 redesign of Tomorrowland. Also in the 1990s, the underside of the shade canopy for Tomorrowland Terrace, which also contains all of the lighting for the stage, was refurbished as a test for a revamped version of the land called Tomorrowland 2055. The concept was ultimately abandoned for the "Imagination and Beyond" 1998 plans, leaving only the decorative ceiling as a physical manifestation.

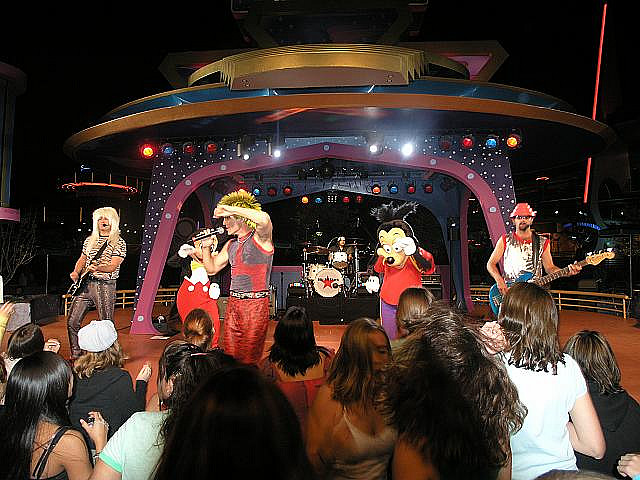
80s All Stars performing at Club Buzz, 2004.

==== Club Buzz ====
On June 30, 2001, Tomorrowland Terrace was renamed Club Buzz—Lightyear's Above the Rest. The restaurant went through a cosmetic retheme around the Toy Story character Buzz Lightyear. The stage featured relics from the character's missions around the galaxy and the sculpture on the roof was remade into the restaurant logo.

The daytime entertainment was a character show called Calling All Space Scouts—A Buzz Lightyear Adventure. The Buzz Lightyear character, voiced by Patrick Warburton from the Buzz Lightyear of Star Command animated series, battled with a reactivated Emperor Zurg. The nighttime entertainment on the stage was a live band, as it had traditionally been with the old Tomorrowland Terrace.

==== Tomorrowland Terrace returns ====
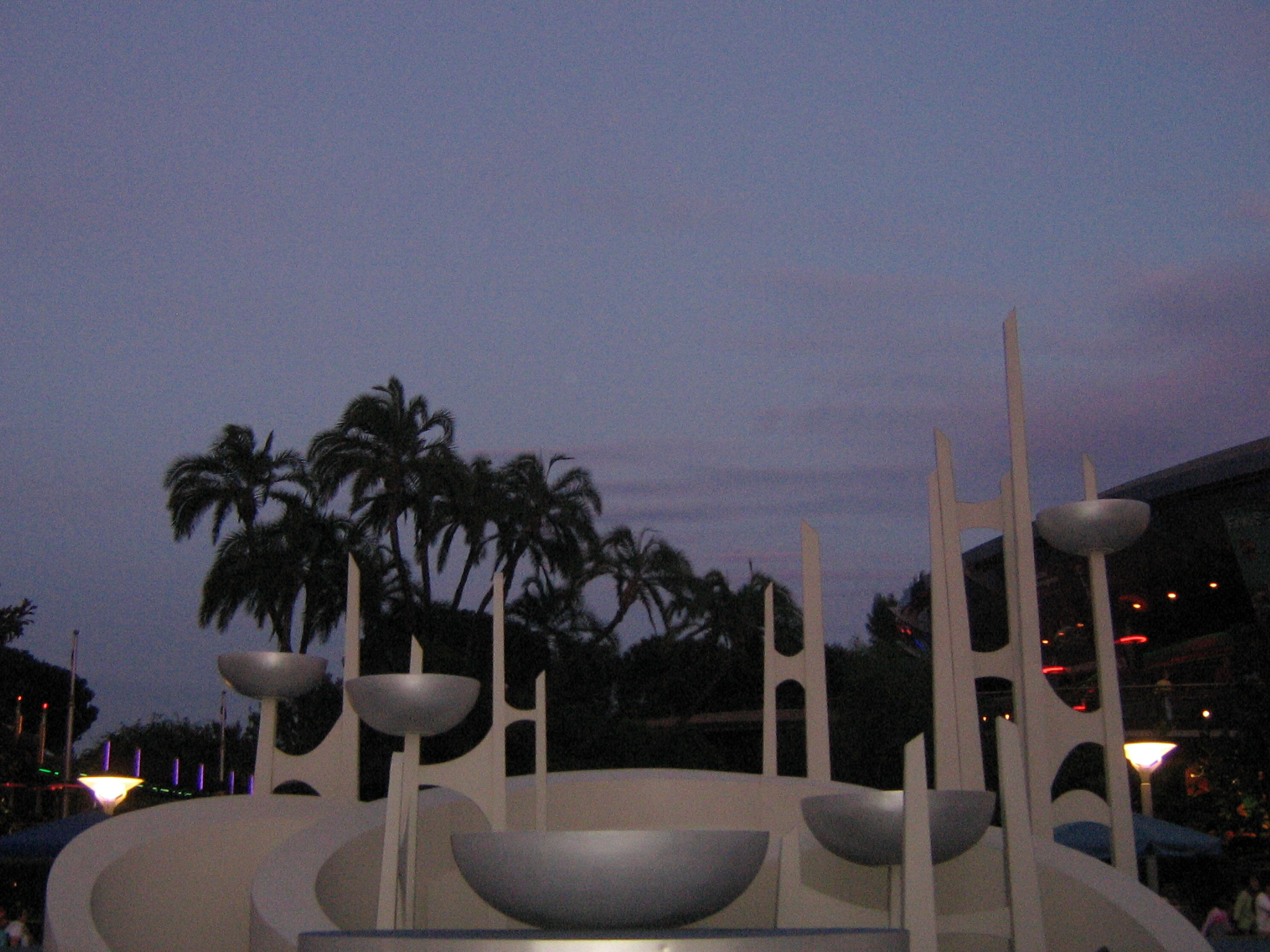
Tomorrowland Terrace at Disneyland as it appears today, with the stage in the down position.

In September 2006, the restaurant was redesigned again, returning to the Tomorrowland Terrace name and an updated version of the original 1967 aesthetic. The sculpture harkened back to the Rolly Crump version, with large bowl-shaped planters and white spires. The restaurant building itself received cosmetic updates, but remained the same structure.

The daytime entertainment on the stage was Jedi Training Academy—a Star Wars-themed show that originated from Disney's Hollywood Studios at Walt Disney World. Children could volunteer to face either Darth Vader or Darth Maul in a lightsaber fight. Evening entertainment was still provided by live bands.

In 2009, as part of the Summer Nightastic! promotion, the stage became the TLT Dance Club, with a DJ selecting music to dance to.

==== Galactic Grill ====
In November 2015, Disneyland made Tomorrowland the center of the Star Wars-themed "Season of the Force" promotion to celebrate the opening of Star Wars: The Force Awakens that December. Tomorrowland Terrace became Galactic Grill, and the menu was changed to Star Wars-related food and desserts. The name remains, even as the promotion has come and gone several times.

=== Magic Kingdom ===
A second Tomorrowland Terrace opened in the Magic Kingdom at the Walt Disney World Resort on October 1, 1971. Unlike the version in California, the Florida Tomorrowland Terrace was a completely enclosed restaurant—designed with Florida's more rainy and humid climate in mind. The Magic Kingdom Tomorrowland Terrace also had a similar menu to the Disneyland version.

Like California, the restaurant also featured an elevated stage, which descended into the network of utilidors located underneath the park. The elevator featured a roof sculpture as well. The Tomorrowland Terrace Stage hosted many live performances and events for two decades—including acts like Michael Iceberg, Hank Williams Jr., and The Police.

==== Cosmic Ray's Starlight Cafe ====
Tomorrowland Terrace closed in September 1994 and reopened that December as Cosmic Ray's Starlight Cafe.

==== New Tomorrowland Terrace ====
A second version of the Tomorrowland Terrace opened at the entrance of Tomorrowland in 2004, replacing the Plaza Pavilion Restaurant. Originally known as the Tomorrowland Terrace Noodle Station, the counter-service restaurant served Asian-inspired dishes.

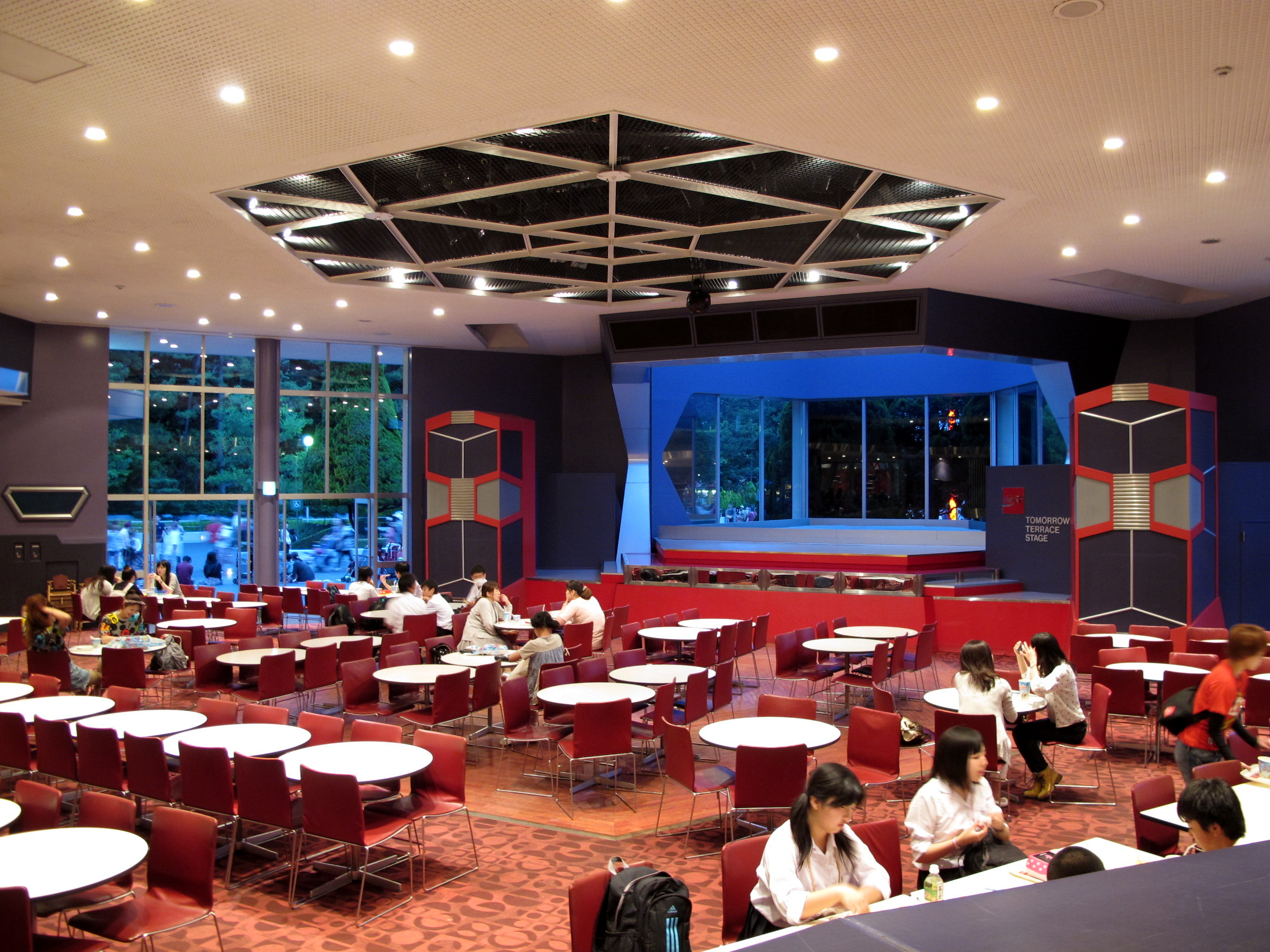
Tomorrowland Terrace at Tokyo Disneyland, 2013.

=== Tokyo Disneyland ===
The Tokyo Disneyland version of Tomorrowland Terrace opened with the park on April 15, 1983. This version has a very similar layout to the Magic Kingdom version—complete with stage (though it has no elevating feature).
