= Thunderball =

Thunderball may refer to:

- Thunderball (novel), 1961 James Bond novel by Ian Fleming
  - Thunderball (film), 1965 film adaptation of the novel starring Sean Connery
  - Thunderball (soundtrack), of the 1965 film
- Thunderball (character), comics character
- Thunderball (Melvins album), 2025
- Thunderball (U.D.O. album), 2004, also the title song
- Thunderball (band), at one time signed to ESL Music
- Operation Thunderball, original name of Operation Entebbe, a 1976 hostage-rescue mission
- Thunderball, a game (draw), introduced in 1999, in the United Kingdom's National Lottery
- Thunderball, fictional game in sketches by comedy troupe Upright Citizens Brigade

== See also ==
- Never Say Never Again, 1983 film adaptation of the novel.
- Ball lightning, a reported, but controversial, atmospheric electrical phenomenon
- Thunderbolt (disambiguation)
  - Thunderbolt, a discharge of lightning, or a symbolic representation of it
