= Michael Iceberg =

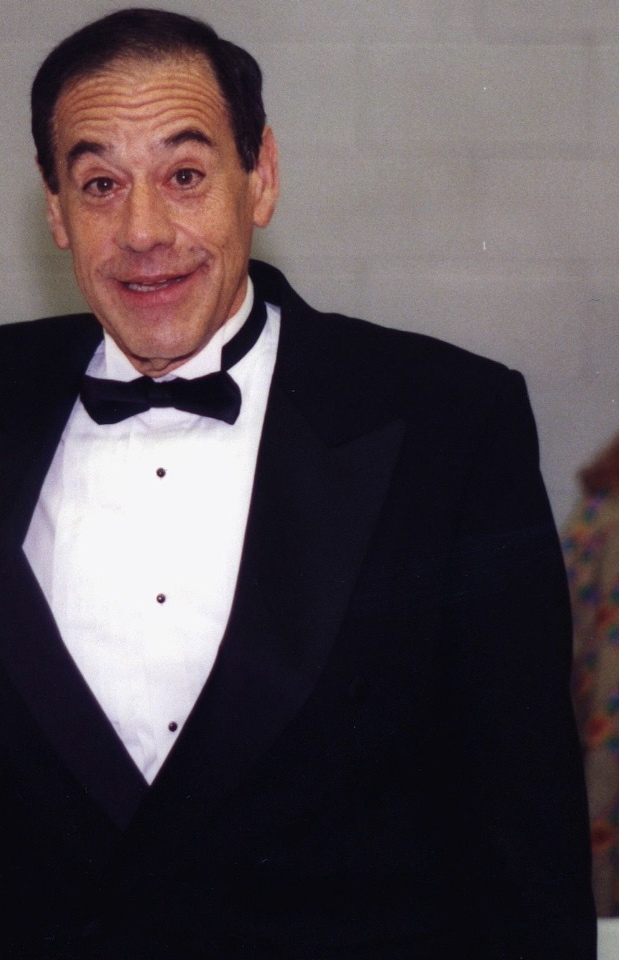
- Iceberg in 2002

Background information
- Born: Michael Iseberg; Aspen, Colorado, U.S.
- Died: June 9, 2026 (aged 86) Baltimore, Maryland, US
- Genres: Electronic
- Occupation: Musician
- Instruments: Keyboards, synthesizers
- Years active: 1975-2005

Michael Iseberg (stage name Michael Iceberg, April 26, 1940 — June 9, 2026) was an American musician and composer. He was best known for his electronic music performances at Walt Disney World and Disneyland from the mid-1970s to the late-1980s, introducing many to what the instruments were capable of. Keyboard Magazine editor Stephen Fortner described seeing Iseberg at Disney World as his "I want to do that" moment.

Iseberg was a classical pianist who studied at Northwestern University and the Juilliard School of Music. He began in the music retail business in Illinois where he owned a pair of piano and organ stores in Illinois and was one of the largest Wurlitzer dealers in the world.

== The Amazing Iceberg Machine ==
By the late 1960s he left the retail business, moved to his native Aspen, Colorado, and began playing area ski resorts and restaurants. Not wanting be known only as an organ player, he modified his Wurlitzer 4300 and began adding electronic instruments like a custom Chamberlin electro-mechanical instrument modified with a bicycle shifter to change voicings as he played, later adding an Oberheim 4-voice synthesizer and DS-2 Digital Sequencer, a prototype Moog Polymoog synthesizer, which was later sold to make way for a Sequential Circuits Prophet-5 synthesizer with sequencer.

Technical problems were not uncommon with these early keyboard technologies, something Iseberg frequently acknowledged in his performances.

He referred to the collection of synthesizers, drum machines, and electro-mechanical instruments that were the precursor to samplers that made up his performance setup as "The Mechanical Contraption" or "The Amazing Iseberg Machine" and later spelling it with the newly adopted stage spelling of "Iceberg"

"The machine is always growing, changing, It started as an organ, then a synthesizer. It's got 20 disc and card drives. This isn't the result of any scientific achievement or anything scholastic. This is the result of compulsive buying" he would describe to audiences.

== Performances ==
He began performing at Disneyland's Tomorrowland Terrace on July 4, 1976, on a 6-week contract. Michael continued performing at several Tomorrowland venues at Disneyland and later at Walt Disney World at the Magic Kingdom as well as the 1982 opening of Communicore at Epcot, performing an original composition entitled "The 21st Century Begins".

He also performed at NAMM shows in the late 1970s, opened for acts such as Kool and the Gang, and composed for the television series Wild America. in the early 1980s. Michael also appeared on The Tonight Show Starring Johnny Carson.

Michael's programs featured arrangements of classical pieces and movie music, including a "Baroque Hoedown", sci-fi oriented movie themes from "Star Wars" and "Close Encounters of the Third Kind", and familiar classical tunes like the "William Tell Overture". Playlists also included showtunes such as Fiddler on the Roof and popular songs such as the Moody Blues' "Nights in White Satin" and John Lennon's "Imagine".

"Fanfare," which he sang at many of his shows. "Fanfare" was written from music Michael played informally. It was arranged and the lyrics were written by Robb Royer (of the band "Bread"), a good friend of Michael's. According to Michael, the words were originally written about Rob's baby daughter Jesse. Later, Michael would introduce the song as "Fanfare for Wendy," referencing his own daughter.

Audiences could see him play his multiple keyboards via overhead mirrors. The "machine" was enclosed in a 10 feet (3.0 m) pyramid, based on the cover of Pink Floyd's Dark Side of the Moon, equipped with lights and a fog machine, which opened to reveal Michael and the Machine inside. Michael continued updating the "machine" through the early 2000s, replacing the mirrors providing overhead views with an overhead camera a video projection.

After leaving Disney, Michael played the Iceberg Machine through the 1990s at corporate engagements for IBM and occasional shows at colleges and air shows.

He explained in a 2013 interview that he had stopped performing because pulmonary hypertension had left him without the stamina needed to perform, especially in moving equipment. Components of his "Iceberg Machine" were sold off when the friend who had helped build and maintain moved on to a new job.

== Death ==
Iseberg died in Baltimore, Maryland, on June 9, 2026, at the age of 86.

== Discography ==
- Iceberg Does It Live (1978)
- Michael Iceberg and the Amazing Iceberg Machine (1983)
- "Homemade" Christmas Carols (1984)
- Michael Iceberg and the Amazing Iceberg Machine (1987)
- Iceberg In Concert (1994)
- Tip of the Iceberg (1994)

== Gallery ==
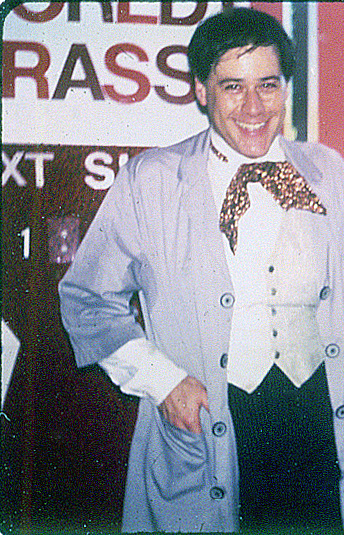
Iceberg at Walt Disney World, August 1980

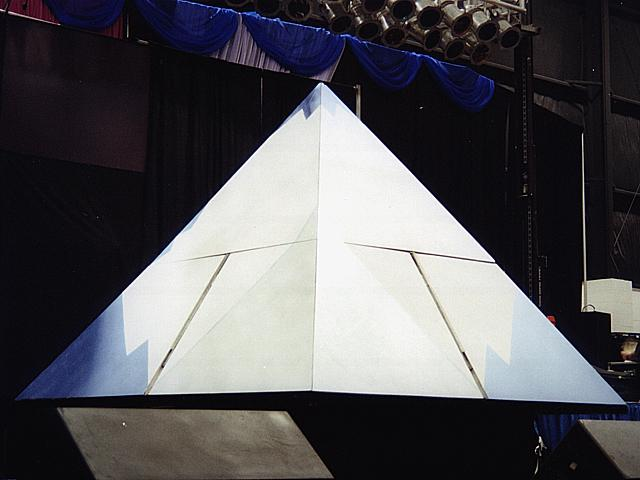
The Amazing Iceberg Machine as seen at the South Florida Fair in January–February 2002

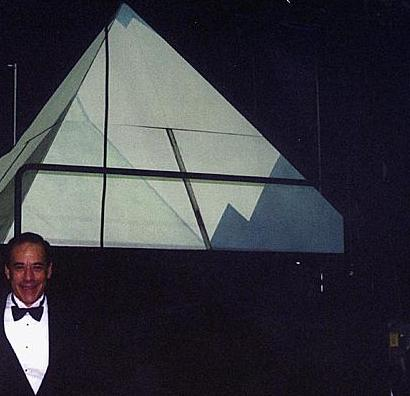
Iceberg with The Amazing Iceberg Machine
