= Thunder Bay (disambiguation) =

Thunder Bay is a city on Lake Superior in the province of Ontario, Canada.

Thunder Bay also refers to several other things in North America's Great Lakes region.

== Places ==
=== In Canada ===
Thunder Bay is the name of several places in the province of Ontario:

- Thunder Bay District, a district in Northwestern Ontario
  - Unorganized Thunder Bay District
  - Thunder Bay (Ontario), a bay of Lake Superior in Ontario for which the district and city are named
- Thunder Bay International Airport or Thunder Bay Water Aerodrome, aerodromes in the city of Thunder Bay
- Thunder Bay, in the Niagara Region, a neighbourhood of Fort Erie, Ontario
- Thunder Bay Port Authority, oversees the operation of Thunder Bay's port on behalf of Transport Canada

==== Electoral districts in Ontario ====
Current

- Thunder Bay—Atikokan (provincial electoral district)
- Thunder Bay—Rainy River
- Thunder Bay—Superior North (federal electoral district)
- Thunder Bay—Superior North (provincial electoral district)

Defunct

- Thunder Bay—Atikokan
- Thunder Bay (electoral district)
- Thunder Bay and Rainy River

=== In the United States ===
Thunder Bay is the name of several places in the US state of Michigan

- Thunder Bay (Michigan), a bay of Lake Huron on which the city of Alpena is located
- Thunder Bay National Marine Sanctuary, marine sanctuary and underwater preserve which encompasses Thunder Bay and follows Alpena County's borders
- Thunder Bay Island, an island within the sanctuary, near Thunder Bay
- Thunder Bay River, a river which empties into Thunder Bay
- A fictional city in the film Anatomy of a Murder

== Sport ==
- Thunder Bay Border Cats, a baseball team in Thunder Bay, Ontario, which is part of the collegiate summer Northwoods League
- Thunder Bay Chill, an association football team founded in 2000 in Thunder Bay, Ontario, which is part of the Premier Development League
- Thunder Bay North Stars, a Junior "A" ice hockey team founded in 2000 in Thunder Bay, Ontario, which is part of the Superior International Junior League
- Thunder Bay Northern Hawks, a Junior "B" ice hockey team founded in 1999 in Thunder Bay, Ontario, which is part of the Thunder Bay Junior B Hockey League
- Thunder Bay Fighting Walleye, a Junior "B" ice hockey team founded in 2009 in Thunder Bay, Ontario, which is part of the Thunder Bay Junior B Hockey League

=== Defunct ===
- Thunder Bay Bearcats, a Junior "A" ice hockey team in Thunder Bay, Ontario, part of the Superior International Junior League (2006–2009)
- Thunder Bay Beavers, a Junior "A" ice hockey team in Thunder Bay, Ontario, part of the Junior A League 1971–1978; previously known as the Vulcans and the Centennials
- Thunder Bay Bombers, a senior ice hockey team in Thunder Bay, Ontario; it had been previously known as the Twins
- Thunder Bay Bulldogs, a Junior "A" ice hockey team in Thunder Bay, Ontario, part of the Superior International Junior League (2001–2008)
- Thunder Bay Flyers, a Junior "A" ice hockey team in Thunder Bay, Ontario, part of the Junior A League (1980–2000); previously known as the Kings
- Thunder Bay Hornets, a Junior "A" ice hockey team in Thunder Bay, Ontario, part of the Junior A League (1982–1986)
- Thunder Bay Thunder Cats, an ice hockey team in Thunder Bay, Ontario, 1991–1999 before moving to Rockford; previously known as the Thunder Hawks and Senators
- Thunder Bay Twins, an ice hockey team in Thunder Bay, Ontario, 1970–1991, member of several leagues during its existence
- Thunder Bay Whiskey Jacks, a baseball team in Thunder Bay, Ontario, 1993–1998, one of the founding members of the independent Northern League

== Other uses ==
- Thunder Bay (film), a 1953 film directed by Anthony Mann
- Thunder Bay Press, a book publisher
- Thunder Bay (podcast), a 2018 investigative podcast series directed and hosted by Ryan McMahon
- Thunder Bay (ship), a bulk carrier operated on the North American Great Lakes by the Canada Steamship Lines

== See also ==
- Thunderbird Bay, Texas
