= Bro Bowl =

Historic place in Florida, United States

- Perry Harvey Sr. Park Skateboard Bowl
- U.S. National Register of Historic Places
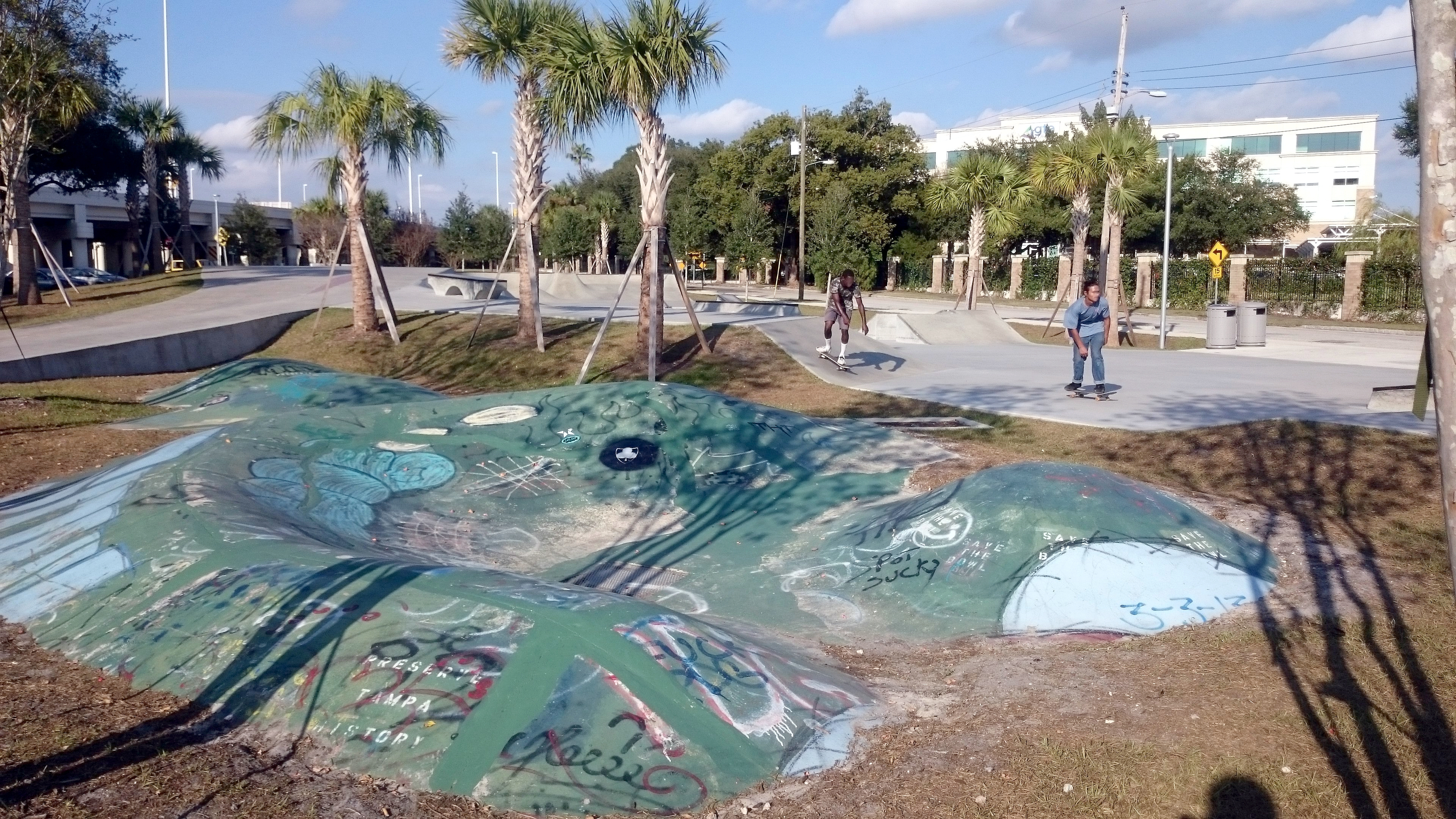
- Bro Bowl in 2016

- Location within Florida Location within the United States
- Location: Tampa, Florida, U.S.
- Coordinates: 27.9550236°N 82.455622°W
- Built: 1978
- NRHP reference No.: 13000811
- Added to NRHP: October 7, 2013

The Bro Bowl is one of the last remaining skateboard parks of the 1970s and the first public skatepark to be built in Florida, United States. It is the first skatepark to be listed on any national registry of historic sites.

Located at Perry Harvey Sr. Park in Tampa, Florida, this facility opened in 1979. The Bro Bowl is a bank-style park more similar to the first generation skateparks of 1976-1977 rather than the late seventies parks which tended to focus on vert. What is also unusual about the Bro Bowl is that it was constructed as a free public skatepark during a time when most parks were private profit-driven ventures. In 1998, the Bro Bowl was featured in the fourth Birdhouse video, The End, starring Thrasher Magazine's pro skateboarder of the year, Andrew Reynolds. In 2010 the Bro Bowl became the subject of a documentary titled "The Bro Bowl: 30 Years of Tampa Concrete."

The Bro Bowl takes its name from its proximity to the city of Tampa's projects. In the early years, it was common to hear skaters refer to the bowl as the place where the brothers riot. Over the years, the press, and even the mayor of Tampa have lost track of the history of the park and openly refer to the park by its colourful name.

It was listed on the National Register of Historic Places in 2013 as the Perry Harvey Sr. Park Skateboard Bowl.

It is apparently the first skatepark, world-wide, to be recognized on a national historic registry. The Rom, built in 1978 in east London, England, was the second; it became Grade II listed in 2014.

The original skatepark was demolished as part of a renovation of Perry Harvey Sr. Park and replaced with an updated design heavily inspired by the original.

The Bro Bowl is one of the available points of interest in the Tampa level of the video game, Tony Hawk's Underground.
