= God of Thunder (disambiguation) =

God of Thunder may refer to:

- A thunder god
- Thor Hushovd, nicknamed The God of Thunder, former Norwegian professional road bicycle racer
- God of Thunder (EP), an EP by White Zombie
- "God of Thunder" (song), by the rock band Kiss
- God of Thunder (video game), a 2D freeware puzzle game for MS-DOS
- Thor: God of Thunder, a video game based on the movie Thor
- God of Thunder (1971 film), a film by Ousmane Sembène also known as Emitaï
- Gods of Thunder: A Norwegian Tribute to Kiss, a 2005 album

== See also ==
- List of thunder gods
- Leishen (雷神) God of Thunder
- Leigong (雷公) Lord of Thunder
