= Thunderbolt (album) =

Album by Saxon

Studio album by Saxon
- Released: 2 February 2018
- Recorded: 2017
- Genre: Heavy metal
- Length: 42:46
- Label: Silver Lining Music
- Producer: Andy Sneap

Saxon chronology
Let Me Feel Your Power (2016)	Thunderbolt (2018)	Inspirations (2021)

Professional ratings
Review scores
Source	Rating
Metal Hammer (Germany)	5/7

Thunderbolt is the twenty-second studio album by British heavy metal band Saxon, released on 2 February 2018.

== Background ==
On 14 September 2016, the band revealed they had begun writing songs for the new album through their Facebook account. A month later, frontman Biff Byford revealed they had written a song dedicated to Motörhead called "They Played Rock n Roll", following the death of frontman Lemmy on 28 December 2015, which ended the band's 40-year history. The song is stylistically similar and referenced their touring companionship on the 1979/1980 "Bomber" tour.

In an interview alongside Airbourne frontman Joel O'Keeffe at 2017's Metal Hammer Golden Gods Awards, Byford confirmed that the album's title would be Thunderbolt and that the inspiration for it came from the gods of Greek mythology.

Further details were revealed on various stops on their autumn tour of the US and Canada. In an interview at their Newton, New Jersey show on 22 September, he revealed that he'd finished recording his vocals on 20 September. In an interview at their Montreal, Canada show on 4 October, Byford revealed that long-time producer Andy Sneap had finished mixing the album the previous day and mentioned a release date of 21 January 2018 (which later turned out to be incorrect).

On 7 November 2017, the band confirmed the title and revealed the release date of 2 February 2018, track list, artwork and a short UK/European tour alongside Diamond Head, with Magnum and Rock Goddess supporting on select UK dates.

On 30 November 2017, the new video "Thunderbolt" was released. The Record and especially the Motörhead Tribute Song on the Album, They Played Rock N Roll, is especially dedicated to former Motörhead guitarist Fast Eddie Clarke who died the previous month from pneumonia and chronic obstructive pulmonary disease on 10 January 2018, just a month before Thunderbolt Albums release. On 19 September 2018, the "Predator" video was released.

== Track listing ==
All music composed by Biff Byford, Doug Scarratt, Nigel Glockler, Paul Quinn, Nibbs Carter.

No.	Title	Length
1.	"Olympus Rising" (Instrumental)	1:32
2.	"Thunderbolt"	3:59
3.	"The Secret of Flight"	5:02
4.	"Nosferatu (The Vampire's Waltz)"	5:00
5.	"They Played Rock and Roll"	3:39
6.	"Predator"	3:17
7.	"Sons of Odin"	5:22
8.	"Sniper"	3:36
9.	"A Wizard’s Tale"	3:52
10.	"Speed Merchants"	3:47
11.	"Roadie's Song"	3:31
Total length:		42:46

Digipak Bonus Track & Japan bonus track
No.	Title	Length
12.	"Nosferatu (The Vampire's Waltz)" (Raw Version)	5:01
Total length:		47:47

Special Tour Edition Bonus Tracks
No.	Title	Length
1.	"Nosferatu (The Vampire's Waltz)" (Raw Version)	5:01
2.	"Thunderbolt" (Live in Frankfurt – Recorded on 2 March 2018)	3:44
3.	"Nosferatu (The Vampire's Waltz)" (Live in Los Angeles – Recorded on 22 April 2018)	4:26
Total length:		55:57

== Credits ==
- Biff Byford – vocals
- Paul Quinn – guitars
- Doug Scarratt – guitars
- Nibbs Carter – bass
- Nigel Glockler – drums

Additional Musicians

- Seb Byford – backing vocals on "Thunderbolt" and "Speed Merchants"
- Tom Witts – backing vocals on "Thunderbolt" and "Speed Merchants"
- Caleb Quaye – backing vocals on "Thunderbolt" and "Speed Merchants"
- Corvin Bahn – keyboards on "Nosferatu (The Vampire's Waltz)"
- Johan Hegg – harsh vocals on "Predator"
- Andy Sneap – first guitar solo on "They Played Rock and Roll"

Production

- Billy Lee – photography
- Steph Byford – artwork (additional)
- Gestaltungskommando Buntmetall – layout, design
- Paul Raymond Gregory – cover art
- Andy Sneap – producer, engineering, mixing

== Charts ==
Chart (2018)	Peak position
Austrian Albums (Ö3 Austria)	18
Belgian Albums (Ultratop Flanders)	53
Belgian Albums (Ultratop Wallonia)	48
Czech Albums (ČNS IFPI)	29
Dutch Albums (Album Top 100)	172
French Albums (SNEP)	113
German Albums (Offizielle Top 100)	5
Italian Albums (FIMI)	53
Japanese Albums (Oricon)	181
Scottish Albums (Official Charts)	10
Spanish Albums (PROMUSICAE)	39
Swedish Albums (Sverigetopplistan)	13
Swiss Albums (Schweizer Hitparade)	6
UK Albums (Official Charts)	29
UK Independent Albums (Official Charts)	4
UK Rock & Metal Albums (Official Charts)	2
