= The Rom =

- The Rom skatepark in 2026
- Interactive map of The Rom
- 51.556°N 0.188°E
- Location: Hornchurch, East London, England

History
- Built: 1978

Site notes
- Area: 8,000 square metres (86,000 sq ft)
- Architect: Adrian Rolt

Listed Building – Grade II
- Official name: The Rom Skatepark
- Designated: 11 September 2014
- Reference no.: 1419328

The Rom is a Grade II listed skatepark in Hornchurch, East London, England. Built in 1978 and designed by Adrian Rolt of G-Force, it is the most completely preserved purpose-built skatepark in England. It is the first skatepark in Europe to achieve listed status and the second such structure worldwide.

== History ==
The Rom was built and opened in August 1978 and named after the adjacent River Rom. It was designed by Adrian Rolt of G-Force. Rolt is considered the leading skatepark designer of the 1970s. In 1979 John Greenwood took control of the Rom skatepark and kept it open for skateboarders and BMXers until 2018.

In 2014 it was given Grade II listed status becoming only the second skateboard park in the world to achieve preservation status after the Bro Bowl in Tampa, Florida. Since the Bro Bowl has subsequently been 3D scanned, demolished, and rebuilt in a different location of the same park area the Rom is now the only heritage listed full size skatepark in existence.

A film about the history of the park, Rom Boys: 40 Years of Rad, is currently on general release on major streaming platforms.

== Layout ==
Shotcrete area

The skatepark occupies an area of 8,000 square metres (86,000 sq ft). The central 4,000 square metres (43,000 sq ft) is surfaced in Shotcrete pressurised concrete.

== See also ==
- Harrow Skate Park
- Black Lion Skatepark
- Bro Bowl, Florida, USA, first skatepark listed on a national historic registry, in 2013
