= Harrow Skate Park =

Shotcrete skatepark in the United Kingdom

Coordinates: 51.593°N 0.3255°W

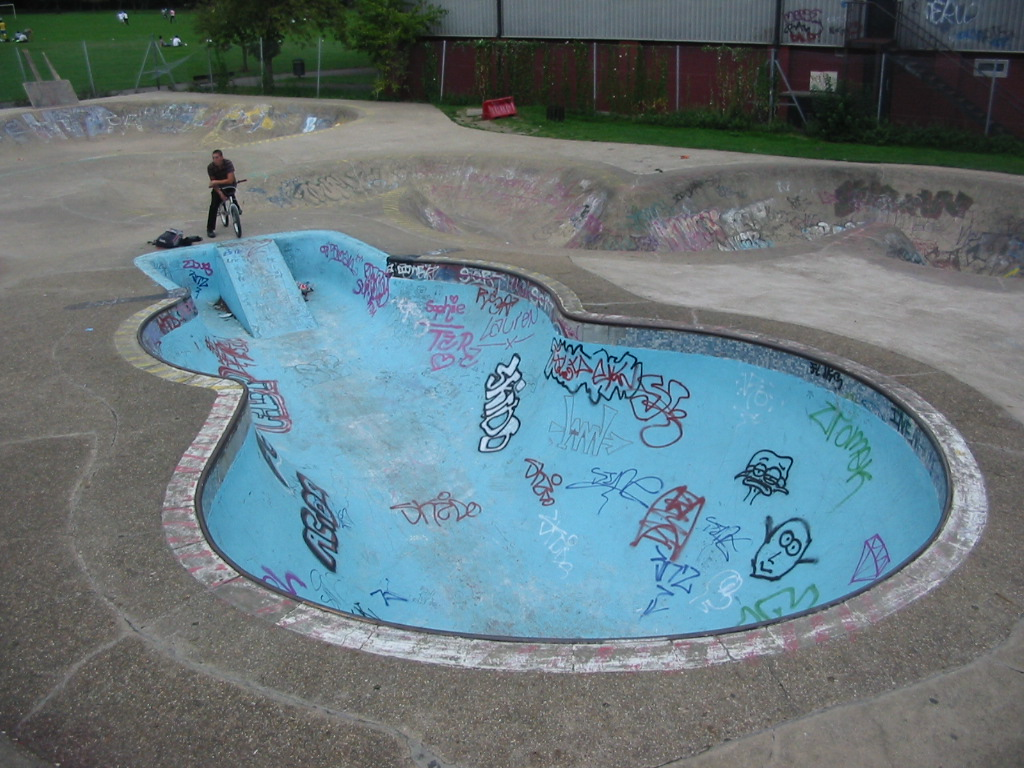
The pool at Harrow

Harrow Skate Park or Harrow Solid Surf is one of only two remaining 1970s shotcrete skateparks still operating in the United Kingdom. It is located next to Byron Park and Harrow Leisure Centre in Wealdstone in the London Borough of Harrow, England.

Primarily because of its age and design, it is one of the most noted skateparks in the UK and is favourably compared to other classic seventies skatepark designs such as Marina del Rey (Los Angeles) and "Pipeline" (Upland, California) in the US.

== History ==
The skatepark's planning began in 1976 and it was completed and opened to the public on 15 July 1978. It was designed by G-Force designer Adrian Rolt and was built by Skate Park Construction, assisted by Jim Rennie and Rodga Harvey as design consultants, the leading skateboard park construction and design team in the UK at the time. Its pool design was based on the keyhole pool at Skateboard Heaven in Spring Valley, California.

== Features ==
Ground-level view

Current features include a concrete half-pipe, The Pool, a street section with a concrete bank and a wooden quarter pipe (this section previously included a metal box and metal quarter pipe that had to be removed for safety reasons), the snakerun, and four moguls. The performance bowl was filled in a number of years ago by the council and remains out of action despite attempts to dig it out. The park did have other recent additions such as a mini ramp, but that was destroyed by local vandals. The park operates free of charge and is open from 9:00 am till dusk.

Due to the site's uniqueness, the UK skateboarding, roller skating and BMX scene use the park as a place to hang out and socialise as well as to ride the ramps. Since the seventies the park has been the starting ground for a number of professional skaters and BMX users such as Steve Douglas. Its significance has been noted by the architectural historian Professor Iain Borden, who said it was used in the eighties by "the best-known London skaters and 'H-Boyz' (Harrow regulars)". It has been threatened with closure on a number of occasions and was out-of-action for a few years in the eighties. In 2003 it was reopened after the Council spent £60,000 refurbishing it; the opening ceremony was attended by the chairman of the Metropolitan Police Authority Toby Harris, Baron Harris of Haringey and Harrow East MP and Minister for London Tony McNulty.

== 2007–2008 threat of closure ==
In 2007, Harrow Council announced plans to build over the site as part of a £36m project to replace Harrow Leisure Centre with a smaller building. This led to a storm of protest from users and the international skateboarding community, who regarded it as "irreplaceable". The plan involved selling the existing site to developers. Although the council was offering £300,000 to replace the park experts have said it will cost at least £600,000 to replace the park. The world-famous skater Tony Hawk stated on the closure "If they feel that the park is truly irreplaceable, then they should keep it ... I've never been, but I have seen it in magazines and heard about it through the years." On 6 February 2008 Sport England condemned the leisure centre plan:

Sport England considers the proposals to be damaging to a wide range of existing sporting interests and they would reduce opportunities for participation in sport and active recreation in the borough." Mr Durrans supported the objections already voiced by various sports groups in the borough, including Harrow and Wealdstone Swimming Club, Harrow Squash Club, Wembley and Harrow Table Tennis League and the Harrow Skatepark Users' Association.

In October 2008 it was revealed that Harrow Council's plans to demolish the park and build a new leisure centre had been abandoned. The plan was to sell land in and around the site of Harrow Leisure Centre, where the skatepark is based, to fund a new building and skatepark. However, with house prices dropping the council was unable to generate the money it needed to fund the project. A BMX rider at Harrow Skatepark, said:

It's brilliant. I'm just absolutely over the moon. I hope it stays there for another few years and they don't say "we've got a bit of money now, so we can knock it down."

Harrow Councillor Marilyn Ashton blamed the cancellation of the leisure centre regeneration project on the depressed housing market – and said plans would be deferred until the council could raise the money. She said, "I think we could have done with another leisure centre and a brand new assembly hall".

Rio Joseph, Youth development officer of Harrow Skate Park, led the campaign against the new leisure centre: "Other people agree or disagree with the plans, but it ain't going to happen, not for a long time."

On 31 October 2008, there was a "Harroween" skate jam to celebrate Harrow Skate Park not being demolished.

== Access ==
The skate park is next to Harrow Leisure Centre and Byron recreation ground, and is walking distance from Harrow & Wealdstone station.

== In popular culture ==
Singer-songwriter Kate Nash, a Harrow native, recorded parts of her music video for I Hate You This Christmas at the park.

== See also ==
- The Rom
- Black Lion Skatepark
