= USS Thunder =

Tender of the United States Navy

History

United States
- Ordered: as Annie Dees
- Acquired: 9 December 1863
- In service: 1864
- Out of service: 1865
- Captured: by Union Navy forces; on 20 November 1862
- Fate: Sold, 8 August 1865

General characteristics
- Propulsion: sloop sail

USS Thunder was a blockade running steamer captured by the Union Navy during the American Civil War.

== Service history ==
Thunder was purchased by the Union Navy at the prize court and outfitted her as a ship's tender used to support Union ships in the South Atlantic blockade of the Confederate States of America. Blockade runner, Annie Dees, was captured by Union screw gunboat USS Seneca off Charleston, South Carolina, on 20 November 1862 and was purchased by the Navy from the New York City Prize Court on 9 December 1863. Renamed Thunder, the sloop joined the South Atlantic Blockading Squadron for use as a ship’s tender. During October 1864, she operated off Wassaw Sound, Georgia, and returned to Port Royal, South Carolina, in November for repairs. Thunder serviced blockade vessels off the Savannah River, Georgia, in January and February 1865 and spent most of the remaining months of the war on duty off Tybee Island, South Carolina. Thunder was sold at Port Royal on 8 August 1865 to John Smith.

== See also ==
- Blockade runners of the American Civil War
- Blockade mail of the Confederacy
