= Videopolis (Disneyland Paris) =

Disneyland Paris attraction

- Attraction poster

Disneyland Park (Paris)
- Area: Discoveryland
- Status: Operating
- Opening date: April 12, 1992

Ride statistics
- Attraction type: Restaurant / Stage Show
- Designer: Walt Disney Imagineering
- Theme: Air Exploration
- Wheelchair accessible

Videopolis is an auditorium in the Disneyland Park at Disneyland Paris, near Marne-la-Vallée. It was an opening day attraction launched in 1992, and is located within the Discoveryland section of the park, an alternate take on the Tomorrowland concept, which takes into consideration the science fiction pioneered by the likes of Jules Verne, H. G. Wells or Leonardo da Vinci.

== Theme ==
The building is themed to dreams of the future from the turn of the twentieth century, especially air exploration. The airship hanging outside the building is from the 1974 film, The Island at the Top of the World. Videopolis also houses the Café Hyperion, the largest fast-food restaurant in the park. This building features inspiration from Discovery Bay, a former Disneyland concept by Imagineer Tony Baxter (a land themed to Victorian visions of the future), which also inspired Discoveryland.

Imagineers provided this former airship station with a whole back-story. The Hyperion once took explorers to 49 destinations, until one day when its captain mysteriously disappeared, leaving her ready for her last journey that never was. She is henceforth waiting for her master to return. The station was soon turned into a place where guests could rest and have meals.

== History ==
The original premise for Videopolis was based somewhat on an earlier concept used at Disneyland in California, in that a theatre acts as a venue for a night-time disco in addition to its function as an auditorium for performance.

The original concept, however, changed due to public interests. The night-time discos were meant to appeal to teenagers and young adults as a mean of topping off their day. Yet, they were more interested in visiting other attractions up until the last minute. The regular discos therefore came to a halt, and Videopolis is only used as such a venue for special events such as New Year's Eve and Halloween.

In between the live shows, music videos were to be played. Yet after complaints from families incidentally dining in the Café Hyperion, these were replaced with cartoons.

The original daytime show from 1992 was equally themed to the auditorium's original contemporary, pop-culture theme and to Discoveryland's visionary theme. Called Rock Shock, it featured a gang of teenagers journeying in the footsteps of Jules Verne to the beat of rock music. It was a relative success.

Yet, demand for more shows based on traditional Disney properties led to its replacement with a stage version of Beauty and the Beast. After that came several shows based on Disney productions or characters, most prominently stage versions of Mulan or The Lion King.

The theater was previously showcasing a various choice of Disney cartoons, from the early animated ones (for example Steamboat Willie) to Pixar shorts, however is now The Jedi Training academy, and has been themed with scenes and characters from Star Wars: The Force Awakens.

== List of Videopolis shows ==
- Rock Shock (1992–1993) – Returned in 1995 for Space Mountain opening.
- Beauty and the Beast (1993–1996)
- Disney Classics – The Music and the Magic (1998)
- Disney Magic Forever (1998)
- Mulan – The Legend (1998–2002)
- Minnie's Birthday Surprise (2002–2003)
- Mickey's Showtime (2003–2004)
- The Legend of the Lion King (2004–2009)
- Cinema Mickey (2009–2010)
- CineDisney (2010–2015)
- Jedi Training Academy (2015–2017)
- Disney Music Hits Concert (2025)

== Design ==
- The idea of using the airship from The Island at the Top of the World in a Disney attraction was considered for Disneyland's planned Discovery Bay, but was scrapped after that film's failure at the box office.
- There are two binocular-shaped blocked windows on the side of the building, which originally were to have acted as passageways to Discovery Mountain (which has been replaced with Space Mountain). In the original concept, guests would have been able to go on numerous rides within this domed attraction, themed to many Jules Verne's visions.
- Behind these two windows is a Studio Radio, regularly used when reporters want to broadcast live from the park.
- Two rooms are located beneath this Studio, accessible via ground floor. They originally acted as a Space Exhibition in 1995, as Space Mountain was inaugurated. Later, in 2004, they were turned respectively into Arcade Alpha and Arcade Bêta. The arcades have both since been stripped out leaving no arcade machines left and so currently these rooms are empty.
