= Operation Thunderbolt =

Operation Thunderbolt may refer to:

- Operation Donnerkeil or Operation Thunderbolt, a World War II air-support campaign
- Operation Thunderbolt (1951), an offensive operation during the Korean War
- Operation Entebbe or Operation Thunderbolt, a hostage rescue mission in 1976
- Operation Thunderbolt, a mission to rescue hostages from the 1991 Singapore Airlines Flight 117 hijacking
- Operation Thunderbolt (1997), an offensive operation during the Second Sudanese Civil War and First Congo War
- Operation Thunderbolt (2016), a Bangladesh Army Special Forces operation to end the Gulshan hostage crisis
- Operation Thunderbolt (film), a film about Operation Entebbe
- Operation Thunderbolt (video game), a 1988 arcade game by Taito
