= Seven Thunders =

The Seven Thunders are mentioned in the biblical Book of Revelation (see Events of Revelation (Chapter 10)). The term may also refer to:

- Seven Thunders (film), a 1957 war film
- "Seven Thunders", a track from Breaking the Chains (Dokken album)
- Seven Thunders, the last volume of South African author Sarah Millin's diary
