= Castle Thunder =

Castle Thunder may refer to:

- Castle Thunder (house), a house in Catonsville, Maryland, from 1787 to 1907
- Castle Thunder (prison), a prison in Richmond, Virginia, during the American Civil War
- Castle thunder (sound effect), a famous sound effect originally recorded for the 1931 version of Frankenstein, and later used by many movies
