= Bolt, Wisconsin =

- Unincorporated community
- Location within Wisconsin Location within the United States
- Coordinates: 44°20′31″N 87°42′19″W
- Country: United States
- State: Wisconsin
- County: Kewaunee
- Town: Franklin
- Elevation: 725 ft (221 m)
- Time zone: UTC-6 (Central (CST))
  - Summer (DST): UTC-5 (CDT)
- Area code: 920
- GNIS feature ID: 1562043

Bolt is an unincorporated community in the town of Franklin, Kewaunee County, Wisconsin, United States. It is located on County Highway Q, 6 miles (9.7 km) east of the village of Denmark.
