= Rolling Thunder Cyclocross Race =

Rolling Thunder
Race details
- Date: October
- Region: Western Montana, United States
- Discipline: Cyclo-cross
- Type: One-day
- Organiser: Shaun Radley
- Race director: Shaun Radley

History
- First edition: 2006
- Editions: 9
- First winner: Clint Muhlfeld (USA) Nylene Wicks (USA)
- Most wins: Clint Muhlfeld (USA) Sam Schultz (USA) Steve Fisher (USA) 2 times Lisa Curry (USA) 3 times
- Most recent: Justin Doll (USA) Andi Zolton (USA)

Rolling Thunder Cyclocross Race is a premier bicycle racing event held in Missoula, MT every October. The race is characterized by nighttime racing, competitive fields, and challenging courses. Past winners have included regional strongmen Clint "The Lung" Muhlfeld, Sam Krieg, and Subaru-Trek rider Sam Schultz.

== Rolling Thunder Axe ==
The Rolling Thunder Axe is a traveling trophy that is awarded to the highest placing rider from Montana in the Elite Men's race. The axe is adorned with the name of each winner, and comes with a free entry to the next edition of the race.

== Past winners ==
Men
Year	Winner
2006	Clint Muhlfeld
2007	Clint Muhlfeld
2008	Sam Krieg
2009	Sam Schultz
2010	Sam Schultz
2011	Kevin Bradford-Parrish
2012	Steve Fisher
2013	Steve Fisher
2014	Justin Doll

Women
Year	Winner
2006	Nylene Wicks
2007	Lisa Speegle
2008	Amy Frykman
2009	Lisa Curry
2010	Lisa Curry
2011	Anna Dingman
2012	Amanda Carey
2013	Elizabeth English
2014	Andi Zolton
