= Thunderer =

Thunderer may refer to:

== Media ==
- "The Thunderer", a march composed by John Philip Sousa in 1889
- Thunderer, a novel by British writer of fantasy and weird fiction, Felix Gilman
- "The Thunderer", a song from the 2007 Dion album, Son of Skip James
- The Times (also the "Thunderer"), a British daily national newspaper based in London

=== Characters ===
- Thunderer (Marvel Comics), a superhero appearing in American comic books published by Timely Comics
- Thunderer (DC Comics), the name of several characters in DC Comics
- Thunderer, a character from the American animated web series The 7th Portal

== Ships ==
- HMS Thunderer (1760), a 74-gun third rate ship of the line of the Royal Navy
- HMS Thunderer (1783), a ship of the line of the Royal Navy
- HMS Thunderer (1831), a two-deck 84-gun second rate ship of the line
- HMS Thunderer (1872), one of two Devastation-class ironclad turret ships built for the Royal Navy in the 1870s
- HMS Thunderer (1911), the fourth and last Orion-class dreadnought battleship built for the Royal Navy in the early 1910s
- HMS Thunderer, a planned Lion-class battleship
- Thunderer, a 1943 Empire ship originally named Empire Dolly
- Russian cruiser Gromoboi (English: Thunderer), an armoured cruiser built for the Imperial Russian Navy in the late 1890s

== Other ==
- Colt M1877 (unofficially known as the "Thunderer"), a double-action revolver manufactured by Colt's Patent Fire Arms
- Elijah (also known as Elijah the Thunderer), a mythological prophet and miracle worker who lived in Israel
- Royal Naval Engineering College (also called HMS Thunderer), a specialist establishment for the training of Royal Navy engineers
- The Thunderer (Wyoming), a mountain peak in Yellowstone National Park

== See also ==
- Thunder (disambiguation)
