= Jedi Training: Trials of the Temple =

Attraction at Disney parks

- Jedi Training Academy logo

Disney's Hollywood Studios
- Area: Echo Lake
- Coordinates: 28.3550986°N 81.5597773°W
- Status: Removed
- Opening date: October 9, 2007 (original version) (Note: The experience was previously only offered during Star Wars Weekends); December 1, 2015 (current version)
- Closing date: October 5, 2015 (original version); March 16, 2020 (current version)

Disneyland
- Area: Tomorrowland
- Coordinates: 33.8123827°N 117.9171307°W
- Status: Removed
- Opening date: October 1, 2006 (original version); December 8, 2015 (current version)
- Closing date: November 15, 2015 (original version); November 4, 2018 (current version)
- Replaced by: Stitch’s Interplanetary Beach Party Blast!

Disneyland Park Paris
- Name: Jedi Training Academy
- Area: Discoveryland
- Coordinates: 48.874227°N 2.778093°E
- Status: Removed
- Opening date: July 11, 2015
- Closing date: September 3, 2017
- Replaced: CineDisney
- Replaced by: Big Band Beats

Hong Kong Disneyland
- Name: Jedi Training: Trials of the Temple 絕地聖殿武士特訓
- Area: Tomorrowland
- Status: Removed
- Soft opening date: June 23, 2016
- Opening date: June 25, 2016
- Closing date: May 31, 2021
- Replaced: UFO Zone
- Replaced by: Guardians of the Galaxy: Awesome Dance Off!

Ride statistics
- Attraction type: Live show
- Theme: Star Wars
- Participants per group: 16+
- Duration: 20 minutes
- Age restriction: 4–12 years old 7–12 years old (Paris)
- Wheelchair accessible

Jedi Training: Trials of the Temple (previously known as Jedi Training Academy) was a guest experience based on the Jedi teachings found in the Star Wars series, located next to Star Tours – The Adventures Continue in the Echo Lake area at Disney's Hollywood Studios, at the Tomorrowland Terrace in Disneyland, inside Videopolis in Discoveryland at Disneyland Park Paris and at the original UFO Zone area in Hong Kong Disneyland.

The original version, Jedi Training Academy, closed at Walt Disney World on October 5, 2015, and reopened as Jedi Training: Trials of the Temple on December 1, 2015, with new characters from Star Wars Rebels. The Disneyland version closed November 15, 2015, and reopened as Jedi Training: Trials of the Temple on December 8, 2015. The premiere at Hong Kong Disneyland opened on June 25, 2016, as part of its 10th anniversary celebration.

== Jedi Training Academy ==
In the original version, sixteen or more children sign up for each session at the beginning of the day to be Jedi Younglings and participate in a training session by the Jedi Master. They are provided training lightsabers and Jedi robes. As the master completes the instruction of a simple combination of lightsaber attacks to the children, Darth Vader, Darth Maul and two stormtroopers appear. Each Jedi trainee can choose face off with either Maul or Vader until everyone has got to fight a villain, which is when the villains retreat back to the stage, outnumbered (the trainees on the stage fought Vader, while those on the ground fought Maul).

After Vader and Maul leave through a door on stage (in Disneyland, the stage raises and lowers Maul and Vader instead of them going through a door), the stormtroopers try to flee as well, but the door is closed because Vader and Maul left a little before they tried to flee, and the master uses the Force to open the door to let the stormtroopers leave. The children, now Padawans, are congratulated on their mastering of the Force by Yoda, then return the training lightsabers and robe, and are given a diploma for their participation.

== Jedi Training: Trials of the Temple ==
In Jedi Training: Trials of the Temple, the group again goes through the training with the Jedi master (Vanzell Mar-Klar) and a Jedi Apprentice (Nedriss Narr). Then, the group uses the force to open the doors to the Temple. Darth Vader comes out, followed by The Seventh Sister. Each trainee on the upper platform fights Vader, while each trainee on the lower platform fights The Seventh Sister from Star Wars Rebels. After each trainee has faced off with a villain, Vader and The Seventh Sister turn to leave. Right before they would go through the doors, they turn around to seemingly fight again. The Jedi master then leads the trainees in using the Force to push The Seventh Sister and Vader back into the Temple.

Darth Maul then comes out of the Temple and begins a fight with the Jedi Apprentice. Yoda then speaks to the Apprentice, who had previously been trying to stay out of the fight. The Apprentice then battles and defeats Maul. Right before killing Maul, the trainees tell the Apprentice to stop. The Apprentice lets Maul live, and Maul goes back into the Temple. Maul comes back out and the trainees once again use the Force and push Maul back into the Temple. Trainees then return the training lightsabers and robe, and are given a diploma for their participation.

On February 21, 2016, Kylo Ren replaced Darth Maul at Disney's Hollywood Studios. At Disneyland, Kylo Ren made his first appearance in the show, replacing Darth Maul, on March 5, 2016. On September 17, 2017, Kylo Ren replaced The Seventh Sister in both parks.

== Star Wars Weekends ==
Jedi Training Academy originally was a part of Star Wars Weekends and only took place during it.

== Other locations ==
- Jedi Training Academy has been offered at the Star Wars Celebration convention, as well as the D23 Expo.
- From April 23 to 27, 2014, Jedi Training Academy took place at Istinye Park shopping mall in Istanbul, Turkey, under the name Jedi Padawan Academy. In this version, Darth Vader, Stormtrooper and Boba Fett only appeared as photo-op characters.
- From July 4 to 19, 2015, Jedi Training Academy took place at Hong Kong's iconic Times Square as Jedi Academy (Cantonese: 武士學堂).
- From August 6 to 20, 2016, Jedi Training Academy took place at Japan's Fukuoka Prefecture, Tokyo and Osaka Prefecture as Jedi Academy (Japanese: ジェダイ・アカデミー).

== Gallery ==
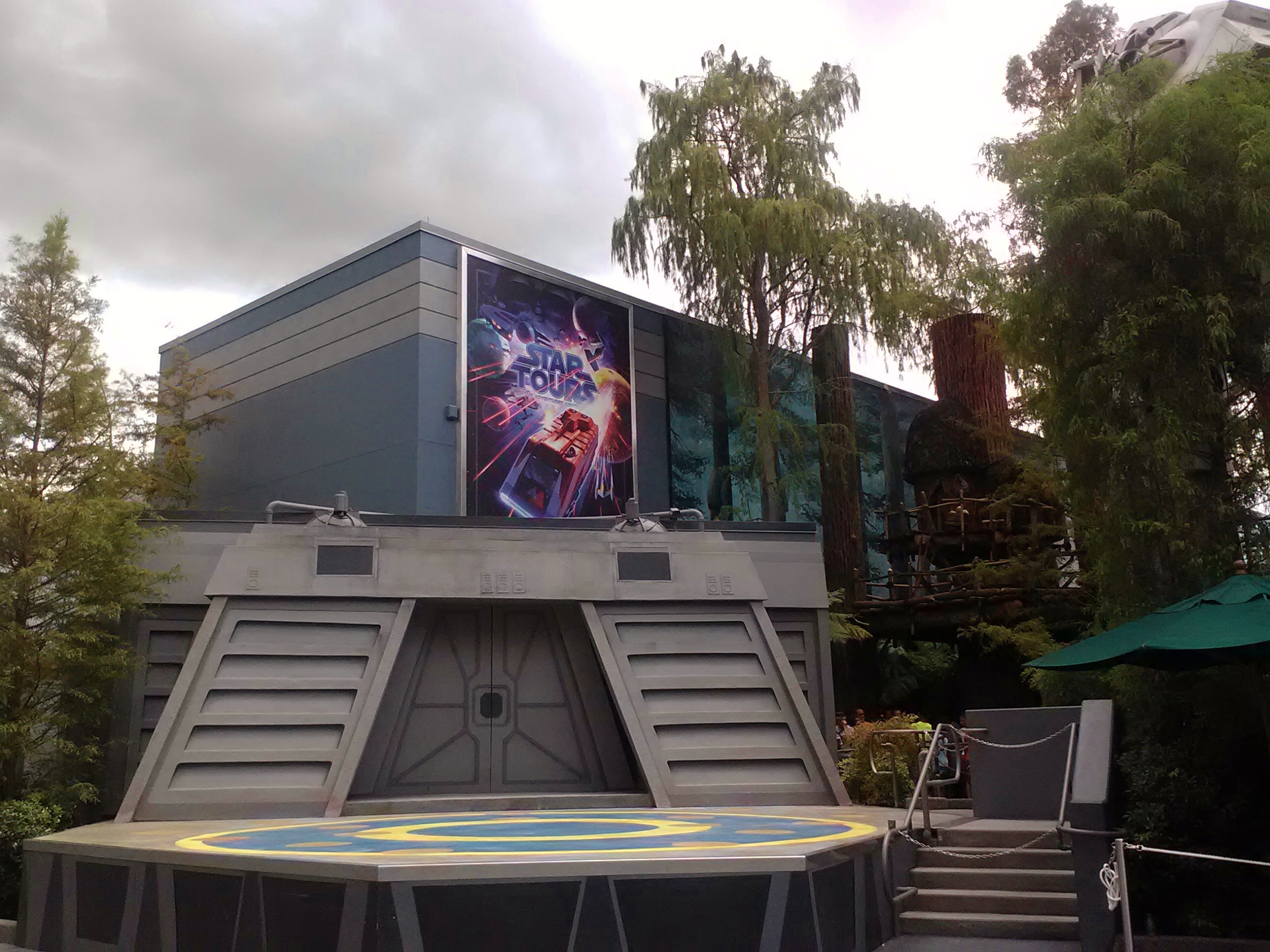
Old Rebels Stage at the Jedi Training Academy at Disney's Hollywood Studios

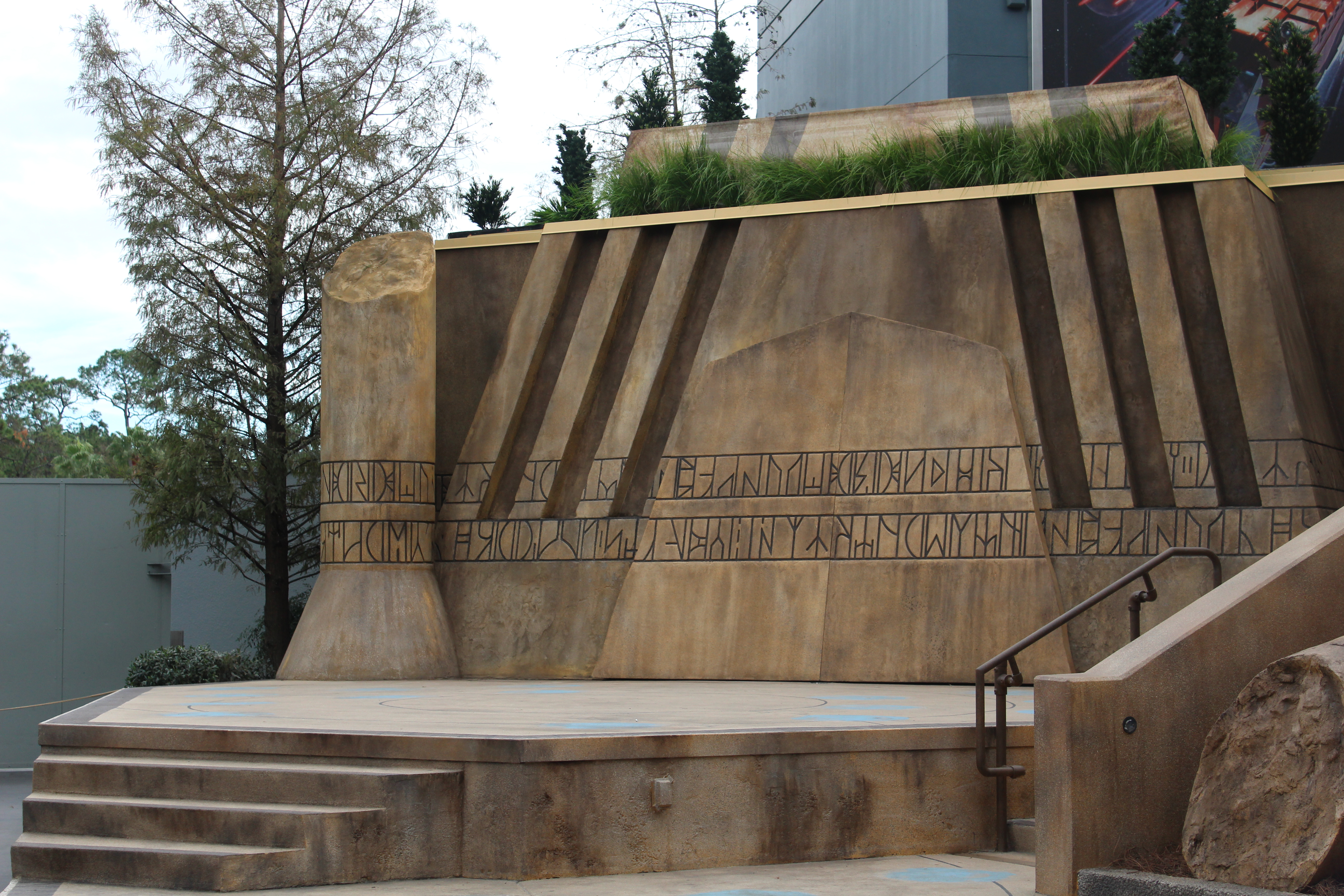
Jedi Temple Stage at Disney's Hollywood Studios

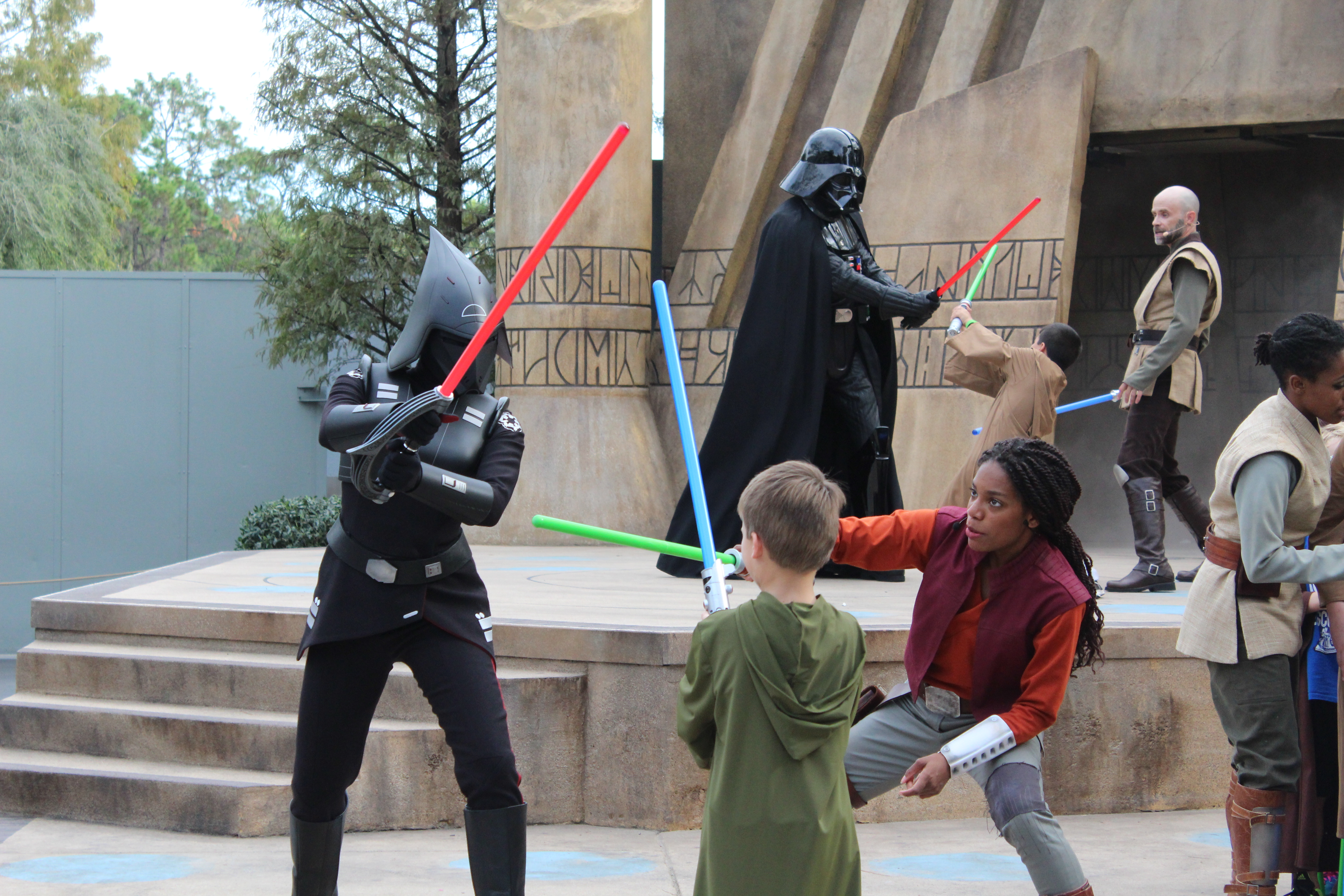
The Seventh Sister and Darth Vader dueling young padawans in Trials of the Temple

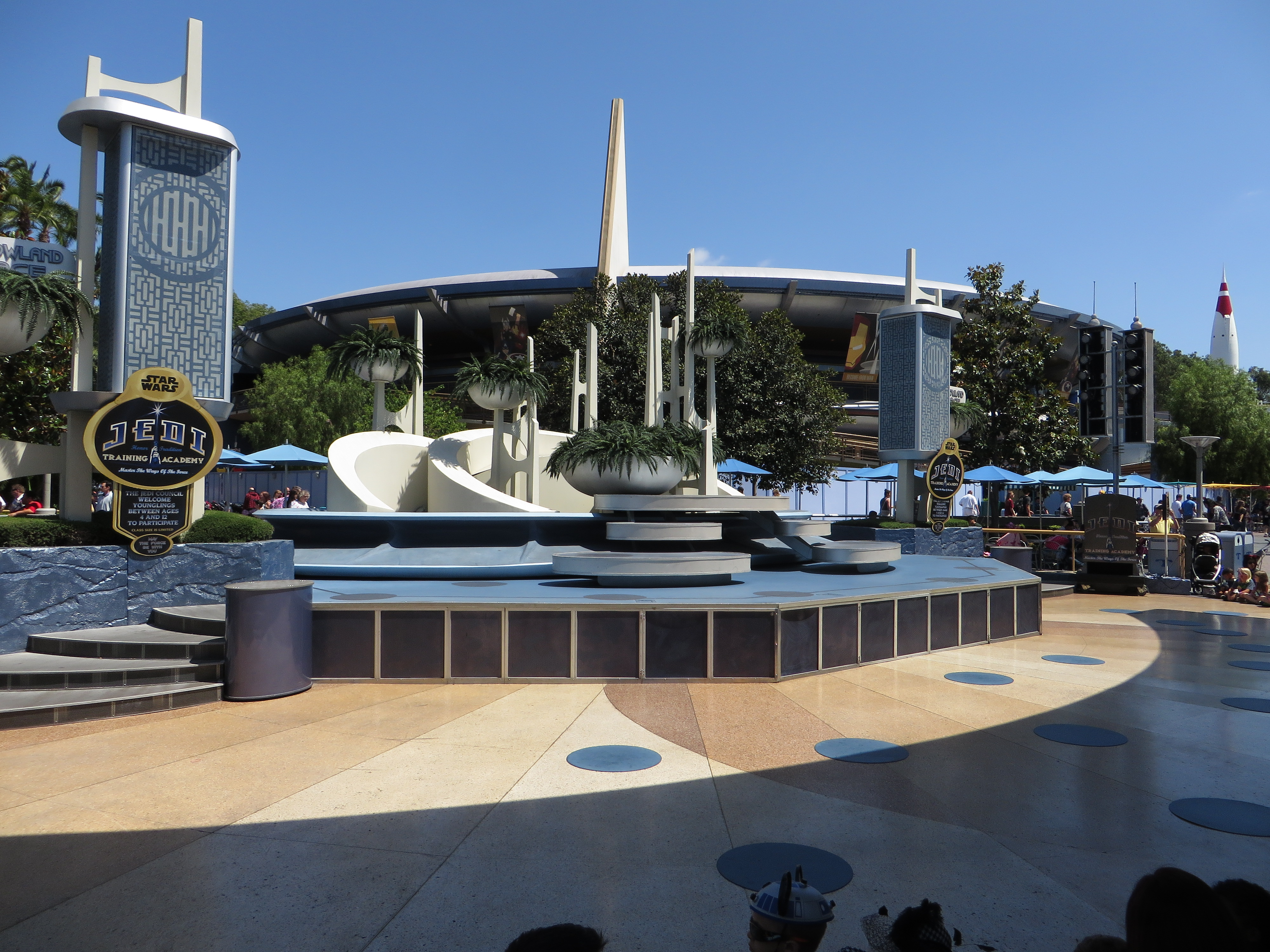
Tomorrowland Terrace at Disneyland, where Jedi Training is staged
