= The Bolts =

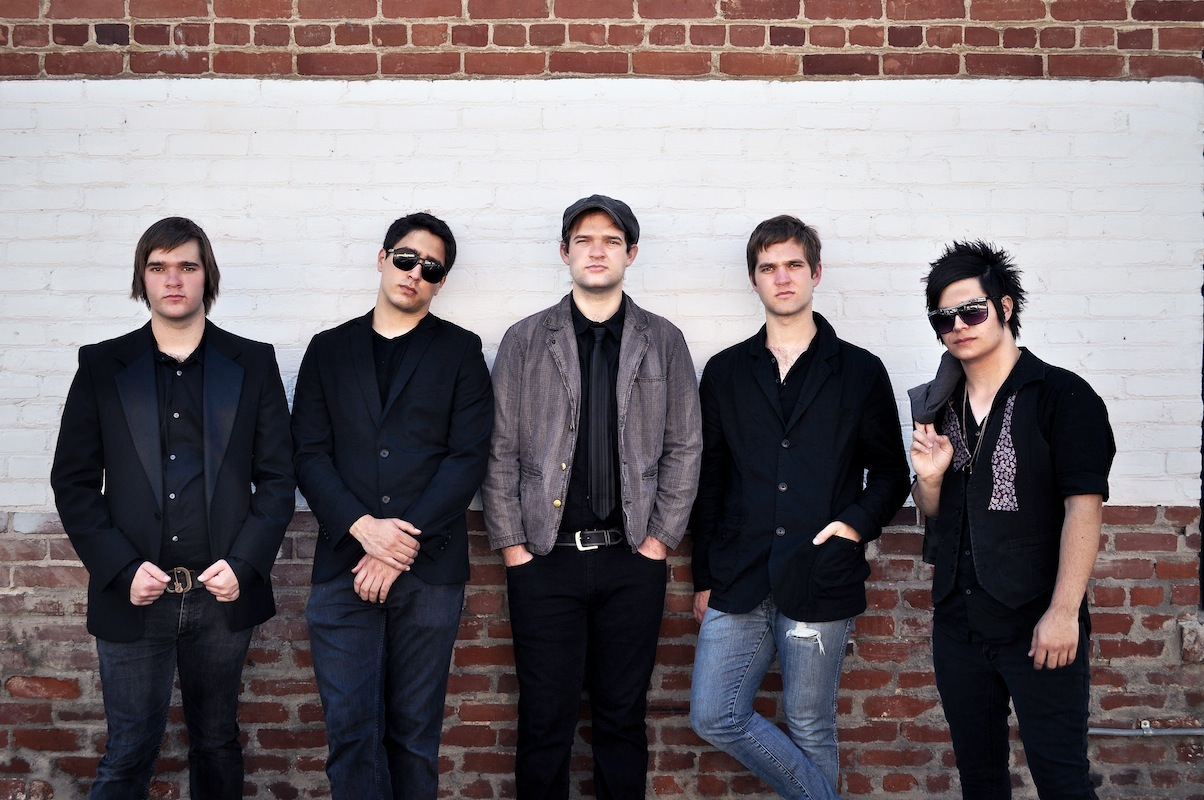
- Southern California modern rock band, The Bolts.

Background information
- Origin: Irvine, California, U.S.
- Genres: Rock
- Years active: 2007 – present
- Members: Matt Champagne; Addam Farmer; Ryan Kilpatrick; Austin Farmer; Heath Farmer
- Website: http://www.theboltsmusic.com

The Bolts are an independent modern rock band from Irvine, California. Formed in 2007, the band consists of guitarist Heath Farmer, bassist Addam Farmer, keyboardist Austin Farmer, guitarist Ryan Kilpatrick, and drummer Matt Champagne. The entire frontline of the band sings lead vocals with multiple harmonies.

The Bolts first experienced local success in 2007 when the band landed five demo songs on the local rock radio station, KROQ, after being together less than four months. Soon after, the band started winning local battles of the bands and other competitions, eventually leading them to earn the title of Orange County's ‘Best Pop Artist’ from the OC Music Awards.

In 2011, the band provided the soundtrack to an ad campaign for SoBe soft drinks, featuring Sports Illustrated cover supermodel, Kate Upton.

The Bolts released their debut EP entitled ‘Fall’ in September 2012, followed by a full-length album ‘Wait 'til We're Young, in February, 2013.
