= Lightning bolt =

Lightning bolt often refers to:

- Lightning, an electric discharge in the atmosphere or between the atmosphere and the ground
- Thunderbolt, a symbolic representation of lightning accompanied by a loud thunderclap

Lightning bolt may also refer to:

== Music ==
- Lightning Bolt (band), an American noise rock duo
- Lightning Bolt Tour, to promote the Pearl Jam album Lightning Bolt

=== Albums and songs ===
- Lightning Bolt (Lightning Bolt album)
- Lightning Bolt (Pearl Jam album)
- "Lightning Bolt" (song), by Jake Bugg

== Other uses ==
- Lightning Bolt (film), an Italian-Spanish spy movie
- Lightning Bolt (interface), a computer display and docking standard
- Lightning Bolt (motorcycle), an American world land-speed record breaker
- Lightning Bolt, nickname and victory pose of Jamaican sprinter Usain Bolt

== See also ==
- Bolt (disambiguation)
- Bolt of lightning (disambiguation)
- Lightning (disambiguation)
- Thunderbolt (disambiguation)
