= Ego Likeness =

American band

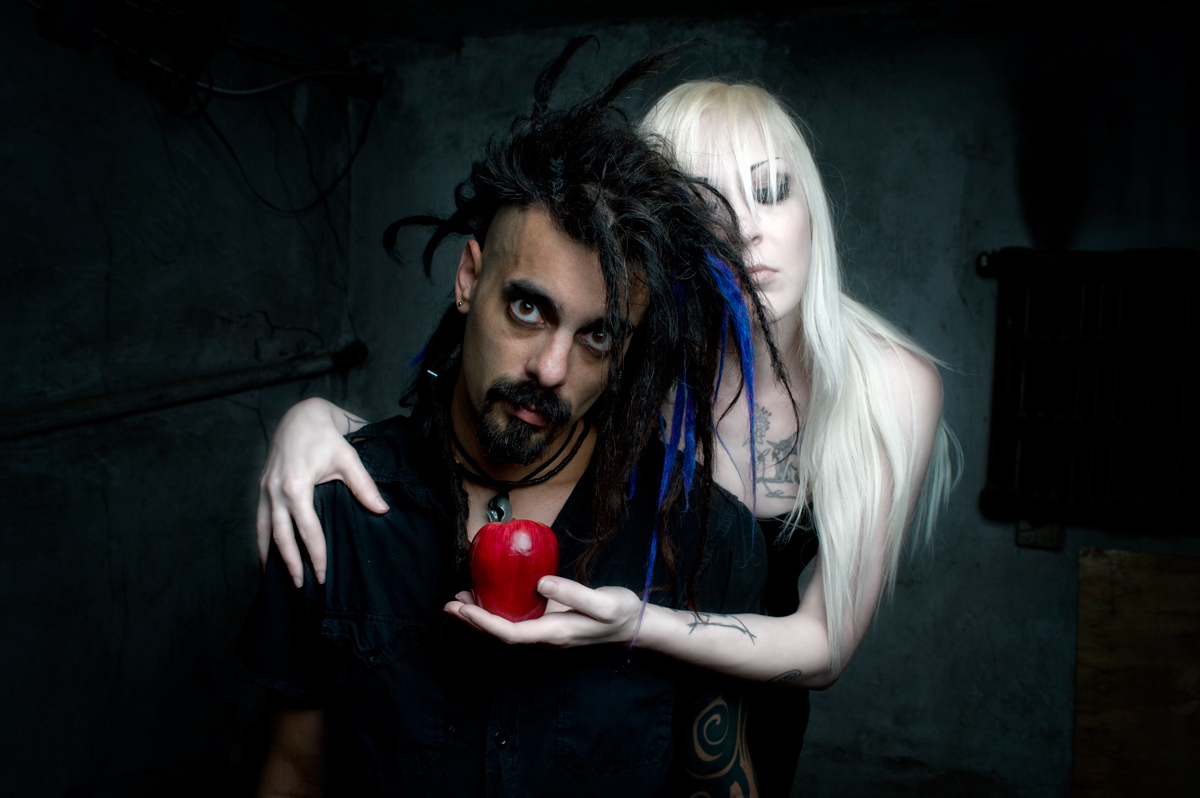
- Ego Likeness pose for their album Breedless

Background information
- Origin: Baltimore, Maryland, United States
- Genre: darkwave
- Years active: 1999–present
- Labels: Metropolis; Dancing_Ferret_Discs
- Spinoffs: Hopeful Machines; Stoneburner; The Trinity Project
- Members: Steven Archer; Donna Lynch; Mindcage Rick; Mike K. Johnson
- Past members: Justin "Dingo" Sabe; Adam Goode; Tim McCracken; Dave O'Donnell; Jenny Mettee; Stephanie Kim; Jerome Lintz; Nick "Konchog Nyima" vonZoll; Dan Mullen; Amanda Mason; Shaun Mason; Magpie Killjoy

Ego Likeness is an American darkwave band from Baltimore, Maryland. They were formed in 1999 by artist Steven Archer and writer Donna Lynch.

== History ==
=== Early work ===
Ego Likeness began as an experimental and dark trip hop project. A demo called Songs from a Dead City, recorded on a four-track and self-produced by Archer and Lynch, was released in 1999.

In 2000, Archer and Lynch took the project in a darker electronic and dance direction, resulting in a self-released full-length album entitled Dragonfly under EL's own label, Angelfall.

=== Dancing Ferret Records ===
After a short hiatus from recording, a lengthy period of trial, error, revision, and many live performances, Ego Likeness signed with Dancing Ferret Discs for the 2004 release of Water to the Dead. This album featured the band’s electronic roots while exploring a bit of a heavier rock sound.

In 2005, Ego Likeness toured Germany, Luxembourg, and the continental US with Dancing Ferret label mates The Crüxshadows, as well as performing at several festivals on the east and west coast, including Convergence 11 (San Diego CA), Dracula’s Ball (Philadelphia PA), Blacksun Festival I (New Haven CT), Freaks United (DC), Eccentrik Festival I (Raleigh NC), Dragon Con (Atlanta GA), Ring Con (Fulda, Germany) and others.

Their first album, Dragonfly, was also re-released on Dancing Ferret Discs in 2005.

In 2006, Ego Likeness released their third full-length album, The Order of the Reptile, which ventured back into the realms of heavy electronica, a bit of trip hop, some goth rock, and darkwave.

2006 also saw the release of Where's Neil When You Need Him?, a tribute to writer Neil Gaiman, featuring the song "You Better Leave the Stars Alone", written for the book Stardust. The band toured Germany once again and the US with The Crüxshadows and Ayria throughout the winter of 2006 to 2007.

In 2007, Ego Likeness toured Germany, Poland and the UK with Ayria and Angelspit. They have also often performed at sci-fi/fantasy convention Dragon Con, where they are semi-regular guests along with a number of other dark alternative bands.

Ego Likeness also performs regularly at Wicked Faire in Somerset, New Jersey.

=== The Compass EPs ===
In 2007, Ego Likeness began self-releasing the first of four EPs, collectively titled The Compass. The first, South, featured new songs and old remixes.

2008 brought about the second of the Compass EPs, West, as well as their single, "The Lowest Place on Earth". This was supported by a US tour throughout late winter and spring.

In 2009, the North EP is released, featuring duet with The Dark Clan and a cover of PJ Harvey's "Down by the Water." Ego Likeness also embarked on a tour as a supporting act for Combichrist and Julien-K.

In 2012, the final EP in the Compass series, East, was released. The EP contained two original tracks, a cover of The Police's "Tea in the Sahara", and seven remixes from various artists including Angelspit and Komor Kommando.

=== Metropolis Records ===
==== 2010s ====
Ego Likeness were signed to Metropolis Records and released their fourth album, Breedless, on April 13, 2010. The album received critical acclaim from music magazines ReGen and Reflections of Darkness.

Ego Likeness has also contributed to multiple volumes of the cancer-benefit compilations, Electronic Saviors.

On August 14, 2012, the first single, "Treacherous Things" for the upcoming album "When the Wolves Return" was released along with a music video for the song directed by Kyle Cassidy.

On October 29, 2013, the group announced on their official Facebook page a Winter 2013 US headlining tour with support from Servitior.

In 2015, "When The Wolves Return" full-length album was released, along with a single featuring a dozen remixes of the album track "New Legion."

After a brief period of inactivity (in deference to other projects) the duo released the Wolves EP in 2020 and a single covering Madonna's track, "Live to Tell," in 2023.

=== Additional background ===
Ego Likeness have also shared the stage with Voltaire, The Damned, Chris Connelly, Collide, Razed in Black, Bella Morte, Das Ich, Rasputina, The Start, Iris, Decoded Feedback, The Azoic, More Machine Than Man, In Strict Confidence, Combichrist, New Model Army, Attrition, The Last Dance, Peter Murphy, and many others.

== Other projects ==
=== Writing ===
Lynch wrote a dark fiction novel entitled Isabel Burning, released through Raw Dog Screaming Press in 2008. The plot deals with incest and selective breeding, and is heavily influenced by works such as Daphne Du Maurier's Rebecca. Lynch also released two collections of poetry, In My Mouth (2000), and Ladies and Other Vicious Creatures (RDSP, 2007). A novella called Driving Through the Desert was released on Thunderstorm Books in April 2012. Lynch published several more poetry collections including Witches (2018), Choking Back the Devil (2019), and Girls from the County (2022), each of which were nominated for Bran Stoker Awards.

Archer has released a children's book entitled Luna Maris and a steampunk fable chapbook titled Red King Black Rook in 2008. He is an accomplished visual artist whose collage-based work has appeared in numerous galleries and in Weird Tales magazine. In 2021, Archer was nominated and became a finalist for a Bram Stoker Award for his graphic novel adaptation of Edgar Allan Poe's Masque of the Red Death.

Archer is also the author of Red in Tooth and Claw, an art book. Red in Tooth and Claw tells the origin story of his character the World Wolf, the protagonist of his concept EP of the same name released under the Stoneburner moniker.

=== Hopeful Machines ===
Archer is also the creator of the electronic/ noise project Hopeful Machines which was signed to Washington, DC–based label Radio-Active-Music in late 2008. Hopeful Machines' first hard copy album, ::Skinless::, was released in December 2008.

=== Stoneburner ===
Steven Archer is also the creator of the solo project Stoneburner, which incorporates elements of experimental noise, industrial rock, ethereal, trip hop, and worldbeat. Stoneburner's output explores themes of neurodiversity as well as social issues such as abortion rights and anti-racism, and has included homages to media such as Donna Tartt's The Secret History and Peter Watts' Blindsight.

Archer gradually revised Stoneburner to revolve around the concept of a character he created called the World Wolf,, a Kaiju whose loss of his love, the similarly semi-divine wolf Cyan, leads him to cause damage to human environments and societies. Steven Archer has suggested that his development of the concept was inspired by his anger at human destructiveness, which he saw occur in the form of the Covid-19-era antivaxxer movement.

=== The Trinity Project ===
Archer and Lynch are also the creators of the experimental/instrumental/spoken word outfit The Trinity Project.

== Personal lives ==
Steven Archer and Donna Lynch have both raised hairless sphynx cats. In addition, they are both ordained ministers of the Universal Life Church.

Lynch has also been open about her struggles with mood disorders, fibromyalgia, and Lyme disease.

Archer holds a Bachelor's degree from the Corcoran School of the Arts and Design at the George Washington University. He is openly on the autism spectrum, and has advocated for increased public understanding of both the creative potential of autistic individuals and the stigma autistic individuals face.

== Members ==
=== Current ===
- Steven Archer – guitars, programming
- Donna Lynch – vocals, piano
- "Mindcage" Rick Furr – live guitars
- Mike K. Johnson – live drums

=== Past ===
- Justin "Dingo" Sabe – keytar, keyboards, noise
- Adam Goode – bass
- Tim McCracken – keyboards
- Dave O'Donnell – drums
- Jenny Mettee – guitars, cello
- Stephanie Kim – violin
- Jerome Lintz – drums
- Nick "Konchog Nyima" vonZoll – drums
- Dan Mullin – guitars
- Amanda Mason – keyboards, backing vocals
- Shaun Mason – guitars
- Magpie Killjoy – drums

== Discography ==
=== Studio albums ===
Year	Title	Label
1999	Songs from a Dead City	Demo
2000	Dragonfly	Angelfall Music
2004	Water to the Dead	Noir Records
2006	The Order of the Reptile	Dancing Ferrett
2010	Breedless	Metropolis
2015	When the Wolves Return	Metropolis
2016	The Compass EPs	Metropolis
2018	Songs From A Dead City	Metropolis

=== EPs ===
- South, 2007
- West, 2008
- North, 2009
- East, 2012
- Compass, 2016
- Wolves, 2020

=== Singles ===
- "The Lowest Place on Earth" 2008
- "Treacherous Thing" 2012
- "New Legion" 2015
- "Live to Tell" 2023

== Remixes by Ego Likeness ==
- "When I Cared" – The Perfects on the rerelease of the album Future Automatic
- "Cassandra" – The Crüxshadows on the album Fortress in Flames
- "Terribly When" – The Last Dance on the album Reflections of Rage
- "Tarnished" – Black Tape for a Blue Girl on the single "The Scarecrow"
- "Inside of You, In Spite of You (Ti Bon Ange Mix)" – ThouShaltNot on the single "The Projectionist"
- "Vena Cava"- Angelspit on the CD Krankhaus
- "Demon"- Hypofixx on the album After December
- "Mantra (Shades of Grey version)"- The Machine in the Garden on the album XV

== Guest appearances ==
- "Little Drummer Boy" – With Nicki Jaine on the CD Projekt Records' Holiday Single 1
- Then and Again – Voltaire
- "The NeverEnding Story" – The Dark Clan on the Goths on a Boat EP.
- "Princess Chaos" – Angelspit on "Hideous and Perfect"
- "The World Below" – Aioboforcen on Dedale
- Raised By Bats – Voltaire

== Compilation appearances ==
- Asleep By Dawn Magazine Presents: DJ Ferret's Underground Club Mix #1
- The Best of Radio Free Abattoir
- Dancing In The Dark: 10 Years Of Dancing Ferret
- Dancing In The Dark: 2006
- Where's Neil When You Need Him? 2006
- Electronic Saviors: Industrial Music To Cure Cancer
- Electronic Saviors: Industrial Music to Cure Cancer Vol. 2
- "Gothic Spirits 12"
