= Jenny Mettee =

American multi-instrumentalist

- Other names: Jenny Rae Mettee, Gashius Clay, Jenny Goodenough

Jenny Mettee is an American multi-instrumentalist.

== Early life ==
Mettee was born in Towson, Maryland at St. Joseph's hospital. She grew up in Lutherville, a few streets away from John Waters childhood home. Raised by her mother and maternal grandparents. Her grandfather was an amateur weightlifter and hobbyist folk and country musician. At age 12, she took cello lessons with Peabody graduate Vicky Perkins and taught herself guitar.

In 2001 she attended Sheffield Institute for the Recording Arts and was taught audio engineering and production by Drew Mazurek and Crack The Sky's Glenn Workman.

== Professional life ==
=== Ego Likeness ===
At age 20, she found out her classmate at Sheffield Institute had joined Baltimore dark wave band Ego Likeness. At the time, Ego's practice space was in the basement of Angelfall Studios, now used as the headquarters for Charm City Cakes and the filming location for the Food Network show "Ace of Cakes". After an invitation was extended to attend a rehearsal, Steven Archer said Ego Likeness had a need for a bassist. In late 2001 she joined Ego Likeness' as its 9th member alongside Steven and Donna, a live drummer, lead guitarist, violin player, theremin player and two backup vocalists. Throughout 2001 and into 2003, she played with Ego Likeness on East Coast tour dates prior to the 2004 release "Water to the Dead" album, later re-released in 2013 on Metropolis Records. In 2003, she turned 21 playing a cello solo of "Aurora" from Ego Likeness' "Dragonfly" album at CBGB's "CB's 313 Gallery". She is thanked in the "Live Contributions" section of the liner notes for "Water to the Dead".

=== VAST ===
After responding to a post on the VAST message board for a cello player in 2003 and speaking with Jon Crosby online, she went to New York to record parts for the online release of "Turquoise and Crimson". She provides backup vocals and cello for "Where it Never Rains" and a cello intro on "I Need to Say Goodbye". Recording time was cut short as her trip to NYC coincided with the Northeast blackout of 2003.

=== Nahja Mora ===
In the summer of 2016, she joined Baltimore industrial group Nahja Mora as their live bassist. In November 2016 her first show with Nahja Mora was opening up for the Revolting Cocks, playing on that tour as "The Cocks", minus Al Jourgensen. She contributed cello, synth and electric bass to the 2017 release "The Trees See More", which received international attention from industrial music blogs Brutal Resonance and Regen Magazine. Nahja Mora has caught the attention of the industrial scene with remixes from I, Parasite and Shawn Brice of Battery.

=== Fun Never Starts ===
After a taking a hiatus from writing music, in 2011 she self-released "Welcome to Baltimore" through TuneCore streaming services and continued writing solo works. In winter of 2014, she began performing as Fun Never Starts, a blend of industrial, synth punk, and performance art. While finishing up songs for the first Fun Never Starts release, she created a music video for "The Accident". This video was submitted to Noisey Magazine and received a brief review.

Prior to the release of the first FNS album, she produced and animated Santigold's husband Trevor Andrew a.k.a. Trouble Andrew's "I Think I Know You" video which premiered in 2015 through Elevator Music Magazine. Additionally, Trouble Andrew played one of his only live shows in 2015 at Baltimore venue "The Crown" which featured a 9 band bill in one evening. Fun Never Starts and a special guest appearance by Spank Rock.

After self-releasing "United States of Akrasia" on cassette and bandcamp in 2016, she went through temporary musical lineups for her live shows. In early 2017 two new permanent members, Slim Dickens and Peanu Reeves joined, she rebranded Fun Never Starts and created on a new logo with Julian Luskin. The first show with the addition of Fun Never Start's new members, reunited Jenny with Ego Likeness on the bill. She produced and mixed Fun Never Starts October 2017 release "Nothing's Good Ever", which received reviews from goth industrial blogs in the US and Russia. The band is currently working on a new album.
