= East (EP) =

- Cover photo by Kyle Cassidy

EP by Ego Likeness
- Released: July 3, 2012
- Genre: Darkwave, Industrial
- Length: 40:57
- Label: Self-released (CDEP)
- Producer: Ego Likeness and Dan Clark

Ego Likeness chronology
North (2009)	East (2012)	When the Wolves Return (2015)

Professional ratings
Review scores
Source	Rating
Grave Concerns Ezine	(favorable)
Brutal Resonance	6/10 stars

East is the fourth EP by darkwave band Ego Likeness. It was the final Compass EP to be released, marking the end of the series. The EP had a limited pressing of 300 copies and was independently released on July 3, 2012, through the band's official website.

== Track listing ==
No.	Title	Length
1.	"–geist"	4:24
2.	"Persona Non Grata"	4:58
3.	"Tea in the Sahara" (The Police cover)	3:52
4.	"The Devil's in the Chemicals" (Sin mix by Angelspit)	4:27
5.	"Inferno" (Hotter than Hell remix by Komor Kommando)	5:06
6.	"I’m not Maryanne" (Mokmi remix by The Dark Clan)	6:28
7.	"Severine" (Floodland remix by ThouShaltNot)	3:25
8.	"The Devil's in the Chemicals" (remix by Terrorfakt)	4:59
9.	"Inferno" (Donna the Dead remix by Bella Morte)	4:48
10.	"Severine" (RB mix by Rick Burnett)	4:30
Total length:		40:57

== Personnel ==
- Donna Lynch – vocals, lyrics, piano, synths
- Steven Archer – guitar, vocals, synths, drums, programming
