= Where's Neil When You Need Him? =

2006 compilation album by various artists

Compilation album by various
- Released: July 18, 2006
- Label: Dancing Ferret

Where's Neil When You Need Him? is a tribute album based on the works of fantasy writer Neil Gaiman.

== Overview ==
The album was released on Dancing Ferret Discs on 18 July 2006. The CD has cover art by Dave McKean and extensive new liner notes from Neil Gaiman and Patrick Rodgers.

The album's title was taken from the song "Space Dog", by Tori Amos. Amos became a long-time friend and collaborator of Neil Gaiman after she made a reference to him in the 1991 song "Tear in Your Hand". She had also made references to Gaiman and his work in her songs "Horses", "Hotel", "Carbon", "Not Dying Today", and "Sister Named Desire". "Sister Named Desire" is the only work on this album that had previously appeared elsewhere. The song was originally released as a B-side to Amos' track "Talula". It was remastered specifically for this release at the same time that other Amos tracks were being cleaned up for her compilation Tales of a Librarian.

== Track listing ==
1. Rasputina – "Coraline" (Coraline)
2. ThouShaltNot – "When Everyone Forgets" (American Gods)
3. Tapping the Vein – "Trader Boy" (The Day I Swapped My Dad for Two Goldfish)
4. Lunascape – "Raven Star" (Stardust)
5. Deine Lakaien – "A Fish Called Prince" ("The Goldfish Pool")
6. Thea Gilmore – "Even Gods Do" (American Gods)
7. Rose Berlin featuring Curve – "Coraline" (Coraline)
8. Schandmaul – "Magda Treadgolds Märchen" (The Sandman)
9. Hungry Lucy – "We Won't Go" (The Wolves in the Walls)
10. Voltaire – "Come Sweet Death" (Death of the Endless)
11. Future Bible Heroes – "Mr. Punch" (Mr. Punch)
12. Razed in Black – "The Endless" (The Endless from The Sandman)
13. The Crüxshadows – "Wake the White Queen" (MirrorMask)
14. Ego Likeness – "You Better Leave the Stars Alone" (Stardust)
15. Azam Ali – "The Cold Black Key" (Coraline)
16. Joachim Witt – "Vandemar" (Neverwhere)
17. Tori Amos – "Sister Named Desire (New Master)" (The Sandman)
