= Me and You (VAST album) =

Studio album by VAST
- Released: May 26, 2009
- Studio: 5th Street Studios, Austin, Texas
- Genre: Alternative rock
- Length: 43:35
- Label: 2blossoms
- Producer: Jon Crosby

VAST chronology
April (Retail Version) (2007)	Me and You (2009)	Making Evening and Night (2014)

Professional ratings
Review scores
Source	Rating
The Tune	(D+)

Me and You is the sixth studio album by the band VAST. It compiles songs from Crosby's Generica series and models them in a more electronic, full band approach. Me and You was released to retail May 26, 2009 on Crosby's independent label, 2blossoms. When the album was purchased from the official VAST website, buyers had the option of choosing a charity to which to donate part of the sale proceeds.

== Track listing ==
All songs written by Jon Crosby.

1. "You Should Have Known I'd Leave" – 3:01
2. "I Thought By Now" – 3:49
3. "Here's to All the People I Have Lost" – 4:22
4. "Until I Die" – 2:59
5. "I'm Afraid of You" – 3:25
6. "You're the Same" – 5:05
7. "Everything Has Changed" – 2:35
8. "You Destroy Me" – 3:51
9. "You Are the One" – 3:11
10. "Hotel Song" – 3:25
11. "It's Not You (It's Me)" – 4:06
12. "She Found Out" – 3:46
