= Live at CBGB's (VAST album) =

Live album by VAST
- Released: 2006
- Genre: Alternative rock
- Length: 56:18
- Label: 2blossoms

VAST chronology
April (Online Version) (2006)	Live at CBGB's (2006)	Seattle 2007 (2007)

Live at CBGB's is an official live recording by the band VAST and was released in 2006. It was made available as an online download.

== Track listing ==
1. "Intro" – 1:45
2. "Turquoise" – 3:19
3. "Here" – 3:52
4. "Pretty When You Cry" – 3:50
5. "Falling from the Sky" – 3:14
6. "Thrown Away" – 4:01
7. "Touched" – 4:24
8. "I Don't Have Anything" – 3:21
9. "I Can't Say No (To You)" – 3:48
10. "That's My Boy" – 4:06
11. "The Last One Alive" – 3:57
12. "Free" – 3:15
13. "Desert Garden" – 3:26
14. "Tattoo of Your Name" – 3:31
15. "You're Too Young" – 3:02
16. "Temptation" – 3:27
