= List of songs recorded by De/Vision =

The following is a list of released songs recorded and performed by De/Vision. This list contains all tracks released on studio albums, singles and EPs. It excludes remixes on singles, the Remixed album (2001) and live albums. The length given usually are the lengths of the album versions.

Contents:	Top - 0-9 A B C D E F G H I J K L M N O P Q R S T U W Y X Z

== 0–9 ==
- "6 Feet Underground" - 6:21 (6 Feet Underground, 2004)

== A ==
- "A New Dawn" - 5:57 (Devolution, 2003)
- "A Prayer" - 4:58 (Void, 1999)
- "A World in Season" - 4:24 (Antiquity - Unreleased Tracks 1990-92, 1995)
- "Addict" - 4:53 (Subkutan, 2006)
- "Aimee" - 4:42 (6 Feet Underground, 2004)
- "All I Ever Do" - 5:52 (Two, 2001)
- "Anywhere" - 7:18 (Void, 1999)
- "At Night" - 5:00 (Universed in Love, 1996)

== B ==
- "Back in My Life" - 4:21 (Monosex, 1998)
- "Be a Light to Yourself" - 4:27 (Popgefahr, 2010)
- "Beside You" - 4:49 (6 Feet Underground, 2004)
- "Bleed Me White" - 4:28 (Fairyland?, 1996)
- "Blindness" - 4:37 (Two, 2001)
- "Blue Moon" - 3:29 (Universed in Love, 1996)
- "Blue Moon" _{(Limited)} - 4:38 (Universed in Love (Limited Edition), 1996)
- "Blue Moon" _{(Void-Style)} - 4:10 (Void, 1999)
- "Boy on the Street" _{(Disjointed-Mix)} - 4:10 (EP Boy on the Street, 1995)
- "Boy on the Street" _{(Hello-High-Mix)} - 7:27 (EP Boy on the Street, 1995)
- "Breathless" (Best Of..., 2006)

== C ==
- "Can You Feel the Drive" - 4:20 (Single Try to Forget, 1993)
- "Circulate" - 4:26 (Antiquity - Unreleased Tracks 1990-92, 1995)
- "Crystallized" - 3:46 (Single Sweet Life, 1996)

== D ==
- "Dawn" - 1:12 (Fairyland?, 1996)
- "Daydreamin'" - 3:25 (Fairyland?, 1996)
- "Death of Me" - 4:04 (Noob, 2007)
- "Deep Blue" - 4:3 (Noob, 2007)
- "Deliver Me" - 3:25 (Monosex, 1998)
- "Desertland" - 4:41 (Antiquity - Unreleased Tracks 1990-92, 1995)
- "Digital Dream" - 3:50 (Devolution, 2003)
- "Dinner without Grace" - 3:56 (World Without End, 1993)
- "Drifter" - 4:05 (Monosex, 1998)
- "Dress Me When I Bleed" - 4:36 (Universed in Love, 1996)
- "Drifting Sideways" - 4:27 (Devolution, 2003)
- "Drive" - 2:32 (Universed in Love (Limited Edition), 1996)
- "Drowning Soul" - 5:09 (Two, 2001)

== E ==
- "E-Shock" - 5:54 (Subkutan, 2006)
- "Easy to Love Me" - 3:32 (free download at depechemode.de, 2010)
- "Endlose Träume" - 4:20 (Single Blue Moon, 1996)
- "Escape the World" - 4:32 (Two, 2001)

== F ==
- "Falling" - 3:57 (World Without End, 1993)
- "Far to Deep" - 5:15 (Devolution, 2003)
- "Flash of Life" - 4:25 (Popgefahr, 2010)
- "Flavour of the Week" - 3:51 (Noob, 2007)
- "Foreigner" - 5:15 (Void, 1999)
- "Free From Cares" - 5:20 (Universed in Love, 1996)
- "Free World" - 5:45 (Popgefahr (iTunes Bonustrack), 2010)
- "Freedom" - 5:43 (Void, 1999)

== G ==
- "Get over the Wall" - 3:55 (Single Dress Me When I Bleed, 1995)
- "Ghosttrain" - 3:57 (Single We Fly... Tonight, 1998)
- "Give In" - 4:27 (Void, 1999)
- "Green-Eyed Monster" - 3:30 (Single We Fly... Tonight, 1998)
- "God Is Blind" - 4:17 (Monosex, 1998)

== H ==
- "Harvester" - 5:02 (Fairyland?, 1996)
- "Hear Me Calling" - 4:08 (Monosex, 1998)
- "Heart of Stone" - 4:35 (Monosex, 1998)
- "Heart-Shaped Tumor" - 5:53 (Two, 2001)
- "Heroine" - 4:19 (Two, 2001)
- "Home" - 4:37 (Single Heart-Shaped Tumor, 2001)
- "Hope Won't Die" - 5:35 (Void, 1999)
- "Hunters" - 4:00 (Single Dinner without Grace, 1994)

== I ==
- "I Regret" - 4:44 (Fairyland?, 1996)
- "I'm Not Dreaming of You" - 5:02 (6 Feet Underground, 2004)
- "I'm Not Enough" - 5:05 (6 Feet Underground, 2004)
- "If We Should Ignore This" - 4:07 (Antiquity - Unreleased Tracks 1990-92, 1995)
- "In Dir" - 5:47 (Subkutan, 2006)
- "Into Another World" - 3:44 (Antiquity - Unreleased Tracks 1990-92, 1995)

== K ==
- "Keep Your Dreams Alive" - 3:44 (Fairyland?, 1996)
- "Klangmonaut" - 5:07 (6 Feet Underground, 2004)

== L ==
- "Life Is Suffering" - 4:18 (Noob, 2007)
- "Like a Sea of Flames" - 4:34 (Universed in Love, 1996)
- "Like the Sun" - 4:12 (Fairyland?, 1996)
- "Living Fast Dying Young" - 4:08 (Noob, 2007)
- "Lonely Day" - 5:04 (Two, 2001)
- "Lost in You" - 4:14 (Antiquity - Unreleased Tracks 1990-92, 1995)
- "Love Me Again" - 4:31 (Universed in Love, 1996)
- "Love Will Find a Way" _{(Noob Version)} - 4:27 (Noob, 2007)

== M ==
- "mAndroids" - 3:49 (Popgefahr, 2010)
- "Mary Jane" - 3:52 (Devolution, 2003)
- "Melody of Your Face" - 4:00 (Antiquity - Unreleased Tracks 1990-92, 1995)
- "Miss You More" - 4:20 (Devolution, 2003)
- "Moments We Shared" - 4:27 (Universed in Love, 1996)
- "Moments We Shared" _{(Divided)} - 3:33 (Universed in Love (Limited Edition), 1996)
- "Moonbeam" - 4:18 (Single Foreigner, 2000)
- "My Own Worst Enemy" - 5:57 (Subkutan, 2006)

== N ==
- "Neptune" - 4:31 (Single Heart-Shaped Tumor, 2001)
- "New Drug" - 5:35 (Monosex, 1998)
- "Nine Lives" - 3:49 (Noob, 2007)
- "No Tomorrow" - 6:24 (Subkutan, 2006)
- "Not Made of Gold" - 5:32 (Subkutan, 2006)

== O ==
- "Obey Your Heart" - 4:43 (Subkutan, 2006)
- "Obsolete" - 3:58 (Noob, 2007)

== P ==
- "Perfect Mind" - 4:00 (World Without End, 1993)
- "Plastic Heart" - 4:26 (Popgefahr, 2010)
- "Plight" _{(SOS-Mix)} - 4:10 (EP Boy on the Street, 1995)
- "Pseudo-Fusion" - 3:51 (Single Dress Me When I Bleed, 1995)

== R ==
- "Rage" - 4:00 (Popgefahr, 2010)
- "Re-Invent Yourself" - 5:00 (Void, 1999)
- "Ready to Die" - 4:45 (Popgefahr, 2010)
- "Remember" - 4:21 (Void, 1999)
- "Ride on a Star" - 4:31 (Void, 1999)
- "Right on Time" - 4:55 (6 Feet Underground, 2004)

== S ==
- "Sadness" - 4:52 (Devolution, 2003)
- "Scars" - 3:43 (Fairyland?, 1996)
- "See What I See" - 5:07 (Noob, 2007)
- "Self-Deception" - 7:14 (Void, 1999)
- "Shoreline" - 3:12 (Monosex, 1998)
- "Silent Moan" - 4:28 (Two, 2001)
- "Skip this Page" - 4:16 (Universed in Love, 1996)
- "Slaves to Passion" - 3:28 (Monosex, 1998)
- "Slum Child" - 4:11 (World Without End, 1993)
- "Someone to Draw the Sword" - 3:45 (Single Blue Moon, 1996)
- "Soul for Sale" - 4:08 (Single Strange Affection, 1998)
- "Soul-Keeper" - 4:18 (Universed in Love, 1996)
- "Star-Crossed Lovers" - 4:51 (Subkutan, 2006)
- "State of Mind" - 5:46 (Two, 2001)
- "Still Unknown" - 5:00 (Subkutan, 2006)
- "Strange Affection" - 4:29 (Monosex, 1998)
- "Summer Sun" - 5:37 (Subkutan, 2006)
- "Sweet Life" - 4:17 (Fairyland?, 1996)

== T ==
- "Take Me Over" - 4:32 (6 Feet Underground, 2004)
- "Take Me to Heaven" - 6:56 (6 Feet Underground, 2004)
- "Take Me to the Time" - 5:26 (Fairyland?, 1996)
- "The Day Before Yesterday" - 4:42 (World Without End, 1993)
- "The Day's Not Done" - 6:12 (Devolution, 2003)
- "The End" - 5:19 (Subkutan, 2006)
- "The Enemy Inside" - 3:47 (Noob, 2007)
- "The Far Side of the Moon" - 4:32 (Noob, 2007)
- "The Gold of the Poor" - 3:45 (Antiquity - Unreleased Tracks 1990-92, 1995)
- "The Scenery Deludes" _{(Tranquilizer-Mix)} - 3:30 (EP Boy on the Street, 1995)
- "The Way You Treat Me" - 4:42 (World Without End, 1993)
- "Time" - 4:49 (Universed in Love, 1996)
- "Time to Be Alive" - 4:59 (Popgefahr, 2010)
- "To Be With You" - 3:39 (World Without End, 1993)
- "Today's Life" - 4:02 (Fairyland?, 1996)
- "Try to Forget" - 3:52 (World Without End, 1993)
- "Twisted Story" - 4:31 (Popgefahr, 2010)

== U ==
- "Uncaring Machine" - 5:17 (Two, 2001)
- "Unputdownable" - 4:33 (6 Feet Underground, 2004)
- "Until the End of Time" - 6:31 (Popgefahr, 2010)
- "Unversed in Love" - 2:23 (Universed in Love (Limited Edition), 1996)

== W ==
- "Wages of Sin" - 1:57 (Fairyland?, 1996)
- "We Fly... Tonight " - 3:49 (Monosex, 1998)
- "We Might Be One for a Day" - 4:34 (Monosex, 1998)
- "What I Feel" - 3:13 (Antiquity - Unreleased Tracks 1990-92, 1995)
- "What It Feels Like" - 4:07 (Noob, 2007)
- "What We Have to Learn" _{(Faster-Mix)} - 4:05 (EP Boy on the Street, 1995)
- "What You Deserve" - 3:39 (Noob, 2007)
- "What's Love All About" - 5:41 (Popgefahr, 2010)
- "When The World Disappeared" - 5:11 (Devolution, 2003)
- "Wrench" - 5:30 (Single Drifing Sideways, 2003)

== Y ==
- "You Say" - 4:55 (Devolution, 2003)
- "Your Are the One" - 6:04 (6 Feet Underground, 2004)
- "Your Hands on My Skin" - 4:43 (World Without End, 1993)
