= De/Vision discography =

- Studio albums: 14
- Live albums: 4
- Singles: 32
- Video albums: 4
- Music videos: 11

This is the discography of German synth-pop band De/Vision.

== Studio albums ==
Year	Details	Peak chart positions
Year	Details	GER
1994	World Without End: Released: 28 January 1994; Label: Strange Ways Records; Format: CD	—
1995	Unversed in Love: Released: 20 January 1995; Label: Strange Ways Records; Format: CD	—
1996	Fairyland?: Released: 9 August 1996; Label: Strange Ways Records; Format: CD	87
1998	Monosex: Released: 14 April 1998; Label: WEA Records; Format: CD	30
2000	Void: Released: 28 February 2000; Label: WEA Records; Format: CD	34
2001	Two: Released: 1 October 2001; Label: E-Wave Records; Format: CD	42
2003	Devolution: Release: 6 January 2003; Label: E-Wave Records; Format: CD	53
2004	6 Feet Underground: Release: 28 June 2004; Label: E-Wave Records; Format: CD	35
2006	Subkutan: Release: 27 January 2006; Label: E-Wave Records; Format: CD	50
2007	NOOB: Release: 24 August 2007; Label: E-Wave Records; Format: CD	44
2010	Popgefahr: Release: 19 March 2010; Label: Popgefahr Records; Format: CD	62
2012	Rockets and Swords: Release: 24 August 2012; Label: Popgefahr Records; Format: CD	39
2016	13: Release: 13 May 2016; Label: None; Format: CD	11
2018	Citybeats: Release: 22 June 2018; Label: Popgefahr Records; Format: CD	38
"—" denotes a release that did not chart.

== Singles ==
Year	Song	GER	Album
1990	"Your Hands on My Skin"	—	Non-album singles
1992	"Boy on the Street"	—	Non-album singles
1993	"Try to Forget"	—	World Without End
1994	"Dinner Without Grace"	—	World Without End
1994	"Love Me Again"	—	Unversed in Love
1995	"Blue Moon"	—	Unversed in Love
1995	"Dress Me When I Bleed"	—	Unversed in Love
1996	"Sweet Life"	—	Fairyland?
1996	"I Regret"	—	Fairyland?
1998	"We Fly Tonight"	47	Monosex
1998	"Strange Affection"	—	Monosex
1998	"Hear Me Calling"	—	Monosex
1999	"Blue Moon 1999"	—	Non-album single
2000	"Foreigner"	76	Void
2000	"Freedom"	—	Void
2001	"Heart-Shaped Tumor"	89	Two
2002	"Lonely Day"	—	Two
2002	"Miss You More"	—	Devolution
2003	"Drifting Sideways"	—	Devolution
2003	"I Regret 2003"	—	Non-album single
2004	"I'm Not Dreaming of You"	—	6 Feet Underground
2004	"Unputdownable"	—	6 Feet Underground
2005	"Turn Me On"	—	6 Feet Underground
2005	"The End"	—	Subkutan
2006	"Love Will Find a Way"	—	Best Of
2007	"Flavour of the Week"	—	NOOB
2009	"Rage/Time to Be Alive"	—	Popgefahr
2011	"Twisted Story"	—	Popgefahr - The Mix
2012	"Brotherhood of Man/Binary Soldier"	—	Rockets and Swords
2012	"Kamikaze"	—	Rockets and Swords
2014	"Brothers in Arms"	—	25 Years - Best of Tour 2013
2016	"Who Am I"	—	13
"—" denotes a release that did not chart.
