= Les Chansons Neurotiques =

Studio album by Neuroticfish
- Released: July 2, 2002
- Recorded: FISHTANK.LH; Pleasure Park, Belgium; Art4Art-Studios, Germany
- Genre: Futurepop
- Length: 58:00
- Label: Dancing Ferret Discs
- Producers: Neuroticfish, Jose Alvarez-Brill, Olaf Wollschläger, Henning Verlage

Neuroticfish chronology
No Instruments (1999)	Les Chansons Neurotiques (2002)	Surimi (2003)

Professional ratings
Review scores
Source	Rating
Metal.de	9/10
Release Magazine	8/10

Les Chansons Neurotiques is the third studio album by Neuroticfish. Female vocals on "Startup" were provided by Eva Spanyar. All songs were written and performed by Neuroticfish.

== Track listing ==
Original 2002 release:

1. "Startup" - 0:46
2. "Reinvent the Pain" - 5:14
3. "Waste" - 3:58
4. "Prostitute" - 4:12
5. "Wake Me Up" - 5:11
6. "Modulator" - 5:10
7. "Breakdown" - 2:37
8. "Darkness / Influence" - 4:38
9. "Stop and Go" - 6:06
10. "It's Not Me" - 5:17
11. "Inverse" - 4:48
12. "Need" - 5:34
13. "Velocity N2" - 4:36

2018 remastered release:

1. "Startup" - 0:45
2. "Reinvent the Pain" - 5:13
3. "Waste" - 3:58
4. "Prostitute" - 4:11
5. "Wake Me Up" - 5:11
6. "Modulator" - 5:10
7. "Breakdown" - 2:36
8. "Darkness / Influence" - 4:38
9. "Stop & Go" - 6:05
10. "It's Not Me" - 5:17
11. "Inverse" - 4:47
12. "Need" - 5:34
13. "Velocity N1" - 5:00 (or "Velocity"; see notes, below)
14. "Care" - 6:08

Notes:

- In the digital-download edition, "Darkness / Influence" is named "Darkness - Influence" instead, due to some computer file-systems not supporting the ' / ' character in a filename. The correct name is still used in the metadata for the file.
- "Velocity" was named "Velocity N2" on the original 2002 releases, where it was considered a bonus-track on the German releases, but a standard-track on the US release. However, for the 2018 remastered release, it was renamed "Velocity N1" on the CD edition, but just "Velocity" on the digital-download edition, and also on various streaming-services.
