= Water to the Dead =

Studio album by Ego Likeness
- Released: 2004
- Label: Dancing Ferret Discs

Ego Likeness chronology
Dragonfly (2000)	Water to the Dead (2004)	South (2009)

Water to the Dead is an album by the gothic rock band Ego Likeness. Released in 2004 on Dancing Ferret Discs, the album takes a more rock approach to their established electronic sound. The name Water to the Dead was, like the band's name, taken from the book Dune by Frank Herbert.

The album also marks the beginning of the band's continuing work with photographer Lauren E. Simonutti.

== Track listing ==
1. Water to the Dead
2. 16 Miles
3. Above the Soil (Isabel's version)
4. Isabel
5. Mandala
6. The Breach
7. Hurricane
8. Axis
9. Traveling Son
10. Wolves
11. Wayfaring Stranger

== Contributing Musicians ==
Justin Dingo Sabe (noise) Tim McCracken (keyboards), Adam Goode (bass), David O’Donnell (drums) Stu Lunn (guitar). Live contributions: Jenny Mettee (bass, cello), Jerome Lintz (drums)
Cover art/ Photography: Lauren E. Simonutti Additional art: Steven Archer
