= DJ Ferret =

- Also known as: DJ Ferret
- Born: Patrick Rodgers; Freeport, Bahamas
- Genres: Gothic; Industrial; Medieval; Trip-Hop; 80s music; Neue Deutsche Welle; Hip hop
- Occupations: DJ; concert promoter; record producer; consumer advocate
- Years active: 1995–present
- Labels: Dancing Ferret Discs; Noir Records; Conch Chowder Records

Patrick Rodgers, known professionally as DJ Ferret, is a Bahamian-born American DJ, concert promoter, record producer and consumer advocate from Philadelphia.

DJ Ferret's releases to date have all been mixes of other artists' work. The most successful of these were the "Underground Club Mix" series associated with Asleep By Dawn magazine. The 3-volume series was initially available only through Hot Topic, although all 3 albums eventually received a brief limited retail release. The first volume included tracks by Paul Van Dyk, Ministry and Skinny Puppy. The second volume was packaged with a DVD and included The 69 Eyes, Eisbrecher and Joachim Witt. On the strength of the included DVD, the title spent one week on the Billboard Comprehensive Music Video Chart at position #38 in the issue dated 25 November 2006. The third and final volume included Robert Smith of The Cure, Information Society, In This Moment, Type O Negative, and a reading of "The Raven" by actor Christopher Lee. Together, the three volumes sold in excess of 50,000 units.

His first release as DJ Ferret was in 2003. "Noir: Smooth Female Trip-Hop" collected Trip-Hop tracks with female vocals from Japan, Russia, England and the US.

In 2006 he released "Big Up Berlin: Best Of German Hip Hop And Reggae," which he described as the first American compilation of German hip-hop. Some of Germany's best-selling hip-hop and reggae artists participated, including Seeed, Kool Savas, Azad, Bushido and Fler. Tracks by a few lesser-known artists were also included. AllMusic described it as "a smashing compilation that bundles together 17 German hip-hop and dancehall artists onto one fabulous CD" and "a bridge-building compilation that spans hip-hop and dancehall and Europe and the New World." He later put out another German hip-hop mix called "Ende Gute, Alles Gute" as an unofficial online release in 2017.

"Dancing In The Dark: 10 Years Of Dancing Ferret " and "Dancing In The Dark 2006" were compilations produced under his own name and included a VNV Nation remix of a Joachim Witt track, Faun, Corvus Corax and De/Vision. Actress Kristanna Loken of Terminator 3: Rise of the Machines fame was the cover model for the latter title, wearing her original outfit from the movie.

Also credited as "Patrick Rodgers" was a soundtrack for the roleplaying game Vampire: The Masquerade. Produced under license from White Wolf Publishing and released in 1999, the CD was titled "Music From The Succubus Club" and included one track devoted to each of the vampire clans in the game.

DJ Ferret is still actively performing live DJ gigs. He performed at Beats from the Vault in Estonia and the M'era Luna festival in Germany in August 2024. He played as part of the Boxing Day Festival in Stanley, The Falkland Islands, in 2025. He also performs a semi-regular video DJ event in Philadelphia called "240 Minutes," playing only videos that originally appeared on the MTV program, "120 Minutes."

As a concert promoter, he is best known for his "Dracula's Ball" event, which has taken place since 1996 and is one of the largest events for goths and vampires in the country. The 40th Dracula's Ball sold out without running a single print ad or media story. The Dracula's Ball 20-Year Anniversary party also sold out and featured performances by Front 242 and Covenant

Outside of the music industry, Rodgers is known for his consumer advocacy, particularly a lawsuit in which he became the first American to "foreclose" on a bank, leading CNN to refer to him as a "folk hero." A video of one of his television interviews regarding the suit has over 2.4 million views. He subsequently appeared on The Colbert Report. Rodgers also later sued eBay over a consumer matter. Of his consumer advocacy, he said "It makes me sad to say this, but I wish more people would learn how to sue in small claims court. So many companies have made it clear that customer service is not a priority for them. Americans need to force them to rethink that position."

In April 2019, Amazon tapped DJ Ferret (as Patrick Rodgers) to host a talk show titled "Interviewed By A Vampire" for broadcast on Amazon Prime. The first season of three episodes featured guests Derrick Pitts, Kyle Cassidy, and Rodney Anonymous.

Rodgers produced a compilation of new music to support the White Rose Foundation in Munich, which was released in November of 2026.

== Discography ==
- Asleep By Dawn Magazine Presents DJ Ferret's Underground Club Mix #1
- Asleep By Dawn Magazine Presents DJ Ferret's Underground Club Mix #2
- Asleep By Dawn Magazine Presents DJ Ferret's Underground Club Mix #3
- Dancing In The Dark: 10 Years Of Dancing Ferret (credited as Patrick Rodgers)
- Dancing In The Dark 2006 (credited as Patrick Rodgers)
- DJ Ferret Presents Big Up Berlin: Best Of German Hip Hop And Reggae
- DJ Ferret Presents Noir: Smooth Female Trip-Hop
- Ende Gute, Alles Gute (online mix tape)
- Music From The Succubus Club (credited as Patrick Rodgers)
