= The Order of the Reptile =

Studio album by Ego Likeness
- Released: July 4, 2006
- Recorded: Egotrip Studios, Baltimore, MD
- Genre: Darkwave, Electronic
- Length: 53:31
- Label: Dancing Ferret
- Producer: Steven Archer

Ego Likeness chronology
Water to the Dead (2004)	The Order of the Reptile (2006)	Breedless (2010)

Professional ratings
Review scores
Source	Rating
Vampirefreaks.com	8/10 stars

The Order of the Reptile is the third full-length album by darkwave musical duo Ego Likeness. It was released on July 4, 2006 on Dancing Ferret Discs.

== Track listing ==
No.	Title	Length
1.	"Weave"	4:18
2.	"Burn Witch Burn"	4:42
3.	"Smothered"	4:12
4.	"Aviary"	3:31
5.	"Save Your Serpent"	7:29
6.	"Severine"	3:51
7.	"World of Shame"	5:37
8.	"The Foolish Man Who Has No Home"	4:14
9.	"Seventy-Nine"	4:55
10.	"Raise Your Red Flags"	4:59
11.	"Afterhours" (The Sisters of Mercy cover)	5:43
Total length:		53:31
