= Pretty When You Cry (disambiguation) =

Pretty When You Cry is a 2001 film with Sam Elliot.

- "Pretty When You Cry" song by VAST from the 1998 album Visual Audio Sensory Theater
- "Pretty When You Cry" song by A Thorn for Every Heart from their 2004 album Things Aren't So Beautiful Now
- "Pretty When You Cry" song by Lana Del Rey from her 2014 album Ultraviolence
