= Gelb (album) =

Studio album by Neuroticfish
- Released: February 15, 2005
- Recorded: 2004
- Genres: Futurepop, EBM, synth-pop
- Length: 64:16
- Label: Dancing Ferret Discs

Neuroticfish chronology
Surimi (2003)	Gelb (2005)

Gelb (released 2005 on Strangeways) is the fifth studio album from futurepop-electronic body music project Neuroticfish.

== Track listing ==
Original 2005 release:

1. "Loading" - 1:40
2. "Why Don't You Hate Me?" - 6:45
3. "The Bomb" - 5:55
4. "I Don't Need the City" - 4:39
5. "I Never Chose You" - 6:11
6. "Waving Hands" - 5:03
7. "Short Commercial Break" - 0:40
8. "Ich Spüre Keinen Schmerz" - 4:24
9. "Are You Alive?" - 5:29
10. "You're the Fool" - 4:56
11. "Solid You" - 4:43
12. "They're Coming to Take Me Away" - 3:33 (cover of Napoleon XIV song)
13. "Suffocating Right" - 5:24

2016 remastered edition:

1. "Why Don't You Hate Me?" - 8:24 (the previously-separate track, "Loading", has been merged into the start)
2. "The Bomb" - 5:55
3. "I Don't Need the City" - 4:39
4. "I Never Chose You" - 6:11
5. "Waving Hands" - 5:03
6. "Short Commercial Break" - 0:41
7. "Ich Spüre Keinen Schmerz" - 4:25
8. "Are You Alive?" - 5:27
9. "You're the Fool" - 4:57
10. "Solid You" - 4:11
11. "They're Coming to Take Me Away" - 3:33
12. "Suffocating Right" - 5:11
13. "No More Ghosts" - 5:13
14. "Care (Greek Symphony Version)" - 4:53
15. "I Don't Need the City (remix)" - 6:02 (this track appears on some releases only)
