= Krankhaus =

Studio album by Angelspit
- Released: 6 June 2006
- Recorded: 2006
- Genre: Electro-industrial
- Length: 56:02
- Label: self-released
- Producers: Destroyx, ZooG

Angelspit chronology
Nurse Grenade (2004)	Krankhaus (2006)	Blood Death Ivory (2008)

Professional ratings
Review scores
Source	Rating
Chain D.L.K.	4.5/5 stars
Music Discovery.de	5/5 stars

Krankhaus (comes from "Krankenhaus" which is German for Hospital) is the debut studio album by Australian electro-industrial band Angelspit. It was self-released on 6 June 2006, and re-released on 30 January 2007 with a bonus remix disc and in the US by Dancing Ferret Discs, entitled Surgically Atoned, containing remixes by The Tenth Stage, Combichrist, Tankt, The Crystalline Effect and even Angelspit themselves. A music video for "Vena Cava" was released.

== Track listing ==
All tracks are written by Destroyx, ZooG.

No.	Title	Length
1.	"À la Mode, À la Mort"	3:53
2.	"Vena Cava"	3:30
3.	"Elixir"	3:47
4.	"100%"	3:15
5.	"Juicy"	3:55
6.	"Flesh Stitched Onto a Frame"	1:07
7.	"Make You Sin"	4:01
8.	"Get Even"	4:40
9.	"Dead Letter"	4:26
10.	"Black Wine"	5:48
11.	"Scars and Stripes"	4:47
12.	"Create Desire"	4:15
13.	"Wolf"	4:05
14.	"Wreak Havoc"	4:33
15.	"Elixir" (Pill Binge Remix) (Web bonus track)	4:44
Total length:		56:02

Special Edition Surgically Atoned bonus disc
No.	Title	Remixer	Length
1.	"100%" (110% Fucked Mix)	Combichrist	5:14
2.	"Create Desire"	The Mercy Cage	5:23
3.	"Vena Cava"	Ego Likeness	3:42
4.	"Make You Sin"	Diverje	5:02
5.	"Wreak Havok"	Stromkern	4:19
6.	"Juicy"	Tankt	4:26
7.	"Wolf"	Angelspit	5:21
8.	"Scars and Stripes"	The Process Void	4:42
9.	"Get Even"	The Crystalline Effect	4:49
10.	"Dead Letter"	Angel Theory	4:26
11.	"100%"	The Tenth Stage	7:11
12.	"A la Mode, A la Mort"	Angelspit	4:17
13.	"Elixir"	The Tenth Stage	3:56
14.	"Scars and Stripes" (Australian and Web bonus track)	n0nplus	7:50
15.	"Create Desire" (Inject Remix) (Australian and Web bonus track)	The Mercy Cage	5:23
Total length:			1:16:36

== Trivia ==
- Fans who purchased Krankhaus from the official Angelspit store received a letter from ZooG, thanking them for supporting Angelspit's album release, along with a badge of the 'red baron' (the logo for the Krankhaus album).
- The "Elixir" (Pill Binge Remix) is listed on the official website's discography as a bonus web only track is offered as a free MP3 download (NOTE: The link, though still describing itself as before, is currently instead pointing at a sample of the first minute of Elixr, and the site administrator has not responded to questions about the change.). It is not available on the CD itself.
- Combichrist, responsible for the "100%" (110% Fucked Mix), made a second remix of "100%" entitled "100%" (99% Rawmix) that was not released on the Surgically Atoned remix disc. It was, however, released on two separate compilation albums ADVANCED ELECTRONICS 5 and Fxxk the Mainstream
