= April (VAST album) =

2007 album by VAST

Studio album by VAST
- Released: October 16, 2007
- Recorded: 2006
- Studio: 5th Street Studios, Austin, Texas, Blue Velvet Studio, Orange County, California, and Infinite Recording, Reading, Massachusetts
- Genre: Alternative rock, acoustic rock
- Length: 41:20
- Label: 2blossoms
- Producer: Jon Crosby, Michael Austinmoore

VAST chronology
| Seattle 2007 (2006) | April (2007) | Me and You (2009) |

April (Online Version)

Studio album by VAST
- Released: 2006
- Recorded: 2005 in Austin, Texas
- Genre: Alternative rock, acoustic rock
- Length: 34:19
- Label: 2blossoms
- Producer: Jon Crosby

Professional ratings
Review scores
| Source | Rating |
|---|---|
| AllMusic | 3.5/5 stars |

April is the fifth album by the band VAST.

VAST recorded two different versions of the album. The Online Version was recorded all in one take with little mastering, which was then released in 2006 as an online download on Crosby's independent label, 2blossoms. This version is not considered to be the "finished" version, according to Jon Crosby. The Retail Version, released on October 16, 2007, is the fully mastered, completed version of the album, and features differing track lengths, a reordered track list, and the addition of the songs Dedicate (A Place for Me), Everything Passing By, Frog, Is It Me and Take Me with You.

The tracks "Be with Me" and "I Can't Say No (To You)" previously appeared on Nude and Turquoise & Crimson (Retail Version), however on this release they are performed in a more acoustic fashion.

== Track contents ==
=== Online version ===
(All songs written by Jon Crosby)

1. "You're Too Young" – 3:03
2. "Sunday I'll Be Gone" – 3:30
3. "One More Day" – 3:31
4. "I'm Too Good" – 3:22
5. "I Am a Vampire" – 2:58
6. "She Visits Me" – 2:54
7. "Tattoo of Your Name" – 3:46
8. "Be With Me" – 3:35
9. "Having Part of You" – 4:01
10. "I Can't Say No (To You)"

Different versions of "Be With Me" and "I Can't Say No (To You)" appeared on both Nude and Turquoise & Crimson (Retail Version).

=== Retail version ===
(All songs written by Jon Crosby)

1. "You're Too Young" – 3:11
2. "Dedicate (A Place for Me)" – 4:18
3. "Everything Passing By" – 4:01
4. "Sunday I'll Be Gone" – 3:37
5. "Frog" – 3:04
6. "One More Day" – 3:33
7. "Tattoo of Your Name" – 3:45
8. "Is It Me" – 2:54
9. "I'm Too Good" – 3:25
10. "She Visits Me" – 2:54
11. "I Am a Vampire" – 3:00
12. "Take Me With You" – 3:35
