= Plastic Heart =

Plastic Heart(s) may refer to:

- Plastic Hearts, a 2020 album by American singer Miley Cyrus, or its title track
- "Plastic Heart", a 2010 song by the German synthpop band De/Vision
- "Plastic Heart", a 2017 song by American singer Nostalghia
- "Plastic Hearts", a song by Dirty Pretty Things from the album Romance at Short Notice, 2008
- "Plastic Hearts", a song by Newton Faulkner from the album Studio Zoo, 2013
