= No Instruments =

Studio album by Neuroticfish
- Released: September 27, 1999
- Genre: Futurepop
- Length: 51:39
- Labels: Four.Rock; Interbeat; VISION; Bloodline; Dancing Ferret Discs
- Producer: Neuroticfish

Neuroticfish chronology
| No Instruments (1999) | Les Chansons Neurotiques (2002) |

Professional ratings
Review scores
| Source | Rating |
|---|---|
| Release Magazine | 7/10 |

No Instruments is the debut album by Neuroticfish released in 1999.

== Track listing ==
1. "Close" - 3:49
2. "Unexpected" - 4:23
3. "Skin" - 4:05
4. "Black Again" - 5:08
5. "Pain" - 5:10
6. "Inside" - 5:06
7. "Mechanic of the Sequence" - 4:07
8. "M.F.A.P.L." - 4:19
9. "Breaking the Cliche" - 4:14
10. "Hospitality" - 4:03
11. "War" - 3:32
12. "Ultrahymn" - 3:45

== Bloodline re-release ==
This is the first re-release of the album from 2000. This version features two bonus tracks "M.F.A.P.L. (Intelligent Tribal Freak Mix)" and "All I Say".

Track listing

1. "Close" - 3:49
2. "Unexpected" - 4:23
3. "Skin" - 4:05
4. "Black Again" - 5:08
5. "Pain" - 5:10
6. "Inside" - 5:06
7. "Mechanic of the Sequence" - 4:07
8. "M.F.A.P.L." - 4:19
9. "Breaking the Cliche" - 4:14
10. "Hospitality" - 4:03
11. "War" - 3:32
12. "Ultrahymn" - 3:45
13. "M.F.A.P.L (Intelligent Tribal Freak Mix)" - 5:19
14. "All I Say" - 8:19

== US release ==
This is the second re-release of the album from 2006. The other two versions were not released in the United States. This version also features two bonus tracks "M.F.A.P.L. (Intelligent Tribal Freak Mix)" and "All I Say". The album artwork for this version of the album was selected through an art contest held at vampirefreaks.com.

Track listing

1. "Close" - 3:49
2. "Unexpected" - 4:23
3. "Skin" - 4:05
4. "Black Again" - 5:08
5. "Pain" - 5:10
6. "Inside" - 5:06
7. "Mechanic of the Sequence" - 4:07
8. "M.F.A.P.L." - 4:19
9. "Breaking the Cliche" - 4:14
10. "Hospitality" - 4:03
11. "War" - 3:32
12. "Ultrahymn" - 3:45
13. "M.F.A.P.L (Intelligent Tribal Freak Mix)" - 5:19
14. "All I Say" - 8:19
