= Dragonfly (Ego Likeness album) =

Studio album by Ego Likeness
- Released: October 26, 2000
- Recorded: February – July 2000
- Label: Noir

Ego Likeness chronology
Songs from a Dead City (2000)	Dragonfly (2000)	Water to the Dead (2009)

Professional ratings
Review scores
Source	Rating
Legends Magazine	(favorable)

Dragonfly is an album by the gothic rock band Ego Likeness.

Dragonfly, released in 2000 on the band's own record label Angelfall Music, is the band's first full-length CD. The follow-up to their 1999 demo, Songs from a Dead City, Dragonfly continued to develop the band's eclectic sound and atmosphere.

Recorded over a nine-month period of self-imposed isolation, Dragonfly begins the band's exploration of personal loss, regret, betrayal, growth and change.

== Track listing ==
1. "A Different Kind of Loss" – 1:36
2. "Hydra" – 6:27
3. "Second Skin" – 6:49
4. "Drown Like You" – 6:04
5. "The Ocean Beside Us" – 4:09
6. "The Map Is Not the Territory" – 6:59
7. "Song to the Divine" – 4:52
8. "Blind Arms" – 5:14
9. "Too Many Empty Nests" – 4:10
10. "I Live On What’s Left" – 4:02
11. "Aurora" – 8:17
12. "The Explanation at the Center of It All" – 4:07

== Personnel ==
- S. Archer – Synthesizer, Guitar, Programming, Vocals, Treatments, Cover Art
- Nick Church – Photography
- Michael Fitzgerald – Video Producer
- Shaun Mason – Guitar
- Contributing Musicians – Justin Dingo Sabe (noise), Stephanie Kim (violin), Shaun Mason (guitar).
- Live contributions – Daniel Mullen (guitar), Amanda Mason (keyboards, backing vocals), Jenny Mettee (bass).

== Trivia ==
- The dialog samples in "A Different Kind of Loss" are taken from the David Cronenberg film Dead Ringers.
- The versions of "Second Skin", "Song to the Divine", "Drown Like You" and "The Map Is Not the Territory" released on the CDR demos of the album have no guitar.
- While they did perform a handful of shows after the release of Songs From a Dead City, the couple decided it was best to keep the band a studio only project. The positive feedback generated by Dragonfly caused the couple to reconsider their choice and rework the material for the stage.
- Dragonfly marks the beginning of Justin 'Dingo' Sabe's longtime involvement with the band.
- The songs "Axis", "Above the Soil (Edward's Version)", and "The Hanging Years" were recorded in rapid succession over the period of three weeks after the album was completed. "Axis" was later released with additional overdubbed guitar on Water to the Dead.
- "Above the Soil" exists in several forms; the original "Edward's Version" appears on the compilation Emotional Overdrive released in 2001. The heavier "Isabel's Version" was recorded for Water to the Dead. Edward and Isabel are characters in Donna Lynch's novel The Good Mothers.
- 'The "Hanging Years" was re-written and re-titled and is to be released on the 2006 album The Order of the Reptile.
- The sample "It's down so low," in the song "Aurora" was unknowingly provided by Donna during the recording process. The weight of the microphone she was using caused the stand to lower over the course of the vocal take.
- The album remained untitled until the couple settled on a concept for the cover art. While no direct relationship to any specific song on the album, the band felt the dragonfly represented both universal as well as personal transformation, a central theme in the album.
- Moments after the final vocal take for "Song to the Divine", the smoke detector in the building rang signaling a fire two floors below.
