= Miss You More =

Miss You More may refer to:

- "Miss You More", song by BBMak from "Back Here" 1999
- "Miss You More", single from De/Vision discography 2002
- "Miss You More", song by Katy Perry from Witness
