= Neuroticfish =

German musical project

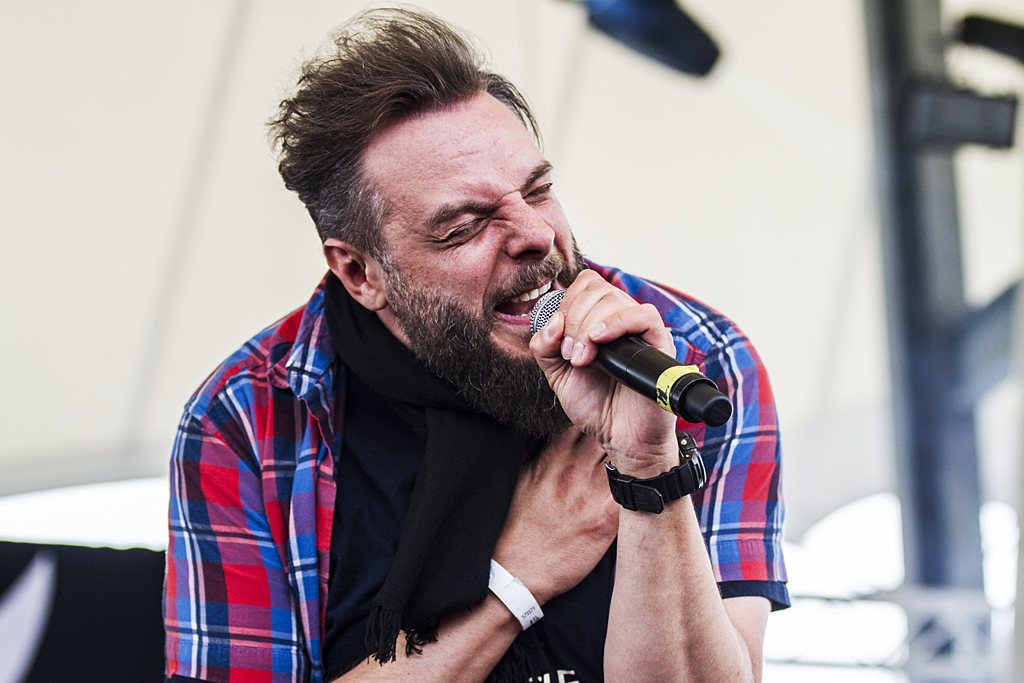
- Neuroticfish on the Blackfield Festival 2013

Background information
- Origin: Bochum, Germany
- Genres: Futurepop; EBM; synth-pop
- Years active: 1998–2008; 2012–present
- Labels: Bloodline; Dancing Ferret Discs
- Members: Sascha Mario Klein; Henning Verlage (2003–present)
- Website: Neuroticfish.com

Neuroticfish is a German musical project whose styles are borrowed from electronic body music, futurepop, and synthpop, as well as other types of electronic music. It has released music on the Dancing Ferret Discs record label.

== History ==
Neuroticfish's sole member is Sascha Mario Klein. Klein cites his musical inspirations as such bands as Skinny Puppy, Nine Inch Nails, The Cure, and Depeche Mode, and began experimenting with music on his own in the early 90s. After starting Neuroticfish, Klein did not make the typical efforts of a musician to send out a demo; instead, he relied on the internet to release and promote his music. Klein was eventually offered a place on a synthpop sampler called A Reflexion of Synthpop, which allowed the project to gain popularity within the club scene.

The project gained some notoriety for two songs—"Black Again" and "Prostitute"—containing the sample "Electronic body music is dead", which Neuroticfish adopted as a catchphrase. The single "The Bomb" contains advertisement for the band's website, www.ebmisdead.com.

In 2002, two singles charted on the Deutsche Alternative Charts: "Prostitute" at number 3 for 8 weeks and WakeMeUp! at number 4, also for 8 weeks.

On 4 January 2008, the official Neuroticfish MySpace page announced that the band would cease to exist after its performance at the 2008 Wave-Gotik-Treffen festival in Leipzig, Germany. On 12 May, the official web site for the project stated that the musical project had been "closed".

On 20 July 2012 an official Facebook page and Homepage resurfaced, stating that Neuroticfish are back and working on a new album.

On March 13, 2013, a new Song ("Former Me") was released on SoundCloud.

On July 4, 2013, the band revealed a new track off the upcoming album ("Illusion of Home") on SoundCloud, which received more than 1000 plays in the first 24 hours of being uploaded. In an interview with South African music news website Downtuned.co.za a few days later, the band confirmed that the album title would be "A Sign of Life", and that the band was aiming for release later in the year. Although it would be delayed, the album saw release on March 27, 2015.

== Discography ==
=== Albums ===
- No Instruments (1999)
- No Instruments Second Edition (2000)
- Les Chansons Neurotiques (2002)
- Gelb (2005)
- A Greater Good (History 1998-2008) (Best of) (2008)
- A Sign Of Life (2015)
- Antidoron (2018)
- The Demystification of the Human Heart (2023)

=== Singles ===
- "Music For A Paranormal Life" (1999)
- "Velocity N1" (2000)
- "Prostitute" (2002)
- "Fluchtreflex" (2019)

=== Singles collection ===
- Sushi (2001)
- Surimi (2003)

=== EPs ===
- WakeMeUp! (2001)
- Need / It's Not Me (2002)
- Bomb (2005)
- Limited Behaviour (2013)
- Agony (2016)
- Velocity N20 (2022)
- Skin26 (2026)
