= Art book =

Art book or artbook may refer to:

- artbook.com, the website of Distributed Art Publishers
- Artist's book, a work of art in the form of a book
- Coffee table book, an oversized book featuring photographs and illustrations
- Livre d'art, a book featuring commentary alongside illustrations

== See also ==
- Book arts (disambiguation)
- Photo book
- Picture book
