= Generica =

Generica Vol. I-V
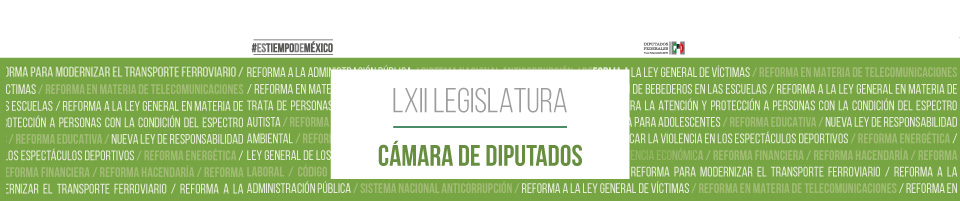

EP series by Jon Crosby
- Released: 2007–2008
- Recorded: 2007–2008
- Genre: Alternative rock, acoustic rock
- Length: 165:44
- Label: 2blossoms

Generica is the collective title of a series of five EPs released by Jon Crosby, lead singer and founder of the rock band VAST.

The collection of songs was also released as a double-album with a plain white cover featuring Crosby's name and the album title, containing slightly different mixes of some tracks.

== Origins ==
In late 2007 and early 2008, Jon Crosby released five download-only EPs on the band's website, under the collective title Generica, which was to be "an exploration of people, places and American music." The first three volumes were composed of solo acoustic guitar songs, while the last two were recorded along with VAST band members under the name "Jon Crosby And The Resonator Band". Crosby stressed the difference between this outfit and VAST:

When we put out "April" we were toying with the idea of releasing it as a JCRB album because the style was such a departure from previous VAST music. But then I thought, just because the music is different that doesn't mean it has to be a side project. Plus, a side project with the same members seemed a little bizarre. As we were recording the songs that would eventually go on Generica five we planned on putting them on a VAST album. Commercially it would have made more sense because people have heard of VAST but most people have not heard of JCRB. But to me, this music isn't VAST.

== Track listing ==
All songs by Jon Crosby unless otherwise noted.

=== Jon Crosby ===
==== Generica Vol. I (2007) ====
1. "I Wanted It For You" — 3:15
2. "Hotel Song" — 3:26
3. "It's Not Love" — 2:20
4. "Generica" — 2:38
5. "If She Wasn't Married" — 2:56
6. "All I Care About Is You" — 3:18
7. "Punish Me" — 2:42
8. "Drawing Horses" — 3:23
9. "Sign Onto Me" — 2:54
10. "It's A Wonderful Day To Be Yours" — 2:57

==== Generica Vol. II (2008) ====
1. "Those Jealous Lips" — 3:10
2. "One Way To Win (And A Million Ways To Lose)" — 3:03
3. "Poor Chicken" (Old Hack) — 3:28
4. "Evan" — 2:35
5. "Generica — 2:35
6. "When We First Met" — 3:21
7. "Lullaby" (Barry Sadler) — 3:00
8. "Ya Just Don't Count" — 2:09
9. "You" — 2:42
10. "Having Part Of You" — 3:29
- This volume was recorded along with Adam Rebeske on cello, in front of a live audience in Arizona.
- Tracks 3 and 7 are covers. Track 9 was originally on the VAST album Visual Audio Sensory Theater

==== Generica Vol. III (2008) ====
1. "She Found Out" — 3:35
2. "Until I Die" — 2:55
3. "Here's To All The People I Have Lost" — 3:54
4. "I Thought By Now" — 3:38
5. "I'm Afraid Of You" — 3:26
6. "Tuesday Night In Austin" — 3:42
7. "Everything Has Changed" — 2:36
8. "You Are The One" — 3:15
9. "You Destroy Me" — 2:56
10. "Travelin' Man" — 2:33

=== Jon Crosby And The Resonator Band ===
==== Generica Vol. IV (2008) ====
1. "You Should Have Known I'd Leave" — 3:00
2. "Hotel Song" — 3:26
3. "Travelin' Man" — 2:41
4. "You're The Same" — 5:07
5. "Everything Has Changed" — 2:41
6. "You Destroy Me" — 3:55
7. "You Are The One" — 3:24
8. "What Really Makes A Difference" — 3:19
9. "If She Wasn't Married" — 3:11
10. "Generica" — 3:16

==== Generica Vol. V (2008) ====
1. "Until I Die" — 3:01
2. "Here's To All The People I Have Lost" — 4:23
3. "I Thought By Now" — 3:51
4. "I'm Afraid Of You" — 3:28
5. "You're The Same" — 5:10
6. "Let's Run Away" — 3:06
7. "There Are No Words" — 4:03
8. "It's Not You (It's Me)" — 4:07
9. "Tuesday Night In Austin" — 5:00
10. "She Found Out" — 3:44
