= West (EP) =

EP by Ego Likeness
- Released: 30 Oct 2009
- Recorded: 2008, Egotrip Studios
- Genre: Darkwave, Industrial
- Length: 26:39
- Label: Self-Released

Ego Likeness chronology
South (2007)	West (2009)	North (2009)

West is the sixth album by Ego Likeness and is the second in their Compass EP series. It was self-released in 2008 and was available for purchase only at tour locations or through their website. Only 300 copies were pressed and were individually numbered and autographed. According to the official website, the album is sold out but the songs are to be rereleased at a later date.

== Track listing ==
1. "Sirens and Satellites" – 5:31
2. "I Live on What's Left" (2008) – 3:32
3. "Burn Witch Burn" (Hypofixx Remix) – 8:21
4. "The Egg of the Mother" (2002 Original Version of "Save Your Serpent") – 4:47
5. "Severine" (Sidhe Mix by Hopeful Machines) – 4:28
