= Nude (VAST album) =

Studio album by VAST
- Released: February 24, 2004
- Recorded: 2001–2002 in Santa Fe, New Mexico
- Genre: Alternative rock, industrial rock
- Length: 45:16; 52:22 (EU Version)
- Label: 456 Entertainment / SPV
- Producer: Jon Crosby

VAST chronology
Music For People (2000)	Nude (2004)	A Complete Demonstration (2005)

Nude is the third studio album by the band VAST, released on Carson Daly's independent label 456 Entertainment. It was released on February 24, 2004. The album is made up of remastered and remixed demos from the online Turquoise & Crimson releases.

A European version of the album was also released, which includes two bonus tracks and a sixteen-page booklet housed in a cardboard slipcase. The bonus tracks included are Falling from the Sky (as track 13) and I Woke Up L.A. (as track 14).

With the release of Turquoise & Crimson (Retail Version), the album was made obsolete, because the double album featured all of the songs on Nude, remastered from their unfinished versions released online, and mixed with many new songs. Crosby marketed the album through his own independent label after his unhappiness with 456 Entertainment. He later claimed that releasing Nude on 456 Entertainment was a "disaster, and not a very good idea".

During the promotional phase of the album's release, the band played on Last Call with Carson Daly and performed their single "Thrown Away". The single was also used in the penultimate season 1 finale of One Tree Hill, "The Leaving Song".

== Track listing ==
All songs written by Jon Crosby.

1. "Turquoise" – 3:20
2. "Thrown Away" – 4:01
3. "Don't Take Your Love Away" – 4:57
4. "Be With Me" – 3:54
5. "Lost" – 4:01
6. "Winter in My Heart" – 3:36
7. "I Need to Say Goodbye" – 3:22
8. "Japanese Fantasy" – 3:01
9. "Ecstacy" – 3:34
10. "Candle" – 3:28
11. "I Can't Say No (To You)" – 4:19
12. "Desert Garden" – 3:43

== EU Version Track listing ==
1. "Turquoise" – 3:20
2. "Thrown Away" – 4:01
3. "Don't Take Your Love Away" – 4:57
4. "Be With Me" – 3:54
5. "Lost" – 4:01
6. "Winter in My Heart" – 3:36
7. "I Need to Say Goodbye" – 3:22
8. "Japanese Fantasy" – 3:01
9. "Ecstacy" – 3:34
10. "Candle" – 3:28
11. "I Can't Say No (To You)" – 4:19
12. "Desert Garden" – 3:43
13. "Falling from the Sky" – 3:27
14. "I Woke Up L.A." – 3:39

== Reception ==
Professional ratings
Review scores
Source	Rating
Allmusic	2.5/5 stars

Critical reception was mostly mixed, Allmusic noted that "his faraway vocal choirs and manipulated sound effects have the ability to evoke the unsettled tension that once tinged Lacuna Coil's dark electronic experiments...unfortunately these atmospheres deflate in the face of guitar-heavy modern rock appliques," and giving the album a 2.5 out of 5. The album has recently become a fan favorite and rarity after it was dropped out of print in recent years.
