= The Last Dance (band) =

American band

- Origin: Los Angeles, California, United States
- Genre: Dark wave
- Years active: 1990–present
- Label: Mystine Records
- Members: Jeff Diehm; Rick Joyce; Tom Coyne; Peter J. Gorritz; Velvet Joyce
- Past members: Ian Haas; Tony Tullai; Ivan Dominguez
- Website: TheLastDance.com

The Last Dance is an American dark wave band from Southern California that was for several years signed to the now-defunct Dancing Ferret Discs label. Formed in 1990, they have released five albums, an EP, a remix album, and a documentary film was made of them in 2007 titled Almost Beautiful. Along with former labelmates the Crüxshadows and Ego Likeness, the band remains one of the more popular groups associated with the third wave of the gothic rock movement.

== Biography ==
Jeff Diehm (vocals), Rick Joyce (guitar), Tony Tullai (bass) and Ian Haas (drums) formed the Last Dance in the early 1990s in Los Angeles, California. As a small local band for several years, the Last Dance released two cassette albums, Everyone and Angel; in 1995, they released an EP, Tragedy. By the mid-1990s, they had crafted several club favorites, including "Fairytales" and "Do You Believe in Angels?" "Fairytales" was the title track on their first full-length album, which released in 1996. This was followed by their first US tour in the summer of 1997.

Their next album, Perfect, was released 2001. By this point, Hauus had been replaced by Ivan "Lucky" Dominguez on drums. The band toured the US again and Europe for the first time with Switchblade Symphony.

In 2002, tragedy struck the Last Dance. Dominguez died of pneumonia on August 3, while the band was touring in Europe. The last show that he played with the band was on [July 31] in Leipzig, Germany; the last song that he played with the band was a cover of "Dead Man's Party" by Oingo Boingo (coincidentally, it was also the last song the band recorded for Whispers in Rage). The band played a memorial show for Dominguez 15 days later and replaced him with Tom Coyne, who had played with Rick Joyce in the Prophetess from 1993 to 1996. However, even as of 2005 the Last Dance lists Coyne as a "performing drummer", a role also shared by Stevyn Grey (Christian Death, Faith and the Muse, Frankenstein). Ivan Dominguez is still listed prominently among their members as the band's "Friend and Brother". The last track of the Last Dance's 2003 album, Whispers in Rage, contains Dominguez's drumming, and Dominguez's death played somewhat into the writing of the album's other songs.

Over their career, the Last Dance has toured the United States, Europe, and Latin America. Starting with their 1999 album, One Thousand Nine Hundred Ninety-Nine, they have released several albums that they only sold while on tour; these albums most frequently contain remixes of songs that appeared on their most recent full-length. Their most recent remix album, Reflections of Rage (2003), contained remixes of several songs from Whispers in Rage as well as songs dating from earlier in their career. Cyrusrex, collaborator of Skinny Puppy, Thomas Rainer of L'Âme Immortelle, and Rachel McDonnell of the Crüxshadows were among those who appeared on Reflections of Rage. Perhaps the most distinctive aspect of Reflections of Rage was that the Last Dance did a darkwave-tinged cover of Britney Spears' song "Oops, I Did It Again".

The Last Dance released their next album, Once Beautiful, on September 20, 2005, on Dancing Ferret Discs. A music video for the song "Once Beautiful" was shot by Sandy Collora, the director of Batman: Dead End.

In September 2005, the band toured the U.S. for six weeks with a film crew in tow. A documentary on the tour was filmed by LifeLine Entertainment, produced by Roy Thomasson and directed by Rocky Costanzo. The documentary, titled Almost Beautiful, was released in 2007, and it was shown at several film festivals before it was released on DVD.

In 2007, the band did tour in favor of playing sporadic festivals around the US and Europe, including the Wave-Gotik-Treffen Festival in Germany and Dragon*Con in Atlanta on September 28, 2006. The Last Dance got a sponsor deal from the Bleeding Edge gothic line of merchandise.

As of 2015, after a nearly decade-long hiatus, the band released the album Ruins. Their single "Cages" makes appearances on several compilation albums.

== Members ==
=== Current members ===
- Jeff Diehm - lead vocals
- Rick Joyce - solo-guitar
- Peter J. Gorritz - leader bass, synth bass
- Tom Coyne - drums (performing member)
- Stevyn Grey - drums (performing member)
- Simon Rippin - drums (guest drummer)
- Velvet Joyce - female vocals
- Marc Engenhart - rhythm guitar (touring member)

=== Former members ===
- Ivan Dominguez - drums
- Ian Haas - drums (1990–96)
- Tony Tullai - bass (1990–93)
- Robert Schott - Synth/Guitar (1997-01)

== Discography ==
=== Albums ===
- Tragedy EP (1995, Apollyon Records)
- Fairytales (1996)
- Perfect (2002, 7 Sin Records and Apollyon Records)
- Now and Forever (2002, Mystine Records and Apollyon Records)
- Whispers in Rage (2003, Dancing Ferret Discs)
- Reflections of Rage (2004, Dancing Ferret Discs)
- Once Beautiful (2005, Dancing Ferret Discs)
- Ruins (2015, Mystine Records)

=== Videos ===
- Almost Beautiful (2007, documentary film)

=== Remixes and special releases ===
- Everyone & Angel
- Staring at the Sky (1998)
- One Thousand Nine Hundred Ninety-Nine (1999)
- Duo-Milia (2000)
- Now and Forever After (2006)
