= Assimilate: A Critical History of Industrial Music =

- First edition cover
- Authors: S. Alexander Reed
- Language: English
- Subject: Music, Industrial music
- Publisher: Oxford University Press
- Publication date: 2013
- Publication place: United States
- Media type: Print (Paperback)
- Pages: 376
- ISBN: 9780199832606

Assimilate: A Critical History of Industrial Music is a 2013 book by S. Alexander Reed, published by Oxford University Press, and bills itself as "the first serious study published on industrial music."

== Synopsis ==
The book is an attempt to chart the history of industrial music as a genre from its early influences (including art music, Italian Futurism, Situationism, and the works of Antonin Artaud and William S. Burroughs) to the present day (including its connections to political radicalism, the gothic subculture, and dance music).

The book is divided into five parts:

- Technology and the Preconditions of Industrial Music
- Industrial Geography
- Industrial Musical Style
- Industrial Politics
- People and Industrial Music

The foreword is written by Stephen Mallinder of first-wave industrial act Cabaret Voltaire.

== Release and reception ==
The book received a subvention by the American Musicological Society and a certificate of merit for research in rock music by the Association for Recorded Sound Collections. It attracted attention in the field of popular music studies, appearing on syllabi at Indiana University's Jacobs School of Music, New York University's Clive Davis Institute of Recorded Music, and at Ithaca College. It received favorable reviews in Popular Music, Music & Letters, Popular Music and Society, Music Theory Online, Rock Music Studies, and Choice.

In popular media, it was covered by Brainwashed, WNYC, and Keith Moliné reviewed it in The Wire. In the lead up to release, the introduction was reproduced by PopMatters.

Music site Heathen Harvest discussed the thesis at length, noting the "bulk of Reed’s book aims precisely at showing that, in fact, there are unifying elements that run through the main stages of industrial music."

The book was translated into French and published in 2018 by Éditions du Camion Blanc.
