= Seattle 2007 =

Live album by VAST
- Released: 2007
- Genre: Alternative rock
- Length: 63:57
- Label: 2blossoms

VAST chronology
Live at CBGB's (2006)	Seattle 2007 (2007)	April (2007)

Seattle 2007 is an official live recording by the band VAST and was released in 2007. It was made available as an online download.

== Track listing ==
1. "Here" – 4:43
2. "Pretty When You Cry" – 3:56
3. "Falling from the Sky" – 3:04
4. "Thrown Away" – 3:59
5. "Touched" – 4:32
6. "I Don't Have Anything" – 3:25
7. "The Last One Alive/Free" – 7:10
8. "Blue" – 4:17
9. "Desert Garden" – 3:03
10. "Tattoo of Your Name" – 3:45
11. "You're Too Young" – 3:12
12. "Flames" – 4:06
13. "Temptation" – 3:35
14. "Turquoise" – 3:22
15. "My TV and You" – 2:47
16. "Three Doors" – 5:01
