= South (EP) =

EP by Ego Likeness
- Released: 2007
- Recorded: 2007
- Genre: Darkwave, Industrial
- Label: Self-Released

Ego Likeness chronology
| Water to the Dead (2007) | South (2007) | West (2009) |

South is the fifth album by Ego Likeness and is the first in their Compass EP series. It was self-released in 2007 and was available for purchase only at tour locations or through their website. Only 300 copies were pressed and were individually numbered and autographed. According to the official website, the album is sold out but the songs are to be rereleased at a later date.

== Track listing ==
1. "South"
2. "Second Skin" (2007)
3. "Burn, Witch Burn" (Angelspit Remix)
4. "Aviary" (e.a. rowe Remix)
5. "Funny Olde World"
