= North (EP) =

EP by Ego Likeness
- Released: 2009
- Recorded: 2009
- Genre: Darkwave, Industrial
- Label: Self-Released

Ego Likeness chronology
| West (2008) | North (2009) | Breedless (2010) |

North is the seventh album by Ego Likeness and is the third in their Compass EP series. It was self-released in 2009 and was available for purchase only at tour locations or through their website. Only 300 copies were pressed and were individually numbered and autographed. According to the official website, the songs are to be rereleased at a later date.

== Track listing ==
1. "North"
2. "The Neverending Story (The Dark Clan)"
3. "Weave" (Anathema Device Remix)
4. "Raise Your Red Flags" (The Machine in the Garden Remix)
5. "Down by the Water"
