= Turquoise & Crimson =

Studio album by VAST
- Released: 2002–2004 (online version); 2006 (retail version)
- Recorded: 2001–2002 in Santa Fe, New Mexico
- Genres: Alternative rock; industrial rock
- Length: 1:11:30 (online version); 1:18:12 (retail version)
- Label: 2blossoms
- Producer: Jon Crosby

VAST chronology
Music for People (2000)	Turquoise & Crimson (2002)	Nude (2004)

VAST chronology
A Complete Demonstration (2005)	Turquoise & Crimson (retail) (2006)	April (2006)

Turquoise 3.x online release cover

Crimson 3.x online release cover

Turquoise & Crimson is a 2006 album by VAST, collecting tracks from the EPs Turquoise 3.x and Crimson 3.x that were released as mp3s online between 2002 and 2004 through the band's website. After the two EPs were released, many of the songs found their way onto the major-label backed album Nude with different mixes before finding their way onto the official double album release. There are two versions of Turquoise & Crimson — an official online version and an official "final" version released to retail.

The physical double-album, the band's fourth album, was released in 2006 under Jon Crosby's 2blossoms record label. The two discs contain re-mastered versions of the tracks found on the online release and the major-label release of Nude, albeit in different mixes and with different production. The track listing is slightly different than the online version. Crosby said the retail version is the official final version of the album.

The album also has its own specialized album cover, different from the cover art released for the Turquoise 3.x and Crimson 3.x releases, which each had their own album artwork.

== Background ==
The songs for the release were created during and after a short four-year hiatus instituted by Jon Crosby so he could do some "soul-searching". Many of the songs reflect the rough time in Crosby's life after the release of Music for People and the split between himself and a major-label.

The songs on the online release are the same versions as the retail CD; however, production and sound quality on the retail version is of higher quality.

== Reception ==
Professional ratings
Review scores
Source	Rating
AllMusic	3/5 stars

AllMusic noted the shift in tone since VAST was no longer on a major label, giving the album a 3 out of 5 and calling it "essential for VAST fans", but noting that its largest problem was Crosby's vocal style.

== Track listings ==
All songs written by Jon Crosby.

=== Turquoise 3.x EP ===
1. "Turquoise" – 3:19
2. "Ecstasy" – 3:29
3. "Be With Me" – 3:53
4. "Thrown Away" – 4:00
5. "Don't Take Your Love Away" – 4:53
6. "Falling from the Sky" – 3:05
7. "Candle" – 4:01
8. "I Woke Up L.A." – 3:30
9. "I Can't Say No (To You)" – 4:12
10. "Desert Garden" – 3:17

=== Crimson 3.x EP ===
1. "I Need to Say Goodbye" – 3:23
2. "Lost" – 2:37
3. "Winter in My Heart" – 3:36
4. "All I Found Was You (Japanese Fantasy)" – 3:25
5. "That's My Boy" – 3:54
6. "Evil Little Girl" – 3:59
7. "Beautiful" – 3:33
8. "Señorita" – 2:50
9. "Where It Never Rains" – 3:30
10. "Goodbye" – 3:04

=== Retail album ===
Disc 1

1. "Turquoise" – 3:19
2. "Ecstasy" – 3:29
3. "Be With Me" – 3:53
4. "Thrown Away" – 4:00
5. "Don't Take Your Love Away" – 4:53
6. "Falling from the Sky" – 3:05
7. "Candle" – 4:01
8. "I Woke Up L.A." – 3:30
9. "I Can't Say No (To You)" – 4:12
10. "Desert Garden" – 3:17

Disc 2

1. "Dead Angels" – 3:25
2. "I Need to Say Goodbye" – 3:23
3. "Lost" – 2:37
4. "Winter in My Heart" – 3:36
5. "All I Found Was You (Japanese Fantasy)" – 3:25
6. "That's My Boy" – 3:54
7. "Evil Little Girl" – 3:59
8. "Beautiful" – 3:33
9. "Señorita" – 2:50
10. "Where It Never Rains" – 3:30
11. "Bruise" – 3:17
12. "Goodbye" – 3:04
