= Popgefahr =

Studio album by De/Vision
- Released: 19 March 2010
- Genre: Synthpop
- Length: 47:38 (Standard Edition)
- Label: Popgefahr Records
- Producer: De/Vision, Schumann & Bach

De/Vision chronology
Noob (2007)	Popgefahr (2010)

Popgefahr is the eleventh album by German synth-pop band De/Vision, released in 2010. It was the first album released under their own label Popgefahr Records. "Rage" and "Time to Be Alive" were released digitally as a double A-side single on March 5, 2010.

De/Vision previewed all tracks on their Myspace site right in the weeks before the release of the album.

== Track listings ==
=== Standard Edition ===
Popgefahr – Standard Edition
No.	Title	Length
1.	"mAndroids"	3:51
2.	"Rage"	4:01
3.	"What's Love All About"	5:42
4.	"Time to Be Alive"	4:59
5.	"Plastic Heart"	4:26
6.	"Be a Light to Yourself"	4:27
7.	"Ready to Die"	4:45
8.	"Flash of Life"	5:25
9.	"Twisted Story"	4:32
10.	"Until the End of Time"	6:32

iTunes Bonus track
No.	Title	Length
11.	"Free World"	5:45

=== Limited Fanbox edition ===
The album was also released as a digipak in a box, together with a promo single CD, USB-stick and other gimmicks.

Popgefahr – Limited Fanbox Edition Disc 2
No.	Title	Length
1.	"Rage _{(Radio Cut)}"	3:34
2.	"Time to Be Alive _{(Radio Edit)}"	3:44
3.	"Rage _{(Extended Club Version)}"	5:11

Popgefahr – Limited Fanbox Edition USB-stick
No.	Title	Length
1.	"What You Deserve _{(Giant Killer Mix)}"	5:10
2.	"Life Is Suffering _{Adaptor Remix)}"	5:50
3.	"Addict _{(Lars Hausmann Remix)}"	5:43
4.	"Star-Crossed Lovers _{(Lost in Space Mix)}"	6:10
5.	"Still Unknown _{(Rude Funka Mix)}"	4:37
6.	"My Own Worst Enemy _{(Intuition's US Radio Edit)}"	4:08
7.	"Obey Your Heart _{(Handheld Mix)}"	6:11
8.	"Life Is Suffering _{(ENC Remix)}"	4:35
9.	"Rage _{(What Goes Up Must Come Down Mix)}"	3:47

== Personnel ==
- Steffen Keth - vocals
- Thomas Adam - keyboards, backing vocals
