= VAST =

American alternative rock band

- Origin: Petaluma, California, U.S.
- Genres: Alternative rock; industrial rock; experimental rock; alternative metal
- Years active: 1996–present
- Labels: 2blossoms; Elektra
- Members: Jon Crosby; Michael Cry; Ben Fenton; Tabber Millard; Ernesto J. Ponce; Elina Niemela
- Past members: Thomas Froggatt; Steve Clark; Rowan Robertson; Justin Cotta; Patrick McGuire; M.D. Miller; Jerry Rehn; Dustin Williams
- Website: www.realvast.com

VAST is an American alternative rock band formed in Petaluma, California, in 1996. The acronym VAST stands for Visual Audio Sensory Theater and the band is the main creation of singer/songwriter and multi-instrumentalist Jon Crosby. The band is signed to 2blossoms, an independent record company created by Crosby.

VAST's sound is identifiable as ambient electro-rock with considerable industrial and acoustic influences, usually made with Crosby's traditional acoustic guitar, electronic instruments and processing, drum-driven tracks, and heavy bass. Vocally similarities range from classic rock to post-grunge. In recent years, however, VAST's sound has been more identifiable with acoustic rock in releases such as April and Me and You. The band's latest release is 2018's She Is Murder EP

== History ==
=== Early years ===
Crosby's musical endeavors began at the age of 13, where he was noted in Guitar Player Magazine as a promising guitarist of the future. Growing up, Crosby spent his teen years in Humboldt County, California. He often recorded home demos with nothing more than a guitar and a drum machine, sometimes a bass player with him as well. He nearly signed with Shrapnel, a guitar-based label, but turned it down to work on his budding songwriting skills. Crosby eventually left Rancho Cotate High School in Rohnert Park, California, to do home study and begin his own band, which he dubbed VAST. Much like fellow alternative rock/industrial band Nine Inch Nails, Crosby was the only member but found a touring band who knew the songs well enough to play with him live.

After sending multiple demo tapes to nearby radio stations in his home state of California, the band got a contract with Elektra Records. VAST released a teaser of their upcoming debut album Visual Audio Sensory Theater, titled VAST Is..., which featured the first four tracks of the album. The track "Touched" received considerable amounts of airplay on local radio stations before capturing the attention of a mainstream audience, when it was featured in the Dana Brown surfing film Step into Liquid. It also received exposure when it was played briefly in the trailer for the movie The Beach (even though the song never made it to the actual soundtrack). NBC also used it as a promo song during TV show advertisements.

After Visual Audio Sensory Theater, Elektra pressured Crosby to go back to the drawing board and craft an album that was accessible to more listeners, but still retaining the distinct sound of the last album. After two years of recording, VAST returned with 2000's Music for People. The album featured a more rock-oriented sound, and benefited from major-label funding by allowing Crosby to work with the New Bombay Recording Orchestra in India. Turmoil was abundant during the album's recording and rehearsal process as Crosby constantly fought with record executives over the music's direction and former backup guitarist Rowan Robertson wishing to leave VAST to begin his own solo career. By the end of the album's recording process, Robertson had left VAST, and Crosby reluctantly moved forward with the band. Music for People provided the band with MTV airplay through their lead single "Free"'s music video, with the single charting on the Billboard's Hot 100, and hitting No. 2 on the Modern Rock Tracks. The band became a relative success after Music for People, but the album's poor sales and lack of a second charting single led to tension between Elektra and Crosby. In late 2002, Elektra terminated VAST's contract.

=== Turquoise and Crimson years (2001–2005) ===
In 2004, Crosby recorded bundles of tracks that were titled Turquoise 3.x and Crimson 3.x; they were released through an online electronic delivery outlet. Crosby solidified his band's line-up during this time, and from then on, VAST became a four-person band. With the unusual method of distribution of these tracks by a band with a relatively large fanbase formerly signed to a major label, many record companies were outraged with the releases. As a result, from pressure from his former label, Elektra, Crosby was forced to sign a short-term deal with Carson Daly-owned independent label 456 Entertainment to release the best of both bundles as one album, titled Nude. This release also had the most high-quality versions of the songs, as the online releases were only available via mp3. In later years, Crosby said the idea of releasing Nude on an indie label was a "nightmare" because "There were so many problems dealing with them (456 Entertainment) on every level. I feel we made a big mistake not believing in ourselves enough and doing it on our own."

=== 2blossoms years (2005–2009) ===
After a short tour for Nude, the band released 2blossoms's first release, A Complete Demonstration, which was a collection of early demo tracks during the Visual Audio sessions. The album was a limited-edition piece and sold quickly due to popular demand. Then in 2006, VAST released Turquoise & Crimson, a double-disc collection of all the tracks that were released as bundles online in 2004 online under his label. Originally it was only available through the 2blossoms website, but it was later released to retail stores. During the tour for the double album, VAST played at CBGB's, and, in late 2006, released Live at CBGB's on their 2blossoms record to moderate sales. After multiple tours, VAST went back to the studio and recorded their first all-acoustic album, April.

The release method for April was, once again, unorthodox. In 2006, Crosby released an online version of the acoustic album online with ten tracks. April was mostly recorded only by Crosby and an acoustic guitar, with minimal use of bass and drums. After the online release, Crosby said he was unhappy with it and went back to the studio to add four new tracks and a whole new track listing. The cover featured fan-made artwork, and the album received a traditional release in stores. The album was not as well received by critics and fans, but was modestly embraced. Crosby later said that he only had it in him to do one album like April, and that it was his favorite VAST album.

Crosby also released a span of solo albums entitled Generica with him and an acoustic guitar throughout 2007 and 2008, culminating in a collection in 2009. The music would later find its way onto VAST albums being reworked into a full-band setting on future release Me and You.

Despite an expected documentary entitled Closed Romantic Realism, 2008 saw the release of an EP for Crosby's science fiction novel Bang Band SiXXX. The EP, containing six songs, is closely related to his older music with lots of electronics leading the music instead of acoustic guitars. Crosby claims it is a return to his older, darker sound. The EP is entitled Bang Band SiXXX: Relay EP. Many of the songs have become live staples at shows.

In May 2009, Crosby released Me and You and a North American tour in support of the album. Me and You contains songs from Crosby's Generica series reworked into a full-band setting. Crosby also is planning on launching a release of the album in which you can purchase the album and allow the proceeds to go to a charity of the purchaser's choice. Me and You is currently only released through retail.

=== Making Evening And Night (2013–2014) ===
From October 2013, through the official VAST Facebook account, Crosby put out a total of five "Works In Progress". Fans were encouraged to vote on their favorite tracks in a similar nature to the release of Turquoise & Crimson in 2003. "Works In Progress 1" featured three new demo tracks: "Again And Again", "Noise" and "Where'd You Go". "Works In Progress 2" featured five new demo tracks: "They Only Love You When You Die", "Kimi", "Fire Of Love", "Desperate" and "I Want It Back". "Works In Progress 3" featured four new demo tracks: "Diamonds To Coal", "Burning Desire", "The Thing They Took" and "Something About You Turns Me On". "Works In Progress 4" featured four new demo tracks: "Call On Me", "Broken Girl", "Like God" and "Put Your Lips Around My Generation". The fifth and final installment, "Works In Progress 5", featured six new demo tracks: "Trail Of Tears", "Whisper My Name In Your Heart", "There Is No Tomorrow", "It's Time", "I Would Like It", and "No One Could Know".

Of all these demo tracks, "Like God" had previously been released in the same demo form in 2005 as part of the official VAST fan club package, "No One Could Know" had been played live in 2009, and "Whisper My Name In Your Heart" was played live in 2009 under the working title of "This Love Song".

The outcome of this project culminated in the release of Making Evening and Night — a double album with disc 1 featuring all the songs the fans voted for, and the second disc featuring the rest. A finished version of this album is yet to be released.

=== Stripped Series (2015–2016) ===
Late 2015 and early 2016 have seen the releases of Stripped/Black, Stripped/Red and Stripped/Blue; a five-part collection of VAST songs all done acoustically.

Stripped/Orange was released on August 28, 2016. Unlike the other albums in the Stripped series, this album includes bass guitar, electric guitar, djembe, percussion and other vocal overdubs, to create a full sounding recording. A standard, acoustic version was also released. It has also come to be known as “Peeled Orange”.

Although intended to be a five-part series, Stripped/Violet was released in December 2016, with Jon going on to say: "I felt like something was missing from the "Stripped" series. All songs I wrote before the first VAST album ended up ignored. They are a little raw because I wrote them between 16 and 18 years old, but I feel they are an important part of my body of work." Five of the songs on this album are previously unreleased.

=== Black Magic (2017–2018) ===
2017 saw the release of Jon's second publication, Ruminations On Everything, a non-fiction work, also released in audiobook format. They Only Love You When You Die EP followed, with a music video for the song announced but remains unreleased. The next two EPs released were Here I Am and Little Darling. The fourth was In Lieu Of Flowers.

November 2017 also saw the release of Posthumous Serenade, a two-part collection of twenty acoustic covers done by Crosby (solo) as a tribute to some of his favorite musicians who have died. Artists include Joy Division, Prince and Johnny Cash, among many others.

In March 2018, it was announced that the next VAST album proper will be called Black Magic. "She Is Murder" will be the first single lifted from the album, and its music video has been officially posted online.

On April 22, 2018, the official VAST shop website announced the track listing for Black Magic, as well as two other releases: a limited edition EP for the song "She Is Murder," along with a follow-up to the Jon Crosby solo release Posthumous Serenade titled "More Posthumous Serenades".

On April 24, 2018, The VAST Companion was made available for pre-order, a book detailing the stories behind VAST songs: "The book goes into where he [Jon] was when he wrote them, what went into making them, and the stories behind each song. Written with humor, introspection, and tenderness, this book will entertain VAST fans universally with anecdotes and stories behind over 100 songs."

Throughout 2018 the four EPs from the previous year were reissued on CD and bundled together. Many of these songs were later compiled for the digital release of the She is Murder EP.

As of February 2025, Black Magic has not released and is yet to have an official release date announced.

== Media appearances ==
- The English dub of Blue Gender featured songs from Visual Audio Sensory Theater.
- "One More Day" was featured on Smallville Season 7 Episode 15 "Veritas", and "Don't Take Your Love Away" was featured on Smallville Season 8 Episode 20 "Bride".
- The TV series Angel featured "Here", "Dirty Hole", "Temptation", and "I'm Dying" for the promotional material design to help launch the series and "Touched" in the episode "Lonely Hearts".
- "Flames" was featured in the films Sommersturm (International title: Summer Storm) and After Sex.
- Professional wrestler A.J. Styles used "Touched" as his entrance music in Ring of Honor. The song was later sampled in another entrance music used by Styles, "Demi-Gods" by the Lab Rats feat. Slim Jim.
- "Thrown Away" was featured on One Tree Hill Season 1 Episode 21 "The Leaving Song".

== Discography ==
=== Studio albums ===
- Visual Audio Sensory Theater (1998) Elektra
- Music for People (2000) Elektra
- Nude (2004) 456 Entertainment / SPV
- Turquoise & Crimson (2006) 2blossoms
- April (2007) 2blossoms
- Me and You (2009) 2blossoms
- Making Evening and Night (2014) 747audioworks
- Black Magic (2018)

=== Other releases ===
- Live in Seattle: Acoustic at Tower Records (2004) Online-release
- Turquoise & Crimson (online version) (2004) Self-released
- A Complete Demonstration (2005) 2blossoms
- April (online version) (2006) 2blossoms
- Live at CBGB's (2006) 2blossoms
- Seattle 2007 (2007) 2blossoms
- Live In Chicago (2008) 2blossoms
- Live In NYC (2011) 2blossoms
- Stripped/Black (2015) Self-released
- Stripped/Red (2015) Self-released
- Stripped/Blue (2016) Self-released
- Stripped/Orange (2016) Self-released
- Stripped/Orange (Overdub Version) (2016) Self-released (also known as Peeled Orange)
- Stripped/Green (2016) Self-released
- Stripped/Violet (2016) Self-released
- They Only Love You When You Die (EP) (2017) Self-released
- Here I Am (EP) (2017) Self-released
- Little Darling (EP) (2017) Self-released
- In Lieu Of Flowers (EP) (2018) Self-released
- She Is Murder (EP) (2018) Self-released

=== Solo work and side projects ===
==== Jon Crosby ====
Solo:

- Generica Vol. I (2007)
- Generica Vol. II (2008)
- Generica Vol. III (2008)
- Ruminations On Everything (2017) (Non-Fiction Publication/Audiobook)
- Posthumous Serenade (2017) (2-Disc Covers Album)
- More Posthumous Serenades (2018) (Covers Album)
- The VAST Companion (2018) (Non-fiction publication - stories behind VAST songs)

Jon Crosby and the Resonator Band:

- Generica Vol. IV (2008)
- Generica Vol. V (2008)

==== Bang Band SiXXX ====
- Bang Band SiXXX: Relay EP (2009)
