= Lauren E. Simonutti =

American artist

Lauren E. Simonutti (1968–2012) was an American photographer. Simonutti was known for her elaborately staged black and white self portraits. Her images were created entirely from traditional photographic techniques Her work is included in the collections of the Whitney Museum of American Art, The Metropolitan Museum Of Art, and the Milwaukee Art Museum.

Simonutti was born in Morristown, NJ and graduated from the University Of Arts, Philadelphia in 1990 with a BFA in photography.
