= Music for People (album) =

Studio album by VAST
- Released: September 12, 2000
- Recorded: 2000 in Los Angeles, California
- Genre: Alternative rock, alternative metal
- Length: 40:30
- Label: Elektra
- Producer: Jon Crosby, Blumpy

VAST chronology
Visual Audio Sensory Theater (1998)	Music for People (2000)	Turquoise & Crimson (Online Version) (2004)

Singles from Music for People
- 1. "Free" Released: 2000

Music for People is the second album by the band VAST, released on September 12, 2000, by Elektra Records. It would be VAST's last album on Elektra Records. After the success of VAST's debut album, Music for People could only produce one successful single, "Free", which gained major MTV exposure. However, after the mixed success of the album, VAST and Elektra Records parted ways over disappointing sales and differing views on the future of the band.

== Track listing ==
All songs written by Jon Crosby.

1. "The Last One Alive" – 3:38
2. "Free" – 3:07
3. "I Don't Have Anything" – 3:46
4. "The Gates of Rock 'N' Roll" – 3:24
5. "What Else Do I Need" – 3:37
6. "Blue" – 3:25
7. "Land of Shame" – 3:26
8. "A Better Place" – 3:23
9. "Song Without a Name" – 3:32
10. "We Will Meet Again" – 3:39
11. "My TV and You" – 2:40
12. "Lady of Dreams" – 2:53

== Reception ==
Professional ratings
Review scores
Source	Rating
AllMusic	4/5 stars
Select	1/5 medals

AllMusic gave the album a four out of five, stating the album "is bizarre and beautiful in capturing social apathy." Select gave the album a negative review of one out of five, opining that the album was a "long-winded metal opus" and felt its content was closer to the band Babybird than Metallica or Jane's Addiction.
