= Book arts =

Book arts may refer to:

- Book art (fine art), a field of study within fine art
- Artist's book, a work of art in the form of a book
- Book design, the art of designing a book
- Book illustration, illustration in a book
- Bookbinding, the process of creating a book
