= Hideous and Perfect =

Studio album by Angelspit
- Released: September 9, 2009
- Recorded: 2009
- Genre: Electro-industrial
- Length: 46:58
- Label: Black Pill Red Pill, Metropolis
- Producer: ZooG, Destroyx

Angelspit chronology
| Black Kingdom Red Kingdom (2009) | Hideous and Perfect (2009) | Larva Pupa Tank Coffin (2010) |

Hideous and Perfect is the third studio album by Australian electro-industrial band Angelspit. Released on 9 September 2009, it marks the shortest time between two consecutive Angelspit albums, with Blood Death Ivory being released in 2008. A music video for "Fuck the Revolution" was released. On 10 October 2010 a remix album entitled Larva Pupa Tank Coffin was released featuring four new songs and remixes by both Angelspit themselves as well as other artists. Also released along with the album was a music video for the song "Sleep Now". A second remix album, Carbon Beauty, was released 8 March 2011, featuring three new songs and nine remixes.

== Track listing ==
All tracks are written by ZooG, Destroyx

| No. | Title | Length |
|---|---|---|
| 1. | "Ditch the Rest" | 3:51 |
| 2. | "Cold Hard Cash" | 4:06 |
| 3. | "Fink" | 3:44 |
| 4. | "Fuck the Revolution" | 3:55 |
| 5. | "On Earth" | 1:15 |
| 6. | "Making Money" | 4:38 |
| 7. | "Sleep Now" | 4:33 |
| 8. | "Channel Hell" | 4:00 |
| 9. | "Let Them Eat Distortion" | 3:36 |
| 10. | "Hyperlust" | 4:20 |
| 11. | "Princess Chaos" | 3:35 |
| 12. | "As It Is In Heaven" | 5:58 |
| Total length: | | 46:58 |
