= Visual Audio Sensory Theater =

Studio album by VAST
- Released: April 28, 1998
- Recorded: 1997–1998 in Los Angeles, California
- Genre: Electro-rock
- Length: 51:29
- Label: Elektra
- Producer: Fred Maher; Jon Crosby

VAST chronology
VAST Is... (1998)	Visual Audio Sensory Theater (1998)	Music for People (2000)

Visual Audio Sensory Theater is the debut album by the band VAST, released on April 28, 1998, by Elektra Records. The album mixed samples of Benedictine monks of the Abbey of Saint-Maur and Le Mystère Des Voix Bulgares, with an 18-piece orchestra, guitars, and electronics.

Jon Crosby originally signed onto Elektra Records when he was only 17, and recorded his demo EP, VAST Is... which featured certain songs to be featured on their debut in an unfinished form. He also traveled across the world and recorded demos of world choirs that he used in various songs on the album, which gave the album its trademark world-music theme.

The first single released from the album was "Pretty When You Cry". Led by a supporting music video, it gained modest success on the music charts. However, the band's and the album's popularity didn't skyrocket until the second single, "Touched", was featured in a film soundtrack and the music video was put in play on MTV. No other singles were released for the disc, and "Touched" is still VAST's most famous song, it being featured in the Angel soundtrack, Angel: Live Fast, Die Never, the companion CD to the Everworld book series, and as a song featured in WrestleMania XXV. The track also appears in the movie The Beach but is not featured in the soundtrack.

Other album tracks featured in various media include "Pretty When You Cry" played during the end credits of the German film We are the night and is included in its soundtrack CD; "Flames", which was used in the German film Summer Storm; and "Here", which has been used in two episodes of Angel. The songs "Here", "Dirty Hole", "I'm Dying", and "Temptation" were also used in the unaired pitch video for Angel. "Touched" contains elements of the song "Pilentze Pee", sung by the Bulgarian State Television Female Vocal Choir. "Touched" was featured in the surfing film Step into Liquid.

== Reception ==
Professional ratings
Review scores
Source	Rating
AllMusic	3/5 stars

AllMusic said that "the rich textures created here are quite impressive," and gave the album 3 stars out of 5.

== Track listing ==
All songs written by Jon Crosby.

Visual Audio Sensory Theater track listing
No.	Title	Length
1.	"Here"	4:56
2.	"Touched"	3:57
3.	"Dirty Hole"	5:36
4.	"Pretty When You Cry"	3:50
5.	"I'm Dying"	4:09
6.	"Flames"	4:37
7.	"Temptation"	3:09
8.	"Three Doors"	4:58
9.	"The Niles Edge"	4:35
10.	"Somewhere Else to Be"	3:05
11.	"Untitled"	3:42
12.	"You"	4:55

== Charts ==
Chart performance for Visual Audio Sensory Theater
Chart (1998)	Peak position
Australian Albums (ARIA)	30
