= Angelspit =

Australian electronic band

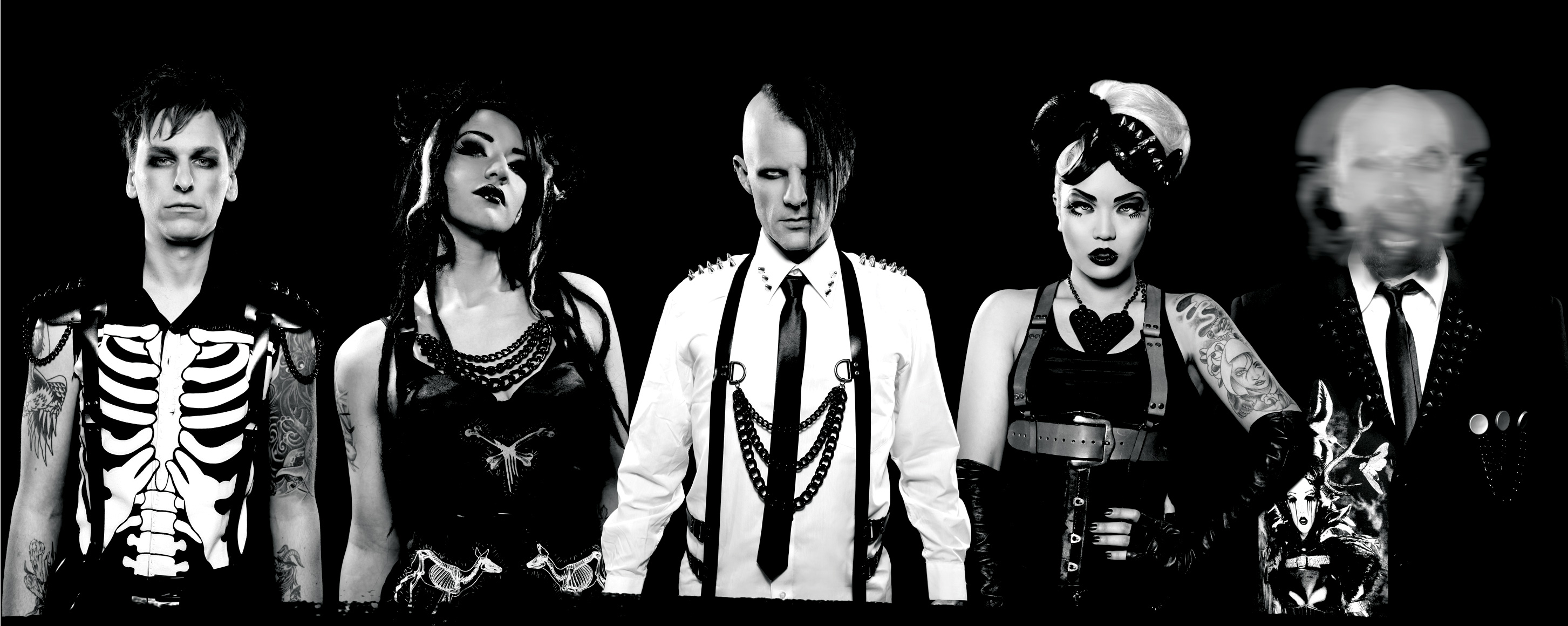
- The band in 2011

Background information
- Origin: Sydney, New South Wales, Australia
- Genres: Electro-industrial, industrial rock, electropunk, cybergoth, electronica
- Years active: 2003–present
- Labels: Black Pill Red Pill; Crash Frequency; Dancing Ferret Discs; Metropolis
- Members: Zoog Von Rock; Matt Slegel; Kitsu Noir; The Liar
- Past members: George Bikos; Valerie Gentile; Chris Kling; Destroyx
- Website: angelspit.net

Angelspit is an Australian electronic music band originally from Sydney and currently based in Los Angeles. The band was formed in 2004 by vocalists/synthesists Destroyx (Amelia Tan) and ZooG (Karl Learmont). The band's music combines stylistic elements of horror, punk, pop and electronic music. Their work contains imagery revolving around medical experiments and grotesque societies. Angelspit has toured with Angel Theory, Ayria, Ikon, KMFDM, Tankt and The Crüxshadows, and have also shared the stage with bands such as The Sisters of Mercy, Nitzer Ebb, Skinny Puppy and Front Line Assembly. They performed with Lords of Acid during a 22-date U.S. tour in March 2011 and toured the United States with Blood on the Dance Floor in October 2011.

== History ==
Karl Learmont (ZooG) and Amelia Tan (Destroyx) met on an online zine forum. They shared an interest in zines and started the distro Vox Populis in 2002. They then started making zines for themselves which became the lyrical inspiration for releases to follow. Angelspit was formed in 2003, and the duo then self-released their debut EP, Nurse Grenade on 3 October 2004.

The band self-released their debut studio album, Krankhaus on 6 June 2006, and re-released it on 30 January 2007 with a bonus remix album, entitled Surgically Atoned, and in the US on Dancing Ferret Discs. The album featured remixes by Combichrist and Ego Likeness. A video for "Vena Cava" was released on 22 August 2007. The band toured Australia, the US and Europe where they lived in Berlin to record their second studio album, Blood Death Ivory.

The band released their second studio album, Blood Death Ivory on 11 June 2008. The album was written and recorded between 2006 and 2008. Again, the band continued to tour the new material around Europe and the US. They released their debut remix album Black Kingdom Red Kingdom on 15 May 2009. Around this time the band began to produce "Blipverts", short video blogs and tutorials on various topics, including the production of the band's third studio album.

The band released their third studio album, Hideous and Perfect on 9 September 2009. A video for "Fuck the Revolution" was released on 28 September 2009. They released their second remix album Larva Pupa Tank Coffin on 10 October 2010. Larva Pupa Tank Coffin includes 4 brand new Angelspit tracks and remixes by the band themselves as well as other artists. A video for the remix of "Sleep Now" was released on 2 October 2010. They released their third remix album, Carbon Beauty on 8 March 2011. This new remix album contains 3 new tracks as well as 10 remixes of tracks from the Hideous and Perfect album. A video for "Toxic Girl" was released on 13 April 2011, and a video for "Like It? Lick It!" was released on 27 July 2011.

In April 2011, Angelspit announced the addition of three new members: guitarist Valerie Gentile (Black Tape for a Blue Girl, The Crüxshadows), drummer Chris Kling (Hanzel und Gretyl, Mortiis) and videojammer The Liar. The new line-up of Angelspit released their fourth studio album, Hello My Name Is on 11 October 2011. Matt James replaced Chris Kling in early 2012, and former Crüxshadows guitarist George Bikos filled in for Valerie Gentile on the band's 2012 tour. On 23 March 2014, Angelspit announced Destroyx was taking time off to focus on her other projects and would be re-joining Angelspit on future recordings. She has now started a solo career under the name Amelia Arsenic.

Angelspit, now a four-piece led by ZooG (now known as Zoog Von Rock), has released two further albums - Cult of Fake in 2016 and Black Dog Bite in 2017 - while continuing to run their label Black Pill Red Pill. Zoog has also started a Patreon where he offers tips to aspiring musicians.

== Band members ==
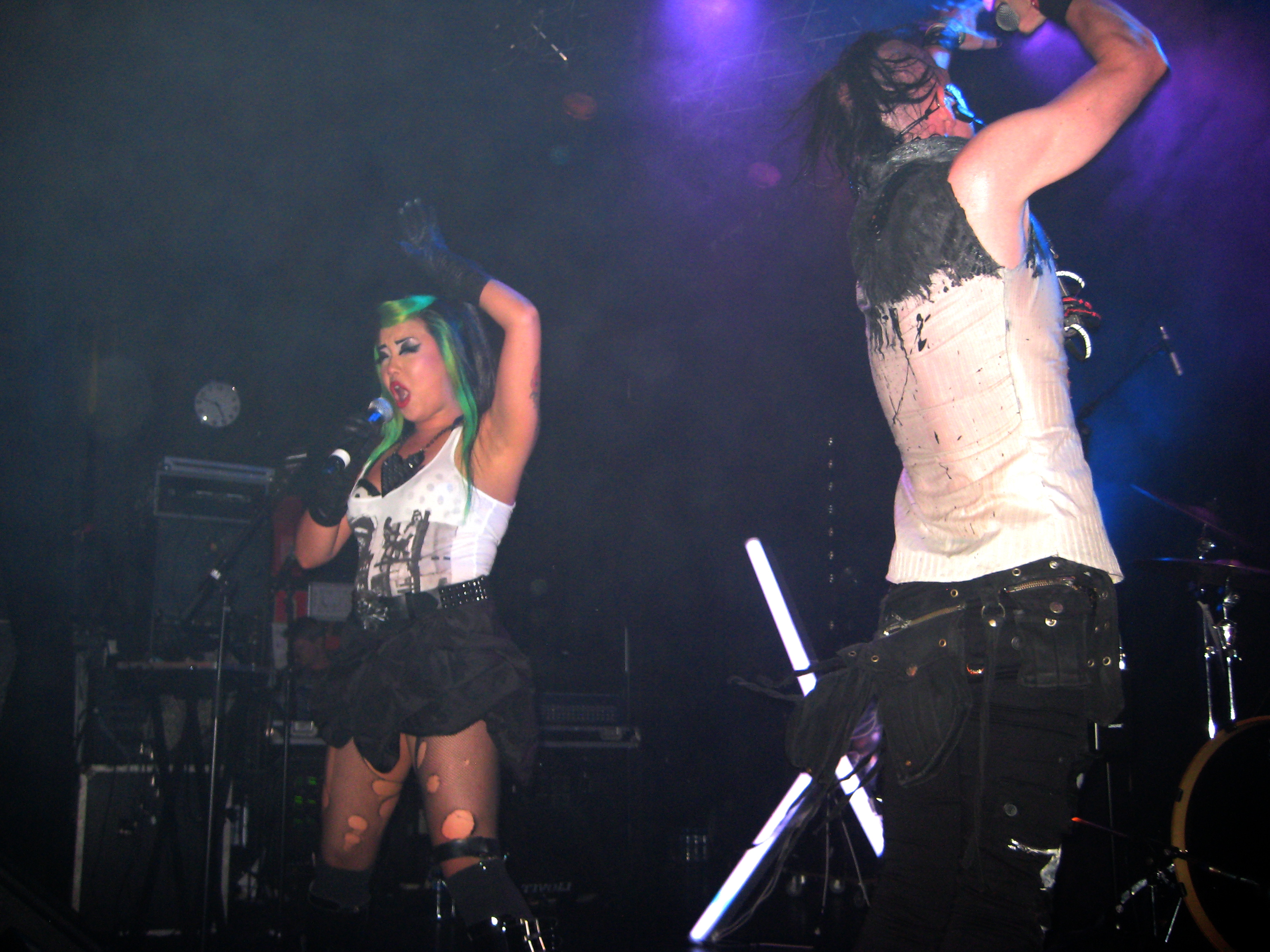
Angelspit performing in the Netherlands, 2011

=== Current members ===
- Zoog Von Rock (formerly ZooG) – vocals, programming (2003–present)
- The Liar – video manipulation (2010–present)
- Matt Slegel – guitars, bass (2017–present; live contributor 2016)
- Kitsu Noir – drums (2017–present)

=== Former members ===
- Amelia Arsenic (formerly Destroyx) – vocals (2003–2013)
- Chris Kling – drums (2011–2012; session musician 2014)
- Valerie Gentile – guitars, bass (2011–2012)
- George Bikos – guitars, bass (2012–2016; session musician 2008, 2009, 2017)
- Nick Delavega – programming, keyboards (2016; live contributor 2015)
- AJ Gapsevic – guitars, bass (2016)
- Lorelei – vocals (2016)

=== Live contributors ===
- Peter Crane – keyboards (2007)
- Roberto Massaglia – keyboards (2007)
- John Von Ahlen – engineer (2007)
- Matt James – drums (2012)
- Miss Ballistic – vocals (2013; session musician 2014)
- Dita von Cheats – synthesizer (2013)

=== Session musicians ===
- Graeme Charles Kent – guitars, bass (2004–2011, 2017)
- Bradley R. Bills – drums (2014)
- Alex Weaver – vocals (2014)

== Discography ==
Angelspit discography
- Studio albums: 10
- Extended plays: 2
- Live albums: 1
- Compilation albums: 2
- Singles: 1
- Video albums: 1
- Music videos: 11
- Remix albums: 12

=== Studio albums ===
Title	Album details
Krankhaus	Released: 6 June 2006; Formats: CD, DD, USB; Label: Crash Frequency
Blood Death Ivory	Released: 11 June 2008; Format: CD, DD, USB; Label: Crash Frequency
Hideous and Perfect	Released: 9 September 2009; Format: CD, digital download, USB; Label: Black Pill Red Pill (02)
Hello My Name Is	Released: 11 October 2011; Format: CD, DD, USB; Label: Metropolis (MET 750)
The Product	Released: 11 March 2014; Format: CD, DD, USB; Label: Black Pill Red Pill (BPRP03)
Cult of Fake	Released: 6 June 2016; Format: CD, DD, USB; Label: Negative Gain (NGP82501), Black Pill Red Pill (BPRP10)
Black Dog Bite	Released: 17 October 2017; Format: CD, DD, LP, USB; Label: Dark Star Fusion, Black Pill Red Pill (BPRP15)
Bang Operative	Released: 9 September 2019; Format: CD, MP3; Label: Black Pill Red Pill
The Ignorance Cartel	Released: 16 October 2020; Format: CD, MP3; Label: Black Pill Red Pill
Diesel Priest	Released: 3 December 2021; Formats: CD, MP3; Label: Black Pill Red Pill
The Bastard Gods	Release: July 24, 2023 (Bandcamp, MP3), August 21, 2023 (CD/USB), November 2023 (VINYL/TAPE); Formats: MP3, CD, USB, VINYL, TAPE; Label: Black Pill Red Pill
Red End	Release: August 7, 2025 (Bandcamp, MP3), August 22, 2025 (CD); Formats: MP3, CD; Label: Black Pill Red Pill

=== Live albums ===
Title	Album details
Angelspit Live 2009	Released: 6 April 2012; Formats: Digital download, USB; Label: Black Pill Red Pill

=== Compilation albums ===
Title	Album details
USB Spit Pill Overdose	Released: 6 April 2012; Formats: USB; Label: Black Pill Red Pill
Rarities	Released: 6 April 2012; Formats: USB; Label: Black Pill Red Pill

=== Remix albums ===
Title	Album details
Surgically Atoned	Released: 30 January 2007; Formats: Digital download, USB; Label: Dancing Ferret
Black Kingdom Red Kingdom	Released: 15 May 2009; Formats: CD, digital download, USB; Label: Black Pill Red Pill (01)
Larva Pupa Tank Coffin	Released: 10 October 2010; Format: CD, digital download, USB; Label: Metropolis (MET682)
Carbon Beauty	Released: 8 March 2011; Format: CD, digital download, USB; Label: Metropolis (MET703)
Sweet Chemical Boy	Released: 16 March 2012; Format: Digital download; Label: Self-released
Re//Fibrillator	Released: 16 May 2012; Format: Digital download, USB; Label: Metropolis (MET 823D)
The Recall	Released: 11 October 2015; Format: Digital download, USB; Label: Black Pill Red Pill (BPRP05)
The Supplement	Released: 18 October 2015; Format: Digital download; Label: Black Pill Red Pill (BPRP05)
PUNCTURE MARKS	Released: 1 April 2018; Format: Digital download; Label: Black Pill Red Pill
DON’T KNOW ZERO	Released: 3 September 2021; Format: Digital download; Label: Black Pill Red Pill
KILLED ON CAMERA	Released: 10 January 2022; Format: Digital download; Label: Black Pill Red Pill
STAND IN LINE	Released: 1 April 2022; Format: Digital download; Label: Black Pill Red Pill

=== Extended plays ===
Title	Album details
Nurse Grenade	Released: 3 October 2004; Formats: CD, digital download, USB; Label: Self-released
SEQUENCE 1: GLASS JAR	Released: 13 April 2022; Formats: CD, digital download; Label: Black Pill Red Pill

=== Singles ===
Title	Year	Album
"I Know" (Halloween Mix)	2014	—N/a
"Don't Know Zero"	2021	Diesel Priest
"Killed on Camera"	2022	Diesel Priest
"Stand in Line"	2022	Diesel Priest
"All Hail the Hustle" (featuring May May Graves)	2022	Diesel Priest
"Art Imitates War"	2022	The Bastard Gods
"The Greatest Trick"	2023	The Bastard Gods
"Pay the Butcher's Bill"	2023	The Bastard Gods
"This Game is Stupid" (featuring 4th Wall)	2023	The Bastard Gods

=== Video albums ===
Title	Album details
Video Competition	Released: 6 April 2012; Formats: USB; Label: Black Pill Red Pill
The Ignorance Cartel	Released: 2020; Formats: VHS; Label: Black Pill Red Pill / VXPX

=== Music videos ===
Title	Year	Director(s)	Ref
"Vena Cava"	2007	Drew Bowie and Brad Wylie	
"Fuck the Revolution"	2009	Thomas Marcusson	
"Sleep Now"	2010	Thomas Marcusson and Stephanie Rajalingam	
"Toxic Girl"	2011	Tamas Mesmer	
"Like It? Lick It!"	2011	The Liar & Angelspit	
"Violence"	2012	Tamas Mesmer	
"Defibrillator"	2013	The Liar & Angelspit	
"Ambassador" (featuring Miss Ballistic)	2014	Chris Davis	
"Pretty Dead Boys"	2014	Keith Jenson	
"New Devil"	2016	Keith Jenson	
"Sky High"	2016	Chris Davis	
