= Jon Crosby =

American musician

- Born: July 25, 1976 (age 50); Los Angeles, California, U.S.
- Genres: Alternative rock; industrial rock; experimental rock; alternative metal
- Occupations: Singer; songwriter
- Instruments: Vocals, guitar
- Years active: 1998–present
- Labels: 2blossoms; Elektra Records

Jon Crosby (born July 25, 1976) is an American musician and founder of the musical project VAST.

== Biography ==
Crosby was born in Los Angeles, California, and grew up in Humboldt and Sonoma counties in Northern California, raised by a single mother from an upper-class family who owned a record store in Fortuna, California. His great-grandfather was John C. Crosby, a congressman from Massachusetts, and his ancestry on his mother's side is English and Native American. His father was a lounge guitarist whom he never met.

At the age of 13, he was profiled in Guitar Player magazine and Shrapnel Magazine as a rising young star. In 1993, aged 16, he moved to Petaluma, California and formed VAST with friends Mike Alioti and Dimitri Katzoff, formerly of ska band The Conspiracy, though the band line-up changed frequently thereafter. The band's early shows were mainly at the Phoenix Theater.

At 19, Crosby's manager and ex-girlfriend Sakina Sati took him to New York, along with ex-members Daniel Alva and Stephen Garver, for the purpose of shopping his demo tapes through Shiva Baum, former manager for Opiate for the Masses, and after a bidding war he signed with Elektra. Two albums were released by Elektra: Visual Audio Sensory Theater in 1998, and Music For People in 2000. In 2002, Crosby left the label. In 2003 he released two digital download albums, Turquoise 3.x and Crimson 3.x. He then moved on to Carson Daly's 456 Entertainment, releasing Nude in 2004.

In 2003, Crosby started his own record label, 2Blossoms Records & Media. In late 2007 and early 2008, Crosby released five download-only EPs, under the collective title Generica, billed as "an exploration of people, places and American music." The first three volumes were solo acoustic guitar songs, while the last two were recorded with VAST band members under the name "Jon Crosby and the Resonator Band".

== Discography ==
=== Solo ===
- Generica Vol. I (2007)
- Generica Vol. II (2008)
- Generica Vol. III (2008)
- Ruminations On Everything (2017) (Non-Fiction Publication/Audiobook)
- Posthumous Serenade (2017) (2-Disc Covers Album)
- More Posthumous Serenades (2018) (Covers Album)
- The VAST Companion (2018) (Non-fiction publication - stories behind VAST songs)

=== Jon Crosby and the Resonator Band ===
- Generica Vol. IV (2008)
- Generica Vol. V (2008)

=== Other side projects ===
- Bang Band Sixxx: Relay EP (2008)
