= S. Alexander Reed =

American academic and musician

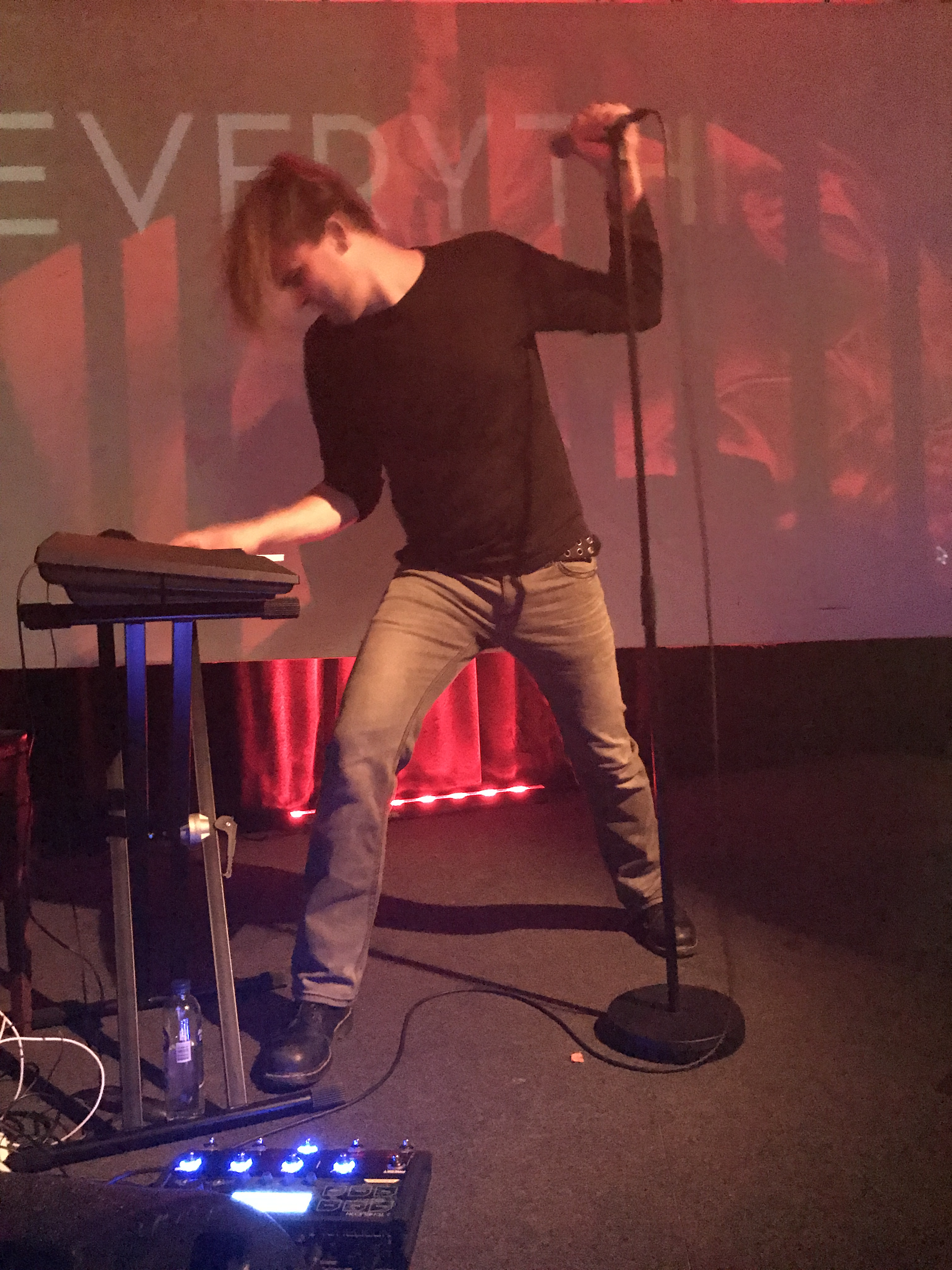
- Reed performing as Seeming in 2017
- Born: 1979 (age 46–47)
- Other name: Alexx Reed

Academic background
- Education: College of Wooster (B.Mus., B.A., 2001); University of Pittsburgh (M.A., 2003)
- Alma mater: University of Pittsburgh (Ph.D., 2005)
- Thesis: The Musical Semiotics of Timbre in the Human Voice and Static Takes Love's Body (2006)
- Doctoral advisor: Mathew Rosenblum

Academic work
- Notable works: Assimilate: A Critical History of Industrial Music (2013)
- Website: salexanderreed.com

Smith Alexander Reed is an American musicologist and musician. He was the leader of the industrial music group ThouShaltNot from 1998 to 2013, and since 2013 has led the project Seeming. As of 2026, he is a professor of music at Ithaca College. His academic works include the book Assimilate: A Critical History of Industrial Music, a co-authored 33 1/3 volume on the Flood LP by They Might Be Giants, and a monograph on Laurie Anderson's Big Science LP.

== Academic ==
He attended the College of Wooster for his undergraduate degrees. He then studied music theory and composition under Mathew Rosenblum at the University of Pittsburgh. After receiving his Ph.D. in 2005, he taught at the College of William & Mary, The University of Florida, and the Clive Davis Institute of Recorded Music at New York University. In 2013, Reed joined the faculty of Ithaca College. Reed founded the Popular Music Study Group of the American Musicological Society, and served on the board of the US branch of the International Association for the Study of Popular Music.

In 2013, Reed published Assimilate: A Critical History of Industrial Music, which received coverage in both academic and popular press, and awards from the American Musicological Society and the Association for Recorded Sound Collections. In particular, a review in Music and Letters favorably compared his writing to Andy Greenwald and Dayal Patterson.

He co-authored a book published in 2014 by Bloomsbury on the album Flood by They Might Be Giants as part of its 33 1/3 series. He published a book on the Laurie Anderson album Big Science, which was included in PopMatters's Best Books of 2022. He later gave invited lectures on Anderson at Indiana University and the Rock and Roll Hall of Fame.

Reed has published articles on harmonic progression and on works of Terry Riley and Kronos Quartet. Non-academic music publications include journalism in Slate, The Quietus, PopMatters, and McSweeney's Internet Tendency.

He has provided media commentary to CNN, NPR, and Vox.com on topics such as industrial group KMFDM and their supposed influence on mass shooters Eric Harris and Dylan Klebold, and on the lives of Genesis P-Orridge and Ozzy Osbourne.

== Music ==
Reed has stated that his first exposure to industrial music was as a preteen, from mixtapes handed down by his oldest sister. He eventually became active in the industrial scene as a performer, DJ, writer, and zine archivist. He has remixed other artists, including Alphaville, Iris, and Lunascape. His work in classical music includes having served as executive director of the Relâche ensemble.

=== ThouShaltNot ===
ThouShaltNot logo

Drummer Aaron Fuleki, who shared a dorm with Reed as freshmen at Wooster, joined ThouShaltNot shortly after its founding in 1999. Outburn reviewed their 2000 self-titled album as 91/100, praising its variety. Reed relocated to Pittsburgh in 2001 for graduate school; guitarist Jeremy David Long joined the group after Reed saw him perform with the opening band for a Faith and the Muse concert there. A second full-length, The Holiness of Now, was released in 2001 and reissued by Dancing Ferret Discs in 2003. They were a featured band at GothCon 2002 in New Orleans. The 2002 outtakes collection You'll Wake Up Yesterday included a parody of "If I Only Had a Brain" titled "If I Only Were A Goth". Dancing Ferret also released full-length albums The White Beyond in 2003 and Land Dispute in 2006. The latter album, like 2001's The Holiness of Now, featured contributions by Chris Moore.

=== Seeming ===
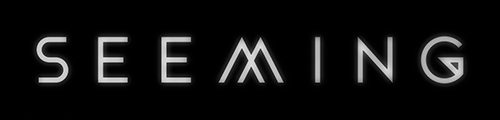
Seeming logo

With Reed's move to Ithaca, New York in 2013, ThouShaltNot disbanded, and Reed and Fuleki formed the new project Seeming. The debut Seeming album, Madness and Extinction, was released in 2014. Pop music critic Ben Rayner of the Toronto Star described its musical style as "cathedral-sized electronic soundscapes consistently whipped to a windblown frenzy." German music magazine Sonic Seducer called "The Burial" from Madness and Extinction "the darkest pop song you've ever danced to".

SOL: A Self-Banishment Ritual was released in 2017, with guest appearances by noise artist Merzbow and rapper Sammus. Author and journalist Kieron Gillen ranked opening track "Doomsayer" as one of his top 40 tracks of 2017. Sonic Seducer reviewed the album as tension-filled and impactful.

2020 album The Birdwatcher's Guide to Atrocity was co-produced by Sarah Hennies, who also contributed percussion, and included guest vocals by Bill Drummond of the KLF. The Big Takeover premiered the video for "Go Small" and favorably reviewed the album.

Seeming's fourth album The World was released on Artoffact Records in December 2025. It debuted at #100 on the UK album download charts.

Within alternative music communities, Seeming's recordings have rated highly. Indie review site Spectrum Pulse dubbed The World 2025's best album. A Model of Control ranked Seeming's three albums tenth, first, and third respectively in their year-end lists for 2014, 2017, and 2020. They later named SOL: A Self-Banishment Ritual the best album of the 2010s, describing it as "a release of towering intensity, belief, and scope". Additionally, they ranked "The Burial" and "End Studies" as the best tracks of 2014 and 2020 respectively, and "Talk About Bones" as the eighth-best track of 2017. I Die:You Die listed Madness and Extinction and SOL: A Self-Banishment Ritual as their top albums of 2014 and 2017 respectively, and The Birdwatcher's Guide to Atrocity as the second best album of 2020.

== Discography ==
=== ThouShaltNot ===
==== Albums ====
- ThouShaltNot (2000, ADSR Musicwerks)
- The Holiness of Now (2001, ADSR Musicwerks; reissued by Dancing Ferret Discs in 2003)
- The White Beyond (2003, Dancing Ferret Discs)
- Land Dispute (2006, Dancing Ferret Discs)

==== EPs ====
- You'll Wake Up Yesterday (2002, ADSR Musicwerks)
- The Projectionist (2005, independent release)
- New World EP (2008, independent release)

=== Seeming ===
All music by Seeming is released on Artoffact Records.

==== Albums ====
- Madness and Extinction (2014)
- SOL: A Self-Banishment Ritual (2017)
- The Birdwatcher's Guide to Atrocity (2020)
- The World (2025)

==== EPs ====
- Silent Discovery (2014, released on 8-track tape)
- Worldburners (2015)
- Faceless (2017)
- Talk About Bones (2017)
- Monster (2020)

== Bibliography ==
- Reed, S. Alexander (2013). Assimilate: A Critical History of Industrial Music. New York: Oxford University Press. ISBN 978-0-19-983260-6.
- Reed, S. Alexander; Sandifer, Elizabeth (2014). They Might Be Giants' Flood. 33 1/3. New York: Bloomsbury Academic. ISBN 978-1-62356-915-0.
- Reed, S. Alexander (2022). Laurie Anderson's Big Science. New York: Oxford University Press. ISBN 978-0-19-092602-1.
