= De/Vision =

German synthpop group

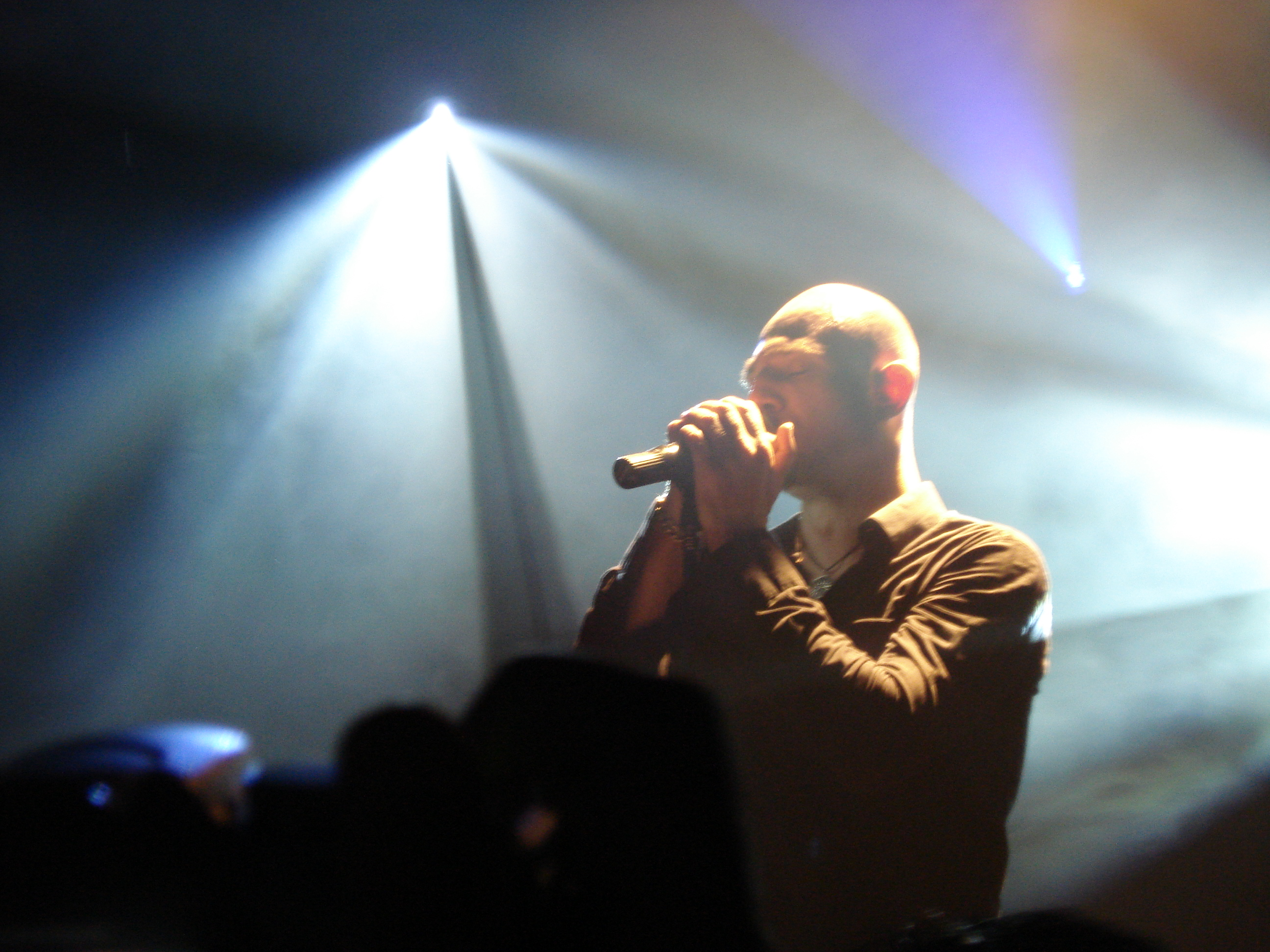
- De/Vision live in Buenos Aires, February 2008

Background information
- Origin: Germany
- Genre: Synth-pop
- Years active: 1988–present
- Labels: Popgefahr Records; Metropolis Records; Dancing Ferret Discs; Drakkar Records
- Members: Steffen Keth; Thomas Adam
- Past members: Stefan Blender; Markus Ganssert

De/Vision is a German synth-pop musical group formed in 1988. The band started as a quartet consisting of Thomas Adam, Steffen Keth, Stefan Blender, and Markus Ganssert. Blender left the band in 1991 and Ganssert departed in 2000. The name De/Vision is a play on words. The majority of the band's lyrics are in English, but they have had some songs in German.

In 2000, Keth started a side project as the vocalist with Green Court, called 'Green Court featuring De/Vision'. The band with remaining members Keth and Adam were then signed to Drakkar Records and Sony BMG in Europe, and Dancing Ferret Discs in North America. The band is currently signed to Metropolis Records in North America. Since 1994 the band has released a new studio album of original material roughly every 1.5 years, until their 2012 album Rockets and Swords.

In 2009, the band started their own label, Popgefahr, primarily to release their own works as a response to the difficulty of garnering label support.

On 25 May 2018, the single "They Won't Silence Us" was released, and on 22 June, the new studio album Citybeats was released by the band. The LP was supported by a tour that started on 21 April 2018 and ended on 2 February 2019.

== Members ==
- Steffen Keth – vocals, composition (1988–present)
- Thomas Adam – synthesizer, songwriting, vocals (1988–present)

=== Former members ===
- Markus Ganssert – synthesizer, songwriting, composition (1988–2000)
- Stefan Blender – synthesizer, composition (1988–1991)

=== Touring members ===
- Markus Koestner – drums (2005–2007, 2012–present)
- Lars Baumgart – guitars (1998–2007)
- Achim Färber – drums (2000–2004)

== Discography ==
Studio albums

- 1994 : World Without End
- 1995 : Unversed In Love
- 1995 : Antiquity
- 1996 : Fairyland?
- 1998 : Monosex
- 1998 : Monosex (Instrumental)
- 2000 : Void
- 2000 : Void (Instrumental)
- 2001 : Two
- 2001 : Two (Instrumental)
- 2003 : Devolution
- 2003 : Devolution (Instrumental)
- 2004 : 6 Feet Underground
- 2004 : 6 Feet Underground (Instrumental)
- 2006 : Subkutan (Deluxe)
- 2006 : Subkutan (Instrumental)
- 2007 : Noob
- 2007 : Noob (Instrumental)
- 2010 : Popgefahr
- 2010 : Popgefahr + Bonus USB Stick
- 2010 : Popgefahr (Instrumental)
- 2011 : Popgefahr (Remixes)
- 2012 : Rockets and Swords
- 2012 : Rockets and Swords (Instrumental)
- 2013 : Strange Days - World Without End (CD 1)
- 2013 : Strange Days - Unversed In Love (CD 2)
- 2013 : Strange Days - Unversed In Love (CD 3)
- 2016 : 13
- 2016 : 13 Extended
- 2016 : 13 Extended (MCD)
- 2016 : 13 Extended (Remix)
- 2016 : 13 Extended (Instrumental)
- 2016 : Two (Deluxe Edition)
- 2017 : The Firing Line (Vocal Apollo Lovemachine Remix) EP
- 2018 : Citybeats
- 2018 : Citybeats (Limited Edition)

=== EP, Tracks & Compilations ===
- 1990 : Your Hands On My Skin EP
- 1992 : Boy On The Street EP
- 1993 : Try To Forget EP
- 1994 : Dinner Without Grace EP
- 1994 : Love Me Again EP
- 1995 : Blue Moon EP
- 1995 : Dress Me When I Bleed EP
- 1995 : Unversed In Love + Bonus CD
- 1996 : I Regret (Promo )EP
- 1996 : I Regret EP
- 1996 : Sweet Life EP
- 1996 : Treasury...EP
- 1998 : Hear Me Calling EP
- 1998 : Strange Affection EP
- 1998 : Strange Affection - Remixes EP
- 1998 : We Fly... Tonight EP
- 1998 : We Fly... TonightE - Remixes EP
- 1998 : Zehn (Compilation)
- 1999 : Blue Moon '99 (Promo) EP
- 2000 : Foreigner (Promo) EP
- 2000 : Freedom EP
- 2000 : Shining EP
- 2000 : Subout EP
- 2001 : Heart-Shaped Tumor EP
- 2002 : Lonely Day EP
- 2002 : Remixed (Limited Edition)
- 2002 : Remixed (Limited Edition)(Bonus CD)
- 2002 : Unplugged
- 2003 : A New Dawn EP
- 2003 : Digital Dream EP
- 2003 : Drifting Sideways EP
- 2003 : Miss You More EP
- 2004 : I'm Not Dreaming Of You EP
- 2004 : Unplugged & The Motion Pictures
- 2004 : Unputdownable EP
- 2005 : The End EP
- 2005 : Turn Me On EP
- 2005 : Zeitmaschine Remixed EP
- 2006 : Best Of...
- 2006 : Love Will Find A Way EP
- 2006 : The Best Of (12 Inch Version)(Compilation)
- 2007 : Da Mals (Compilation)
- 2007 : Flavour Of The Week EP
- 2008 : 20th Anniversary Remix EP.
- 2009 : DNA Lounge Live (Bootleg) with Seabound
- 2009 : Rage - Time To Be Alive EP
- 2011 : Twisted Story EP
- 2012 : Brotherhood Of Man EP
- 2012 : Kamikase EP
- 2013 : Brother In Arms EP
- 2014 : Popgefahr (12 Inch Edition)
- 2015 : Be A Light To Yourself EP
- 2016 : Synchronize (MaBose Remix) EP
- 2018 : They Won't Silence Us EP

=== Live albums ===
- 1997 : Fairylive !
- 2002 : Live 95 and 96
- 2003 : Devolution Tour – Live
- 2019 : Mera Luna - Live

== DVD ==
- Unplugged And the Motion Pictures [PAL] (2003)
- Pictures of the Past [NTSC] (2003)
