= Dancing Ferret =

The Dancing Ferret entertainment group is an unofficial collective name for Dancing Ferret Discs and Dancing Ferret Concerts. It was started by Patrick Rodgers (a.k.a. DJ Ferret) in 1995 with the formation of Dancing Ferret Concerts. The company markets bands from the gothic rock, heavy metal, alternative rock, neo-Medieval, trip hop, and industrial genres of music.

In 2008, Dancing Ferret Discs made the decision to wind down releasing new material on their label. Following two releases in 2009, the label's last official new releases were 2011's Sverker and 2013's Gimlie by Corvus Corax.

== Dancing Ferret Discs ==
Dancing Ferret Discs is a Philadelphia-based record label started in August 1998. It is the record label "sister company" of Dancing Ferret, and hosts bands in the alternative scene. While the label is no longer signing new bands or releasing new material, a partial list of bands that were previously signed to DFD includes:

- Absurd Minds
- Angelspit
- Behind The Scenes
- Carfax Abbey
- Corvus Corax
- The Crüxshadows
- De/Vision
- The Dreamside
- Ego Likeness
- Eisbrecher
- Estampie
- Faun
- Gothminister
- Information Society
- Irfan
- Joachim Witt
- The Last Dance
- Lunascape
- Mo-Do
- Neuroticfish
- Paralysed Age
- Qntal
- Subway to Sally
- ThouShaltNot
- Voltaire

Some of these bands were signed to Dancing Ferret's sublabel, Noir Records, which focuses on less club-oriented fare.

In 2005, Dancing Ferret Discs released Dancing in the Dark: 10 Years of Dancing Ferret, a compilation album with songs from some of the label's artists.

== Dancing Ferret Concerts ==
Dancing Ferret Concerts produces concerts, club events and DJ dance nights in the city of Philadelphia. Its weekly party, "Nocturne", debuted in January 1996. Nocturne ceased its weekly events on August 1, 2012.

Dancing Ferret celebrated its 30th anniversary with a concert at Underground Arts in Philadelphia on August 15, 2025. The event featured musical performances from Information Society, Tapping the Vein, and Ships In The Night in addition to DJ sets by Jon Gill.
