= List of diseases (D) =

This is a list of diseases starting with the letter "D".

== D ==
- D ercole syndrome

== Da ==
- Daentl Towsend Siegel syndrome
- Dahlberg Borer Newcomer syndrome
- Daish–Hardman–Lamont syndrome
- Dandy–Walker facial hemangioma
- Dandy–Walker malformation postaxial polydactyly
- Dandy–Walker syndrome recessive form
- Dandy–Walker malformation with mental retardation, basal ganglia disease, and seizures
- Dandy–Walker malformation with mental retardation, macrocephaly, myopia, and brachytelephalangy
- Dandy–Walker syndrome
- Daneman–Davy–Mancer syndrome
- Darier's disease
- Davenport–Donlan syndrome
- DAVID syndrome
- Davis–Lafer syndrome

== De ==
- De Barsy syndrome
- De Hauwere–Leroy–Adriaenssens syndrome
- DeSanctis–Cacchione syndrome

=== Dea ===
==== Deaf ====
- Deaf blind hypopigmentation

===== Deafn =====
- Deafness

====== Deafne ======
Deafness c – Deafness s

- Deafness conductive ptosis skeletal anomalies
- Deafness conductive stapedial ear malformation facial palsy
- Deafness congenital onychodystrophy recessive
- Deafness craniofacial syndrome
- Deafness enamel hypoplasia nail defects
- Deafness epiphyseal dysplasia short stature
- Deafness goiter stippled epiphyses
- Deafness hyperuricemia neurologic ataxia
- Deafness hypogonadism syndrome
- Deafness hypospadias metacarpal and metatarsal syndrome
- Deafness mesenteric diverticula of small bowel neuropathy
- Deafness mixed with perilymphatic Gusher, X-linked
- Deafness nephritis ano rectal malformation
- Deafness neurosensory pituitary dwarfism
- Deafness nonsyndromic, Connexin 26 linked
- Deafness oligodontia syndrome
- Deafness onychodystrophy dominant form
- Deafness peripheral neuropathy arterial disease
- Deafness progressive cataract autosomal dominant
- Deafness skeletal dysplasia lip granuloma
- Deafness symphalangism

Deafness v – Deafness x

- Deafness vitiligo achalasia
- Deafness white hair contractures papillomas
- Deafness X-linked, DFN3
- Deafness, autosomal dominant nonsyndromic sensorineural
- Deafness, isolated, due to mitochondrial transmission
- Deafness, neurosensory nonsyndromic recessive, DFN
- Deafness, X linked, DFN

==== Deal ====
- Deal–Barratt–Dillon syndrome

=== Dec–Del ===
- Deciduous skin
- Decompensated phoria
- Decompression sickness
- Deep vein thrombosis
- Dabbing Syndrome
- Defect in synthesis of adenosylcobalamin
- Defective apolipoprotein B-100
- Defective expression of HLA class 2
- Degenerative motor system disease
- Degenerative optic myopathy
- Degos disease
- Dehydratase deficiency
- Dejerine–Sottas disease
- Delayed ejaculation
- Delayed membranous cranial ossification
- Delayed sleep phase syndrome
- Delayed speech facial asymmetry strabismus ear lobe creases
- Deletion 6q16 q21
- Delirium
- Delirium tremens
- Delusional disorder
- Delleman–Oorthuys syndrome
- Delta-1-pyrroline-5-carboxylate dehydrogenase deficiency
- Delta-sarcoglycanopathy

=== Dem–Dep ===
- Dementia
  - Dementia, alcohol
  - Dementia progressive lipomembranous polycysta
  - Dementia, familial British
  - Dementia, frontotemporal
  - Dementia, HIV
  - Dementia pugilistica
  - Dementia, vascular
  - Dementia with Lewy bodies
- Demodicidosis
- Demyelinating disease
- Dengue fever
- Dennis–Cohen syndrome
- Dennis–Fairhurst–Moore syndrome
- Dent disease
- Dental aberrations steroid dehydrogenase deficienciency
- Dental caries
- Dental fluorosis
- Dental tissue neoplasm
- Dentatorubral-pallidoluysian atrophy
- Dentin dysplasia sclerotic bones
- Dentin dysplasia, coronal
- Dentin dysplasia, radicular
- Dentinogenesis imperfecta
- Dentophobia
- Dependent personality disorder
- Depersonalization derealization disorder
- Depression (clinical)
- Depressive personality disorder

=== Der–Dev ===
- Der(22)t(8;22)(q24.1;q11.1) syndrome
- Dercum's disease a.k.a. Adiposis dolorosa
- Der Kaloustian–Jarudi–Khoury syndrome
- Der Kaloustian–Mcintosh–Silver syndrome
- Dermal dysplasia
- Dermatitis herpetiformis
- Dermatocardioskeletal syndrome Boronne type
- Dermatographic urticaria
- Dermatofibroma
- Dermatoleukodystrophy
- Dermatomyositis
- Dermatoosteolysis, Kirghizian type
- Dermatopathia pigmentosa reticularis
- Dermatophytids
- Dermatophytosis
- Dermochondrocorneal dystrophy of François
- Dermoodontodysplasia
- Desbuquois syndrome
- Desmin-related myofibrillar myopathy
- Desmoid disease
- Desmoid tumor
- Desmoplastic small round cell tumor
- Developmental coordination disorder
- Developmental delay epilepsy neonatal diabetes (DEND syndrome)
- Developmental delay hypotonia extremities hypertrophy
- Developmental dyslexia
- Developmental dysphasia familial
- Devic syndrome
- Devriendt–Legius–Fryns syndrome
- Devriendt–Vandenberghe–Fryns syndrome

=== Dex ===
- Dexamethasone sensitive hypertension
- Dextrocardia with situs inversus
- Dextrocardia
- Dextrocardia-bronchiectasis-sinusitis

== Dg ==
- D-glycerate dehydrogenase deficiency
- D-Glyceric acidemia

== Di ==
=== Dia ===
==== Diab–Diam ====
- Diabetes hypogonadism deafness mental retardation
- Diabetes insipidus

- Diabetes insipidus, diabetes mellitus, optic atrophy
- Diabetes insipidus, nephrogenic type 1
- Diabetes insipidus, nephrogenic type 2
- Diabetes insipidus, nephrogenic type 3
- Diabetes insipidus, nephrogenic, dominant type
- Diabetes insipidus, nephrogenic, recessive type

- Diabetes mellitus
  - Diabetes mellitus type 1
  - Diabetes mellitus type 2
- Diabetes persistent Müllerian ducts
- Diabetes, insulin dependent
- Diabetic angiopathy
- Diabetic embryopathy
- Diabetic nephropathy
- Diabetic neuropathy
- Diamond–Blackfan anemia

==== Diap–Dias ====
- Diaphragmatic agenesia
- Diaphragmatic agenesis radial aplasia omphalocele
- Diaphragmatic defect limb deficiency skull defect
- Diaphragmatic hernia abnormal face limb
- Diaphragmatic hernia exomphalos corpus callosum agenesis
- Diaphragmatic hernia upper limb defects
- Diaphragmatic hernia, congenital
- Diarrhea chronic with villous atrophy
- Diarrhea polyendocrinopathy infections X linked
- Diastematomyelia
- Diastrophic dysplasia

=== Dib–Din ===
- Dibasic aminoaciduria 2
- Dibasic aminoaciduria type 1
- Dicarboxylicaminoaciduria
- Die Smulders–Droog–Van Dijk syndrome
- Die Smulders–Vles–Fryns syndrome
- Diencephalic syndrome
- Dieterich's disease
- Diethylstilbestrol antenatal infection
- Diffuse idiopathic skeletal hyperostosis
- Diffuse leiomyomatosis with Alport syndrome
- Diffuse neonatal hemangiomatosis
- Diffuse palmoplantar keratoderma, Bothnian type
- Diffuse panbronchiolitis
- Diffuse parenchymal lung disease
- DiGeorge syndrome
- Digestive duplication
- Digitorenocerebral syndrome
- Digoxin toxicity
- Dihydropteridine reductase deficiency
- Dihydropyrimidine dehydrogenase deficiency
- Dilated cardiomyopathy
- Dimitri–Sturge–Weber syndrome
- Dincsoy–Salih–Patel syndrome
- Dinno–Shearer–Weisskopf syndrome

=== Dio–Dip ===
- Diomedi–Bernardi–Placidi syndrome
- Dionisi–Vici–Sabetta–Gambarara syndrome
- Diphallia
- Diphallus rachischisis imperforate anus
- Diphosphoglycerate mutase deficiency of erythrocyte
- Diphtheria
- Diplopia
  - Diplopia, binocular
  - Diplopia, monocular

=== Dis–Div ===
- Disaccharide intolerance iii
- Discoid lupus erythematosus
- Disinhibited attachment disorder
- Dislocation of the hip dysmorphism
- Disorder in the hormonal synthesis with or without goiter
- Disorganization syndrome
- Dissecting cellulitis of the scalp
- Dissociative amnesia
- Dissociative hysteria
- Dissociative fugue
- Dissociative identity disorder
- Distal arthrogryposis Moore–Weaver type
- Distal myopathy Markesbery–Griggs type
- Distal myopathy with vocal cord weakness
- Distal myopathy, Nonaka type
- Distal myopathy
- Distal primary acidosis, familial
- Distemper
- Distichiasis heart congenital anomalies
- Distomatosis
- Diverticulitis
- Diverticulosis

== Dk–Do ==
- Dk phocomelia syndrome
- D-minus hemolytic uremic syndrome
- Dobrow syndrome
- Dominant cleft palate
- Dominant ichthyosis vulgaris
- Dominant zonular cataract
- Donnai Barrow syndrome
- DOOR syndrome
- Dopamine beta hydroxylase deficiency
- DOPA-responsive dystonia
- Double cortex
- Double discordia
- Double fingernail of fifth finger
- Double outlet left ventricle
- Double outlet right ventricle
- Double tachycardia induced by catecholamines
- Double uterus-hemivagina-renal agenesis
- Down syndrome
- Doxorubicin-induced cardiomyopathy
- Doyne honeycomb retinal dystrophy

== Dp–Du ==
- D-plus hemolytic uremic syndrome
- Drachtman–Weinblatt–Sitarz syndrome
- Dracunculiasis
- Duane anomaly mental retardation
- Duane syndrome
- Dubin–Johnson syndrome
- Dubowitz syndrome
- Duchenne muscular dystrophy
- Duhring–Brocq disease
- Duhring's disease
- Duker–Weiss–Siber syndrome
- Duodenal atresia tetralogy of Fallot
- Duodenal atresia
- Duplication of leg mirror foot
- Duplication of the thumb unilateral biphalangeal
- Duplication of urethra
- Dupont–Sellier–Chochillon syndrome
- Dupuytren subungual exostosis
- Dupuytren's contracture
- Dust-induced lung disease

== Dw ==
- Dwarfism

- Dwarfism bluish sclerae
- Dwarfism deafness retinitis pigmentosa
- Dwarfism lethal type advanced bone age
- Dwarfism mental retardation eye abnormality
- Dwarfism short limb absent fibulas very short digits
- Dwarfism stiff joint ocular abnormalities
- Dwarfism syndesmodysplasic
- Dwarfism tall vertebrae
- Dwarfism thanatophoric
- Dwarfism thin bones multiple fractures

== Dy ==
=== Dyg–Dyk ===
- Dyggve–Melchior–Clausen syndrome
- Dykes–Markes–Harper syndrome

=== Dys ===
==== Dysa–Dysk ====
- Dysautonomia
- Dysbarism
- Dyscalculia
- Dyschondrosteosis nephritis
- Dyschromatosis universalis
- Dysencephalia splachnocystica or Meckel–Gruber
- Dysequilibrium syndrome
- Dyserythropoietic anemia, congenital

- Dyserythropoietic anemia, congenital type 1
- Dyserythropoietic anemia, congenital type 2
- Dyserythropoietic anemia, congenital type 3

- Dysexecutive syndrome
- Dysferlinopathy
- Dysfibrinogenemia, familial
- Dysfibrinogenemia, acquired
- Dysgerminoma
- Dysgraphia
- Dysharmonic skeletal maturation muscular fiber disproportion
- Dyskeratosis congenita of Zinsser–Cole–Engman
- Dyskeratosis congenita
- Dyskeratosis follicularis
- Dyskinesia, drug induced
- Dyskinesia

==== Dysm–Dyss ====
- Dysmorphism abnormal vocalization mental retardation
- Dysmorphism cleft palate loose skin
- Dysmorphophobia
- Dysmyelination
- Dysosteosclerosis
- Dysostosis acral with facial and genital abnormalities
- Dysostosis peripheral
- Dysostosis Stanescu type
- Dysostosis
- Dyspareunia
- Dysphasic dementia, hereditary
- Dysphonia, chronic spasmodic
- Dysplasia epiphysealis hemimelica
- Dysplasia
- Dysplastic cortical hyperostosis
- Dysplastic nevus syndrome
- Dysprothrombinemia
- Dysraphism cleft lip palate limb reduction defects
- Dyssegmental dysplasia glaucoma
- Dyssegmental dysplasia Silverman–Handmaker type

==== Dyst ====
- Dysthymia
- Dystonia musculorum deformans
  - Dystonia musculorum deformans type 1
  - Dystonia musculorum deformans type 2
- Dystonia progressive with diurnal variation
- Dystonia
- Dystrophia myotonica
- Dystrophic epidermolysis bullosa
- Dystrophinopathy
