= Electronic Saviors: Industrial Music to Cure Cancer =

Series of industrial music compilations

Electronic Saviors is a series of cancer charity industrial music compilations of exclusive tracks and mixes compiled by Jim Semonik of Red Lokust and Rein[Forced], mastered by Da5id Din and later by Wade Allin, and released through Distortion Productions and Metropolis Records. It is heavily promoted through various shows, through radio airplay, podcasts, and via trailers. As of 2019, the collections had raised more than $114,000 for various cancer related charities, and had received an award from the American Society of Colon and Rectal Surgeons (ASCRS).

According to Semonik, Electronic Saviors was inspired by There Is No Time, a compilation of the industrial music scene released by Ras Dva in 1995.

In 2017 the first spin-off album was released and in 2018 the first music video of an Electronic Saviors track debuted on Regen Magazine's website.

The sixth entry in the series was released on June 12, 2020. Five years later, volume seven, ReUnion, was released on May 2, 2025.

== Initial release ==
Electronic Saviors: Industrial Music to Cure Cancer

Compilation album by Various Artists
- Released: January 21, 2010
- Genre: Industrial, electro-industrial
- Label: Metropolis Records

Electronic Saviors chronology
Electronic Saviors: Industrial Music to Cure Cancer (2010)	Electronic Saviors Volume 2: Recurrence (2012)

Professional ratings
Review scores
Source	Rating
Brutal Resonance	7/10 stars

Disc 1: Diagnosis and Insurance
No.	Title	Artist	Length
1.	"Stay Sick"	SMP
2.	"Notes From a War"	Stromkern
3.	"Smoking Gun"	Boole
4.	"Never Say Farewell"	Interface
5.	"Solar Max (The Jimmy Semtex Coil)"	CHEMLAB
6.	"Goodbye"	Bow Ever Down
7.	"Jim, Let Me Know When You Can Drink Again (Extreme Party Stylezz)"	The Gothsicles
8.	"Painkiller"	TERRORFAKT
9.	"Things Unkind"	16 Volt
10.	"Malignancy (Pancreatitis Mix)"	Rein[Forced]
11.	"Save Your Serpent (Light as a Feather Mix)"	Ego Likeness
12.	"7 Dimensional"	Burikusu!!!
13.	"Rapture"	Inure
14.	"Endure (Encoder Mix)"	Cesium 137
15.	"Axium (Post-Affliction Version feat. 16 Volt)"	Cyanotic
16.	"Deliverance"	Silent Auction
17.	"Cancerous Catalyst Converter"	Terror Firma Sky

Disc 2: Chemotherapy and Radiation
No.	Title	Artist	Length
1.	"Beat It. Kill It."	The Dark Clan
2.	"Search and Destroy (Savior Version)"	The Azoic
3.	"Version2 (Aesthetic Perfectic Mix)"	genCAB
4.	"The Fight"	Christ Analogue
5.	"Malignant Disco"	Prometheus Burning featuring Jimmy Semtex of Rein{Forced]
6.	"Run First"	boxed warning
7.	"Impermanence (Flight AC-112 Mix)"	Assemblage 23
8.	"From A Wateland To A Dream"	I:Scintilla
9.	"Giving In To The Change (Assemblage 23 Mix)"	Imperative Reaction
10.	"Sick"	ThouShaltNot
11.	"Nosepad"	Combichrist
12.	"Stigmata"	Sonik Foundry
13.	"Fear is Fear"	XuberX
14.	"Into the Wind"	Mindless Faith
15.	"Some Sorta Rhythmic Machine"	Cyber Strukture
16.	"Count Backwards From 10"	vircon
17.	"The Great War"	Jorden Decay

Disc 3: Surgery
No.	Title	Artist	Length
1.	"Breaking"	Deathline Int'l
2.	"Jim's Song"	Encoder featuring Jimmy Semtex of Rein{Forced]
3.	"Right Beside You (Save Me Now Mix)"	Vicious Alliance
4.	"Maybe Today"	backandtotheleft
5.	"Katharsis (Purification Mix)"	Nachtmahr
6.	"Under the Gun Immune Response"	Null Device
7.	"Until We Die (Winter Edit)"	Suicide Commando
8.	"Don't Worry (We'll Meet Up Again)"	Agnes Wired For Sound
9.	"Blood (2009 Edit)"	System Syn
10.	"The Juice of Rotten Fruit"	Acumen Nation
11.	"The Ones (genCAB Mix)"	Aesthetic Perfection
12.	"Not Me"	Dismantled
13.	"Children Of Decay (Northborne Mix)"	FGFC820
14.	"I've Sold Your Organs on the Black Market to Finance the Purchase of a Used Minivan (I Don't Want Those Organs If There's Cancer in Them Mix)"	Everything Goes Cold
15.	"The Scalpel song (Neoplasm edit)"	Leaether Strip
16.	"Sleeping Beauty"	Mordacious
17.	"Detritus of Reason"	Flesh Field

Disc 4: Recovery
No.	Title	Artist	Length
1.	"X-White Noise (Gift Mix)"	Noisuf-X
2.	"I Am Forever"	Hardwire
3.	"Transmission"	The Atomica Project
4.	"Gravity (Endanger Mix)"	Massiv In Mensch featuring Mind.In.A.Box - Supermassive
5.	"Free (Interface Mix)"	SD6
6.	"Here and Now (Banging Mix by XP8)"	Obscenity Trial
7.	"Dawn"	Alter Der Ruine VS Premeditated Light
8.	"Survival"	nolongerhuman
9.	"Imposter (ThouShaltNot Remix)"	Iris
10.	"Alive"	Debutante
11.	"You Tried To Kill Me but I Killed You First"	Andraculoid
12.	"Access Denied (Rotersand Mix)"	Deviant UK
13.	"The Sweetest Soul (Rex Mix)"	Hypefactor
14.	"Duct Tape My Heart (Chinese Theatre Remix)"	Freezepop
15.	"In the Aftermath (Moroder Mix)"	Spahn Ranch
16.	"Jim Made Cancer His Bitch"	Caustic

A fifth "Disc" was included as a digital download.

5: Bonus Medication
No.	Title	Artist	Length
1.	"Incomplete Me (Remix)"	Wreckcreation
2.	"Visulation"	Borderlines
3.	"Three"	AimOniA
4.	"Twist of Fate"	Beloved Dead
5.	"Please Let Me Go"	Derek C.F.Pegritz
6.	"Riser"	Molecule Party
7.	"Peaceful Shores"	Patricia Wake
8.	"Left 4 Dead"	Neurobash
9.	"The Best Way to Tear Anything Down is to Blast!"	Jon Zaremba
10.	"Virus Free"	Less Like Flesh
11.	"Schrodinger"	EVP
12.	"Dissolving the Sanity"	Surviving The Odyssey
13.	"EXTRA LIVES!"	Retar-D2
14.	"Dread"	The Hose Face
15.	"Evident Product of Effort"	Sachem Drenda
16.	"With Heavy Hands"	TowerOpensFire

== Volume 2: Recurrence ==
Electronic Saviors Volume 2: Recurrence

Compilation album by Various Artists
- Released: May 8, 2012
- Genre: Industrial, electro-industrial
- Label: Metropolis Records

Electronic Saviors chronology
Electronic Saviors: Industrial Music to Cure Cancer (2010)	Electronic Saviors Volume 2: Recurrence (2012)	Electronic Savior Volume 3: Remission (2014)

Electronic Saviors Volume 2: Recurrence is the second Electronic Saviors cancer charity compilation compiled by Jim Semonik of Rein[Forced], a cancer survivor.

Professional ratings
Review scores
Source	Rating
COMA Music Magazine	Favorable
Necromag	Favorable

Disc 1: Shock
No.	Title	Artist	Length
1.	"A World Of No Relief"	Tenek	4:45
2.	"Inside"	Deathline International	5:19
3.	"Tumor Curbjob"	Cancerface	3:49
4.	"Footsteps"	Paniclift	4:44
5.	"Who Wants To Join Our Superhero Team, Right Now It's Just Me And Jim"	The Gothsicles	3:20
6.	"Deworld (New Day Mix)"	Inertia	4:13
7.	"Pack Your Bags Honey, We're Going To Hell"	Santa Hates You	4:16
8.	"Corruption"	The Azoic	4:50
9.	"Burnt"	Rein[Forced]	5:38
10.	"Bitcrush"	Deathproof	2:55
11.	"Nova"	Cyferdyne	4:53
12.	"Through Closing Eyes"	Null Device	4:09
13.	"Relapse"	Sonik Foundry	4:10
14.	"Stolen Car (B&E Mix)"	Left Spine Down	4:05
15.	"Under Fire"	Detroit Diesel	4:16
16.	"Bitter Truth"	In Strict Confidence	4:28
17.	"Lucid Dreams"	Edge Of Dawn	4:47
18.	"The Harbour Song"	Constance Rudert	2:28

Disc 2: Denial
No.	Title	Artist	Length
1.	"No Regrets"	Wreckcreation Featuring Dan Clark Of The Dark Clan	3:46
2.	"Lament (Electronic Saviors remix)"	Project Pitchfork	6:05
3.	"Immortal (Icon of coil Mix By Sebastian Komor)"	Solitary Experiments	4:54
4.	"Descriptive"	Hypefactor	5:02
5.	"Phantasm"	Uberbyte featuring Jimmy Semtex of Rein[Forced]	4:18
6.	"Tragedy"	Mindless Faith	4:49
7.	"The Will (Survival Mix)"	Soil & Eclipse	5:12
8.	"The Perils of Indifference (Stahlnebel vs. Black Selket Remix)"	Suicide Commando	4:58
9.	"Mirage (Saviors Mix)"	Lowe	5:47
10.	"I Don't Exist"	CYLiX	4:10
11.	"Swimmers Can Drown (Diabolic Art Mix)"	I:Scintilla	5:51
12.	"This is the Life (Cryogen Second Mix)"	Inure	4:05
13.	"Hollow Spirits"	TraKKtor	3:52
14.	"Monster (V2)"	23RAINYDAYS	4:40
15.	"Voran (Der Teufel im Spiegel Mix by Boole)"	Accessory	3:22
16.	"Intention"	Twilight Laboratory	4:00
17.	"Marching Into Valhalla"	Terrorfakt	3:43

Disc 3: Anger
No.	Title	Artist	Length
1.	"God Damn (Imperative Reaction Remix)"	System Syn	3:55
2.	"A.I Dominion"	Ad Inferna	4:41
3.	"Walpurgisnacht"	Boole	5:23
4.	"Infidel"	Ego Likeness	3:59
5.	"Worlds Collide (Saviors Mix)"	Binary Park	6:13
6.	"The Just Will Be Silenced"	Die Sektor	4:40
7.	"Suicide Execute"	Stiff Valentine	3:18
8.	"Punish Your Head (Mental Discipline Remix)"	head-less	5:14
9.	"This Life (Lexincrypt remix)"	Ludovico Technique	4:50
10.	"Sweet Hard Revenge (Fallon Nieves Rendition)"	Psy'Aviah	5:16
11.	"The Devil’s Is In The Details (Sthilmann Remix)"	Aesthetic Perfection	5:04
12.	"Fight the System (Rabia Sorda Mix)"	Terminal Choice	5:04
13.	"Suffer this world (Centhron Remix)"	Diverje	5:33
14.	"My Enemy"	am.psych	4:21
15.	"The Other Side"	The Rain Within	3:20
16.	"The Innocent ($150 Remix by Idiot Stare)"	UCNX	3:42
17.	"Snakes, You Get Out Of Here! This Is Not Your Room, This Is My Room. Now, You Just Get Out Of Here!"	Jon Zaremba	4:24

Disc 4: Bargaining
No.	Title	Artist	Length
1.	"Always This Heart"	The Mighty Chouffe	3:20
2.	"Satellite"	Angels On Acid	4:43
3.	"Thirsty (V2.0)"	Terrolokaust	4:30
4.	"Decent Cancer"	Ashbury Heights	6:48
5.	"The Great Commandment"	God Module	4:48
6.	"Lost"	Bella Morte	4:01
7.	"Shadows"	Encoder	4:36
8.	"Ghosts (Swank version)"	Alter Der Ruine	4:28
9.	"Sabotage"	Militant	1:51
10.	"Hurricane (Splitter Mix)"	Ghost & Writer	5:03
11.	"Chasing The Dragon (Lost Tribe Version)"	iVardensphere	5:01
12.	"Satiric Strokes"	Spetsnaz	4:20
13.	"Came And See"	Decree	4:39
14.	"These Days (Single Mix)"	SD6	4:36
15.	"Hand Of God (Iszoloscope Remix)"	Distorted Memory	3:59
16.	"Thirty Eight (Featuring Sarah Chenoweth of Synapse)"	Cryogen Second	4:29
17.	"Puddlehopping (Alternate Mix by Todd Aeschliman)"	Trigger10d	5:05
18.	"Another Sacrifice (Rejected)"	Life Cried	2:31

Disc 5: Depression
No.	Title	Artist	Length
1.	"You'll Never Understand (Harder)"	Mesh	5:18
2.	"Sick As Love"	Dark Clan	3:38
3.	"1984 (Was A Very Bad Year)"	Caustic	4:35
4.	"Burn (Father Dub Mix)"	16 Volt	4:03
5.	"You"	Empusa Featuring Miss FD	5:01
6.	"King of the Impossible (Signal Drums Mix By The Dark Clan)"	Everything Goes Cold	4:34
7.	"Second Class Citizen (JFS Mix) by Ken “Hiwatt” Marshall)"	Unit:187	5:44
8.	"Where Will You Be?"	Blutengel	3:52
9.	"Surrender"	AimOniA	4:43
10.	"Your Love, My Medicine"	Patricia Wake Feat Dan Clark, Lane Ellen, John Verbos, and Jolexx	4:32
11.	"Dying Life"	EsperMachine	5:26
12.	"Paralyzed For Sleep"	boxed warning	4:33
13.	"Imperfexion Humana (Radio PerVersion)"	Reaxion Guerrilla	3:45
14.	"From Within (xrayhead Mix)"	Cesium 137	5:02
15.	"Share The Cancer"	Retrogramme	5:41
16.	"If This Body Should Fail Me"	N.T.T	5:28
17.	"Beyond Death"	Necrotek	2:53

Disc 6: Acceptance
No.	Title	Artist	Length
1.	"Lightbringer (Speedrun II)"	Covenant Feat Necro Facility	4:26
2.	"Re:Mission"	Sensuous Enemy	4:32
3.	"Never Felt Better (Recovery mix)"	Neuroactive	5:09
4.	"Can't You Feel The Beat (Nitronoise remix)"	Nachtmahr	3:59
5.	"Blue Alice (Jims Of The Flesh Mix)"	Ayria Feat Jimmerz Semtex of Rein[Forced] & Jimmerz Cookas of I:Scintilla	4:05
6.	"Speed Of Light (T3chn0ph0b1a remix)"	Syrian	4:00
7.	"Resilience"	Decoded Feedback	4:54
8.	"Üebers Wasser Gehen (:SITD: Remix)"	Obscenity Trial	5:02
9.	"Terrible Strength"	XuberX	3:45
10.	"In Between (Irradiated Mix)"	Monody	3:16
11.	"Embraced By The Light"	Hocico	3:51
12.	"New Year (A Heartbeat From The End)"	ThouShaltNot	3:57
13.	"The Heart Of America (Dräcos Mix)"	FGFC820	5:35
14.	"Inner Light (Featuring Liebchen)"	Interface	5:32
15.	"Music For Medicinal Purposes"	Terror Firma Sky	4:16
16.	"Silicone Sheets"	Agnes Wired For Sound	4:43
17.	"I Am The Man"	Society Burning	4:13
18.	"Terror"	DYM	3:39

Bonus Disc 7: Testing
No.	Title	Artist	Length
1.	"The Empty Stretcher"	Nurturing Decay	5:28
2.	"I Die ((Revisionist mix by Cyanotic)"	for all the emptiness	4:15
3.	"Sanctuary (Refuge Mix)"	Antidote For Annie	4:34
4.	"Silhouette"	Joshua Hart	4:16
5.	"Ambivalent Frost"	Cyber Strukture	4:32
6.	"We Rise"	Black Ring	4:03
7.	"Apocalyptic Visions"	Einsengeist	4:04
8.	"Sharp As Stars (Terrolokaust Remix)"	Surgyn	4:38
9.	"Madness Not Medicine"	COR3 MATTER	4:26
10.	"Remission"	vircon	3:06
11.	"Saviour"	Ghost In The Static	3:49
12.	"Weaponized"	Surviving The Odyssey featuring Jimmy Semtex of Rein[Forced]	3:44
13.	"Control"	Platform One	4:29
14.	"Mr Son"	Jolexx	3:43
15.	"Mechanical Override"	Tranzitional Override	4:34
16.	"Phoenix Effect (Flash Point Mix by New Army)"	Witness the Apotheosis	4:44
17.	"Somebody To Save"	Short To Ground	4:19
18.	"Not On My Watch"	The Hose Face	4:00

Bonus Disc 8: Reconstruction
No.	Title	Artist	Length
1.	"Salvo"	The Molecule Party	4:00
2.	"Frank's Theme"	Mickle Boulevard	3:29
3.	"The Essence of Pain"	Synthetic Division	3:42
4.	"Where Did You Go (ES Mix)"	Bioassay	4:04
5.	"Fading Nothing"	Process Type	3:28
6.	"Intonement"	Shutterdown	2:47
7.	"Gone"	Venus In Furs	3:36
8.	"From Hell"	Project Rotten	3:54
9.	"Inamorata (feat. Jimmy Semtex)"	Veniculture	4:16
10.	"Heartlikeapheonixinafirestorm"	Hopeful Machines	2:59
11.	"Souless Killing Machine"	Systematik Violence	4:57
12.	"Hammer Democracy"	Preacher	5:13
13.	"Apogee"	Stoneburner	5:10
14.	"Who Drugged Me?"	Mike Saga Vs BlackOPz	4:20
15.	"Boom Ra Tech"	Servitor Sanctum 7	4:09
16.	"Black Lung"	Microwaved	4:36
17.	"Waiting Game"	DJ Lollidrop	3:57
18.	"One Step Forward"	Illusion Of Joy	4:31
19.	"Oath Breaker"	Jordan Decay	4:10

== Volume 3: Remission ==
Electronic Saviors Volume 3: Remission

Compilation album by Various Artists
- Released: 2014
- Genre: Industrial, electro-industrial
- Label: Metropolis Records

Electronic Saviors chronology
Electronic Saviors Volume 2: Recurrence (May 24, 2012)	Electronic Saviors Volume 3: Remission (2014)	Electronic Saviors IV: Retaliation (2016)

Professional ratings
Review scores
Source	Rating
New Noise	Favorable

Disc 1: Victory
No.	Title	Artist	Length
1.	"Ever Careful"	16 Volt	3:05
2.	"LightsOut"	Stromkern	4:33
3.	"In Den Staub"	Deathline Int'l	4:10
4.	"A Final Elegant Turn"	The Dark Clan	3:35
5.	"Saints Without a Halo"	HellSector	5:05
6.	"Last Mistake (Dominatrix Mix)"	Assemblage 23	6:19
7.	"From My Cold Dead Hands (Sirus Remix)"	Combichrist	4:55
8.	"Enemy"	Modern Weapons	3:53
9.	"Ashes"	Null Device	3:52
10.	"Eternity (Vox Edit)"	Velvet Acid Christ	4:44
11.	"Death by Stereo"	Caustic	4:21
12.	"Dead Inside (Remix by Helltrash)"	The Ludovico Technique	4:40
13.	"Siren Song (Quiet Mix by Panic Lift)"	genCAB	3:20
14.	"Postscript"	Lost Signal	6:12
15.	"Great Eraser (Caustic's Hummer of the Gods Mix)"	Prude	5:23
16.	"It Never Ends"	The Anesthesiologists	5:20
17.	"Narcissist (Zero Corporation Remix)"	Attrition	5:05

Disc 2: Exhilaration
No.	Title	Artist	Length
1.	"Mother Of Crows"	Ivardensphere	5:58
2.	"Defeated"	[Rein]Forced	5:42
3.	"The Funk"	GoFight	3:54
4.	"Fixation"	Interface	4:51
5.	"Biggest Fan"	Hate Dept	4:37
6.	"Let It All Go"	The Azoic	3:30
7.	"Side Effect"	Left Spine Down	4:29
8.	"Death Pusher"	Decoded Feedback	4:49
9.	"Night Run (Ducati Slow Jab by Informatik)"	XP8	4:20
10.	"Coke Ah Cola"	Stiff Valentine	3:08
11.	"Sirens and Satellites (Cultural Tourist Mix)"	Ego Likeness	5:25
12.	"Awake (Dream Kill Mix by Eye Kandy)"	Panic Lift	3:46
13.	"Best Revenge"	Shutterdown	4:25
14.	"Mind Decay (FGFC820 Remix)"	Kevorkian Death Cycle	5:33
15.	"Father Time"	Spider Lillies	4:08
16.	"Wrath of the Gods"	Angels On Acid	4:17
17.	"Terminal Condition (1999 Tour Version)"	Din_Fiv	4:28

Disc 3: Elation
No.	Title	Artist	Length
1.	"Fuse"	Christ Analogue	3:57
2.	"In a Perfect World (feat. Logic Division)"	Cynical Existence	4:04
3.	"Forever Never Ends (2013 Version)"	Battery Cage	4:37
4.	"Cocaine (GoFight Remix)"	Dead on TV	3:38
5.	"Guns + Drugs"	am.psych	3:27
6.	"Terminal"	Mordacious	3:55
7.	"Consequence (C7 Crucible Mix)"	Cesium 137	5:10
8.	"Taggart Terminal"	Boxed Warning	5:47
9.	"Hang Around (Saviour Mix)"	Inertia	4:59
10.	"A Strange Day (More Machine Than Man Remix)"	The Clay People	5:00
11.	"This Is Alive"	The Rain Within	4:50
12.	"A Nice Place To Visit (Syndroid Remix)"	Aesthetic Perfection	5:29
13.	"Under The Knife"	Sonik Foundry	5:06
14.	"Killing The Prophet (Mangadrive Remix)"	Cryogen Second	5:19
15.	"Timephase (Inertia Remix)"	Noir	5:06
16.	"Ready To Rock"	Toxic Coma	6:18

Disc 4: Joy
No.	Title	Artist	Length
1.	"Sins of the Flesh"	I:Scintilla feat. [Rein]Forced	5:06
2.	"Alternating Dilemmas (Edit)"	Cyanotic	4:54
3.	"Terminal Monster"	HexRx vs BlackOpz	3:40
4.	"Minerals (Eroded Remix)"	Mindless Faith	3:24
5.	"The One Beside Me"	Bella Morte	4:38
6.	"Deliverance"	Informatik	4:12
7.	"Your Memories"	Plasmodivm	5:31
8.	"Grimetown"	Deathproof	3:46
9.	"Stranger Than Fiction (Razed In Black Remix)"	More Machine Than Man	4:53
10.	"Night And Day (ES3 Mix)"	Berlin Babylon	4:38
11.	"Weak Machine (1.2 Remix)"	Blank	4:50
12.	"Take You Out"	Sensuous Enemy	4:07
13.	"Chemical Halo (Burnt Demo Version)"	Chemlab	4:36
14.	"This Isn't Happening (Remixed by Worms Of The Earth)"	Life Cried	6:48
15.	"Feel The Light"	Xiescive	3:48
16.	"Ruin"	XuberX	5:02
17.	"Nevermore 2.0"	Battery	3:30

Bonus Disc 5: Bliss
No.	Title	Artist	Length
1.	"Penetrate Your Soul (Facialized in Dirt Mix)"	The Dead Room	4:57
2.	"My Body, My Battlefield"	Tragic Impulse	4:29
3.	"Six In The Middle"	Vein Collector	4:57
4.	"This Final Memory"	Standard Issue Citizen	3:54
5.	"Thewhitelandsofempathica (Edit)"	Hopeful Machines	4:44
6.	"No Takebacks"	Antidote For Annie	4:44
7.	"Until Hate Do Us Part"	Skeptik V.5	4:17
8.	"Exteriority"	Transitional Override	3:00
9.	"Sky Punch"	Day Twelve	4:23
10.	"House Of Sorrow"	The Burning Path	4:14
11.	"Under the Flag"	Mechanical Cabaret	4:27
12.	"If Only (Chris Vrenna Remix)"	Dethcentrik	5:24
13.	"Die Heilung"	Short & Crunch	4:59
14.	"Bearing The Palm"	Man Woman Machine	4:33
15.	"Immortal"	Agnes Wired For Sound	5:00
16.	"RLFv3"	C2	4:20
17.	"End Of Wound"	Hexweapon	5:04

Bonus Disc 6: Cured
No.	Title	Artist	Length
1.	"BodyWar"	Icezeit	5:50
2.	"Set In Motion"	Mechanical Vein	4:34
3.	"Watch You Fall"	Dharmata 101	4:28
4.	"December Hovering Out (ES3 Mix)"	Becoming The Devourer	5:20
5.	"The Human Void"	Stoneburner	4:16
6.	"Wilderness Without You"	The Empty Stretcher	6:52
7.	"Loving Wrath (Apollo's Revenge Mix by Die Sektor)"	For All The Emptiness	5:12
8.	"Delicate Sound"	The Sedona Effect	3:43
9.	"Child's Play (That's Like a Baby's Toy Mix by Cyanotic)"	Short To Ground	5:24
10.	"Anything"	Dead Man'z Kassette	6:07
11.	"Dust Settles (Feat. MiXE1)"	Draconian Elimination Projects	4:14
12.	"Plastic Nurse"	Asylum Black	4:42
13.	"Kill It Now"	EMU-ART	3:59
14.	"Throwing Stones"	StarDotStar	5:07
15.	"Front Line (Project Rotten Remix)"	Frontal Boundary	5:32
16.	"Ghosts"	Venus In Furs	3:55

== Volume IV: Retaliation ==
Electronic Saviors Volume 4: Retaliation

Compilation album by Various Artists
- Released: June 10, 2016
- Genre: Industrial, electro-industrial
- Label: Metropolis Records

Electronic Saviors chronology
Electronic Saviors Volume 4: Retaliation (2016)	Electronic Saviors Volume 5: Remembrance (2018)

Volume 4 of Electronic Saviors marks the first time KMFDM has contributed to the series; included is a track that was never released on Nihil.

Disc 1
No.	Title	Artist	Length
1.	"Make Love"	KMFDM	4:48
2.	"Fury"	The Dark Clan	4:08
3.	"Legacy"	Ghostfeeder	4:39
4.	"Finally What You Wanted - Savior's Extended Mix"	Panic Lift	5:09
5.	"Parasite"	Deathline International	3:59
6.	"Wasted Time"	Rein-Forced, Interface	5:08
7.	"Deathtroopers"	Deathproof	3:18
8.	"Monochrome"	Mindless Faith	4:38
9.	"Silence is Speaking"	binary Park	4:28
10.	"Rewired - Intuition Remix"	Iris, Intuition	4:24
11.	"Dark Star"	More Machine Than Man	3:44
12.	"The Pain That You Like - Orange Sector Remix"	Suicide Commando, Jean-Luc Demeyer, Orange Sector	5:13
13.	"Hamberg - TraKKtor R3wwerKK"	Massive in Mensch, TraKktor	5:15
14.	"Plastic Soulmate"	Rodney Anonymous	3:03
15.	"Future is Mine"	Eurasianeyes	5:18
16.	"Adrent Ex Profvndis"	Cenotype

Disc 2
No.	Title	Artist	Length
1.	"Tlulaxa Flesh Merchant"	Stoneburner	3:53
2.	"Halation"	Am.Psych	3:31
3.	"Nightlife - Fear In Motion Edit"	Blutengel	4:03
4.	"Escape Velocity"	Ashbury Heights	4:54
5.	"Darkness - Out Out Remix"	Ego Likeness, Out Out	4:29
6.	"Into Your Girl"	Ghost & Writer	3:55
7.	"Hollywood Sunrise"	Blownload	4:17
8.	"How This Felt"	nolongerhuman	4:21
9.	"Malediction - Save Your Prayers Mix"	Shiv-R	4:06
10.	"Above the Sun - Augmented Club Mix"	Formalin	4:08
11.	"Speechless"	Redlokust	4:23
12.	"Coping Mechanisms - All Payne No Gain Edit"	Cyanotic	4:09
13.	"Bravery"	Coldkill	4:56
14.	"Climb into the Unknown"	Am Tierpark	4:40
15.	"Stormfront - All Hallows Mix"	Intertia	4:35
16.	"Perfect Patient"	K.P. Riot Brigade	4:32
17.	"Impossible - Remix"	Nueroactive	3:54
18.	"No Salvation - Remix"	Solitary Experiments	6:21

Disc 3
No.	Title	Artist	Length
1.	"E.L.Y."	Go Fight	4:12
2.	"My Promise"	Interface	4:55
3.	"12345 - Stoneburner Remix"	En Esch, Stoneburner	5:31
4.	"Disease"	Cancerface	4:47
5.	"Never Let the Light Fall"	Null Device	4:17
6.	"The Burning Bridge - Exclusive Extended Mix"	Noir	5:44
7.	"Beatlock"	Seeming	4:13
8.	"Marionette"	Spider Lilies	4:13
9.	"What Kind of Friend? - Republica Balkan bookie mix"	Tenek, Republica	5:03
10.	"Dressed Inside Your Fear - Sekul Mix"	Dope Stars Inc., Sekul	5:09
11.	"Going Down - Interlace Mix"	Seven Trees, Interlace	4:18
12.	"So Pretty"	Exageist	4:56
13.	"Face Them All - Dance Mix"	Iioioioii	4:49
14.	"Sacred Scars - Deep Cut Version"	Caustic	3:22
15.	"Falling Far - Below Zero"	Primitive Race	4:06
16.	"Violent Skin"	Cevello Elettronico	4:01
17.	"Rivers - Persistence Mix"	Black Volition	4:50

== Volume V: Remembrance ==
Electronic Saviors Volume 5: Remembrance

Compilation album by Various Artists
- Released: June 8, 2018
- Genre: Industrial, electro-industrial
- Label: Metropolis Records

Electronic Saviors chronology
Electronic Saviors Volume IV: Retaliation (2016)	Electronic Saviors Volume 5: Remembrance (2018)

Disc 1: Condolences
No.	Title	Artist	Length
1.	"Survive (Featuring The Rain Within)"	Fires	4:56
2.	"Recorded For MG Lewis (ES Mix)"	Ashbury Heights	4:32
3.	"We Don't Deserve Happiness"	Everything Goes Cold	4:06
4.	"Broken Instincts"	Trade Secrets	4:46
5.	"No Going Back (Forma Tadre Remix) (Forma Tadre Remix)"	Lionhearts	4:18
6.	"California (Wiccid Remix)"	Esther Black	5:20
7.	"You've Only Got One Life"	Androidgyny	4:26
8.	"Rhythm + Control (Third Realm Remix)"	Aesthetic Perfection	4:08
9.	"APOC"	Tragic Impulse	4:30
10.	"Escape"	Xentrifuge	4:56
11.	"Resurrector"	Caustic	3:17
12.	"Pleasure To Burn (FIRES Mix)"	Noir (19)	4:30
13.	"Those Aware"	Abbey Death	5:34
14.	"Virus (Resurrected)"	TraKKtor	5:26
15.	"Reality"	The Thought Criminals	4:01
16.	"Dashing Dame"	Deathproof	3:34
17.	"Icarus (The Blood Of Others Remix)"	iVardensphere*	4:40
