= Infinity (din fiv album) =

Studio album by din fiv
- Released: 1995
- Studio: Emergency Room (Boston, Massachusetts)
- Genre: Electro-industrial
- Length: 53:43
- Label: Sinless

din fiv chronology
Infinity (1995)	Escape to Reality (2000)

Infinity is the debut studio album of din fiv, released in 1995 by Sinless Records. The album was re-issued by Metropolis Records on compact disc in June 1996 and again as music downloads in 2009 and 2019.

== Track listing ==
All music is composed by David Din.

No.	Title	Length
1.	"Time of Death"	5:57
2.	"Piss Christ" (V2.0)	4:05
3.	"Control Group"	6:23
4.	"Ball & Chain"	5:28
5.	"Not Our Love"	4:27
6.	"Let It Go"	6:42
7.	"Terminal Condition"	4:33
8.	"Insanity Is Contagious"	6:26
9.	"Wasted on You"	4:22
10.	"Atonement"	5:21

== Personnel ==
Adapted from the Infinity liner notes.

din_fiv

- David Din (as Da5id Din) – vocals, recording, instruments, design

Production and design

- Susan Baltozer – cover art, illustrations, photography
- Informatik – mastering
- Shane Murray – cover art, illustrations, photography
- Dave Sherman – cover art, illustrations

== Release history ==
Region	Date	Label	Format	Catalog
United States	1995	Sinless	CD	SIN003
United States	1996	Metropolis	CD	MET 021
United States	2009	Metropolis	DL	MET 021
United States	2019	Metropolis	DL	MET 021
