= Daniel Edgar =

Daniel Edgar may refer to:

- Daniel Edgar (musician)
- Dan Edgar (born 1990), participant in reality show, The Only Way Is Essex
- Daniel Edgar, mayor of Palca District, Tarma
