= Dynasplint Systems =

Dynasplint Systems, Incorporated
- Company type: Privately held
- Founder: George R. Hepburn, PT
- Headquarters: Stevensville, Maryland (production facility), Severna Park, Maryland, United States
- Area served: USA, Canada, Netherlands, Germany
- Products: Dynamic splinting Range of motion rehabilitation equipment
- Number of employees: 150
- Divisions: Orthopedic; Neurological; Carpal Tunnel/Jaw; Veterinary; International
- Website: www.dynasplint.com

Dynasplint Systems, Incorporated (DSI) is a company that designs, manufactures and sells dynamic splints that are used for range of motion rehabilitation. The corporate headquarters are located in Severna Park, Maryland and it is considered a major employer in Anne Arundel County. Products are Made in the US in Stevensville, Maryland. There is a national sales force throughout the US as well as a presence in Canada and Europe.

== Background ==
Dynasplint was founded in 1981 by physical therapist, George R. Hepburn, PT and is the pioneer and recognized market leader in dynamic splinting. The need was recognized for longer periods of stretching to keep range of motion (ROM) gains made in therapy and to make further gains to resolve joint stiffness. In 1981, the Dynasplint was conceived to continue the work of the physical therapist at home.

This spring-loaded dynamic splint is worn at rest for six to eight hours at a time, and employs adjustable low load prolonged duration stretch technology (LLPS) to achieve a permanent change in shortened connective tissues. Conversely, when a joint is stretched quickly by high intensity short duration (HISD) some range of motion may be gained but rebounding will occur.

== Current uses ==
The appropriate patient for dynamic splinting has structural changes in the joint capsule such as shortened muscles, ligaments, tendons, and skin, as well as those who have adhesion formation. If passive range of motioned has been prescribed, then dynamic splinting may commence. Dynamic splinting is contraindicated If there is an unstable fracture, deep vein thrombosis (DVT) or a bone to bone end feel.

=== Orthopaedic diagnoses ===
In most orthopaedic cases, a trauma, surgery or condition paired with immobilization that has resulted in a loss of range of motion and joint stiffness. Common orthopaedic diagnoses are:

- Frozen shoulder
- Distal radius fracture such as Colles fracture, Hallux rigidus or limitus
- ACL reconstruction
- Plantar fasciitis
- Total Knee Replacement
- Open reduction internal fixation
- External fixation
- Rheumatoid arthritis
- Dupuytren's contracture
- Fracture
- Burn
- Rotator cuff tear
- Achilles tendon rupture
- Bunion surgery recovery
- Carpal Tunnel syndrome
- Temporomandibular joint disorder (TMJ disorder) or trismus, which is an involuntary contraction of the jaw muscle causing a restriction of the mouth opening, often seen in head and neck cancers.

=== Neurological diagnoses ===
Neurological disorder patients may have sustained trauma to the brain or a disease such as Multiple sclerosis, Cerebrovascular accident (CVA) or Stroke, Traumatic brain injury (TBI), and cerebral palsy and resultant Toe walking. The spring-loaded tension system safely accommodates a patient's tone and Spasticity by moving with the patient during episodes of resistance or spasms. When tone is challenged with a consistent, even force that fatigues the muscle and mentally relaxes the patient, the spring tension systems then bring the patient back to their end-range to continue a low-load, prolonged-duration stretch (LLPS).

Additional neurological diagnoses include:

- Spinal muscular atrophy (SMA)
- Arthrogryposis
- Muscular dystrophy (MD)
- Parkinson's disease
- Hypertonic muscle spasm
- Pierre Robin malformation

== Treatment ==
=== Types of splints ===
There are more than eighty Dynasplint Systems that stretch in extension and flexion of the elbow, wrist, hand, finger, knee, and toes, as well as dorsiflexion and plantarflexion of the foot and ankle, supination and pronation of the forearm, internal rotation and external rotation of the shoulder, as well as abduction and adduction of the fingers and toes.

=== Treatment protocol ===
While each patient is different, the average course of treatment is 3 to 4 months for an orthopedic case, and 8 months to a lifetime for a neurological patient. A physician orders a Dynasplint, and the patient is individually fit at either the doctor's office, physical therapy appointment or in the residential facility. The splint is used at rest, or overnight. The biomechanically correct tensioning is adjusted on both sides as range of motion gains occur. Time spent at end range vs. rapid increase in tension (force) allows for permanent length change.

== Veterinary division ==
The Equine/Camelid and Small Animal Dynasplint Systems aids in treating congenital and acquired angular and flexural deformities. Congenital deformities are present at birth, and acquired deformities develop at some stage of the growing period. Acquired deformities manifest differently depending on the age of the horse.

The Equine Dynasplint systems are also being integrated into treatments for laxity and suspensory ligament injuries. Suspensory ligament injuries are common in athletic horses. The suspensory apparatus includes the suspensory ligament that extends down from the back of the knee to the fetlock joint, the two sesamoid bones at the back of the fetlock joint, and the various ligaments connecting these bones to each other and to the pastern bone. These structures are crucial for supporting the horse's weight and acting as shock absorbers for the leg.

== Community outreach ==
=== Educational outreach ===
The George R. Hepburn Dynasplint Endowed Professorship in Physical Therapy and Rehabilitation Science was established on September 22, 2004, and is the first endowed professorship for physical therapy within the University of Maryland School of Medicine. The funds associated with the professorship serve to guarantee the ongoing operation of the Department of Physical Therapy and Rehabilitation Sciences by providing a permanent resource that is dedicated to this program.

=== Dynasplint Cares ===
Dynasplint Cares is the community outreach effort of Dynasplint Systems whose purpose statement is "to help restore people, business and life the way it ought to be." Activities are chronicled on Dynasplint.org and benefit environmental projects, military, medical research, and community needs.
