= Fibrodysplasia =

Fibrodysplasia may refer to:

- Fibrodysplasia ossificans progressiva, a rare disease in which fibrous tissue becomes ossified
- Fibromuscular dysplasia, a disease characterized by the fibrous thickening of the renal artery
- Fibrous dysplasia, a disease that causes growths or lesions in one or more bones of the human body
