= Dymeclin protein family =

Dymeclin

Identifiers
- Symbol: Dymeclin
- Pfam: PF09742
- Pfam clan: CL0456
- InterPro: IPR019142
Available protein structures:
- PDB: IPR019142 PF09742 (ECOD; PDBsum)
- AlphaFold: IPR019142; PF09742

In molecular biology, the Dymeclin protein family is a family of proteins which includes human Dymeclin. Dymeclin (Dyggve-Melchior-Clausen syndrome protein) contains a large number of leucine and isoleucine residues and a total of 17 repeated dileucine motifs. It is characteristically about 700 amino acids long and present in plants and animals. In humans, mutations in the gene coding for this protein give rise to a disorder called Dyggve-Melchior-Clausen syndrome, which is an autosomal-recessive disorder characterised by the association of spondylo-epi-metaphyseal dysplasia, postnatal onset microcephaly and intellectual disability.

This family of proteins also includes Hid1 (high-temperature-induced dauer-formation protein 1) from Caenorhabditis elegans which encodes a novel highly conserved putative transmembrane protein expressed in neurons. It contains up to seven potential transmembrane domains separated by regions of low complexity. Functionally this protein might be involved in vesicle secretion or be an inter-cellular signalling protein or be a novel insulin receptor.
