= 23rainydays =

American alternative, electronic, goth rock band

23RAINYDAYS (sometimes abbreviated 23RD) is an American alternative, electronic, goth rock band that formed during 2003 in Washington, DC. The band's current line-up is Ian Kaine MacGregor (vocals, guitar), Bryan Kimes (bass), Jonathan Lim (synthesizer), and Dennis Kapoyos (studio production and programming). While the band has never signed with a major label, they are well known among fans of the genre and best known for their songs "My Own Addiction" and "Goodnight & Goodbye.” 23RAINYDAYS was featured in Mick Mercer's book Music to Die For and was also selected as a Top 3 Breakout Artist by MTV in 2009.

== History ==
=== Beginnings (2003–2006) ===
As friends, MacGregor, bassist Ravi Rao, and drummer Eric Garwood had performed together in previous bands, garnering some recognition in Washington, DC and Richmond, VA. After some time apart, the trio regrouped as 23RAINYDAYS to record their first demo, “Under Blue Skies” in 2003. The band built a fan base rather quickly, opening for national acts Kill Hannah, Guided By Voices, and The Violent Femmes, and leveraging social media music sites of the time such as Myspace. They released a six-song EP, “The Ghost in You," in 2004. During this recording, the band refocused its naturally melancholy style into a heavier sound influenced by 80s alternative and glam bands, most notably The Cure.

From 2004–2006, the band underwent several lineup changes while it continued to perform and build a local fan base. Solidifying as a five-piece with the additions of Abe Elmazahi on guitar and Jonathan Lim on synthesizers, they continued to perform with headlining acts such as The 69 Eyes, Brett Scallions (Fuel), Bella Morte, Wednesday13, and others. The success of these shows and their growing audience led to a record label showcase at The Roxy in Los Angeles, CA. Upon their return to DC, they returned to writing and secured Dennis Kapoyos to produce their next EP.

=== 2006–2008 ===
In November 2006, 23RAINYDAYS released their second EP, “Broken Hearts Bleed Black." This material boasted radio-quality production and infused electronic elements not heard in previous recordings. The EP also featured the band's most popular song, “My Own Addiction." The recording in combination with constant touring resulted in the significant growth of the band's fan base, which allowed them to widen their touring circuit. They pushed further west into cities such as Chicago and Minneapolis in preparation for their first full US tour.

In October 2007, 23RAINYDAYS embarked on its first US tour. All members of the band cite their showcase performance at the Whisky a Go Go in Los Angeles as the standout show. Unfortunately, the tour was plagued with personal difficulties that resulted in the departure of guitarist Elmazahi and founding member, Ravi Rao. After returning home, the band was scheduled to record their full-length debut with producer Anthony "Santo" Santonocito in New York. The remaining members decided to continue with the recording while recruiting their previous producer, Dennis Kapoyos, to play bass. As Kapoyos began to contribute to the songwriting and production, the band invited him to become a permanent member. During the final phases of the release, bassist Bryan Kimes and drummer Brian Fasani joined 23RAINYDAYS to form a new five-piece lineup.

=== 2008–2009 ===
In March 2008, 23RAINYDAYS debuted their new lineup and first full-length CD, “From Today Until Forever.” Overall, the CD offered more guitar-driven rock songs with an emphasis on strong build-ups to the choruses, as evident in “Once a Hero,” "Fire In Tokyo," "My Fascination," and "Get a Gun.” Fan favorites "My Own Addiction" and "Ghost In You" were reconstructed to that effect compared to previous recordings. Meanwhile, the title track “From Today Until Forever” became the band's most electronic, dance-oriented song at the time. Along with the ballad, "Rest," they provided a balanced ending to the CD.

To accompany the record, the band also released its first professional music video for “The Haunt,” directed by Court Dunn of Restless Films. Their live debut took place at The Rock and Roll Hotel in Washington, D.C., as the supporting act for the Grammy-nominated hard rock band, RED. This was followed by another record label showcase in New York. This period marked significant improvements in the band's live performance and onstage production. While they maintained a busy touring schedule, they turned their focus on regional East Coast dates, including performances as the supporting act for goth/industrial mainstays, The Thrill Kill Kult. With a growing fan base and support from the local media, 23RAINYDAYS became recognized in the region.

In the summer of 2008, as the five-piece went back to the studio to further develop its blend of electronic and rock styles into new material, they were signed by the independent record label, Radio-Active-Music. Later that fall, the label re-released “From Today Until Forever” along with the band's next EP, “Wonderful Disaster.” The “Wonderful Disaster” EP featured four new songs and a dance remix of the popular “My Own Addiction.” The lead song, “Goodnight & Goodbye,” would become a fan favorite, while the dancefloor anthem, “Monster,” made its way to underground DJ playlists. Both releases were well received, especially by fans and reviewers of dark alternative music.

=== Present ===
In January 2009, 23RAINYDAYS was once again in transition after the departure of another band member. As Fasani moved on to play drums in other projects, the band leaned more heavily towards the electronic elements of its sound. Kapoyos also stepped back from touring to focus primarily on studio production. To reflect this new direction, they remixed selected tracks from previous sessions under the title, “Wonderful Disaster v2.” The resulting EP was also released under Radio-Active-Music. After a few successful shows, the band began to plan its second national tour, this time as an electronic three-piece for most live performances.

In March 2009, the band departed on its second coast-to-coast tour. The release of “Wonderful Disaster v2” pulled excellent reviews, while the tour was their most extensive to date. The performance at Reggie's Rock Club in Chicago and the homecoming finale at DC's Midnight goth/industrial event became the highlights of the tour. During this Time the band was also featured in the book "Music to Die For" by Mick Mercer. The book chronicled the history of dark music.

In August 2009, 23RAINYDAYS was named a Top 3 Breakout Artist by MTV, joining All Time Low and White Tie Affair on the MTV Video Music Awards tour. In October, the band released its sixth EP, “Instruments of Fashion and the Murder of Romance." While the band called it quits in 2010, their music continues to be played on internet and terrestrial radio all over the country. Their song "Monster" has also been added to the Metropolis Records box set "Electronic Saviours II" to be released in May, 2012.

== Discography ==
- Electronic Saviors Volume 2: Recurrence (Copyright 2012 Metropolis Records)
- Instruments of Fashion and the Murder of Romance (EP-Copyright 2009 Radio Active Music)
- Wonderful Disaster V2 (EP-Copyright 2009 Radio Active Music)
- Wonderful Disaster (EP-Copyright 2008 Radio Active Music)
- OnTap Magazine On The Verge Compilation (EP-Copyright 2008)
- From Today Until Forever (LP-Copyright 2008 Radio Active Music)
- Strangeland Records 2007 Compilation (Copyright 2007)
- Broken Hearts Bleed Black (EP-Copyright 2006 GothGlam Records)
- The Ghost in You (LP-Copyright 2005 GothGlam Records)
- Electrolush (EP-Copyright 2004 GothGlam Records)
- Under Blue Skies (EP-Copyright 2003 GothGlam Records)

== Members ==
- Ian Kaine MacGregor Vocals, Guitar (2003–Present)
- Eric Garwood Drums (2003–2006)
- Ravi Rao Bass (2003–2007)
- Kenny Kelly Guitar (2004)
- Abe Elmazahi Guitar (2005–2007)
- Jonathan Lim Synthesizers/Keyboards (2006–Present)
- Trevin Skeens Drums (2006)
- Sam Murray Drums (2007)
- Dennis Kapoyos Guitar/Bass/Production (2007–Present)
- Brian Fasani Drums (2007–2008)
- Bryan Kimes Bass (2007–Present)
