= Radio-Active-Music =

American independent record label

Radio-Active-Music was an independent record label founded in 2004 and based in Washington DC. Radio-Active-Music releases and distributes bands in the goth and industrial genres. It ceased operations in 2012.

== Overview ==
Radio-Active-Music was a home to approximately two dozen artists, including Hopeful Machines (a side-project of Ego Likeness), XUBERX, 23RAINYDAYS, Gravity Euphonic, Third Realm, and Heretics in the Lab. Radio-Active-Music was distributed by Super D One Stop, and COP International.
