= Din fiv =

din_fiv
- Origin: San Francisco, California, United States
- Genres: Electro-Industrial
- Years active: 1990–present
- Labels: Sinless; Metropolis
- Spinoff of: Informatik
- Past members: David Din

din_fiv (or Din Fiv) was the music project founded of San Francisco-based composer David Din (Da5id Din). Din was known as a frequent member of the Boston industrial music duo Informatik. He released two albums under his din_fiv moniker Infinity and Escape To Reality, which were issued by Metropolis Records.

== History ==
din_fiv was founded in 1990 out of San Francisco as a solo outlet for composer David Din of Informatik. His first solo composition for the project, titled "Terminal Condition", was provided to the compilations There Is No Time released by Ras Dva in 1994 and The Art of Brutality released by Arts Industria in 1995. Din released his 1995 debut studio album titled Infinity on Sinless Records. It represented Din's return to the electro-based music and was compared favorably to Informatik's first album. Metropolis Records adopted din_fiv into its roster and re-issued the debut in 1996 and again in 2009. A second album followed in 2000 titled Escape to Reality. The album peaked at number fifteen on CMJ's top dance releases and was commended for its provocative lyrics and intense music. Metropolis re-issued both studio albums on Bandcamp as a music download in 2019.

== Discography ==
Studio albums

- Infinity (1995, Sinless)
- Escape to Reality (2000, Metropolis)
