= Escape to Reality =

Studio album by din fiv
- Released: May 23, 2000
- Studio: Corrosive Audio (San Francisco, California)
- Genre: Electro-industrial
- Length: 52:52
- Label: Metropolis

din fiv chronology
Infinity (1995)	Escape to Reality (2000)

Escape to Reality is the second studio album by din fiv, released on May 23, 2000, by Metropolis Records. The album was re-issued by Metropolis Records on compact disc in June 1996 and again as music downloads in 2009 and 2019.

== Reception ==
Professional ratings
Review scores
Source	Rating
AllMusic	2.5/5 stars

Kenyon Hopkin of AllMusic said if "it weren't for the coasting strings in the background of every track, Escape to Reality may have wound up as an average entry in industrial dance" and that "it functions as a cold yet soothing texture that brings a full sound to din fiv's second release. Industrial Reviews awarded the album four out of five stars and praised Din's ability to merge complex and multi-layered synthesizers created atmospheres while maintaining a strong sense of unity and melody throughout the album. Last Sigh Magazine praised the production quality and said "the music is rather simple, basslines are strong and powerful, and there are plenty of effects." Metal.de commended the music for having memorable vocal lines and samples and called the album typical for its genre. Sonic Boom criticized the album for sounding monotonous and called it "an album that remains very consistent and flat without much deviation outside the standard electro model" and "in most cases, this doesn't inherently a negative issue, but in this case it is extremely difficult to locate a track that stands out from the rest on this album." The album peaked at number fifteen on CMJ New Music Monthly's top dance releases in 2000.

== Track listing ==
All music is composed by David Din.

No.	Title	Length
1.	"Through the Looking Glass"	6:11
2.	"We Are"	5:39
3.	"Conspiracy"	6:01
4.	"I Say"	4:50
5.	"Escape"	3:54
6.	"Live for Today"	6:06
7.	"Cataclysm"	5:12
8.	"Infinite Paths"	5:18
9.	"We Are" (Deathguild Remix by Battery)	4:03
10.	"Terminal Condition" (Guilt Central Station Remix by AEC)	5:37

== Accolades ==
Year	Publication	Country	Accolade	Rank
2000	CMJ New Music Monthly	United States	"Top 25 Dance"	15
"*" denotes an unordered list.

== Personnel ==
Adapted from the Escape to Reality liner notes.

din_fiv

- David Din (as Da5id Din) – vocals, instruments, engineering

Additional performers

- Adam Jensen – additional production
- Jason Macierowski – guitar (10)
- Tyler Newman – remixer (10)
- Evan Sornstein – engineering and remixer (9), cover art, illustrations, design

Production and design

- Josh Greco – engineering (10)
- Susan Jennings – photography

== Release history ==
Region	Date	Label	Format	Catalog
United States	2000	Metropolis	CD	MET 146
United States	2009	Metropolis	DL	MET 146
United States	2019	Metropolis	DL	MET 146
