= RAB33B =

Protein-coding gene in the species Homo sapiens

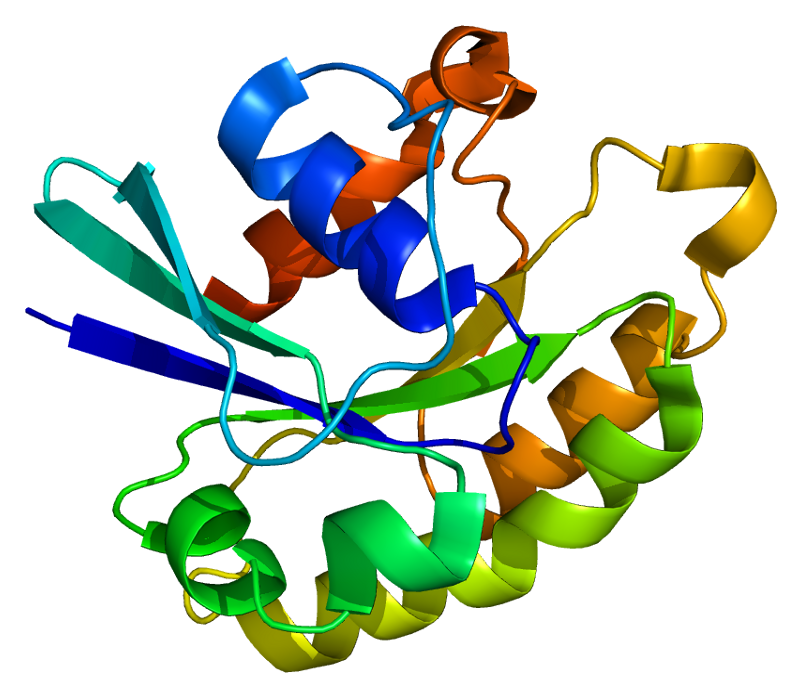

Identifiers
- Aliases: RAB33B, SMC2, member RAS oncogene family
- External IDs: OMIM: 605950; MGI: 1330805; GeneCards: RAB33B
Enzyme activity
EC #	BRENDA	ExPASy	KEGG	MetaCyc
3.6.5.2	↗	↗	↗	↗

Gene location (Human)
Chr.	Chromosome 4 (human)
Band	4q31.1	Start	139,453,232 bp
Band	4q31.1	End	139,476,609 bp

Gene location (Mouse)
Chr.	Chromosome 3 (mouse)
Band	3|3 C	Start	51,391,341 bp
Band	3|3 C	End	51,403,653 bp
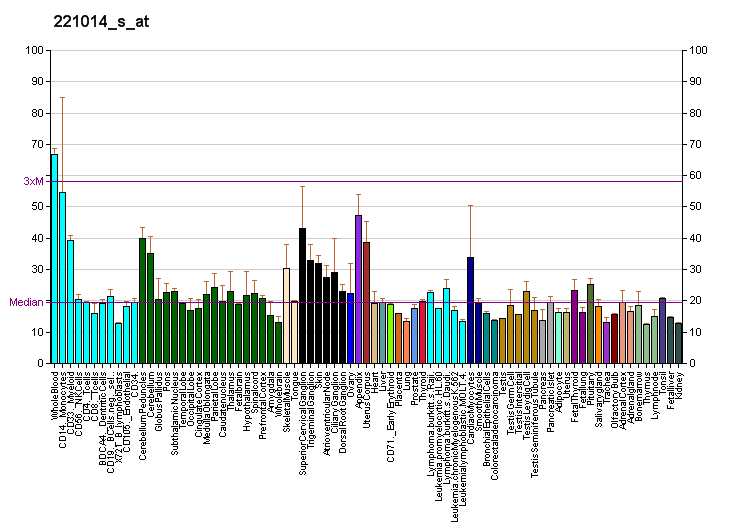
RNA expression pattern
Bgee	Human / Mouse (ortholog); Top expressed in: Achilles tendon; saphenous vein; urethra; Region I of hippocampus proper; subthalamic nucleus; synovial joint; lateral nuclear group of thalamus; dorsal motor nucleus of vagus nerve; inferior olivary nucleus; superficial temporal artery / Top expressed in: transitional epithelium of urinary bladder; sciatic nerve; Ileal epithelium; iris; trigeminal ganglion; median eminence; ureter; vas deferens; medullary collecting duct; condyle; More reference expression data
BioGPS	More reference expression data
Gene ontology
Molecular function	protein binding; nucleotide binding; GTP binding; GTPase activity
Cellular component	membrane; Golgi lumen; Golgi apparatus; Golgi membrane; presynapse; endoplasmic reticulum membrane
Biological process	negative regulation of constitutive secretory pathway; regulation of Golgi organization; intra-Golgi vesicle-mediated transport; regulation of epithelial cell proliferation; regulation of retrograde vesicle-mediated transport, Golgi to ER; protein transport; skeletal system morphogenesis; autophagy; regulation of cell growth; autophagosome assembly; regulation of autophagosome assembly; protein localization to Golgi apparatus; intracellular protein transport; endoplasmic reticulum to Golgi vesicle-mediated transport; Rab protein signal transduction
Sources:Amigo / QuickGO
Orthologs
Databases	NCBI: entry; OMA: entry
Species	Human	Mouse
Entrez	83452	19338
Ensembl	ENSG00000172007	ENSMUSG00000027739
UniProt	Q9H082	O35963
RefSeq (mRNA)	NM_031296	NM_016858
RefSeq (protein)	NP_112586	NP_058554
Location (UCSC)	Chr 4: 139.45 – 139.48 Mb	Chr 3: 51.39 – 51.4 Mb
PubMed search
- Wikidata
View/Edit Human	View/Edit Mouse

Ras-related protein Rab-33B is a protein that in humans is encoded by the RAB33B gene.

Mutations in this gene have been associated to cases of Dyggve-Melchior-Clausen syndrome.
