= Ex vivo reconstruction =

Surgical technique

Ex vivo reconstruction, short for ex vivo renal artery reconstruction and autotransplantation, is a technique mainly used for complex disease involving multiple segmental branches in patients with fibromuscular dysplasia. In ex vivo reconstruction, temporary nephrectomy and ex vivo repair with microvascular techniques followed by autotransplantation allows the precise repair of such lesions.
