= Wunderlich syndrome =

- Other names: Double uterus-hemivagina-renal agenesis syndrome
- This condition is inherited in an autosomal dominant manner
- Specialty: Nephrology

Wunderlich syndrome can refer to one of several conditions. One condition called Wunderlich syndrome is spontaneous, nontraumatic kidney bleeding confined to the subcapsular and perirenal space. It may be the first manifestation of a renal angiomyolipoma (AML), or the rupture of a renal artery or intraparenchymal aneurysm. The renal condition should not be confused with other conditions which are Müllerian duct anomalies, such as Herlyn-Werner-Wunderlich syndrome. Some sources refer to double uterus-hemivagina-renal agenesis as simply Wunderlich syndrome, but Herlyn-Werner-Wunderlich is a better term to distinguish the two.

== Presentation ==
Patients may present with various symptoms ranging from abdominal pain to more severe manifestations such as hypovolemic shock. The classic symptom complex of flank pain, and flank mass, and hypovolemic shock is referred to as the Lenk triad and is seen in a small subset of patients.

== Cause ==
Neoplasms are the most common underlying pathology in up to 60% of cases and include renal angiomyolipoma and renal cell carcinoma. Other causes include rupture of renal artery or an arteriovenous malformation, polyarteritis nodosa, cystic medial necrosis, segmental arterial mediolysis, and cystic rupture.

== Diagnosis ==
Initial symptoms may be subtle, such as mild pain, flank tenderness, hematuria. Depending on blood loss, symptoms of hypovolemic shock may develop. Hematoma is usually contained in the retroperitoneum, allowing for a period of hemodynamic stability. Sometimes, massive acute hemorrhage is seen when a hematoma ruptures Gerota's fascia and extends into the peritoneum. An ultrasound or CT scan can establish diagnosis, while lab tests may be inconclusive as changes of hematocrit or hemoglobin are not specific to the syndrome, while hematuria is not always present.

== Treatment ==
Treatment varies according to severity, ranging from monitoring of the hematoma (in hemodynamic stability) to emergency surgery (when patients develop hypovolemic shock requiring seminephrectomy or nephrectomy). Vascular causes lead to surgery due to severity of hemorrhage or to catheter-based endovascular treatment - for example embolisation. Robotic-assisted partial nephrectomy has been proposed as a surgical treatment of a ruptured angiomyolipoma causing retroperitoneal hemorrhage, combining the advantages of a kidney preservation procedure and the benefits of a minimally invasive procedure without compromising the safety of the patient.
