= Panic Lift =

American electronic music band

- Origin: Newark, New Jersey, U.S.
- Genres: Electro-industrial
- Years active: 2006–present
- Labels: Noise Filter Productions; Hive Records; NoiTekk; Deathwatch Asia; Black Rain; Metropolis Records
- Members: James Francis; Dan Platt; Justice Burke; Michael J. Carrasquillo
- Past members: Brad Brunet; Gus Yoo; Tom Zagorski; Ben Tourkantonis; Cristian Carver

Panic Lift is an electro-industrial band from Newark, New Jersey, United States, comprising James Francis on vocals, Dan Platt on keyboards, Justice Burke on bass and Michael J. Carrasquillo on drums.

== Reception ==
Panic Lift's second album Witness To Our Collapse attracted attention in the German music press, where it was called "a successful disc" with "good songwriting" and "variety", and noted as "definitely worth listening to".

== Discography ==
=== Releases ===
- Dancing Through The Ashes, 2006, Noise Filter Productions
- Initialize (EP with genCAB), 2008, Hive Records
- Witness To Our Collapse, 2008, Hive Records
- "Witness To Our Collapse", 2008, Noitekk Records
- "Witness To Our Collapse (Japanese Limited Edition)", 2009, Deatwatch Asia
- "Is This Goodbye", 2012, Metropolis Records
- "Is This Goodbye (Deluxe)", 2012, Metropolis Records
- "Awake" (EP), 2014, Metropolis Records
- "Everyday Is Halloween", 2014, Not On Label (Panic Lift Self Released)
- "Paper Mask" (EP), 2016, Metropolis Records
- "Skeleton Key", 2016, Metropolis Records
- "Skeleton Key (Deluxe)", 2016, Not On Label (Panic Lift Self Released)
- "This Poison Remains" (EP), 2017, Metropolis Records
- "From Blue To Black", 2017, Not On Label (Panic Lift Self Released)
- "End Process", 2018, Metropolis Records

=== Appearances ===
- Futronik Structures Vol. 5 (compilation), 2007 DSBP
- "Hazmat (2) - 4 Point Remixes" (remix), 2007 Primordial Music
- "Interbreeding IX: Kuru" (compilation), 2007, BLC Productions
- a compilation Vol 3. (compilation), 2008 Deathwatch Asia, Black Rain
- "Orkus Compilation 45" (compilation), 2008, Orkus
- "You Are Here: A Compilation Of New York Electronics" (compilation), 2008, Connexion Bizarre
- "Everything Goes Cold - Prepare To Be Refrigerated" (remix), 2008, Sonic Mainline Records
- "Neuroplague - Altered" (remix), 2008, Primordial Music
- United Vol. 2 (compilation), 2009, NoiTekk
- "Black Snow - The Completely Different Xmas Compilation" (compilation), 2009, Black Rain
- "Cenotype - Origins Unfold" (remix), 2009, Origins Productions
- "CeDigest - Walking In The Flesh" (remix), 2010 Deathwatch Asia
- Triton Festival 2010 (compilation), 2010 Artoffact Records
- "Direct World Action For Japan" (compilation), 2011, Deathwatch Asia
- "Aesthetic Perfection-Inhuman EP" (remix), 2011, Metropolis Records
- "Electro Pop Volume 2" (compilation), 2011, ZYX Music
- "Aderlass Gothic & Electro Club Selections Volume 8" (compilation), 2012, Nachtaktiv
- "FGFC820-Homeland Insecurity, Relapse" (remix), 2012, COP International
- "Electronic Saviors Volume 2: Recurrence" (compilation), 2012, Metropolis Records
- "Orkus! Compilation 84" (compilation), 2012, Orkus
- "Zillo CD 11/2012" (compilation), 2012, Zillo
- "Kinetik Festival Volume 5.5" (compilation), 2013, Artoffact Records
- "Gothsicles feat. Panic Lift-Terminus Festival Is Gonna Be Awesome" (collaboration), 2013
- "Rein[Forced]-Pre-Existing Conditions" (remix), 2013, WTII Records
- "Inertia-Lies EP" (remix), 2013, Metropolis Records
- "Electronic Saviors Volume 3: Remission" (compilation), 2014, Metropolis Records
- "Cyferdyne-Fracture EP" (remix), 2015, Tunecore
- "Ego Likeness-New Religion EP" (remix), 2015, Metropolis Records
- "Silverwalks-Tidal EP" (remix), 2016, Metropolis Records
- "Electronic Saviors Volume 4" (compilation), 2016, Metropolis Records
- "FIRES-Morning Tide Grey" (Remix), 2017, Metropolis Records
- "Noir-Reburning, The Burning Bridge" (remix), 2017, Metropolis Records
- "Surgyn-Green Heart" (remix), 2017, Deathwatch Asia
- "Grendel-Age Of The Disposable Body, Far Away" (remix), 2017, Metropolis Records
- Electronic Saviors Volume 5 (compilation), 2018 Metropolis Records
- "Methodical-Not My World" (remix), 2019, Not On Label (Methodical Self Release)
- "Big Time Kill-Body Talk" (remix), 2019, Not On Label (Big Time Kill self release)
- "Mechanical Vein-TAKN feat. Caustic" (remix), 2021, Not On Label (Mechanical Vein self release)
