= Gravity Euphonic =

Gravity Euponic
- Origin: Fort Worth, Texas, U.S.
- Genres: Industrial metal, industrial rock
- Years active: 2005–present
- Label: Radio-Active-Music (2009–present) Independent (2005–2009) (2012–present)
- Members: Eric Hunter (2005–present); Jamie French (2005–2007)(2009–present); Orion Quest (2011–present)
- Past members: Justin McKimmey (2007–2009); Brian Timmons (2005–2006); Perry Taylor (2005)
- Website: https://www.gravityeuphonic.net/

Gravity Euphonic is an industrial metal/industrial rock band from Fort Worth, Texas.

== History ==
Gravity Euphonic is Eric Hunter, Jamie French and Orion Quest. Eric Hunter started making music in 1995 with vocalist, Justin McKimmey. In 2005, Gravity Euphonic was born and their project evolved into the industrial rock/industrial metal driven sound that can be heard today. The band's sound includes heavy orchestration, distorted synthesizers, electronic drums and electric guitar.

In 2006, several line-up changes took place as the band recorded the Secret EP. McKimmey left the band and was replaced with vocalist/multi-instrumentalist, Jamie French. Upon the EP's release, one reviewer described the album as a "new and exciting revival of electronica or industrial pop music", while another pointed out the questionably over-produced sound of the album, asking the question, "should I be giggling or dancing?"

Following the short tour that accompanied Secret, McKimmey returned to the band as vocalist and Gravity Euphonic released their full-length album, Sunlight Kills in 2007. The album, described as "a solid collection of energetic dance mixes and hard driving industrial beats" was followed up with a second tour of the east coast of the US.

In late 2008, the band announced that they had signed to the independent music label, Radio-Active-Music. Shortly afterwards in April, 2009, Gravity Euphonic announced Jamie French's return to the band through the first installment of their Future News from the Future News video series. The band would continue to use the Future News videos to announce news for upcoming tour dates the upcoming self-titled record, Gravity Euphonic, which would be released in September of the same year.

The album, Gravity Euphonic was described by the band's label as "laid-back angst-laden industrial rock". The reviewers disagreed however, and called the album "solidly awesome without any pretence" while another said that Gravity Euphonic "lends an animalistic primevalness to what is usually a more refined and technological genre".

== Discography ==
=== Albums ===
- The Lost - Volume 1 (2010)
- Gravity Euphonic - (2009)
- Sunlight Kills - (2007)
- Secret - (2006)

=== Compilation appearances ===
- Lockout 2008 (Radio-Active-Music - 2008) "Dance or Die – Bardo in Motion Remix" "Tragedy"
- In Memoriam: Kairi Mais (Radio-Active-Music - 2009) "Tragedy 2009"
- Radio-Active-Music Label Sampler 2010 (Radio-Active-Music - 2010) "Livid All Along"
- GCS 1 (COMA Music Magazine - 2011) "Brace Leg (Demo)"

== Music videos ==
- Livid All Along - (5/23/2010)
- Brace Leg -(6/24/2010)

== See also ==
- Industrial metal
- Industrial rock
- Electronic music
