= Dyggve–Melchior–Clausen Syndrome =

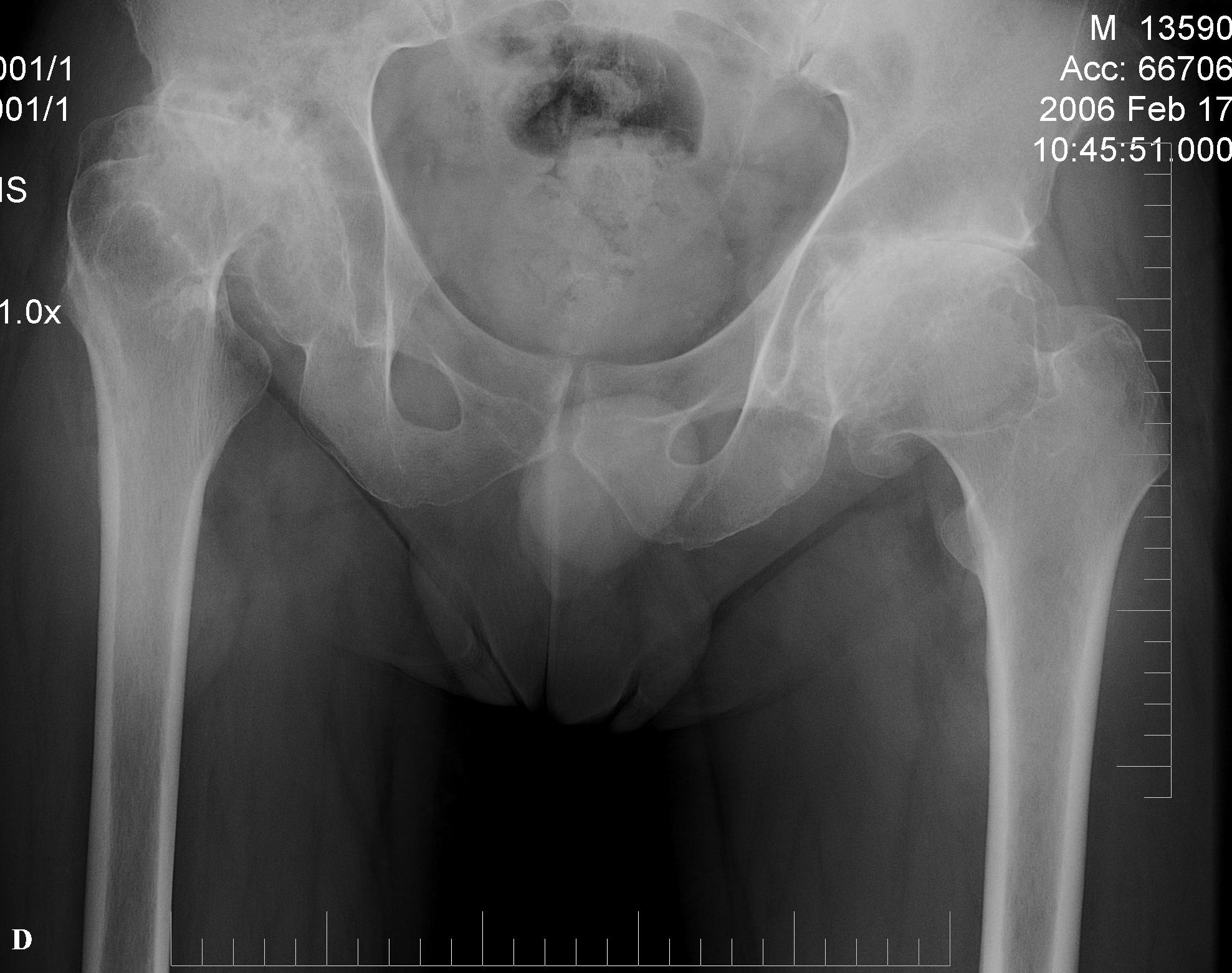
An x-ray showing subluxation at the pelvic bones of the hips.

Dyggve-Melchior-Clausen (DMC) Syndrome is a rare autosomal recessive disorder that stunts skeletal and intellectual development. Individuals with this disorder often present with a shorter stature, minimal or decreased joint mobility, deformities of the spine, and microcephaly. Individuals with this disorder exhibit varying degrees of intellectual disability, with some individuals being impacted more severely than others.

DMC syndrome originates from mutations in the DYM gene, which encodes a protein crucial for bone and cartilage development and contributes to cognitive impairments. Mutations in the RAB33B gene also contribute to DMC syndrome, though not as much as it seems to only affect skeletal development.

DMC syndrome was first observed in 1962, when three out of eight children in a family presented with symptoms. These children were the result of an incestuous relationship between their parents; their father was their mother's paternal uncle. Initially misdiagnosed as Morquio-Ullrich disease (Morquio syndrome) due to the presence of acid mucopolysaccharides in the urine, DMC syndrome was later classified as a disorder of its own.

While there is no cure for this disorder, treatments are heavily focused on the skeletal aspect, generally through orthopedic interventions and various orthopedic surgeries. Additional, long-term care such as ongoing physical therapy and social work assistance is also given to improve the affected individual's quality of life. With proper treatment and support, those with DMC syndrome are typically able to live healthily into adulthood.

== Symptoms and clinical presentation ==
DMC syndrome is a progressive genetic disorder with some clinical presentation at birth. Major symptoms include abnormal skeletal development and mild to severe intellectual disabilities. DMC syndrome is categorized as an osteochondrodysplasia.

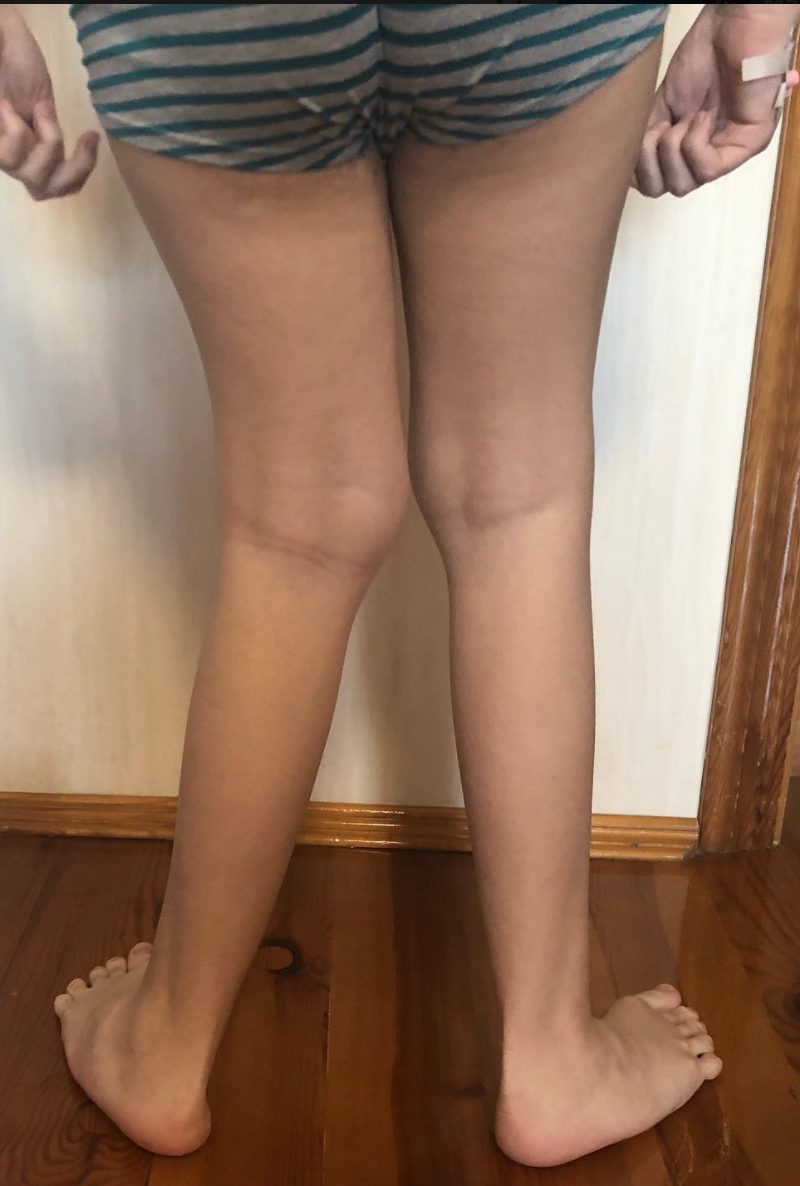
An individual displaying genu valgum.

The first symptoms appear in newborns, which are slightly shorter in body length. They become progressively more noticeable as a child ages, with more skeletal deformities presenting before 18 months of age. Abnormal skeletal development can present as progressive dwarfism, a barrel-shaped chest, rhizomelic limb shortening, dolichocephaly, microcephaly, coarse facial features, spondyloepiphyseal dysplasia, genu valgum, genu varum, and prognathism. In addition to skeletal changes, individuals affected by DMC syndrome have a range of intellectual disabilities.

As individuals with DMC syndrome age, skeletal changes can cause challenges, potentially requiring surgery to improve quality of life. These secondary symptoms include spinal compression, dislocated hips, reduced mobility/range of motion, scoliosis, lumbar lordosis, thoracic kyphosis, and subluxation. Secondary symptoms can appear as early as adolescence and will persist throughout an individual's life.

Despite the wide range of symptoms, individuals with DMC syndrome generally live healthy adult lives.

== Genetics and molecular basis ==
DMC syndrome is an autosomal recessive disorder linked to mutations in the DYM gene which is located on chromosome 18q12 and the RAB33B gene, located on chromosome 4q31.1. It is closely related to Smith-McCort dysplasia (SMC), which shares identical skeletal abnormalities but lacks the intellectual disability that is characteristic of DMC. Linkage studies have established that both conditions are allelic, suggesting a common genetic basis.

=== Underlying genetic mutations ===
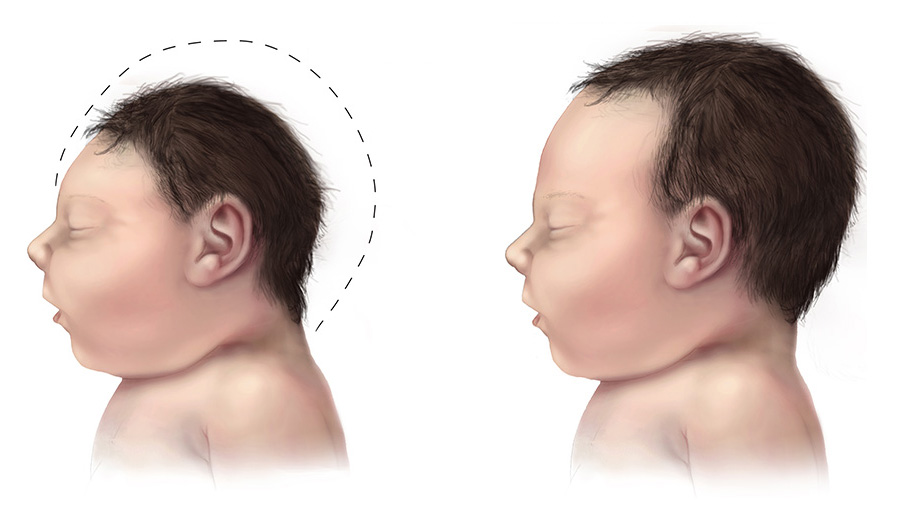
Diagram of an infant with microcephaly compared to a typical infant.

The DYM gene encodes dymeclin (DYM), a protein involved in intracellular transport and Golgi apparatus function, which is critical for proper cartilage and bone development. The K626N mutation in DYM is associated with both DMC and SMC. Mutations in DYM lead to defective protein function, impairing chondrocyte organization and differentiation, ultimately resulting in the skeletal abnormalities observed in both disorders. Linkage mapping studies in consanguineous families identified 1.5-centimorgan (cM) interval on chromosome 18q12.

Mutations in RAB33B, have also been linked to DMC. The RAB33B gene encodes a GTP-binding protein from the family of Rab GTPases. It regulates Golgi trafficking, assisting with vesicle transport and protein movement within the cell.

=== Inheritance patterns ===
DMC follows an autosomal recessive inheritance pattern; affected individuals inherit one pathogenic copies of the DYM gene from each parent. Carrier parents are typically asymptomatic and have a 50% chance of passing the mutated allele to their offspring.

=== Impact on proteins and biological pathways ===
Defects in dymeclin disrupt normal cartilage formation. Histological studies of affected individuals have revealed abnormal chondrocyte columnization, poor endochondral ossification, and wavy bone deposition, which contribute to the distinctive skeletal phenotype.

Mutations in RAB33B gene disrupt normal Golgi function, resulting in skeletal abnormalities found in both DMC and SMC.

== Treatment and management ==
Treatment mainly involves addressing the symptoms and providing supportive care. Management focuses on handling its progressive skeletal abnormalities, preventing complications, and providing supportive care. Since the disorder affects multiple aspects of musculoskeletal development, treatment typically involves orthopedic interventions, surgical procedures, and long-term mobility support.

=== Orthopedic management ===
Patients with DMC require regular orthopedic follow-up to monitor and manage mobility difficulties and spinal abnormalities, particularly atlantoaxial instability, which can lead to spinal cord compression if untreated. Procedures like spinal fusion or other stabilization methods are usually recommended if the cervical spine is affected, such as with hypoplasia in the odontoid process or partial cervical vertebral dislocation. These are typically used to protect the cervical spinal cord and prevent weakness or paralysis. Surgical interventions may be used to address other skeletal abnormalities, including shoulder and hip joint dislocations or subluxations. In some cases, hip replacement surgery is necessary to manage severe hip degeneration. Patients may also need orthopedic procedures such as early meniscectomy or posterior cervical spine fusion.

For hip dysplasia, various treatment options and surgical procedures have been explored, including realignment of the proximal femur and/or acetabulum, realignment osteotomy, cheilectomy, and in more advanced cases, total hip replacement. Studies suggest that osteotomies, including femoral and pelvic osteotomies, often fail to prevent the progression of hip subluxation and femoral head migration and may lead to progressive degeneration of the hip joint.

=== Lifestyle and supportive care ===
Due to the progressive nature of the disorder, ongoing physical care and mobility support are essential. For preoperative planning, imaging techniques such as CT scans and 3D reconstructions are advised to assess complex skeletal deformities, especially hip abnormalities, and ensure proper surgical planning. Stable implant fixation may be required due to dwarfism and unique skeletal anatomy, further allowing for the success of the surgery for optimal surgical outcomes, particularly for total hip arthroplasties.

Attention to postoperative rehabilitation, including physical therapy, is vital to ensure functional recovery, especially in children undergoing total hip replacement. Additionally, social work support is often crucial and requires in-home care and additional family assistance to assist with daily living activities due to intellectual disability and mobility challenges.

Approaches such as early intervention and special education programs may help in the development and support growth of children with DMC. Affected individuals and their families may also benefit from genetic counselling.

== Epidemiology and public health ==
=== Prevalence and incidence ===
Approximately 100 cases of DMC syndrome have been reported globally, with a prevalence of less than 1 in 1,000,000.

Due to its autosomal recessive inheritance pattern, populations with high consanguinity have an increased prevalence of DMC, with a 25% risk of transmission when both parents are unaffected carriers. Therefore, it is recommended that affected individuals and their families undergo genetic counselling, especially in populations where the disorder is more prevalent due to founder effects. To date, cases have been reported across a variety of ethnic groups, with at least 16 different Dymeclin mutations identified in at least 21 unrelated families. These mutations appear to be influenced by founder effects in specific regions, including Morocco, Lebanon, Egypt, and Guam.

DMC syndrome manifests during infancy, typically within the first 18 months.

=== Challenge for public health ===
DMC presents identical symptoms as Smith-McCort features (SMC), with the only differences being the presence of intellectual deficiencies and microcephaly in DMC. Both SMC and DMC associated with mutations in the same gene, which complicates proper diagnosis.
