= Monody (band) =

- Monody band logo, circa 2008 (used with permission)

Background information
- Origin: Portland, Oregon, United States
- Genres: Futurepop; Synthpop; EBM
- Years active: 2006–present
- Label: [Distortion Productions https://www.distortionprod.com/]
- Members: David Battrick, Geoff Tripoli, Daniel Edgar
- Website: https://www.monodyweb.com/

Monody is a 3-member synthpop / EBM / Futurepop band from the United States.

== History ==
- Formed in 2006 in Portland, Oregon.
- In 2008, Monody released 4 debut singles entitled: 'Bound', 'Absent', 'Ceti Lullaby', and 'In Between'.
- On January 24 2008, Monody was featured in an Oregon Public Broadcasting segment on the construction in Portland, Oregon. Daniel Edgar (member) was recognized for using various construction sounds in a number of Monody songs. The song 'Beneath Andromeda' was featured in the segment.
- Monody opened for Obscenity Trial (band) and Spetsnaz (band) at the Portland stop of their 2008 US tour on November 25, 2008.
- On March 8 2009, an interview with Monody was posted on the Portland music guide, Evy Metal. The interview covers topics such as their musical background, writing process, and live performances.
- Remote Music, the German electronic music label, announced that Monody joined their roster on July 3, 2009
- Monody contributed their "Irradiated Mix" remix of the song "In Between" on May 8 2012 to the Electronic Saviors Volume 2 compilation released on Metropolis Records.
- On June 21 2015, 2 clips of Monody's songs were used in the "Beirut" episode of the show "Anthony Bourdain: Parts Unknown". The songs featured were "Ceti Lullaby" (at 30:18) and "Absent" (at 38:00) both from the "Of Iron and Clay" album.
- In celebration of the "Of Iron and Clay" album's 10th anniversary, on April 29 2021 Monody released an instrumental version of the album titled "Of Iron and Clay: Voiceless". This was a digital-only release, available for purchase or streaming on various platforms.
- On October 10 2022, Monody announced that they joined the Distortion Productions label, and would be releasing a new EP.
- On November 11 2022, Monody released their "Subtle Dissent" EP. This release featured four new original songs, a cover of "The Boxer" by Simon and Garfunkel, and remixes by Eisfabrik and Particle Son. This was a digital-only release, available for purchase or streaming on various platforms.
- On November 22 2022, Monody's song "Eye To Eye" was reviewed by the international synthpop magazine Electrozombies.
- On December 1 2023, Monody released their "A Safe Place" EP. This release featured four new original songs and a remix by Krischan Wesenberg of the band Rotersand. This was a digital-only release, available for purchase or streaming on various platforms.
- On December 30 2023, Monody's song "A Safe Place" was reviewed by the international synthpop magazine Electrozombies.
- On February 21 2025, Monody released their "Abandoned Wisdom" EP. This release featured four new original songs and remixes by Geoff Pinckney, Red Lokust, and Crane11. This was a digital-only release, available for purchase or streaming on various platforms.

== Personnel ==
=== Current members ===
- Geoff Tripoli – lead vocals, lyrics
- David Battrick – drums, electronic percussion
- Daniel Edgar – synths, composition, engineering, production

== Member Biographies ==
=== Geoff Tripoli ===
Geoff comes from a musical background somewhat unlike the Monody sound. He started with piano lessons as a child and on to the electric guitar as a teenager. He was a member of a couple rock bands over the years, but his true passion comes from building on his home studio and becoming a skilled engineer and producer of his own and other musicians' projects. His ongoing side project, Entium, occasionally releases tracks that are on the electronica side of things. Geoff's vocal influences include artists like Dave Gahan, Jean-Luc De Meyer and Peter Murphy.

=== David Battrick ===
David has been a long-standing fixture in the Portland, Oregon music scene. He has been a past member of Monochrome, Written in Ashes, and Pharrah Phosphate. Notably, David spent 3 years studying percussion under the tutelage of Roger Allen (of the Portland Philharmonic fame).

=== Daniel Edgar ===
Daniel spent much of his early days growing up in a small Oregon town tinkering with drums, various noisemaking electronics, synthesizers and samplers. From an early age, he was inspired by European synthpop, 80s post-punk, and industrial music. Before Monody, Daniel spent time in several bands playing keyboards, bass, drums and most recently guitar.

== Discography ==
- Of Iron and Clay LP (April 2011)
- Of Iron and Clay: Voiceless (Instrumental) LP (April 2021)
- Subtle Dissent EP (November 2022)
- A Safe Place EP (December 2023)
- Abandoned Wisdom EP (February 2025)

=== Singles ===
- Bound (February 2008)
- Ceti Lullaby (February 2008)
- Absent (February 2008)
- In Between (February 2008)
- Thanks to You (September 2008)
- The Crime (September 2008)
- Disremembered (September 2008)

=== Remixes ===
- The Highest Cost (Monodized) by Son of Rust on re:Cycled (May 2009)
- Über's Wasser Gehen (Monody Remix) by Obscenity Trial on Über's Wasser Gehen single (Special Edition) (July 2009)
