= Segmental arterial mediolysis =

Rare disorder of the arteries

Segmental arterial mediolysis (SAM) is a rare disorder of the arteries characterized by the development of aneurysms, blood clots, narrowing of the arteries (stenoses), and blood collections (hematomas) in the affected distribution.

SAM most commonly affects the arteries supplying the intestines and abdominal organs.

== Signs and symptoms ==
Varies depending on the location of the affected blood vessels.

Gastrointestinal System:

- Acute abdominal pain (most common)
- Flank pain
- Nausea
- Vomiting
- Diarrhea
- Bloody stools
- Back pain

Nervous System

- Headache
- Stroke

The most severe signs occur if an aneurysm ruptures potentially resulting in:

- Shock
- Loss of consciousness
- Bleeding into the abdominal cavity
- Bleeding into the brain

== Mechanism ==
1. The middle layer of an artery, called the media, made of smooth muscle is damaged.
2. Mediolysis occurs when the smooth muscle cells in the area of damage are destroyed.
3. Small gaps are formed in the wall of the artery which then fill with blood.
4. Gaps create weakness in the wall of the artery, allowing increasing pressure from blood to expand the gaps resulting in an aneurysm.
5. Aneurysms have potential for rupture.

== Diagnosis ==
Often Segmental Arterial Mediolysis is diagnosed after clinical presentation with symptoms as above followed by CT angiogram or MRI demonstrating aneurysm(s). The gold standard method for confirming the diagnosis is surgical resection of the affected area of blood vessel followed by histologic investigation under a microscope. Segmental Arterial Mediolysis must be differentiated from fibromuscular dysplasia, atherosclerosis, and other systemic vasculidites including polyarteritis nodosa, Takayasu's arteritis, Behcet's disease, cystic medial necrosis, and cystic adventitial artery disease.

== Treatment ==
Patients presenting with bleeding into the abdominal cavity require possible blood transfusions and emergent intervention with coil embolization via catheter angiography. Patients without active bleeding, but diagnosed aneurysms should have strict blood pressure control with antihypertensive drugs to decrease the risk of aneurysm rupture.

== Epidemiology ==
Since it was first reported in 1976 there have been 101 documented cases of Segmental Arterial Mediolysis. Although typically seen in older patients with an average age of 57 years old, it can affect patients of any age and does not favor one gender or the other.
