= Daentl Townsend Siegel syndrome =

- Other names: Hydrocephalus-blue sclerae-nephropathy syndrome
- One of the symptoms, hydrocephalus, seen on a CT scan of the brain.

Daentl Townsend Siegel syndrome is a very rare disorder characterized by blue sclerae, kidney malfunction, thin skin, and hydrocephalus. It was first identified by D.L. Daentl et al. in 1978. Daentl Townsend Siegel syndrome is also known as "Hydrocephalus blue sclera nephropathy" and "Familial nephrosis, hydrocephalus, thin skin, blue sclerae syndrome".
