= Dieterich's disease =

Human disease

Dieterich's disease, also known as avascular necrosis of the metacarpal head, is an extremely rare condition characterized by temporary or permanent loss of blood supply to the metacarpal head of the metacarpal bone, resulting in loss of bone tissue. The five metacarpal bones are long bones located between the carpals of the wrist and phalanges of the fingers. Collectively, the metacarpals are referred to as the "metacarpus."

In the case of Dieterich's disease, some but not all metacarpal heads are affected. Onset of this disease can be attributed to steroid usage, systemic lupus erythematosus, or trauma. In some cases, it is randomly-occurring.

Dieterich's disease can be diagnosed through medical screening or blood testing. Physicians may also diagnose Dieterich's disease by taking a history of the patient's symptoms.

Some treatment options include medication, surgery, or therapy.

== Signs and symptoms ==
Early on, symptoms may not be noticeable. Patients may either be asymptomatic or may experience progressive joint collapse with increased pain and increasingly restricted range of motion.

== Cause ==
The cause of Dieterich's disease is still not fully understood. The disease can affect patients of any age, but typically affects patients in their 30s. Though rare, it can also occur in children. Statistics show that generally more men are affected by Dieterich's than women in an estimated ratio of 3:2. The third (middle finger) metacarpal head has been reported to be the most common site of necrosis. Though osteonecrosis is a fairly common condition, many cases of avascular necrosis of the metacarpal head go without being diagnosed. This is because presentation of symptoms is variable depending on the patient. Sometimes, the patient may even choose to ignore their symptoms.

Onset of Dieterich's disease can possibly be attributed to steroid usage, trauma, systemic lupus erythematosus, renal transplant, or scleroderma. It can also affect patients living with congenital short digits or atypical anatomical epiphyseal blood supply. In some cases, however, Dieterich's disease can occur spontaneously.

== Diagnosis ==
Scans showing bone tissue will typically display flattening or collapse of the metacarpal head, or deterioration of cartilage in the joint.

In some cases, a physician may take a patient history and make a diagnosis based on a combination of medical imaging and symptom history.

Dieterich's disease can be characterized by swelling, which can be indicated by C-reactive protein (CRP) and normal erythrocyte sedimentation rates (ESR), both of which can be shown in a blood investigation.

== Treatment ==
No single method of treatment has been determined as the optimal treatment yet, as each case is extremely variable.

== History ==
This condition was first described by German doctor H. Dieterich in 1932 in his journal entitled "Die subchondrale Herderkrankung am Metacarpale iii," translating to mean "The subchondral focal disease on metacarpal III," in English.

== Cases ==
=== Unnamed 54-year old female ===
An unnamed female was seen by Belgian doctors for a swollen, painful third metacarpophalangeal joint. According to the patient, these symptoms had persisted for 3 months with no previous recorded trauma. She had been taking large doses of cortisone to treat lung disease due to smoking. Though the patient could fully extend the joint, flexion was limited. Radiographs revealed deterioration of cartilage and collapse of the metacarpal head. The patient was unsuccessfully treated with anti-inflammatory drugs, then treated with removal of necrotic bone and bone grafting surgery with fair success.

=== Unnamed 37-year old male ===
A 37-year-old male was seen by Chinese hand-surgery specialists for chronic dull pain in his right hand. Physical examination showed swelling in his third and fourth metacarpophalangeal joints, and there was significantly limited range of motion on the third metacarpophalangeal joint. Patient had no history of trauma, but may have been affected by his work as a mechanical laborer. He had been seen one year previously and magnetic resonance imaging revealed flattening of the fourth metacarpal head. The patient returned because of continued pain. The third metacarpal head was then treated through bone grafting. In a follow up, it was noted that pain and swelling had diminished and there was a noted improvement in range of motion of the third metacarpophalangeal joint.

=== Unnamed 16-year old male ===
A 16-year-old male was seen for sudden pain in his right metacarpophalangeal joints. Though there was no history of trauma, the patient was a manual laborer. Range of motion was slightly limited and joint was mildly swollen and tender when palpated. Patient was originally treated with splinting and ibuprofen, but this further worsened his condition. Patient was then treated with physical therapy, but symptoms persisted. Finally, patient was treated with bone grafting surgery and splinted for three weeks. After surgery followed by physical therapy, full range of motion was restored within eight weeks.

=== Unnamed 36-year old male ===
A 36-year-old male electrician with no history of trauma presented with a painful right middle finger metacarpophalangeal joint. Range of motion was not limited. The affected joint did not have any particular outwardly visible indicators of Dieterich's disease besides some crackling noises with movement. Patient would stretch his finger for temporary relief. In this case, though blood work and plain-film imaging did not show any abnormalities, an MRI showed avascular necrosis in the middle finger. The patient was successfully treated with physical therapy.

=== Unnamed 68-year old woman ===
A 68-year-old woman was first seen with pain attributed to either inflammatory or septic arthritis. She had been receiving orthopedic treatment previously due to increasing pain. The affected metacarpal head of the ring finger showed limited range of movement and chronic swelling. Through laboratory testing and based on the evolution of the pain, it was determined to be Dieterich's disease. The patient was initially suggested surgical treatment, but she rejected surgery due to acceptable functional status of the joint.

== See also ==
- Aseptic necrosis
