= Craniofacial dysostosis-diaphyseal hyperplasia syndrome =

- Other names: Dysostosis Stanescu type, Stanescu osteosclerosis
- Specialty: Medical genetics

Craniofacial dysostosis-diaphyseal hyperplasia syndrome is a rare genetic disorder characterized by craniofacial dysostosis, small cranium with accompanying thin skullbone, generalized depressions on the frontoparietal and occipitoparietal sutures. It includes underdevelopment of the chin, exophthalmos, long bone cortical sclerosis (bending and shortening), and puberty-onset progressive bone cortex thickening. It is inherited following an autosomal dominant inheritance pattern. Around 14 cases from 3 families worldwide have been described in medical literature; however, the number may be higher as one of the families described with the disorder are said to have had other members with the same syndrome who were not physically examined by researchers.
