= Dermatoosteolysis, Kirghizian type =

- Other names: Kirghizian Dermatoosteolysis, Autosomal recessive syndrome of skin ulceration, arthroosteolysis with pseudoacromegaly, keratitis, and oligodontia
- Specialty: Medical genetics
- Symptoms: infant-onset recurrence of multiple symptoms that lowers in severity around the time of childhood
- Complications: Scoliosis, vision impairment, arthroses
- Usual onset: Infancy
- Duration: Symptoms lower in severity around childhood, although other complications last for life
- Prevention: none
- Deaths: -

Dermatoosteolysis, Kirghizian type is a rare presumably autosomal recessive genetic disorder characterized by the infancy-onset recurrence of the following symptoms: cutaneous ulcers, generalized arthralgia, fevers, peri-articular fistulous osteolysis, agenesis of all teeth, dystrophy nails, and keratitis. It usually decreases in severity around childhood but around that time complications have already developed, this includes skin scarring, arthroses, pseudo-acromegalic hands and feet, scoliosis, and vision loss. It has been described in 5 siblings born to healthy parents in Kyrgyzstan.
