= Bella Morte =

American gothic band

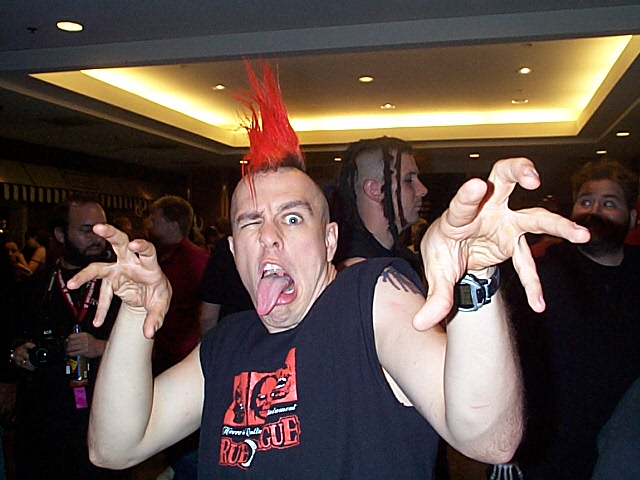
- Founding member and singer Andy Deane of Bella Morte at Dragon Con in 2006

Background information
- Origin: Charlottesville, Virginia, U.S.
- Genres: Gothic rock, dark wave, industrial, deathrock
- Years active: 1996–2023
- Label: Metropolis
- Past members: Andy Deane; Tony Lechmanski; Gopal Metro; Marshall Camden; Branden Shores

Bella Morte was a gothic rock band formed in 1996 in Charlottesville, Virginia, United States. They incorporate elements of metal, dark wave, deathrock, alternative, and synthpop. The band's name means "Beautiful Death" in Italian language. According to the band's vocalist, Andy Deane, the name was chosen to suggest that beauty can be found in tragedy, which is a re-occurring theme in Bella Morte's albums.

In 2002, they signed with Metropolis Records having previously self-released albums through their own label, Some Wear Leather, and, also, Cleopatra Records. In early fall 2006, Metropolis Records announced that Bella Morte had reached number one on the company's pre-order sales list with their new album, Bleed the Grey Sky Black, which was released on October 10, 2006.

The bass guitarist and co-founder Gopal Metro decided to leave the band, playing his last show on March 10, 2007, in Charlottesville. At the same show, the vocalist Andy Deane announced that Tony Pugh would replace Metro. At the beginning of summer 2008, it was announced that Jordan Marchini would not be touring with the band any longer. Nevertheless, he returned in 2011.

In July 2023, front-man and founding member Andy Deane announced that Bella Morte was retired. Their final live performance took place on March 31, 2023, at Dark Force Fest in New Jersey.

The decision to bring the project to a close was heavily influenced by the tragic passing of long-time guitarist Tony Lechmanski, whose loss marked a natural end to that era of the group.

Deane then formed the project The Rain Within.

== Former Band Members ==
- Andy Deane – vocals
- Gopal Metro – bass
- Tony Lechmanski – guitars
- Marshall Camden – bass
- Tony Pugh – bass
- Jordan Marchini – drums
- Branden Shores – drums
- Scotty Derrico – drums
- Clay Caricofe – drums
- Chris "Frizzle" – guitars
- Bn Whitlow – guitars
- Micah Consylman – keyboards (mainly the keytar during live performance)
- James Warnock – keyboards, lighting

== Discography ==
=== Full releases ===
- Remorse (cassette only, demo) (1996)
- Remains (1997)
- Where Shadows Lie (2000)
- The Death Rock EP (Vinyl – limited to 300) (2001)
- The Quiet (2002)
- The Death Rock EP (CD w/ bonus tracks) (2002)
- Remains (Remastered Version) (2002)
- As the Reasons Die (2004)
- Songs for the Dead (2004)
- Bleed The Grey Sky Black (2006)
- Beautiful Death (October 7, 2008)
- Before the Flood (June 14, 2011)
- Rare and Unreleased, volume 1 (February 14, 2012)
- The Best of Bella Morte 1996–2012 (June 25, 2013)
- Exorcisms (2014)
- Year of the Ghost (August 14, 2017)

=== Side projects ===
Andy Deane released a solo album as "The Rain Within", a reference to the Bella Morte's song "The Rain Within Her Hands", in 2010 titled Pain Management. "Brighter Fires" is another side project of Andy Deane and ex-bandmate Gopal Metro which released a self-titled album in 2012.

=== Compilations ===
- The Pink and The Black (1998) (Delinquent Records) – "One Winter's Night"
- The Unquiet Grave Vol 1 (1998) (Cleopatra Records) – "Funeral Night"
- Music from the Succubus Club (2000) (Dancing Ferret Discs) – "Fall No More"
- The Darkest Millennium (2000) (Cleopatra Records) – "The Rain Within Her Hands"
- A Gothic-Industrial Tribute to Smashing Pumpkins (2001) (Cleopatra Records) – "Soma"
- New Dark Noise (2002) (Cleopatra Records) – "Relics"
- Electronic Saviors Volume 2: Recurrence (2012) (Metropolis Records) – "Lost"
- Electronic Saviors Volume 3: Remission (2014) (Metropolis Records) – "The One Beside Me"

=== Music videos ===
- "In The Dirt" directed by Lloyd Kaufman was filmed on February 20, 2010, at Con Nooga in Chattanooga, Tennessee
- "Find Forever Gone" directed by Eric Thomas Craven. Released on September 30, 2008
- "On the Edge" directed by Eric Thomas Craven. Released on February 14, 2008
- "Earth Angel" directed by Eric Thomas Craven. Released on February 14, 2007
- "Another Way" directed by Wendy Shuey (2004)
- "Exorcisms" directed by Marshall Camden (2014)
- "Water Through Sand" directed by Brian Wimer (2015)
