= Fibromuscular dysplasia =

Human arterial disease

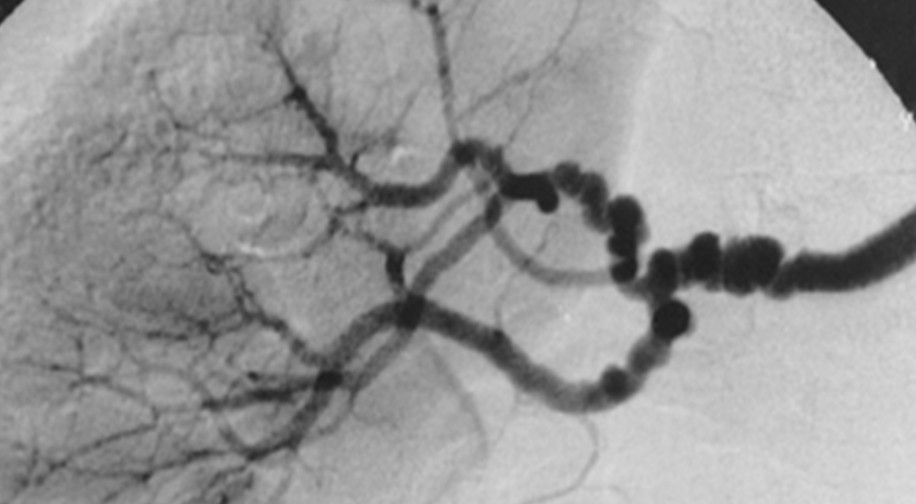
- The "string-of-beads" feature in multi-focal fibromuscular dysplasia. The sign is caused by areas of relative stenoses alternating with small aneurysms.
- Specialty: Cardiology

Fibromuscular dysplasia (FMD) is a non-atherosclerotic, non-inflammatory disease of the blood vessels that causes abnormal growth within the wall of an artery. FMD has been found in nearly every arterial bed in the body, although the most commonly affected are the renal and carotid arteries.

There are various types of FMD, with multifocal fibroplasia being the most common. Less common forms of the disease include focal (previously known as intimal) and adventitial fibroplasia. FMD predominantly affects middle-aged women, but it has been found in men and people of all ages. Pediatric cases of FMD are vastly different from those of the adult population and poorly studied. The prevalence of FMD is not known; although the disease was initially thought to be rare, some studies have suggested that it may be underdiagnosed.

== Signs and symptoms ==
Symptoms expressed by FMD patients are largely dependent on the vascular bed(s) affected by the disease. Patients may also be entirely asymptomatic and have FMD discovered incidentally (e.g., when imaging studies are performed for other reasons). In a study from the United States Registry for Fibromuscular Dysplasia, the median age at first symptom was roughly 47 years.

=== Renal arteries ===
The main symptoms associated with renal FMD are secondary hypertension and bruits that can be heard with a stethoscope over the abdomen or flanks. Complications such as aneurysms, dissections, or occlusion of the renal artery have been associated with renal artery FMD.

=== Cerebrovascular regions ===
The carotid and vertebral arteries are most commonly affected. Middle and distal regions of the internal carotid arteries are frequently involved. Patients with FMD in the carotid arteries typically present around 50 years of age. Symptoms of craniocervical involvement include headaches (mostly migraine), pulsatile tinnitus, dizziness, and neck pain, although patients are often asymptomatic. On physical examination, one may detect neurological symptoms secondary to a stroke or transient ischemic attack (TIA), a bruit over an affected artery, and diminished distal pulses. Complications of cerebrovascular FMD include TIA, ischemic stroke, Horner syndrome, or subarachnoid hemorrhage.

=== Other sites ===
Patients with mesenteric, or intestinal, FMD may experience weight loss or abdominal pain after eating. FMD within the extremities may cause claudication or may be detectable by bruits. If the lower limb arteries are affected, the patient may present with cold legs or evidence of distal embolic disease. FMD present in the subclavian artery may cause arm weakness, paresthesia, claudication, and subclavial steal syndrome.

=== Children ===
Children with FMD often report various non-specific symptoms or present with hypertension during routine physical examinations. Symptoms are commonly associated with the affected artery. Symptoms may include headaches, insomnia, fatigue, and chest or abdominal pain. FMD affecting the arteries of the head and neck is commonly recognized as a cause of childhood strokes. In children, renovascular disease accounts for approximately 10% of all causes of secondary hypertension.

Detection may stem from a bruit being present over the affected vascular bed during a physical assessment, though the absence of a bruit does not preclude significant vascular disease. Kidney failure is a common presentation in infants and children but is uncommon in adults, although it is occasionally the presenting problem in adults with focal disease. For infants and children under four years, the presentation of FMD is "especially likely to resemble vacuities".

=== Related diseases ===
The vascular subtype of Ehlers–Danlos Syndrome (type IV) has been associated with multifocal FMD. This syndrome may be suspected in patients with multiple aneurysms and/or tears (dissections) in arteries, in addition to the typical angiographic findings of FMD. There have been isolated reports of FMD associated with other disorders, including Alport syndrome, pheochromocytoma, Marfan syndrome, Moyamoya disease, and Takayasu's arteritis.

== Cause ==
While the cause of FMD remains unclear, current theory suggests that there may be a genetic predisposition as case reports have identified clusters of the disease and prevalence among twins. According to Cleveland Clinic, approximately 10% of cases appear to be inherited and FMD often coexists with other genetic abnormalities that affect the blood vessels. Approximately 10% of patients with FMD have an affected family member. A study conducted from the patient registry at Michigan Cardiovascular Outcomes Research and Reporting Program (MCORRP) at the University of Michigan Health System reported a high prevalence of a family history of stroke (53.5%), aneurysm (23.5%), and sudden death (19.8%). Though FMD is a non-atherosclerotic disease, family histories of hypertension and hyperlipidemia were also common among those diagnosed with FMD. It is believed that there is no single cause of FMD, but multiple underlying factors. There are theories of effects of hormonal influence, mechanical stress from trauma and stress to the artery walls, and loss of oxygen supply to the blood vessel wall caused by fibrous lesions. It has been suggested that environmental factors, such as smoking and estrogen, may play a role in addition to genetic factors, however concerns for safety associated with exogenous female hormones in FMD remain theoretical.

== Pathophysiology ==
FMD can be found in almost every artery in the human body, but most often affects the carotid, vertebral, renal arteries, and even those that supply the intestines, arms, and legs. Patients may present with FMD in multiple vessels. FMD has been pathologically categorized into three types of classifications: multi-focal, focal, and adventitial, each referring to the particular layer of arterial wall being affected.

=== Focal ===
Focal (previously known as intimal) fibroplasia is described as long, narrow, irregular, or smooth focal stenosis and can occur in any arterial bed. Whilst it is the most common type among children, it only accounts for approximately 10% of FMD cases overall. It most often presents with ischemic symptoms, and is frequently mistaken for Takayasu arteritis.

=== Multi-focal ===
Multi-focal (previously known as medial) fibroplasia involves thickening of the media and collagen formation. It is typically reported as having the appearance of a "string of beads" on angiographic review. "The 'bead' component is often larger than the normal arterial lumen, and in a subset of patients with FMD, aneurysms are present that may require treatment." The multifocal subtype of FMD accounts for nearly 80% to 90% of all FMD cases.

=== Adventitial ===
In adventitial fibroplasia, collagen replaces the fibrous adventitia and extends beyond the artery. This form is considered rare, but angiographic appearance may resemble the focal subtype of FMD, making the distinction difficult.

== Diagnosis ==
It is the lack of specific symptoms and their potential to appear anywhere that makes FMD a challenge to detect early on. The most accurate diagnosis comes from combining clinical presentation and angiographic imaging. According to the Michigan Cardiovascular Outcomes Research and Reporting Program (MCORRP, 2013), the length of time from a patient's first signs or symptoms to diagnosis is commonly 5 years.

FMD is currently diagnosed through the use of both invasive and non-invasive tests. Non-invasive testing includes duplex ultrasonography, magnetic resonance angiography (MRA), and computed tomography angiography (CTA). Invasive testing through angiography is considered the best way to detect FMD, though it is typically not done early in the diagnosis process due to the higher risk of complications. Occasionally, FMD is diagnosed asymptomatically after an unrelated x-ray presents the classic "string of beads" appearance of the arteries, or when a practitioner investigates an unexpected bruit found during an exam. As part of the diagnosis process, a practitioner may review medical and family history and perform a vascular examination.

A definitive diagnosis of FMD can only be made with imaging studies. Catheter-based angiography (with contrast) is the most accurate imaging technique; this test involves a catheter inserted into a large artery and advanced until it reaches the examined vessel. The catheter allows practitioners to view and measure the pressure of the artery, aiding in the categorization and severity of the FMD diseased artery. According to a study published in the Journal of Vascular Surgery, "catheter-based angiography is the only imaging modality that can accurately identify the changes of FMD, aneurysm formation, and dissection in the branch vessels." Practitioners believe it is important to utilize intravascular ultrasound (IVUS) imaging because stenosis can sometimes only be detected through the methods of pressure gradient or IVUS imaging. In addition, computed tomography angiography and magnetic resonance angiography are commonly used to evaluate arteries in the brain. Doppler ultrasound may be used in both the diagnosis and follow-up of FMD.

=== Similar diseases ===
In the visceral distribution, segmental arterial mediolysis may mimic FMD. In the visceral and cerebrovascular distribution, atherosclerosis must be considered.

=== Children ===
The differentiating presentations are suggestive of FMD being a unique syndrome with respect to the pediatric population. Experienced FMD clinicians warn against relying on the "string of beads" angiography for a diagnosis. It is suggested that FMD may be both under- and over-diagnosed in children with stroke.

== Treatment ==
There is no known cure for FMD. However, treatment focuses on relieving associated symptoms. Medical management is the most common form of treatment. The best approach to medically managing these patients is constantly being re-evaluated as more information is learned about the disease.

=== Kidney treatment ===
Blood pressure control is the primary concern when treating patients with renal FMD, as the ideal blood pressure target in patients with FMD is unknown. In cases of renal artery stenosis and indications for intervention, percutaneous balloon angioplasty may be recommended. Many studies have assessed the success rate of percutaneous transluminal angioplasty (PTA) in these cases and have found relief of hypertensive symptoms. Duplex ultrasonography should be performed soon after this procedure to ensure adequate renal velocities.

Stents have a restenosis rate of 10–20%, and may make surgical revascularization more difficult. Surgical revascularization may be necessary if aneurysms develop within the affected artery or if PTA does not resolve the issue.

Ex vivo renal artery reconstruction is sometimes used for complex diseases where branches of the renal artery are affected.

=== Cerebrovascular treatment ===
Patients with carotid or vertebral FMD are medically managed to reduce the risk of a stroke. Aspirin 81 mg is typically prescribed for patients with carotid FMD. Antiplatelets and anticoagulants may be used to reduce the risk of blood clot formation. If a TIA or stroke occurs, percutaneous angioplasty and antiplatelet therapy may be necessary. Pulsatile tinnitus manifests in 32% of US cerebrovascular FMD patients, and sound or cognitive behavioral therapy may be helpful for some patients with more severe symptoms.

=== Treatment for FMD in other regions ===
There is little information regarding the best treatment for FMD outside the renal and extracranial regions. If claudication or limb ischemia is consequent to FMD in the extremities, angioplasty may be implemented.

=== Children ===
In pediatric cases, treatment is determined by factors such as age and disease location. It routinely involves controlling hypertension, re-establishing vascular flow, preventing clots, and improving lifestyle through diet, exercise, and smoking cessation. Medical therapy for the pediatric population may involve the use of angiotensin-converting enzyme inhibitor (ACE inhibitors) and/or angiotensin II receptor blockers, multiple anti-hypertensive medications, diuretics, calcium channel blockers, and beta-blockers. Prevention of thrombosis in affected arteries may be achieved through the administration of an antiplatelet medication such as aspirin.

Percutaneous transluminal renal angioplasty (PTRA) is considered the best treatment for renal-artery FMD. It is useful when hypertension is difficult to control, such as when the patient is intolerant to the anti-hypertensive medications, non-compliant to the medication regimen, or experiencing loss of renal volume due to ischemia. PTRA can also aid in preventing a lifelong dependency on medication. According to an article published in Cath Lab Digest, "effective PTRAs result in cured or controlled blood pressure, which is often signified by reductions in plasma renin activity and angiotensin II levels, and when compared with surgery, percutaneous balloon angioplasty is less costly, able to be performed on an outpatient basis, results in lower morbidity, and the use of stenting is not primarily necessary." However, there is a subset of the pediatric population that is resistant to PTRA. Adverse events may include "recurrent stenosis, arterial occlusion with renal loss, and arterial rupture with extravasation and pseudoaneurysm formation."

== Prognosis ==
Research on FMD prognoses and outcomes is scant. In some cases, if not managed properly, FMD-related aneurysms can occur and cause bleeding into the brain, resulting in a stroke, permanent nerve damage, or death. Patients with multifocal fibroplasia generally have a favorable prognosis. Those who present with FMD in multiple vascular beds, or focal disease involving multiple branches of the renal arteries, may develop renal artery dissection or progressive renal impairment, therefore having a more difficult and complex prognostic course. There are no specific studies or reports on the long-term prognosis and outcome of FMD in children.

== Citations ==
- Baert AL, Wilms G, Amery A, Vermylen J, Suy R (1990). "Percutaneous transluminal renal angioplasty: initial results and long-term follow-up in 202 patients". Cardiovasc Intervent Radiol. 13 (1): 22–8. doi:10.1007/BF02576933. PMID 2140294.
- Tegtmeyer CJ, Selby JB, Hartwell GD, Ayers C, Tegtmeyer V (February 1991). "Results and complications of angioplasty in fibromuscular disease". Circulation. 83 (2 Suppl): I155–61. PMID 1825043.
- Mettinger KL, Ericson K (1982). "Fibromuscular dysplasia and the brain. I. Observations on angiographic, clinical and genetic characteristics". Stroke. 13 (1): 46–52. doi:10.1161/01.str.13.1.46. PMID 7064180.
- Schievink WI (March 2001). "Spontaneous dissection of the carotid and vertebral arteries". N Engl J Med. 344 (12): 898–906. doi:10.1056/NEJM200103223441206. PMID 11259724.
- Georges A, Bouatia-Naji N (August 2022). "The complex genetic basis of fibromuscular dysplasia, a systemic arteriopathy associated with multiple forms of cardiovascular disease". Clin Sci (Lond). 136 (16): 1241–1255. doi:10.1042/CS20210990. PMC 9434409. PMID 36043395.
- Persu A, Dobrowolski P, Gornik HL, Olin JW, Adlam D, Azizi M, Boutouyrie P, Bruno RM, Boulanger M, Demoulin JB, Ganesh SK, J Guzik T, Januszewicz M, Kovacic JC, Kruk M, de Leeuw P, Loeys BL, Pappaccogli M, Perik MH, Touzé E, Van der Niepen P, Van Twist DJ, Warchoł-Celińska E, Prejbisz A, Januszewicz A (January 2022). "Current progress in clinical, molecular, and genetic aspects of adult fibromuscular dysplasia". Cardiovasc Res. 118 (1): 65–83. doi:10.1093/cvr/cvab086. PMC 8752362. PMID 33739371.
- Di Monaco S, Georges A, Lengelé JP, Vikkula M, Persu A (May 2018). "Genomics of Fibromuscular Dysplasia". Int J Mol Sci. 19 (5): 1526. doi:10.3390/ijms19051526. PMC 5983654. PMID 29883369.
