= Distichiasis, congenital heart defects and mixed peripheral vascular anomalies =

Distichiasis, congenital heart defects and mixed vascular anomalies
- Specialty: Medical genetics
- Symptoms: Eyelash, congenital heart defects and various vascular abnormalities
- Usual onset: Neonatal
- Duration: Lifelong
- Causes: Genetic mutation
- Prevention: none
- Prognosis: Medium
- Frequency: very rare, only 5 cases have been described in medical literature
- Deaths: -

Distichiasis, congenital heart defects and mixed peripheral vascular anomalies is a very rare genetic disorder which is characterized by distichiasis, congenital heart defects, and various peripheral vascular abnormalities. Only 5 cases have been described in medical literature.

== Etymology ==
This disorder was first described in 1985, when Goldstein et al. described five patients; a mother and her four children, with a combination of distichiasis, congenital heart defects, and vascular abnormalities. The mother, who was 52 years old, had a ventricular septal defect, two of her daughters had patent ductus arteriosus, her oldest son had bradycardia of the sinus, and her youngest son had stress-induced asystole. Other findings found in some of her children were edema (3/5), chronic venous disease (3/5), varicose veins (2/5), and arterial leg disease (1/5).
