= DOOR syndrome =

- Other names: Deafness-onychodystrophy-osteodystrophy-intellectual disability-seizures syndrome
- This condition is inherited in an autosomal recessive manner
- Specialty: DiseasesDB = 32494

DOOR (deafness, onychodystrophy, osteodystrophy, and mental retardation) syndrome is a genetic disease which is inherited in an autosomal recessive fashion. DOOR syndrome is characterized by intellectual disability, sensorineural deafness, abnormal nails and phalanges of the hands and feet, and variable seizures. A similar deafness-onychodystrophy syndrome is transmitted as an autosomal dominant trait and has no mental retardation. Some authors have proposed that it may be the same as Eronen syndrome, but since both disorders are extremely rare it is hard to make a determination.

== Cause ==
The recurrence of DOOR in siblings and the finding of DOOR syndrome in a few families with consanguinity suggest that the condition is an autosomal recessive genetic condition. Mutations in TBC1D24 have been identified in 9 families.
