= Conductive deafness-ptosis-skeletal anomalies syndrome =

- Other names: Jackson Barr syndrome
- Deaths: -

Conductive deafness-ptosis-skeletal anomalies syndrome, also known as Jackson Barr syndrome, is a rare presumably autosomal recessive genetic disorder characterized by conductive hearing loss associated with external auditory canal-middle ear atresia which aggravates during ear infections, ptosis, and skeletal anomalies which consist of clinodactyly of the fifth fingers, radial head dislocation and internal rotation of the hips). Additional findings include thin nose, hair growth delays, and teeth dysplasia. It has been described in two American sisters.
