= Angel-shaped phalango-epiphyseal dysplasia =

- Other names: Hereditary peripheral dysostosis (or simply peripheral dysostosis)
- Specialty: Medical genetics
- Symptoms: Short middle phalanges which resemble the shape of decorative Christmas tree angels
- Usual onset: Pre-natal
- Duration: Lifelong
- Causes: Genetic mutation
- Differential diagnosis: Brachydactyly type C
- Prevention: none
- Prognosis: Good
- Frequency: Very rare, about 10-20 cases have been reported in medical literature
- Deaths: -

Angel-shaped phalango-epiphyseal dysplasia, also known as peripheral dysostosis, is a rare type of osteochondrodysplasia which is characterized by angel-shaped middle phalanges of the fingers and generalized metaphyseal dysplasia/delayed osseous age. Additional findings include joint hypermobility, hypodontia, and hip osteoarthritis. According to OMIM, 10 cases from multiple families have been described in medical literature. It is thought to be inherited in an autosomal dominant manner. According to ORPHA, 20 cases have been reported.

== Presentation ==
The middle phalanges' (often those of the 2nd, 3rd and 5th digits of the hands) angel shape is caused by an abnormal development of the epiphysis, metaphysis, and diaphysis of said phalanges; the wings are formed by an abnormal dyaphysis, the angel's skirt is from a cone-shaped epiphysis, and the head is formed by an abnormal distal pseudoepophysis.

== Genetics ==
This disorder is thought to be caused by autosomal dominant mutations in the GDF5 gene, in chromosome 20.

== History ==
This condition was first discovered in 1967, by Bachman et al. when he described a "hereditary peripheral dysostosis" on one woman and 2 of her children.

== Eponym ==
This disorder's name comes from the fact that Bachman et al. (the researchers who originally described the disorder) and Giedion et al. missed a characteristic feature that the people diagnosed with the disorder shared: a middle phalange that had a striking resemblance to the shape of decorative angels of small size that are often put in Christmas trees.
