= Deafness-vitiligo-achalasia syndrome =

Deafness-vitiligo-achalasia
- Specialty: Medical genetics
- Causes: Autosomal recessive inheritance
- Risk factors: Being born to consanguineous parents
- Prevention: none

Deafness-vitiligo-achalasia syndrome is an extremely rare genetic disorder characterized by congenital hearing loss, vitiligo, low height, muscle degeneration and achalasia. It was first discovered in 1971, when Rozycki et al., when they described two siblings of the opposite sex with the symptoms mentioned above. It is thought to be inherited in an autosomal recessive manner.
