= Cesium 137 (band) =

American electronic music duo

Cesium_137
- Origin: Philadelphia, US
- Genres: Futurepop; Synthpop
- Years active: 1998–present
- Labels: Metropolis; Tonedeaf
- Members: Vince Guzzardo; Isaac Walter Glendening
- Past members: Matt Cargill
- Website: http://www.cesium137.com

Cesium_137 is an American futurepop musical group composed of Isaac Glendening and Vince Guzzardo. It originally also included Matt Cargill.

== History ==
The group's first release was the album Advanced/Decay in 2001 on Tonedeaf Records. Its style was electro-industrial. It gained widespread attention, particularly with the moody dance track "Regrets", which was also released as a single and became a danceclub hit.

Soon after the September 11, 2001 attacks, Matt Cargill joined the U.S. military and was no longer available as a member of Cesium_137. Cesium_137 had a hiatus of three years before their next release.

That release was Elemental in 2004; it was issued with Metropolis Records, a much more prominent label than Tonedeaf. It was soon followed by an E.P. release, Luminous, also in 2004 on Metropolis; it composed largely of remixed material from Elemental. Cesium_137's style was much mellower and synthpop inspired and less angst-ridden on these releases than on Advanced/Decay. In 2006, Cesium_137 released their album Intelligent Design. Like its predecessor, it was released by Metropolis.

Cesium_137 is named after a radioactive isotope of caesium. It continues a tradition in industrial music of incorporating a number in the band name, which became popular after the example of Front 242. It also continues the narrower tradition in industrial music of adopting the name of an isotope as the band name, as with Carbon 12 and Front 242 offshoot Cobalt 60.

In 2008, Cesium_137 released a digital single ("Flight") and a full-length album (Proof of Life). The album put a conscious emphasis on themes of self-exile, terminal illness and perseverance.

Following those releases, Guzzardo began writing music for a trance music project called plasmaMan; of which Glendening was the producer. As a self-released collection of music the plasma Man EP, tinged with their usual dry humor, is titled Option B.

In 2009, the duo released the full-length album, Identity. They performed several high-profile shows to promote the album, including a performance at The Kinetic Festival in Canada.

== Discography ==
Studio albums

- Advanced/Decay (2001)
- Elemental (2004)
- Intelligent Design (2006)
- Proof of Life (2007)
- Identity (2009)
- Science and Sound (2012)
- Rise to Conquer (2018)

Singles and EPs

- The Art of Controlling and Composing (1999)
- The Fall (2001)
- Regrets (2001)
- Luminous (2004)
- Hollow (2006)
- Flight (2008)
