= Cheilectomy =

Surgical procedure

- Specialty: Podiatry

A cheilectomy is a surgical procedure that removes bone spurs from the base of the big toe.

Patients with a condition called hallux rigidus, or arthritis of the big toe, have pain and stiffness in the big toe. The word cheilectomy comes from the Greek word Cheilos, meaning "lip." A cheilectomy removes the bone spurs, or lip of bone, that forms as a result of arthritis of the joint. Removing the bone spurs, eases pain and lessens stiffness of the big toe.
