= Informatik =

- Also known as: Informätik
- Origin: Boston, MA, USA
- Genres: Industrial; EBM; futurepop
- Years active: 1993–present
- Labels: Metropolis; Sinless
- Spinoffs: Din fiv; Struktur
- Members: David Spiegelman; Tyler Newman
- Past members: Matthew Crofoot
- Website: www.nymphomatik.com

Informatik, formerly known as Informätik, is an electro-industrial/futurepop duo from Boston that was formed in 1993 and is represented by Metropolis Records in the US and Dependent Records in Europe. The band were repeat contributors to the "Mind/Body" compilation series organized by participants of the rec.music.industrial Usenet group in the mid-nineties. Both members are vegans.

== History ==
Informatik began as the duo of David Spiegelman (aka Da5id Din) and Matthew Crofoot. Crofoot had some piano training as a youth and had a technical background, but was ultimately inspired to make industrial music after exposure to bands like Front 242. Spiegelman played drums and percussion as a youth and came to write electronic music via MIDI programming. The duo self-produced their first demo tape, Direct Memory Access, and decided to start their own label, Sinless Records, so that they could retain control over the production and distribution of their music. The release included the track "Autonomous," which previously appeared on the rec.music.industrial Mind/Body Volume 2 compilation, and a cover of Led Zeppelin's "Immigrant Song."

The band used Sinless to distribute not only Informatik releases, but their other projects Din fiv and LogiQ, and produced a compilation of Boston area industrial music, Boston Elektro 101. They eventually opted to close the label after deciding the business was taking too much time away from their other pursuits. Around the same time the band secured a deal with Metropolis Records after sending demos to the label and Philadelphia area record store and distributor, Digital Underground. Metropolis offered not only to distribute Direct Memory Access but to sign the band to the label. Metropolis released their second album, Syntax, in 1998.

Crofoot left the band some time after Syntax and was replaced by Tyler Newman of Battery Cage prior to the release of Nymphomatik in 2002. The personnel switch corresponded with a stylistic change away from a more harsh EBM sound, towards a "trance-oriented" futurepop style. In 2004, the band released Re:Vision, a remix compilation of their prior material featuring interpretations by bands such as Assemblage 23 and Funker Vogt.

== Discography ==
- 1995 Direct Memory Access
- 1997 Direct Memory Access v2.0
- 1998 Syntax
- 2002 Nymphomatik
- 2004 Re:Vision
- 2008 Beyond
- 2009 Come Together (digital single)
- 2009 Arena
- 2013 How Long (digital single)
- 2013 Playing With Fire
- 2020 Impulse Ambient
