= DYM =

Protein-coding gene in the species Homo sapiens

Identifiers
- Aliases: DYM, DMC, SMC, dymeclin
- External IDs: OMIM: 607461; MGI: 1918480; GeneCards: DYM

Gene location (Human)
Chr.	Chromosome 18 (human)
Band	18q21.1	Start	49,041,474 bp
Band	18q21.1	End	49,461,347 bp

Gene location (Mouse)
Chr.	Chromosome 18 (mouse)
Band	18|18 E3	Start	75,151,852 bp
Band	18|18 E3	End	75,420,035 bp
RNA expression pattern
Bgee	Human / Mouse (ortholog); Top expressed in: bone marrow cell; ganglionic eminence; body of pancreas; muscle of thigh; tibialis anterior muscle; right testis; gastrocnemius muscle; left testis; Achilles tendon; gonad / Top expressed in: spermatocyte; spermatid; muscle of thigh; lumbar spinal ganglion; gastrocnemius muscle; ankle; quadriceps femoris muscle; tibialis anterior muscle; triceps brachii muscle; medial head of gastrocnemius muscle; More reference expression data
BioGPS	n/a
Gene ontology
Molecular function	enzyme binding; protein binding
Cellular component	membrane; cytoplasm; Golgi apparatus
Biological process	bone development; Golgi organization
Sources:Amigo / QuickGO
Orthologs
Databases	NCBI: entry; OMA: entry
Species	Human	Mouse
Entrez	54808	69190
Ensembl	ENSG00000141627	ENSMUSG00000035765
UniProt	Q7RTS9	Q8CHY3
RefSeq (mRNA)	NM_017653; NM_001353210; NM_001353211; NM_001353212; NM_001353213 NM_001353214; NM_001353215; NM_001353216	NM_027727
RefSeq (protein)	NP_060123; NP_001340139; NP_001340140; NP_001340141; NP_001340142 NP_001340143; NP_001340144; NP_001340145; NP_001361357; NP_001361358; NP_001361359; NP_001361360; NP_001361361; NP_001361362; NP_001361363; NP_001361364; NP_001361365; NP_001361366; NP_001361367; NP_001361368; NP_001361369; NP_001361370; NP_001361371; NP_001361372; NP_001361373	NP_082003
Location (UCSC)	Chr 18: 49.04 – 49.46 Mb	Chr 18: 75.15 – 75.42 Mb
PubMed search
- Wikidata
View/Edit Human	View/Edit Mouse

Dymeclin is a protein that in humans is encoded by the DYM gene.

This gene encodes a protein which is necessary for normal skeletal development and brain function and has been first described and named in 2003. Mutations in this gene are associated with two types of recessive osteochondrodysplasias, Dyggve-Melchior-Clausen (DMC) syndrome, which involves both skeletal defects and postnatal microcephaly with intellectual deficiency, and Smith-McCort (SMC) dysplasia, which involves skeletal defects only.
