= Southern =

Southern may refer to:

== Businesses ==
- China Southern Airlines, airline based in Guangzhou, China
- Southern Airways, defunct US airline
- Southern Air, air cargo transportation company based in Norwalk, Connecticut, US
- Southern Airways Express, Memphis-based passenger air transportation company, serving eight cities in the US
- Southern Company, US electricity corporation
- Southern Music (now Peermusic), US record label
- Southern Railway (disambiguation), various railways
- Southern Records, independent British record label
- Southern Studios, recording studio in London, England
- Southern Television, defunct UK television company
- Southern (Govia Thameslink Railway), brand used for some train services in Southern England

== Media ==
- 88.3 Southern FM, a non-commercial community radio station based in Melbourne, Australia
- Heart Sussex, a radio station in Sussex, England, previously known as "Southern FM"
- Southern Media Corporation, a television network in Guandong, China
- Nanfang Daily or Southern Daily, the official Communist Party newspaper based in Guangdong, China
- Southern Broadcasting Network, Philippine media company
- Southern Weekly, a newspaper in Guangzhou, China
- The Southern Illinoisan, known as The Southern, newspaper in Carbondale, Illinois, US
- Southern Command Network, a defunct American Armed Forces radio and television broadcaster in the Panama Canal Zone

== Music ==
- Southern (band), an indie rock duo from Belfast, Northern Ireland
- "Southern", a song by Orchestral Manoeuvres in the Dark on the album The Pacific Age

== People ==
- Southern (surname)

== Schools ==
- Southern University (formal name Southern University and A&M College), Baton Rouge, Louisiana
- Southern University at New Orleans, Louisiana
- Southern University at Shreveport, Louisiana
- Southern University College, a non-profit, private university college in Malaysia
- Southern High School (disambiguation), various schools

== Sports ==
- Southern 500, a NASCAR car race
- Southern 500 (1950-2004), a former NASCAR race
- Southern Conference, an American Division I college athletic conference
- Southern League (disambiguation), various sports leagues

== See also ==
- Culture of the Southern United States, also known as Southern culture, Southern heritage, or simply Southern, a regional subculture with a unique history and identity
- Sothern, persons with the surname
- Southern Comfort (disambiguation)
- Southern Party, a minor American political party that disbanded in 2003
- Southern Regional (disambiguation), various organizations
- South (disambiguation)
- Southerly (disambiguation)
- Southerner (disambiguation)
