= List of shipwrecks in November 1868 =

The list of shipwrecks in November 1868 includes ships sunk, foundered, grounded, or otherwise lost during November 1868.

== 1 November ==
List of shipwrecks: 1 November 1868
Ship	State	Description
Angelina	France	The ship ran aground and capsized at Great Yarmouth, Norfolk, United Kingdom. She was on a voyage from Alexandria, Egypt to Great Yarmouth.
Antina	Prussia	The ship was driven ashore on Wangerooge.
Chilton	United Kingdom	The barque was driven ashore and wrecked near "Sieul".
Havelock	United Kingdom	The schooner collided with the schooner Majestic (United Kingdom) and sank. She was on a voyage from Runcorn, Cheshire to Holyhead, Anglesey.
Ready Rhino	United Kingdom	The ship was driven ashore near Silloth, Cumberland. She was on a voyage from Dublin to Silloth.
Rienza	United Kingdom	The ship was abandoned in the Atlantic Ocean. Her crew were rescued by the brig Vesta (Norway). Rienza was on a voyage from Quebec City, Canada to Dublin and/or Liverpool.
Three Brothers	United Kingdom	The smack was run into by the brig Friends (United Kingdom) and sank at Great Yarmouth.

== 2 November ==
List of shipwrecks: 2 November 1868
Ship	State	Description
Bombay	United Kingdom	The ship departed from Greenock, Renfrewshire for Bombay, India. No further trace, presumed foundered with the loss of all hands.
Breeze	United Kingdom	The schooner collided with the steamship Iona (United Kingdom) and sank in the North Sea off the Farne Island, Northumberland with the loss of her captain. Survivors were rescued by Iona. Breeze was on a voyage from Dundee, Forfarshire to South Shields, County Durham.
HMS Galatea	Royal Navy	The Jason-class corvette ran aground in Plymouth Sound and was damaged.
Grand Bonny	United Kingdom	The ship was driven ashore at Waterloo, Lancashire. She was on a voyage from Liverpool, Lancashire to Bonny, Nigeria. She caught fire on 4 November, but the fire was extinguished before it reached kegs of gunpowder that formed part of her cargo.
Helena	United Kingdom	The brig foundered off Cape St. Vincent, Portugal. Her crew were rescued by the schooner Mountaineer (United Kingdom). Helena was on a voyage from Huelva, Spain to Gloucester.
Julia	United Kingdom	The ship foundered east of Lundy Island, Devon. Her crew were rescued by a pilot boat.
Margrethe	Hamburg	The schooner foundered in the North Sea. Her crew survived. She was on a voyage from Danzig to Hartlepool, County Durham.

== 3 November ==
List of shipwrecks: 3 November 1868
Ship	State	Description
Anchor	United Kingdom	The sloop sprang a leak and foundered in the North Sea off Spurn Point, Yorkshire. Her crew were rescued. She was on a voyage from King's Lynn, Norfolk to "Thorney Lees".
Exchange	United Kingdom	The ship sank in the English Channel off Cap Gris Nez, Pas-de-Calais, France. Her crew were rescued. She was on a voyage from Newcastle upon Tyne, Northumberland to Galway.
Florence	United Kingdom	The steamship ran aground at Cuxhaven. She was on a voyage from Leith, Lothian to Hamburg.
Gauntlet	United Kingdom	The barque was driven ashore and wrecked in the Chilia branch of the Danube.
Jane	United Kingdom	The brig foundered in the North Sea 150 nautical miles (280 km) east of Flamborough Head, Yorkshire. Her crew were rescued by the fishing boat No. 10 (Flag unknown). She was on a voyage from London to Newcastle upon Tyne, Northumberland.
Hoffnung	Prussia	The ship was driven ashore and wrecked on Amrum, Friesland, Netherlands.
Jabina	Prussia	The ship was wrecked on Sylt.
Jessie Sheckel	United Kingdom	The ship was wrecked in the Saint Lawrence River at Métis-sur-Mer, Quebec, Canada.
Maria	United Kingdom	The barque sprang a leak in the Kingroad and was beached on the coast of Somerset. She was on a voyage from Bristol, Gloucestershire to Demerara, British Guiana.
Novelty	United Kingdom	The schooner was abandoned in the Atlantic Ocean. Her crew were rescued by Allemania (Hamburg). Novelty was on a voyage from Labrador, Newfoundland Colony to Plymouth, Devon.
Voelas	United Kingdom	The ship struck the pier at Dover, Kent and was beached. She was on a voyage from London to Bristol, Gloucestershire.
Wilhelmina	Netherlands	The ship was wrecked on Sylt.

== 4 November ==
List of shipwrecks: 4 November 1868
Ship	State	Description
America, and United States	United States	The steamboats collided in the Ohio River 1 nautical mile (1.9 km) upstream of Warsaw, Kentucky. Both vessels caught fire and sank with the loss of nearly 70 lives.
Argos	United Kingdom	The steamship struck the pier and sank at Calais, France. She was on a voyage from London to Calais.
Edward	United Kingdom	The ship ran aground on the London Chest, in the Baltic Sea. She was on a voyage from Hull, Yorkshire to Saint Petersburg, Russia. She was on refloated and taken in to Saint Petersburg in a leaky condition.
Elizabeth	United Kingdom	The brig was driven ashore and wrecked on Norderney, Prussia. Her crew were rescued.
Hebe	United Kingdom	The ship was driven ashore and sank at Fleetwood, Lancashire. She was on a voyage from Liverpool, Lancashire to Singapore, Straits Settlements. She was refloated on 13 November and taken in to Fleetwood.
Saint Helier	United Kingdom	The brig was wrecked at Wyk auf Föhr, Prussia.
Unnamed	United Kingdom	The ship was driven ashore at Pellworm, Prussia with four of her seven crew dead.

== 5 November ==
List of shipwrecks: 5 November 1868
Ship	State	Description
Endeavour	United Kingdom	The ship was towed in to Great Yarmouth, Norfolk in a severely leaky condition. She was on a voyage from Whitby, Yorkshire to Whitstable, Kent.
Gesina Antina	Netherlands	The ship was lost near Lemvig, Norway. She was on a voyage from Stettin to Leith, Lothian, United Kingdom.
Giulietta	Italy	The ship arrived at Genoa from Leith, Lothian, United Kingdom on fire and was scuttled.
Helene	Prussia	The ship was driven ashore and wrecked at Memel. Her crew were rescued. She was on a voyage from Newcastle upon Tyne, Northumberland, United Kingdom to Memel.
Isabella	United Kingdom	The schooner was driven ashore near Egmond aan Zee, North Holland. Her crew were rescued. She was on a voyage from Zierikzee, North Holland to Newcastle upon Tyne.
Laurel	United Kingdom	The schooner was driven ashore at Rügenwalde, Prussia.
Libbiec	United Kingdom	The schooner was wrecked on Libby Island, Maine, United States.
Maria Louise	United Kingdom	The schooner was wrecked near "Karringoen", Sweden. She was on a voyage from Sunderland, County Durham to Stettin.
Marianople	Russia	The ship was wrecked on Andros, Greece with the loss of all hands, at least seven lives.
Wabeno, or Wahens	United Kingdom	The ship struck an iceberg in the Atlantic Ocean and was abandoned. All on board were rescued by City of Boston (United Kingdom).

== 6 November ==
List of shipwrecks: 6 November 1868
Ship	State	Description
Agnes Smith	United Kingdom	The ship was driven ashore and wrecked at Scrabster, Caithness.
Arnoldus Willem Naninga	Netherlands	The ship departed from Nyköping, Sweden for London, United Kingdom. No further trace, presumed foundered with the loss of all hands.
Eclipse	United Kingdom	The brigantine was driven ashore near Sydney, Nova Scotia, Canada. She was on a voyage from Digby, Nova Scotia to Glasgow, Renfrewshire. She was refloated and taken in to Halifax, Nova Scotia.
Friede	Sweden	The ship was wrecked at the mouth of the Eider. Her crew were rescued. She was on a voyage from Gothenburg to London.
Glenskenno	United Kingdom	The schooner was driven ashore and severely damaged at Sunderland, County Durham. She was on a voyage from Montrose, Forfarshire to Sunderland.
Lion	United Kingdom	The schooner was wrecked on the Cannon Rock, in the Belfast Lough. Her crew were rescued. She was on a voyage from Maryport, Cumberland to the River Quoile.
Premier	United Kingdom	The galiot was driven ashore and wrecked at South Shields, County Durham. Her five crew were rescued by rocket apparatus. She was on a voyage from Montrose to Sunderland.
St. Helens	United Kingdom	The barque ran aground on the Maplin Sand, in the North Sea off the coast of Essex. She was on a voyage from South Shields to Japan. She was refloated and taken in to Southwold, Suffolk in a leaky condition.
Swan	United Kingdom	The ship was abandoned in the North Sea. Her crew were rescued.

== 7 November ==
List of shipwrecks: 7 November 1868
Ship	State	Description
Jane	United Kingdom	The ship ran aground in the River Blackwater and was damaged. She was on a voyage from Maldon, Essex to Goole, Yorkshire.
Jessie	Norway	The ship collided with the steamship Severn (United Kingdom) and was abandoned. Her crew were rescued.
Merida	United Kingdom	The ship departed from Saint John's, Newfoundland Colony for Queenstown, County Cork. No further trace, presumed foundered with the loss of all hands.
Princess Alexandrina	United Kingdom	The ship ran aground in the River Blackwater and was damaged. She was on a voyage from Saint-Malo, Ille-et-Vilaine, France to Maldon.
St. Anne	United Kingdom	The brig ran aground on the West Hoyle Bank, in Liverpool Bay.
Valiant	United Kingdom	The ship foundered. Her crew were rescued.

== 8 November ==
List of shipwrecks: 8 November 1868
Ship	State	Description
Alceta	United States	The barque was wrecked at "Cape Bocca", Sicily, Italy with the loss of a crew member. She was on a voyage from Terranova di Sicilia, Sicily to New York.
Elizabeth Knowles	United Kingdom	The barque ran aground on Bar Three Keys, in the Black Sea.
Endeavour	United Kingdom	The ship was severely damaged in a gale at Naples, Italy.
Favourite	United Kingdom	The ship sank 1.5 nautical miles (2.8 km) west of St Ann's Head, Pembrokeshire. Her crew were rescued. She was on a voyage from Milford Haven, Pembrokeshire to Waterford.
Isabella	United Kingdom	The ship was severely damaged in a gale at Naples.
Jenny	Danzig	The ship was wrecked at Lemvig, Norway. She was on a voyage from Memel, Prussia to Liverpool, Lancashire, United Kingdom.
John Martin	United Kingdom	The ship foundered in the Mediterranean Sea off Alicante, Spain. Her crew were rescued by Dauntless (United Kingdom).
Margaret	United Kingdom	The schooner sprang a leak and was beached in Freshwater Bay, Pembrokeshire. She was on a voyage from Swansea, Glamorgan to Milford Haven.
Princess Alexandra	United Kingdom	The ship was severely damaged in a gale at Naples.

== 9 November ==
List of shipwrecks: 9 November 1868
Ship	State	Description
Albion	United Kingdom	The steamship was driven ashore at Gothenburg, Sweden. She was on a voyage from Gothenburg to Hull, Yorkshire. She was refloated and resumed her voyage.
Castle Lachlan	United Kingdom	The ship was destroyed by fire at Cape St. Vincent, Portugal. Her crew were rescued by Siren (United Kingdom). She was on a voyage from "Aquilas" to Newcastle upon Tyne, Northumberland.
Ceres	Prussia	The ship was driven ashore on Poel. Her crew were rescued. She was on a voyage from Tayport, Fife, United Kingdom to Wismar.
Clasmerden	United Kingdom	The ship sank Akyab, Burma with the loss of 23 of her 29 crew.
Fanny V	Austria-Hungary	The ship was wrecked.
Flying Fish	United Kingdom	The fishing vessel was run into by the brig Harmony (United Kingdom) off Smith's Knowl, in the North Sea off the cpast of Norfolk. Harmony took off ten of her twelve crew.
Josephine	United Kingdom	The brig ran aground on the Maplin Sand, in the North Sea off the coast of Essex.
Lusitania	United Kingdom	The brig was wrecked on the West Hoyle Bank, in Liverpool Bay. Her crew were rescued. She was on a voyage from Glasgow, Renfrewshire to Gibraltar. Lusitania was refloated on 13 November and taken in to Hoylake, Lancashire.
Martlet	United Kingdom	The steamship sprang a leak and was beached at Harwich, Essex. She was on a voyage from Hull to Dunkirk, Nord.

== 10 November ==
List of shipwrecks: 10 November 1868
Ship	State	Description
Camella	United Kingdom	The steamship collided with the barque Mazeppa (United Kingdom) and was severely damaged.
Glasmaden	United Kingdom	The full-rigged ship sank at Akyab, Burma with loss of live. There were sixteen survivors.
Italia	United Kingdom	The barque was driven ashore and wrecked near Callao, Peru. Her crew were rescued. She was on a voyage from the Chincha Islands to Callao.
Napier	United Kingdom	The ship ran aground in the Saint Lawrence River downstream of Batiscan, Quebec, Canada. She was on a voyage from Liverpool, Lancashire to Quebec City, and Montreal, Quebec.
Omar Pacha	United Kingdom	The ship ran aground. She was refloated and put in to Reval, Reval in a waterlogged condition.
Rochdale	United Kingdom	The brig sprang a leak and foundered off Happisburgh, Norfolk. Her seven crew were rescued by the Happisburgh Lifeboat Grocers ( Royal National Lifeboat Institution).
Surprise	United Kingdom	The brig was discovered in a derelict condition off Cape. St. Vincent, Portugal. She was on a voyage from Pomaron, Portugal to Gloucester. She was towed in to Cádiz, Spain, where she was condemned.
The Colleen Bawn	United Kingdom	The ship departed from Sydney, New South Wales for Hong Kong. No further trace, presumed foundered with the loss of all hands.
Tyne	United Kingdom	The ship was driven ashore at Gibraltar. She was refloated.
Unnamed	Flag unknown	The schooner collided with the steamship Gannet (United Kingdom) and foundered with the loss of all hands.

== 11 November ==
List of shipwrecks: 11 November 1868
Ship	State	Description
Alfred	United Kingdom	The brig ran aground off Maassluis, South Holland, Netherlands and was wrecked. Her crew were rescued. She was on a voyage from Schiedam, South Holland to London.
Frances Bourneuf	United Kingdom	The ship was driven ashore at Newport, Rhode Island. United States. She was on a voyage from Ardrossan, Ayrshire to Providence, Rhode Island.
HMS Gnat	Royal Navy	The Beacon-class gunvessel was wrecked on Balabac Island. All on board survived.
Isaac Webb	United Kingdom	The ship was driven ashore with the loss of the captain. She was on a voyage from Liverpool, Lancashire to New York, United States.
John Duncan	Canada	The ship was wrecked in the Atlantic Ocean with the loss of thirteen of the 22 people on board. The survivors were rescued on 23 November by the brig Dirego (United States). John Duncan was on a voyage from Saint John, New Brunswick to Liverpool, Lancashire, United Kingdom.
Providence	United Kingdom	The ship was run down by a steamship and sank in the Irish Sea 4 nautical miles (7.4 km) north east of the Middle Mouse Sand. Her crew survived. She was on a voyage from Liverpool, Lancashire to Amlwch, Anglesey.
Zetus	United Kingdom	The barque was wrecked on the Municar Reef, on the coast of Malta. Her crew were rescued. She was on a voyage from Sulina, Ottoman Empire to Cork or Falmouth, Cornwall.
Unnamed	Flag unknown	The schooner was wrecked on the Goodwin Sands, Kent, United Kingdom. Her crew were rescued by a brig.

== 12 November ==
List of shipwrecks: 12 November 1868
Ship	State	Description
Matanzas	United Kingdom	The steamship was destroyed in the Atlantic Ocean with loss of life. Six crew were rescued by Frank ( Canada). Matazas was on a voyage from Savanna, Georgia to New York.
River Hooghly	United Kingdom	The ship was sighted off Cape Horn, Chile whilst on a voyage from Swansea, Glamorgan to Valparaíso, Chile. No further trace, presumed foundered in the Pacific Ocean with the loss of all hands.

== 13 November ==
List of shipwrecks: 13 November 1868
Ship	State	Description
Busheer	United Kingdom	The steamship was driven ashore in a typhoon at Akyab, Burma. Her passengers were taken off . She was on a voyage from Rangoon, Burma to India.
Duke of Northumberland	United Kingdom	The barque was driven ashore in a typhoon at Akyab. She was later refloated.
Emma	United Kingdom	The brig was driven ashore at Huttoft, Lincolnshire. She was on a voyage from Memel, Prussia to Wisbech, Cambridgeshire. She was refloated the next day and found to be severely leaky.
Mainfleet	United Kingdom	The ship foundered in the Atlantic Ocean off the south coast of Ireland. Her seven crew were rescued. She was on a voyage from Queenstown, County Cork to a port in the Newfoundland Colony.
Naomi	United Kingdom	The full-rigged ship was driven ashore in a typhoon at Akyab. She was later refloated.
Providence	United Kingdom	The ship collided with a steamship and foundered. She was on a voyage from Liverpool, Lancashire to Amlwch, Anglesey.
Speedwell	United Kingdom	The ship was holed by her anchor and sank at Hunstanton, Norfolk. Her crew were rescued.
Two Brothers	United States	The ship was driven ashore on Bodie Island, North Carolina. She was on a voyage from Bath, Maine to New Orleans, Louisiana.
Volunteer	United Kingdom	The barque was driven ashore in a typhoon at Akyab. She was later refloated.
Yolo	Italy	The barque struck a rock and was severely damaged at Hawker's Cove, Cornwall, United Kingdom. She was taken in to Padstow, Cornwall in a leaky condition.
Unnamed	Flag unknown	The ship collided with Derwent and was presumed to have foundered.

== 14 November ==
List of shipwrecks: 14 November 1868
Ship	State	Description
Alice	Brazil	The schooner was wrecked in the Rio Grande do Norte. Her crew were rescued.
Castle Molan	United Kingdom	The ship was destroyed by fire at Lagos, Africa.
Esther	United Kingdom	The ship collided with Criteria (United Kingdom) and sank off the Eddystone Lighthouse, Cornwall. Her crew were rescued. She was on a voyage from Cardiff to Caen, Calvados, France.
Favourite	United Kingdom	The ship was driven ashore and wrecked at Kettleness, Yorkshire.
Fleetwing	United Kingdom	The ship was abandoned in the Atlantic Ocean. She was on a voyage from Quebec City, Canada to Liverpool, Lancashire.
Free	United Kingdom	The brig sank at Lagos.
Ganges	United Kingdom	The barque was wrecked on the coast of Brazil. She was on a voyage from Newport, Monmouthshire to Maranhão, Brazil. Her crew were rescued.
John and Grace	United Kingdom	The fishing smack was driven ashore at Fishguard, Pembrokeshire. She was on a voyage from Swansea, Glamorgan to Fishguard. She was refloated and taken in to Fishguard in a sinking condition.
Stamboul	United Kingdom	The ship was abandoned in the Atlantic Ocean. Her crew were rescued by Sarah Mendell (United Kingdom). Stamboul was on a voyage from Dalhousie, New Brunswick, Canada to Barrow in Furness, Lancashire.
Surprise	United Kingdom	The brig sank at Lagos.

== 15 November ==
List of shipwrecks: 15 November 1868
Ship	State	Description
Alert	United Kingdom	The ship struck rocks at Dover, Kent and was beached. She was on a voyage from Aberystwyth, Cardiganshire to Broadstairs, Kent. She was refloated and taken in to Dover.
Anne Powell	United Kingdom	The barque was wrecked at Lucena, Brazil. She was on a voyage from Paraíba, Brazil to Liverpool, Lancashire.
Annsborough	United Kingdom	The ship was driven ashore at Workington, Cumberland. She was on a voyage from Belfast, County Antrim to Workington. She had been refloated by 21 November and taken in to Workington.
Christiana	United Kingdom	The barque was abandoned in the Atlantic Ocean. Her crew were rescued by Glenalvon (United Kingdom).
Cigana	United Kingdom	The ship ran aground at Pernambuco, Brazil. She was on a voyage from Liverpool, Lancashire to Pernambuco. She was refloated.
Coromandel	United Kingdom	The ship was destroyed by fire near Batavia, Netherlands East Indies. Her crew were rescued. She was on a voyage from Galle, Ceylon to Hong Kong.
Gasper	United Kingdom	The ship departed from Kronstadt, Russia for London. No further trace, presumed foundered with the loss of all hands.
HMS Gnat	Royal Navy	The Beacon-class gunvessel was driven ashore on Balabac Island, Spanish East Indies. She was subsequently struck by lightning and exploded. Her crew were rescued by the paddle steamer Sud Vestè (Spain).
Janet and Jane	United Kingdom	The ship sank at Liverpool, Lancashire. She was on a voyage from Sligo to Liverpool.
Kaiyō Maru	Republic of Ezo	The steam frigate was wrecked off Esashi, Hokkaido, Japan, during a storm.
Pearl	United Kingdom	The ship collided with a brig and was abandoned with two of her crew reported missing. She came ashore at Garton, Yorkshire.
Richard Mount	United Kingdom	The brig ran aground at Lowestoft, Suffolk. She was on a voyage from South Shields, County Durham to Dordrecht, South Holland, Netherlands. She was refloated and taken in to Lowestoft in a leaky condition.
Sea Gull	United Kingdom	The ship was driven ashore and wrecked at Great Yarmouth, Norfolk. She was on a voyage from King's Lynn, Norfolk to Seaham, County Durham.
Skedam	United Kingdom	The brig ran aground in the Thames Estuary off Shoeburyness, Essex.

== 16 November ==
List of shipwrecks: 16 November 1868
Ship	State	Description
Amazone	Hamburg	The barque ran aground on a coral reef in the Spanish East Indies and sank. Her crew were rescued by Fair Leader (United Kingdom). Amazone was on a voyage from Cardiff, Glamorgan, United Kingdom to Hong Kong.
American	United Kingdom	The steamship ran aground in the Hooghly River. She was on a voyage from Calcutta, India to Hong Kong. She was later refloated and resumed her voyage.
Arcturus	United Kingdom	The brig was wrecked on Father Key's Reefs. Her crew were rescued. she was on a voyage from Saint John, New Brunswick, Canada to Cárdenas, Cuba.
Aunt	United Kingdom	The ship was driven ashore at Bude, Cornwall and was severely damaged. She was on a voyage from Bude to Plymouth, Devon She was refloated.
Calumet	United Kingdom	The ship was abandoned in the Atlantic Ocean. Her crew were rescued by Santa Rosa (Netherlands). Calumet was on a voyage from Liverpool, Lancashire to Calcutta.
Joseph. W. Webster	United States	The schooner was abandoned in the Atlantic Ocean. Her crew were rescued by Lucy and Paul ( Danzig). Joseph W. Webster was on a voyage from Philadelphia, Pennsylvania to Antwerp, Belgium.
Lapeyrouse	France	The ship sank at Dunkirk, Nord. She was on a voyage from Dunkirk to Guadeloupe.

== 17 November ==
List of shipwrecks: 17 November 1868
Ship	State	Description
Ion	United Kingdom	The ship departed from Quebec City, Canada for Hull, Yorkshire. Subsequently sighted in the Saint Lawrence River but never reached her destination. Presumed foundered with the loss of all hands.
Streamlet	(United Kingdom of Great Britain and Ireland) New Zealand	The schooner left Lyttelton Harbour for the South Island west coast, and was not seen again. She probably foundered during gales late in the month.

== 18 November ==
List of shipwrecks: 18 November 1868
Ship	State	Description
Edith	United Kingdom	The ship ran aground in the Bosphorus. She was refloated and resumed her voyage.
Hermon Hill	United Kingdom	The barque was abandoned in the Atlantic Ocean. Her crew were rescued by Carl (Flag unknown). Hermon Hill was on a voyage from Constanţa, Ottoman Empire to a British port.
Restless	United Kingdom	The brigantine was driven ashore at San Cataldo di Lecce, Italy. Her crew were rescued. She was on a voyage from Ancona, Papal States to Plymouth, Devon Restless was refloated on 25 November and taken in to Brindisi, Italy.
Wilhelmine	Stettin	The ship ran aground on the North Gar Sand, off the mouth of the River Tees, and sank. She was on a voyage from Middlesbrough, Yorkshire, United Kingdom to Stettin.
Unnamed	Prussia	The schooner was wrecked on Gotland, Sweden with the loss of all hands.

== 19 November ==
List of shipwrecks: 19 November 1868
Ship	State	Description
Allan-a-Dale	United Kingdom	The ship was abandoned in the Atlantic Ocean. Her crew were rescued by Mossrose (United Kingdom). Allan-a-Dale was on a voyage from Saint John, New Brunswick, Canada to Liverpool, Lancashire.
Artemis	United Kingdom	The brig was wrecked on the Cruiser Padre Reefs, off the coast of Cuba.
Catharina Cornelia	Netherlands	The barque was driven ashore and wrecked near Baltic Port, Russia. She was on a voyage from Saint Petersburgh, Russia to London, United Kingdom.
Dasher	United Kingdom	The smack was run into by the schooner Mary (United Kingdom) off Great Cumbrae, Argyllshire and was abandoned by her crew, who were rescued by the Mary. Dasher was on a voyage from Caernarfon to Glasgow, Renfrewshire.
Newcastle	United Kingdom	The brigantine was driven ashore and wrecked near Dungarvan, County Antrim. She was on a voyage from Gloucester to Waterford.

== 20 November ==
List of shipwrecks: 20 November 1868
Ship	State	Description
Hellespont	United States	The ship was wrecked at San Francisco, California. Seven of her eighteen crew were rescued, the rest were reported missing. She was on a voyage from Newcastle, New South Wales to San Francisco.
Spring Flower	United Kingdom	The ship was driven ashore at Great Yarmouth, Norfolk.
Topeka	United States	The barque was driven ashore at "Parkola". She was on a voyage from Kronstadt, Russia to Liverpool, Lancashire, United Kingdom. Ship was towed to Helsinki Grand Duchy of Finland, put to dry dock and sold in auction.

== 21 November ==
List of shipwrecks: 21 November 1868
Ship	State	Description
Cicerone	United Kingdom	The ship was driven ashore near "Hamuskair". Her crew survived. She was on a voyage from Kronstadt, Russia to London. She had sunk by 26 November.
Dorothea	Danzig	The barque was wrecked near "Steigen Nehrung" with the loss of seven of her ten crew. She was on a voyage from England to Riga, Russia.
Jeannie	(United Kingdom of Great Britain and Ireland) Guernsey	The ship ran aground on the Ridge Sand and was wrecked. Her crew survived. She was on a voyage from Guernsey to London.
Justine	France	The barque collided with USS Swatara (United States Navy) off Tarifa, Spain and was abandoned by her crew, who were rescued by USS Swatara. Justne was on a voyage from Gibraltar to Rio de Janeiro, Brazil. She was towed back to Gibraltar by the tugs Jackal and Lion Belge (both United Kingdom).
Lowestoft Merchant	United Kingdom	The smack ran aground on the Shiel Sand, in the North Sea off the coast of Norfolk. She was refloated on 23 November and taken in to King's Lynn, Norfolk.
Lucy	United Kingdom	The ship was driven ashore at Falmouth, Cornwall and broke her back. She was on a voyage from Southampton, Hampshire to Falmouth.
Mary	United Kingdom	The smack was driven ashore 1.25 nautical miles (2.32 km) south of Withernsea, Yorkshire. Her five crew were rescued by the Withernsea Lifeboat Pelican ( Royal National Lifeboat Institution).
Robert and Sarah	United Kingdom	The brig was driven ashore and wrecked at Cullercoats, Northumberland. Her eight crew were rescued by the Cullercoasts Lifeboat Lord Palmerston ( Royal National Lifeboat Institution).
Scotia	United Kingdom	The ship departed from Gibraltar for Harbour Grace, Newfoundland Colony. No further trace, presumed foundered with the loss of all hands.
Stephen and Elizabeth	United Kingdom	The brig ran aground at Lowestoft, Suffolk and was damaged. She was on a voyage from Sunderland, County Durham to Dordrecht, South Holland, Netherlands. She was refloated and taken in to Lowestoft in a severely leaky condition.
William Edwards	United Kingdom	The ship was driven ashore and wrecked on "Ruatad". She was on a voyage from ʻŌmaʻo, Hawaii to Liverpool, Lancashire.

== 22 November ==
List of shipwrecks: 22 November 1868
Ship	State	Description
Bertha	United Kingdom	The ship was driven ashore at Hals, Denmark. She was on a voyage from Riga, Russia to an Irish port. She was refloated on 25 November and taken in to Fredrikshavn, Denmark.
Coral	United Kingdom	The ship was sighted at Bic, Quebec, Canada whilst on a voyage from Quebec City to Liverpool, Lancashire. No further trace, presumed foundered with the loss of all hands.
Elizabeth and Jane	United Kingdom	The collier, a brig, was driven ashore and wrecked at Southsea Castle, Hampshire. Her six crew were rescued by the Coastguard.
Expert	United Kingdom	The ship was damaged by fire at South Shields, County Durham.
Florence Nightingale	United Kingdom	The ship was abandoned in the Atlantic Ocean. Her crew were rescued by Svalen (Norway). Florence Nightingale wa on a voyage from Swansea, Glamorgan to Valparaíso, Chile.
Henrietta	United Kingdom	The ship ran aground on the Ruger Sand. She was on a voyage from Middlesbrough, Yorkshire to Boulogne, Pas-de-Calais, France. Henrietta was refloated but then ran aground on the Sunk Sand. She was refloated on 25 November with assistance from the pilot cutter No. 13 (United Kingdom) and taken in to King's Lynn, Norfolk.
Louisa Downs	United States	After her masts were cut away to save her from sinking during a gale, the 11-ton schooner drifted into Dry Bay (59°08′N 138°25′W) on the south-central coast of the Department of Alaska and was wrecked on the shore. Her crew of three survived.
Margaret and Jane	United Kingdom	The barque was abandoned in the Atlantic Ocean. She was discovered on 24 November by the barque Ezra ( Newfoundland Colony), which put a skeleton crew on board. They took her in to the Isles of Scilly the next day.
Marie	United Kingdom	The ship was driven ashore and wrecked near Kristiansand, Norway. She was on a voyage from Pärnu, Russia to Dundee, Forfarshire.
Mary	United Kingdom	The ship was driven ashore south of Withernsea, Yorkshire. Her crew were rescued by the Withernsea Lifeboat.
Nordstjeren	Norway	The ship exploded and sank in the Atlantic Ocean 35 nautical miles (65 km) west of the Isles of Scilly, United Kingdom with the loss of one of her twelve crew. Survivors were rescued by Crossfell (United Kingdom. Nordstjeren was on a voyage from Cardiff, Glamorgan, United Kingdom to Havana, Cuba.
Triumph	(United Kingdom of Great Britain and Ireland) Guernsey	The barque struck a sunken rock at The Needles, Isle of Wight and was holed. She was consequently beached at Cowes, Isle of Wight. She was on a voyage from Guernsey to London.
Zampa	United Kingdom	The brig ran aground on the Maplin Sand, in the North Sea off the coast of Essex and was damaged.
Unnamed	Flag unknown	The schooner was wrecked on the Shipwash Sand, in the North Sea off the coast of Suffolk, United Kingdom.
Unnamed	United Kingdom	The schooner was wrecked on the Brinchetail Rocks, off Alderney, Channel Islands.

== 23 November ==
List of shipwrecks: 23 November 1868
Ship	State	Description
Constance	United Kingdom	The ship capsized and sank in the Sea of Azov. Her crew were rescued. She was on a voyage from Marianople, Russia to a British port.
Habil	Denmark	The brig was wrecked near Cádiz, Spain. She was on a voyage from Vadsø, Norway to Messina, Sicily, Italy.
Johann	Denmark	The schooner was driven ashore and wrecked near "Minklick", Russia. Her crew were rescued. She was on a voyage from Vyborg, Finland to Hartlepool, County Durham, United Kingdom.
Marie	United Kingdom	The ship was driven ashore near Kristiansand, Norway. She was on a voyage from Pärnu, Russia to Dundee, Forfarshire.
Mary and Elizabeth	United Kingdom	The barque was wrecked at Cape Spartel, Morocco with the loss of six of her crew. She was on a voyage from Cardiff, Glamorgan to Alexandria, Egypt.
Mary Jane	United Kingdom	The schooner was driven ashore and wrecked near Youghal, County Cork. Her crew were rescued by the Youghal Lifeboat William Beckett of Leeds ( Royal National Lifeboat Institution). She was on a voyage from Padstow, Cornwall to Cork.
Rob Roy	United Kingdom	The ship was driven ashore on Miscou Island, New Brunswick, Canada. She was on a voyage from Dalhousie, New Brunswick to Liverpool, Lancashire. She had been refloated by 18 February 1869 and taken in to "Little Shippingham", New Brunswick.
Thessalia	United Kingdom	The ship ran aground on The Shingles, in the English Channel off the Isle of Wight. She was on a voyage from Sulina, Ottoman Empire to Great Yarmouth, Norfolk.
Wave Spirit	United Kingdom	The ship caught fire in the North Sea 7 nautical miles (13 km) off Seaham, County Durham and was abandoned by her crew. She was on a voyage from London to South Shields, County Durham. Wave Spirit came ashore in Allison's Bay and was wrecked.

== 24 November ==
List of shipwrecks: 24 November 1868
Ship	State	Description
Eleanor	United Kingdom	The steamship ran aground at Blackwall, Middlesex. She was on a voyage from Hartlepool, County Durham to London. She was refloated.
Enterprise	United Kingdom	The ship ran aground on the Kentish Knock. She was on a voyage from Caen, Calvados, France to Great Yarmouth, Norfolk. She was refloated and completed her voyage in a leaky condition.
Hibernia	United Kingdom	The steamship was holed by her propeller in the Atlantic Ocean. She was abandoned the next day. All on board took to the lifeboats. Star of Hope (United Kingdom) rescued 52 people in three of the lifeboats and Ocean Spray (United Kingdom) rescued 39 people; Cuthbert (United Kingdom) rescued 21 people. Seventeen people were lost. Hibernia was on a voyage from New York to the Clyde.
Light of the Age	United Kingdom	The ship was driven ashore in the River Thames at Limehouse, Middlesex. She was on a voyage from Colombo, Ceylon to London. She was refloated and taken in to London.
Swift	United Kingdom	The ship departed from Harbour Grace, Newfoundland Colony for New York. No further trace, presumed foundered with the loss of all hands.
Unnamed	United Kingdom	The hopper barge ran aground on the Herd Sand, in the North Sea off the coast of County Durham. Her crew were rescued by the South Shields Lifeboat.

== 25 November ==
List of shipwrecks: 25 November 1868
Ship	State	Description
Argus	United Kingdom	The brig was driven ashore and wrecked at Breaksea Point, Glamorgan.
Constance	United Kingdom	The ship capsized at Kertch, Russia. Her crew were rescued.
I'll Try	United Kingdom	The ship was driven ashore at Wexford.
Inanda	United Kingdom	The barque ran aground on the Long Bank, in the Irish Sea off the coast of County Wexford and capsized. Her crew were rescued. She was on a voyage from Africa to Liverpool, Lancashire. Inanda was towed in to Wexford the next day by the steamship Ruby (United Kingdom).
Jenny	(United Kingdom of Great Britain and Ireland) Guernsey	The ship was wrecked on the Ridge Sand, in the English Channel off the Kent coast.
Rambler	United Kingdom	The ship was driven ashore at Wexford.

== 26 November ==
List of shipwrecks: 26 November 1868
Ship	State	Description
Hotspur	United Kingdom	The steamship was driven ashore east of Cape Ivi, Algeria. She was on a voyage from South Shields, County Durham to Alexandria, Egypt. She hab been refloated by 16 December and taken in to Algiers.
John and Mary	United Kingdom	The schooner sank at the Mumbles, Glamorgan. She was on a voyage from Brixham, Devon to Porthcawl, Glamorgan. She was refloated the next day and towed in to Swansea, Glamorgan.
Sarah	United Kingdom	The ship foundered in the North Sea 5 nautical miles (9.3 km) off the mouth of the Humber. Her crew survived. She was on a voyage from London to Hartlepool, County Durham.
Stockton Packet	United Kingdom	The schooner sprang a leak and foundered in the North Sea 5 nautical miles (9.3 km) east of Saltburn-by-the-Sea, Yorkshire. Her crew were rescued by the smack Sarah Jane (United Kingdom). Stockton Packet was on a voyage from London to Hartlepool.
Storm Bird	(United Kingdom of Great Britain and Ireland) Jersey	The schooner was abandoned in the Atlantic Ocean. Her crew were rescued by the barque Choice (United Kingdom). Storm Bird was on a voyage from the Clyde to Rio de Janeiro, Brazil.
Swift	United Kingdom	The ship was wrecked at Helsingør, Denmark. She was on a voyage from Riga, Russia to Sheerness, Kent.

== 27 November ==
List of shipwrecks: 27 November 1868
Ship	State	Description
Claudine	United Kingdom	The ship was wrecked near Marstrand, Sweden. She was on a voyage from Hull, Yorkshire to Aarhus, Denmark.
Hamburg	Hamburg	The ship was wrecked at St. Julian's. She was on a voyage from Cádiz to Santander, Spain.
Innisfallen	United Kingdom	The ship departed from Liverpool, Lancashire for Bombay, India. No further trace, presumed foundered with the loss of all hands.
Jacobus	United Kingdom	The ship was wrecked. She was on a voyage from Newcastle upon Tyne, Northumberland to Gothenburg, Sweden.
John Dwyer	Canada	The barque collided with HMS Crocodile (Royal Navy) and sank in the English Channel 40 nautical miles (74 km) south by west of Start Point, Devon (49°39′N 3°24′W) with the loss of four of her twelve crew. Survivors were rescued by HMS Crocodile. John Dwyer was on a voyage from Callao, Peru to Antwerp, Belgium.
Oregon	United Kingdom	The ship was sighted in the Saint Lawrence River at Bic, Quebec, Canada whilst on a voyage from Quebec City to Swansea, Glamorgan. No further trace, presumed foundered with the loss of all hands.
Shark	United Kingdom	The steamship was abandoned in the North Sea. Her crew were rescued. She was towed in to Grimsby, Lincolnshire in a derelict condition.

== 28 November ==
List of shipwrecks: 28 November 1868
Ship	State	Description
Laertes	United Kingdom	The ship departed from New York, United States for Queenstown, County Cork. No further trace, presumed foundered with the loss of all hands.
Rover	United Kingdom	The schooner was driven ashore at Arbroath, Forfarshire. Her crew were rescued. She was on a voyage from Sunderland, County Durham to Arbroath. Rover became a wreck the next day.
Saxon	United Kingdom	The steamship ran aground off Swinemünde, Prussia. She was on a voyage from Stettin to London. She was refloated the next day and taken in to Swinemünde.
Stephen Duncan	United Kingdom	The ship was driven ashore at Cape Spartel, Morocco. She was on a voyage from New York to Marseille, Bouches-du-Rhône, France.
Toscana	United Kingdom	The ship departed from New York for Glasgow, Renfrewshire. No further trace, presumed foundered with the loss of all hands.

== 29 November ==
List of shipwrecks: 29 November 1868
Ship	State	Description
Atrevida	(United Kingdom of Great Britain and Ireland) Jersey	The ship was wrecked in the Magdalen Islands, Nova Scotia, Canada. Her crew were rescued. She was on a voyage from Gaspé, Quebec, Canada to Rio de Janeiro, Brazil.
Glance	United Kingdom	The ship departed from Teignmouth, Devon for Saint John's, Newfoundland Colony. No further trace, presumed foundered with the loss of all hands.
Gloria	United Kingdom	The ship was abandoned in the Atlantic Ocean. Her crew, except for three who refused to leave, were rescued by Turgot (France). Gloria was on a voyage from Sunderland, County Durham to A Coruña, Spain.
Northerner	United States	The wreck of Northerner on 6 May 2010. While under tow from Port Washington to Milwaukee, Wisconsin, by the steamer Cuyahoga (United States) with a cargo of cordwood, the leaking 81.13-foot (24.73 m), 77.33-gross register ton two-masted schooner capsized and sank in without loss of life in Lake Michigan off Ulao, Wisconsin, 5 nautical miles (9.3 km; 5.8 mi) southeast of Port Washington. Cuyahoga rescued her crew. Her wreck lies in the Wisconsin Shipwreck Coast National Marine Sanctuary at 43°19.00′N 087°48.64′W in 140 feet (43 m) of water with her mainmast rising 75 feet (23 m) above her deck.
Viceroy	United Kingdom	The ship was destroyed by fire at sea. Her crew were rescued. She was on a voyage from Liverpool, Lancashire to San Francisco, California, United States.

== 30 November ==
List of shipwrecks: 30 November 1868
Ship	State	Description
Annie Scott	United Kingdom	The ship ran aground on the Cross Sand, in the North Sea off the coast of Norfolk. Her nine crew were rescued by the Caister Lifeboat. She was on a voyage from Memel, Prussia to London. She floated off and was beached at Great Yarmouth, Norfolk.
Betsey	United Kingdom	The ship was driven ashore near Ballymacaw, County Waterford with the loss of three of her four crew.
Maria	Prussia	The derelict ship was driven ashore at Roberts Cove, County Cork with the loss of at least two lives and possibly all hands. She was on a voyage from the Rio Grande to Liverpool, Lancashire, United Kingdom.
Mea	Austria-Hungary	The barque was wrecked in Tramore Bay. Her seventeen crew were rescued by the Wexford Lifeboat Tom Egan ( Royal National Lifeboat Institution). She was on a voyage from Sulina, Ottoman Empire to Waterford.
Omega	United Kingdom	The ship departed from Fernandina, Florida, United States for Havana, Cuba. No further trace, presumed foundered with the loss of all hands.
Ripple	United Kingdom	The ship was lost off Cork with the loss of all hands.
Thornley	United Kingdom	The brig ran aground on the Goldstone Rock, in the Farne Islands, Northumberland and was severely damaged. She was on a voyage from "Kylorn" to Sunderland, County Durham. She was refloated and beached at Lindisfarne, Northumberland.
Village Maid	United Kingdom	The ship was driven ashore in Wigtown Bay. She was on a voyage from Port Dinorwic, Caernarfonshire to Newry, County Antrim. She was refloated and taken in to Garlieston, Wigtownshire.
William Henry	United Kingdom	The schooner was wrecked on St Mary's Isle, Kirkcudbrightshire. Her crew were rescued by the Kirkcudbright Lifeboat Helen Lees ( Royal National Lifeboat Institution). She was on a voyage from Belfast, County Antrim to Maryport, Cumberland.

== Unknown date ==
List of shipwrecks: Unknown date in November 1868
Ship	State	Description
Adelheid	Flag unknown	The ship ran aground at the mouth of the Rio Grande before 14 November.
Alina	United Kingdom	The brig caught fire and sank at Lobos, Argentina before 24 November.
Antrim	United Kingdom	The full-rigged ship was driven ashore in Manila Bay. She was on a voyage from Mauritius to Manila, Spanish East Indies. She was refloated.
Armetia	United Kingdom	The barque was lost near Swatow, China.
Auguste	United Kingdom	The ship was wrecked. She was on a voyage from London to Calais, France.
Bride of the Seas	United Kingdom	The ship was wrecked at Bonny, Africa.
B. Smith	United States	The ship was wrecked at Dollar Harbour, Bahamas. She was on a voyage from Morant Bay, Jamaica to New York.
Calabar	United Kingdom	The ship was driven ashore at Calcutta, India before 16 November. She was on a voyage from Rangoon, Burma to Calcutta.
Catterino D.	Greece	The ship was wrecked at Sulina, Ottoman Empire before 14 November.
Champion	United Kingdom	The brig was wrecked on Arenas Island, near Veracruz, Mexico before 17 November.
Chilian Packet	United Kingdom	The ship ran aground at Buenos Aires, Argentina. She was on a voyage from Cardiff, Glamorgan to Buenos Aires. She had been refloated by 26 November but collided with the barque Barbadoes ( Canada) and was further damaged.
Chiloe	Chile	The ship foundered. She was on a voyage from Ancun to Valparaíso.
City of Berlin	United Kingdom	The ship was driven ashore at Calcutta before 16 November. She was on a voyage from Bombay to Calcutta.
City of Edinburgh	United Kingdom	The ship was driven ashore at Calcutta before 16 November. She was on a voyage from Mauritius to Calcutta.
Eliza	Canada	The ship was abandoned in the Atlantic Ocean. She was on a voyage from Saint John, New Brunswick to Montevideo, Uruguay. She came ashore on Langlade Island.
Enniskellen	United Kingdom	The steamship was driven ashore at Vefsn Municipality, Norway. She was refloated five days later and resumed her voyage.
Eugene Josephine	United Kingdom	The ship was wrecked at Saint Domingo.
Exchange	United Kingdom	The ship sank at Cape Nunez.
Forest Belle	United States	The fishing schooner possibly sank in a gale on the Georges Bank in January, 1869, she sailed from Gloucester, Massachusetts in November, 1868 on her maiden voyage and vanished. Lost with all 12 hands.
Giuseppe Ferraro	Italy	The ship was driven ashore before 14 November. She was on a voyage from Montevideo to an English port. She was refloated and put back to Montevideo.
Harvest Maid	United Kingdom	The ship capsized in the Atlantic Ocean 30 nautical miles (56 km) south of Cape Finisterre, Spain and was abandoned by her crew, who were rescued by the steamship Napoli (Italy). Harvest Maid on a voyage from Trieste to Queenstown, County Cork. She was righted and towed in to Lisbon, Portugal by Napoli.
Hibernia	United Kingdom	The full-rigged ship foundered in the Atlantic Ocean. Thirty-nine passengers were rescued by the barque America (Bremen). Hibernia was on a voyage from Quebec City, Canada to Queenstown.
Howden	United Kingdom	The ship was driven ashore at Calcutta before 16 November. She was on a voyage from Bombay to Calcutta.
Isaac Webb	United Kingdom	The ship was driven ashore at Sandy Hook, New Jersey, United States before 23 November. She was on a voyage from Liverpool, Lancashire to New York. She was refloated and taken in to New York.
Johan	Netherlands	The galiot foundered in the English Channel off Portland, Dorset, United Kingdom. Her crew were rescued by Carl (Flag unknown). Johan was on a voyage from Vilanova to Ghent, East Flanders, Belgium.
Kate Chipman	United States	The barque was abandoned in the Atlantic Ocean before 15 November.
Lancaster	United Kingdom	The barque was abandoned in the Atlantic Ocean before 18 November with the loss of four of her sixteen crew. Survivors were rescued by the schooner Warrior ( (United Kingdom of Great Britain and Ireland) Jersey). Lanaster was on a voyage from Quebec City to Liverpool.
Margarita	United Kingdom	The ship was abandoned at sea. She was on a voyage from Penarth, Glamorgan to Manila, Spanish East Indies.
Minorca	United Kingdom	The ship was wrecked at Berdyansk, Russia.
Nangata	Japan	The steamship was wrecked. Her crew were rescued.
Ocean Belle	United Kingdom	The ship was destroyed by fire before 4 November. She was on a voyage from Quebec City to Cardiff.
Star of the Union	United States	The steamship was wrecked before 17 November. She was on a voyage from New Orleans, Louisiana to Philadelphia, Pennsylvania.
T. E. Lemon	United Kingdom	The ship was driven ashore at Calcutta before 16 November. She was on a voyage from Bombay to Calcutta.
Ward Chapman	United Kingdom	The ship was abandoned in the Atlantic Ocean before 4 November. She was on a voyage from Quebec City to Limerick.
Zeus	United Kingdom	The ship was wrecked at Valetta, Malta before 13 November.
