= South (disambiguation) =

South is a cardinal direction or compass point.

South or The South may also refer to:

== Geography ==
- Global South, the developing nations of the world
- South (lunar crater)
- South (Martian crater)
- Southern England ("The South")
- Southern United States ("The South")
  - Confederate States of America ("The South") during the American Civil War
- South India
- South River (disambiguation)
- South (European Parliament constituency), in Republic of Ireland
- South (Cardiff electoral ward), a former ward in Wales
- South (Newham ward), a former electoral ward of Newham London Borough Council from 1964 to 2002
- South, Luton, a ward in Luton, Bedfordshire, England

== Arts, entertainment, media ==
=== Literature ===
- The South (Tóibín novel), by Colm Tóibín
- The South (Tash Aw novel), 2025 novel by Tash Aw
- "The South" (short story), by Jorge Luis Borges
- South (magazine), a bi-monthly magazine published in Savannah, Georgia
- south, interdisciplinary journal formerly known as Southern Literary Journal
- South (book) by Ernest Shackleton

=== Film and television titles ===
- The South (film), or El Sur, by Victor Erice
- South (film), a 1919 documentary
- South (1999 film), a documentary film
- South (Play of the Week) (1959), by Gerald Savory (UK), known as the "earliest known gay TV drama"
- South (miniseries), a 1988 two-episode spin-off from British soap opera Brookside, starring Justine Kerrigan and Sean McKee
- South Circuit, a former Hindi film distribution circuit covering South India

=== Music ===
==== Music groups ====
- South (band), a rock band from London, England, active 1998–2009
- The South, a band formed in 2008 by former members of The Beautiful South
- South, duo composed of songwriter Fred Burch and pianist Don Hill, 1969
- South, project of Lonnie Mack and Ed Labunski, 1978

==== Albums ====
- South (Heather Nova album), 2001
- South (Shona Laing album), 1987/1988
- South (EP), an album by Ego Likeness
- South (EP), an album by Hippo Campus

==== Songs ====
- South (composition), a jazz composition written by and made popular by Bennie Moten's Kansas City Orchestra
- "South", a song by Ego Likeness off the eponymous EP South
- "South", a song by Shona Laing off the eponymous album South
- "The South" (song), a 2013 single by The Cadillac Three

== Other uses ==
- South (surname), list of people with the surname South
- South Melbourne FC, a soccer club
- South of Scotland rugby union team
- The South (Freemasonry), the social phase of a meeting

== See also ==
- Southern (disambiguation)
- Souths (disambiguation)
