= Southerner =

Southerner can refer to:

== People ==
- A person from the southern part of a state or country; for example:
  - Lhotshampas, also called Southerners, ethnically Nepalese residents of southern Bhutan
  - Someone from South India
  - Someone from Southern England
  - Someone from the Southern United States
  - Someone from Southern Serbia
- Epes the Southerner, 3rd century Jewish scholar

== Arts and entertainment ==
- The Southerner (1913), a novel about Abraham Lincoln by Thomas Dixon Jr.
- The Southerner (film), by Jean Renoir
- Carter-Lewis and the Southerners, an early-1960s English rock band
- "Southerners", a song by Prefuse 73 from the 2003 album One Word Extinguisher

== Transportation ==
- USS Southerner (1861), a schooner used as a sunken obstruction in the American Civil War
- Southerner (marine vessel), an outside broadcast unit
- Southerner (New Zealand train), a former New Zealand express passenger train
- Southerner (U.S. train), a United States passenger train operated by the Southern Railway between New York and New Orleans
- Southerner, a United States passenger train operated by the Missouri Pacific railway, between St. Louis and different Texas termini (Laredo and Galveston)

== Other uses ==
- Southerners (Korean political faction) of the Joseon period in Korea, resulting from a split in 1590 of the Easterners (Korean political faction)
- Southerners Sports Club (Bangkok), an informal, non-commercial Bangkok-based club of expats and Thais
- The Southerner (high school newspaper), from Atlanta, Georgia

== See also ==
- Black Southerners, African-American people from the Southern United States who identify as such
- White Southerners, European-American people from the Southern United States who identify as such
- Sureños (Spanish for "Southerners"), a group of Mexican-American street gangs in the United States
- Northerner (disambiguation)
- Southern Man (disambiguation)
