= 1788 in sports =

1788 in sports describes the year's events in world sport.

== Boxing ==
Events

- Tom Johnson retained his English championship but no fights involving him are recorded in 1788.
- 31 December — "Big" Ben Brain defeated William Corbally at Navestock in 20 minutes.

== Cricket ==
Events

- Marylebone Cricket Club (MCC) published its version of the Laws of cricket, revising the Star and Garter Laws of 1774

England

- Most runs – Billy Beldham 381
- Most wickets – David Harris 43

== Horse racing ==
England

- The Derby – Sir Thomas
- The Oaks – Nightshade
- St Leger Stakes – Young Flora
