= William South =

William South may refer to:

- William South (photographer), American photographer and inventor
- William South (jockey), British jockey
- William Garnet South, police officer in Alice Springs, Australia
- William Howard South, political figure in Nova Scotia
- Will South, member of the British band Thirteen Senses
