= Wisconsin Shipwreck Coast National Marine Sanctuary =

Protected marine area in Lake Michigan off Wisconsin, United States

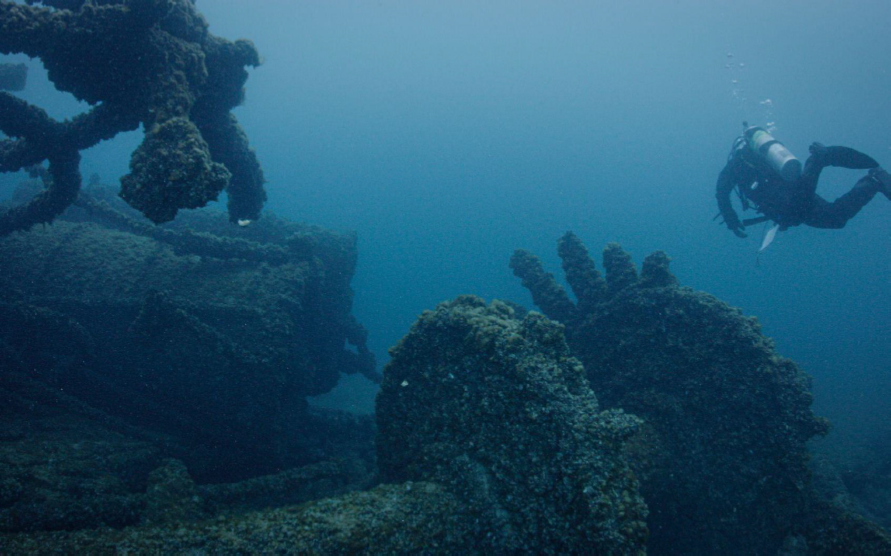
- A National Oceanic and Atmospheric Administration maritime archaeologist conducts a site survey of the wreck of the vessel Niagara in the Wisconsin Shipwreck Coast National Marine Sanctuary on June 8, 2022.

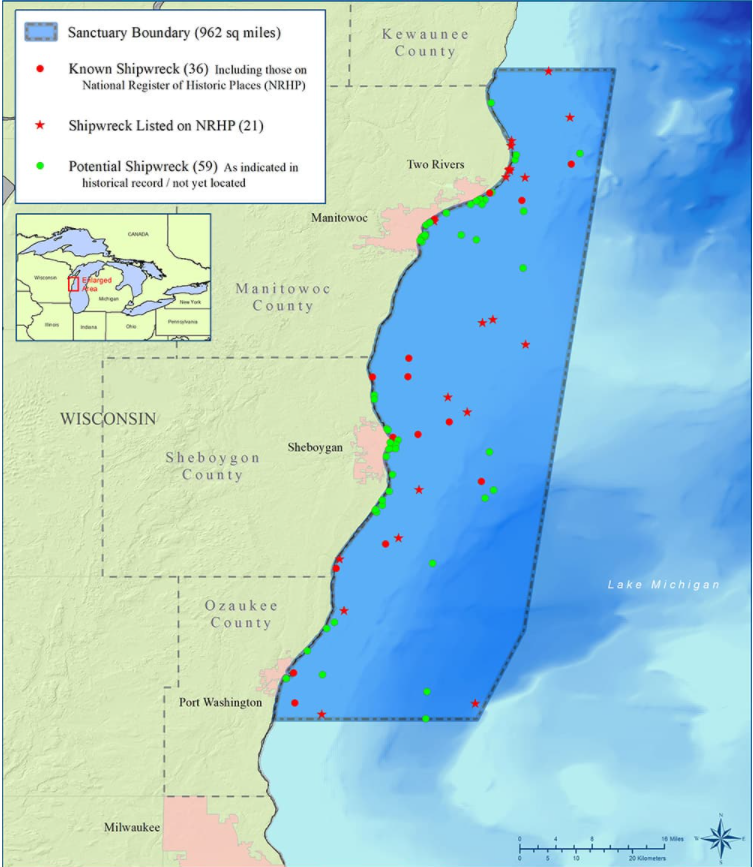
- NOAA map of the Wisconsin Shipwreck Coast National Marine Sanctuary. Red stars indicate shipwrecks on the National Register of Historic Places, red dots are other known shipwrecks, and green dots indicate potential locations of undiscovered shipwrecks.
- Location: Lake Michigan, off Wisconsin, United States
- Coordinates: 44°00′N 87°36′W and vicinity
- Area: 726 sq nmi (962 sq mi; 2,490 km^{2})
- Established: October 9, 2021; 4 years ago
- Governing body: NOAA Office of National Marine Sanctuaries
- Website: sanctuaries.noaa.gov/wisconsin/

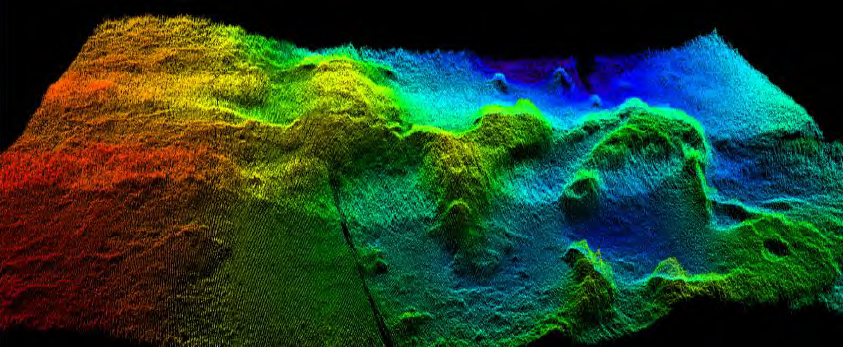
Lakebed mapping image of the sanctuary

The Wisconsin Shipwreck Coast National Marine Sanctuary is a national marine sanctuary administered by the National Oceanic and Atmospheric Administration (NOAA), an agency of the United States Department of Commerce; NOAA co-manages the sanctuary jointly with the State of Wisconsin. It is located in Lake Michigan along the coast of Wisconsin. It was created in 2021 as the 15th national marine sanctuary and protects shipwrecks considered nationally important archaeological resources.

== Description ==
The Wisconsin Shipwreck Coast National Marine Sanctuary covers approximately 726 square nautical miles (962 sq mi; 2,490 km^{2}) in Lake Michigan off Wisconsin's Ozaukee, Sheboygan, Manitowoc, and Kewaunee counties. It includes approximately 82 miles (132 km) of Wisconsin′s coast and lies entirely within the state waters of Wisconsin, extending approximately 7 to 16 miles (6.1 to 13.9 nmi; 11 to 26 km) from the coast. Principal cities along the coast include Port Washington, Sheboygan, Manitowoc, and Two Rivers, Wisconsin.

At the time of its designation in 2021, the sanctuary included 36 known shipwrecks dating from the 1830s to 1930, including Wisconsin's two oldest known shipwrecks in terms of vessel construction date, the schooners Gallinipper, which was constructed in 1833 and sank in 1851, and Home, which was built in 1843 and sank in 1858. The wrecks provide a cross-section of the types of ships that connected Wisconsin with other Great Lakes ports between the early 1800s and the 20th century. Archival research indicates that the sanctuary could include another 59 or 60 such shipwrecks (sources provide both figures) that have yet to be discovered. Twenty-one of the known shipwrecks were listed on the National Register of Historic Places when the sanctuary was designated; by March 2024, 27 of the shipwrecks were listed. Thanks to the cold, fresh water of Lake Michigan, several of the known shipwrecks were essentially intact and looked much like they did when they sank.

NOAA and the State of Wisconsin jointly manage the sanctuary.

== History ==
Indigenous peoples used the waters of what is now the Wisconsin Shipwreck Coast National Marine Sanctuary for trade, communication, and sustenance, for thousands of years before Europeans arrived in the area, and it is likely that they left artifacts behind on the bottom of Lake Michigan. After Europeans began to explore and settle the area, storms and other incidents took their toll on ships, and as of March 2024 Lake Michigan as a whole contained an estimated 780 shipwrecks, of which approximately 250 had been discovered. The waters included in the sanctuary are some of the best-understood in Lake Michigan.

=== Designation ===
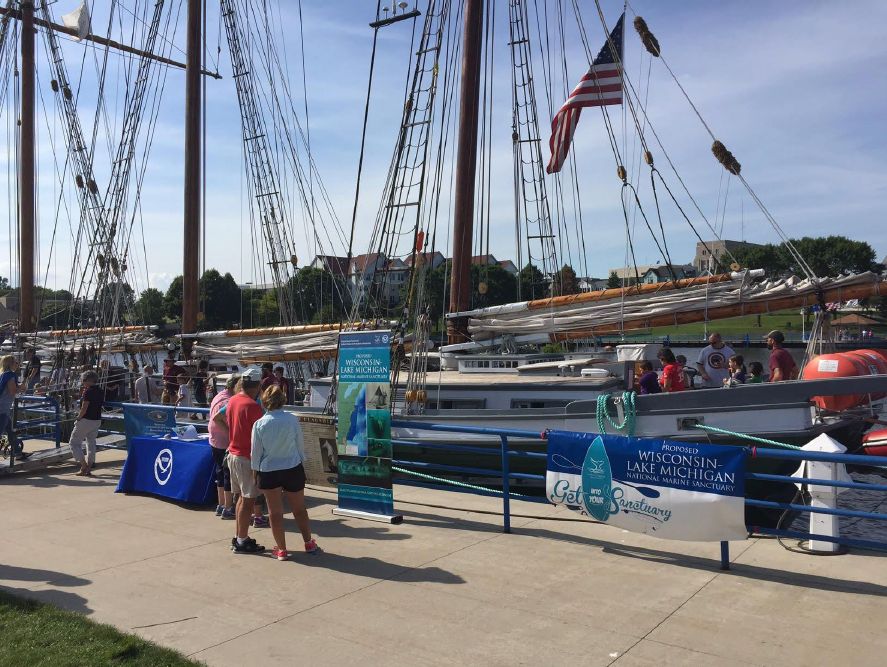
Visitors at a marina in Sheboygan, Wisconsin, during a "Get Into Your Sanctuary" event for the future sanctuary in 2017.

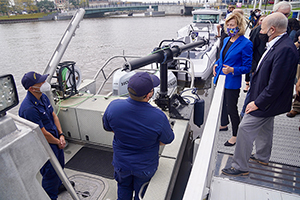
NOAA Commissioned Officer Corps Navigation Response Team officers speak with U.S. Senator Tammy Baldwin and NOAA Administrator Dr. Rick Spinrad at the Wisconsin Maritime Museum in Manitowoc, Wisconsin, during the ceremony finalizing and celebrating the establishment of the Wisconsin Shipwreck Coast National Marine Sanctuary.

In 2008, the Wisconsin Historical Society published a report titled "Wisconsin's Historic Shipwrecks: An Overview and Analysis of Locations for a State/Federal Partnership with the National Marine Sanctuary Program, 2008." Drawing on this report, the State of Wisconsin on December 2, 2014, submitted a nomination asking NOAA to consider designating the area as a national marine sanctuary. On February 5, 2015, NOAA added the area to its inventory of nominated areas eligible for designation as national marine sanctuaries. On October 7, 2015, NOAA announced its intention to designate the area as a sanctuary, initiating a 90-day public comment period during which NOAA held three public meetings on the designation in November 2015. On January 9, 2017, NOAA published a notice of its intention to designate a 1,075-square-mile (2,780 km^{2}) area as the Wisconsin-Lake Michigan National Marine Sanctuary, containing the sites of 37 known historic shipwrecks. An 81-day public comment period and a series of four meetings in the Wisconsin towns of Algoma, Manitowoc, Sheboygan, and Port Washington during the week of March 13, 2017, followed which led NOAA to alter the sanctuary's boundaries, reducing its area to 926 square miles (2,400 km^{2}), including 36 known historic shipwrecks, and to change its name to Wisconsin Shipwreck Coast National Marine Sanctuary. However, President Donald Trump, who took office on January 20, 2017, signed an executive order prohibiting the naming of most new national marine sanctuaries in order to allow more offshore drilling for oil and natural gas in the waters of the United States, prompting Wisconsin Governor Scott Walker to rescind Wisconsin's nomination of the sanctuary.

After Tony Evers took office as governor of Wisconsin in 2019, he asked NOAA to renew the proposal for the sanctuary. NOAA published an environmental impact statement and final management plan in June 2020, designated the area as a sanctuary on June 22, 2021, and published the designation in the Federal Register on June 23, 2021. The designation was to take effect formally in the autumn of 2021 following 45 days of continuous session of the United States Congress after publication of the designation in the Federal Register. After the 45-day review period in Congress and by the Governor of Wisconsin was complete, the designation became effective on August 16, 2021. The designation was finalized and celebrated in ceremony attended by U.S. Senator Tammy Baldwin, Governor of Wisconsin Tony Evers, NOAA Administrator Dr. Rick Spinrad, and local officials at the Wisconsin Maritime Museum in Manitowoc on October 9, 2021. The Wisconsin Shipwreck Coast National Marine Sanctuary was the first national marine sanctuary created in the United States since the designation of Mallows Bay, Maryland, as a sanctuary in 2019.

Upon designating the area as a sanctuary, NOAA announced that it would stay a prohibition on grappling into or anchoring on shipwreck sites in the sanctuary until October 1, 2023. The delay in the imposition of this regulation was intended to give NOAA time to install mooring buoys that would make anchoring or grappling unnecessary, establish policies allowing access to shipwrecks where mooring buoys would not be installed, and explore the possibility of allowing some diving activities it originally intended to prohibit, such as allowing divers to attach mooring lines directly to some shipwrecks. The designation is the second of its kind for the Great Lakes and the first for Lake Michigan.

=== 2021 ===
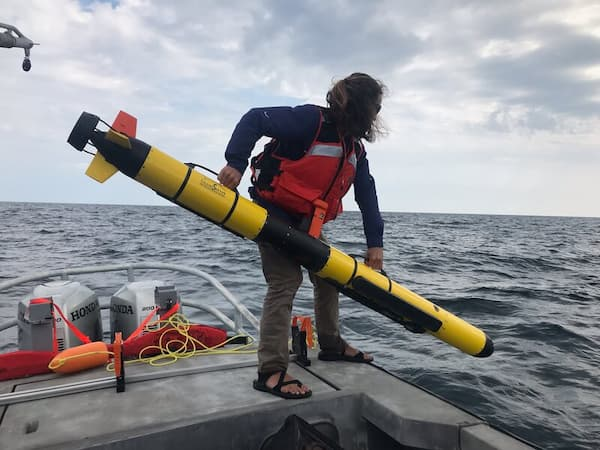
A University of Delaware graduate student launches an autonomous underwater vehicle in the Wisconsin Shipwreck Coast National Marine Sanctuary in the summer of 2021.

The NOAA Office of Coast Survey began a survey of the sanctuary's waters in June 2021 to collect data in support of nautical charting of the waters and archaeological studies of cultural resources in the sanctuary, but mechanical problems forced a delay. The survey resumed in early October 2021. By the time it concluded on October 22, the NOAA team had surveyed 70 square miles (53 sq nmi; 180 km^{2}) of the lakebed near Manitowoc and Sheboygan, including four known shipwrecks.

During 2021, the sanctuary installed three real-time wind-and-wave buoys also capable of providing real-time water temperatures at different depths in sanctuary waters off Port Washington, Sheboygan, and Two Rivers. The buoys were intended to enhance boating safety and fishing in the sanctuary. The sanctuary also teamed with its research partners to use autonomous underwater vehicles to explore sanctuary waters off Two Rivers as part of a NOAA-led search for maritime heritage resources in Lake Michigan and Lake Ontario between July 28 and August 20, 2021.

=== 2022 ===
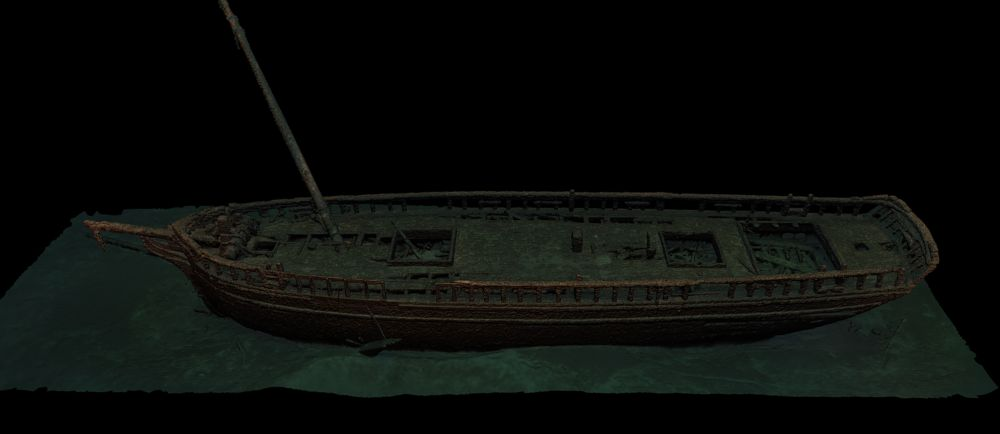
Still image of a photogrammetric model of the wreck of the schooner Northerner created from imagery taken by NOAA personnel in the Wisconsin Shipwreck Coast National Marine Sanctuary on June 11, 2022

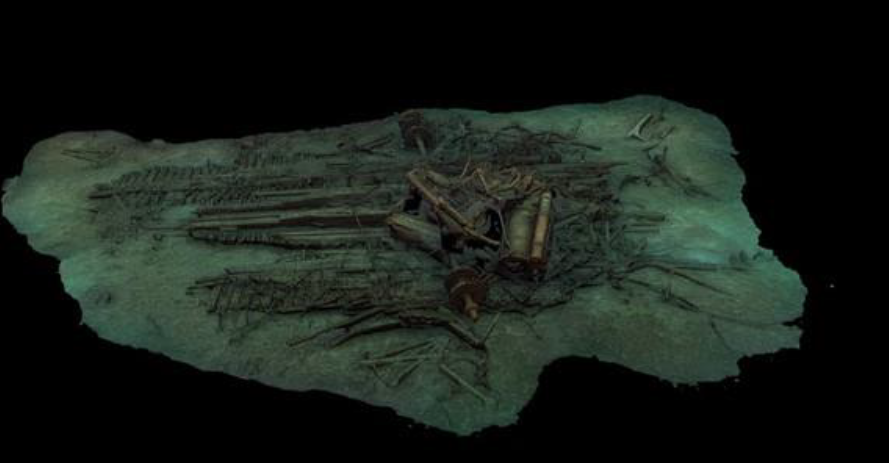
A three-dimensional model created by NOAA of the wreck of the paddle steamer Niagara in the Wisconsin Shipwreck Coast National Marine Sanctuary.

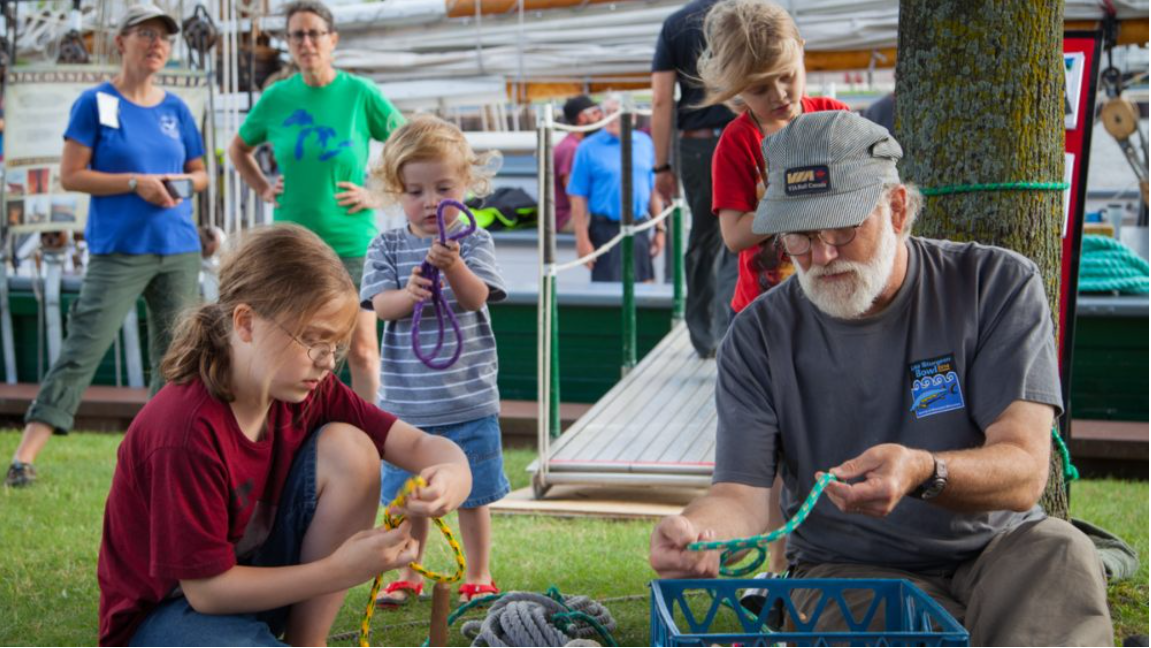
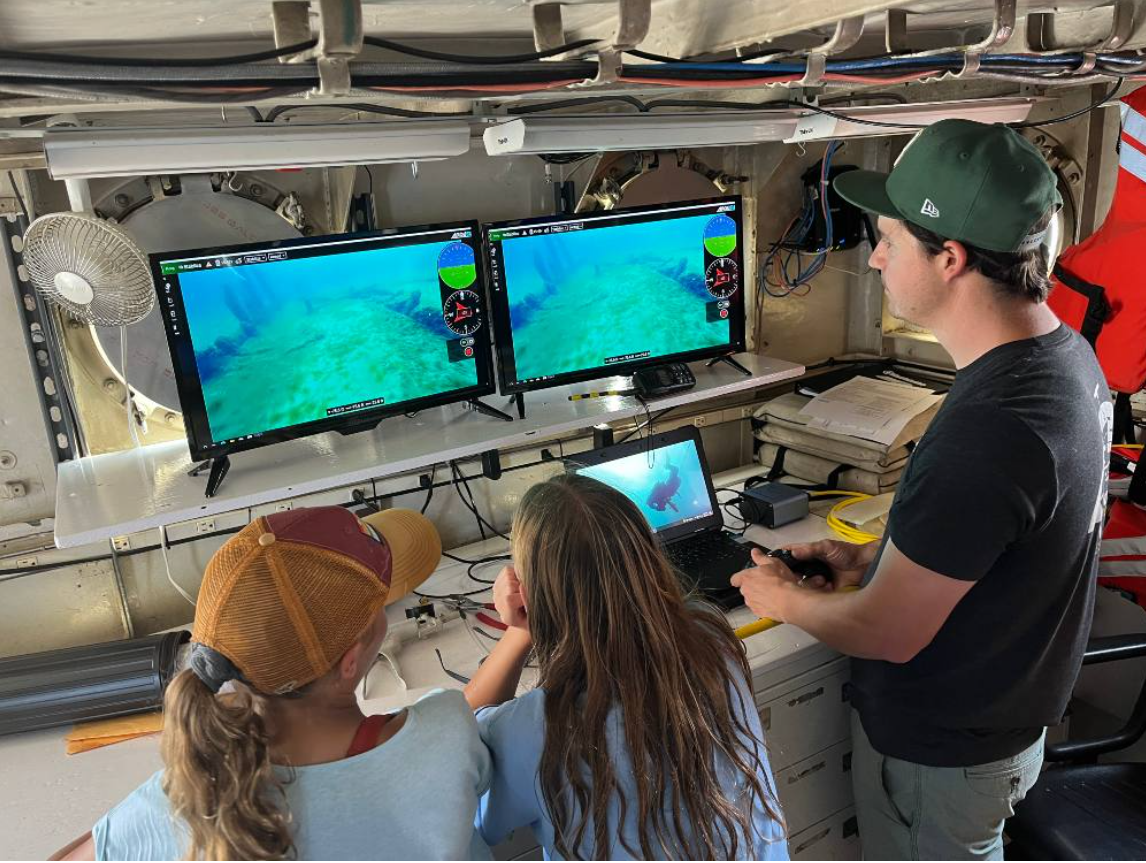
Children learn to tie nautical knots at the sanctuary (left) and explore the sanctuary with a remotely operated underwater vehicle from aboard a University of Wisconsin–Milwaukee research vessel during a "Get Into Your Sanctuary" event (right).

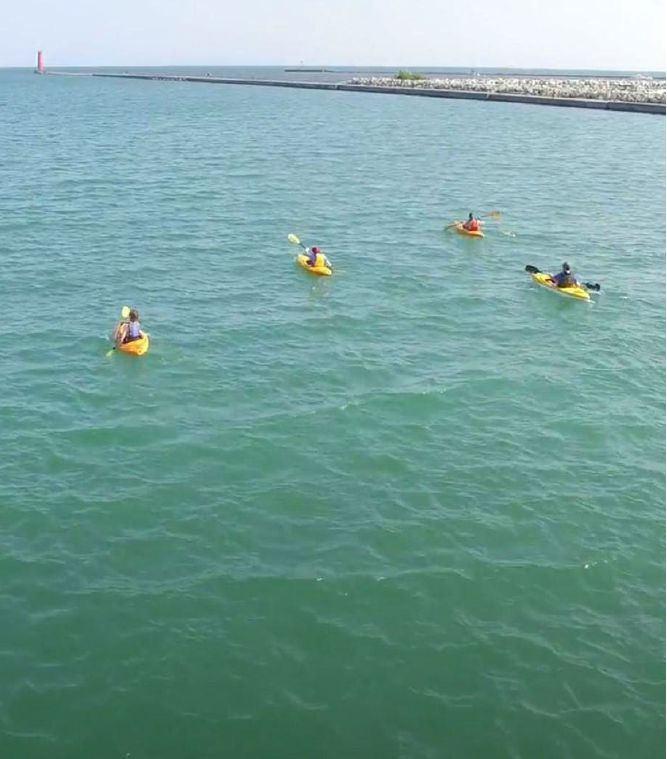
Kayakers set out from Sheboygan, Wisconsin, to explore the sanctuary.

During 2022, the NOAA Office of Coast Survey awarded a contract for a high-resolution, sonar-based mapping of most of the sanctuary′s lakebed, following up on the pilot mapping project carried out in 2021. The sanctuary also participated in the creation of a podcast and digital short promoting tourism in the communities along Wisconsin′s mid-Lake Michigan coast and co-sponsored a hands-on learning experience about marine technology and archaeology for 20 Wisconsin teachers from the Manitowoc-Two Rivers area, Milwaukee, and Green Bay. By 2022, a study was underway to explore the creation of a NOAA facility along the Wisconsin coast to support the sanctuary.

In June 2022, a NOAA Office of National Marine Sanctuaries team conducted maritime archaeological assessments at 11 shipwreck sites and sonar mapping at 13 sites and collected 6k video and virtual reality footage to collect data in support of resource monitoring, mooring buoy, and education and outreach programs in the sanctuary.

In August 2022, the sanctuary began accepting applications to serve on its 15-seat advisory council, made up of members of the local community, with applications due by October 1, 2022. The creation of an advisory council is a standard practice for U.S. national marine sanctuaries.

=== 2023 ===
In September 2023, maritime historicans announced the July 2023 discovery of the wreck of the 140-foot (43 m) American schooner Trinidad, which sank on May 11, 1881, in 270 feet (82 m) of water off the coast of Wisconsin near Algoma. The wreck was in "pristine" condition, but lies just outside the national marine sanctuary, prompting its discoverers to make plans to work with the Wisconsin Historical Society to request its addition to the National Register of Historic Places in order to increase its visibility as an historically important shipwreck and to ensure its protection.

NOAA′s plans to install mooring buoys in the sanctuary during the summer of 2023 went unfulfilled because NOAA's partner organizations were unable to provide ship time for the buoy installation effort. On September 29, 2023, the NOAA Office of National Marine Sanctuaries extended the stay on the prohibition of grappling into or anchoring on shipwreck sites in the sanctuary from October 1, 2023, to October 1, 2024, to allow an additional year to address public comments on the effect of the prohibition on commercial shipping and engage in outreach to educate the public on the location of shipwrecks and non-destructive means for mooring to them, as well as to delay the prohibition until after the installation of mooring buoys, which NOAA rescheduled for the summer of 2024.

In September 2023, the Wisconsin Shipwreck Coast National Marine Sanctuary published two studies of Maritime Cultural Landscapes (MCLs), additions to a series of MCLs published by the Office of National Marine Sanctuaries which describe "places where the interactions of culture and nature have resulted in identifiable cultural and ecological imprints." One of the studies examined key cultural landscape connections unique to the sanctuary, while the other provided an in-depth look at commercial fishing along the shore of Lake Michigan.

=== 2024 ===
During the summer of 2024, the Wisconsin Shipwreck Coast National Marine Sanctuary installed moorings at 24 shipwreck sites in the sanctuary. The moorings were intended to facilitate diving and paddling, make diving safer, and protect shipwrecks in the sanctuary from damage by anchors.

== Gallery ==
Shipwrecks in the Wisconsin Shipwreck Coast National Marine Sanctuary
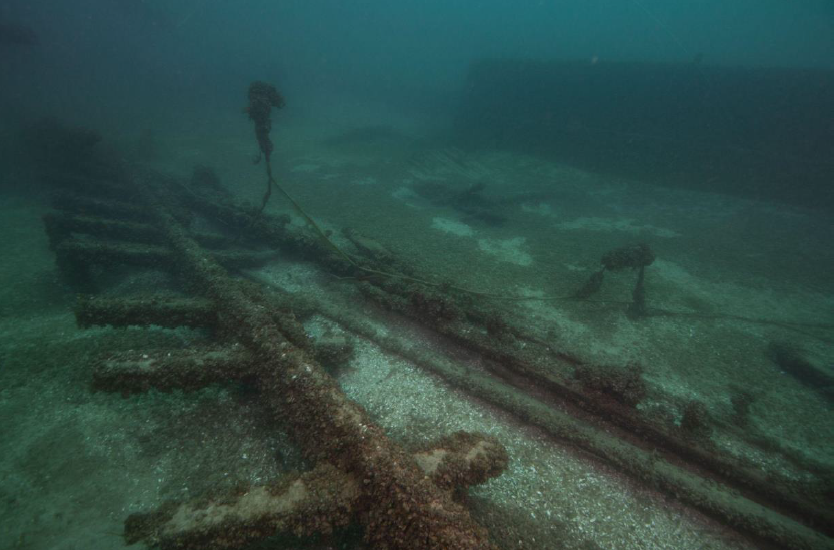
The schooner Advance on June 9, 2022

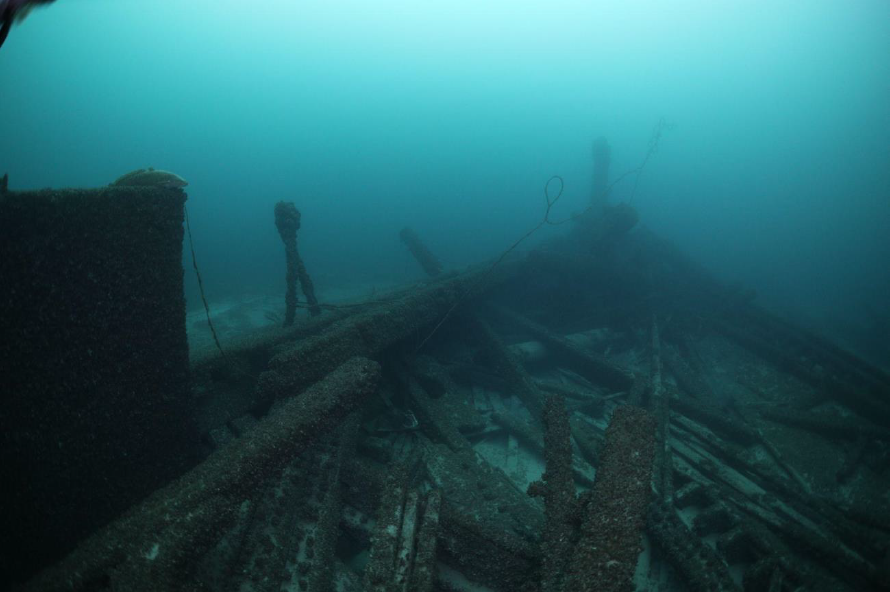
Bow section of the schooner America on June 13, 2022

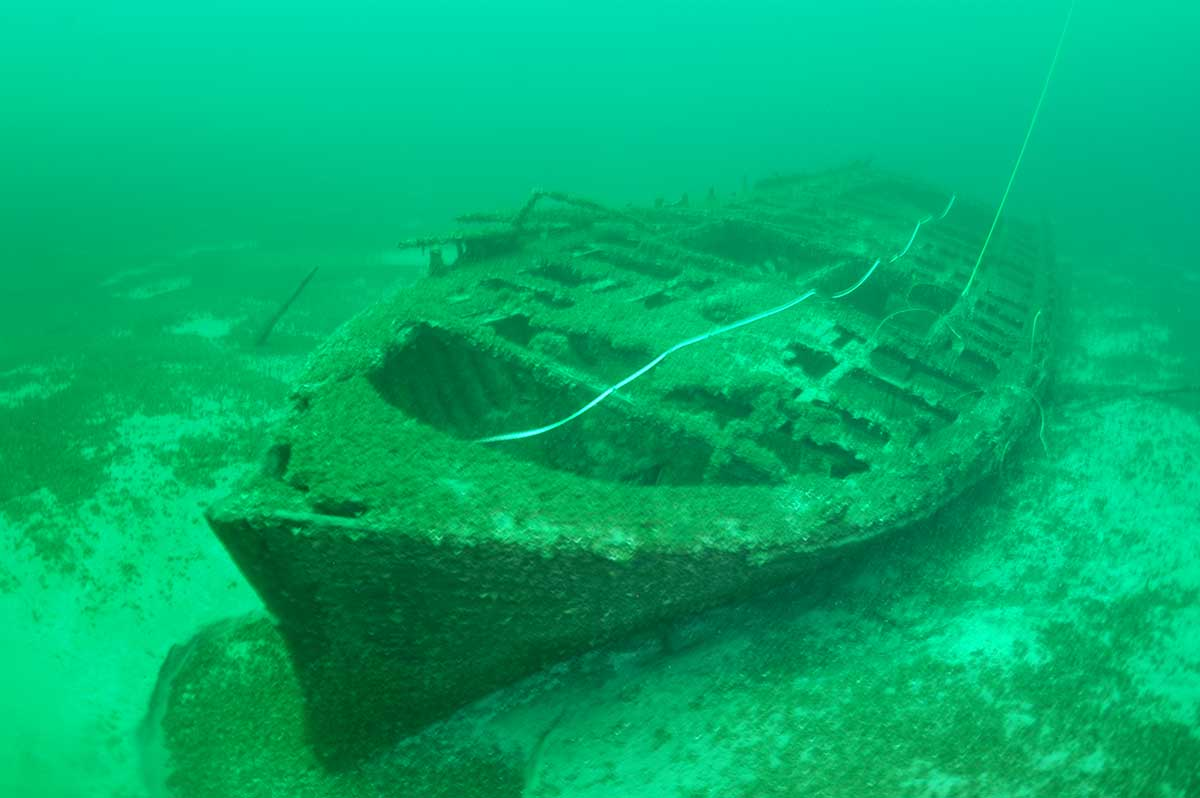
Schooner Byron

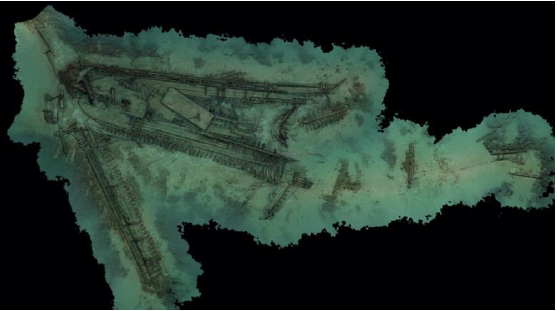
Photomosaic of the schooner Mahoning

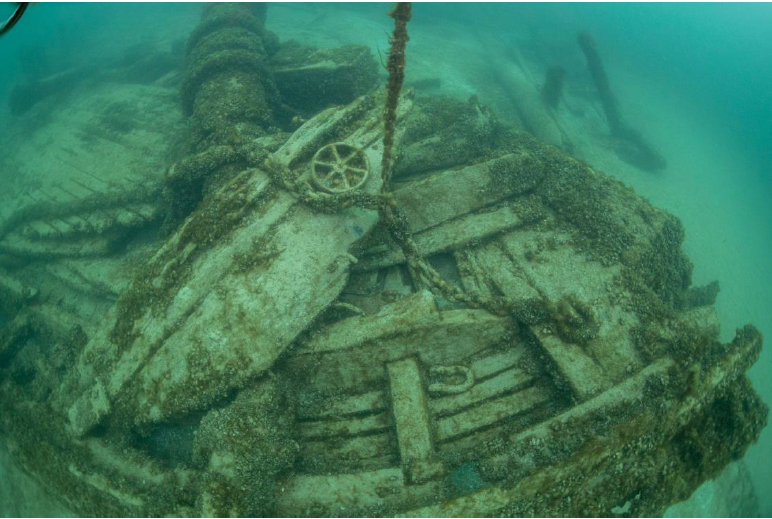
Bow section of the schooner Mahoning on June 11, 2022

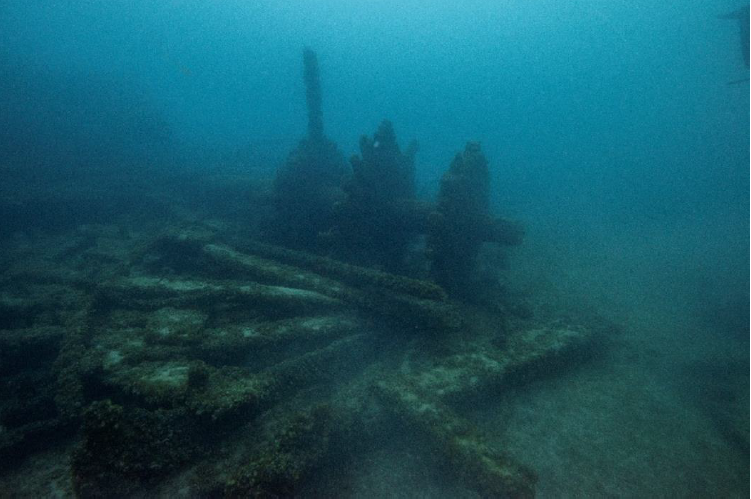
The wreck of the paddle steamer Niagara, featuring one of the ship's broken paddle wheels

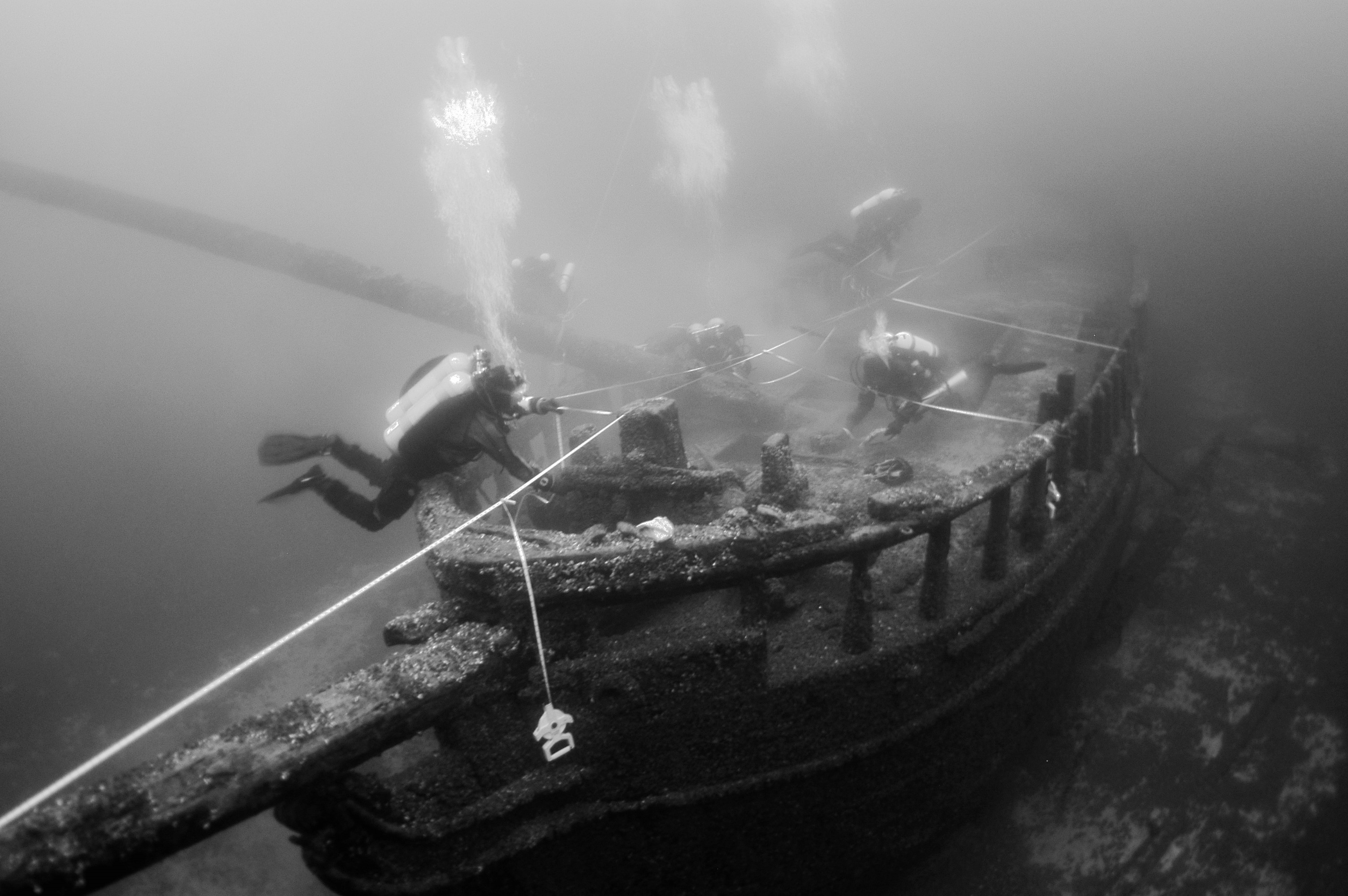
The schooner Northerner on May 6, 2010

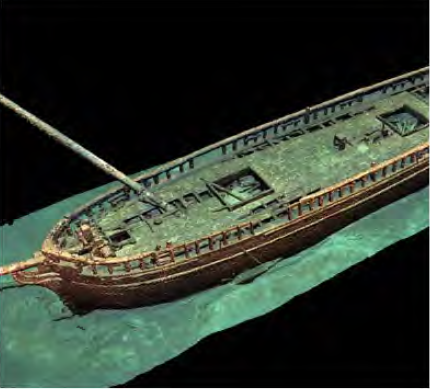
Northerner

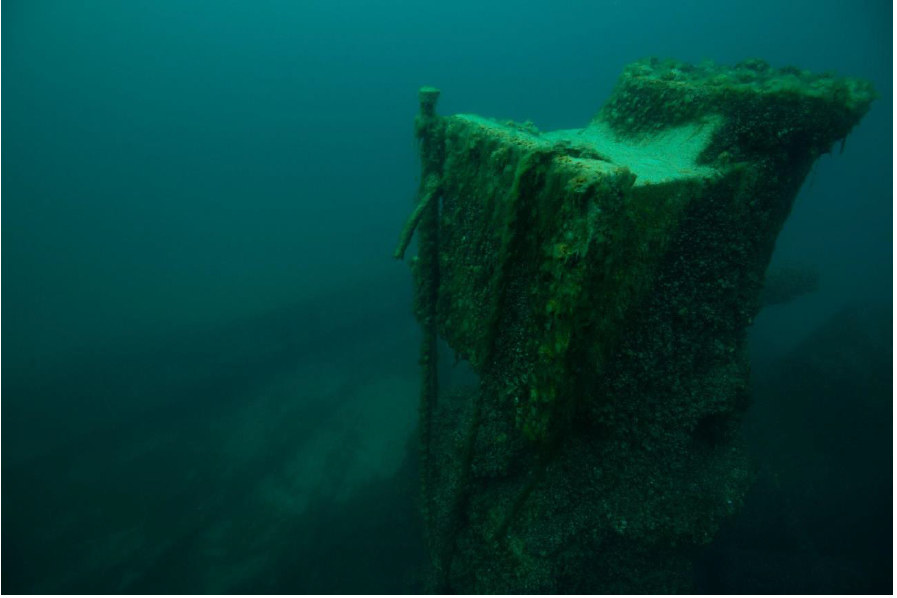
The steam engine of the steam barge Selah Chamberlain on June 13, 2022

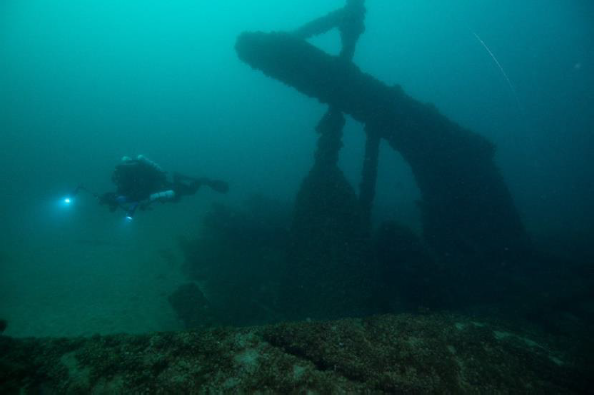
A maritime archaeologist documents the stern of the wreck of Selah Chamberlain.

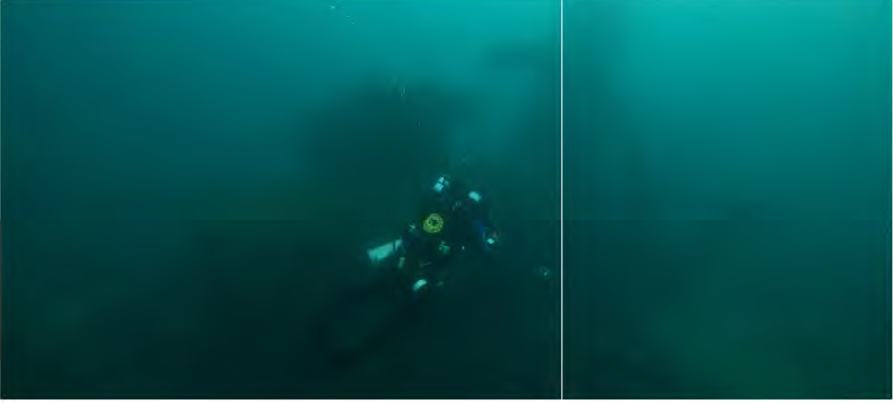
A scuba diver explores the wreck of Selah Chamberlain.

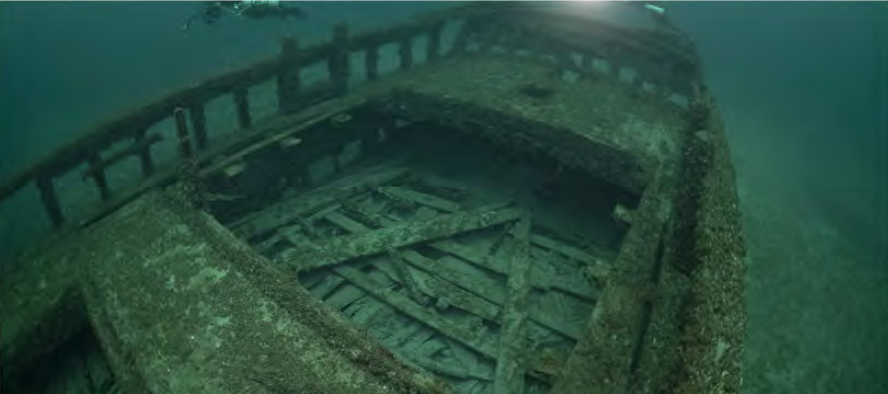
Unidentified shipwreck.
