= South High School =

South High School may refer to the following high schools in the United States:

- South High School (Bakersfield, California)
- South High School (Torrance, California)
- South High School (Denver, Colorado)
- South High School (Pueblo, Colorado)
- South High School (Akron, Ohio), closed 1967
- South High School (Cleveland, Ohio), closed 2010
- South High School (Columbus, Ohio)
- South High School (Springfield, Ohio), closed 2002
- South High School (Willoughby, Ohio)
- South High School (Youngstown, Ohio), closed in 1993
- South High School (Minnesota) in Minneapolis
- South High School (Michigan), in Grand Rapids, closed 1968
- South High School (Utah) in Salt Lake City, closed 1988

== Schools with variant names ==
- Central Bucks South High School in Warrington, Pennsylvania
- Cheyenne South High School in Cheyenne, Wyoming
- Crystal Lake South High School in Crystal Lake, Illinois
- Downers Grove South High School, in Downers Grove, Illinois
- Fargo South High School in Fargo, North Dakota
- William A. Shine Great Neck South High School in Lake Success, New York
- Maine South High School in Park Ridge, Illinois
- Newton South High School in Newton, Massachusetts
- Omaha South High School in Omaha, Nebraska
- Parkersburg South High School in Parkersburg, West Virginia
- Plainfield South High School in Plainfield, Illinois
- Sheboygan South High School in Sheboygan, Wisconsin
- South Anchorage High School in Anchorage, Alaska
- South Division High School in Chicago, Illinois, later renamed Wendell Phillips Academy High School
- South Division High School in Milwaukee, Wisconsin
- South High Community School in Worcester, Massachusetts
- Valley Stream South High School in Valley Stream, New York
- Waukesha South High School, in Waukesha, Wisconsin
- Williamsville South High School in Williamsville, New York

== See also ==
- Southern High School (disambiguation)
- Southside High School (disambiguation)
