= Southern (surname) =

Southern is an English surname. Notable people with the surname include:

- Caleb Southern (born 1969), American music producer
- Clara Southern (1860–1940), Australian painter
- Edwin Southern (born 1938), English molecular biologist
- Eileen Southern (1920–2002), American musicologist
- Jack Southern (1874–1919), Australian rules footballer
- Jeri Southern (1926–1991, born as Genevieve Hering), American jazz pianist and singer
- John Southern (cricketer, born 1952) (born 1952), English first-class cricketer.
- John Southern (engineer) (c.1758–1815), English engineer,
- J. T. Southern (born 1964), American professional wrestler
- Keith Southern (born 1981), English footballer
- Lauren Southern (born 1995), Canadian political activist
- Margaret Southern (born 1931), Canadian businesswoman
- Richard Southern (theatre designer) (1903–1989), British theatre designer
- R. W. Southern (1912–2001), British medieval historian
- Sarah Southern (born 1980), British businesswoman and politician
- Steve Southern (born 1982), Australian rugby player
- Terry Southern (1924–1995), American writer

== See also ==
- Sothern
