= Souths =

Souths may refer to:

- South Sydney Rabbitohs, a National Rugby League team
- Souths Rugby, a Queensland Premier Rugby team
- Souths Logan Magpies, a rugby league team based in the southern suburbs of Brisbane, Australia

== See also ==
- South (disambiguation)
