= SS Selah Chamberlain =

Great Lakes freighter that sank on Lake Michigan in 1886

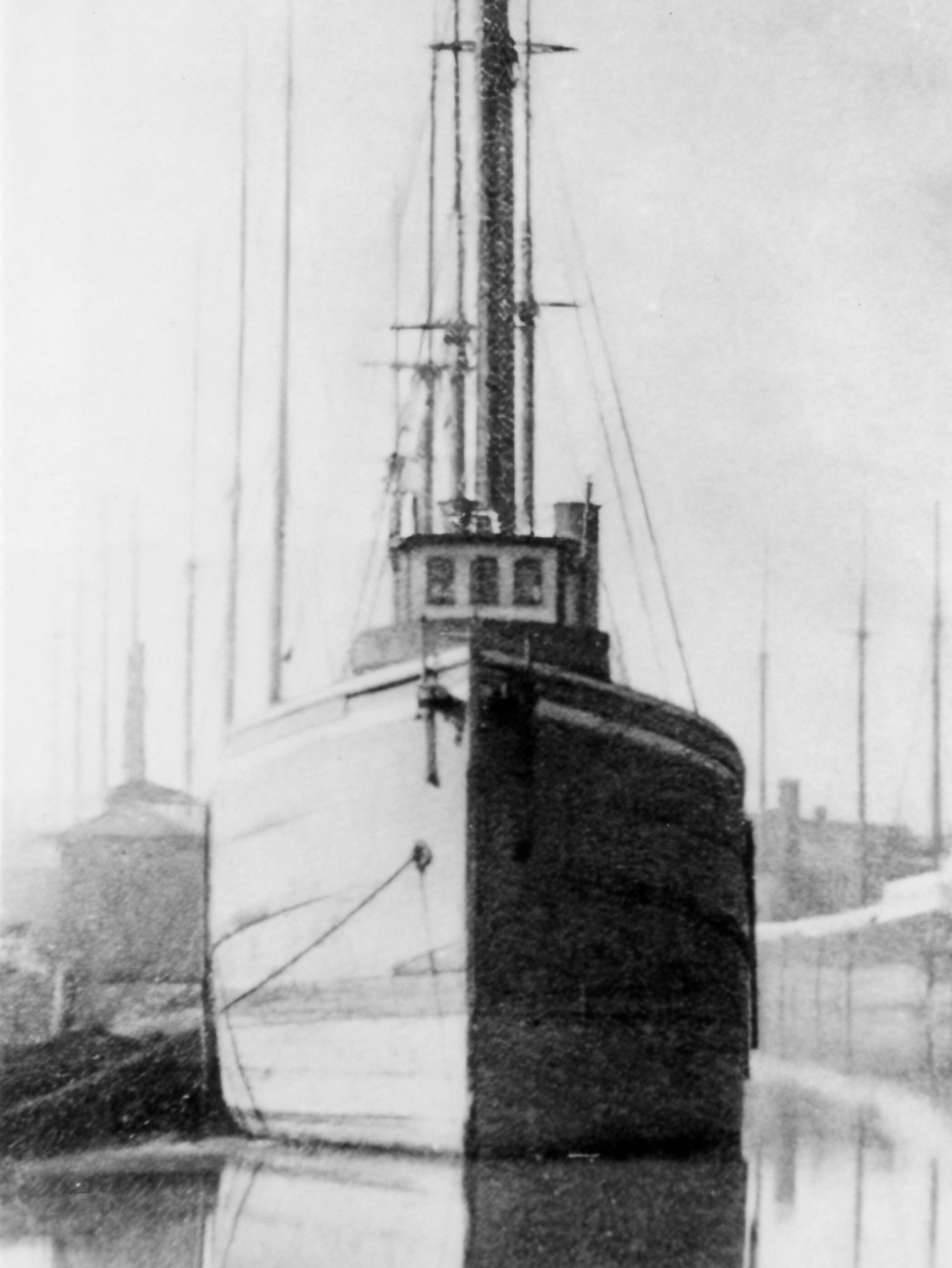
- Selah Chamberlain in Cleveland, Ohio

History

United States
- Name: Selah Chamberlain
- Operator: Alva Bradley 1873–1883; Bradley Transportation Company 1883–1886
- Port of registry: United States, Cleveland, Ohio
- Builder: Quayle & Martin
- Launched: April 1, 1873
- Maiden voyage: May 11, 1873
- In service: May 1, 1873
- Identification: U.S. Registry #115147
- Fate: Sunk in collision October 13, 1886

General characteristics
- Class & type: Lake freighter
- Tonnage: 1,207.01 GRT; 963.98 NRT
- Length: 212 ft (65 m)
- Beam: 34 ft (10 m)
- Height: 14.8 ft (4.5 m)
- Installed power: 2 x Scotch marine boiler
- Propulsion: Non-condensing engine

National Register of Historic Places data
SELAH CHAMBERLAIN (bulk carrier) Shipwreck
U.S. National Register of Historic Places
Location within Wisconsin Location within the United States
Location	2 miles NE of Sheboygan Pt. in Lake Michigan
Nearest city	Sheboygan, Wisconsin
Coordinates	43.769933°N 87.656683°W
Built	1873 in Cleveland, Ohio
Architect	Quayle & Martin
Architectural style	Bulk freighter
MPS	Great Lakes Shipwreck Sites of Wisconsin MPS
NRHP reference No.	100003288
Added to NRHP	January 7, 2019

SS Selah Chamberlain was a wooden-hulled Great Lakes freighter that sank with the loss of five lives in Lake Michigan in 1886, 6 miles (10 km) off the coast of Sheboygan, Sheboygan County, Wisconsin, United States, after being rammed by the steamer John Pridgeon Jr.. On January 7, 2019, the wreck of Selah Chamberlain was listed on the National Register of Historic Places, and was given the reference number 100003288.

== History ==
=== Construction ===
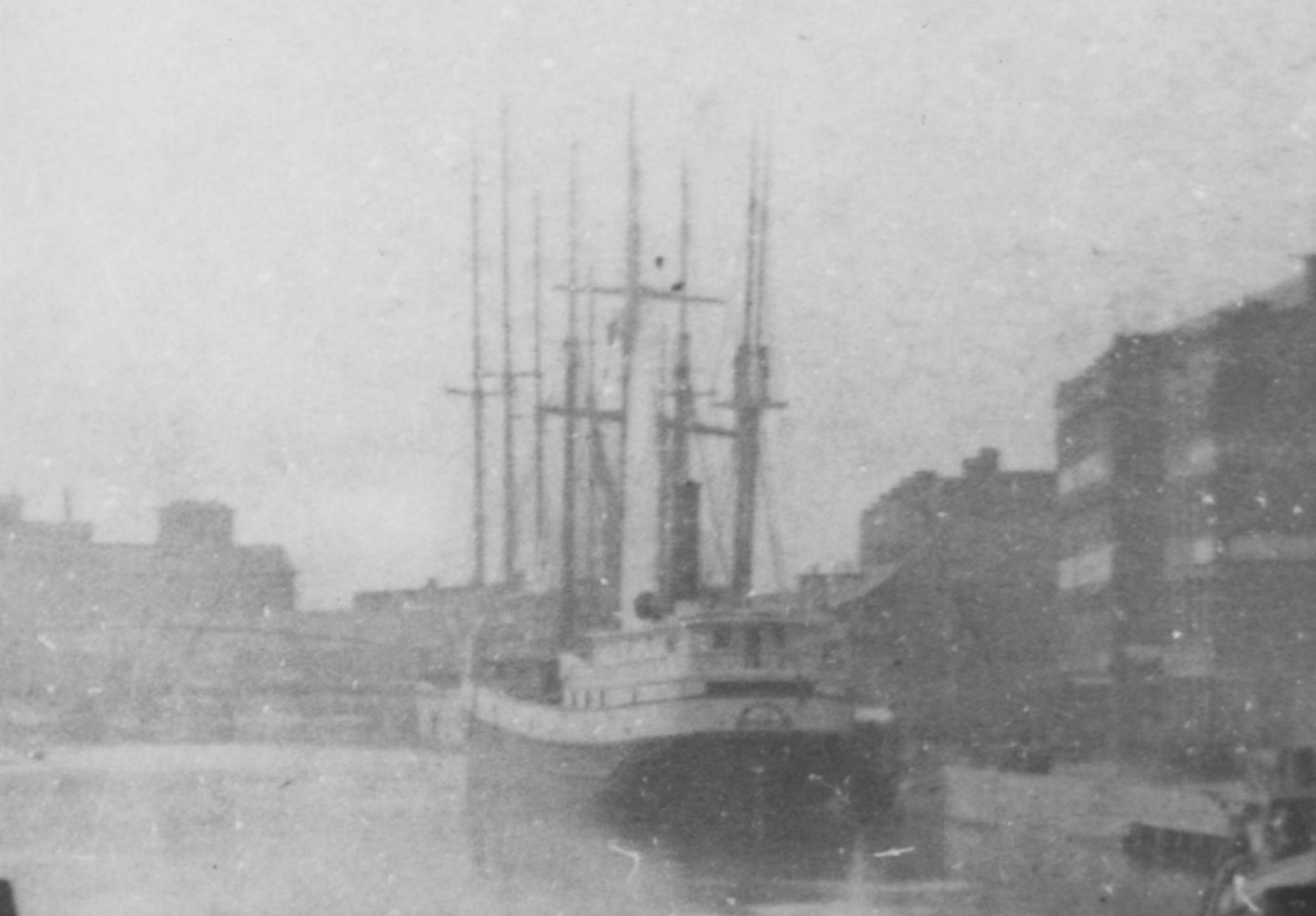
Selah Chamberlain in Cleveland, Ohio circa 1875.

Selah Chamberlain (Official number 115147) was built in 1873 by Quayle & Martin shipyard of Cleveland, Ohio. Her wooden hull was 212 feet (65 m) long, her beam was 34 feet (10 m) wide and her hull had a depth of 14.8 feet (4.5 m). She originally had a gross tonnage of 894.69 tons. She was powered by a two-cylinder high pressure engine, the cylinders of which each had a 30 inch (76 cm) bore; the engine was fueled by two 7.3 by 7.95 feet (2.23 m × 2.42 m) tubular firebox boilers. Both the engine and the boilers were built by the Globe Iron Works Company of Cleveland, Ohio. She also had three masts and at the start of her career, a single deck. In her early career she was also classified as a steam barge. She was generally used to carry cargo such as iron ore, coal and grain between Duluth, Minnesota, and Buffalo, New York. She often regularly towed a schooner barge. She was originally built for Alva Bradley of Cleveland, Ohio.

=== Service history ===
On May 11, 1873 while Selah Chamberlain was on her maiden voyage bound from Cleveland, Ohio for Escanaba, Michigan, where she would load a cargo of iron ore, she ran aground on Bois Blanc Island while trying to negotiate the Straits of Mackinac. Fortunately, Selah Chamberlain received no major damage and was able to resume her journey the next day.

In 1874 she had a second deck added, increasing her cargo carrying capacity, and increasing her gross tonnage to 1207.01 tons and her net tonnage to 963.98 tons.

In May, 1881 Selah Chamberlain received repairs at the Globe Dry Docks at Cleveland, Ohio. In 1883 she was transferred to the Bradley Transportation Company.

On November 15, 1883 Selah Chamberlain lost her main mast, and got her rigging entangled in her propeller on Lake Superior. In 1884 she was chartered to carry wheat from Duluth, Minnesota to Buffalo, New York for three runs.

In October, 1884 while towing the schooner barge John Martin, Selah Chamberlain encountered a gale and was driven against the Canadian Pacific Railway coal docks in Port Arthur, Ontario, causing approximately $1,500 worth of damage to them. The Duluth News Tribune published the following article about the event:

Early Sunday morning the (steam) barge Chamberlain towing the schooner John Martin, arrived light to take out wheat. The wind was strong from the northeast, and as usual under such circumstances, a powerful current was running out of the canal. The barge entered all right, but the current caught the schooner and through her upon the bulkhead of the South pier. To prevent serious damage to the vessel, the tow line was cast off, and she swung around the pier and down towards to the beach on the South side. Both anchors were dropped, but the distance was so short and her momentum so great that they dragged and she went high on the beach, after breaking down some of the trestle work leading to the lighthouse at the end of the pier. The tugs in the harbor were powerless to render any assistance until the sea went down. Yesterday the tugs Mollie Spencer, Nellie Cotton, and Brower, and the barges Chamberlain and E.B. Hale were busy in an effort to dredge and pull her off. It was not until the middle of the afternoon that they succeeded, and the Martin reached her dock. She is not damaged. In making for the Northern Pacific dock when she entered the harbor Sunday morning, the barge Chamberlain ran clear through the middle of the wagon bridge between that dock and the Northwest Coal docks. The bridge was impassible yesterday, but the barge was not injured.

In 1885 Selah Chamberlain received new upper decks and was re-caulked. She spent the entire year hauling iron ore and grain with the schooner barge John Martin and several other schooner barges.

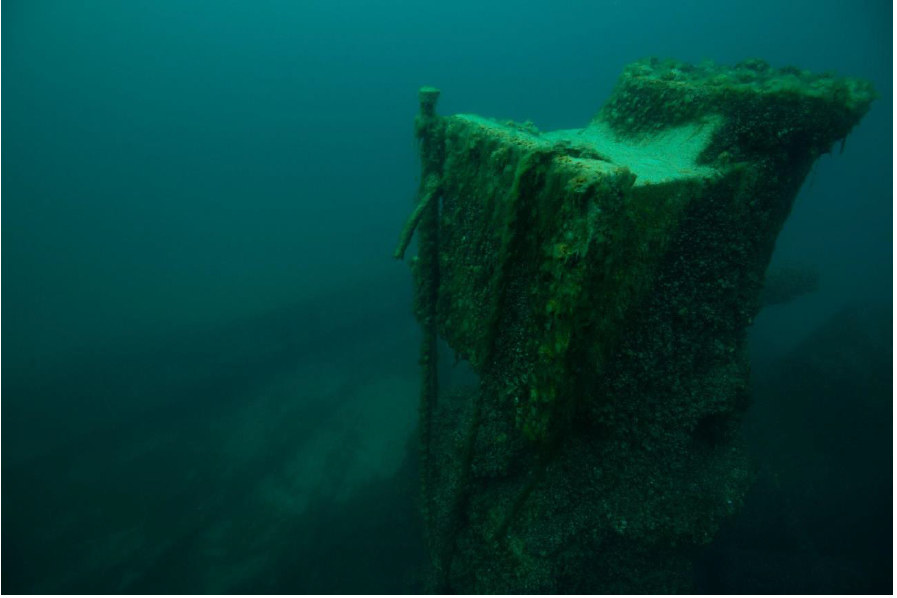
Steam engine in wreck of Selah Chamberlain, June 13, 2022.

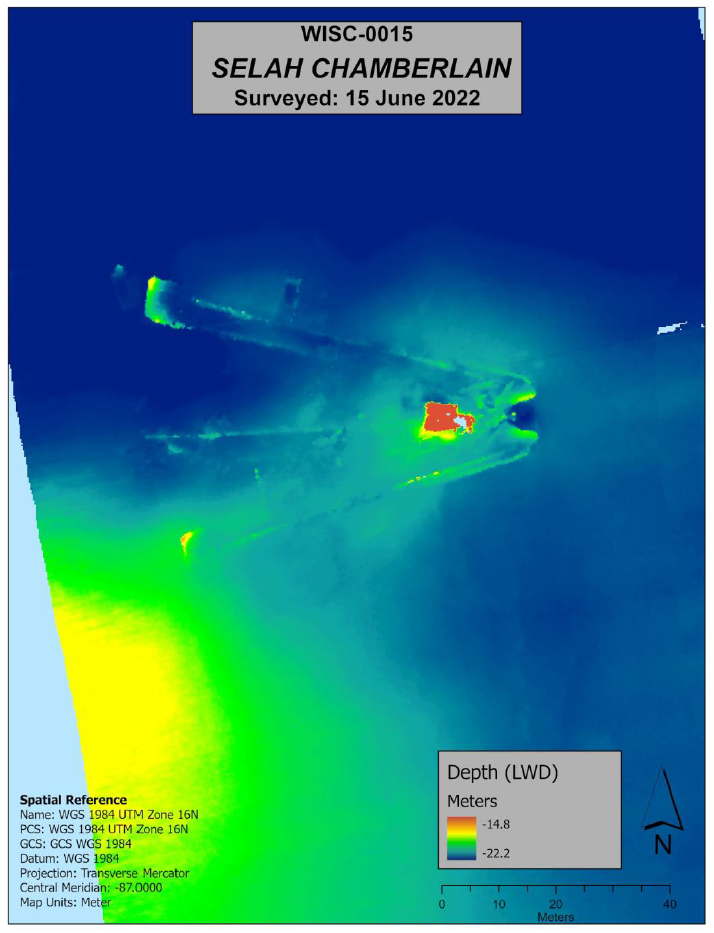
Sonar image of the wreck of Selah Chamberlain, June 15, 2022.

=== Final voyage ===
On October 13, 1886, Selah Chamberlain and her schooner barge, Fayette Brown were bound from Milwaukee, Wisconsin, to Escanaba, Michigan, to load up a cargo of iron ore which they would then transport to Cleveland, Ohio. As they were sailing north, they encountered a dense fog. At approximately 8:30 p.m., and about 7 miles (11 km) off shore, Selah Chamberlain's crew heard another vessel's whistle directly ahead. Captain A. Greenly immediately signaled her whistle once, and then steered her to port. However, the collision was unavoidable and Selah Chamberlain was struck in her port bow by the slightly larger, and newer John Pridgeon Jr. After the collision, the crew of Selah Chamberlain cut Fayette Brown loose, so if Selah Chamberlain sank, she would not sink Fayette Brown as well. Selah Chamberlain sank approximately 15 minutes after the collision. Over the next few years, a number of unsuccessful operations to raise Selah Chamberlain were carried out.

== Selah Chamberlain today ==
The remains of Selah Chamberlain lie 2 nautical miles (3.7 km; 2.3 mi) northeast of Sheboygan Point in 90 feet (27 m) of water within the boundaries of the Wisconsin Shipwreck Coast National Marine Sanctuary. Her wreck is broken into three pieces. Much of her lower hull remains on the site, and her fantail stern is split, exposing her two boilers and her engine. Her wooden floors are reinforced with steel I-beams. Her tandem engine, and its decorated cast iron frame rise 25 feet (8 m) from the bottom of the lake.
