= Southerly =

Southerly may refer to:

- Southerly (band), American rock group of the 2000s
- Southerly (journal), Australian literary magazine
- Southerly, Devon, a location in England
- Southerly buster, a type of wind in the southern regions of New South Wales and Victoria, Australia
- Southerly Magazine, American cultural magazine

== See also ==
- Southern (disambiguation)
