= Southern Football League (disambiguation) =

Southern Football League is an association football league in England.

Southern Football League may also refer to:

- Southern Football League (1963–1965), a minor professional American football league in which Huntsville Rockets played
- Southern Football League (Scotland), Scottish war time league
- Southern Football League (South Australia), an Australian rules football league in South Australia, Australia
- Southern Football League (Tasmania), an amateur Australian rules football league in Tasmania, Australia
- Southern Football Netball League, an amateur Australian rules football league in Victoria, Australia

== See also ==
- Great Southern Football League (disambiguation)
- Southern League (disambiguation)
