= South River =

South River may refer to:

== In Canada ==
- South River, Newfoundland and Labrador, a town
- South River, Ontario, a village
- South River (Ontario), a tributary of Lake Nipissing
- South River, former name of the Koksoak River in Quebec

== In China ==
- Rong River (Guangdong), also known as South River

== In the United States ==
- Delaware River, referred to as the South River in colonial times
- Georgia
  - South River (Darien River tributary)
  - South River (Ocmulgee River tributary)
- Iowa
  - South River (Iowa), a tributary of the Des Moines River
- Maryland
  - South River (Maryland), a tributary of Chesapeake Bay
  - South River, Maryland, a community in Anne Arundel County
- Massachusetts
  - South River (Deerfield River tributary), see List of rivers of Massachusetts
  - South River (Massachusetts Bay), see List of rivers of Massachusetts
- New Hampshire and Maine
  - South River (Ossipee River tributary)
- New Jersey
  - South River (Great Egg Harbor River tributary)
  - South River (Raritan River tributary)
    - South River, New Jersey, a borough in Middlesex County named after the river
- North Carolina
  - South River (North Carolina), a tributary of the Black River
  - South River (Neuse River estuary)
- Virginia
  - South River (Mattaponi River tributary)
  - South River (Maury River tributary)
  - South River (Rapidan River tributary)
  - South River (South Fork Shenandoah River tributary)

== See also ==
- South (disambiguation)
- Southern River (disambiguation)
