= Southern River =

Southern River may refer to:

- Southern River (Western Australia), a tributary of Canning River (Western Australia)
- Southern River, Western Australia, a suburb of Perth, Western Australia
- Electoral district of Southern River, an electorate of the Western Australian Legislative Assembly

== See also ==
- South River (disambiguation)
