= Great Southern Football League =

Great Southern Football League may refer to:

- Great Southern Football League (South Australia)
- Great Southern Football League (Western Australia)

== See also ==
- Southern Football League (disambiguation)
