= Southside High School =

Southside High School or South Side High School may refer to:

- Southside High School (Gadsden, Alabama)
- Southside High School (Dallas County, Alabama), a school in the Dallas County Schools system
- Southside High School (Batesville, Arkansas)
- South Side High School (Bee Branch, Arkansas)
- Southside High School (Fort Smith, Arkansas)
- South Side High School (Fort Wayne, Indiana)
- Southside High School (Muncie, Indiana)
- Southside High School (Louisiana), Youngsville, Louisiana
- Malcolm X Shabazz High School or South Side High School, Newark, New Jersey
- Southside High School (Elmira, New York)
- South Side High School (Rockville Centre, New York)
- Southside High School (North Carolina), Chocowinity, North Carolina
- South Side High School (Hookstown, Pennsylvania)
- South Side High School (Pittsburgh, Pennsylvania)
- Southside High School (Greenville, South Carolina)
- South Side High School (Jackson, Tennessee)
- South Side High School (Memphis, Tennessee)
- Southside High School (Texas), San Antonio, Texas

== See also ==
- South High School (disambiguation)
