= Northerner =

Northerner may refer to:

- A person from a Northern Region from a State, Province, or Country; For Example:
  - Someone from Northern England
  - Someone from Northern Nigeria
  - Someone from the Northern United States
  - Someone from the Northern District of Israel
  - Someone from the Northern Territory of Australia
- Translation of Beifangren "北方人", endonym for someone from North China
- Northerner (train), in New Zealand
- Northerner (schooner), a shipwreck in Lake Michigan
- The Northerner, Fort St. John, British Columbia weekly newspaper
- The Northerner (student newspaper), weekly student newspaper at Northern Kentucky University
- The Northerner, composer Jeremy Soule's first symphony
- Northerner (Ghana), natives of the three northernmost administrative Regions of Ghana
- Northerners (Korean political faction) of Joseon Period in Korea, resulting from a split in 1590 of the Easterners political faction
