= South (surname) =

South is an English surname. Notable people with the surname include:

- George South (born 1962), American professional wrestler
- Harry South (1929–1990), British composer
- Sir James South (1785–1867), British astronomer
- Joe South (1940–2012), American singer-songwriter
- Melanie South (born 1986), British tennis player
- Robert South (1634–1716), English churchman
- Seán South (1929–1957), Irish Republican Army leader
- William South, several people
