= Southern Man =

Southern Man may refer to:

- Nanman or Southern Man, ancient ethnic groups in South China
- Southern man, New Zealand stereotype
- "Southern Man" (song), by Neil Young
- A man from the Southern United States.

== See also ==
- Southerner (disambiguation)
