= USS Southerner =

USS Southerner (1861)
History

United States
- Acquired: 13 August 1861
- Fate: Presumed foundered c. October 1861

General characteristics
- Sail plan: Schooner

USS Southerner was a schooner purchased by the Union Navy to be used as a sunken obstruction in the waterways of the Confederate States of America. She was part of what was called the "stone fleet".

== Service history ==
Southerner – a Chesapeake Bay schooner – was purchased by the Union Navy at Baltimore, Maryland, on 13 August 1861. The vessel was laden with stone and towed to Hampton Roads. On 26 August, she and sister stone schooner Mary and Hetty got underway with Flag Officer Silas Stringham's task force for the assault on Hatteras Inlet, North Carolina. There, she was used as a transport during the reduction of Fort Hatteras and Fort Clark on the 28th and 29th.

She presumably foundered sometime before 11 October 1861.

== See also ==
- Union blockade
