= Southern League =

Southern League may refer to:

== Professional baseball leagues in the United States ==
- Southern League (1964–present), active since 1964
- Southern Association, known as the "Southern League", active from 1901 to 1919
- Southern League (1885–1899), active from 1885 to 1899
- Southern League of Colored Base Ballists, active in 1886
- Negro Southern League (1920–1936)
- Negro Southern League (1945–1951)

== Other ==
- Southern Football League, a semi-professional football league in England currently known as the PitchingIn Southern League
- Southern League (ice hockey), a former top-flight ice hockey league in southern England from 1970 to 1978
- Southern League (1929–31), one of two British speedway leagues from 1929 to 1931
- Southern League (1952–53), a British speedway competition
- Southern Leagues, the various tournaments for association football, cricket, field hockey, in the South Island of New Zealand
  - Southern League (New Zealand), a semi-professional association football league in New Zealand

== See also ==
- Southern Football League (disambiguation)
- League of the South, a white nationalist organization in the southern United States, formerly known as the Southern League
- League of the South (France) (Ligue du Sud), a far right political party in France
- Southern League Ausonia, an Italian political party based in Campania
- Southern Alliance, an association football league in England
