= William South (jockey) =

British jockey

Personal information
- Born: c. 1734
- Died: 13 September 1791
- Occupation: Jockey

Horse racing career
- Sport: Horse racing

Major racing wins
- Major races Epsom Derby (1788)

Significant horses
- Sir Thomas

William South (c. 1734 – 13 September 1791) was a Derby-winning British jockey. At the age of 54, he won the ninth running of the race on the horse Sir Thomas, trained by Frank Neale and owned by George, Prince of Wales, the future George IV.

== Major wins ==
(United Kingdom) Great Britain

- Epsom Derby – Sir Thomas (1788)
