= Sir Thomas (horse) =

British Thoroughbred racehorse

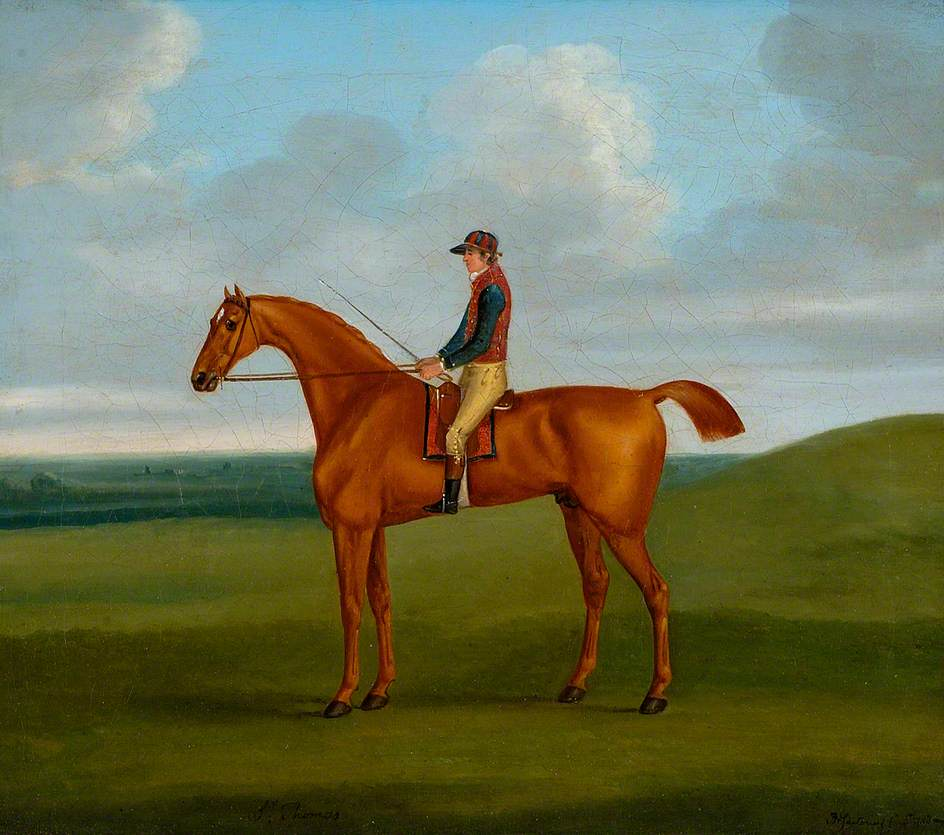
- Sir Thomas, by John Nost Sartorius
- Sire: Pontac
- Grandsire: Marske
- Dam: Sportsmistress
- Damsire: Sportsman
- Sex: Stallion
- Foaled: 1785
- Country: Kingdom of Great Britain
- Colour: Chestnut
- Breeder: Mr. Dawson
- Owner: George, Prince of Wales
- Trainer: Francis Neale
- Record: 13:9-2-1 or 14:10:2-1

Major wins
- Epsom Derby (1788)

Sir Thomas (1785 – after 1790) was a British Thoroughbred racehorse. In a career that lasted from October 1787 to May 1790 he ran thirteen or fourteen times and won nine or ten races. In 1788 he became the first horse owned by a member of the British royal family to win The Derby, having been bought as a two-year-old by the Prince of Wales who later became King George IV. Following his win in the Derby, Sir Thomas raced in the Prince's ownership with some success until 1790.

== Background ==
Sir Thomas was bred by Mr Dawson who owned him for his first race. Sir Thomas's sire Pontac won several races at Newmarket in 1776 and 1777, before retiring to stud. As a stallion he was first based at Richmond in Yorkshire and later moved to Brigg in Lincolnshire. Sir Thomas was the tenth of eleven foals produced by the mare Sportsmistress who had previously produced the successful racehorse and important sire Potoooooooo, by Eclipse.

== Racing career ==
=== 1787: two-year-old season ===
Sir Thomas reportedly won his only start as a two-year-old after which he was bought for 2,000 guineas by the Prince of Wales. This probably took place in 1787, although at this period Thoroughbreds had their official "birthdays" on 1 May and that Sir Thomas would have been described as a "Two-year-old" in the early part of 1788.

=== 1788: three-year-old season ===
Sir Thomas won his first two races of the 1788 season winning the second class of the Prince's Stakes and the Bolton Stakes both at Newmarket.

On 8 May at Epsom, Sir Thomas started the 5/6 favourite in a field of 11 runners for the Derby with Lord Grosvenor's colt Aurelius the second favourite at 5/2. Ridden by William South, Sir Thomas won from Aurelius, with Feenow third.

Sir Thomas is reported to have won 500 guineas and a "compromise" at Newmarket. The first of these was probably the result of a match race against Aurelius which took place at the Houghton meeting in late October or early November.

=== 1789: four-year-old season ===
Sir Thomas reappeared as a four-year-old in the Jockey Stakes over the four-mile Beacon Course at Newmarket on 28 April. Eleven of the thirteen entries were withdrawn and Sir Thomas won at odds of 1/10 from his only remaining opponent, Lord Derby's horse Director. On the following day the Prince collected a 25 guinea forfeit when Lord Grosvenor withdrew his colt by Justice from a match against Sir Thomas. Two days later, Sir Thomas was one of five runners for the Claret Stakes over the Beacon Course. He finished second to the Duke of Bedford's Grey Diomed, the odds on favourite, with Aurelius finishing last. At the next Newmarket meeting on 13 May, Sir Thomas started the 6/4 favourite for the Jockey Club Plate over the Round Course. He finished third of the six runners behind the Duke of Bedford's Cardock.

In late summer, Sir Thomas was sent north for two races at York. On 22 August he started 4/6 favourite for a 100 guinea Sweepstakes and won from Mr Hutchinson's colt by Alfred and three others. Five days later, Sir Thomas ran a 100 guinea match race against Lord Fitzwilliam's Snip. Carrying sixteen pounds more than his opponent, he won the one mile race at odds of 1/2.

During 1789 he was reported to have won one other race at Newmarket with a prize of 140 guineas.

=== 1790: five-year-old season ===
Sir Thomas had four engagements at Newmarket in the spring of 1790. On 19 April he was defeated in a 500 guinea match race against Mr Wentworth's horse Gustavus. Three days later he ran in a subscription race over the Round Course which he won by beating the favourite Cardock. On 7 May the Prince received a forfeit when Mr Wilson withdrew his horse Seedling from a three-mile match against the Derby winner. Sir Thomas's final appearance came on 10 May when he ran in a 50 guinea Sweepstakes "from the end of the Rowley Mile to the end of the Beacon Corse". He finished fourth of the five runners behind Mr Dawson's horse Coriander.

== Stud career ==
Nothing is recorded of Sir Thomas after his races at Newmarket in the spring of 1790. He does not appear in any list of stallions and had no foals recorded in the General Stud Book.

== Pedigree ==
Pedigree of Sir Thomas (GB), chestnut stallion, 1785
Sire Pontac (GB) 1772	Marske; 1750	Squirt	Bartlett's Childers
Sire Pontac (GB) 1772	Marske; 1750	Squirt	sister to Old Country Wench
Sire Pontac (GB) 1772	Marske; 1750	The Ruby Mare	Hutton's Blacklegs
Sire Pontac (GB) 1772	Marske; 1750	The Ruby Mare	Bay Bolton mare
Sire Pontac (GB) 1772	A-La-Grecque; 1763	Regulus	Godolphin Arabian*
Sire Pontac (GB) 1772	A-La-Grecque; 1763	Regulus	Grey Robinson
Sire Pontac (GB) 1772	A-La-Grecque; 1763	Allworthy mare	Allworthy
Sire Pontac (GB) 1772	A-La-Grecque; 1763	Allworthy mare	Starling mare
Dam Sportsmistress (GB) 1765	Sportsman; 1753	Cade	Godolphin Arabian*
Dam Sportsmistress (GB) 1765	Sportsman; 1753	Cade	Roxana
Dam Sportsmistress (GB) 1765	Sportsman; 1753	Silvertail	Heneage's Whitenose
Dam Sportsmistress (GB) 1765	Sportsman; 1753	Silvertail	Rattle mare
Dam Sportsmistress (GB) 1765	Golden Locks; 1758	Oroonoko	Crab*
Dam Sportsmistress (GB) 1765	Golden Locks; 1758	Oroonoko	Miss Slamerkin
Dam Sportsmistress (GB) 1765	Golden Locks; 1758	Crab mare	Crab*
Dam Sportsmistress (GB) 1765	Golden Locks; 1758	Crab mare	Partner mare (Family:38)

* Sire Thomas is inbred 4S × 4D to the stallion Godolphin Arabian, meaning that he appears fourth generation on the sire side of his pedigree, and fourth generation on the dam side of his pedigree.

* Sir Thomas is inbred 4D × 4D to the stallion Crab, meaning that he appears fourth generation twice on the dam side of his pedigree.
