= Sothern =

Sothern is a surname, and may refer to:

- Alan Sothern (born 28 July 1987), Irish field hockey player
- Ann Sothern (1909–2001), American film and television actress born Harriette Arlene Lake
- Denny Sothern (1904–1977), American baseball player
- E. H. Sothern (1859–1933), American actor
- Edward Askew Sothern (1826–1881), English actor
- Georgia Sothern (1913–1981), born Hazel Anderson, burlesque dancer
- Jean Sothern (1893–1964), American actress
- Sara Sothern (1895–1994), American stage actress
- Scot Sothern (born 1949), American photographer

== See also ==
- Southern (disambiguation)
