= Southern High School =

Southern High School may refer to:

- Southern High School (Guam), Santa Rita, Guam
- Southern School of Energy and Sustainability, Durham, South Carolina
- Southern High School, one of the schools that formed West Central High School, Stronghurst, Illinois
- Southern High School (Kentucky), Louisville, Kentucky
- Southern High School (Harwood, Maryland)
- Southern High School (Missouri), Ellington, Missouri
- Southern High School (Racine, Ohio)
- Southern High School (Baltimore, Maryland), a former secondary school
  - Replaced by Digital Harbor High School
- Southern Local Junior/Senior High School, Salineville, Ohio
- Southern Regional High School, Manahawkin, New Jersey

== See also ==
- South High School (disambiguation)
