= Southern Regional =

Southern Regional can refer to the following things:

- Southern Regional Education Board, a nonprofit education association based in Atlanta, Georgia
- Southern Regional College, a college in Northern Ireland
- Southern Regional Council, a civil-rights organization located in Atlanta, Georgia
- Southern Regional School District, a school district located in Manahawkin, New Jersey
  - Southern Regional High School, a high school located in the aforementioned district
- Southern Regional Testing Agency, and examination agency for dentistry in the United States
