= Northerner (shipwreck) =

Shipwreck in Lake Michigan

History

United States
- Name: Northerner
- Operator: Russell Disbrow; Andreas Ryerson; (see footnote 1)
- Builder: John Oades
- Completed: 1850
- Fate: Sank 29 November 1868

General characteristics
- Class & type: Schooner
- Length: 81 ft (25 m)
- Beam: 18.9 ft (5.8 m)
- Northerner
- U.S. National Register of Historic Places
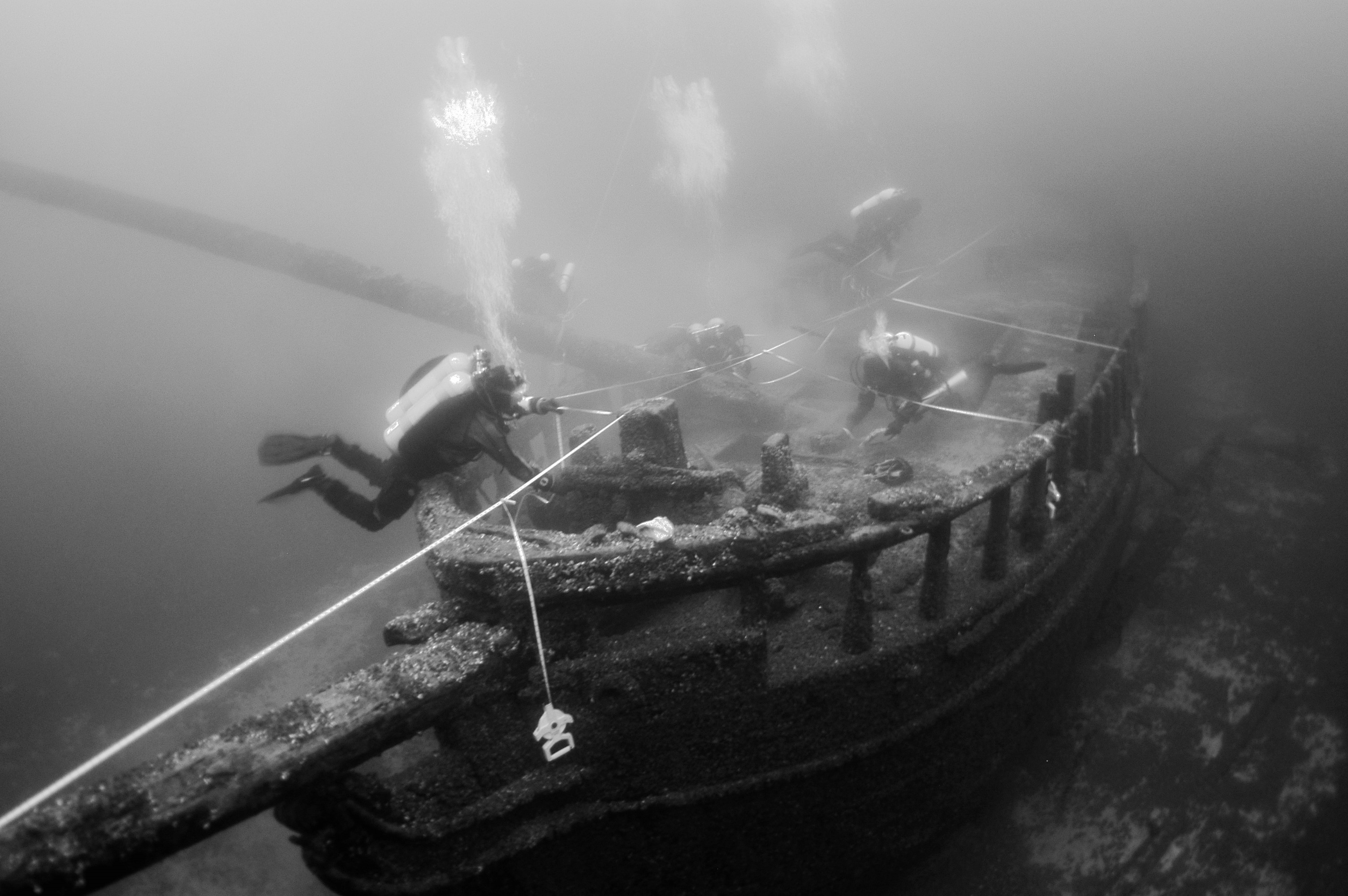
- Location: One mile off Port Washington, Wisconsin
- Coordinates: 43°18′53″N 87°49′27″W
- Built: 1850
- MPS: Great Lakes Shipwreck Sites of Wisconsin MPS
- NRHP reference No.: 10001005
- Added to NRHP: December 10, 2010

Northerner was an 81-foot-long (24.7-meter-long), two-masted schooner. She sank in Lake Michigan on November 29, 1868, five miles east of Grafton, Wisconsin, United States. The bottom of the ship lies under 130 feet (40 meters) of water.

== Career ==
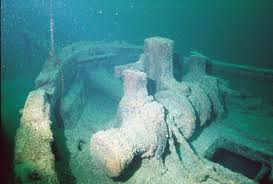
The windlass of the Northerner

Northerner was built in 1850 in Clayton, New York, by John Oades. Her original owner was Henry T. Bacon, a New York merchant, and her co-owner and operator was Russell Disbrow. At that time, Northerner mainly operated on Lake Ontario and the St. Lawrence River. In 1859, she was damaged in a storm on Lake Ontario and was reconstructed at Wells Island, New York. In 1863, the ship was sold to interests in Chicago, Illinois. At that point, Northerner became involved in shipping lumber on Lake Michigan. On 15 September 1865, Northerner was sold to Nicholas Ronk and Nicholas Cauten of Ronksville, Wisconsin. By 7 December 1866 Ronk bought out his partner and became the Northerner's sole owner. On 22 May 1867 a new enrollment was entered at Milwaukee that documented Anders Ryerson of Milwaukee as owning 1/3 share and Nicholas Ronk owning 2/3 of the vessel. Ryerson became her captain. In November 1868, her hull suffered damaged at Cedar Grove, Wisconsin, while she took on a cargo of timber. The ship made it to Port Washington, where temporary repairs were made. Then she was towed back to Milwaukee, Wisconsin, by another ship, Cuyahoga. Northerner capsized en route to Milwaukee on November 29, 1868. Cuyahoga rescued her crew.

== The wreck ==
The depth of Northerner′s is somewhat controversial. Some sources cite the Northerner as being under 130 feet (40 meters) of water, while others have stated that the depth is 135 feet (41 meters). The foremast has toppled but remains on the wreck. The amidships mast is no longer on or near the wreck. The ship remains fairly intact although the pilothouse tore off when the ship sank.

== Footnotes ==
- 1) This listing of operators in most likely incomplete. The resources used only mentions these operators and further research should be done for a complete listing.
