= Graveworm discography =

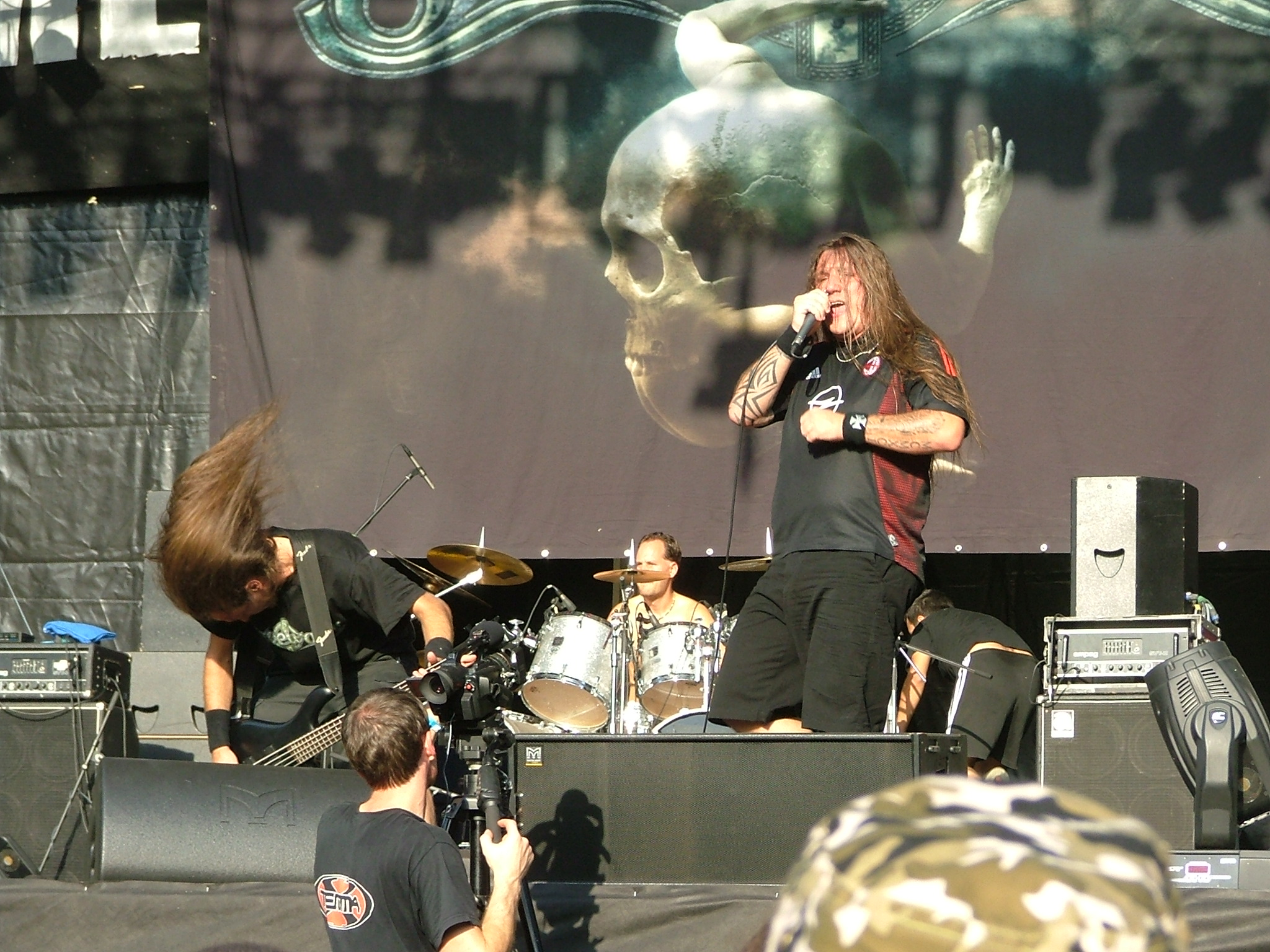
- Graveworm performing in 2007
- Studio albums: 9
- Extended plays: 2
- Compilation albums: 1
- Video albums: 1
- Music videos: 2
- Demo albums: 1

The discography of Graveworm, a dark metal band from South Tyrol, consists of one demo album, two extended plays, nine studio albums, one video album and one compilation album.

Graveworm signed with Serenades records in 1997 before recording any material. They then released their demo, their first extended play and studio album, Eternal Winds and When Daylight's Gone, in the same year followed by their second extended play and their first video album, Underneath the Crescent Moon and Awaiting the Shining, the year after. Towards the end of 1999 they released their second studio album As the Angels Reach the Beauty and then their third studio album Scourge of Malice (2001), alongside the joint re-release of When Daylight's Gone and Underneath The Crescent Moon later that year before singing to Nuclear Blast records. Their first release under Nuclear Blast was Engraved in Black (2003), their fourth studio album. Two years later they released their fifth studio album, (N)utopia, their sixth studio album, Collateral Defect (2007), their seventh studio album Diabolical Figures (2009), their eighth studio album Fragments Of Death (2011) and their most recent studio album Ascending Hate (2015).

== Studio albums ==
Year	Title
1997	When Daylight's Gone: Released: 6 October 1997; Label: Serenades Records (#SR 010)
1999	As the Angels Reach the Beauty: Released: 26 September 1999; Label: Serenades Records (#SR 027)
2001	Scourge of Malice: Released: 31 July 2001; Label: Serenades Records (#SR 031)
2003	Engraved in Black: Released: 23 June 2003; Label: Nuclear Blast (#NB 1042-2)
2005	(N)utopia: Released: 5 April 2005; Label: Nuclear Blast (#NB 1365-0)
2007	Collateral Defect: Released: 5 June 2007; Label: Massacre Records/Nuclear Blast (#NB 1880)
2009	Diabolical Figures: Released: 16 June 2009; Label: Massacre Records
2011	Fragments of Death: Released: 14 October 2011; Label: Nuclear Blast
2015	Ascending Hate: Released: 19 June 2015; Label: Nuclear Blast

== Compilations ==
Year	Title
2001	When Daylight's Gone & Underneath the Crescent Moon: Released: 24 September 2001; Label: Last Episode

== Demos and extended plays ==
Year	Title	Track listing
1997	Demo '97: Label: Serenades Records	1. "Tears from My Eyes"; 2. "Eternal Winds"; 3. "Lost Yourself"; 4. "When the Sky Turns Black"
1997	Eternal Winds: Label: Serenades Records	1. "Tears from My Eyes" – 4:12; 2. "Eternal Winds" – 5:12
1998	Underneath the Crescent Moon: Released: 24 April 1998; Label: Serenades Records (#SR 018)	1. "Awaiting the Shining" – 3:52; 2. "Awake… Thy Angels of Sorrow" – 5:03; 3. "By the Grace of God" – 4:55; 4. "How Many Tears" – 6:05

== Videos ==
Year	Title
1998	Awaiting the Shining: Label: Serenades Records

== Music videos ==
Year	Title	Director
1998	"Awaiting the Shining"	Unknown
2005	"I – The Machine"	Bernhard Kellerer
2011	"See No Future"	Unknown
