= The Little Match Girl =

1845 fairy tale by Hans Christian Andersen

- Short story by Hans Christian Andersen
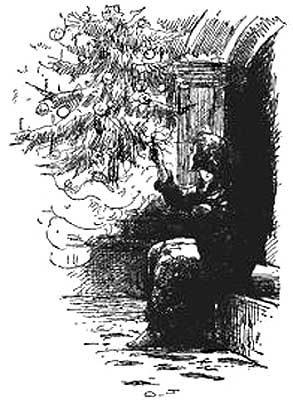
- A. J. Bayes illustration, 1889
- Original title: Den Lille Pige med Svovlstikkerne
- Country: Denmark
- Language: Danish
- Genre: Literary fairy tale

Publication
- Published in: Dansk Folkekalender for 1846
- Publication date: December 1845

"The Little Match Girl" (Danish: Den Lille Pige med Svovlstikkerne, meaning "The little girl with the matchsticks") is a literary fairy tale by Danish poet and author Hans Christian Andersen. The story, about a dying child's dreams and hope, was first published in 1845. It has been adapted to various media, including animated, live-action, and VR films as well as television musicals and opera.

== Summary ==
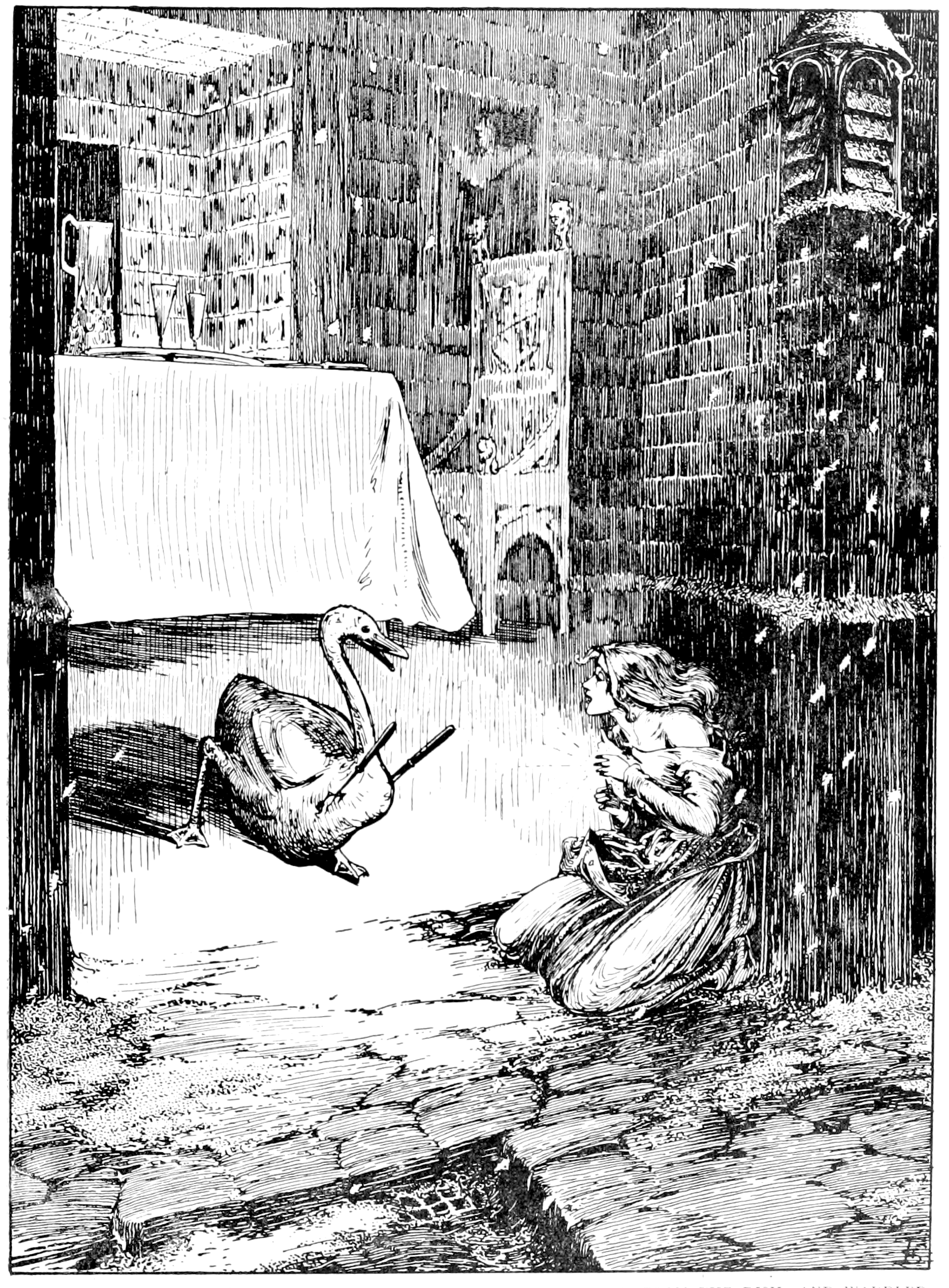
Helen Stratton illustration, 1899

On a freezing New Year's Eve, a poor young girl, shivering, bareheaded, and barefoot, unsuccessfully tries to sell matches in the street. Afraid to go home because her father would beat her for failing to sell any matches and not earning a single penny, she huddles in the alley between two houses and lights matches, one by one, to warm herself.

In the flame of the matches, she sees a series of comforting visions: an iron stove, a roasted goose, a loving family, and a Christmas tree. Each vision disappears as its match burns out. In the sky, she sees a shooting star, which her late grandmother had told her meant that someone is on their way to Heaven. In the flame of the next match she sees her grandmother, the only person who had ever treated her with kindness. To keep the vision of her grandmother alive as long as possible, the girl lights the entire bundle of matches she has.

When the matches are gone, the girl freezes to death in the cold weather, as her grandmother carries her soul to Heaven. The next morning, passers-by find the girl's body with a smile on her face and express pity, but they do not know about the wonderful visions she had seen or how happy she is with her grandmother in Heaven.

== Publication ==
"The Little Match Girl" was first published in December 1845, in Dansk Folkekalender for 1846. The work was re-published as a part of New Fairy Tales (4 March 1848), Second Volume, Second Collection (Nye Eventyr (1848), Andet Bind, Anden Samling), and again 18 December 1849 as a part of Fairy Tales (1850; Eventyr). The work was also published 30 March 1863 as a part of Fairy Tales and Stories (1863), Second Volume (Eventyr og Historier (1863), Andet Bind).

== Adaptations ==
=== Amusement park attractions ===
- The Fairy Tale Forest (Dutch: Sprookjesbos) of the amusement park Efteling in the Netherlands has a three-dimensional attraction showing the story of the Little Match Girl, called Dutch: Het Meisje met de Zwavelstokjes. In this attraction, use is made of the Pepper's ghost technique.

=== Anime and manga ===
- The 52nd and final episode of Andersen Monogatari (1971) is based on the story.
- In the episode 307 of Crayon Shin-chan, "Nene-chan is the Tragedy Heroine" (1999), the story inspires Nene-chan to play the Cinderella game with her friends.
- In Hello Kitty's Animation Theater an episode is an adaptation of this tale, complete with its grim ending.
- In Is the Order a Rabbit?, Sharo starts daydreaming while handing out flyers, humorously seeing it as a death flag when she connects her actions to the match girl.
- Chapter 18 of the manga series Binbou Shimai Monogatari (2004) replays the tale of "The Little Match Girl", featuring the protagonists Asu and Kyou with a happy ending twist.
- In Chapter 24 (Volume 3) of Love Hina, Su makes Shinobu dress up as a Little Red Riding Hood-type and sell matches to raise some travelling money to Okinawa. When that plot initially fails and Shinobu starts to cry, a good number of passers-by are moved to tears and prepare to buy all her matches until the two girls are chased off by resident yakuza.
- In the Japanese anime Gakuen Alice, the main character, Mikan Sakura, puts on a play about the Little Match Girl to earn money.
- Episode 201 of Gintama, "Everybody's a Santa", parodies "The Little Match Girl", where Yagyu Kyubei narrates a humorous retelling of the story, featuring Kagura as the eponymous title character, replacing matchsticks with shinpachi, a human punching bag.
- "Girl Who Doesn't Sell Matches But is Misfortunate Anyway" is the final episode of the 2010 anime series Ōkami-san, which draws inspiration from various fairy tales. The episode features a character called Machiko Himura, who is based on the Little Match Girl.
- "The Little Key Frames Girl", episode 11 of the anime Shirobako (2014), humorously replays the whole match girl story from a more modern and lower stakes point of view.
- In "Christmas Osomatsu-san", episode 11 of the anime Osomatsu-san (2015), Iyami humorously acts as the Little Match Girl, dying in the end.
- Match Shoujo, a manga by Sanami Suzuki (2014–15), is being made into a live-action film starring Sumire Sato as the title character.
- In "Let's Get Wiggy With It", episode 2 of the anime Bobobo-bo Bo-bobo (2003–2005), Don Patch humorously recites a story of him selling churros at Christmas time with no one buying, showing a churro buried and covered in snow in the end, resembling death.
- In "Troupe Dragon, On Stage! (They Had a Troupe Name, Huh)", episode 10 of the anime Miss Kobayashi's Dragon Maid (2017), the main characters decide to stage a performance of "The Little Match Girl" for a nursing home on Christmas. Throughout the episode, the characters add their own ideas to the story (such as magical girls and the forty-seven rōnin), to the point that the performance bears virtually no resemblance to the original.
- In YuruYuri Season 3 episode 10, Akari and Kyoko light matches to keep themselves warm when the Kotatsu does not work. They see visions of shaved ice and a turkey dinner. They both survive however.
- The cover art for chapter 43 (vol. 3) of Komi Can't Communicate features Komi-san dressed up as the Little Match Girl in a snowy street holding a lit match.
- One Piece cover story from chapter 247 shows former king Wapol, at that point a beggar, selling matches in a snowy street with the subtitles "I'm the little match girl".
- In Isekai Quartet season 2 episode 11 "It Begins! School Festival", Yunyun (a recurring character originally from KonoSuba whose running joke is that she is always alone) acts out a play version of the story solo.
- In the Flint the Time Detective episode "Nightcap", the main characters visit Hans Christian Andersen who is trapped in his own dreams by the Time Shifter Nightcap and having his own creations acting oddly. Among them, the Little Match Girl is selling watches instead of matches. She and the other creations later help to break Flint and Talen-Master out of Petra Fina and Super Ninja's evil spell.
- In episode 7 of the Nekopara OVA, the catgirls recount various fairy tales. Among them, is a retelling of "The Little Match Girl" by Maple – starring Cinnamon as the titular character – which is restructured in parodic fashion. Namely, Cinnamon visualizes sensual fantasies rather than the idyllic visions found in the original telling.
- In season 4 episode 6 of Date A Live, while in the fairy tale world Kotori is based on the Little Match Girl.

=== Audio recordings ===
- Danny Kaye reads "The Match Girl" on Side B of Hans Christian Andersen's Fairy Tales (Golden Records, 1962), later re-issued on CD as part of Danny Kaye Re-tells Grimm's & Hans Christian Andersen's Fairy Tales (Golden Records, 2008)
- The record "Charles Dickens: A Christmas Carol" published by Peter Pan Records features a reading on the B side.

=== Comics ===
- In issue #112 of Bill Willingham's Fables (a comic book series about living embodiments of storybook characters), the Little Match Girl is introduced to Rose Red as one of the paladins of the embodiment of Hope, ostensibly on the night that the girl is doomed to die (Christmas Eve, in this telling). The child identifies herself as "the caretaker of hope deferred", braving the deadly cold and saving the meager pennies she earns towards the promise of a better life in the future, and stubbornly denying that her death is close at hand.

=== Films ===
==== 16mm short subject films ====
- In 1954, Castle Films released a 16 mm English-language version of a 1952 black-and-white French short live-action film. Instead of her grandmother, the Virgin Mary, whom the match girl believes is her own long-lost mother, takes the girl to Heaven. No mention is made of the father beating the child.

==== Animated films ====
- The Little Match Girl (1937), one of the Color Rhapsodies, a Charles Mintz studio color cartoon adaptation set in 1930s New York City, directed by Arthur Davis and Sid Marcus, and considered among the studio's best films. It was nominated for the 1937 Academy Award for Best Short Subject (Cartoons), though it lost to Disney's short The Old Mill. This version of the story is slightly different from Andersen's story, specifically near the end.
- Hans Christian Andersen no Sekai (1971, The World of Hans Christian Andersen), is an animated film by Toei Animation based on Andersen's works.
- In the 1978 animated adaptation of The Stingiest Man in Town, the character Ebenezer Scrooge is seen passing by a caricature of the little match girl.
- The Little Match Girl (2006), the last of four Walt Disney Animation Studios shorts originally intended to be part of a Fantasia (2006) compilation film, which was canceled. This short was then developed as a stand-alone film and was nominated for the 2006 Academy Award for Best Animated Short, losing to "The Danish Poet". This short was subsequently released as a special feature on the 2006 Platinum Edition DVD of The Little Mermaid (1989). In 2015, the short was released on the Walt Disney Animation Studios Short Films Collection Blu-ray Disc and is now streaming on Disney+.
- Emily the Little Match Girl (2021), directed by Matthew Hickinbottom, is a CGI film based on the Andersen story released in the UK on 29 November 2021, with the voices of David Bradley as Harry the Match Maker, Lesley Joseph as Grandma, Lisa Armytage as the Narrator and Megan Sadler as the title character.

==== Live-action films ====
- The Little Match Seller (1902) is a short silent film directed by James Williamson
- The Little Match Girl (1914) is a 9 minute long silent film directed by Percy Nash.
- The Little Match Girl (French: La Petite Marchande d'Allumettes) (1928) is a 40-minute silent film by Jean Renoir.
- La Jeune Fille aux Allumettes (1952), French director Jean Benoît-Lévy's film version, includes a brief dance sequence with ballet star Janine Charrat.
- Den lille pige med svovlstikkerne (1953) is an adaptation by Danish film director Johan Jacobsen as a short film, starring Karin Nellemose, Françoise Rosay, and Agnes Thorberg Wieth. The film competed for the short film prize of the 1954 Cannes Film Festival.
- Little Rose Selling Girl (Spanish: La vendedora de rosas) (1998), directed by Víctor Gaviria, is a Colombian film about homeless children victims of solvent abuse, loosely based on "The Little Match Girl"; it competed for the Palme d'Or at the 1998 Cannes Film Festival.
- Resurrection of the Little Match Girl (2003) is a Korean film.
- Match Shojo (2016) is a Japanese adaptation of Sanami Suzuki's manga starring Sumire Sato.

=== Games ===
- Suikoden III (2002), a video game for the PlayStation 2, contains a highly abridged play version of "The Little Match Girl". In the game, the player can cast characters in different roles and have them perform a shortened version of the story.
- Yakuza 5 (2012), a video game for the PlayStation 3, has a substory named "The Little Match Girl" during Taiga Saejima's segment of the game that involves a little girl selling matches for 100 yen. A similar substory also appears in Yakuza (2005) and its remake, Yakuza Kiwami (2016).
- In The Witcher 3: Wild Hunt – Blood and Wine, the "Girl Who Sells Flint", tired of seeing that no one buys her flint, starts selling tobacco, various alcoholic beverages and even drugs, stating that "it is much more profitable and demand is high".
- THE iDOLM@STER 2 (2011), a video game for Xbox 360 and PlayStation 3, has a song titled "Little Match Girl" available in the first DLC pack for the Xbox 360 version and available by default in the PlayStation 3 version. The song features a romanticized version of the story. The song has made further appearances in THE iDOLM@STER SHINY FESTA, THE iDOLM@STER ONE FOR ALL, and in the 2011 anime adaptation of the series.
- Dark Parables: The Match Girl`s Lost Paradise (2018) is the fifteenth installment of the Dark Parables franchise. The story involves unexplained fires known as The Flame of Illusion occurring in Stars Hollow. The recent one involved a rich landowner who was caught in his own home, leaving no traces of bodies or fires anywhere. A young girl selling matches is the only solid clue. The player, the Fairytale Detective, must stop these fires and the Match Girl.
- Lobotomy Corporation (2018) contains a character called the "Scorched Girl" who appears to be an apparition with a match stuck through her torso. The game explains that she is a reference to the Hans Christian Andersen fable. She also appears in Lobotomy Corporation's sequel, Library of Ruina (2021).
- She appears as a playable character in the 2017 mobile game SINoALICE.

=== Literature ===
- Anne Bishop published the short story "Match Girl" in Ruby Slippers, Golden Tears (1995).
- On page 319 of Clarissa Pinkola Estés' book Women Who Run with the Wolves (1992), "The Little Match Girl", the author tells the story to her aunt, followed by a lucid analysis.
- In Neil Gaiman's novella A Study in Emerald (2004), the main characters view a set of three plays, one of which is a stage adaptation of the "Little Match Girl".
- Novelist Gregory Maguire read a short story based on "The Little Match Girl" over the air on NPR. He later expanded the short story into a novel, published as Matchless: A Christmas Story (2009).
- William McGonagall retold "The Little Match Girl" in a poem.
- Jerry Pinkney wrote an adaption of the story setting it in the early twentieth century.
- Terry Pratchett's Discworld novel Hogfather (1996) gives the story a less morbid ending, thanks to the intervention of Death himself: The story begins as normal but observed and commentated on by Death currently acting as the Hogfather (the Discworld equivalent of Santa Claus) and his manservant Albert. When Death takes issue with the events transpiring Albert notes that the tale of the little match girl is meant to remind people that they could be worse off even when completely penniless. Death chooses not to accept this and to instead extend the girl's life, bending the rules of his job using the fact that he is filling in for the Hogfather who gives gifts and there could be no better gift then a future.
- Hans Tseng adapted "The Little Match Girl" into a short story manga, featured in the first volume of Tokyopop's Rising Stars of Manga (2003).
- In Anne Ursu's novel Breadcrumbs (2011), the main character Hazel meets in the woods a character based on the Little Match Girl.
- Yiyun Li's short story "A Small Flame", first published in The New Yorker in 2017, makes extensive reference to "The Little Match Girl".

=== Music ===
- In 1994, Frederik Magle released the album The Song Is a Fairytale, of songs based on Hans Christian Andersen's fairytales, with Thomas Eje and Niels-Henning Ørsted Pedersen amongst others. "The Little Match Girl" is one of the songs.
- In 1988–1996, the German avant-garde composer Helmut Lachenmann wrote an opera based on the story, called Das Mädchen mit den Schwefelhölzern, also including a text by Red Army Faction founder Gudrun Ensslin.
- In 1995, German singer Meret Becker included the song "Das Mädchen mit den Schwefelhölzern" in her album Noctambule.
- In 1996, Taiwanese singer Chyi Chin included the song "Matchstick Heaven" (火柴天堂) in his album. The song was based on the story and was composed by Taiwanese singer/songwriter Panda Hsiung.
- In 2001, guitarist Loren Mazzacane Connors released the album The Little Match Girl based on the story.
- In 2001, the Hungarian band Tormentor wrote the song "The Little Match Girl", with lyrics based on the story.
- In 2002, GrooveLily released the album Striking 12, a musical based on "The Little Match Girl", which subsequently opened off-Broadway in 2006.
- The music video for Erasure's song "Breathe" (2005) is a modern adaptation of the story.
- In 2006, the English band The Tiger Lillies and a string trio released the album The Little Match Girl based on the story. -->
- American composer David Lang completed his own rendition of the original story in 2007. The Little Match Girl Passion is scored for four solo voices, soprano, alto, tenor and bass, with percussion, and was written for Paul Hillier and his ensemble Theater of Voices. The work was awarded the Pulitzer Prize in music in 2008. It presents Hans Christian Andersen's tale in Lang's characteristic post-minimalist style with thematic influence from Johann Sebastian Bach's St. John and St. Matthew Passions.
- In 2012, The Crüxshadows recorded the song "Matchstick Girl" on their album As the Dark Against My Halo, which according to the band's frontman, Rogue, refers to Hans Christian Andersen's fairy tale.
- Tori Amos's 2015 musical The Light Princess includes the song "My Fairy-Story", where the main character reads this story and compares it to her own situation.
- In 2015, Japanese techno-rap unit Wednesday Campanella produced the song "Match Uri no Shōjo" (「マッチ売りの少女」, 'The Little Match Girl').
- In 2016, Mack Wilberg wrote a rendition of the original story for narrator, choir, and orchestra, with lyrics by David Warner. It was first performed during the 2016 Christmas Concert of The Tabernacle Choir at Temple Square, with Rolando Villazon as the narrator.
- The music video for Loona's song "Heart Attack" (2008) is an adaptation of the story.
- In 2021, Chengdu-based rapper MaSiWei released "Little Match Girl" (卖火柴的小女孩), which alludes to this story.
- In November 2023, StarKid Productions and composer Clark Baxtresser's musical VHS Christmas Carols premiered live at the Apollo Theater in Chicago, featuring a segment based on The Little Match Girl. Originally a 2020 virtual show based solely on Charles Dickens' A Christmas Carol that would receive a live run and recording in 2021, a first act was added in 2023 to adapt Match Girl in addition to O. Henry's The Gift of the Magi.

=== Television ===
- In 1974, a contemporarized version set in Cincinnati on Christmas Eve was aired on WLWT. This Christmas special was placed in syndication and last aired on the CBN Cable Network in December 1982. It is notable for featuring a 9 year old Sarah Jessica Parker.
- In 1986, HTV released The Little Match Girl as a musical based on the original story. The cast included Twiggy and Roger Daltrey. It included the song "Mistletoe and Wine", which became a Christmas hit in the UK two years later for Cliff Richard.
- The Little Match Girl (1987) is an NBC television film directed by Michael Lindsay-Hogg, and starring Keshia Knight Pulliam, William Daniels, John Rhys-Davies, and Rue McClanahan. The film received a mixed reception from critics.
- In 1990, a modernized version set to original music and narrated by F. Murray Abraham was presented by HBO Storybook Musicals, in which the girl is the daughter of a homeless New York couple forced to live underground in an abandoned subway station due to the economic collapse of the 1990s.
- Uwe Janson directed an adaptation titled Das Mädchen mit den Schwefelhölzern (2013) in 2013.

== See also ==
- A Dog of Flanders, a similar novel by Ouida
- List of works by Hans Christian Andersen
- Near death experience
- Vilhelm Pedersen, the first illustrator of Andersen's fairy tales
- "To Build a Fire", two versions of a short story by Jack London about an adult who suffers from hypothermia in the Yukon Territory
- "The Beggar Boy at Christ's Christmas Tree", a similar short story by Fyodor Dostoevsky
- Child labour
