= Dark Kingdom: The Dragon King =

- DVD cover
- Written by: Diane Duane; Peter Morwood; Uli Edel
- Directed by: Uli Edel
- Starring: Kristanna Loken; Benno Fürmann; Alicia Witt; Max von Sydow
- Theme music composer: Ilan Eshkeri
- Country of origin: Germany
- Original languages: German; English
- No. of episodes: 2

Production
- Producers: Rola Bauer; Andreas Schmid; Konstantin Thoeren
- Cinematography: Elemér Ragályi
- Editor: Roberto Silvi
- Running time: 222 minutes (TV film); 162 minutes (UK)
- Production companies: Tandem Productions; VIP Medienfonds 2; VIP Medienfonds 3

Original release
- Network: Sat.1
- Release: 29 November – 30 November 2004

Dark Kingdom: The Dragon King (also known, in different cuts, formats and markets, as Ring of the Nibelungs, Die Nibelungen, Curse of the Ring and Sword of Xanten) is a 2004 German television film directed by Uli Edel and starring Kristanna Loken, Benno Fürmann, Alicia Witt and Max von Sydow. The film is based on the Norse mythology story Völsungasaga and the German epic poem Nibelungenlied, which tells the mythological story of Siegfried the Dragon-Slayer. Richard Wagner's music dramas Siegfried and Götterdämmerung are based on the same material. Dark Kingdom:The Dragon King was written by the husband and wife team of Diane Duane and Peter Morwood and is a Tandem Communications production. It was filmed entirely in South Africa.

Dark Kingdom: The Dragon King had a theatrical release in the United Kingdom on 19 November 2004. The German-language version, Die Nibelungen, was shown on the German television channel Sat.1 on 29 and 30 November 2004. It was the highest-rated mini-series on German television that year. On 23 December 2005 Channel 4 showed the entire series in one evening under the title Sword of Xanten, describing it as a "megafeature". It was shown on the SciFi Channel on 27 March 2006, retitled Dark Kingdom: The Dragon King for the United States audience and minus about one hour of material.

== Plot ==
The film is set around the time when many Europeans had changed their religion from paganism to Christianity. The film is split into three parts, and comprises the story of Siegfried from childhood to his death.

Part 1

Siegfried awakens in the middle of an invasion of his parents' castle by Saxons. The castle is soon overrun and all are slain except for Siegfried, whose mother has sent him down the river. In the morning he has lost his memory and is picked up by a blacksmith, Eyvind, who raises him under the name Eric.

Twelve years later, Brunhild, the Queen of Iceland (still a pagan like Eyvind and Eric) follows her adviser's runes that lead her to where Eric lives. The runes foretell that a star will fall from the sky and from its smoke a man will appear who will defeat her. Brunhild initially has doubts as no one has ever beaten her in a fight before. That night a meteor, a described announcement to a war between the gods called Ragnarök, hits the earth near the smithy and despite Eyvind's warning, Eric goes to investigate. In the middle of the crater there are two rocks of a strange kind of metal. Wearing a cloak over her face, Brunhild arrives and Eric, believing she is a Saxon, attacks her. After a short battle he defeats her, and they instantly fall in love with each other, seeing their gathering as the will of the gods. After making love, Eric promises to go to Iceland to meet Brunhild and they fall asleep. In the morning Eric wakes up alone after Brunhild has taken one of the rocks and left. Eric convinces Eyvind to let him go with him to Burgund (the kingdom of the Burgundians) and on their way down the river they see a town in flames.

Once in Burgund the hawk Arminius, belonging to King Gunther's brother Giselher, lands on Eric's arm and there is a brief fight between Eric and some of the townspeople. Afterwards Eyvind presents his swords to Gunther, who reveals that the dragon Fafnir has awakened and is responsible for the burnt village. King Gunther and his best men, including army chief Hagen, leave to slay the dragon; Giselher befriends Eric and says that his sister Kriemhild is wanted by every man in the kingdom but she doesn't want any of them. Eyvind leaves Eric to use the rock from the meteor to make a sword.

Gunther returns injured with Hagen; all the other knights have been killed. Eric promises to Kriemhild that Gunther and his men will be avenged. He enters Fafnir's lair and, after a fierce battle, manages to slay the dragon while receiving only a scratch on his arm. Seeing that Fafnir's blood has healed his scratch, Eric bathes in the blood, rendering his skin invulnerable (save for a single spot where an errant leaf had fallen upon his upper back, leaving that one spot untouched by the blood).

Part 2

Eric explores the cave and finds a vast hall filled with treasure. He finds a ring, the Ring of the Nibelung, and is then confronted by ghosts of immortal twilight beings, the Nibelungs. They warn him that taking any of their treasure will bring a curse down on him, but he does not listen and takes the ring and promises to come back for the rest. Outside he is attacked by an ex-Nibelung who lost his immortality for trying to take all the treasure, who happens to be Hagen's father Alberich. Eric soon defeats Alberich and takes his Tarnhelm, an item that lets him take the shape of anyone else. The Nibelungs tell Siegfried again to return the treasure, and when Siegfried offers to return half to them they say it will not be sufficient. Eric returns to Burgund with Fafnir's head and shows it to the people; Gunther proclaims he is a hero, which makes Hagen jealous.

That night, Eric dances and spends the evening with Kriemhild, who wears a mask during the party, and tells her he is already in love with another woman (Brunhild). Meanwhile, the entire dragon's hoard is moved to the Burgund treasury and fills it near to overflowing. The Saxons suddenly decide to invade Burgund to take the gold and Eric rides with the army to confront the twin Saxon kings, the men who slew his father. During a short fight Eric remembers who he is, then he declares the kingdom to be split between himself and King Gunther. He sadly remembers his father's death, giving the two Saxons the choice to leave, but they attack again and are slain.

It is also at this point that Eyvind (who tells Eric that he suspected his origin from the beginning) passes away from old age and Siegfried gives him a proper pagan funeral in his honor. A raven send by Brunhild lands on his arm, and Eric delivers her the message that he is actually Siegfried of Xanten, that he had found his real place and identity, and that he will visit her soon, planning to make her his wife as soon as possible, but warning it may take a little longer because he desires to take his treasure to Xanten for her. Having overheard Eric and Kriemhild at the party, Hagen asks his father to make a potion that Kriemhild gives Eric, causing him to fall in love with her and forget Brunhild. A raven who would deliver this news to Brunhild is then shot down by Hagen.

Part 3

Siegfried, having forgotten about Brunhild, asks to marry Kriemhild, but Hagen reminds Gunther that he must marry before any of his siblings. Gunther reveals he is pining for Brunhild, but he is not the best fighter and she challenges all her suitors to single combat and no-one has beaten her yet. Gunther promises Siegfried that he may marry Kriemhild if he uses the Tarnhelm to look like Gunther and defeat Brunhild; Siegfried accepts this offer. On the ship to Iceland Giselher has stowed away and after support from Siegfried, Gunther lets him accompany them to Iceland. Once they arrive Brunhild is immensely happy that Siegfried has returned to her but is shocked to see that he doesn't recognize her or is challenging her. Siegfried simply presents King Gunther to her, and explains he is the one who came here to ask her hand in marriage. Gunther his then challenged to single combat with double bladed axes on the condition that if he loses it will cost him his life. He agrees partially because it will be Siegfried fighting, not him.

The fight starts and unbeknown to everyone else Giselher sees the two Gunthers and becomes suspicious but tells no one. Brunhild loses the fight after the two fall off a waterfall and Siegfried saves her. She reluctantly and sadly returns to Burgund, where she is devastated to find that Siegfried had found Kriemhild for lover. She then marries Gunther next to Siegfried and Kriemhild, who are also marrying on the same day. Brunhild confronts Siegfried who (due to effects of the potion) claims he never loved her. Brunhild ardently refuses to believe him and tries to find reasons that would explain his actions, but Siegfried once again denies caring for her, and Brunhild declares she will not know joy until she forgets how much she loved him, or until he remembers. She is deeply hurt and upset and she takes her anger out by challenging Siegfried to combat, which he purposely loses to take away any thoughts that it was him who defeated Brunhild. During their wedding night, Brunhild overpowers Gunther, after revealing that the power she possess comes from her pageant belt, and pointing out her doubts in the way Gunther defeated her back in Iceland. Nearly accusing him to have cheated his victory, she leaves him tied up for the night, greatly convinced she had been deceived. Gunther requests Siegfried use the Tarnhelm again to get the belt away from Brunhild, which he does after hesitation. He overpowers Brunhild, who is surprised to see that Gunther once again found his strength. She then offers herself to Siegfried as Gunther, who is briefly conflicted perhaps remembering of his old feelings towards Brunhild, but nonetheless retrieves himself from the room to get rid of the belt he has taken from her.

The real Gunther shortly returns to the room at his place and is spotted by Giselher, who again sees two Gunthers and tells his girlfriend Lena what he saw in Iceland. Siegfried returns to his bedroom to see Kriemhild waiting for him: she convinces him to explain what has happened and he does, breaking his vow of secrecy towards Gunther. The next day outside the church Kriemhild is stopped because she cannot enter before Brunhild. Brunhild arrives quickly afterwards and Kriemhild reveals to her that it was Siegfried who defeated her both in Iceland and in her bedroom, thereby publicly confronting and insulting Brunhild. She proves her claims by showing Brunhild her former belt around her waist. This drives Brunhild over the edge.

Hagen kills Alberich after not returning the Tarnhelm to him and then serves of council to Gunther after the incident at the church. Hagen points out the betrayal of Siegfried on his vow and his threatening power that could well plot the downfall of Gunther knowing Siegfried also had a claim to the throne, being married to the king's sister Kriemhild. He tells Gunther that the people will not forget the way Siegfried had substituted for him both in Iceland and in the privacy of his room; he convinces Gunther that they may go as far as to believe that any son of Gunther is a bastard son of Siegfried. Gunther decides to send Siegfried back to Xanten and out of Burgundy, but is then stopped by Brunhild, who establishes that the punishment is far too light, and describing herself as disgraced and fooled, she asks for Siegfried's death to Gunther. He refuses at first, given his relationship with Siegfried, but reluctantly accepts because Brunhild threatens to kill herself if the punishment is not carried out. Gunther is disillusioned but Hagen plans on Siegfried's death the next day during the hunt as a simple accident. Siegfried confronts Kriemhild who breaks down after thinking about all she has done, Siegfried assures her that everything is all right, and that they are leaving to live in Xanten the next day after the hunt. The men leave for the hunt, where Gunther and Hagen plot to cause Siegfried's death, but for a long time they are unable to. Kriemhild confronts Brunhild again and returns her belt; Brunhild reveals that her troubled state of mind is because of Siegfried forgetting about their love. Kriemhild, realizing that Siegfried's previous love was in fact Brunhild, is devastated with guilt and confesses the use of the potion given to her by Hagen.

Brunhild realizes that it was not Siegfried's fault that he forgot her, and that she has just sentenced him to death. On the hunt Hagen kills Siegfried by throwing a javelin through his weak spot (which Hagen found out about by eavesdropping while Siegfried and Gunther were going through a blood brother ritual). Siegfried remembers his love for Brunhild and says her name before death seizes him. His body is found by Giselher before they must go back to Burgund and it is wept over by Kriemhild. Gunther claims it was a Saxon ambush but she accuses him of murder by envy and guilt. She throws the Nibelung's ring onto the ground (Siegfried gave it to her as engagement ring) and Gunther and Hagen fight over it to Gunther's death. Giselher then tries to kill Hagen but is easily overpowered. A vengeful Brunhild arrives and furiously kills the men who allied themselves with Hagen using the belt that Kriemhild returned to her earlier. Brunhild defeats and beheads Hagen and disappears.

Epilogue

Kriemhild places the ring on Siegfried's hand as they give him a pagan funeral. Giselher wishes the Pagan gods would live again on his death but Lena tells him that the Pagan gods die with him. When the boat has burst into flames, Brunhild appears from below Siegfried's altar and kills herself with his sword. She collapses on top of Siegfried's body and the boat sinks into the river, where the treasure hoard is shown having been thrown into.

== Cast ==
- Kristanna Loken as Brunhild
- Benno Furmann as Eric / Siegfried
  - Ryan Slabbert as Young Siegfried
- Alicia Witt as Kriemhild
- Max von Sydow as Eyvind
- Julian Sands as Hagen
- Samuel West as King Gunther
- Robert Pattinson as Giselher
- Sean Higgs as Alberich
- Götz Otto as Saxon King Thorkwin
- Ralf Moeller as Saxon King Thorkilt
- Tamsin MacCarthy as Queen Siegland
- Leonard Moss as King Siegmund
- Dean Slater as Dankwart

== Soundtrack ==
The original motion picture soundtrack to Dark Kingdom: The Dragon King was released on 7 March 2006 on Dancing Ferret records (DFD203-16), and contains tracks from various artists.

=== Track listing ===
1. "Drachengold" by E Nomine – 3:32
2. "Gone With the Wind" by Blackmore's Night – 5:15
3. "Somewhere Before" by The Dreamside – 4:44
4. "Drachentöter" by Schandmaul – 4:19
5. "Uthark Runa" by Therion – 4:39
6. "Prolog Andro" by Faun – 4:10
7. "Owe War Sint Verswunden (Nibelungs Edit)" by Estampie – 3:12
8. "Winterborn (Subway To Sally Remix)" by The Crüxshadows – 2:48
9. "Unda" by Faun – 5:06
10. "Egodram!" by Das Ich – 2:35
11. "Shadow of the Moon" by Blackmore's Night – 4:57
12. "Dulcissima (Cantus Buranus Carmina Burana)" by Corvus Corax – 4:58
13. "Forsaken" by The Dreamside – 5:08
14. "Schicksal" by Ilan Eshkeri – 4:20
15. "Eversleeping" by Xandria – 3:38
16. "Todesfinale" by Ilan Eshkeri – 2:51
17. "Remember Me (Kriemhild Edit)" by Qntal – 3:07
18. "Lebenslicht" by Barbi Schiller – 3:41
19. "Riding on the Rocks" by Katie Knight Adams – 4:00

== See also ==
- List of historical drama films
- Late Antiquity
- Germanic Heroic Age
