= Shadowbox =

2005 video and EP by The Crüxshadows

Video by The Crüxshadows
- Released: July 5, 2005
- Recorded: 2005
- Genres: Dark wave, gothic rock, synthpop, electro-goth
- Label: Dancing Ferret Discs

The Crüxshadows chronology
| Fortress in Flames (2004) | Shadowbox (2005) | Sophia EP (2006) |

Shadowbox is a DVD and accompanying EP by The Crüxshadows.

== DVD features ==
1. Live concert from Leipzig, Germany
2. Music videos for "Dragonfly", "Edge of the World", "Cruelty" and "Winterborn (This Sacrifice)"
3. Featurettes including a band interview, tour documentary and festival picture gallery
4. Bonus easter eggs including the video for "Open Your Eyes" by The Dreamside featuring Rogue, live performance at Zillo, and a slideshow

== CD track listing ==
1. "ForeverLast" (single version)
2. "Helen" (No Troy Mix / Extended version)
3. "ForeverLast" (Mesh Remix)
4. "Dragonfly" (Conjure One Remix)
5. "ForeverLast" (Night Version)
6. "...Only Sleep"
7. "Dragonfly" (video/radio edit)
8. "Edge of the World" (Skinny Puppy remix)
