= Nutopia (disambiguation) =

Nutopia ("The Country of Peace") is a fictional country created by John Lennon and Yoko Ono.

Other uses include:

- "Nutopia", a track on the 1999 Meg Lee Chin album Piece and Love
- Nutopia (production company), a US/UK television production company
- "Nutopian International Anthem", a track from the 1973 John Lennon album Mind Games
- (N)utopia, an album by Graveworm
