= Tears (The Crüxshadows album) =

Tears EP

EP by The Crüxshadows
- Released: December 4th, 2001
- Recorded: 2001
- Genre: Dark wave, synthpop
- Label: Dancing Ferret Discs

The Crüxshadows chronology
Echoes and Artifacts (2001)	Tears EP (2001)	Wishfire (2002)

Tears is an EP by The Crüxshadows released in 2001 on Dancing Ferret Discs. The album contains the eponymous single from the band's Wishfire album and an acoustic version of "Heaven's Gaze" from their 1999 album The Mystery of the Whisper.

== Track listing ==
1. "Tears"
2. "Tears" (Apoptygma Berzerk remix)
3. "Within"
4. "Tears" (Robbie Tronco/Knobhead remix)
5. "Jabberwocky"
6. "Tears" (Fictional remix)
7. "Heaven's Gaze" (acoustic tears edit)
