= Ring of the Nibelungs =

Ring of the Nibelungs may refer to:

- Der Ring des Nibelungen, (The Ring of the Nibelung) an opera cycle by Richard Wagner
- Dark Kingdom: The Dragon King (also titled Ring of the Nibelungs), a 2004 German television film directed by Uli Edel

== See also ==
- Nibelungenlied (The Song of the Nibelungs), an epic poem by an anonymous author
