= Quicksilver (EP) =

Quicksilver EP

EP by The Crüxshadows
- Released: September 8th, 2009
- Recorded: 2009
- Genre: Dark wave, dark electro
- Label: Wishfire Records
- Producer: Rogue

The Crüxshadows chronology
Immortal CD (2008)	Quicksilver EP (2009)	Valkyrie (2011)

Quicksilver is a 2009 EP released by The Crüxshadows. It peaked at No. 1 on the Billboard Hot Dance Singles Sales, and No. 2 on the Hot 100 Singles Sales, making it their most successful releases, tied with Birthday.

== Track listing ==
1. "Quicksilver"
2. "Quicksilver" (radio edit)
3. "Avalanche"
4. "Quicksilver" (Dancefloor Transformation)
5. "Roland"
