= Seclusion (disambiguation) =

Seclusion is shutting out, or keeping apart, from company, society, the world etc.

Seclusion may also refer to:

- Solitude
- Seclusion (Penumbra album), 2003
- Seclusion (Aereogramme album), 2004
- Warm seclusion, the mature phase of an extratropical cyclone
- Seclusion policy, the former foreign relations policy of Japan whereby nobody could enter or leave the country
