= Telemetry of a Fallen Angel =

1996 album by the Crüxshadows

Studio album by the Crüxshadows
- Released: January 1996
- Genre: Gothic rock; darkwave

The Crüxshadows chronology
| ...Night Crawls In (1993) | Telemetry of a Fallen Angel (1996) | Until the Voices Fade... (1999) |

Telemetry of a Fallen Angel is the second studio album by the American dark wave band the Crüxshadows, released in January 1996.

== Track listing ==
| No. | Title | Length |
|---|---|---|
| 1. | "Descension" | 0:58 |
| 2. | "Monsters" | 4:46 |
| 3. | "Jackal-Head" | 6:32 |
| 4. | "Prometheus" | 1:11 |
| 5. | "Clerestory" | 4:48 |
| 6. | "Walk Away" | 8:09 |
| 7. | "Miss Fortune Returns" | 0:50 |
| 8. | "My World" | 5:24 |
| 9. | "Fallen Angel" | 0:45 |
| 10. | "Hanged Man" | 5:40 |
| 11. | "Purgatory" | 1:48 |
| 12. | "Marilyn, My Bitterness" | 5:53 |
| 13. | "Daedelus Flight... Icarus Falls" | 1:21 |
| 14. | "Satellite" | 5:51 |
| 15. | "Marilyn, My Bitterness (2.0 Radio Edit)" | 5:20 |

== Versions ==
There are four different versions of this album:

- The first version was released in 1995 under their own label, Black Widow Music.
- The second version was released in 1996 under the label, Nesak International.
- The third version was released in 1998 under the label, Dancing Ferret Discs.
- The fourth and last version was released in 2004. All of the songs were remastered and there was a bonus track included: Marilyn, my Bitterness V2.0 Radio Edit.

== Critical reception ==
A reviewer for Keyboard wrote that Telemetry of a Fallen Angel "crosses over into the realm of concept album, detailing the travels of an extraterrestrial probe. The tone is persistently dark, with a restless intellectual bent creeping underneath it all. However, this is not a goth retread. The sounds blend into a single, highly polished sheen; rhythms bounce along energetically, and everything moves along purposefully." Daniel Rubin of The Philadelphia Inquirer called the album "Passionate yet accessible, with lyrics that evoke myths ancient and modern."

== Personnel ==
The Crüxshadows

- "Rogue" (Virgil Roger du Pont III) – lead vocals, backing vocals, electronic drums (Kawai), violin
- Sean Flanagan – keyboards, backing vocals, electronic drums (Roland), sampling, sequencing
- Tim Curry – guitar, backing vocals

Production

- Angel Kane, the Crüxshadows – producers

Design

- "Rogue" – cover artwork, design, layout
- Robyn Easton – cover artwork
- Jeff Maxson and Sean Flanagan – CG artwork
- Jen "Pyromantic" Jawidzik – design, layout
- Sean Goebel – design, layout
- Madem – artwork (album and monsters collage)
- Jessica Lackey – photography
