= The Dreamside =

Dutch rock band

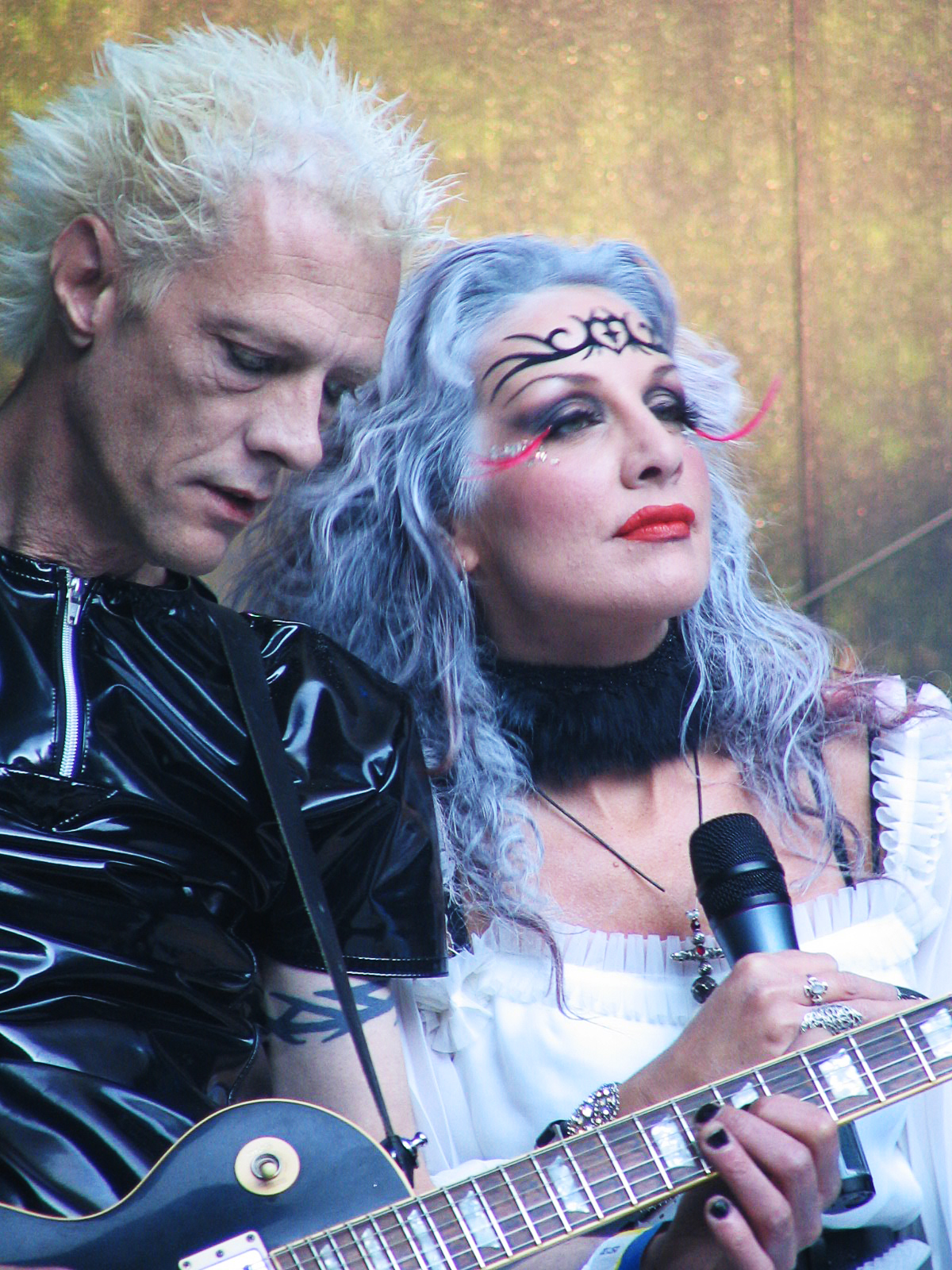
- The Dreamside at the 2006 Wave-Gotik-Treffen

Background information
- Origin: Rotterdam, Netherlands
- Genres: Gothic metal, industrial metal, heavy metal (now), Gothic rock, dark wave (early)
- Years active: 1993–present
- Labels: Nuclear Blast; Serenades Records; Dancing Ferret Discs; Spin Moon Media
- Members: Kemi Vita (Vocals); Roman Schönsee (bass); Fried Bruggink (guitar); Cees Viset (guitar); Louis Buurman (guitar); Merijn Mol (drums)
- Past members: Remco Helbers (Chapman Stick, Programming)
- Website: www.dreamside.nl

The Dreamside is a rock and metal band formed in the Netherlands in 1994.

== History ==
The band was formed by Italian-Dutch singer Kemi Vita. The Dreamside recorded Pale Blue Lights, the band's debut album, pretty much solo with assistance from various musicians; it was released in 1994 to excellent reviews. To tour the album Vita recruited guitarist Fried Bruggink, who became another core member of the band.

The Dreamside's next release, Nuda Veritas (1995), consisted of several dance/techno remixes of songs from their debut album.

In 1996 they released their second album, Apaika, a glossier, more ethereal album than the first. Again reviews were excellent, and the Dreamside steadily became more popular in Europe. They also toured the US for the first time, although to a tepid response, as the American Goth scene had shifted attention to harder-edged styles.

The band took an extended break, recruited bass player, producer and songwriter Roman Schoensee, and returned in 2001 with Mirror Moon, a harder, more metallic album. The group, and particularly Vita, changed looks, abandoning their Victorian-style dress for corsets, rubber and fetish gear. The following year the band returned to the US, releasing Faery Child, a "best of" compilation.

The Dreamside's fourth "proper" album, Spin Moon Magic, was released in September 2005; it continues in the harder, more rock style of Mirror Moon. The band currently consists of Kemi Vita, Roman Schoensee, guitarists Cees Viset, Fried Bruggink and Louis Buurman and drummer Merijn Mol. In August 2011 the band founded here on Label Spin Moon Media and re-released the Mirror Moon album on 23. August.

== Style ==
Their early music is most often described as Darkwave or ethereal wave, tending to the fairy end of the spectrum, although there are also elements of shoegazing, trip hop and industrial, and even early music. After the millennium the band changed their music to a metal-oriented style. They have been compared to everyone from This Mortal Coil and Tori Amos to The Gathering and Nightwish.

== Members ==
=== Current members ===
- Kemi Vita (Vocals)
- Roman Schönsee (bass)
- Fried Bruggink (guitar)
- Cees Viset (guitar)
- Louis Buurman (guitar)
- Merijn Mol (drums)

=== Guest musicians ===
- Diex (Music, Additional Programming)
- Wouter van der Zwaan (guitar, Acoustic guitar)
- Laura Capitani (Viola da gamba)
- 'Smore' (Additional Programming)
- Marijn van der Ven (Piano)
- Rogue (Vocals) (The Crüxshadows)

=== Former members ===
- Remco Helbers (Chapman Stick, Programming) (1993–1996)

== Discography ==
- Pale Blue Lights (1994, Nuclear Blast)
- Apaika (1996, Nuclear Blast)
- Mirror Moon (2001, Serenades Records)
- Faery Child (2002, Dancing Ferret Discs)
- Spin Moon Magic (2005, Dancing Ferret Discs)
- Pale Blue Lights / Nuda Veritas Re-issue (2007, Dancing Ferret Discs)
- The 13th Chapter (2007, Dancing Ferret Discs)
- Lunar Nature (2009, Lion Music)
- Mirror Moon Re-issue (2011, Spin Moon Media)
- Sorrow Bearing Tree (2014, Spin Moon Media)
- Another Spark of Light (2015, Spin Moon Media)

=== Ep's ===
- Nuda Veritas EP (1996, Nuclear Blast)
- Open Your Eyes EP (2005, Dancing Ferret Discs)

=== Singles ===
- Sternenkind (2011, Spin Moon Media)

=== Others ===
- Vier Factor No. 1 (2004, split with The Crüxshadows, Paralysed Age, and ThouShaltNot, Dancing Ferret Discs)
