= Jack Frost (Austrian band) =

Band

- Origin: Linz, Austria
- Genres: Gothic metal, doom metal, dark rock
- Years active: 1993–present
- Labels: Serenades Records, CCP Records, Massacre, W.A.B. Records, Silverdust Records
- Members: Gary Gloom; Collossos Rossos; Mournful Morales; Phred Pfinster
- Website: http://jackfrost.at/

Jack Frost is an Austrian doom/ gloom rock band from Linz, Upper.

== Musical style ==
According to music critic Peter Heymann, the basics of the musical style of Jack Frost is gloomy, sad guitars, deep vocals and discreet rhythm section. Markus Eck described the creative team as "fragile, melodic, depressing, dull music".

== Members ==
- Gary Gloom – Guitars
- Collossos Rossos (Martin Kollross) – Drums (1993–present)
- Mournful Morales (Robert Hackl) – Guitars (1993–present)
- Phred Pfinster (Manfred Klahre) – Vocals, Bass (1993–present)

== Discography ==
=== Demos ===
- Maelstrom (1995)

=== EPs ===
- Blackest (Tour Edition 2015)
- The Fall (2017)

=== Studio albums ===
- Eden (1995)
- Elsewhere (1996)
- Glow Dying Sun (1999)
- Gloom Rock Asylum (2000)
- Self Abusing Uglysex Ungod (2002)
- Wannadie Songs (2005)
- My Own Private Hell (2008)
- Mélaina Cholé (2015)
