= When Daylight's Gone =

Studio album by Graveworm
- Released: 1997
- Recorded: March–April 1997, Soundbunker Studio
- Genre: Symphonic black metal Gothic metal
- Length: 44:44; 64:43 on re-release
- Label: Serenades, Last Episode (re-release)
- Producer: Guido Holzmann

Graveworm chronology
When Daylight's Gone (1997)	As the Angels Reach the Beauty (1999)

Alternative cover

When Daylight's Gone is the debut studio album by the symphonic black metal band Graveworm, released originally in 1997 through Serenades Records but was later re-released in 2001 through Last Episode with bonus tracks taken from the entirety of Underneath the Crescent Moon, the cover of which is the covers of the albums faded together in the middle.

== Track listing ==
All lyrics by Stefan Fiori except tracks 5, 12 & 13. All music by Stefan Unterpertinger with as noted except tracks 12 & 13.

1. "Awake" – 6:29 (Sabine Mair)
2. "Lost Yourself" – 5:35 (Harry Klenk)
3. "Far Away" – 7:25
4. "Eternal Winds" – 5:14 (Mair)
5. "Dark Silence" (Instrumental) – 1:32
6. "Tears from My Eyes" – 4:14 (Mair)
7. "When the Sky Turns Black" – 4:59 (Klenk, Mair)
8. "Another Season" – 5:19
9. "Aeons of Desolation" – 4:08 (Stefan Fiori)

Under the Crescent Moon bonus tracks

10. "Awaiting the Shining" – 3:52
11. "Awake... Thy Angels of Sorrow" – 5:03
12. "By the Grace of God" – 4:55
13. "How Many Tears" – 6:05 (Michael Weikath)

== Personnel ==
- Stefano Fiori – vocals
- Stefan Unterpertinger – lead guitar
- Harry Klenk – rhythm guitar
- Didi Schraffel – bass
- Martin Innerbichler – drums
- Sabine Mair – keyboards
- Markus Costabiei – mastering
