= X-Mass Festival =

Annual music festival (1999–2005)

X-Mas Festival
- Genre: Heavy metal
- Dates: December
- Location: Europe
- Years active: 1999-2005

X-Mas Festival was a heavy metal festival/tour held annually in Europe from 1999 to 2005. It was organized by the Belgian booking agency Metallysee. The 2006 and 2007 editions have been cancelled, and the future of the festival is in doubt. Metallysee plans to launch a new tour in January 2008 under the name Black Winter Festival.

== History ==
The 2006 edition was cancelled after Unleashed, Six Feet Under, God Dethroned, Cataract and soon later Krisiun decided to pull out, Trail of Tears disbanded and Soilwork refused to headline the tour. The last announced lineup featured Gorefest, Belphegor, Prostitute Disfigurement, Madder Mortem, SkyForger and Darzamat. The owner of the agency blamed one of his employees for the cancellation, and this person left the company. Despite this, the 2007 edition was also called off without a reason. The lineup should have featured Mayhem, Samael, Malevolent Creation, Onslaught, Wykked Wytch, Blood Red Throne and Innerfire. The Onslaught website claims that the festival has been postponed, and will be held in January 2008 under the name Black Winter Festival.

== Lineups ==
=== 2005 ===
- Hypocrisy
- Exodus
- Entombed
- Naglfar
- Wintersun
- Fear My Thoughts

=== 2004 ===
- Marduk
- Napalm Death
- Finntroll
- Vader
- The Black Dahlia Murder

=== 2003 ===
- Deicide
- Destruction
- Nile
- Amon Amarth
- Akercocke
- Dew-Scented
- Graveworm
- Misery Index

=== 2002 ===
- Six Feet Under
- Exodus
- Marduk
- Immolation
- Kataklysm
- Hate Eternal
- Dying Fetus
- Impaled Nazarene
- Macabre
- Antaeus
- Ragnarok

=== 2001 ===
- Cannibal Corpse
- Kreator
- Marduk
- Nile
- Krisiun
- Vomitory

=== 2000 ===
- Morbid Angel
- Enslaved
- The Crown
- Dying Fetus
- Behemoth
- Hypnos

=== 1999 ===
- Morbid Angel
- Krisiun
- God Dethroned
- Amon Amarth
- Gorgoroth
- Occult
