= Ethernaut =

2003 album by the Crüxshadows

Studio album by the Crüxshadows
- Released: October 21, 2003
- Genres: Synthpop; darkwave
- Length: 72:53
- Label: Dancing Ferret Discs

The Crüxshadows chronology
Frozen Embers EP (2000)	Ethernaut (2003)	Fortress in Flames EP (2004)

Ethernaut is the fifth full-length album release by the American dark wave band the Crüxshadows, released in 2003.

== Critical reception ==
Karin Martinsson of Release Magazine rated it a seven out of ten.

== Track listing ==
1. "Into the Ether"
2. "Cassandra"
3. "Love and Hatred"
4. "Flame"
5. "The Sentiment Inside"
6. "Winter Born (This Sacrifice)"
7. "Untrue"
8. "A Stranger Moment"
9. "Waiting to Leave"
10. "East"
11. "Citadel"
12. "After All"
13. "Esoterica (Through the Ether)"
14. "Helen" *
15. "Live Love Be Believe (Recalling the Dream)" *
- There are 19 tracks, but cuts 14, 15, 16 and 18 are silent, "Helen" is track 17 and "Live Love Be Believe" is track 19.

The song "Citadel" is referenced by a character in the 2006 science fiction novel Von Neumann's War, co-written by John Ringo and Travis Taylor, published by Baen Books. The lyrics are quoted in full in the Epilogue. The song "Winter Born (This Sacrifice)" is referenced in several of Ringo's novels, including "Ghost" and "To Sail a Darkling Sea."

== Credits ==
- Artwork By [Art & Design] – Melissa
- Artwork By [Cover] – Chad Michael Ward
- Guitar, Backing Vocals – Stacey
- Keyboards, Noises [Sounds] – Chris
- Mastered By [With] – CXS, Trevor Brown
- Cover Model – Jessica Lackey
- Photography – Frederik Görges, Jessica Lackey, Sebastian Reichelt
- Producer, Mastered By, Written-By – Rogue
- Violin, Keyboards – Rachel
- Vocals, Lyrics By, Music By – Rogue
