= As the Dark Against My Halo =

Studio album by The Crüxshadows
- Released: August 7, 2012
- Recorded: 2012
- Genre: Synthpop, electronic rock
- Length: 77:47
- Label: Wishfire Records
- Producer: Rogue

The Crüxshadows chronology
Valkyrie (2011)	As the Dark Against My Halo (2012)	Helios (2016)

As the Dark Against My Halo is a 2012 studio album by The Crüxshadows, released by Wishfire Records. It was also available at the last concerts of their tour.

== Style and concept ==
The album features a mix of Dark Wave, synthpop, and alternative rock.

The album has been inspired by mythology and literature. According to singer Rogue, the song "Matchstick Girl" refers to Hans Christian Andersen's fairy tale The Little Match Girl.

== Reception ==
Professional ratings
Review scores
Source	Rating
Terrorizer	4/5
Sonic Seducer	positive

As the Dark Against My Halo received mixed reviews from the musical press.

Terrorizer marked the quality of the production and specifically lauded the string arrangements. The Sonic Seducer was equally positive about the songwriting and instrumentation, and noted a more complex sound compared to earlier works of the band. The reviewer criticised however that the album lacked bass tones and had been produced too high-pitched.

Online music magazines and blogs were often less kind. Reflections of Darkness offered "Call it as you wish but I prefer to call it imagery of Prussian bureaucrats suffering from insomnia."

Brutal Resonance added that "Beats are weak farts, synths sound have no power and depth, and the violins sound like they are recorded through bad microphones in a shed."

== Charts ==
The album is the band's first to reach No. 1 on The German Alternative Charts (DAC). The single Quicksilver, a featured song on the album, reached No. 1 on the Billboard Hot Dance Singles Sales Chart and No. 2 on the Billboard Hot Singles Sales Chart in the United States.

== Track listing ==
No.	Title	Length
1.	"And I Believe"	2:38
2.	"Valkyrie"	6:03
3.	"Halo"	6:09
4.	"Burning"	6:27
5.	"Sleepless"	5:16
6.	"Quicksilver"	5:26
7.	"The Infinite Tear"	4:18
8.	"Indivisible"	6:23
9.	"Porcelain"	5:27
10.	"Angelus Everlasting"	5:37
11.	"Sentinel"	6:11
12.	"Matchstick Girl"	6:54
13.	"Dark Matter"	6:06
14.	"Africanus"	4:52
