= Frozen Embers =

2003 EP by the Crüxshadows

EP by The Crüxshadows
- Released: August 5, 2003
- Recorded: 2003
- Genre: Dark wave; synthpop
- Label: Dancing Ferret Discs

The Crüxshadows chronology
Wishfire (2002)	Frozen Embers (2003)	Ethernaut (2003)

Frozen Embers is an EP released in 2003 by the American dark wave band the Crüxshadows. It contains tracks from the subsequent full length release, Ethernaut, remixes of tracks from Wishfire, and new tracks.

== Track listing ==
1. "Winter Born (This Sacrifice)" (album version)
2. "Dance Floor Metaphor"
3. "Return (Coming Home)" (Dreamside Remix Part I)
4. "Return (Coming Home)" (Dreamside Remix Part II)
5. "Seraphs" (Revox Lost Souls Mix)
6. "Winter Born (This Sacrifice)" (Club/Radio Edit)
7. "Go Away" (Future Bible Heroes Remix)
8. "Sinking"
9. "Return (Coming Home)" (Assemblage23 Remix)
10. "Winter Born (This Sacrifice)" (Sacrificial Acoustic Version)
11. "Return (Coming Home)" (Tenebrous Remix)
12. "Return (Coming Home)" (DJ Ian Fford 555 Remix)
13. "Deception" (Original English version)

== Credits ==
- Cover Art - Rogue
- Graphic Design - Melissa
- Flute, Other [Opinions] - Jessica Lackey
- Guitar, Backing Vocals - Stacey Campbell
- Keyboards - Chris Brantley
- Keyboards, Violin, Cello - Rachel McDonnell
- Photography - Monaco
- Technician - Trevor Brown
- Vocals, Programmed By, Technician [Sequences] – Rogue
- Written-By - Rogue, The Crüxshadows
