= Echoes and Artifacts =

Studio album by The Crüxshadows
- Released: 2001 (Tour only); November 2, 2004 (retail)
- Genre: Darkwave
- Label: Dancing Ferret Discs

The Crüxshadows chronology
Paradox Addendum (2000)	Echoes and Artifacts (2001)	Tears EP (2002)

Echoes and Artifacts (2001) is a compilation album of songs by The Crüxshadows. The album was initially released as 'Intercontinental Drift' limited to 1000 discs and later renamed to 'Echoes and Artifacts' with the re-release 2004. It includes two covers; T-Rex's "Ballrooms of Mars" and the Eurythmics' "Here Comes the Rain Again".

== Track listing ==
No.	Title	Writer(s)	Length
1.	"Eurydice"		4:44
2.	"Monsters v2.0"		5:08
3.	"Marilyn, My Bitterness v2.0"		6:53
4.	"Crop Circles"		0:30
5.	"Ballrooms on Mars"	Marc Bolan	5:03
6.	"The Dying Song"		5:43
7.	"Leave Me Alone (Shaft 20/20 Mix)"		6:48
8.	"Here Comes the Rain Again"	Lennox, Stewart	5:46
9.	"Cruelty (Cruel Vocal)"		6:22
10.	"Bloodline v2.0"		6:51
11.	"Täuschung (Deception auf Deutsch)"		5:04

== Credits ==
- Guitar - Kevin Page, Stacey Campbell, Tim Curry
- Keyboards - Sean Flanagan
- Keyboards, Technician [Analog Modeling] - Chris Brantley
- Keyboards, Violin - Rachel McDonnell
- Mastered By - Rogue, Trevor Brown
- Vocals, Programmed By, Sequenced By, Other [Etc.] - Rogue
- Written By - Rogue Or Rogue & The Crüxshadows (tracks: 1 to 4, 6 to 7, 9 to 11), Marc Bolan (track 5), Annie Lennox, Dave Stewart (track 8)
