= DreamCypher =

Studio album by The Crüxshadows
- Released: January 16, 2007
- Recorded: 2006
- Genres: Synthpop, electronic rock
- Length: 73:39
- Label: Dancing Ferret Discs

The Crüxshadows chronology
Sophia (2006)	DreamCypher (2007)	Birthday (2007)

Professional ratings
Review scores
Source	Rating
AllMusic	4/5 stars

DreamCypher is a 2007 album by The Crüxshadows, released on Dancing Ferret Discs.

== Style and concept ==
DreamCypher features cover and interior art by visual artist MANDEM, and interior art by Pawn Feral, Velma O'Neal, Steven Archer of Ego Likeness, Rogue, and Jessica Lackey.

== Charts ==
The first single from the CD, their 2006 single, Sophia, made its debut on the Billboard charts in the issue dated September 23, 2006. Sophia debuted at #1 on the Hot Dance Singles Sales chart, replacing Beyoncé in the top spot. At the same time, it placed at #7 on the Hot 100 Singles Sales chart. On both charts, Sophia was the highest-ranking debut entry that week. They hit the charts again with the Sophia single, as well as their new single, Birthday, on September 13, 2007. Birthday made #1 on the Hot Dance Singles Sales chart and #2 on the Hot 100 Singles Sales chart, while Sophia hit the charts again and made #3 and #23, respectively.

== Track listing ==
All tracks by Rogue

1. "Pygmalion's Dream" – 3:20
2. "Windbringer" – 5:34
3. "Sophia" – 6:46
4. "Defender" – 5:50
5. "Perfect" – 7:17
6. "Elissa" – 6:30
7. "Eye of the Storm" – 7:48
8. "Ariadne" – 5:07
9. "Sleepwalking" – 3:09
10. "Solus" – 5:34
11. "Dido's Reply" – 1:18
12. "Memorare" – 7:24
13. "Birthday" – 5:41
14. "Kisses 3" – 2:08

== Personnel ==
- Rogue – lead vocals, violin, programming
- Cassandra Luger - guitar
- JoHanna Moresco - violin
- Rachel McDonnell – keyboard, violin
