= Wishfire =

Fifth album by The Crüxshadows

Studio album by The Crüxshadows
- Released: August 6, 2002
- Genre: Darkwave, synthpop
- Length: 1:06:28
- Label: Dancing Ferret Discs

The Crüxshadows chronology
Tears EP (2002)	Wishfire (2002)	Frozen Embers EP (2004)

Professional ratings
Review scores
Source	Rating
AllMusic	2.5/5 stars

Wishfire is the eighth release from The Crüxshadows and their fifth full-length album which was released in 2002.

== Track listing ==
1. "Before the Fire"
2. "Return (Coming Home)"
3. "Binary"
4. "Seraphs"
5. "Spectators"
6. "Tears"
7. "Go Away"
8. "4th Phase"
9. "Earthfall"
10. "Orphean Wing"
11. "Carnival"
12. "Resist/R"
13. "Roman"
14. "Spiral (Don't Fall)"

== Reception ==
Dean Carlson of AllMusic rated the album two and a half out of five stars, saying it "re-established the [band's] admired dark dance-pop intent." He also stated that the song Tears "[unlocked] a whole new possible direction for the band."
