= Paradox Addendum =

EP by The Crüxshadows
- Released: November 21, 2000
- Genre: Dark wave
- Label: Dancing Ferret Discs

The Crüxshadows chronology
The Mystery of the Whisper (1999)	Paradox Addendum (2000)	Echoes and Artifacts (2001)

Paradox Addendum is an EP by The Crüxshadows released in 2000 on Dancing Ferret Discs. It has seven tracks, including new songs as well as remixes of previously released music.

It features two remixes of "Heaven's Gaze" and one remix of "Cruelty" from the previously released full-length The Mystery of the Whisper. The track "Eurydice" features on 2001's Intercontinental Drift.

== Track listing ==
1. "Love/Tragedy"
2. "Cruelty" (Cruel Night version)
3. "Eurydice (Don't Follow)"
4. "Heaven's Gaze" (Bitter Tears mix)
5. "Ave Maria"
6. "Heaven's Gaze" (OB-1 House Gazing)
7. "Annabel Lee" (spoken)

The CD also includes a QuickTime video for "Cruelty".

== Credits ==
- Guitar – Kevin Page
- Keyboards, Technician [Analog Modeling] – Chris Brantley
- Keyboards, Violin – Rachel McDonnell
- Recorded By, Mastered By – Rogue
- Vocals, Programmed By, Sequenced By – Rogue
