= Until the Voices Fade... =

1999 EP by the Crüxshadows

EP by the Crüxshadows
- Released: May 1, 1999
- Genre: Dark wave
- Length: 32:55

The Crüxshadows chronology
Telemetry of a Fallen Angel (1996)	Until the Voices Fade... (1999)	The Mystery of the Whisper (1999)

Until the Voices Fade... is an EP released by the American dark wave band the Crüxshadows in 1999, as a lead up to The Mystery of the Whisper, an album released later that same year. The song "Here Comes the Rain Again" is a Eurythmics cover.

== Track listing ==
No.	Title	Writer(s)	Length
1.	"Leave Me Alone (Album Version)"		6:49
2.	"Here Comes The Rain Again"	Lennox, Stewart	5:50
3.	"Marilyn, My Bitterness V2.0"		6:50
4.	"Leave Me Alone (OB-1 Freak Mix)"		7:46
5.	"The Dying Song (A Footnote...)"		5:37
