= Serenades Records =

German record label

- Company type: Incentive GmbH
- Industry: record label
- Founded: 1984; Germany
- Headquarters: Schwäbisch Gmünd, Stuttgart, Germany

Serenades Records is a German record label based in Schwäbisch Gmünd, Stuttgart, focused on doom metal and gothic metal. Is owned by Last Episode Records.

== Signed bands ==
- Betray My Secrets
- Casket
- Cryptic Carnage
- Cemetery of Scream
- Darkseed
- Dies Irae
- Dystrophy
- Grave Flowers
- Graveworm
- Haggard
- Jack Frost
- Penumbra
- Sacriversum
- Shade
- Soulsearch
- The Bloodline
