= Cemetery of Scream =

Polish metal band

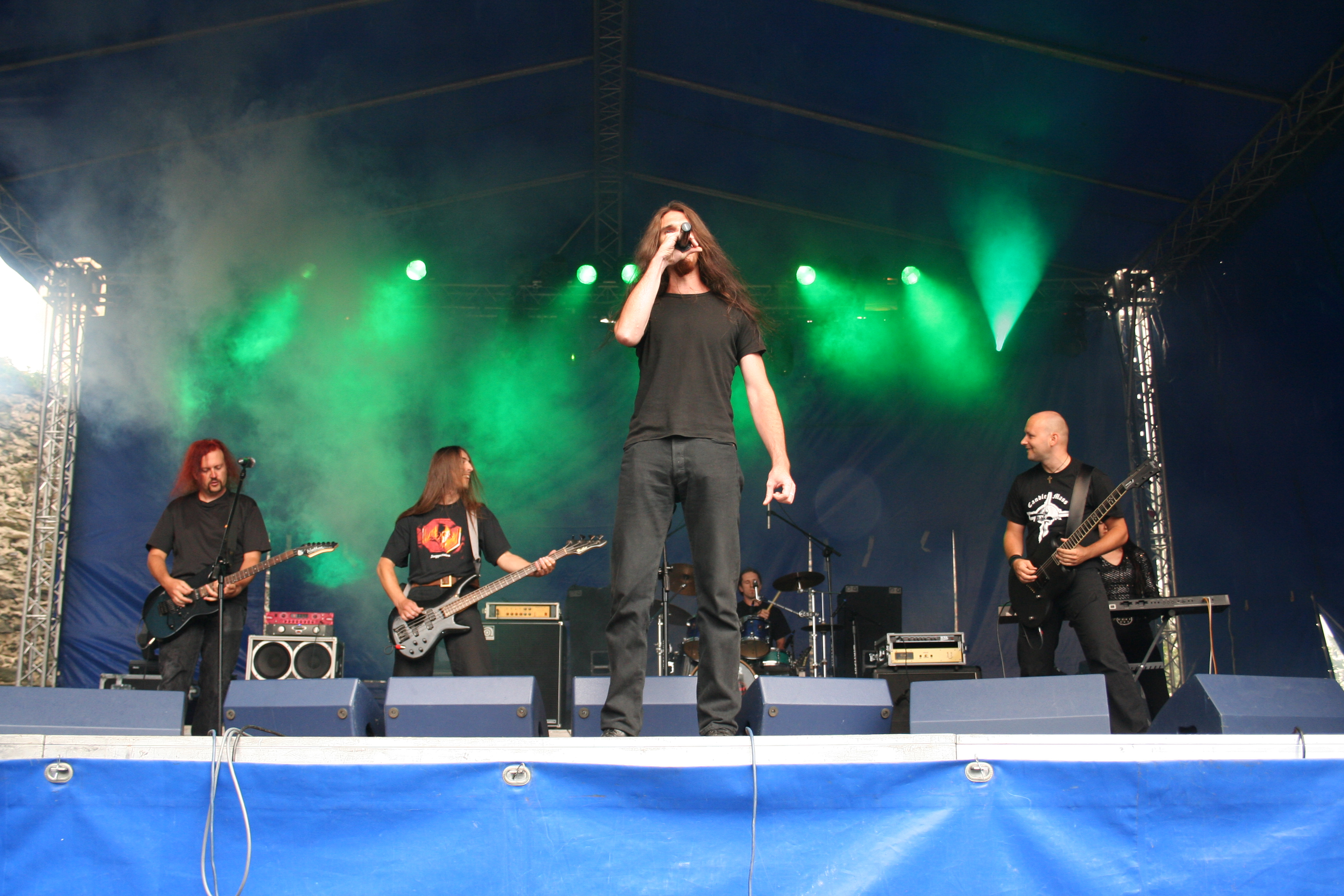
Cemetery of Scream at Castle Party 2007.

Cemetery of Scream is a Polish metal band.

Forming in the 1990s, the band played death and doom metal to which they added gothic metal. The band made their debut in 1995 with Melancholy.

Rock Hard only gave Melancholy a 5.5 out of 10 score, following up with 7 for Deeppression, 5.5 for Prelude to a Sentimental Journey and 7 for The Event Horizon.

Norway's Scream Magazine gave The Event Horizon a bad rating of 2 out of 6, calling it "Brain-dead goth rock with bad tuns and ditto vocals". Conversely, Metal.de rated Prelude to a Sentimental Journey as 9 out of 10, followed by an 8 for Frozen Images. Powermetal.de only gave Frozen Images a 5 out of 10.

== Discography ==
- Melancholy (1995, Croon Records)
- Deeppression (1997, Croon Records)
- Fin de siècle EP (1999)
- Prelude to a Sentimental Journey (2000, Mystic Production)
- The Event Horizon (2006, Metal Mind Productions)
- Frozen Images (2009, Metal Mind Productions)
- Oceans (2023, Sleaszy Rider Records)
