= Birthday (EP) =

Birthday EP

EP by The Crüxshadows
- Released: September 4, 2007
- Recorded: 2007
- Genre: Synthpop
- Label: Dancing Ferret Discs

The Crüxshadows chronology
DreamCypher (2007)	Birthday EP (2007)	Immortal (2008)

Birthday is a 2007 EP released by The Crüxshadows. It is the second single release from the 2007 album DreamCypher. A fan favorite, the band's wish was granted when it outsold their previous single/EP, Sophia. Birthday reached No. 1 on the Hot Dance Singles Sales chart and No 2. on the Hot 100 Singles Sales chart on September 13, 2007, while Sophia reached No. 3 and No. 23, respectively. The EP contains a cover of White Rabbit" by Jefferson Airplane.

== Track listing ==
1. "Birthday"
2. "Birthday" (Radio edit)
3. "The Eighth Square"
4. "Birthday" (Through the Looking Glass club mix)
5. "White Rabbit"
