= Penumbra (band) =

- Origin: Paris, France
- Genres: Symphonic metal, gothic metal
- Years active: 1996 - 2010, 2015 - present
- Labels: Serenades, Season of Mist
- Website: Official Page

Penumbra is a gothic metal band from Paris, France and formed in 1996. Their music is characterized by using a classical mixture of female and male voices, Gregorian chants, bagpipes and other unconventional elements.

"Penumbra" refers to the part of the shadow where the light source is only partially blocked. Part of the light passes through the edges of the object causing a partial shadow.

== History ==
=== Foundation ===
Jarlaath (Maxime Meheust) and Dorian are the original founders of the group, who met at a concert in 1996. Both share a similar vision of music: that there are too many bands with a similar sound, and too few borrowing from classical influences. So they decided to work together, and shortly after they left their groups to form Imperatoria.

Around November 1996, Imperatoria separated, and Jarlaath and Neo (guitar) began anew. During a trip to the US, Neo met some Argentinians and was inspired to rename the group "Penumbra" (Spanish for "Twilight"). Dorian joined, along with three other musicians, and their first appearance was a well-received concert at the St. Denis University Festival in 1997. Shortly after, they were offered to tour of the metal band Misanthrope. The same year they released their first self-produced demo, "Falling Into My Soul."

=== Debut album ===
In the middle of 1998 Benedicte, the keyboardist, left the band to join Misanthrope. He was replaced by Zoltan, and the band added Medusa and Elise as sopranos and Amaris as a baritone. The band recorded its first album, Emanate, in the second half of that year.

Between 1999 and 2000, Penumbra performed in concert in various parts of France, such as Bordeaux and Lyon, as well as internationally in Switzerland and at the Leipzig (Germany) festival.

=== Subsequent albums ===
The second album, The Last Bewitchment, was released three years later in 2002 after an extensive line-up change in 2001, on the Season of Mist label. Following this album, Penumbra performed with Within Temptation and After Forever in France, as well as in the Netherlands.

In 2003 Penumbra released Seclusion, their third album. It featured the guest appearance of the musician Loïc Taillebrest, playing bagpipes on the title track as well as contributing flute to some other tracks on the album.

The band split up at the beginning of 2010, before reforming in 2013 for the creation of their fourth album, titled Era 4.0 and released in 2015 by themselves.

The band released their new album Eden in April 7, 2023, marking their longest gap between albums without splitting up. It is their first album without longtime keyboardist Xavier "Zoltan" Robin and their first with female vocalist Valérie Chantraine.

== Band members ==
=== Current line-up ===
- Jarlaath – vocals, keyboards, lyrics, oboe (1996–present)
- Valérie Chantraine – vocals (2018–present) (ex-Dusk and Darkness, ex-Horkan, ex-Sythera)
- Agone – bass, vocals (2001–present)
- Neo – guitar (1996–present)
- Arathelis – drums (2003–present)
- Loic – guitar (2004–present)

=== Previous members ===
- Xavier "Zoltan" Robin – keyboards, programming, orchestrations (1998-2017)
- Dorian – guitar (1996-2003)
- Asphodel – vocals (2006–2017)

== Discography ==
=== Studio albums ===
- Emanate (1999)
- The Last Bewitchment (2002)
- Seclusion (2003)
- Era 4.0 (2015)
- Eden (2023)

=== Demos ===
- Falling Into My Soul (1997)
- Emanate (1997)
- The Last Bewitchment (2001)
- Eerie Shelter (2007)
