= As the Angels Reach the Beauty =

- Artwork by Luis Royo

Studio album by Graveworm
- Released: 26 September 1999
- Recorded: Newport Studios, St.Lorenzen, Italy
- Genres: Symphonic black metal Gothic metal
- Length: 42:18
- Label: Serenades (#SR 027)

Graveworm chronology
| When Daylight's Gone (1997) | As the Angels Reach the Beauty (1999) | Scourge of Malice (2001) |

Professional ratings
Review scores
| Source | Rating |
|---|---|
| Sputnikmusic | 4.5/5 stars |

As the Angels Reach the Beauty is the second studio album by the symphonic black metal band Graveworm, released on 26 September 1999 through Serenades Records. This is one of Graveworm's more symphonic albums, with strong symphonic metal influences and three symphonic interludes. It was recorded and mixed at Newport Studios, St. Lorenzen, Italy and mastered at Newport Mastering Studios.

The cover artwork is a painting of Luis Royo.

== Track listing ==
All lyrics by Stefano Fiori. All music by Sabine Mair and Stefan Unterpertinger except where noted.

1. "A Dreaming Beauty" – 7:18
2. "Portrait of a Deadly Nightshade" – 4:18
3. "Ceremonial Requiem" (Instrumental) – 3:02
4. "Nocturnal Hymns" – 7:35
5. "Behind the Curtain of Darkness" – 4:54
6. "Pandemonium" (Instrumental) – 2:05 (Maschtl Innerbichler)
7. "Prophecies in Blood" – 5:43
8. "Into the Dust of Eden" – 5:19
9. "Graveyard of Angels" (Instrumental) – 2:04 (Erich Feichter)

== Personnel ==
=== Band members ===
- Stefano Fiori – vocals
- Stefan Unterpertinger – lead guitar
- Harry Klenk – rhythm guitar
- Didi Schraffel – bass
- Martin Innerbichler – drums
- Sabine Mair – keyboards

=== Guest musicians ===
- Hermann Kühebacher – Scottish warpipes
- Urska Stollowa – violin
- Rick van Viechten – violin
- Barbara Mary Stone – viola
- Iston Vegas – violoncello
- Alan Dunn – spoken vocals

=== Technical staff ===
- Adamo Peppino – engineering, mixing
- Reiner Ploner – engineering
- Markus Costabiei – mastering
