= Graveworm =

Italian black metal band

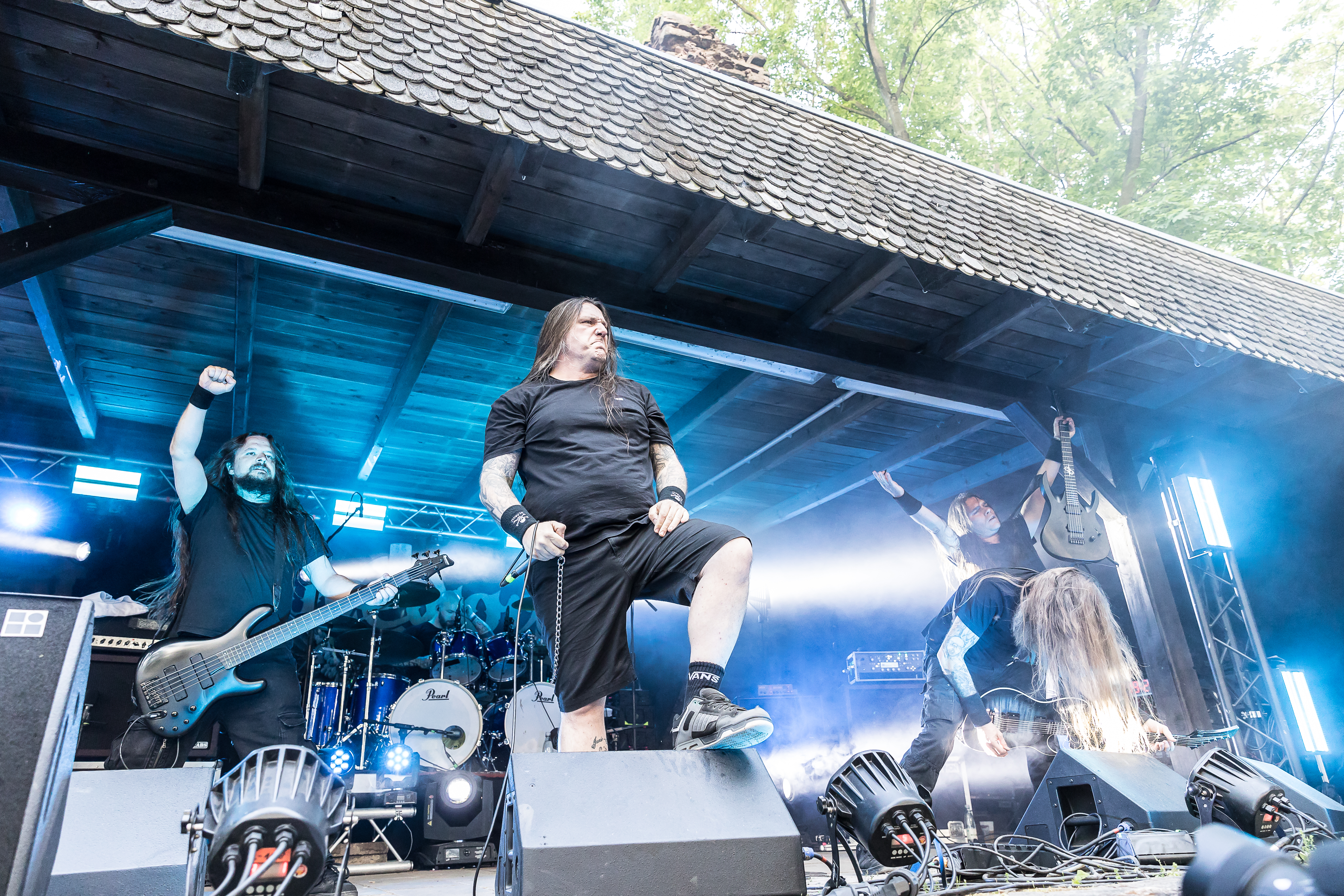
- Graveworm performing in 2024

Background information
- Origin: Bruneck, South Tyrol, Italy
- Genres: Symphonic black metal, melodic death metal, gothic metal
- Years active: 1992–present
- Labels: Serenades, Last Episode, Napalm Records, Nuclear Blast, Massacre
- Members: Stefan Fiori; Stefan Unterpertinger; Florian Reiner; Eric Righi; Moe Harringer
- Past members: Sabine Mair; Thomas Orgler; Lukas Flarer; Moritz Neuner; Didi Schraffel; Eric Treffel; Harry Klenk; Maschtl Innerbichler
- Website: stefanobooking.wixsite.com/gravewormnewshop

Graveworm is an Italian extreme metal band from Brunico, South Tyrol, formed in 1992. They have released ten studio albums.

== History ==
Before Graveworm even released a demo, they were signed by Serenades Records after a performance close to their hometown of Brunico, northern Italy. Graveworm was signed to Serenades Records in 1997, releasing their first EP, Eternal Winds, in that same year. During their first tour together with Crematory, Therion and Lake of Tears, the band promoted the album When Daylight's Gone.

In 1998, the EP Underneath the Crescent Moon was released, featuring Sarah Jezebel Deva (Cradle of Filth, Therion) in the track "Awake... Thy Angels of Sorrow". Graveworm also performed at the Wacken Open Air festival in Germany with bands such as Children of Bodom, Cradle of Filth and Vader.

The second album As the Angels Reach the Beauty was finished in 1999, and followed by a European tour with Agathodaimon. Scourge of Malice was released in 2001, which allowed the band their first headlining tour together with Dornenreich, Vintersorg and Darkwell. In 2002, they changed to the German Nuclear Blast label. At this point, Didi Schraffel (bass) left the band and Harry Klenk (guitars) was replaced by Eric Treffel. Treffel soon left the band in the same year and was replaced by Eric Righi on guitar.

Together with Righi, they produced Engraved in Black, which was finished in 2003, and enhanced with a feature of R.E.M.'s "Losing My Religion". Shortly after the release, Stefan Unterpertinger (guitar) quit and Lukas Flarer joined the band. Also, Harry Klenk, former guitarist and now bassist, re-joined the band.

In 2004, Graveworm played on the X-Mass Festival tour together with Destruction, Kataklysm, and many others. Martin Innerbichler (drums) took a break to study and was temporarily replaced by Moritz Neuner (previously the Darkwell and Shadowcast drummer).

The album (N)utopia was released in 2005.

Lukas Flarer (guitarist) later left the band for personal reasons, and was replaced by Orgler "Stirz" Thomas.

In 2006, Graveworm embarked on a North American tour with Kataklysm, Destruction, The Absence, and Vader.

On 10 April 2007, the promo of Graveworm's then-upcoming album Collateral Defect was leaked on the web. The album was launched in Europe on 25 May via Massacre Records and 5 June in North America through Nuclear Blast. It was produced by Andy Classen at Stage One studios in Borgentreich, Germany.

Graveworm's album Diabolical Figures was released in June 2009 and features Karsten Jäger as a guest musician.

In 2011, Graveworm released album Fragments of Death.

In 2012, Thomas Orgler (guitar) and Sabine Mair (keyboard) quit and Stefan Unterpertinger (guitar) reunited with Graveworm.

On 19 June 2015, Graveworm released their 9th official studio album Ascending Hate.

On 28 April 2023, Graveworm released their 10th official studio album Killing Innocence.

The band is mentioned in Tony Vilgotsky's horror novel Shepherd of the Dead.

== Members ==
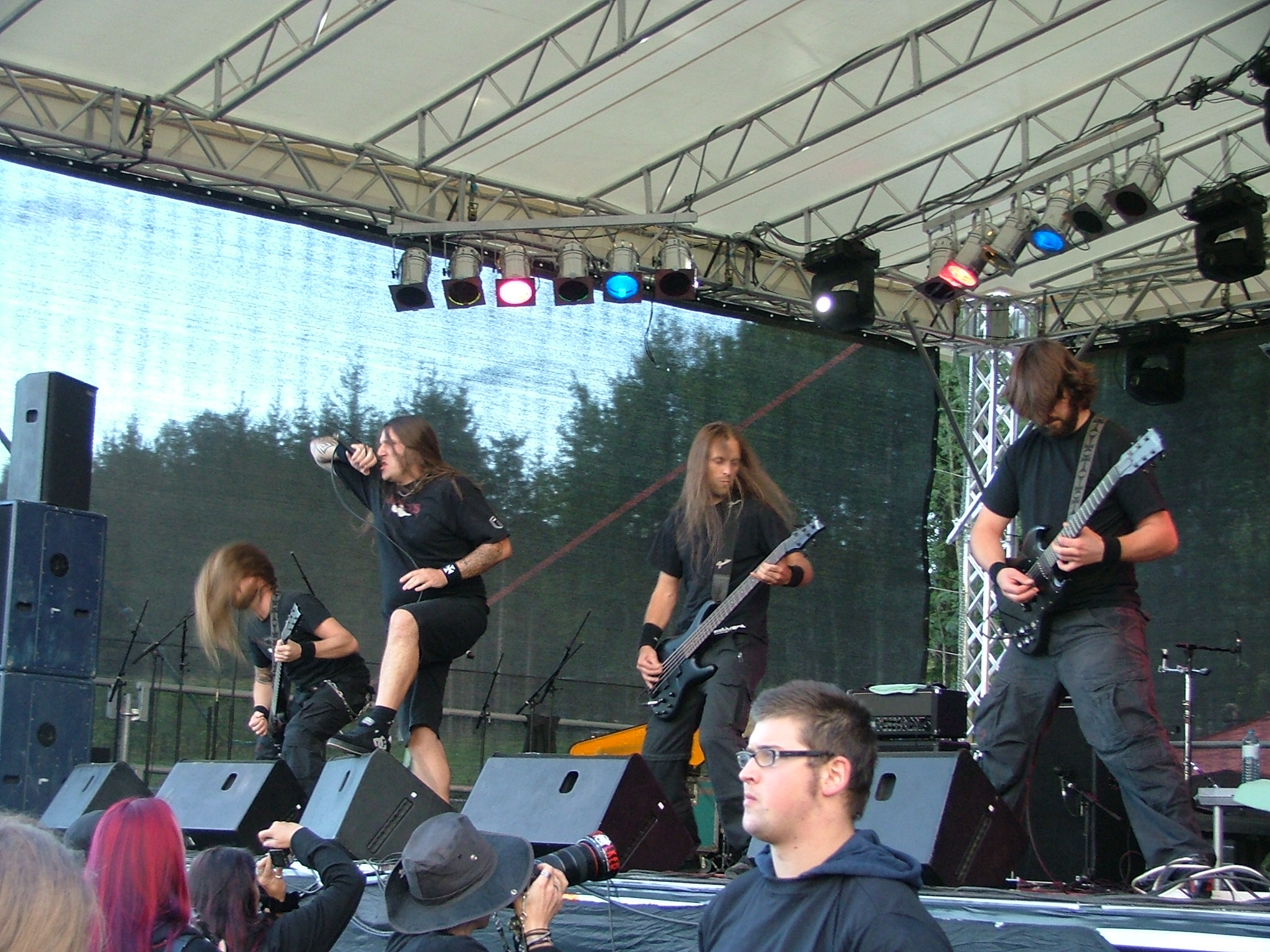
Graveworm performing at Rock the Lake in 2007

- Stefan Fiori – vocals (1992–present)
- Stefan Unterpertinger – lead guitar (1992–2003, 2012–present), keyboards (2012–present)
- Eric Righi – rhythm guitar (2001–present)
- Florian Reiner – bass (2011–present)
- Julian Niederkofler – drums (2024–present)

=== Former members ===
- Lukas Flarer – lead guitar (2003–2005)
- Thomas Orgler – lead guitar (2005–2012)
- Harry Klenk – rhythm guitar (1997–1999), bass (2001–2011)
- Eric Treffel – rhythm guitar (1999–2001)
- Didi Schraffel – bass (1997–2001)
- Maschtl Innerbichler – drums (1995–2004, 2005–2016)
- Moritz Neuner – drums (2004–2005)
- Sabine Mair – keyboards (1997–2012)
- Moe Harringer – drums (2016–2024)

== Discography ==
=== Studio albums ===
- When Daylight's Gone (1997)
- As the Angels Reach the Beauty (1999)
- Scourge of Malice (2001)
- Engraved in Black (2003)
- (N)utopia (2005)
- Collateral Defect (2007)
- Diabolical Figures (2009)
- Fragments of Death (2011)
- Ascending Hate (2015)
- Killing Innocence (2023)
