= Scourge of Malice =

- Artwork by Luis Royo

Studio album by Graveworm
- Released: 31 July 2001
- Studio: Boom Room Studios, Austria
- Genre: Symphonic black metal Gothic metal
- Length: 53:53
- Label: Napalm Records America; Last Episode
- Producer: Graveworm & Boban Milunovic

Graveworm chronology
As the Angels Reach the Beauty (1999)	Scourge of Malice (2001)	Engraved in Black (2003)

Scourge of Malice is the third studio album by the symphonic black metal band Graveworm, released in 2001 through Last Episode.

Their cover of Iron Maiden's "Fear of the Dark" has been famously wrongly credited to Cradle of Filth or Children of Bodom.

== Track listing ==
All songs written by Stefan Fiori and Steve Unterpertinger, except where noted.

1. "Dreaded Time (Intro)" – 1:48
2. "Unhallowed by the Infernal One" – 5:59
3. "Abandoned by Heaven" – 6:08
4. "Descending into Ethereal Mist" – 6:46
5. "Threnody (Instrumental)" (Dedicated to Max Maccani) – 4:30
6. "Demonic Dreams" – 7:23
7. "Fear of the Dark" (Iron Maiden cover) – 8:47
8. "In Vengeance of Our Wrath" – 5:55
9. "Ars Diaboli" (Gregorian chants) – 1:13
10. "Sanctity Within Darkness" – 5:22

== Personnel ==
=== Graveworm ===
- Stefan Fiori – vocals
- Steve Unterpertinger – lead guitar
- Sabine Mair – keyboards
- Eric Treffel – rhythm guitar
- Diddi Schraffel – bass
- Martin Innerbichler – drums

=== Guest musicians ===
- Laura Jungwirt – violin
- Severin Trogbacher – viola
- Theresia Kainzbauern – cello
- Peter Nietsche – bass
- Moritz Polin, Erwig Pfaffenzeller, Jorg Pfaffenzeller – Gregorianic chants on "Ars Diaboli"
- Jorg Pfaffenzeller – acoustic guitar
- Herman Kühebacher – Scottish warpipe

Special guest on "Threnody" by Boban Milunovic
All music written and composed by Graveworm except "Fear of the Dark" by Steve Harris

=== Production ===
- Barbara Sitzmann, Foto Rapid – photography
- Markus Pfeifhofer – design and layout (Mp3) at Newport Graphics
- Boban Milunovic – mastering at Victor, mixing, recording
- Reinhard Brunner – editing at ATS Studio
