= Shinpachi =

Shinpachi (written: 新八 or 親八) is a masculine Japanese given name. Notable people with the name include:

- Nagakura Shinpachi (永倉 新八; 1839–1915), Japanese swordsman and member of the Shinsengumi
- Shinpachi Shimura (志村 新八, Shimura Shinpachi), fictional character from Gin Tama
