= Engraved in Black =

Studio album by Graveworm
- Released: June 23, 2003
- Recorded: 3–26 March 2003
- Genre: Symphonic black metal, gothic metal
- Length: 37:32
- Label: Nuclear Blast
- Producer: Graveworm and Andy Classen

Graveworm chronology
Scourge of Malice (2001)	Engraved in Black (2003)	(N)utopia (2005)

Professional ratings
Review scores
Source	Rating
Allmusic	2.5/5 stars

Engraved in Black is the fourth studio album by the symphonic black metal band Graveworm, released in 2003 through Nuclear Blast. This is the first Graveworm album to feature guitarist Eric Righi, who also played bass on this recording.

== Track listing ==
1. "Dreaming into Reality" – 7:03
2. "Legions Unleashed"' – 5:29
3. "Renaissance in Blood" – 3:42
4. "Thorns of Desolation" – 4:10
5. "Abhorrence" – 4:50
6. "Losing My Religion" (R.E.M. cover) (only on American versions) - 4:24
7. "Drowned in Fear" – 4:49
8. "Beauty of Malice" – 5:25
9. "Apparition of Sorrow" – 2:04

The digipack version contains the following bonus track:

1. "It's a Sin" (Pet Shop Boys cover) - 3:42

The Japanese version contains the following two bonus tracks:

1. "It's a Sin" (Pet Shop Boys cover) - 3:42
2. "Christian Woman" (Type O Negative cover) - 5:34

== Credits ==
- Stefan Fiori - Vocals
- Stefan Unterpertinger - Guitar
- Eric Righi - Guitar & Bass
- Sabine Mair - Keyboard
- Martin Innerbichler - Drums
