= The Mystery of the Whisper =

1999 album by the Crüxshadows

Studio album by the Crüxshadows
- Released: November 30, 1999
- Genre: Gothic rock; dark wave
- Length: 72:54
- Label: Dancing Ferret Discs

The Crüxshadows chronology
Until the Voices Fade... (1999)	The Mystery of the Whisper (1999)	Paradox Addendum (2000)

The Mystery of the Whisper is an album by the American dark wave band the Crüxshadows, released in 1999. This release continues to include songs chronicling "The Angel IV Cycle". The album was remastered and reissued in 2006 as a 2-disc version with the out-of-print EP Until the Voices Fade... (1999).

Monument quotes from the poem 'La Belle Dame sans Merci: A Ballad' by John Keats.

The album was rated 4 out of 5 stars by AllMusic.

== Track listing ==
1. "Isis & Osiris (Life/Death)"
2. "Cruelty"
3. "Leave Me Alone"
4. "Insomnia"
5. "Breathe"
6. "Regrets"
7. "Confusion"
8. "Sympathy (For Tomorrow)"
9. "Aten-Ra"
10. "'Do You Believe...'"
11. "Heaven's Gaze"
12. "Heart on My Sleeve"
13. "'There Are Some Secrets...'"
14. "Nothing"
15. "Even Angels Fall"
16. "MONUMENT"
17. "Death/Reunite"
