= Diabolical Figures =

Studio album by Graveworm
- Released: 26 June 2009
- Recorded: Stage One studios in Borgentreich, Germany
- Genre: Symphonic black metal, gothic metal, melodic black metal
- Label: Massacre
- Producer: Andy Classen

Graveworm chronology
Collateral Defect (2007)	Diabolical Figures (2009)	Fragments of Death (2011)

Professional ratings
Review scores
Source	Rating
Allmusic	3/5 stars
Sputnik Music	3.5/5 stars

Diabolical Figures is the seventh studio album by the symphonic black metal band Graveworm. It was released on 16 June 2009 through Massacre Records. The album was recorded at Stage One studios in Borgentreich, Germany with producer Andy Classen, and features a guest appearance by Karsten "Jagger" Jäger from Disbelief.

== Track listing ==
All tracks are written by Stefan Fiori, Eric Righi and Thomas Orgler; except where noted.

No.	Title	Length
1.	"Vengeance Is Sworn"	4:18
2.	"Circus of the Damned"	5:58
3.	"Diabolical Figures"	4:54
4.	"Hell's Creation"	4:05
5.	"Forlorn Hope" (Fiori, Kastan Jager, Orgler, Righi)	6:27
6.	"Architects of Hate"	4:07
7.	"New Disorder"	3:10
8.	"Message in a Bottle" (Sting) (The Police cover)	4:16
9.	"Ignorance of Gods"	4:56
10.	"The Reckoning"	2:14

== Personnel ==
- Stefan Fiori - Vocals
- Eric Righi - Guitar
- Thomas Orgler - Guitar
- Sabine Mair - Keyboard
- Harry Klenk - Bass
- Martin Innerbichler - Drums
