= Collateral Defect =

Studio album by Graveworm
- Released: 5 June 2007
- Genres: Symphonic black metal, gothic metal, melodic black metal
- Length: 41:04
- Labels: Massacre, Nuclear Blast

Graveworm chronology
| (N)utopia (2005) | Collateral Defect (2007) | Diabolical Figures (2009) |

Collateral Defect is the sixth studio album by the symphonic black metal band Graveworm, released in 2007. It was produced by Andy Classen.

Eduardo Rivadavia of AllMusic rated the album 3 out of 5 stars and wrote that it "should please most fans of Graveworm's risk-taking ways."

== Track listing ==
| No. | Title | Writer(s) | Length |
|---|---|---|---|
| 1. | "Reflections" | Stefan Fiori, Manuel Oberkalmsteiner | 2:27 |
| 2. | "Bloodwork" | Fiori, Thomas Orgler | 3:29 |
| 3. | "Touch of Hate" | Fiori, Eric Righi, Orgler | 3:08 |
| 4. | "Suicide Code" | Fiori, Orgler | 3:51 |
| 5. | "The Day I Die" | Fiori, Orgler | 5:11 |
| 6. | "Fragile Side" | Fiori, Orgler | 4:20 |
| 7. | "I Need a Hero" (Bonnie Tyler cover) | Jim Steinman, Dean Pitchford | 4:33 |
| 8. | "Out of Clouds" | Fiori, Orgler | 3:53 |
| 9. | "Scars of Sorrow" | Fiori, Lukas Flarer | 3:54 |
| 10. | "Memories" | Fiori, Righi | 6:15 |
| 11. | "Which Way" (Bonus track) | | 5:30 |

== Personnel ==
- Stefan Fiori – vocals
- Eric Righi – guitar
- Lukas Flarer – guitar
- Sabine Mair – keyboards
- Harry Klenk – bass
- Martin Innerbichler – drums
