= (N)utopia =

Studio album by Graveworm
- Released: January 11, 2005
- Recorded: September 2004
- Studio: Recorded and mixed at Stage One Studio
- Genre: Symphonic black metal, gothic metal
- Length: 38:50
- Label: Nuclear Blast
- Producer: Graveworm and Andy Classen

Graveworm chronology
Engraved in Black (2003)	(N)utopia (2005)	Collateral Defect (2007)

Professional ratings
Review scores
Source	Rating
Allmusic	2.0/5 stars
Blabbermouth.net	6.5/10 stars

(N)utopia is the fifth studio album by the symphonic black metal band Graveworm, released in 2005 through Nuclear Blast. it was recorded and mixed at Stage One Studio in September 2004.

== Track listing ==
1. "I, The Machine" - 4:39
2. "(N)utopia" - 4:12
3. "Hateful Design" - 4:01
4. "Never Enough" - 4:12
5. "Timeless" - 4:36
6. "Which Way" - 5:32
7. "Deep Inside" - 2:16
8. "Outside Down" - 4:47
9. "MCMXCII" - 4:35
10. "Losing My Religion" (R.E.M. cover) (Digipack Only) - 4:28

== Credits ==
- Stefan Fiori - Vocals
- Eric Righi - Guitar
- Lukas Flarer - Guitar
- Harry Klenk – Bass
- Sabine Mair - Keyboard
- Moritz Neuner - Drums
