= The Crüxshadows =

American dark wave/dark synthpop band

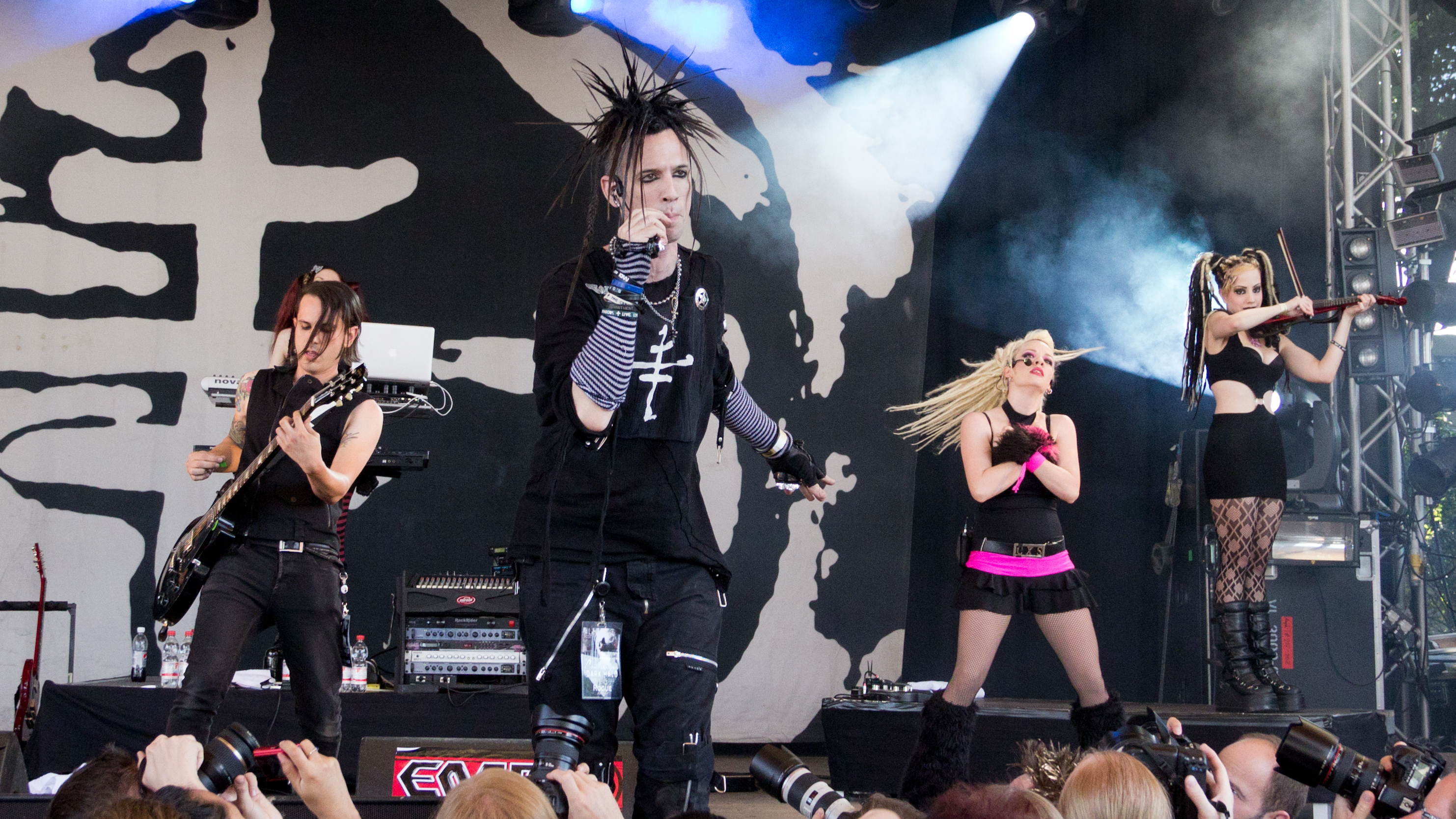
- Performing in Amphi Festival 2012 on July, 22

Background information
- Origin: Tallahassee, Florida, United States
- Genres: Dark wave; synthpop; dance; trance; gothic rock
- Years active: 1992–present
- Label: Wishfire Records
- Members: Rogue; Jen "Pyromantic" Jawidzik; Jessica Lackey; JoHanna Moresco; David Russell Wood; Victoria Witt; Jenne Vermes; Ally Knight; Kam Eubanks
- Past members: Valerie Gentile; Cassandra Luger; Rachel McDonnell; Stacey Campbell; George Bikos; Tim Curry; Kevin Page; Chris Brantley; Trevor Brown; Sean Flanagan; Beth Allen; Holly McCall; Rachel Ulrich; Sarah Poulos; Sarah Stewart; Holly Hasty; Nichole Tadlock; Stacia Hamilton; Mike Perez; Brittney Newsom
- Website: www.cruxshadows.org

The Crüxshadows /ˈkruːʃædoʊz/ is an American dark wave and synthpop band currently based in Jacksonville, Florida, United States. They made their debut with the album ...Night Crawls In (1993), and have since released such albums as Telemetry of a Fallen Angel (1996), DreamCypher (2007), As the Dark Against My Halo (2012), and Astromythology (2017 & 2018). The band has an international fanbase and has toured North America, Europe, and Asia.

== History ==
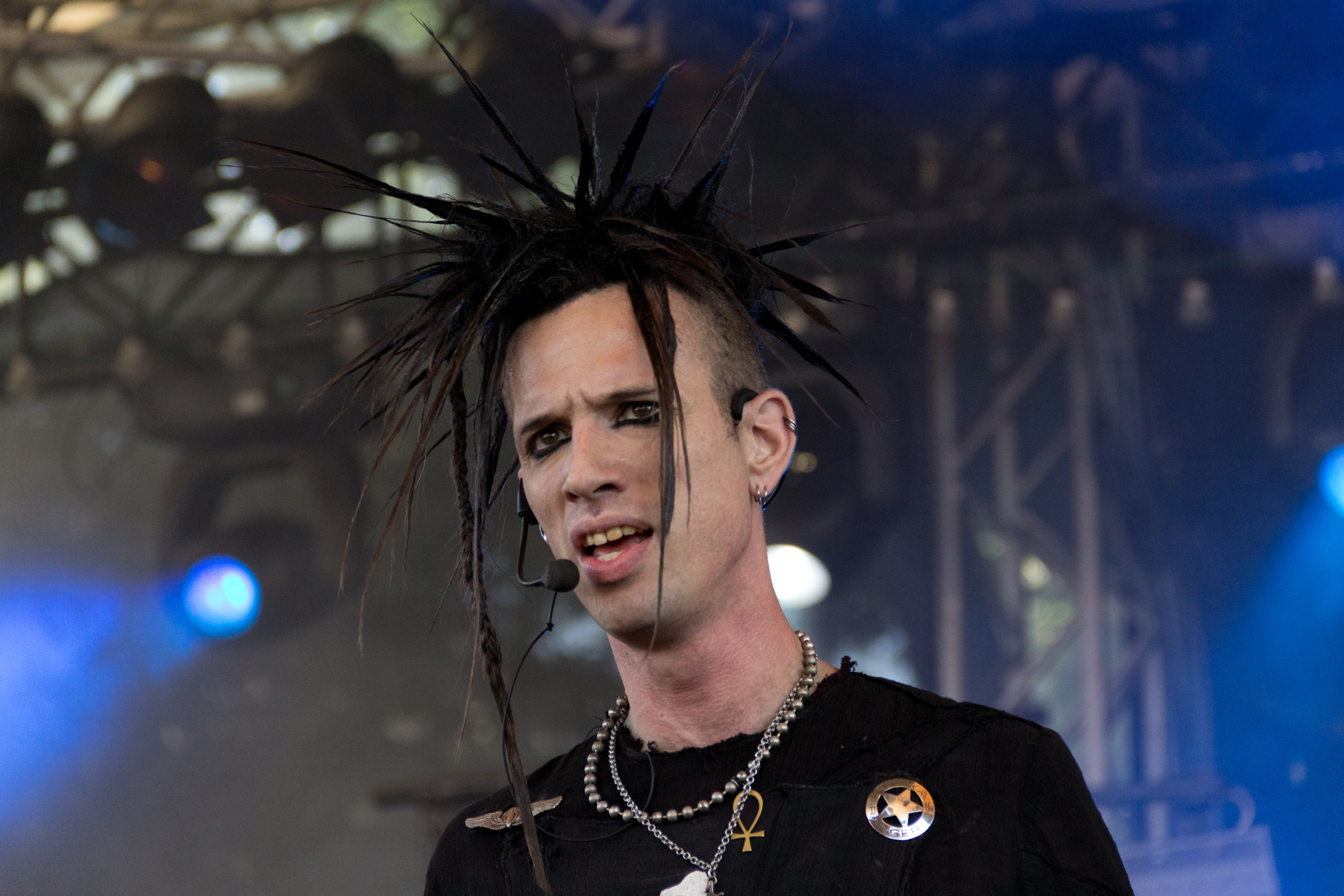
Rogue formed the Crüxshadows in 1992.

The band was originally formed in 1992 by Rogue, Sean Flanagan and Tim Curry, in Tallahassee, Florida. Rogue served as songwriter and lead vocalist, and also played drum machines and electric violins; Flanagan also played drum machines and provided sound synthesis and computer programming; and Curry also provided computer programming, as well as equipment and guitar work. They self-released their debut album, ...Night Crawls In, in 1993, initially only as a cassette.

In 1994, the Crüxshadows recorded and released a cover of T. Rex's "Ballrooms of Mars" on Old School Records, and re-recorded "Bloodline" from their debut release.

In 1996, the band released their second album, Telemetry of a Fallen Angel. Initially it was simply a self released CD, but it was acquired and released by Nesak International/Kato Records, and later released and distributed by Dancing Ferret Discs. Years later it would be acquired by Rogue's own label Wishfire Records.

In 1997, both Sean Flanagan and Tim Curry left the band shortly after signing a record deal with Nesak International/KATO Records. Rogue absorbed their interest in the band as well as their commitments under the new contract, and became the only member of Crüxshadows for a time. Determined not to be dragged down by the comings and goings of other members, Rogue learned to use synthesizers and computers himself to maintain Crüxshadows' musical direction.

Rogue started working on new material for the band's third album in 1998. He recruited several new players including Chris Brantley, Kevin Page, Rachel McDonnell, and Trevor Brown. The band resumed touring nationally and finished work on their third studio album. During this period the Crüxshadows signed an ill-fated deal with New England–based Mere Mortal Records to release The Mystery of the Whisper. A few months prior to putting out the disc, Mere Mortal was forced out of business due in part to its acquisition of a debt-heavy distributor. With a new album, but no label, the Crüxshadows eventually partnered with Patrick Rodgers' startup label Dancing Ferret Discs. The Crüxshadows would spend a little more than a decade signed to Dancing Ferret.

In 1999, with their new label and a new lineup, the band released The Mystery of the Whisper, Until the Voices Fade..., and Paradox Addendum. By this time "Marilyn My Bitterness" and "Monsters" had become staples on the dance floors of a re-invigorated American Gothic-Industrial club scene. Capitalizing on the success of these songs, the band toured the United States relentlessly over the years that followed. The band's song "Eurydice" occupied the top position in the category of New Wave for several months on the charts of digital music pioneer MP3.com.

In 2000, the band contributed a song titled "Deception" to Music from the Succubus Club, released by Dancing Ferret as an accompanying soundtrack album for the tabletop role-playing game Vampire: The Masquerade. This song was also released in a German language version titled "Täuschung". Although "Deception" never charted, it became one of the band's most popular and enduring tracks.

They played their first tour of Europe in 2001 and released a tour CD for their European live shows called Intercontinental Drift, later released as Echoes and Artifacts.

In 2002, the EP Tears debuted at No. 5 in the Deutsche Alternative Charts. The full-length album Wishfire also placed at No. 2 on the DAC. The Crüxshadows toured both North America and Europe in support of their new album.

Ethernaut was released in 2003 featuring another fan favorite song "Winterborn" which also landed at No. 2 on the Deutsch Alternative Charts in Germany. The Crüxshadows continued touring both in the U.S. and throughout Europe.

The Crüxshadows released a remix disc in 2004 based on the material on the Ethernaut CD called Fortress in Flames and followed it up with yet another tour of the United States and Europe.

In 2005, the release of Shadowbox, a live DVD/CD-EP, followed the Crüxshadows on their tour of Europe and featured their headlining performance at the Wave Gothic Treffen in Leipzig Germany.

In 2006 the single release of Sophia saw its debut land at No. 1 on the Billboard Hot Dance Singles Sales chart and at No. 7 on the Hot 100 Singles Sales chart. This was a major breakthrough according to Rogue. Its release coincided with the band's performance at 2006's Dragon Con, where the Rogue gave credit to the support of their SciFi fans in attendance for helping them reach the No. 1 position, unseating the mainstream artist Beyonce from the top position. Jen Jawidzik joined the Crüxshadows, taking over keyboards. The Crüxshadows recorded the song "Wake the White Queen" for the Dancing Ferret-released album Where's Neil When You Need Him?, a tribute album to author Neil Gaiman.

In 2007, the full-length concept album Dreamcypher was released. The single "Birthday" debuted at No. 1 on the Billboard Dance Singles Sales Chart. The band spent almost the entirety of 2007 touring. Their travels took them to China where they played the MIDI Modern Music Festival, one of China's largest Rock music events taking place in Beijing, China in May. Following a year long DreamCypher tour, Rachel McDonnell, George Bikos, and Sarah Poulos all left the group as 2007 drew to a close, and Rogue soon replaced them with guitarist Valerie Gentile, violinist JoHanna Moresco, and violinist David Russel Wood, as well as dancer Sarah Stewart (aka Sarah Kilgore).

In 2008, the EP Immortal was released in July on Rogue's birthday, and became the band's third consecutive single to chart on Billboard, coming in at No. 2 in the United States and landing in the top 5 in Germany.

In 2009, Valerie Gentile was briefly replaced by Cassandra Luger before guitarist Mike Perez took over guitar duties in early 2010 The Crüxshadows would continue to play to bigger audiences in Europe, but 2009 marked the last tour in the United States until several US mini-tours in 2018 and 2019. The EP "Quicksilver" debuted at No. 32 on the Billboard U.S. Hot 100 Singles Sales chart before eventually peaking at the No. 2 position on the Billboard singles chart, and the No. 1 position on the Billboard Dance Chart.

During 2010–2011, the Crüxshadows performed a tour of Europe, but took a year off in 2011 as frontman Rogue and his wife Jessica gave birth to their daughter, Anmi. 2011 Dragon Con was the one and only performance of the band that year. During this time the band had relocated to Jacksonville from Tallahassee, Florida, and Rogue and his crew focused on producing another new album.

The Crüxshadows returned to the road in 2012 and As the Dark Against My Halo became the first Crüxshadows disc to earn a number one position on the German Alternative Charts.

In 2013, Rogue acquired control of the Crüxshadows' artistic works and transferred them to his own label, Wishfire Records. Dancing Ferret and the Crüxshadows released a joint statement notifying the public that the long-time allies were going separate ways. The band toured Europe in support of As the Dark Against My Halo.

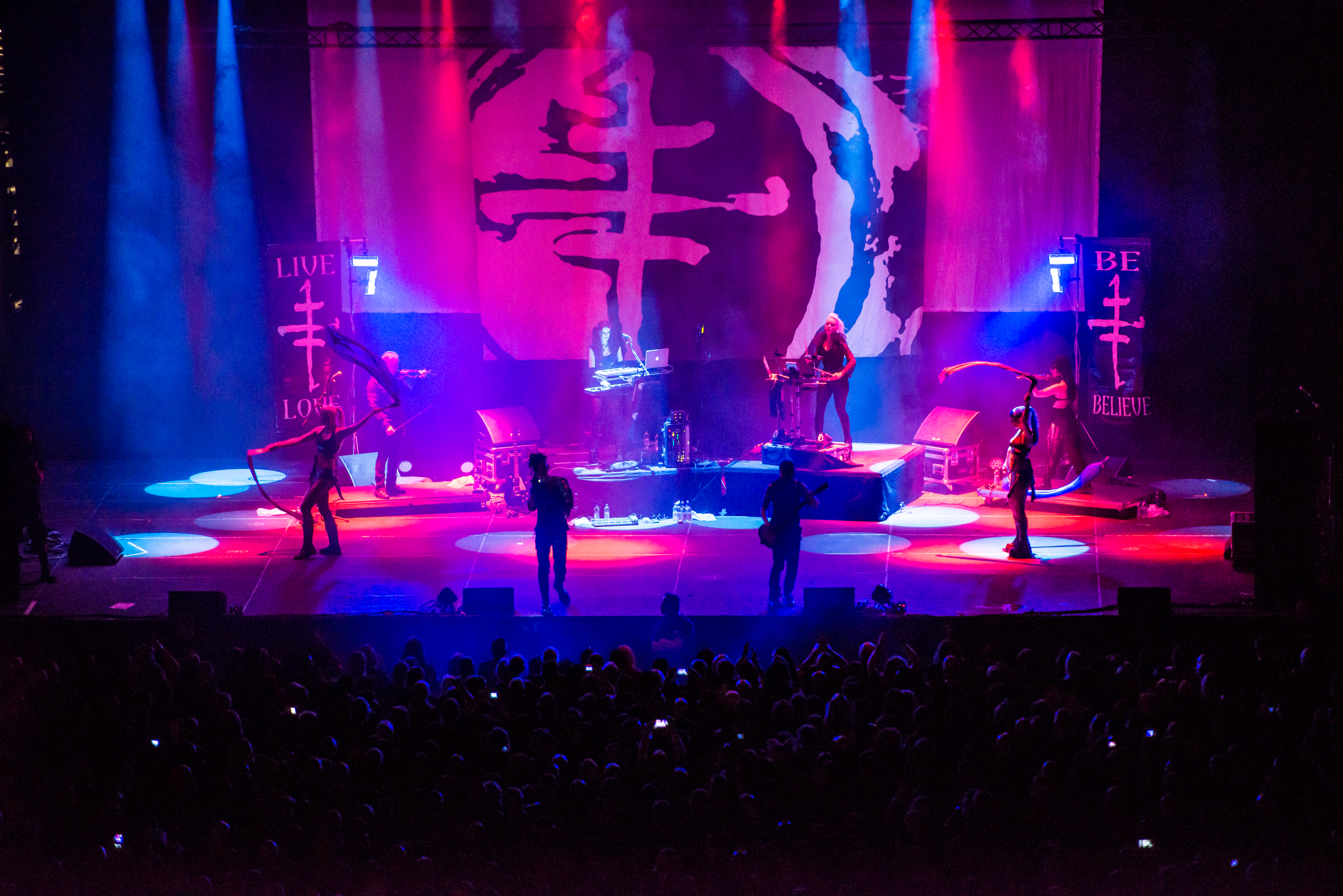
Performing in Germany on July 25, 2015

During 2014 to 2018, Rogue teamed up with Fansation in Germany, a label that released its acts through its partnership with Universal Music, and began working with notable German producer Henning Verlage. During this time, Rogue traveled back and forth to Germany writing, recording, and producing The Crüxshadows' new album. The band performed a very limited number of shows but played several high-profile concerts and festivals including several performances supporting notable label bandmates Unheilig as part of their farewell concerts, including two sold-out outdoor concerts in Leipzig in front of the massive Völkerschlachtdenkmal War Memorial. Their single "Helios" peaked on the Billboard singles chart at the No. 11 position in the U.S. and later in 2017 the single dominated the German Alternative Charts, camping out at the No. 1 position for months.

In 2017, following its lead single "Helios", the Crüxshadows released a new concept album called Astromythology, which tells the story of an astronaut escaping the destruction of the Solar System. Every song represents a planetary body, and the album as a whole becomes an allegory of life changing realities. The album became the Crüxshadows' most popular German release and its first two singles reached number one on the DAC as well as top 10 showings in the mainstream charts. Despite the success of Astromythology, in the wake of declining record sales throughout the industry, the administrators of Fansation and its related companies returned the Crüxshadows rights to Rogue and parted ways.

In 2018, the Crüxshadows released Astromythology in Europe through the album's previous distributor, Timezone Records, and in the rest of the world through their own Wishfire Records imprint. "Home", a ballad about lost love, reached the No. 2 position on the German charts and features the Crüxshadows' highest-budget video to date.

On July 3, 2022, the Crüxshadows released a new single, "All the White Horses (Into the Mirror Darkly)" available for download through their website. In September 2022, after a three-year hiatus from performing at Dragon Con, the Crüxshadows returned to play at the 2022 Dragon Con.

== Labels ==
The Crüxshadows initially self-released two albums under the imprint name Black Widow Music between 1992 and 1996. Those titles were ...Night Crawls In and Telemetry of a Fallen Angel. In 1997, they signed a deal with Nesak International/Kado Records to give Telemetry of a Fallen Angel a full commercial release, as well as an option for a future album. Nesak eventually sold their rights to Dancing Ferret Discs and Mere Mortal Records. Mere Mortal Records went out of business prior to releasing any albums by the Crüxshadows. Dancing Ferret Discs released a number of the Crüxshadows titles over the following ten years. In July 2008, Dancing Ferret Discs announced that it was becoming a catalog label and while existing titles would remain in print, the label would not be releasing new albums. Rather than sign a deal with another label, The Crüxshadows started their own label in mid-2009, in cooperation with several established labels and distributors in different markets worldwide. Their new label was named Wishfire Records and their first release was "Quicksilver", which hit the shelves in the USA on September 8, 2009. The song became their fourth consecutive single to reach the top 10 on the Billboard Hot Dance Singles Charts, and their third to occupy the No. 1 position.

== Touring ==
From 1993 to 1997, the Crüxshadows toured the Eastern portion of the United States. From 1998 until 2008 the band played shows throughout the entirety of the United States and made several trips into Mexico and Canada. In 2001, the Crüxshadows began touring Europe on a regular basis. They also played in various festivals with bands like Bella Morte, Noctivagus, The Ghost of Lemora for example.

In 2007, they were invited to play at the Midi Music Festival in Beijing, China.

In 2009, 2010, & 2015 the band performed on the Gothic Cruise.

Through much of their history, the band has toured the festival circuit in Europe. After The Immortal Tour, from 2008 to 2018, the band played only a very limited number of shows North America, however they have performed annually without fail in Atlanta at DragonCon from 1997-2019, only pausing for the Coronavirus outbreak, and played only the occasional appearance or festival in the United States otherwise, until 2018, when they began performing shows in support of their Astromythology Album.

== Lyrics and concepts ==
Much of the Crüxshadows' music is based on Greek and Egyptian mythology, including symbolic references to a number of mythical figures, and many of their lyrics deal with the concept of God.

== References in popular culture ==
Members of The Crüxshadows at Dragon Con 2026 in Atlanta, GA

References to the band or the band's music appear in the writings by authors Caitlín R. Kiernan, Sherrilyn Kenyon, and John Ringo.

The Crüxshadows' name and likeness have been referenced in comic books like Vertigo/DC Comics' The Dreaming, video games, television shows like CSI, and cartoon strips.

== Members ==
- "Rogue" (Virgil Roger du Pont III) – lead vocals, violin, programming, keyboards
- Jen "Pyromantic" Jawidzik – live synths, backing vocals
- JoHanna Moresco – violin, backing vocals
- David Russell Wood – violin, backing vocals
- Jessica Lackey – live e-drums, backing vocals, former dancer
- Victoria Witt – guitars
- Jenne Vermes – dancer, backing vocals
- Ally Knight – dancer, backing vocals
- Kam Eubanks – dancer

Former or non-active members

- Mike Perez – guitars
- Cassandra Luger – guitars
- Valerie Gentile – guitars, backing vocals
- Rachel McDonnell – keyboards, violin
- Stacey Campbell – guitars, vocals
- George Bikos – guitars
- Tim Curry – guitars
- Kevin Page – guitars
- Chris Brantley – keyboards, vocals
- Trevor Brown – keyboards
- Sean Flanagan – keyboards
- Beth Allen – dancer
- Holly McCall – dancer, backing vocals
- Rachel Ulrich – dancer
- Sarah Poulos – dancer, backing vocals
- Sarah Stewart – dancer, backing vocals
- Holly Hasty – dancer, backing vocals
- Nichole Tadlock – dancer, backing vocals
- Stephanie Griffith – dancer, backing vocals.
- Stacia Marian – dancer, backing vocals
- Brittney Newsom – dancer

== Related projects ==
- Spider Lilies is fronted by Stacey Campbell
- The Labyrinth fronted by Sarah Stewart, who has also played drums for Ayria
- Sapphire Rebellion fronted by Crüxshadows' former guitarist Tim Curry.
- Angelspit has included both Valerie Gentile and George Bikos
- Black Tape for a Blue Girl and Abbey Death have both featured Valerie Gentile, who has also recorded solo synthpop work.
- Cruxshadows backup dancer Jenne Vermes is the head of the tap dance troupe Noise Complaint, and has recorded and released solo tracks under her own name.

== Discography ==
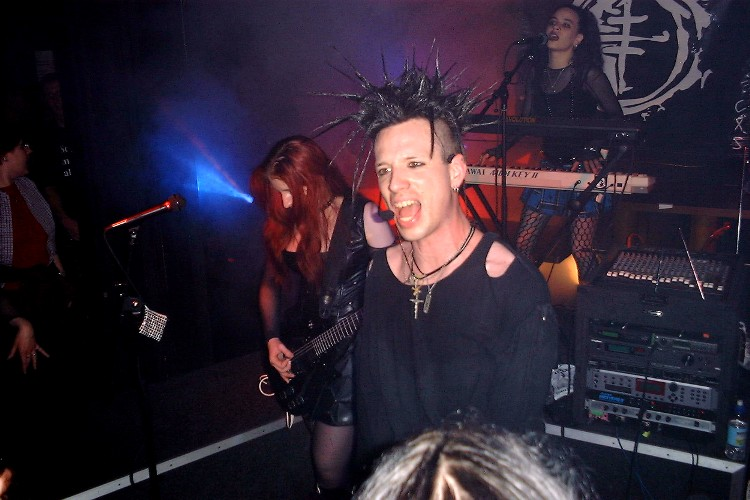
Leverkusen June 12, 2002

=== Albums ===
Released	Title
1993	...Night Crawls In
1996	Telemetry of a Fallen Angel (original release)
1999	The Mystery of the Whisper
2001	Echoes and Artifacts/Intercontinental Drift
2002	Wishfire
2003	Ethernaut
2004	Telemetry of a Fallen Angel (anniversary edition)
2005	...Night Crawls In (reissue)
2006	The Mystery of the Whisper & Until the Voices Fade (reissue)
2007	DreamCypher
2012	As the Dark Against My Halo
2017	Astromythology

=== EPs and singles ===
Released	Title	Type
1999	Until the Voices Fade...	EP
2000	Paradox Addendum	EP
2001	Tears	EP
2003	Frozen Embers	EP
2004	Fortress in Flames	EP
2006	"Sophia"	Single
2007	"Birthday"	Single
2008	"Immortal"	Single
2009	Quicksilver	EP
2011	"Valkyrie"	Single
2016	"Helios" (USA)	Single
2017	"Helios" (Europe)	Single
2017	"Singularities"	Single
2017	"Home"	Single
2022	"All the White Horses (Into the Mirror Darkly)"	Single
2023	”Tomorrow Girl”	Single
2023	”The Kingdom of the Moon”	Single
2024	”Aurora (Eros + Psykhe)”	Single
2025	”A Dream Before Dying”	Single

=== DVDs ===
Released	Title	Type
2005	Shadowbox	CD+DVD

== Chart peak positions ==
- No. 5 "Tears" – (Germany (DAC)Deutsche Alternative Charts) – 2002 Singles Charts
- No. 2 "Wishfire" – (Germany (DAC)Deutsche Alternative Charts) – 2002, Album Charts
- No. 2 "Ethernaut" – (Germany (DAC)Deutsche Alternative Charts) – 2003, Album Charts
- No. 1 "Sophia" – (US Hot Dance Singles Sales) – Issue Date: 2006-09-23
- No. 7 "Sophia" – (US Hot 100 Singles Sales) – Issue Date: 2006-09-23
- No. 1 "Birthday" – (US Hot Dance Singles Sales) – Issue Date: 2007-09-22
- No. 2 "Birthday" – (US Hot 100 Singles Sales) – Issue Date: 2007-09-22
- No. 23 "Sophia" – (US Hot 100 Singles Sales) – Issue Date: 2007-09-22
- No. 2 "Immortal" – (US Hot Dance Singles Sales) – Issue Date: 2008-09-11
- No. 6 "Immortal" – (US Hot 100 Singles Sales) – Issue Date: 2008-09-11
- No. 7 "Quicksilver" – (US Hot Dance Singles Sales) – Issue Date: 2009-09-26
- No. 32 "Quicksilver" – (US Hot 100 Singles Sales) – Issue Date: 2009-09-26
- No. 1 "Quicksilver" – (US Hot Dance Singles Sales) – Issue Date: 2009-11-21
- No. 2 "Quicksilver" – (US Hot 100 Singles Sales) – Issue Date: 2009-11-21
- No. 1 "As the Dark Against My Halo" – (Germany (DAC) Deutsche Alternative Charts) – Week 48, 2012, Album Charts
- No. 11 "Helios" – (US Hot 100 Singles Sales) – Issue Date: 2016
- No. 1 "Astromythology" – (Germany (DAC)Deutsche Alternative Charts) – Sept 2017, Album Charts
- No. 1 "Helios" – (Germany (DAC)Deutsche Alternative Charts) – Jan 2017, Singles Charts
- No. 1 "Helios" – (Germany Native25) – Feb 2017, Singles Charts
- No. 1 "Singularities" – (Germany (DAC)Deutsche Alternative Charts) – Sept 2017, Singles Charts
- No. 2 "Home" – (Germany (DAC)Deutsche Alternative Charts) – Jan 2018, Singles Charts
