= Sünder ohne Zügel =

Studio album by In Extremo
- Released: 3 September 2001
- Length: 54:03
- Label: Island (original German release); Metal Blade (2002 German reissue); Vertigo (2015 German reissue)
- Producer: Thomas Heimann-Trosien; Ekkehard Straubs; VTRAX

In Extremo chronology
Verehrt und angespien (1999)	Sünder ohne Zügel (2001)	Live 2002 (2002)

Sünder ohne Zügel (German for "Unbridled Sinners") is the third album by the German folk metal band In Extremo. It was released in 2001 by Island Records.

== Track listing ==
1. Wind (In Extremo) – 4:25
2. Krummavísur (Jón Thoroddsen/Traditional music/In Extremo) – 3:48
3. Lebensbeichte (life-shrift) (Carmina Burana, 11th or 12th century/In Extremo) – 4:40
4. Merseburger Zaubersprüche II (Merseburg Incantations II) (unknown author, 9th or 10th century/In Extremo) – 4:24
5. Stetit Puella (Carmina Burana, 11th or 12th century/In Extremo) – 4:05
6. Vollmond (full moon) (François Villon???, 15th century/CKay) – 3:46
7. Die Gier (the greed) (In Extremo) – 4:03
8. Omnia Sol Temperat (Carmina Burana, 11th or 12th century/In Extremo) – 4:15
9. Le'or Chiyuchech (In Extremo/Neeman) – 3:11
10. Der Rattenfänger (the Pied Piper [lit. the rat-catcher]) (Goethe/In Extremo) – 4:16
11. Óskasteinar (Hildigunnur Halldórsdóttir/Traditional music/In Extremo) – 3:25
12. Nature Nous Semont (Jean de Beaumont/In Extremo) – 4:32
13. Unter dem Meer (under the sea) (In Extremo) – 5:13

== Personnel ==
- Das letzte Einhorn – vocals, harp, cittern
- Der Lange – guitar
- Die Lutter – bass, marine trumpet
- Der Morgenstern – drums, percussion, timpani, frame drum
- Dr. Pymonte – german bagpipes, shawm, flute, harp
- Flex der Biegsame – german bagpipes, shawm, flute
- Yellow Pfeiffer – german bagpipes, shawm, nyckelharpa
