= Letzte Instanz =

German band

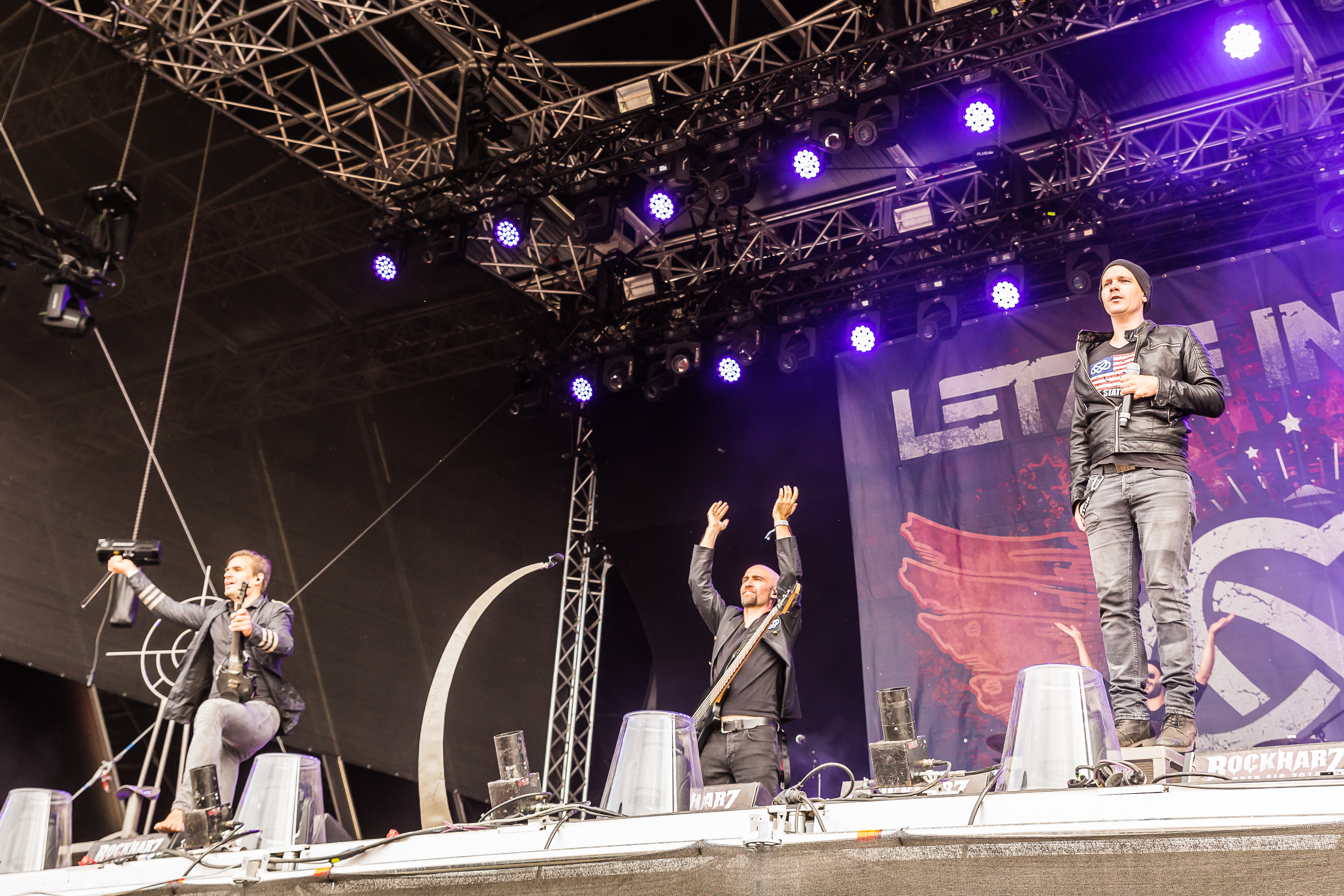
- Letzte Instanz performing at Rockharz Open Air 2018

Background information
- Origin: Dresden, Germany
- Genres: Violin-rock, crossover, medieval rock/metal, folk metal, Neue Deutsche Härte and symphonic metal
- Years active: 1996–present
- Members: Holly; M. Stolz; Benni Cellini; Oli; Michael Ende; Andy Horst
- Past members: Hörbi; Tin Whistle; Kaspar Wichman; Markus G-Punkt; Holly D.; Robin Sohn; Rasta F.; FX; Specki T.D.; David Paetsch
- Website: http://www.letzte-instanz.de

Letzte Instanz is a German violin-rock band, founded in Dresden, Germany, in 1996, particularly noted for their use of the violin and cello. The founding members included Hörbi, Tin Whistle, Muttis Stolz, Kaspar Wichman, Holly D. and Markus G-Punkt. Benni Cellini and Robin Sohn entered the group a year later. To date, they have released eleven studio albums, two live albums, two live DVDs, three singles and have appeared on a number of mix CDs.

== Biography ==
When the band's first album, Brachialromantik (Brute Romance) was released, they earned swift comparisons to the giants of the popular German medieval metal genre like Subway to Sally and Tanzwut, despite objections from the band that this was not an accurate expression of their sound or style. Shortly before the album's release, the singer Hörbi left the band to pursue other projects, and the band was left unsure of themselves and faltering with the public taking little interest in their record.

Enter Robin Sohn and a new era for the band. With sharp, complex German lyrics, the new singer arrived and helped shape a new sound. The result was the critically acclaimed Das Spiel (The Game), a stark departure from the sound of their previous effort. The strings were drawn more into the background and the focus shifted to the conventional band instruments, making room also for electronics. Also, two of the new songs ("Das Ist Der Tag"/"That is the Day", "Das Spiel") let Robin take a break from the microphone and introduced background vocalist Holly D's rap stylings. This album also demonstrates Robin's linguistic versatility, featuring a remake of Camouflage's "Love is a Shield." Shortly after the release, Kaspar departed the band, and the introduction of Rasta F. marked the first in a series of changes in the bass player position.

With their third album, 2001's Kalter Glanz, Letzte Instanz showed their fans and critics that trying to classify their music was a fruitless endeavor, yet again introducing a record with a sound different from either of its predecessors. The strings were pulled slightly more into the background, and the sound had begun to mature as a kind of string-assisted form of modern heavy metal in songs like "Ganz oder gar nicht"/"Completely or not at all" and the title track, and with a continued dedication to their folk music roots in songs like "Oh Fortuna" and "Mein Todestag"/"My dying day." The result is a powerful combination of musical genres, occurring both integrated and drawn into sections, but never completely pulled from one another. Also appearing on the album were two well-known German singers: Marta Jandová from Die Happy and Sven Friedrich from Dreadful Shadows accompanied the septet on 3 songs.

With the introduction of an additional guitarist (Oli), another bass change (FX), and a new drummer (Specki T.D.), the band followed up in September 2003 with Götter Auf Abruf ("Gods on Call"). Though the new sound was not quite as significant a departure from Kalter Glanz as that album had been from its predecessor, the progression toward a heavier, complex blend of modern rock and classical/folk instruments and themes was audible. While the Letzte Instanz of Das Spiel had sounded like a folky horror-themed group with rock instruments thrown in, the band of 2003 had shifted much further to the metal end of the spectrum, with the strings nevertheless always present. The resurgence of Holly D's rap vocals also appears on two tracks. With a more radio-friendly sound, the band was even able to climb into the German album charts.

Later releases include a live CD and DVD, featuring tracks from the three most recent albums plus the track "Kopf oder Zahl"/"Heads or Tails," which first appeared on the German mix Nachtschwärmer Vol.7 in July 2004 after having served well as a closing song for their previous tour.

The band did, however, hit a snag in March 2004 when three integral members (vocalist Robin Sohn, founding guitarist Tin Whistle, and bassist FX) decided to leave the band simultaneously for personal reasons. Many of the band's fans feared that they had heard the last of Letzte Instanz. The remaining members decided not to abandon their eight-year project and actively sought to rebuild their lineup. In the meantime, the two strings players M. Stolz and Benni Cellini took advantage of the break to cooperate with the new band Angelzoom on four songs for their self-titled debut, including the single "Fairyland," and joined them briefly for their Tiefenrausch Tour 2005.

December 2004 saw the introduction of new bass player Michael Ende and, three months later, the band became complete once more, finding a new lead singer in Holly. In June 2005, the band debuted live for the first time with their new lineup, playing new songs for a new era.

In February 2006, the album Ins Licht was released, which peaked at position 53 of Germany's Media Control Charts. The song "Das Stimmlein" on that album features guest singers Eric Fish (Subway To Sally), Sven Friedrich (Zeraphine) and Thomas Lindner (Schandmaul).

The sixth album Wir sind Gold was published in March 2007. The single "Wir sind allein" is a cover version of the Inchtabokatables song "You chained me up". In the year the band released Das weiße Lied, an entirely acoustical album. Apart from new interpretations of old songs it also contained four completely new tracks and a David Bowie cover, "Helden".

The album Schuldig was released in February 2009. The pre-release single "Flucht ins Glück" contained also a track "Der Garten" which Letze Instanz recorded together with singer Aylin Aslım. That song is sung in German and Turkish language.

On 30 May 2010, drummer Specki T.D. announced his departure after eight years with the band and joined In Extremo. He was replaced by David Pätsch, the former drummer of Subway to Sally and member of the Blue Men Group. The album Heilig was published in October 2010. The track "Schau in mein Gesicht" was a pre-release radio edition single.

In 2011, the song "Neue Helden" was released as a single and was chosen as the anthem for the International Ice Hockey Federation's Under 18 world championships in Dresden and Crimmitschau, Saxony.

Founding member Holly D. left the band in 2014. The band's 10th studio album Im Auge des Sturms is to be released in October 2014. It was recorded without the use of synthesizers, loops and sample.

In November 2024, they announced that they would disband in late 2025. Their final studio album was Ehrenwort, released in 2021, and their final release overall was an EP titled XXVII ("27" in Roman numerals, a reference to their 27-year career), released on 7 December 2024. Their final show is expected to take place on 22 November 2025 at the Capitol in Hanover.

== Lineup ==
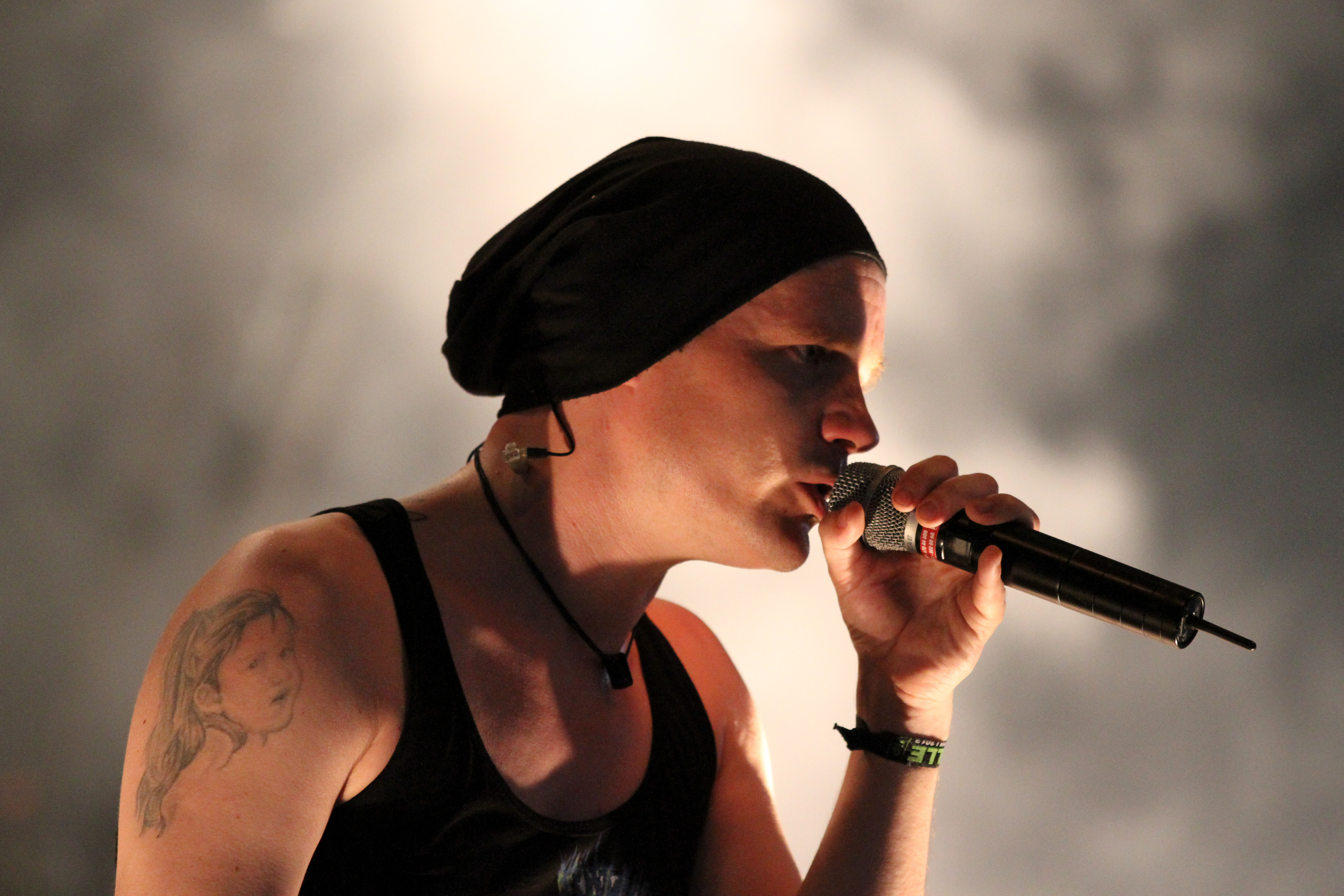
Holly (Wave-Gotik-Treffen 2013

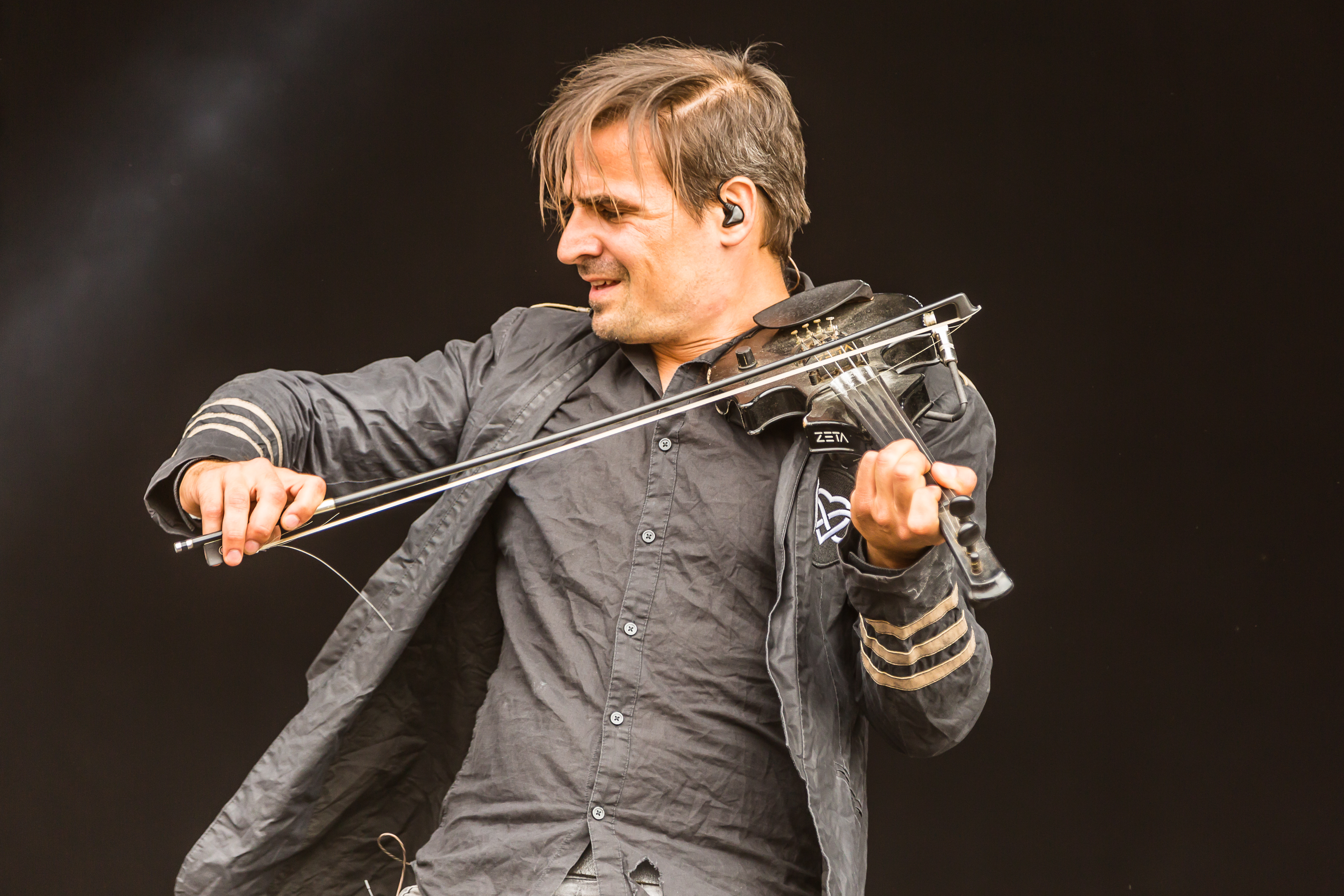
M. Stolz Rockharz Open Air 2018

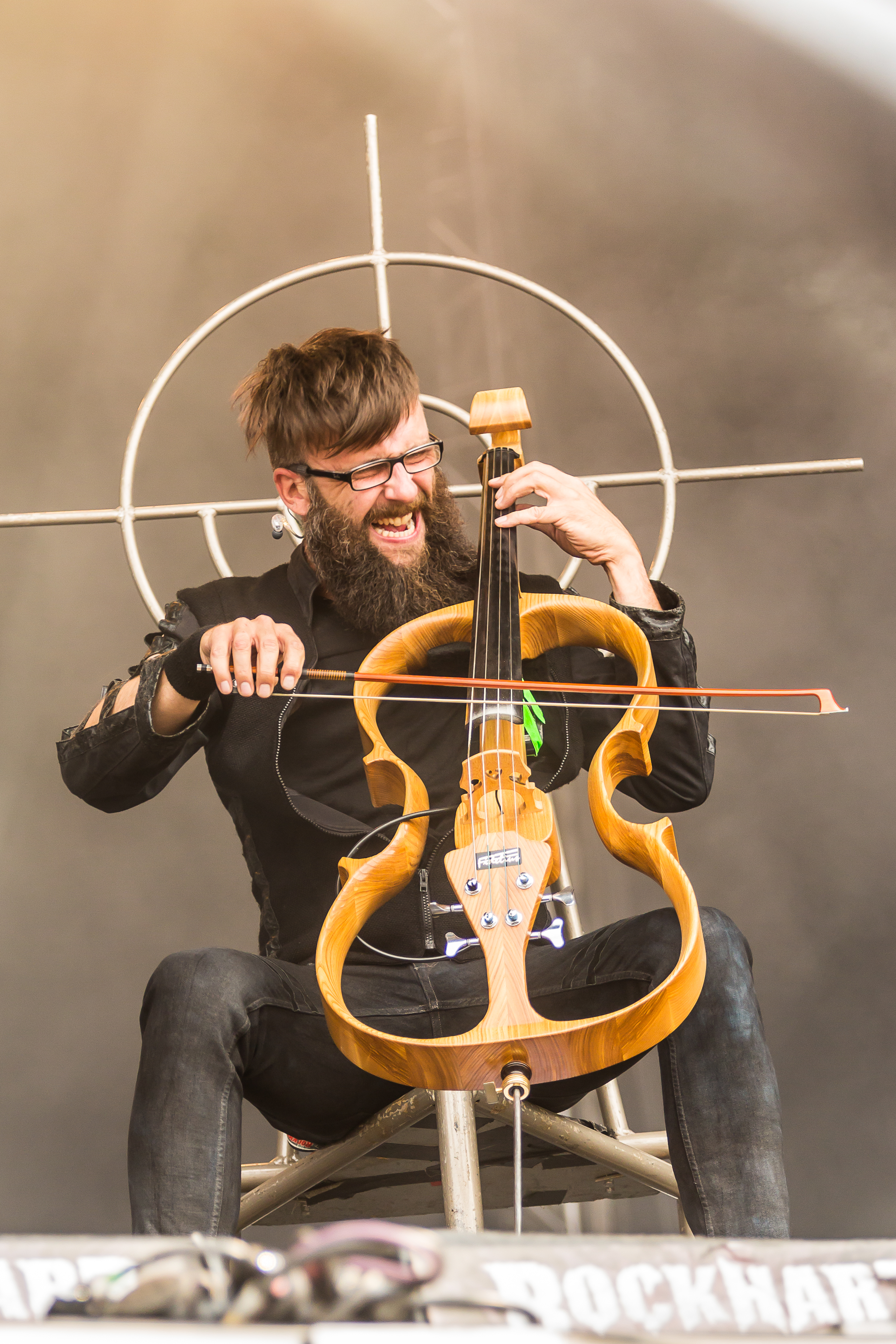
Benni Cellini Rockharz Open Air 2018

=== Current members ===
- Holly Loose — vocals (2005–present)
- Oli — guitar (2002–present)
- Michael Ende — bass (2004–present)
- M. Stolz — violin (1996–present)
- Benni Cellini — cello (1997–present)
- David Pätsch — drums (2010–present)

=== Past members ===
- Hörbi — vocals (1996–1997)
- Kaspar Wichman — bass (1996–1999)
- Markus G-Punkt — drums (1996–2001)
- Tin Whistle — guitar (1996–2004)
- Robin Sohn — vocals (1997–2004)
- Rasta F./FX — bass (1999–2004)
- Specki T.D. — drums (2001–2009)
- Holly D. — background, rap vocals (1996–2014)

== Discography ==
=== Studio albums ===
Year	Title	Peak positions	
Year	Title	GER	AUT
1998	Brachialromantik (Brute Romance)	—	—
1999	Das Spiel (The Game)	—	—
2001	Kalter Glanz (Cold Luster)	—	—
2003	Götter auf Abruf (Gods on Call)	81	—
2006	Ins Licht (Into the Light)	53	—
2007	Wir sind Gold (We Are Gold)	61	—
2007	Das weisse Lied (The White Song)	—	—
2009	Schuldig (Guilty)	34	—
2010	Heilig (Holy)	32	—
2012	Ewig (Eternal)	11	28
2014	Im Auge des Sturms (In the Eye of the Storm)	14	61
2016	Liebe im Krieg (Love in War)	4	44
2018	Morgenland (Orient)	14	—
2021	Ehrenwort (Word of Honor)	—	—
— denotes releases that did not chart.

=== Live albums and compilations ===
Year	Title	GER
2004	Live	—
2013	15 Jahre Brachialromantik (15 years of brute romance)	83
— denotes releases that did not chart.

=== Singles & EPs ===
- 2001 - "Kopfkino" (Head Cinema)
- 2005 - "Sonne" (Sun)
- 2024 - XXVII

=== DVDs ===
Year	Title	GER
2004	Live	—
2008	Weißgold (White Gold) featuring Anna Katharina	64
— denotes releases that did not chart.

=== Projects and individual songs ===
- 2002 - "Vision Thing" on the sampler Thank you Sisters Of Mercy
- 2004 - The strings players (M. Stolz und Benni Cellini) collaborate on the single "Fairyland" and three other songs from Angelzoom's self-titled album.
- 2005 - Oli's second Band FROGSTAR BATTLE MACHINE releases their third album Lez Go Cropcircling
- 2006 - FROGSTAR BATTLE MACHINE releases their fourth CD, an EP called Duck & Cover, including a funny video clip to the song Sex Bubbles
- 2012 - "Tausendschön" released as part of the Sonic Seducer August 2012 compilation
