= Verehrt und angespien =

Studio album by In Extremo
- Released: 30 August 1999
- Length: 51:29
- Label: Mercury Records (original German release); Metal Blade Records (US); Vertigo Records (2015 German reissue)
- Producer: Thomas Heimann-Trosien; Ekkehard Straub; VTRAX

In Extremo chronology
Weckt die Toten! (1998)	Verehrt und angespien (1999)	Sünder ohne Zügel (2001)

Verehrt und angespien ("worshipped and spat upon") is a studio album by the German medieval folk metal band In Extremo. It was released in 1999 by Mercury Records.

== Track listing ==
1. "Merseburger Zaubersprüche" (Unknown author, 10th century/In Extremo) – 4:27
2. "Ich kenne alles (I Know Everything)" (François Villon/In Extremo) – 3:04
3. "Herr Mannelig" (Traditional lyrics and music) – 4:55
4. "Pavane" (Traditional lyrics/In Extremo) – 5:00
5. "Spielmannsfluch (The Gleeman's Bane)" (Ludwig Uhland/In Extremo) – 3:40
6. "Weiberfell" (François Villon/In Extremo) – 4:27
7. "Miss Gordon of Gight" (In Extremo) – 2:09
8. "Werd ich am Galgen hochgezogen (When I Am Hoisted on the Gallows)" (François Villon/In Extremo) – 3:47
9. "This Corrosion" (The Sisters of Mercy cover) – 4:02
10. "Santa Maria" (Traditional lyrics and music/In Extremo) – 4:27
11. "Vänner och Frände" (Traditional lyrics and music) – 3:57
12. "In Extremo" (In Extremo) – 4:26

Bonus track:

1. "Herr Mannelig" (Acoustic Version) – 3:08

== Personnel ==
- Das letzte Einhorn – vocals, harp, cittern
- Thomas der Münzer – guitar
- Die Lutter – bass, marine trumpet
- Der Morgenstern – drums, percussion, timpani
- Dr. Pymonte – German bagpipes, shawm, flute, harp
- Flex der Biegsame – German bagpipes, shawm, flute
- Yellow Pfeiffer – German bagpipes, shawm, flute, nyckelharpa
