= Sverker =

Sverker may refer to:

- Sverker I of Sweden (c. 1100 – 1156), King of Sweden from 1132
- Sverker II of Sweden (before 1167 – 1210), King of Sweden from 1195/1196
- House of Sverker, medieval Swedish royal dynasty
- Sverker (album), 2011 studio album by Corvus Corax
