= Corvus Corax =

Corvus Corax may refer to:

- Common raven (Corvus corax), large songbird
- Corvus Corax (band), German band known for playing medieval music
- Corvus Corax, Warhammer 40,000 character and main protagonist of Deliverance Lost
