= Ihr wolltet Spass =

Studio album by Tanzwut
- Released: 7 April 2003
- Recorded: 2003, Thommy Hein Tonstudios Berlin, Germany
- Genre: Industrial metal, Medieval metal
- Length: 49:09
- Label: PICA Music
- Producer: Thommy Hein, S. Friedrich

Tanzwut chronology
Labyrinth der Sinne (2000)	Ihr wolltet Spass (2003)	Schattenreiter (2006)

Ihr wolltet Spass (German for "You wanted fun") is the third full-length studio album by the German industrial rock/medieval metal band Tanzwut. It was released on 7 April 2003 through German label PICA Music in a digipak format. The album was also unofficially released in a cassette format. The album shows Tanzwut's sound gravitating towards a more industrial metal sound.

== Track listing ==
1. "Wieder da" − 3:47
2. "Nein nein" − 3:13
3. "Der Traum" − 3:58
4. "Meer" − 4:52 (samples by Jonathan Janssen)
5. "Zaubern" − 4:10
6. "Für immer" − 4:28
7. "Fatue" − 3:42
8. "Erdbeerrot" − 3:53
9. "Ihr wolltet Spass" − 3:42
10. "Der Fluch" − 4:36
11. "Gnade" − 4:01
12. "Caupona" − 4:47

== Credits ==
=== Band ===
- Teufel − bagpipes, lead vocals
- Wim − bass, bagpipes, backing vocals, tromba marina
- Castus − bagpipes, shawm, tromba marina, backing vocals
- Koll − bagpipes, shawm, tromba marina, backing vocals
- Patrick − guitar, backing vocals, bagpipes, tromba marina
- Norri − percussion, keyboards

=== Production ===
- Produced, recorded and mixed by Thommy Hein at Thommy Hein Tonstudios (Berlin, Germany) and assisted by S. Friedrich
- Mastered by Tanzwut and Thommy Hein.

=== Music and lyrics ===
- Track 1 and 6: music and lyrics by Themann
- Track 2, 3 and 9–11: music and lyrics by Tanzwut and Themann
- Track 5: music by Tanzwut, lyrics by Tanzwut and Themann
- Track 4 and 8: music and lyrics by Tanzwut
- Track 7: music by Tanzwut, lyrics by Hildegard Von Bingen and Carmina Burana
- Track 12: music by Tanzwut, lyrics from Carmina Burana 76, 1/13
