= Schattenreiter =

Studio album by Tanzwut
- Released: 7 April 2006
- Recorded: 2006
- Genre: Industrial metal Medieval metal
- Length: 33:40 (CD 1); 40:51 (CD 2); 54:59 (CD 2 with video); 74:31 (both CDs); 88:39 (CDs with video)
- Label: PICA Music

Tanzwut chronology
Ihr wolltet Spass (2003)	Schattenreiter (2006)	Weiße Nächte (2011)

Professional ratings
Review scores
Source	Rating
Gothtronic	7/10 stars
Metal1Info	7/10 stars

Schattenreiter is the fourth full-length studio album by the German industrial rock/medieval metal band Tanzwut. It was released on 7 April 2006 through German record label PICA Music as a two-CD digipak. The album marks their newfound sound, which incorporates a more down-tuned use of guitars, darker atmospheres and harsher vocals at times than their previous albums, making them lean towards industrial metal.

The album is eclectic in nature, ranging all the way from industrial metal with "Schattenreiter", thrash metal with "Geisterstunde", and even rockabilly with "Im tiefen Gras" to the gothic-influenced "Spieler" with many songs emanating a dance music feel to them. On the second CD, the song "Toccata" is a reworked version of a J.S. Bach composition which was recorded in a church in Berlin.

== Track listing ==
=== CD 1 ===
1. "Schattenreiter" − 4:22
2. "Der Arzt" − 4:12
3. "Im tiefen Gras" − 3:17
4. "Endlich" − 3:23
5. "Dein zweites Gesicht" − 4:21 (extra vocals by Melanie Wiedemann)
6. "Geisterstunde" − 2:41
7. "Spieler" − 3:55
8. "Seelenverkäufer" − 3:41
9. "Immer noch wach" − 3:48 (featuring Schandmaul)

(Extra bagpipes by Birgit Muggenthaler)
(Violin by Anna Kränzlein)
(Extra vocals by Thomas Lindner)

=== CD 2 ===
1. "Intro" − 0:57
2. "Toccata" − 4:00 (Organ by Dr. Hanno Fierdag, extra vocals by Melanie Wiedemann)
3. "Der Bote" − 4:35
4. "Versuchung" − 5:26
5. "Vulkan" − 3:56
6. "Kaltes Grauen" − 4:10
7. "Du Sagst" − 3:35
8. "Wieder am Riff" − 4:13
9. "Gefangen" − 4:18
10. "Signum Ignitum" − 5:30
11. Video: Tanzwut Live in Moskau 2005 − 14:08

== Credits ==
- Teufel − bagpipes, lead vocals
- Wim − bass, bagpipes, backing vocals, tromba marina
- Castus − bagpipes, shawm, tromba marina, backing vocals
- Ardor − bagpipes, shawm, tromba marina, backing vocals
- Hatz − percussion, key drum, electronic drums, Riesentara, keyboards
- Patrick − guitar, backing vocals, bagpipes, tromba marina
- Norri − percussion, keyboards
