= In Extremo =

German medieval metal band

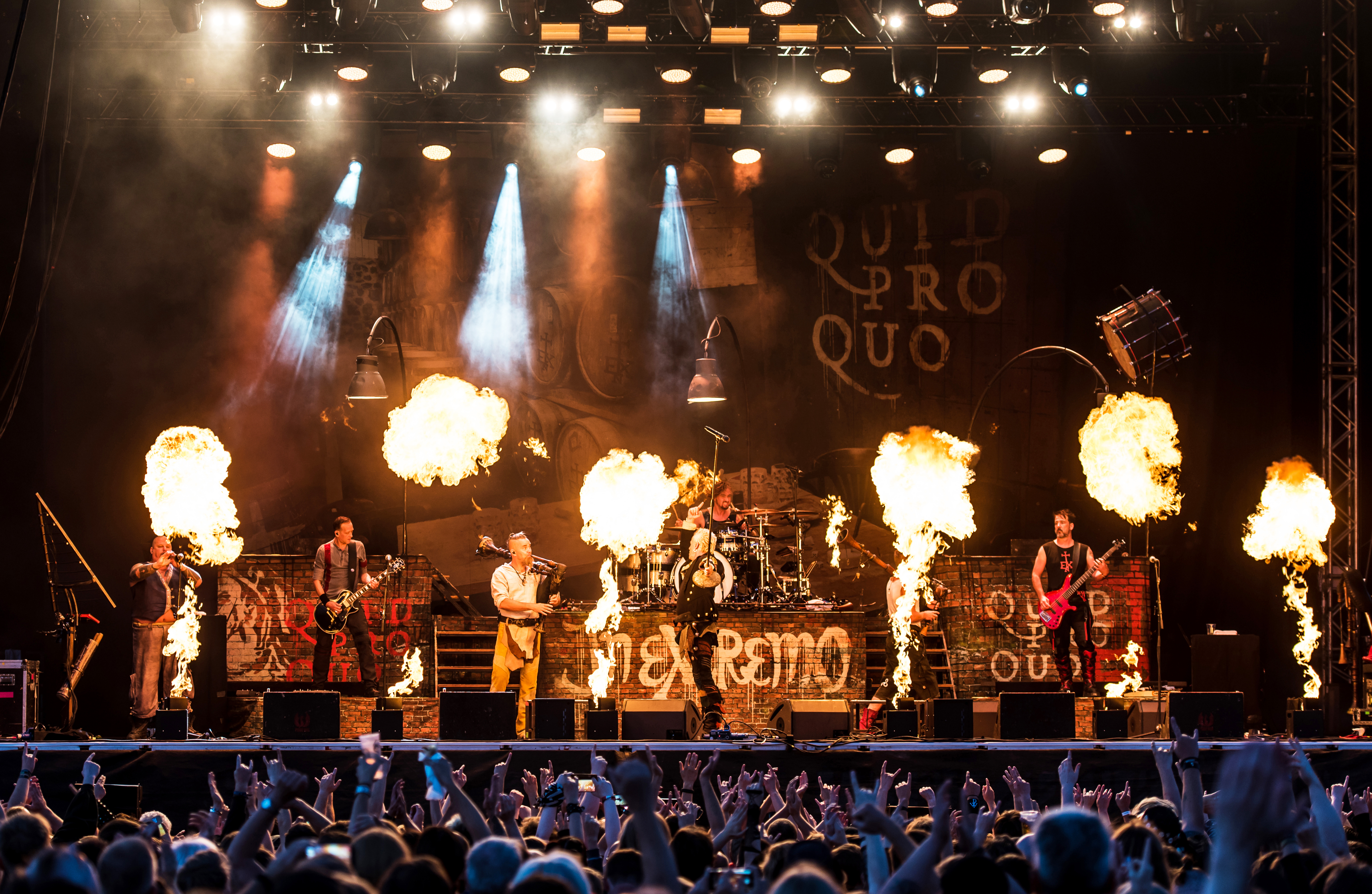
- In Extremo performing in 2018

Background information
- Origin: Berlin, Germany
- Genres: Medieval metal, folk metal, folk rock, neo-Medieval music
- Years active: 1995–present
- Labels: Vielklang, Metal Blade, UMG
- Members: Michael Robert Rhein; Marco Ernst-Felix Zorzytzky; Kay Lutter; André Strugala; Sebastian Oliver Lange; Florian Speckardt
- Past members: Conny Fuchs; Boris Pfeiffer; Mathias Aring; Thomas Mund; Reiner Morgenroth
- Website: www.inextremo.de

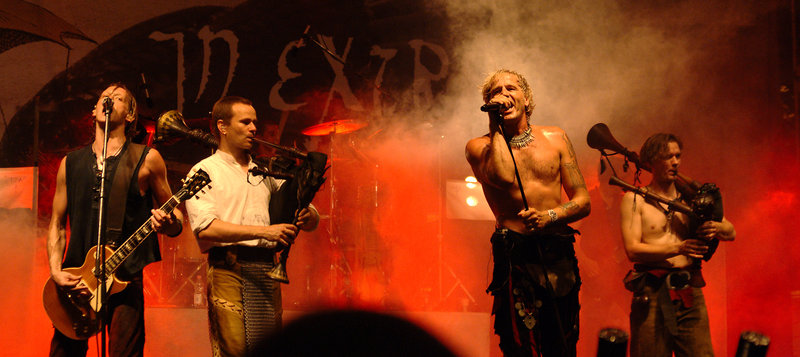
In Extremo in concert

In Extremo (Latin for "At the Edge") is a German medieval metal band formed in Berlin in 1995. Their music blends heavy metal with traditional folk and medieval elements, including bagpipes, hurdy-gurdies, shawms, harps, and lutes.

The band is known for blending modern rock structures with historical texts and melodies, performing songs primarily in German as well as in Latin, Old Norse, Old High German, Occitan, among others. In Extremo is also recognized for its theatrical live performances, which feature medieval costumes and pyrotechnics.

== History ==
=== Origins and formation ===
In Extremo began as two separate projects: an unnamed acoustic medieval group and an electronic rock band. The project was founded by Michael Robert "Micha" Rhein (stage name: Das letzte Einhorn) on 11 April 1995.

The original members included Thomas der Münzer (guitar), Der Morgenstern (drums), and Die Lutter (bass guitar). Most members performed under stage names, including Das letzte Einhorn (vocals), Flex der Biegsame (bagpipes), Dr. Pymonte (bagpipes), Conny Fuchs (who left before the first official release due to pregnancy, and was replaced by Dr. Pymonte), and Sen Pusterbalg (later replaced by Yellow Pfeiffer). As of 2000, guitarist Van Lange replaced Thomas der Münzer. Many members played multiple instruments and often rotated roles between songs.

Until 1997, In Extremo performed separately as a medieval ensemble and a rock project. The band generally marks its first live rock concert on 29 March 1997 as its establishment date. The two projects were formally merged on 11 January 1998. In April 1998, the band held its first large-scale concert at Rabenstein Castle in Brandenburg.

=== Musical development ===
In 1994, the group was encouraged to add traditional folk and medieval instrumentation. The band cited groups such as Corvus Corax and Bathory as influences in its transition toward a hybrid rock sound.

In August 1996, In Extremo began work on its first album, which included two tracks from the emerging rock project. The album was released without an official title and became known as Gold because of its cover design. Released in February 1997, it sold out quickly at medieval markets.

Over time, the band’s sound shifted toward heavier metal influences while continuing to incorporate traditional instruments such as bagpipes, shawms, and lutes.

=== Later history ===
In February 2010, In Extremo announced that drummer Der Morgenstern had left the band due to musical differences. In June 2010, Florian "Specki T.D." Speckardt was introduced as his replacement.

Following this change, the band released five studio albums—Sterneneisen, Kunstraub, Quid Pro Quo, Kompass zur Sonne, and Wolkenschieber—all of which reached the top 10 on the German charts. Sterneneisen, Quid Pro Quo, and Kompass zur Sonne each achieved number-one positions for a period.

In July 2020, In Extremo performed an online livestream concert as part of Wacken World Wide.

=== Appearances ===
The band's first major appearance was in the first part of the 2001 video game Gothic. A group of traveling musicians called 'In-Extremo' played their version of the song "Herr Mannelig" from the album Verehrt und angespien, by the gallows outside the Old Camp Castle in the second chapter of the game. Due to licensing restrictions, the performance is only included in the German version of the game. In the 2026 published video game Gothic 1 Remake the band reappeared again.

The band was invited to participate in the television program Viva Interactive, where they gave a 15-minute call-and-response and played two songs.

The band rejected an invitation to Top of the Pops to play "Küss mich" (transl. Kiss Me). However, they accepted a further invitation to Top of the Pops in 2005 and played "Nur ihr allein" (transl. Only You Alone).

On 2 February 2006, the band introduced themselves on 2 February on the television show TV total.

In Extremo last participated in the Bundesvision Song Contest of Stefan Raab on 9 February 2006 for the Free State of Thuringia. The group occupied the third spot with "Liam (German)".

=== Performances ===
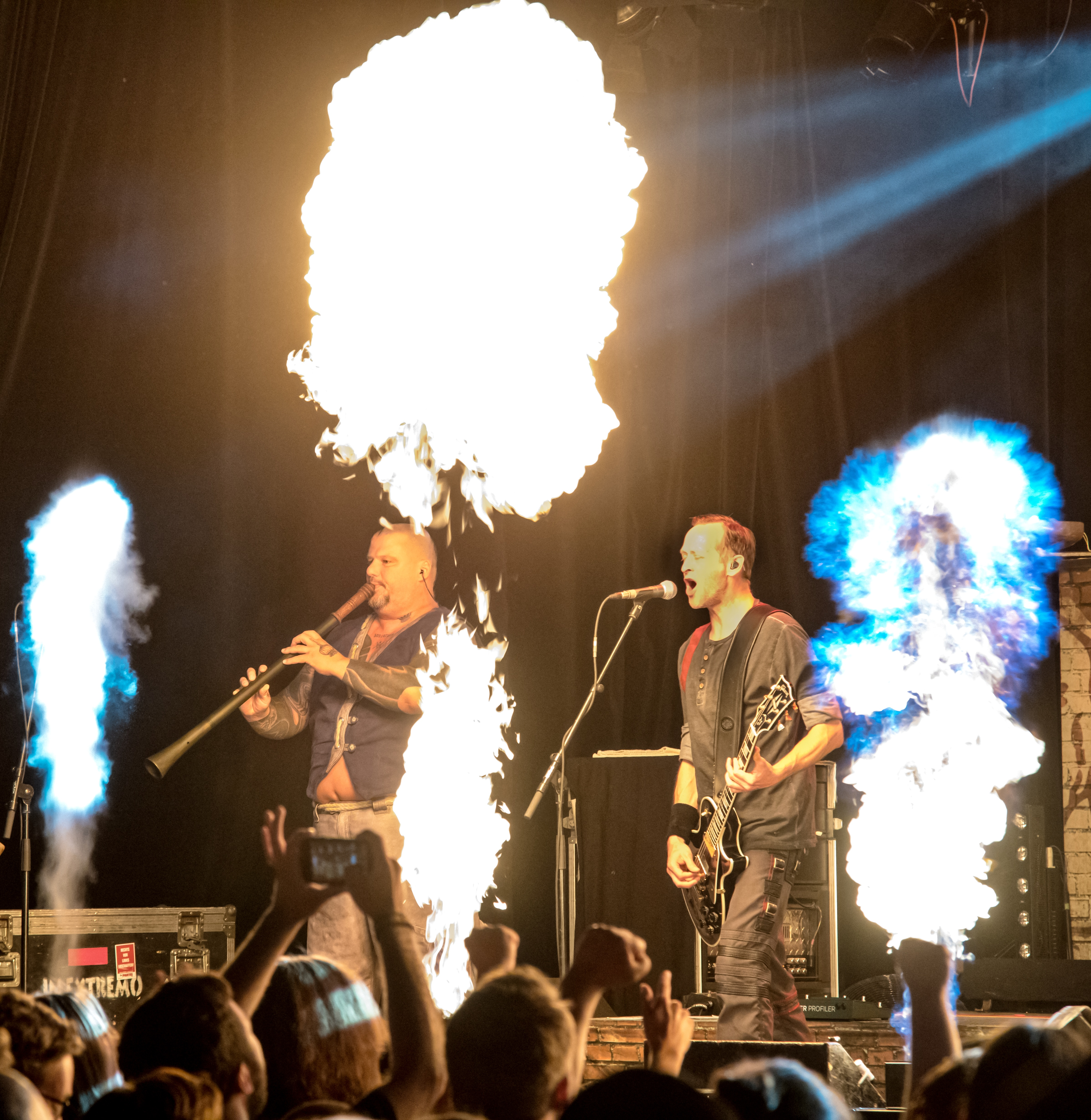
In Extremo at the Zelt-Musik-Festival 2018

The band's largest public appearance was opening for the farewell tour of Böhse Onkelz in June 2005, with about 120,000 spectators.

Notable performances
Year	Event	Location	Ref
	Rock am Ring		
	Taubertal Festival		
	Nova Rock	Austria	
2005	Support for farewell tour of Böhse Onkelz		
2006	Wacken Open Air		
2006	M'era Luna Festival	Hildesheim	
2006	10 Year Anniversary Tour	Germany	
2006	10 Year Anniversary Tour	Austria	
2006	10 Year Anniversary Tour	Switzerland	
2018	Zelt-Musik-Festival		

== Reception ==
The first In Extremo album that attracted attention was Verehrt und angespien (transl. Worshipped and Spat At), achieving 11th place in the German album charts. The subsequent album, Sünder ohne Zügel (transl. Unbridled Sinners), reached 10th place. Their album 7, peaked at number 3 of the German album charts. The video of the single "Küss mich" was frequently shown on German music television.

The band's eighth album, Mein rasend Herz (transl. My Racing Heart), achieved third place on the album charts in 2005. Three singles were published from this album: "Nur ihr allein" (transl. Only You Alone) on 17 May 2005, "Horizont" (transl. Horizon) on 12 September 2005, and "Liam (German)" on 3 February 2006. On 10 February 2006, the second live CD/DVD, Raue Spree, was published, coming in at fourth place on the German charts. 7 and Raue Spree achieved gold status in early 2007.

The ninth album Sängerkrieg (transl. Singers' War) went to first place on the album charts of Germany on 23 May 2008. In Austria, it reached the 13th place, and in Switzerland, the 22nd place. In Germany, it was the 50th best-selling album of 2008.

== Instruments ==
In Extremo uses electric guitar, bass, and a drum set alongside instruments of predominantly medieval origin. This has included the hurdy-gurdy, bagpipes, Uilleann Pipes, shawm, nyckelharpa, harp, cittern, tromba marina, hammered dulcimer, Klangbaum, and various types of drums and percussion. Bagpipes have been the most common of these instruments to be used by the band, as Dr. Pymonte, Yellow Pfeiffer (until 2021), and Flex der Biegsame all play bagpipes, sometimes all three at once. All of the band members play multiple instruments and frequently rotate instruments between songs. Das letzte Einhorn frequently plays a cittern during certain songs such as "Ai vis lo lop".

Their bagpipes were made by Dr. Pymonte and a well-known pipe builder. The band also uses a custom-built frame drum covered in zebra skin, called "Das Pferd" ("The Horse"). Most of the other acoustic instruments, such as their shawms, are only made by a few other instrument builders.

== Style and lyrics ==
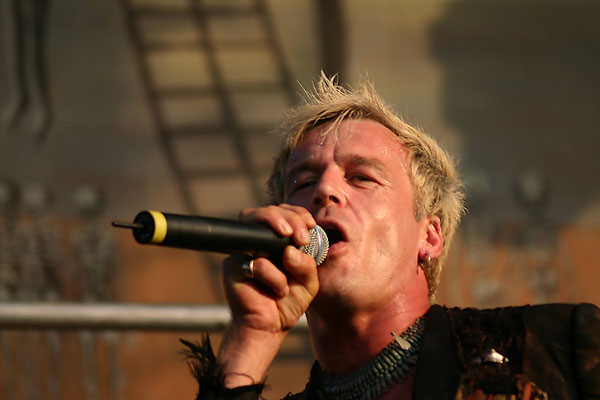
Singer Michael Robert Rhein a.k.a. "Das letzte Einhorn"

The band is known for drawing lyrics from poetry and music of the Middle Ages and Renaissance.

Many of the lyrics in the band's repertoire of medieval songs come from church writings (e.g., "Wessebronner Gebet"), Benedictine writings (e.g., "Raue See"), or are arrangements of traditional songs (e.g., "Merseburger Zaubersprüche", "Tannhuser", "Poc Vecem"). The band also frequently uses songs from the Carmina Burana, as well as the poetry of François Villon ("Rotes Haar" and "Erdbeermund"; translated into German by Paul Zech).

== Performance style and image ==
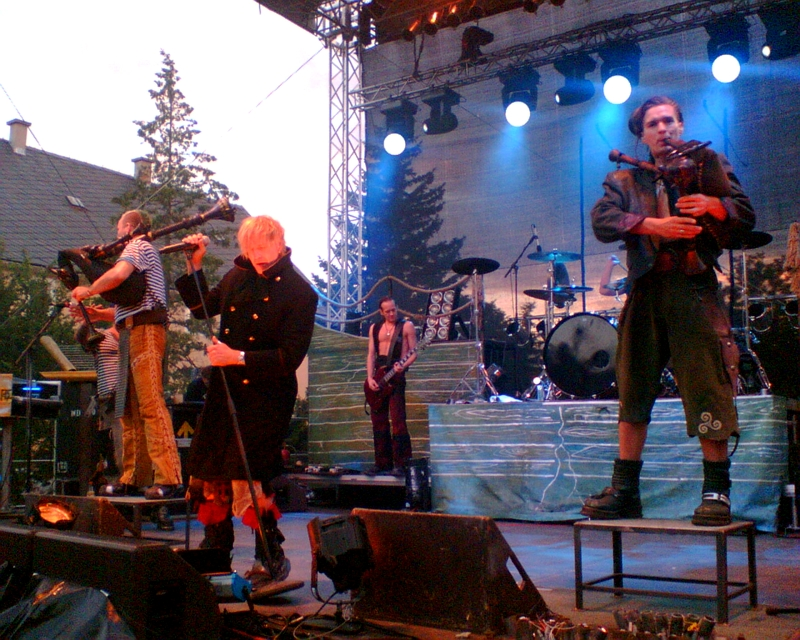
In Extremo on stage

In Extremo initially gained visibility through performances at medieval markets and historical venues, including castles.

They are known for their distinctive stage presentation, including medieval-inspired costumes and the use of pyrotechnics during concerts. One notable feature has been Der Morgenstern's use of cymbals set on fire during performances. These theatrical elements became a defining part of the band's live shows as its audience grew.

== Members ==
Current

- Michael Robert Rhein (Das letzte Einhorn/The Last Unicorn) – vocals, cittern, harp, darbuka, davul, binioù, guitar, piccolo, harmonica (1995–present)
- Marco Ernst-Felix Zorzytzky (Flex der Biegsame/Flex the Flexible) – German bagpipes, shawm, flute, uilleann pipes, hurdy-gurdy (1995–present)
- Kay Lutter (Die Lutter) – bass, marine trumpet, timpani (1995–present)
- André Strugala (Dr. Pymonte) – German bagpipes, shawm, flute, harp, marine trumpet, tsymbaly, sampler, FX (1996–present)
- Sebastian Oliver Lange (Van Lange) – guitar, cittern (1999–present)
- Florian Speckardt (Specki T.D.) – drums, percussion (2010–present)

Former

- Conny Fuchs (Die Rote Füchsin/The Red Fox) – German bagpipes (1995–1996)
- Mathias Aring (Sen Pusterbalg) – German bagpipes (1995–1997)
- Thomas Mund (Thomas der Münzer/Thomas the Coiner) – guitar (1995–1999)
- Reiner Morgenroth (Der Morgenstern/The Morning Star) – drums, percussion, timpani, frame drum (1995–2010)
- Boris Pfeiffer (Yellow Pfeiffer/Yellow Piper) – German bagpipes, shawm, flute, nyckelharpa (1997–2021); died 2022

Timeline

== Discography ==
=== Albums ===
Year	Title	Format	Meaning	Info
1997	In Extremo (Gold)	Studio		Medieval acoustic album
1998	Hameln	Studio	"Hamelin"	Medieval acoustic album
1998	Weckt die Toten!	Studio	"Wake the Dead"	Debut folk metal album
1998	Die Verrückten sind in der Stadt	Live	"The Madmen Are in Town"	Recorded live on 26 July at Runneburg (Germany)
1999	Verehrt und angespien	Studio	"Worshipped and Spat Upon"	Last album with guitarist Thomas Mund
2001	Sünder ohne Zügel	Studio	"Unbridled Sinners"	First album with guitarist Sebastian Oliver Lange
2002	Live 2002	Live		CD + DVD
2003	7	Studio		
2005	Mein rasend Herz	Studio	"My Raging Heart"	
2006	Raue Spree 2005	Live	"Rough Spree"	CD + DVD
2006	Kein Blick zurück	Best of	"No Looking Back"	Also contains two new songs and some rerecordings. The limited edition also featured a bonus disc with covers of In Extremo songs done by other bands.
2008	Sängerkrieg	Studio	"Singers' War"	
2008	Sängerkrieg Akustik Radio Show	Live	"Singers' War Acoustic Radio Show"	
2009	Am Goldenen Rhein	Live	"On the Golden Rhine"	CD + DVD. Last album with drummer Reiner Morgenroth.
2011	Sterneneisen	Studio	"Iron from the Stars"	First album with drummer Florian Speckardt.
2012	Sterneneisen Live – Laut sind wir und nicht die Leisen	Live	"Iron from the Stars Live – We Are Loud and Not the Quiet Ones"	Live in Siegen (21 April 2011). The DVD featured both this show and the one at Rock am Ring (5 June 2011).
2013	Kunstraub	Studio	"Art Theft"	
2015	20 wahre Jahre	Box set	"20 True Years"	Contains the band's material from 1997 to 2015
2016	Quid Pro Quo	Studio	"Give and Take"	
2017	40 wahre Lieder – The Best Of	Best of	"40 True Songs – The Best Of"	2 CDs (plus 3 DVDs on the special edition)
2020	Kompass zur Sonne	Studio	"Compass to the Sun"	
2024	Wolkenschieber	Studio	"Cloud Mover"	
2024	Wolkenschieber Live	Live	"Cloud Mover"	
2025	Wolkenschieber - Live Unter Dem Blutmond	Live	"Cloud Mover - Live Under the Blood Moon"	Includes live recording from December 7, 2024 at the Vienna Gasometer

=== Singles ===
- 1996: Ai vis lo lop (Occitan: Ai vist lo lop, "I Saw the Wolf") (cassette)
- 1997: In Extremo (Der Galgen)
- 1998: Ai vis lo lop Vocal-Remix
- 1999: This Corrosion (promo maxi CD)
- 1999: Merseburger Zaubersprüche ("Merseburg Incantations") (promo maxi CD)
- 2000: Vollmond ("Full Moon")
- 2001: Unter dem Meer ("Below the Sea") (promo maxi CD)
- 2001: Wind (promo maxi CD)
- 2003: Küss mich ("Kiss Me")
- 2003: Erdbeermund ("Strawberry Mouth")
- 2005: Nur ihr allein ("Only You Alone") – released in three versions
- 2005: Horizont ("Horizon")
- 2006: Liam (German version)
- 2008: Frei zu sein ("To Be Free")
- 2008: Neues Glück ("New Luck")
- 2011: Zigeunerskat ("Gypsy Skat")
- 2011: Siehst du das Licht ("Do You See the Light")
- 2011: Viva la vida ("Live Life")
- 2013: Feuertaufe ("Baptism by Fire")
- 2015: Loreley (20th Anniversary Song)
- 2016: Sternhagelvoll ("Blotto")
- 2020: Troja ("Troy")
- 2020: Wintermärchen ("Winter Fable")
- 2020: Schenk nochmal ein

=== Music videos ===
- This Corrosion (1999, directed by Stephan Vollmer)
- Vollmond (2000, directed by Heiner Thimm)
- Wind (2001, directed by Heiner Thimm)
- Küss mich (2003, directed by Uwe Flade)
- Erdbeermund (2003, directed by Uwe Flade)
- Nur ihr allein (2005, directed by Jörn Heitmann)
- Horizont (2005 or 2006, directed by David Incorvaia)
- Liam, official live music video (2006, directed by Uwe Flade)
- Frei zu sein (2008, directed by Sharon Berkal)
- Zigeunerskat (2011)
- Viva la vida (2011)
- Siehst du das Licht (2011)
- Feuertaufe (2013)
- Loreley (20th Anniversary Song) (2015)
- Sternhagelvoll (2016)
- Störtebeker (2016)
- Lieb Vaterland, magst ruhig sein (2016)
- Troja (2020)
- Kompass zur Sonne (2020)
- Schenk nochmal ein (2020)

=== Video games ===
- Gothic (2001, Windows): The band, recreated in the game, was shown to play the acoustic version of "Herr Mannelig" in-game during the second chapter. In the international English release, the scene was removed for licensing issues, even in the digital releases. A mod can restore the cameo.

=== Appearances ===
- "I Walk Alone" (Tarja), In Extremo Remix
- "Meridian" (Manntra), from the EP Meridian (2017) - featuring Michael Robert Rhein
- "Murter" (Manntra), from the album Oyka! (2019) - featuring Michael Robert Rhein

== See also ==
- Corvus Corax
