= Weckt die Toten! =

Studio album by In Extremo
- Released: 1 May 1998
- Length: 45:00
- Label: Metal Blade (US); Vertigo Berlin (2015 German reissue); Vielklang Musikproduktion
- Producer: Ekkehard Straub; VTRAX

In Extremo chronology
Hameln (1998)	Weckt die Toten! (1998)	Verehrt und angespien (1999)

Professional ratings
Review scores
Source	Rating
Rock Hard	9.5/10
AllMusic	3/5 stars

Weckt die Toten! ("Wake the Dead!") is a studio album by the German folk metal band In Extremo. It was released on 1 May 1998 through Vielklang Musikproduktion.

== Reception ==
In 2005, Weckt die Toten! was ranked number 391 in Rock Hard magazine's book The 500 Greatest Rock & Metal Albums of All Time.

== Track listing ==
No.	Title	Length
1.	"Ai Vis Lo Lop"	3:59
2.	"Stella Splendens"	1:18
3.	"Hiemali Tempore"	4:14
4.	"Rotes Haar"	5:02
5.	"Villeman og Magnhild"	3:44
6.	"Como Poden"	3:19
7.	"Palästinalied"	5:19
8.	"Vor vollen Schüsseln"	3:32
9.	"Maria Virgin"	4:56
10.	"Totus Floreo"	3:37
11.	"Der Galgen"	3:28
12.	"Two Søstra"	2:32

== Personnel ==
- Das Letzte Einhorn – vocals, cittern
- Dr. Pymonte – German bagpipes, shawm
- Flex der Biegsame – German bagpipes, shawm
- Yellow Pfeiffer – German bagpipes, shawm
- Thomas der Münzer – guitar
- Morgenstern – drums
- Die Lutter – bass
