= Cantus Buranus =

Studio album by Corvus Corax
- Released: August 8, 2005
- Genre: Medieval music Classical
- Length: 51:16
- Label: Roadrunner

Corvus Corax chronology
Best of Corvus Corax (2005)	Cantus Buranus (2005)	Cantus Buranus Live in Berlin (2006)

Cantus Buranus is an album by the German medieval revival band Corvus Corax that employs the medieval text Carmina Burana. Cantus Buranus is a stage opera of eleven poems from Carmina Burana for orchestra, choir and medieval instruments, incorporating medieval, classical and modern musical idioms. It is not the first time Corvus Corax has worked with Carmina Burana; the band Tanzwut (which is another Corvus Corax project) used the poems "Fautue" and "Caupona" in their album Ihr Wolltet Spass.

The Cantus Buranus CD was released August 8, 2005 by Roadrunner Records. A live recording in Berlin spawned a live album and DVD: Cantus Buranus - Live in Berlin.

== Track listing ==
1. "Fortuna" - 4:08
2. "Florent Omnes" - 5:44
3. "Dulcissima" - 4:58
4. "Lingua Mendax" - 4:59
5. "Rustica Puella" - 4:15
6. "Nummus" - 3:31
7. "Curritur" - 4:17
8. "Sol solo" - 4:21
9. "Venus" - 4:50
10. "O langueo" - 4:08
11. "Ergo Bibamus" - 5:58
