= Gimlie =

Studio album by Corvus Corax
- Released: November 15, 2013
- Genre: Neo-Medieval music
- Length: 55 mins
- Label: Behßmokum Records

Corvus Corax chronology
Sverker (2011)	Gimlie (2013)

Gimlie is a studio album by Neo-Medieval group Corvus Corax.

== Track listing ==
All songs by Castus Karsten Liehm and Norbert Norri Drescher except 'Twilight of the Thunder God' by Amon Amarth.

1. "Die Seherin (Intro)" - 1:40
2. "Gimlie" - 4:05
3. "Unicornis" - 4:01
4. "Der Schrei" - 3:52
5. "Koniginnen werden ihr neiden" - 3:39
6. "Derdriu" - 4:32
7. "Grendel" - 4:18
8. "Beowulf is min nama" - 4:29
9. "Sigeleasne sang" - 5:28
10. "Intro Crenaid brain" - 1:08
11. "Crenaid brain" - 5:07
12. "Twilight of the Thunder God" - 4:10
13. "Krummavisur" - 4:45
14. "Twilight of the Thunder God (Hymnus) - 3.47

== Credits ==
- Wim Dobbrisch - bagpipes, shawm, bucina, vocals
- Castus Karsten Liehm - bagpipes, shawn, bucina, sistrum, vocals
- Hatz - big frame drum, cymbals, cassa, vocals
- Norri Drescher - big frame drum, bass drum, string drum, tam tam, vocals
- PanPeter - bagpipes
- Vit Polak - bagpipes, vocals
- Steve the Machine - percussion
