= Kunstraub =

Studio album by In Extremo
- Released: 27 September 2013
- Length: 45:00
- Label: Principal Studios, Senden, Vertigo Records
- Producer: Jörg Umbreit, Vincent Sorg

In Extremo chronology
Sterneneisen Live – Laut sind wir und nicht die Leisen (2012)	Kunstraub (2013)	Quid Pro Quo (2016)

Kunstraub (German for "Art Theft") is a studio album by the German folk metal band In Extremo. It was released on 27 September 2013 by Vertigo Records.

== Track listing ==
No.	Title	Length
1.	"Der die Sonne schlafen schickt" ("The One Who Puts the Sun to Sleep")	3:56
2.	"Wege ohne Namen" ("Roads Without Name")	4:23
3.	"Lebemann" ("Man About Town")	3:22
4.	"Himmel und Hölle" ("Heaven and Hell")	3:56
5.	"Gaukler" ("Jugglers")	3:52
6.	"Kunstraub" ("Art Theft")	3:24
7.	"Feuertaufe" ("Baptism of Fire")	3:27
8.	"Du und ich" ("You and Me")	3:30
9.	"Doof" ("Fool")	3:50
10.	"Alles schon gesehen" ("Already Seen It All")	3:29
11.	"Belladonna"	4:01
12.	"Die Beute" ("The Booty")	3:42

Bonus tracks

No.	Title	Length
13.	"Bunter Vogel" ("Colorful Bird")	4:42
14.	"Meie Din" (Traditional ("meie dîn liehter schîn" by Neidhart von Reuental))	4:30
