= Götter auf Abruf =

Studio album by Letzte Instanz
- Released: September 22, 2003
- Recorded: Dresden
- Genre: Medieval metal, nu metal
- Length: 52:39
- Label: Andromeda (Soulfood Music)

Letzte Instanz chronology
Kalter Glanz (2001)	Götter auf Abruf (2003)	Ins Licht (2006)

Götter auf Abruf is the fourth album released by the German medieval metal/industrial rock band Letzte Instanz. This was the first album of Letzte Instanz to enter the German Media Control Charts, peaking at position 81.

The album features a mix of heavy guitar sounds and classical instruments, the latter being more reminiscent of Letze Instanz's early works than the previous release.

== Track listing ==
No.	Title	Length
1.	"Initium"	0:31
2.	"Salve Te"	3:50
3.	"Bittere Nacht"	3:44
4.	"Jeden Morgen"	4:22
5.	"Showtime"	4:02
6.	"Position im Kosmos"	3:51
7.	"Am Fluss"	4:06
8.	"Himmelfahrt"	4:17
9.	"Einbahnstraße"	5:01
10.	"Der letzte Schrei"	3:10
11.	"Sprachlos (Opus No. II)"	3:45
12.	"Spurlos"	4:36
13.	"Zwei Wege"	3:37
14.	"Der Kaiser"	3:40
15.	"Kopf oder Zahl" (Bonus Track)	3:01
