= Mein rasend Herz =

Studio album by In Extremo
- Released: 30 May 2005
- Genre: Medieval metal
- Length: 52:12
- Label: Universal (original release); Vertigo (2015 German reissue)

In Extremo chronology
Sieben (2003)	Mein rasend Herz (2005)	Raue Spree (2006)

Mein rasend Herz ("My Racing Heart") is a studio album by the German band In Extremo. It was released on 30 May 2005 through Universal Records and entered the German Media Control Charts at number 3, its eventual peak position. It was preceded by the singles "Nur ihr allein" (17 May), "Horizont" (12 September) and "Liam" (3 February) – all featured on this album. The limited-edition disc also features the German version of "Liam".

== Critical reception ==
Professional ratings
Review scores
Source	Rating
Rock Hard	9/10

In 2005, Mein rasend Herz was ranked number 327 in Rock Hard magazine's book The 500 Greatest Rock & Metal Albums of All Time.

== Track listing ==
No.	Title	Length
1.	"Raue See"	4:29
2.	"Horizont"	3:37
3.	"Wessebronner Gebet"	4:25
4.	"Nur ihr allein"	3:53
5.	"Fontaine la Jolie"	4:40
6.	"Macht und Dummheit"	4:10
7.	"Tannhuser"	3:12
8.	"Liam"	3:49
9.	"Rasend Herz"	4:05
10.	"Singapur"	3:53
11.	"Poc Vecem"	4:37
12.	"Spielmann"	3:31
13.	"Liam" (German version)	3:51

== Charts ==
Year	Chart	Position
2005	German Album Charts	3
2005	Top Swiss Albums	40
