= Ecce gratum =

Medieval Latin Goliardic poem

"Ecce gratum" (English: "Behold, the pleasant") is a medieval Latin Goliardic poem written early in the 13th century, part of the collection known as the Carmina Burana. It was set to music in 1935/36 by German composer Carl Orff as part of his Carmina Burana which premiered at Frankfurt Opera on 8 June 1937. Within Orff's Carmina Burana, this song is the 5th movement in section 1, Primo vere (In Spring).

== Lyrics ==
Ecce gratum
et optatum
Ver reducit gaudia,
purpuratum
floret pratum,
Sol serenat omnia.
Iamiam cedant tristia!
Estas redit,
nunc recedit
Hyemis sevitia. Ah!

Iam liquescit
et decrescit
grando, nix et cetera;
bruma fugit,
et iam sugit
Ver Estatis ubera;
illi mens est misera,
qui nec vivit
nec lascivit
sub Estatis dextera. Ah!

Gloriantur
et letantur
in melle dulcedinis,
qui conantur,
ut utantur
premio Cupidinis:
simus jussu Cypridis
gloriantes
et letantes
pares esse Paridis. Ah!

Behold, the pleasant
and longed-for
spring brings back joyfulness,
violet flowers
fill the meadows,
the sun brightens everything,
sadness is now at an end!
Summer returns,
now withdraw
the rigours of winter. Ah!

Now melts
and disappears
ice, snow and the rest,
winter flees,
and now spring sucks
at summer's breast:
a wretched soul is he
who does not live
or lust
under summer's rule. Ah!

They glory
and rejoice
in honeyed sweetness
who strive
to make use of
Cupid's prize;
at Venus' command
let us glory
and rejoice
in being Paris' equals. Ah!.
