= Labyrinth der Sinne =

Studio album by Tanzwut
- Released: 2000
- Recorded: 2000 Thommy Hein Tonstudios, Berlin, Germany
- Genre: Industrial rock, Medieval metal
- Length: 50:14
- Label: EMI Music
- Producer: Thommy Hein

Tanzwut chronology
Tanzwut (1999)	Labyrinth der Sinne (2000)	Ihr wolltet Spass (2003)

Labyrinth der Sinne is the second full-length studio album by German industrial rock/medieval metal band Tanzwut. It was released in 2000 through British record label EMI Music. The 2000 release included a CD and a Cassette. The album ranked #46 on the German Alternative Charts (DAC) Top Albums of 2000.

== Track listing ==
1. "Tanzwut" − 3:52
2. "Ekstase" − 3:39
3. "Lügner" − 4:37
4. "Bitte bitte" − 3:13 (Music and lyrics composed and written by Farin Urlaub; Die Ärzte cover)
5. "Labyrinth" − 3:07
6. "Niemals ohne dich" − 4:10
7. "Die Drohne" − 3:36
8. "Der Wächter" − 3:19 (Music and lyrics composed and written by Voyce)
9. "Dämmerung" − 3:32
10. "Was soll der Teufel im Paradies" − 4:10
11. "Gigolo" − 3:10
12. "Ikarus" − 3:59
13. "Götterfunken" − 5:50 (Producers: Ritchie Barton, Uwe Hassbecker)
  (Lyrics written by Johann Wolfgang von Goethe)
  (Original music composed by Ludwig van Beethoven)

== Credits ==
=== Band members ===
- Teufel − vocals
- Koll A. − bagpipes, flute (shawm)
- Castus − backing vocals, violin (hurdy-gurdy), bagpipes, flute (shawm)
- Wim − bagpipes, flute (shawm)
- Brandan − bass, bagpipes

=== Production ===
- All tracks produced and engineered at Thommy Hein Tonstudios, except track 13 produced and mixed at Danzmusik Studio (Berlin, Germany).
- Arranged by Ritchie Barton, Uwe Hassbecker
- Assistant engineer Sven Friedrich: (tracks: 1 to 12)
- Producer, engineer: Thommy Hein (tracks: 1 to 12)
- Music and lyrics composed and written by Themann (tracks: 2, 3, 5, 6, 9, 10) and Tyrus (tracks: 3, 5, 6, 9, 10)
