= Sverker (album) =

Studio album by Corvus Corax
- Released: November 25, 2011
- Genre: Neo-Medieval music
- Length: 51:14
- Label: Behßmokum Records

Corvus Corax chronology
Live in Berlin (2009)	Sverker (2011)	Gimlie (2013)

Sverker is a studio album by Neo-Medieval group Corvus Corax.

== Track listing ==
1. "Intro Gjallarhorni" - 0:58
2. "Gjallarhorni" - 2:59
3. "Sverker" - 4:31
4. "Fiach Dubh" - 6:38
5. "Trinkt vom Met" - 0:35
6. "The drinking loving dancers" - 5:19
7. "Lá í mBealtaine" - 4:47
8. "Havfrue" - 4:36
9. "Baldr" - 3:27
10. "Ragnarök" - 7:40
11. "Tjugundi bidil" - 0:27
12. "Na Láma-sa" - 9:18

== Credits ==
- Wim Dobbrisch - bagpipes, shawm, bucina, vocals
- Castus Karsten Liehm - bagpipes, shawn, bucina, sistrum, vocals
- Hatz - big frame drum, cymbals, cassa, vocals
- Norri Drescher - big frame drum, bass drum, string drum, tam tam, vocals
- PanPeter - bagpipes
- Vit - bagpipes
- Steve the machine - percussion
