= Carmina Burana =

Medieval manuscript of poems and dramatic texts

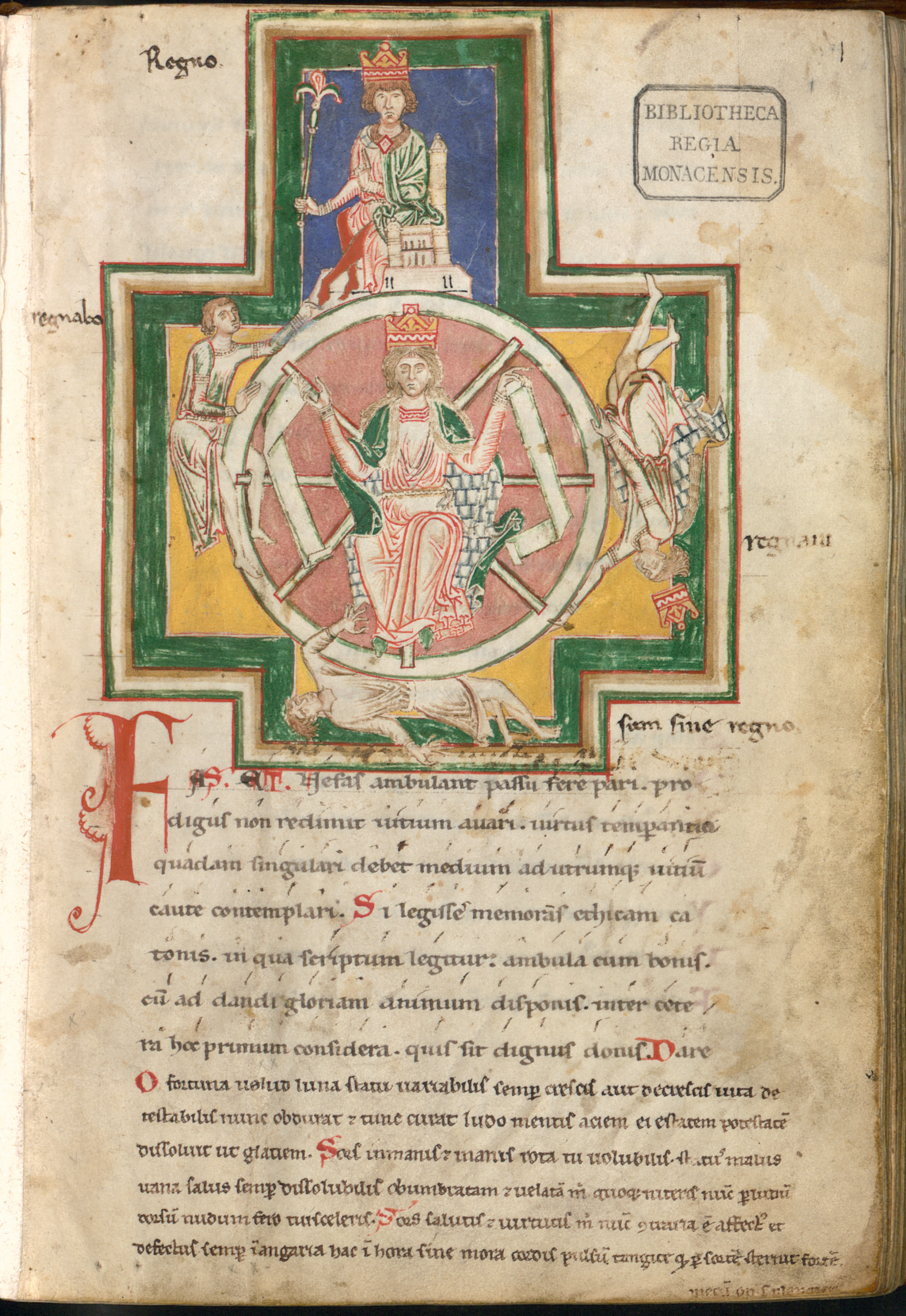
The Wheel of Fortune from Carmina Burana

Carmina Burana (/ˈkɑːrmɪnə bʊˈrɑːnə/, Latin for "Songs from Benediktbeuern" [Buria in Latin]) is a manuscript of 254 poems and dramatic texts mostly from the 11th or 12th century, although some are from the 13th century. The pieces are mostly bawdy, irreverent, and satirical. They were written principally in Medieval Latin, a few in Middle High German and old Arpitan. Some are macaronic, a mixture of Latin and German or French vernacular.

They were written by students and clergy when Latin was the lingua franca throughout Italy and western Europe for travelling scholars, universities, and theologians. Most of the poems and songs appear to be the work of Goliards, clergy (mostly students) who satirized the Catholic Church. The collection preserves the works of a number of poets, including Peter of Blois, Walter of Châtillon and an anonymous poet referred to as the Archpoet.

The collection was found in 1803 in the Benedictine monastery of Benediktbeuern, Bavaria, and is now housed in the Bavarian State Library in Munich. It is considered to be the most important collection of Goliard and vagabond songs, along with the Carmina Cantabrigiensia.

The manuscripts reflect an international European movement, with songs originating from Occitania, France, England, Scotland, Aragon, Castile and the Holy Roman Empire.

Twenty-four poems in Carmina Burana were set to music in 1936 by Carl Orff as Carmina Burana: Cantiones profanae cantoribus et choris cantandae comitantibus instrumentis atque imaginibus magicis. His composition quickly became popular and a staple piece of the classical music repertoire. The opening and closing movement "O Fortuna" has been used in numerous films, becoming one of the most recognizable compositions in popular culture.

== Manuscript ==
Carmina Burana (CB) is a manuscript written in 1230 by two different scribes in an early gothic minuscule on 119 sheets of parchment. A number of free pages, cut of a slightly different size, were attached at the end of the text in the 14th century. At some point in the Late Middle Ages, the handwritten pages were bound into a small folder called the Codex Buranus. However, in the process of binding, the text was placed partially out of order, and some pages were most likely lost as well. The manuscript contains eight miniatures: the rota fortunae (which actually is an illustration from songs CB 14–18, but was placed by the book binder as the cover), an imaginative forest, a pair of lovers, scenes from the story of Dido and Aeneas, a scene of drinking beer, and three scenes of playing dice, tables, and chess.

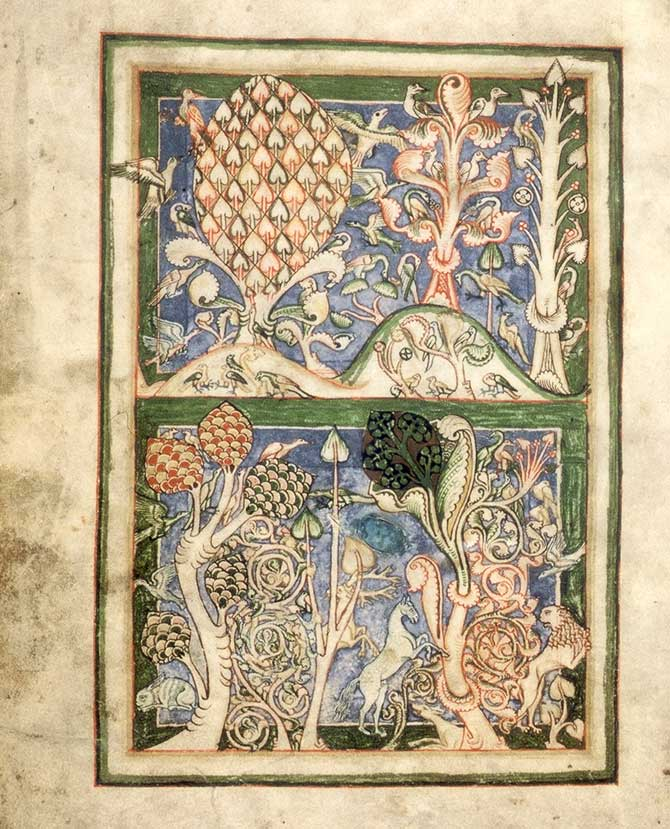
The Forest, from the Carmina Burana

=== History ===
Older research assumed that the manuscript was written in Benediktbeuern where it was found. Today, however, Carmina Burana scholars have several different ideas about the manuscript's place of origin. It is agreed that the manuscript must be from the region of central Europe where the Bavarian dialect of German is spoken due to the Middle High German phrases in the text—a region that includes parts of southern Germany, western Austria, and northern Italy. It must also be from the southern part of that region because of the Italian peculiarities of the text. The two possible locations of its origin are the bishop's seat of Seckau in Styria and Neustift Abbey near Brixen in South Tyrol.

A bishop named Heinrich was provost in Seckau from 1232 to 1243, and he is mentioned as provost of Maria Saal in Carinthia in CB 6* of the added folio. This would support Seckau as the possible point of origin, and it is possible that Heinrich funded the creation of the Carmina Burana. The marchiones (people from Steiermark) were mentioned in CB 219,3 before the Bavarians, Saxons, or Austrians, presumably indicating that Steiermark was the location closest to the writers. Many of the hymns were dedicated to Saint Catherine of Alexandria, who was venerated in Seckau, such as CB 12* and 19*–22*.

In support of Kloster Neustift, the text's open-mindedness is characteristic of the reform-minded Augustine Canons Regular of the time, as is the spoken quality of the writing. Also, Brixen is mentioned in CB 95, and the beginning to a story appears in CB 203a which is unique to Tirol called the Eckenlied about the mythic hero Dietrich von Bern.

It is less clear how the Carmina Burana traveled to Benediktbeuern. Fritz Peter Knapp suggested that the manuscript could have traveled in 1350 by way of the Wittelsbacher family who were Vögte of both Tirol and Bavaria, if it was written in Neustift.

=== Themes ===
Generally, the works contained in the Carmina Burana can be arranged into four groups according to theme:

1. 55 songs of morals and mockery (CB 1–55)
2. 131 love songs (CB 56–186)
3. 40 drinking and gaming songs (CB 187–226)
4. two longer spiritual theater pieces (CB 227 and 228)

This outline, however, has many exceptions. CB 122–134, which are categorized as love songs, actually are not: they contain a song for mourning the dead, a satire, and two educational stories about the names of animals. Another group of spiritual poems may have been included in the Carmina Burana and since lost. The attached folio contains a mix of 21 generally spiritual songs: a prose-prayer to Saint Erasmus and four more spiritual plays, some of which have only survived as fragments. These larger thematic groups can also be further subdivided, for example, the end of the world (CB 24–31), songs about the crusades (CB 46–52) or reworkings of writings from antiquity (CB 97–102).

Other frequently recurring themes include: critiques of simony and greed in the church, that, with the advent of the monetary economy in the 12th century, rapidly became an important issue (CB 1–11, 39, 41–45); lamentations in the form of the planctus, for example about the ebb and flow of human fate (CB 14–18) or about death (CB 122–131); the hymnic celebration of the return of spring (CB 132, 135, 137, 138, 161 and others); pastourelles about the rape/seduction of shepherdesses by knights, students/clergymen (CB 79, 90, 157–158); and the description of love as military service (CB 60, 62, and 166), a topos known from Ovid's elegiac love poems. Ovid and especially his erotic elegies were reproduced, imitated and exaggerated in the Carmina Burana. Following Ovid, depictions of sexual intercourse in the manuscript are frank and sometimes aggressive. CB 76, for example, makes use of the first-person narrative to describe a ten-hour love act with the goddess of love herself, Venus.

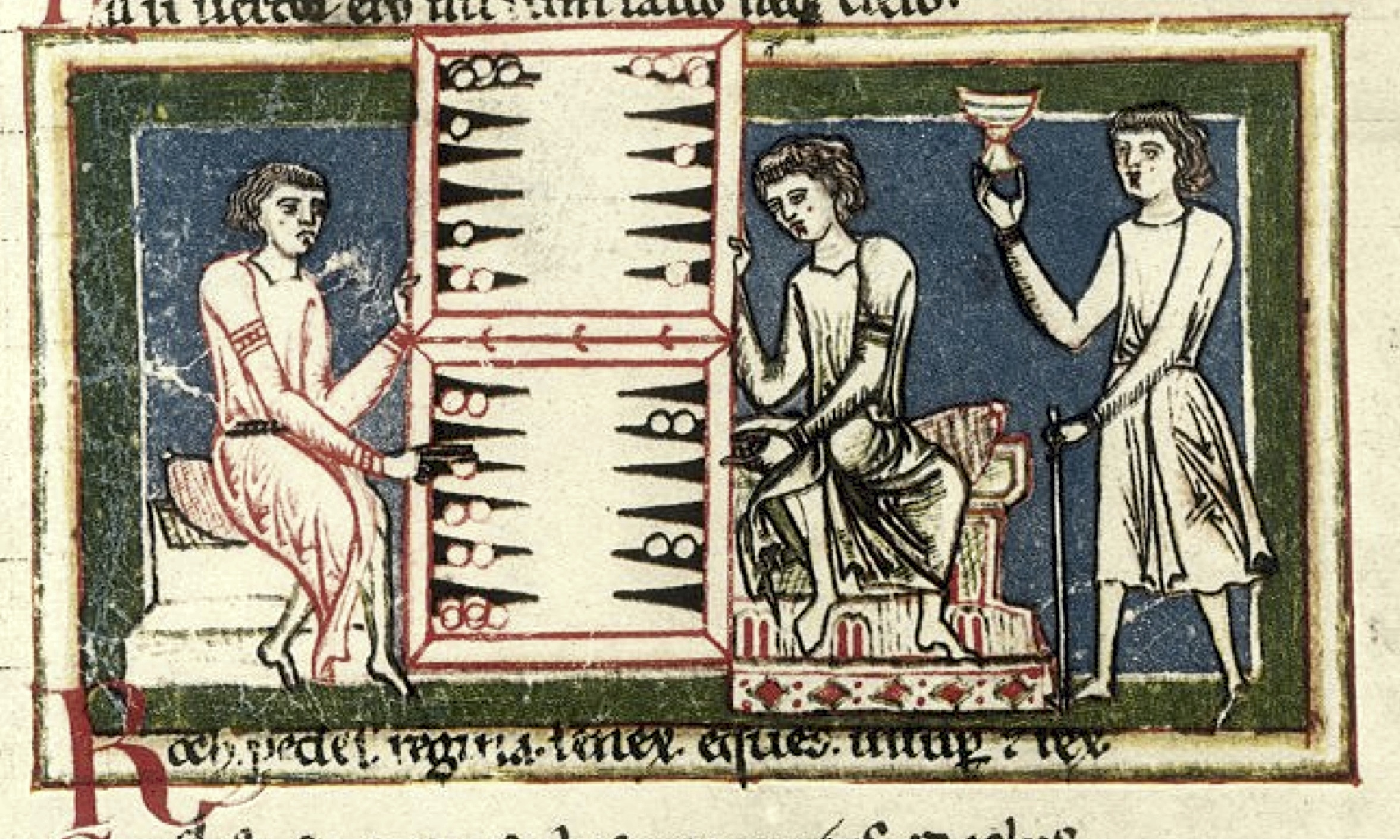
Tables players, from the Carmina Burana

The Carmina Burana contains numerous poetic descriptions of a raucous medieval paradise (CB 195–207, 211, 217, 219), for which the ancient Greek philosopher Epicurus, known for his advocation of the blissful life, is even taken as an authority on the subject (CB 211). CB 219 describes, for example, an ordo vagorum (vagrant order) to which people from every land and clerics of all rankings were invited—even presbyter cum sua matrona, or "a priest with his lady wife" (humorous because Catholic priests must swear an oath of celibacy). CB 215 even provides an example of the religious rites of this order, the Officium lusorum, the "Service", or "Mass", "of the Gamblers". In this parody world, the rules of priesthood include sleeping in, eating heavy food and drinking rich wine, and regularly playing dice games. These rules were described in such detail that older research on the Carmina Burana took these descriptions literally and assumed there actually existed such a lazy order of priests. In fact, though, this outspoken reverie of living delights and freedom from moral obligations shows "an attitude towards life and the world that stands in stark contrast to the firmly established expectations of life in the Middle Ages". The literary researcher Christine Kasper considers this description of a bawdy paradise as part of the early history of the European story of the land of Cockaigne: in CB 222 the abbas Cucaniensis, or Abbot of Cockaigne, is said to have presided over a group of dice players.

=== Authors ===
Almost nothing is known about the authors of the Carmina Burana. Only a few songs can be ascribed to specific authors, such as those by Hugh Primas of Orléans (died c. 1160), by the Archpoet (died c. 1165), by Frenchman Walter of Châtillon (died c. 1201), and by Breton Petrus Blesensis (died c. 1203). Additionally, the attached folio contains German stanzas that mention specific authors, so they can be ascribed to German Minnesinger Dietmar von Aist (died c. 1170), to Heinrich von Morungen (died c. 1222), to Walther von der Vogelweide (died c. 1228), and to Neidhart (died c. 1240). The only signed poems are contained in the attached folio, and they are by the so-called Marner, a wandering poet and singer from Swabia. Many poems stem from works written in Classical antiquity by Ovid, Horace, Juvenal, and Ausonius; however, about two-thirds of the poems appear not to be derivative works.

The text is mostly an anonymous work, and it appears to have been written by Goliards and vagrants who were either theology students travelling between universities or clerics who had not yet received a prebendary. Presumably these individuals scrounged and begged for a living, which might explain why a good portion of the moral songs are dedicated to condemning those who are not generous alms givers (e.g., CB 3, 9, 11, and 19–21). The authors demonstrate a broad knowledge of ancient mythology, which they employ to rich effect through metonymy and allegorical references, and which they effortlessly weave into scenes from the Bible. Lyaeus, for example, the mythical god of wine (Dionysus), casually makes an appearance at the Marriage at Cana in CB 194 where Jesus performed the miracle of transforming water into wine (John 2:1–12).

== Rediscovery and history of publication ==
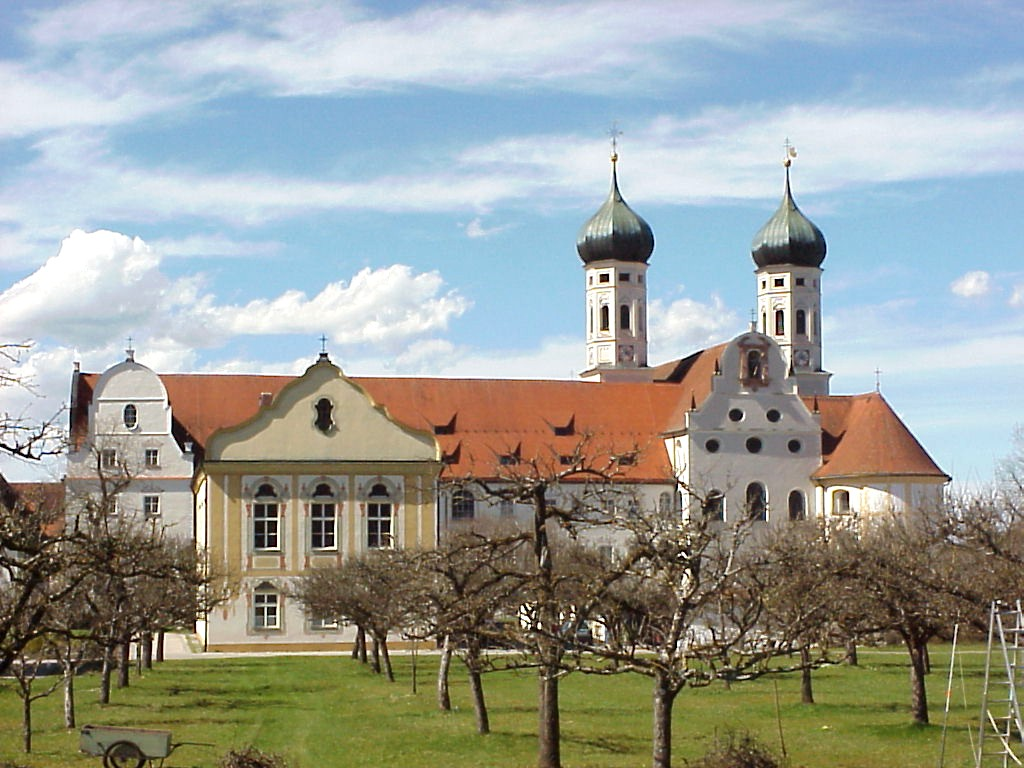
Benediktbeuern Abbey

The manuscript was discovered in the monastery at Benediktbeuern in 1803 by librarian Johann Christoph von Aretin. He transferred it to the Bavarian State Library in Munich where it currently resides (Signatur: clm 4660/4660a). Aretin regarded the Codex as his personal reading material, and wrote to a friend that he was glad to have discovered "a collection of poetic and prosaic satire, directed mostly against the papal seat".

The first pieces to be published were Middle-High German texts, which Aretin's colleague Bernhard Joseph Docen published in 1806. Additional pieces were eventually published by Jacob Grimm in 1844. The first collected edition of the Carmina Burana was not published until 1847, almost 40 years after Aretin's discovery. Publisher Johann Andreas Schmeller chose a misleading title for the collection, which created the misconception that the works contained in the Codex Buranas were not from Benediktbeuern. Schmeller attempted to organize the collection into "joking" (Scherz) and "serious" (Ernst) works, but he never fully completed the task. The ordering scheme used today was proposed in 1930 by Alfons Hilka and Otto Schumann in the first critical text edition of the Carmina Burana. The two based their edition on previous work by Munich philologist Wilhelm Meyer, who discovered that some pages of the Codex Buranus had mistakenly been bound into other old books. He also was able to revise illegible portions of the text by comparing them to similar works.

== Musical settings ==
About one-quarter of the poems in the Carmina Burana are accompanied in the manuscript by music using unheighted, staffless neumes, an archaic system of musical notation that by the time of the manuscript had largely been superseded by staffed neumes. Unheighted neumes only indicate whether a given note is pitched higher or lower than the preceding note, without giving any indication of how much change in pitch there is between two notes, so they are useful only as mnemonic devices for singers who are already familiar with the melody. However, it is possible to identify many of those melodies by comparing them with melodies notated in staffed neumes in other contemporary manuscripts from the schools of Notre Dame and Saint Martial.

Between 1935 and 1936, German composer Carl Orff composed music, also called Carmina Burana, for 24 of the poems. The single song "O Fortuna" (the Roman goddess of luck and fate), from the movement "Fortuna Imperatrix Mundi", is often heard in many popular settings such as films. Orff's composition has been performed by many ensembles. Other musical settings include:

- 1584: A sanitized version of "Tempus adest floridum" was published in the Finnish collection Piae Cantiones. The Piae Cantiones version includes a melody recognizable to modern audiences as the one that is now used for the Christmas carol "Good King Wenceslas".
- 1975–1978: The Clemencic Consort recorded in 1974–1977 five LPs of songs from Carmina Burana.
- 1983: The album Carmina Burana by Ray Manzarek, keyboard player for The Doors, produced by Philip Glass and Kurt Munkacsi; arrangements by Ray Manzarek. A&M Records.
- 1991: Apotheosis, a techno group from Belgium, produced their first single, "O Fortuna", in 1991, which heavily sampled the classical piece originally composed by Carl Orff. However, the estate of Carl Orff (who died in 1982) took legal action in court to stop the distribution of the records on the grounds of copyright infringement. Judgment was finally accorded to the estate.
- 1997: Japanese composer Nobuo Uematsu used portions of "O Fortuna", "Estuans interius", "Veni, veni, venias", and "Ave formosissima" for the final boss theme "One-Winged Angel" in Square Enix's game Final Fantasy VII.
- 1998: Composer John Paul used a portion of the lyrics of "Fas et nefas ambulant" in the musical score of the video game Gauntlet Legends.
- 2005: German band Corvus Corax recorded Cantus Buranus, a full-length opera, set to the original Carmina Burana manuscript in 2005, and released Cantus Buranus II in 2008
- 2009: The Trans-Siberian Orchestra included the song "Carmina Burana" on their album Night Castle.

== Recordings ==
- 1964, 1967 – Carmina Burana – Studio der frühen Musik, dir. Thomas Binkley (Teldec, 2 CD)
- 1968 – Carmina Burana – Capella Antiqua München, dir. Konrad Ruhland (Christophorus)
- 1974 – Carmina Burana (Orff) - Cleveland Orchestra, dir. Michael Tilson Thomas; Judith Blegen, soprano; Kenneth Riegel, tenor; Peter Binder Baritone (CBS Records Masterworks)
- 1975 - Carmina Burana (Orff) - London Symphony Orchestra and Chorus, dir. Andre Previn; Sheila Armstrong, soprano; Gerald English, tenor; Thomas Allen, baritone; St. Clement Danes Grammar School Boy’s Choir (EMI Classics)
- 1975–1978 – Carmina Burana – Clemencic Consort, dir. René Clemencic (5 LP recorded in 1974–1977 / 3 CD reissue, 1990, Harmonia Mundi France)
- 1983 – Carmina Burana; Das Grosse Passionspiel – Das Mittelalter Ensemble der Schola Cantorum Basiliensis, dir. Thomas Binkley (Deutsche Harmonia mundi, 2 CD)
- 1988 – Carmina Burana – Madrigalisti di Genova, dir. Leopoldo Gamberini (Ars Nova, LP)
- 1990 – Carmina Burana; Le Grand Mystère de la Passion – Ensemble Organum, dir. Marcel Pérès (Harmonia Mundi, 2 CD)
- 1992 – Satires, Desires and Excesses; Songs from Carmina Burana – New Orleans Musica da Camera, dir. Milton G. Scheuermann (Centaur)
- 1994 – Carmina Burana – New London Consort, dir. Philip Pickett (L'Oiseau Lyre, 4 CD released in 1987 (Vol. I), 1988 (Vol. II), 1989 (Vols III & IV))
- 1996 – Carmina Burana; Poetry & Music – Boston Camerata, dir. Joel Cohen (Erato)
- 1997 – Carmina Burana; Medieval Poems and Songs – Ensemble Unicorn, dir. Michael Posch + Ensemble Oni Wytars, dir. Marco Ambrosini (Naxos)
- 1998 – Carmina Burana – Modo Antiquo, dir. Bettina Hoffmann (Paragon-Amadeus 2 CD)
- 2008 – Carmina Burana; Medieval Songs from the Codex Buranus – Clemencic Consort, dir. René Clemencic (Oehms)
- 2025 - Carmina Burana; Alexander Liebreich conducts Orquesta de València (Accentus Music)

== See also ==
- Drinkers Mass
- Ecce gratum, CB 143
- Cantigas de escárnio e maldizer
- Medieval poetry
