= Cantus Buranus II =

Studio album by Corvus Corax
- Released: August 1, 2008
- Genres: Neo-Medieval music Classical music
- Label: Pica Music

Corvus Corax chronology
Kaltenberg anno MMVII (2007)	Cantus Buranus II (2008)

Cantus Buranus II is a studio album by Neo-Medieval band Corvus Corax.

== Track listing ==
1. "Veritas Simplex" - 8:30
2. "Miser" - 5:20
3. "Custodes Sunt Raptores" - 6:09
4. "De Mundi Statu" - 4:58
5. "Ordu Languet" - 5:55
6. "Vitium In Opere" - 6:18
7. "Quid Agam" - 5:50
8. "Causa Ludi" - 4:16
9. "Ingordin Et Ingordan" - 6:16
10. "Magnum Detrimentum" - 4:52
11. "In Orbem Universum" - 5:32
12. "O Varium Fortune" - 5:51
13. "Chou Chou Sheng - Preces Ad Imperatorem (bonus track)" - 7:05

== Notes ==
- All lyrics by Cantus Buranus.
- Recorded at Pica Music Studios and studio of Deutsches Filmorchester Babelsberg.
