= Tanzwut =

German Medieval metal band

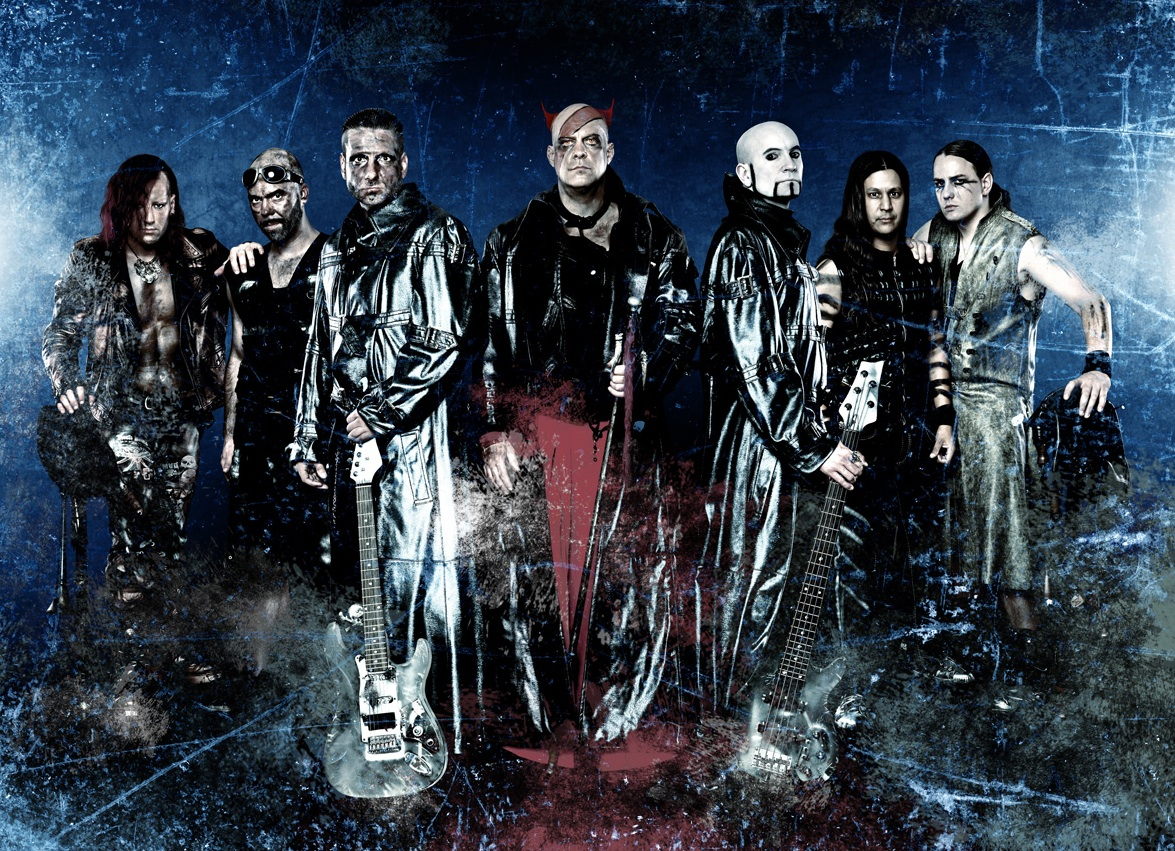
- Tanzwut in 2015

Background information
- Origin: Berlin, Germany
- Genres: Medieval metal; Neue Deutsche Härte
- Years active: 1998–present
- Labels: PICA, EMI, Teufel
- Members: Mike "Teufel" Paulenz; Martin Ukrasvan; Der Zwilling; Shumon; Ardor; Thrymr; Jackbird
- Past members: Koll. A. Brandan; Tec; Patrick; Jordon
- Website: tanzwut.com

Tanzwut (German pronunciation: [ˈtantsvuːt]) is a German Medieval metal and Neue Deutsche Härte band that originated as a side project of Corvus Corax members. The band uses a Medieval theme during their live performances which are expressed through their stagecraft, costumes and choreography.

Their name is the German term for "dancing mania", but is directly translated with "dance rage". Tanzwut are known for their heavy use of bagpipes, an unusual instrument for a metal band. The group has achieved international success, filling concert halls as far away from their home country as Mexico.

Since Ihr wolltet Spass, the band gravitated towards a more industrial metal approach, incorporating the use of more down-tuned guitars, harsher vocals and darker atmospheres. On Weiße Nächte ("White Nights") though, Tanzwut completely removed its industrial sound for a more refined classical approach centered around bagpipes with a heavy metal sound. However, some of the industrial influence returned with Höllenfahrt ("Hell Ride") and the band have written material in a more traditional style similar to that of Corvus Corax (Morus et Diabolus and Eselsmesse).

== Band members ==
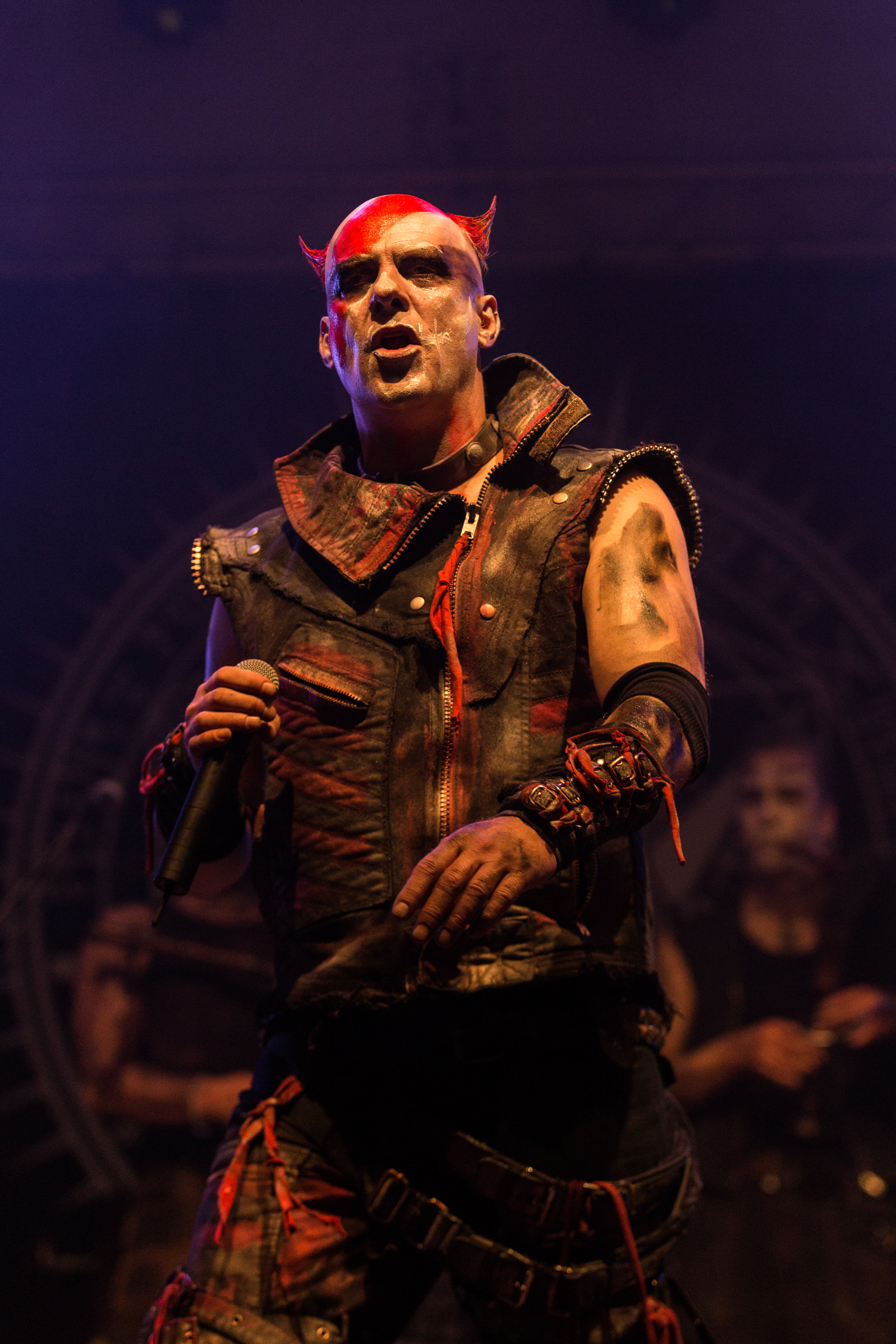
Singer Teufel at the Wave-Gotik-Treffen 2017

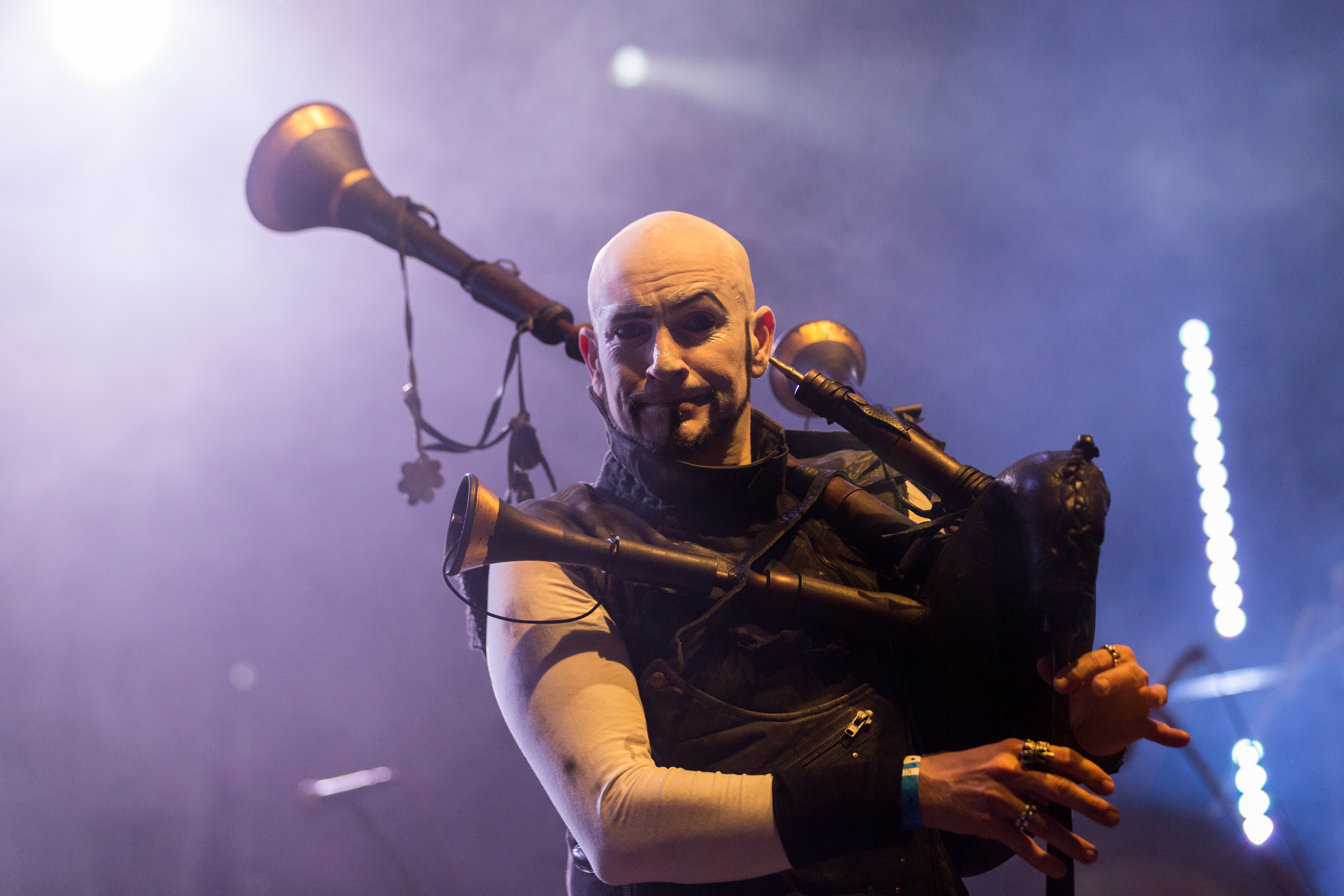
Der Zwilling at the Wave-Gotik-Treffen 2017

- Mike "Teufel" Paulenz – bagpipe, lead vocals
- Der Zwilling – bass, bagpipe
- Thrymr – bagpipe, shawm
- Pyro – bagpipe, shawm
- Shumon – percussion, keyboard
- Oually – percussion, key drum, electronic drums, riesentara, keyboard
- Martin Ukrasvan – guitar, backing vocals, bagpipe, tromba marina

=== Former members ===
- Koll. A. (a.k.a. "Meister Selbstfried") – bagpipe, shawm, cornett
- Brandan – guitar, bagpipe
- Tec – keyboard, programming
- Wim – bass guitar, bagpipe
- Patrick – electric guitar
- Castus – bagpipe, shawm
- Ardor – bagpipe, shawm
- Gast – keyboard, drum machine
- Norri – drums, percussion
- Hatz – keyboard, electronic drums
- Jordon – bagpipe, shawm

== Discography ==
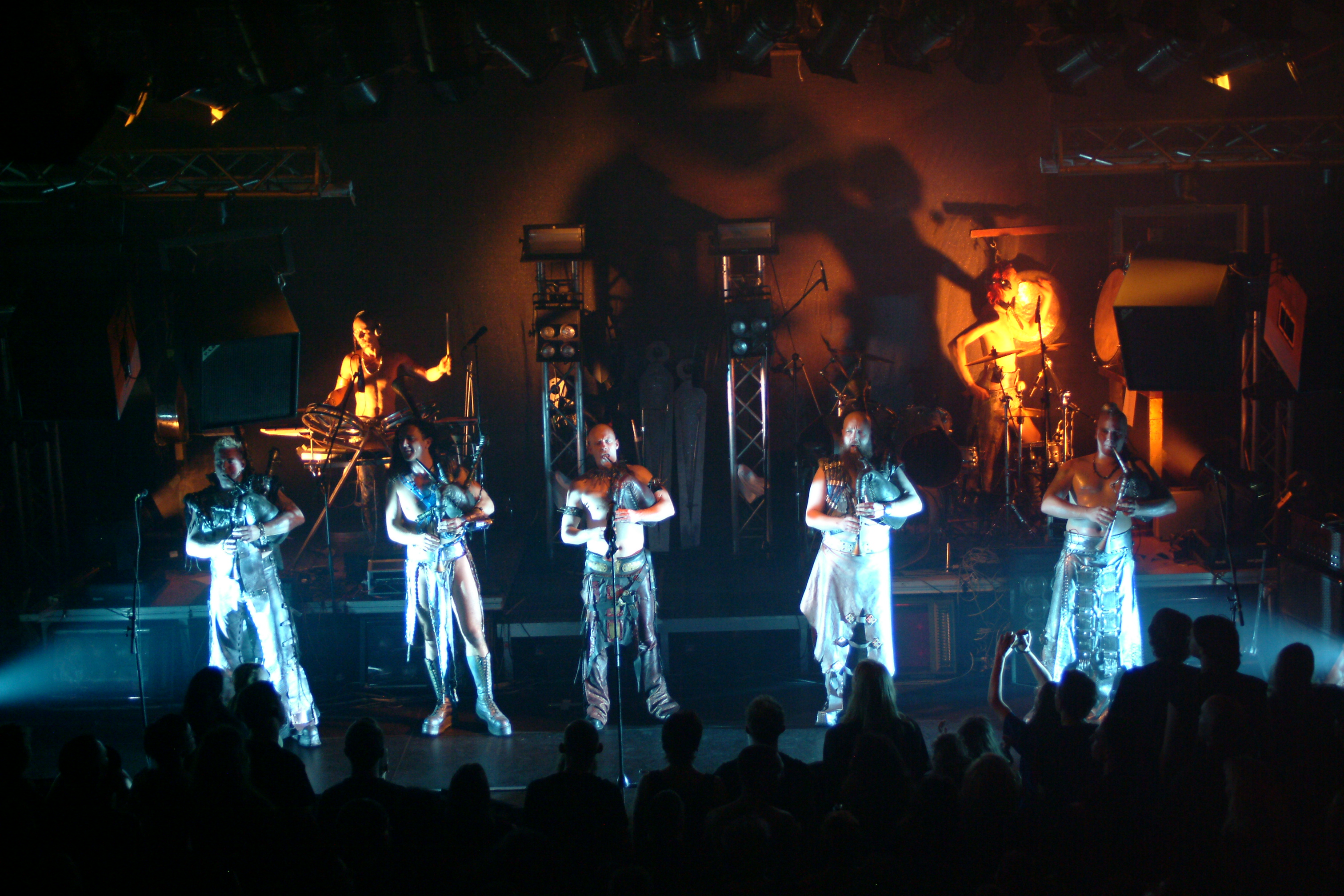
Tanzwut in 2004

=== Studio albums ===
- Tanzwut ("Dance Rage") (1999)
- Labyrinth der Sinne ("Labyrinth of Senses") (2000) – #43 DAC Top Albums of 2000, Germany
- Ihr wolltet Spass ("You Wanted Fun") (2003)
- Schattenreiter ("Shadow Rider") (2006)
- Weiße Nächte ("White Nights") (2011)
- Morus et Diabolus (2011)
- Höllenfahrt ("Hell Ride") (2013)
- Eselsmesse ("Donkey Fair") (2014)
- Freitag der 13. ("Friday the 13th") (2015)
- Schreib es mit Blut ("Write It in Blood") (2016)
- Seemannsgarn ("Sailor's Yarn") (2019)
- Die Tanzwut kehrt zurück (2021)
- Silberne Hochzeit (2023)
- Achtung, Mensch! (2024)
- Herz aus Stein (2026)

=== Live albums ===
- Tanzwut – Live (DVD, 2004)

=== Singles ===
- "Exkremento" (album, 1998) (promo)
- "Augen zu" ("Eyes Closed") (1999)
- "Weinst du?" ("Are You Crying?") (feat. Umbra et Imago) (1999)
- "Verrückt" ("Insane") (1999)
- "Tanzwut" ("Dance Rage") (2000)
- "Bitte bitte" ("Please Please") (2000) (Die Ärzte cover)
- "Eiserne Hochzeit" ("Iron Wedding") (2001)
- "Götterfunken" ("God-descended") (2001)
- "Feuer und Licht" (feat. Umbra et Imago) ("Fire and Light") (2001)
- "Nein nein" ("No No") (2003) (promo)
- "Meer" ("Sea") (2003)
- "Hymnus Cantica" (2003)
- "Immer noch wach" ("Still Awake") (feat. Schandmaul) (2005)
- "Weiße Nächte" ("White Nights") (2011)
- "Das Gerücht" ("The Rumor") (2013)
- "Der Himmel brennt" ("The Sky Is Burning") (2013)
- "Unsere Nacht" ("Our Night") (2014)
- "Der Eselskönig" ("The Donkey King") (feat. Entr'Act) (2014)
- "Freitag der 13." ("Friday the 13th") (2015)
- "Stille Wasser" ("Silent Waters") (feat. Liv Kristine) (2016)
