= Tanzwut (album) =

Studio album by Tanzwut
- Released: 1 March 1999
- Studio: Dierks Studios, Pulheim Stommeln, Germany
- Genre: Industrial rock, Medieval metal
- Length: 48:53
- Label: EMI Music
- Producer: Jon Caffery

Tanzwut chronology
Exkremento (1998)	Tanzwut (1999)	Labyrinth der Sinne (2000)

Tanzwut is the first full-length studio album by the German industrial rock/medieval metal band Tanzwut. It was released on 1 March 1999 through British record label EMI Music. The album was released in a standard CD format, a digipack format and a cassette format.

== Track listing ==
1. "Exkremento" − 3:42
2. "Im Rausch" − 3:43
3. "Königreich" − 4:10 (Saskia von Klitzing − drums)
4. "Das Schicksal" − 4:08
5. "Verrückt" (album version) − 3:53
6. "Augen zu" − 4:10 (Saskia von Klitzing − drums, Monique Maasen − vocals)
7. "Auferstehung" − 5:27 (Mediæval Bæbes − vocals)
8. "Eisenmann" − 5:35 (Music and lyrics written and composed by Bill Ward, Geezer Butler, Ozzy Osbourne, Tony Iommi)
9. "Erinnerung" − 3:52
10. "Die Balz" − 4:09
11. "Komm her" − 6:04

== Personnel ==
=== Band ===
- Teufel − vocals
- Koll A. − bagpipes, flute (shawm)
- Castus − backing vocals, violin (hurdy-gurdy), bagpipes, flute (shawm)
- Wim − bagpipes, flute (shawm)
- Brandan − bass, bagpipes

=== Other ===
- Assistant producer - Chris Gardiner
- Programmed by Tec (track 4)
- Music and lyrics composed and written by Tanzwut (tracks 1–7 and 9–11).
- Choir of "Auferstehung" recorded at Master Rock Studios, London.
- Mastered at Skyline Studios, Düsseldorf, Germany.
- The lyrics of "Eisenmann" translated into German by Tanzwut.
