= Marktsackpfeife =

Bagpipe developed in East Germany in 1980s

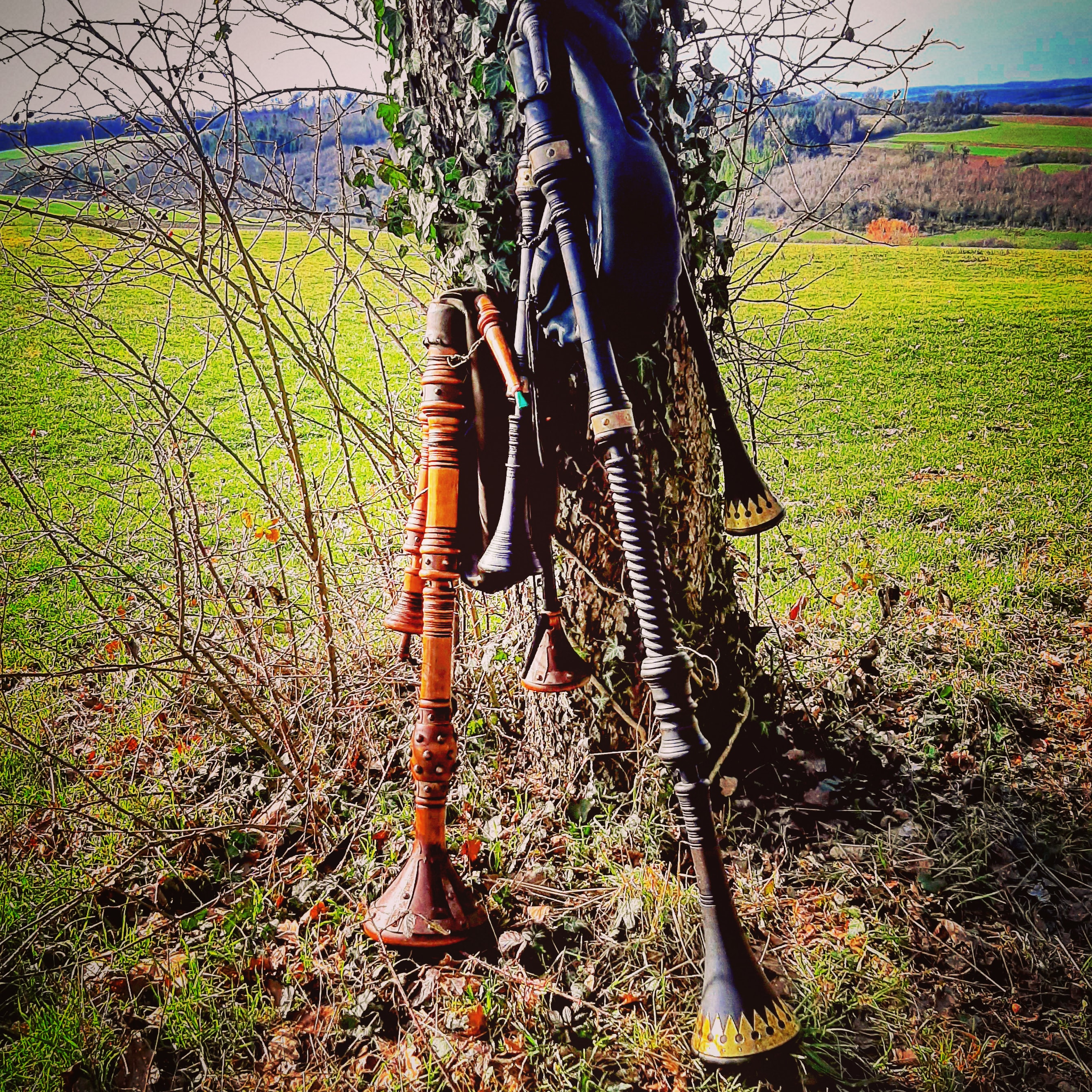
Two sets of Marktsackpfeifen

The term Marktsackpfeife (MSP lit. 'market bagpipes', also known as "German pipes") commonly refers to a type of bagpipe which has been developed in East Germany at the beginning of 1980s for the specific purpose to be played at faires and markets as a modern interpretation of a certain type of Medieval bapipes. Depictions of such bagpipes are found in Medieval sources and are characterized by specific features like wide flaring bells atop the chanter and drones, apparent conical shape of the chanter and reportedly substantial volume of their sound. Since no actual chanters of this type of bagpipe have survived and/or have been recovered so far, the MSP has to be classified as a purely modern musical instrument having a historically informed exterior. MSP chanters typically use double reeds made of plastic or Arundo donax cane and drones usually work with single reeds made of same materials. Chanter bores are conical with a pronounced flare at the end as they transition into the bell.

== Origin and Development ==
First attempts to reconstruct bagpipes from Middle Ages were already made in 1970s in West Germany, the only type of source, however, was Medieval art and written descriptions with no physical examples to study and copy. The type of bagpipe, which would gradually evolve into MSP, was made by the pipe maker Klaus Stecker and old music enthusiast Roman Streisand in early 1980s East Germany, who wanted to create a bagpipe which was at least comparable in its overall volume with the Great Highland Bagpipe.

During their collaboration, Mr. Stecker built and gave Mr. Streisand several shawms tuned in F, several modifications took place and the pitch of those chanters was gradually raised; F sharp to G and finally to A. The ability to play in Dorian and/or Aeolian mode was originally dictated by the historical source material played by Mr. Streisand and his colleagues at that time. This kind of tuning and mode have proven themselves very successful within the next decade and have been regarded as standard ever since.

== Tuning ==
The MSP has seven finger-holes in the front, one thumb hole in the rear. It features a range from one whole tone lower than the tonic (A = 440Hz) to one octave above it. The nine notes of the chanter scale are g‘, a‘, b‘, c‘‘, d‘‘, e‘‘, f#, g‘‘, a‘‘. The chanter, therefore, plays in A Dorian and uses the standard German fingering system, also known as "open fingering". Just intonation is favoured by most makers, although Pythagorean tuning and Equal temperament are also used.

tone	deviation from Equal Temperament (in cent)
g'	−4
a'	0
b'	+4
c"	+16
d"	−2
e"	+2
f#"	−16
g"	−4
a"	0

Depending on reed type and manufacturer, a wide range of chromatic semitones via fork/cross fingering can be achieved, a functional method to generate an f‘‘ instead of f#‘‘ can be regarded as standard among nearly all types of MSP which are tuned in A. Also, many manufacturers build MSP chanters which are able to generate semitones like c#‘‘, g#‘‘ and d#‘‘.

tone	deviation from Equal Temperament (in cent)
c#"	−14
d#"	−10
f"	+14
g#"	−12

If all of the aforementioned semitones can be produced, the following scales, in addition to A Dorian, can be played on the MSP.

- ACDEG (pentatonic)
- A major
- A minor
- A Mixolydian
- A Lydian

Besides that, parts of D major, D minor and E minor are also available.

== Music ==
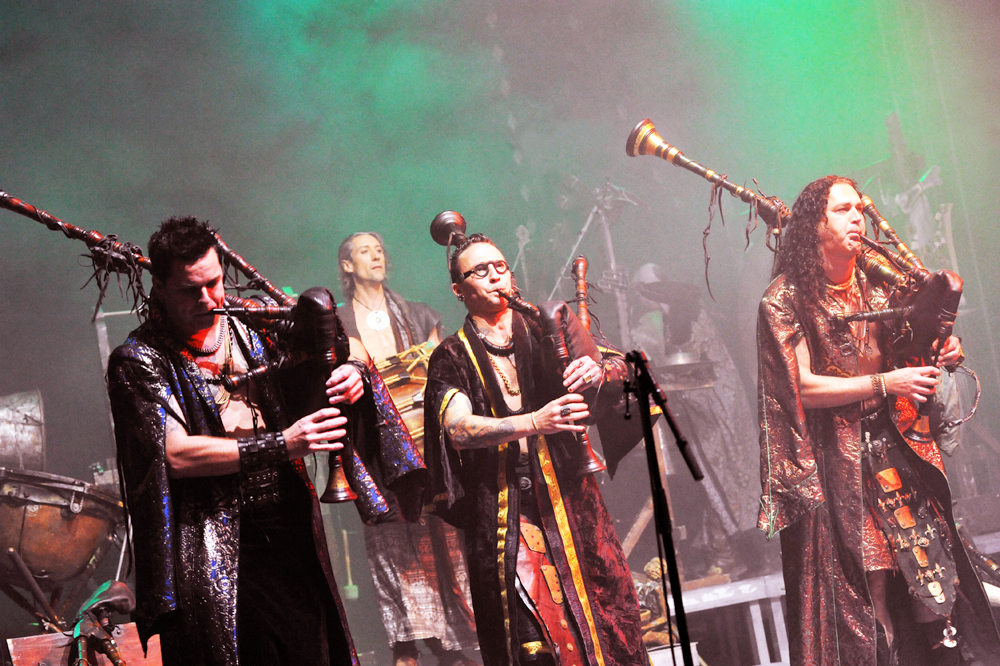
Act during Cross Culture Festival in Warsaw, September 2011

The MSP was created amidst the Neo-Medieval music boom and still remains in the center of this type of music. Bands like Corvus Corax, In Extremo and Saltatio Mortis are among those who popularized the instrument far beyond what is today loosely referred to as "medieval music".
