= Corvus Corax (band) =

German Medieval music band

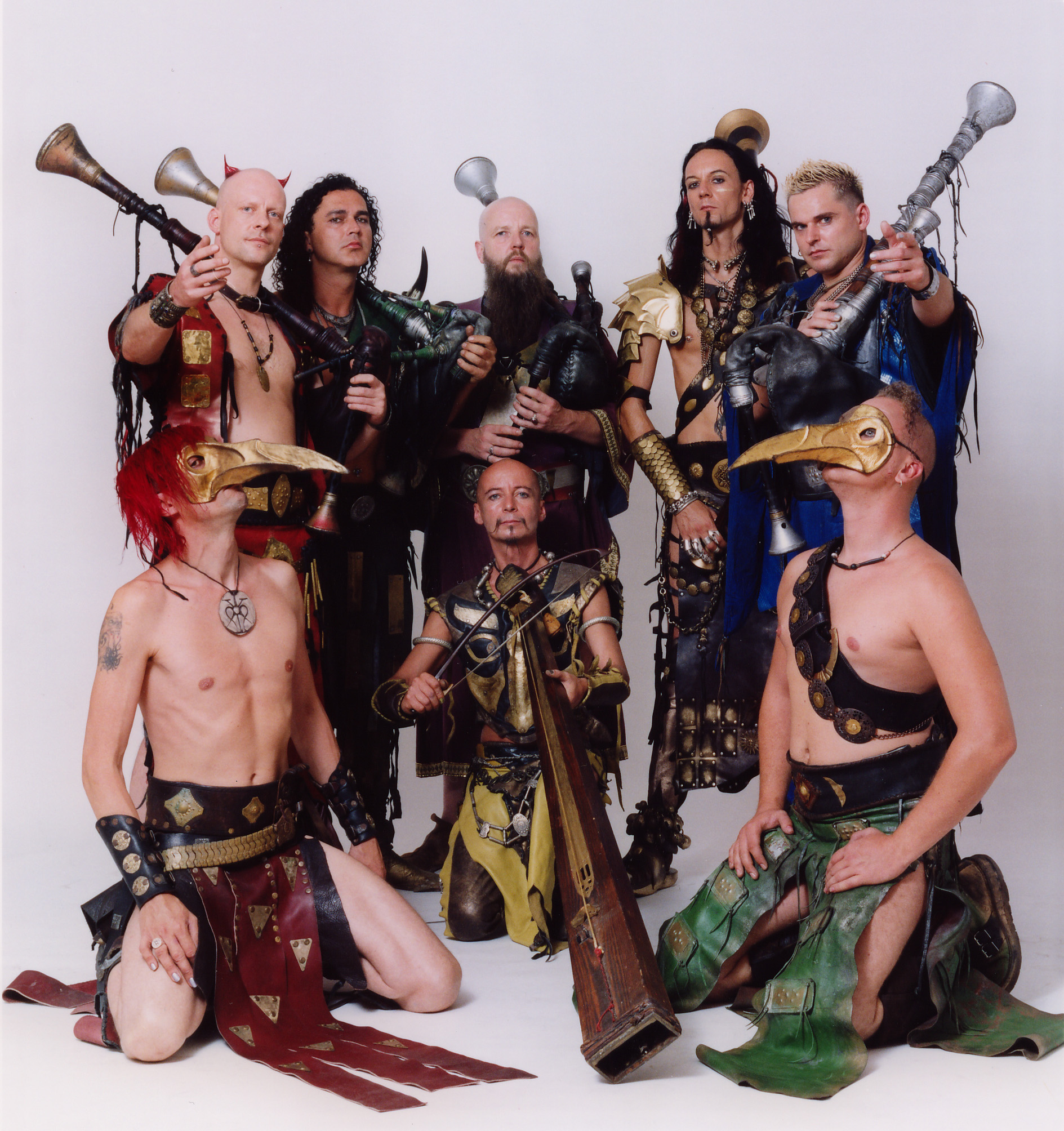

Background information
- Also known as: Die Könige der Spielleute (The Kings of Minstrels)
- Origin: Germany
- Genre: Medieval rock
- Years active: 1989–present
- Labels: Behzmokum, Noir Records
- Members: Castus Rabensang; Hatz; Norri der Drescher; Micha der Frick; Aldo; Alex; Juan
- Past members: Mike "Teufel" Paulenz; Martin Ukrasvan; Meister Selbfried; Wim (Venustus); Brandan; Pan Peter; Donar von Avignon; Jagbird; Mr.Poettner; Jean; Strahli; Ardor; Patrick; Jordon; Vit; Steve; Xandru; Phil
- Website: corvuscorax.de

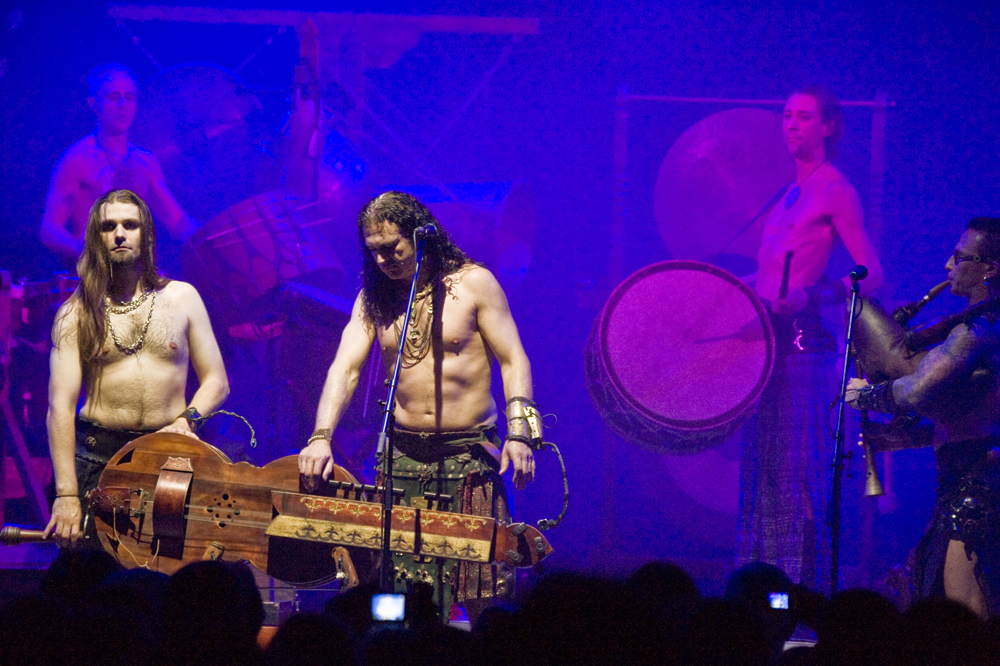
Performance in Warsaw in September 2011

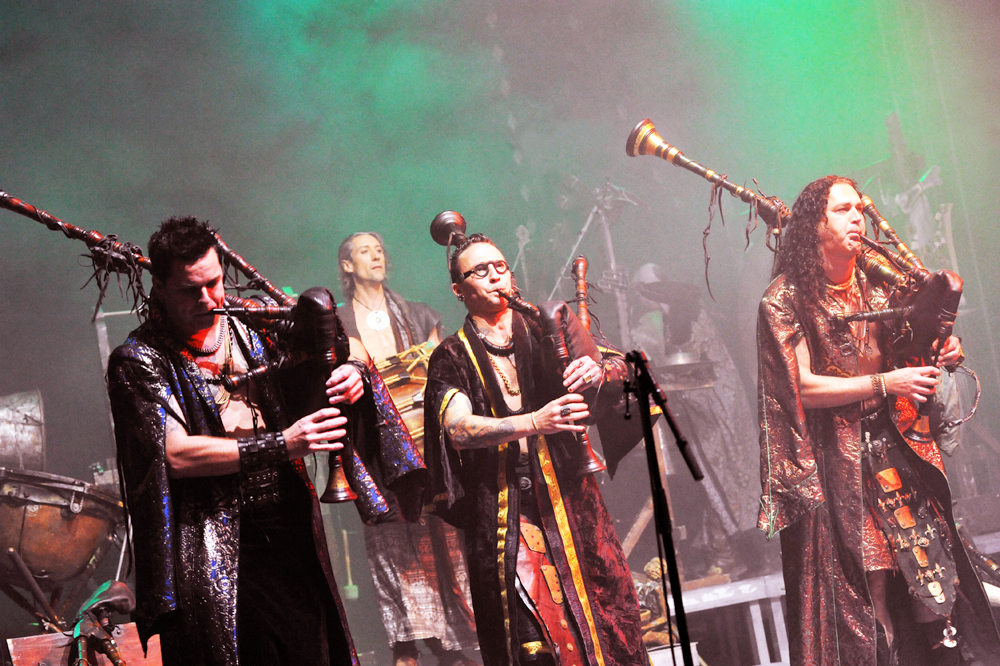
Act during Cross Culture Festival in Warsaw, September 2011

Corvus Corax is a German band known for playing Medieval rock using authentic instruments. Their name is the scientific name for the common raven. The band was formed in 1989 by Castus Rabensang, Wim (Venustus) and Meister Selbfried ("Master Selfpeace") in East Germany. The band often uses bagpipes as the solo instrument; their live performances attract attention with the bizarre look of the musicians being reminiscent of ancient Greek myths: half-naked, dressed in unusual clothes, wearing primitive tribal decorations, often tattooed.

Today the band consists of seven members: Castus Rabensang ("Castus Ravensong"), Xandru, Norri (formerly known as Harmann der Drescher), Hatz ("Hunt"), Vit and Victorius. In May 2005 Meister Selbfried, one of the Corvus Corax founders and the researcher of medieval music, decided to cease his active musicianship and to dedicate himself mostly to managing Corvus Corax's own label Pica Records. His place in the line-up was taken by Jordon Finus in 2006.

The band releases its music through Pica Records in Europe and Noir Records in the US. The Cantus Buranus projects have thus far been released in Europe by Roadrunner Europe.

== Interpretation and theory ==
Corvus Corax draws on a number of sources to try to make their music as authentic as possible: they have used documents that "condemn profane music" as an indicator of what the music might have sounded like, and drawn on nineteenth century scholarly treatises for information.

But the profane music of the day was often accompanied by a droning bass tone similar to that generated by the bourdon stop on an organ, which is provided in Corvus Corax's case by the drones on their bagpipes. An inkling as to the harmonies used is found in a song by Walter von der Vogelweide, in which he calls for the song to be played "the old way", meaning harmonising with thirds. At the time, the third was considered an awkward, ugly interval by the sacred musician—like the tritone, or diabolus in musica—but it was a common interval in folk music.

It is on this that Corvus Corax's interpretation hinges: medieval popular music was played more from the heart than the brain, and despite making use of scholarship to give them a grounding, Corvus Corax attempts to maintain the spirited, free manner in which the minstrels themselves would have played the music.

== Projects ==
In 1996, the band released the album Tanzwut which combined the elements of metal music with their brand sound of bagpipes. The CD turned out to be a commercially successful experiment and the band decided to continue the tradition of that album in a separate musical project called Tanzwut, which included Castus Rabensang (German Rabensang = ravensong), Wim, and Teufel (German Teufel = Devil) from Corvus Corax as well as three new members.

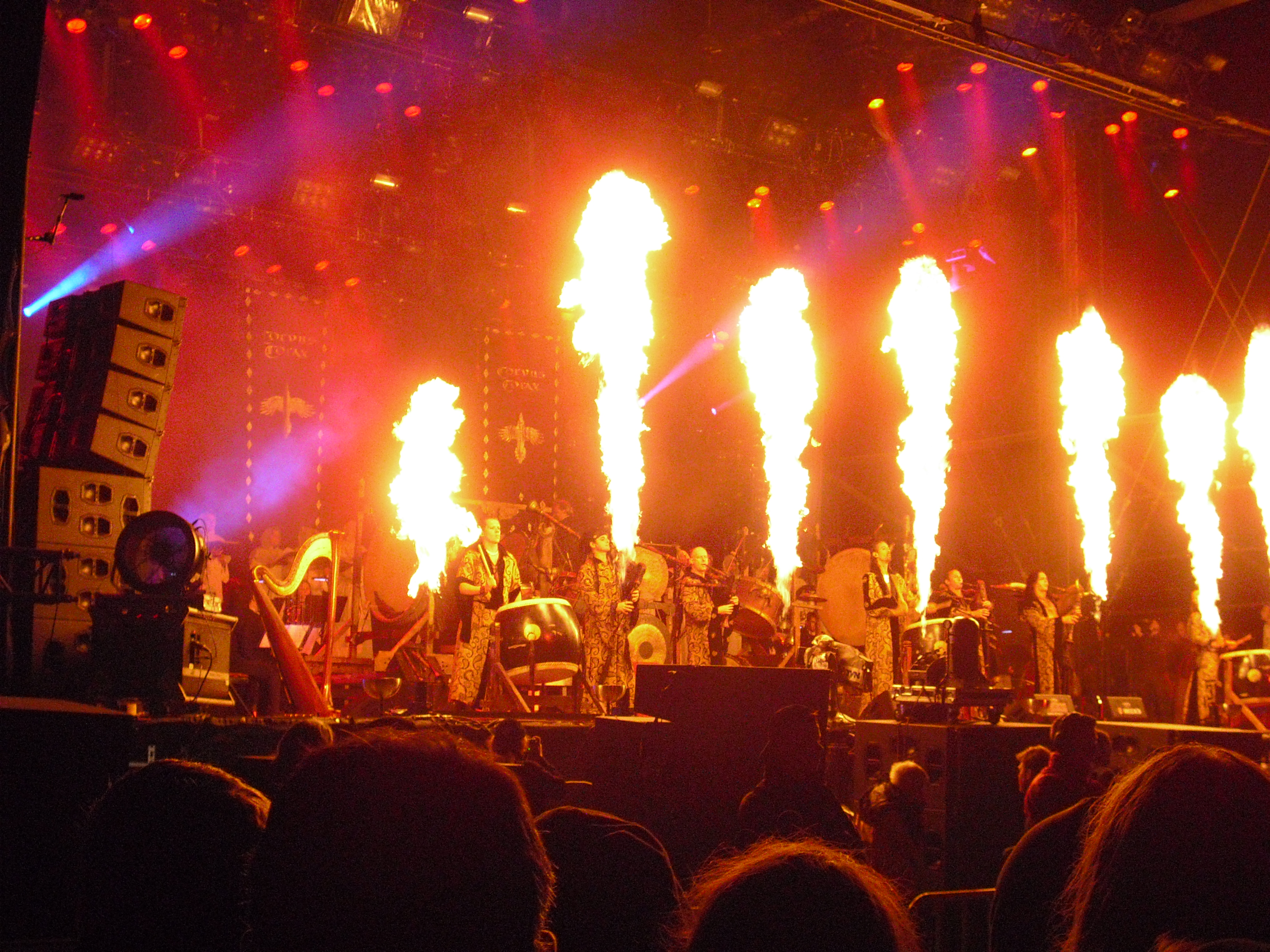
Corvus Corax performing live at Wacken Open Air 2010

In 2005, Corvus Corax started the ambitious project Cantus Buranus: a full-length opera set to the original Carmina Burana manuscript lyrics. The music for the opera was fully composed by the band and had no connection with the famous work by Carl Orff. A live CD and DVD recording of Cantus Buranus was released in March 2006.

2005 also marked the band's debut concerts in the US. The band performed four sets on each of four different days in mid-October, not far from Philadelphia at the Pennsylvania Renaissance Faire.

Out on 1 August 2008 via the band owned label Pica Music, Cantus Buranus II was released., It is a new orchestral recording of songs from the medieval manuscript "Carmina Burana". The Berlin-based act created a composition for orchestra, choir and a medieval ensemble and recorded the CD and DVD live in the Museum Island in front of 5,000 people.

In 2009 the band would collaborate with Simon Pressey, audio director of Dragon Age: Origins, to reinterpret the main theme in their own style. They would then go on to contribute additional arrangements to the soundtrack of the latest game in the series, Dragon Age: The Veilguard, in 2020.

A collaboration with the Russian band Ottawa Yo appeared on YouTube on December 31, 2022.

Corvus Corax performed a live rendition of their song "Ballade De Mercy" in the pilot episode of the TV series Game of Thrones, based on the fantasy series A Song of Ice and Fire by George R.R. Martin. The pilot episode was changed dramatically before it aired on TV, and the performance was not used.

== Discography ==
=== Studio albums ===
- Ante Casu Peccati (1989)
- Congregatio (1990)
- Inter Deum Et Diabolum Semper Musica Est (1993)
- Tritonus (1995)
- Viator (1998)
- Tempi Antiquii (1999, compilation of works from 1988 to 1992)
- Mille Anni Passi Sunt (2000 – limited edition of 2000 copies issued as 'MM')
- In Electronica Remixe (2000)
- Seikilos (2002)
- Best of Corvus Corax (2005)
- Cantus Buranus (2005)
- Venus Vina Musica (2006)
- Kaltenberg Anno MMVII (2007, compilation)
- Cantus Buranus II (released on 1 August 2008)
- Cantus Buranus – Das Orgelwerk (released on 5 December 2008)
- Kaltenberg Anno MMX (2010, compilation)
- Sverker (2011)
- Gimlie (2013)
- Ars Mystica – Selectio 1989–2016 (2016, compilation)
- Der Fluch des Drachen (2017)
- Skál (2018)
- Die Maske des Roten Todes (2021)
- Era Metallum (2022)
- Tausend Jahre Tanzmusik (2024)

=== Live Albums ===
- Live auf dem Wäscherschloß (1998)
- Gaudia Vite (live) (2003)
- Cantus Buranus Live in Berlin (2006)
- Live in Berlin (released in July 2009)
- Sverker Live DVD & CD At Summer Breeze & Castelfest – feat. WADOKYO (2013)
- Live 2015 – Auf dem Trolls et Légendes Festival (2015)
- In Ecclesia – Live (2026)

=== EPs/Singles ===
- Tanzwut EP (1996)
- Corvus Corax erzählen Märchen aus alter Zeit EP (2000)
- Hymnus Cantica CDS (2002)

=== DVD/Video ===
- Gaudia Vite Live DVD – USA Edition (2006)
- Cantus Buranus Live in Berlin DVD (2006)
- Corvus Corax Live in Berlin – Passionskirche DVD (2009)
- Cantus Buranus Live in München DVD (2010)
- Sverker Live DVD & CD At Summer Breeze & Castelfest – feat. WADOKYO (2013)

== See also ==
- In Extremo
- Tanzwut
