= Tromba marina =

Medieval string instrument

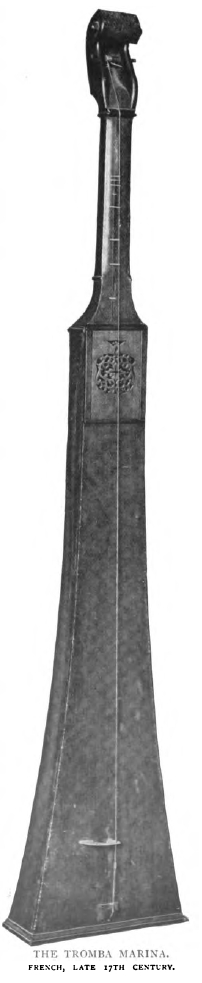
- Tromba marina owned by Francis William Galpin in 1906.: Bowed string instruments

Related instruments
- Đàn bầu; Duxianqin; Ektara; Tea chest bass

Marine trumpet, or Nonnentrompete

A tromba marina, marine trumpet, trumpet marine or nuns' fiddle (Fr. trompette marine; Ger. Marientrompete, Trompetengeige, Nonnengeige or Trumscheit, Pol. tubmaryna) is a triangular bowed string instrument used in medieval and Renaissance Europe that was highly popular in the 15th century in England and survived into the 18th century. The tromba marina consists of a body and neck in the shape of a truncated cone resting on a triangular base. It is usually four to seven feet long, and is a monochord (although some versions have sympathetically-vibrating strings). It is played without stopping the string, but playing natural harmonics by lightly touching the string with the thumb at nodal points. Its name comes from its trumpet like sound due to the unusual construction of the bridge, and the resemblance of its contour to the marine speaking-trumpet of the Middle Ages.

== Construction ==
The body of the marine trumpet is generally either three sides of wood joined in an elongated triangle shape with a pegbox at the apex; or a body of three to six ribs, a frontal soundboard, and a distinguishable neck. In most cases the bottom end of the instrument is open; some historical models use sound-holes. The single string, generally the D string of a cello, most often is tuned to the C three octaves below middle C. It attaches at the soundboard and passes over one foot of the bridge, leaving the other foot to vibrate freely on a plate of ivory or glass set into the soundboard, creating a brassy buzz. From its curiously irregular shape, the bridge was also known as the shoe; it was thick and high at the one side on which rested the string, and low and narrow at the other which was left loose so that it vibrated against the belly with every movement of the bow. A string called a guidon is tied around the playing string below the bridge and runs up to the pegbox where it is wrapped around a peg. The guidon adjusts the balance of the bridge by pulling the playing string.

The measurements of the tromba marina varied considerably, as did the shape of the body and the number of strings. An octave string, half the length of the melody string, and even two more, respectively the twelfth and the double octave, not resting on the bridge but acting as sympathetic strings, were sometimes added to improve the timbre by strengthening the pure harmonic tones without increasing the blare due to the action of the bridge.

== History ==
In the days of Michael Praetorius (1618), the length of the Trumscheit was 7 feet 3 inches (2.21 m) and the three sides at the base measured 7 inches (180 mm), tapering to 2 inches (51 mm) at the neck. There was at first only one string, generally a D cello string. The heavy bow, similar to that of the cello, is used between the highest positions of the left hand at the nodal points and the nut of the head. In a Trumscheit in the collection of the Kgl. Hochschule, at Charlottenburg (No. 772 in catalogue) the frets are lettered A, D, F, A, D, F, G, A, B, C, D.

In Germany, at the time when the trumpet was extensively used in the churches, nuns often substituted the tromba marina because women were not allowed to play trumpets—hence the name Nonnengeige (literally, nuns' violin). In France, the Grande Ecurie du Roi comprised five trumpets-marine and cromornes among the band in 1662, when the charge was mentioned for the first time in the accounts; and in 1666 the number was increased to six. The instrument fell into disuse during the first half of the 18th century (see equal temperament), and was only to be seen in the hands of itinerant and street musicians.

In modern times, the group Corvus Corax still regularly plays the tromba marina.

== See also ==
- Crwth
- Long-string instrument
