= Clerici vagantes =

Latin term meaning "wandering clergy"

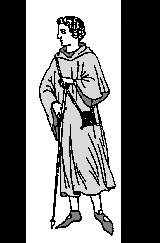
A travelling student/scholar, with stick and robe

Clerici vagantes or vagabundi (singular clericus vagans or vagabundus) is a medieval Latin term meaning "wandering clergy" applied in early canon law to those clergy who led a wandering life either because they had no benefice or because they had deserted the church to which they had been attached.

The term refers also to wandering students, ex-students, and even professors, "moving from town to town in search of learning and still more of adventure, nominally clerks but leading often very unclerical lives". Recently, the belief that the clerici vagantes played an important role in the literary atmosphere of the so-called Renaissance of the 12th century, for the kind of fresh poetry in medieval Latin called goliardic poetry, in which famous wandering scholars (scholares vagantes; in German fahrenden Schüler) like Hugh Primas and the anonymous Archpoet (both 12th century) satirically criticised the medieval Church, has been questioned.

== History ==
As early as the fifth and sixth centuries, measures were taken against them, such as when the Council of Chalcedon forbade ordination without appointment to a specific church, or when the Council of Valencia (524?) threatened the vagantes with excommunication, a penalty extended in the same year by the Synod of Arles to those who gave them shelter. Nevertheless, the vagantes still flourished, and frequently aided bishops and other clergy in the discharge of their duties or became chaplains in the castles of the knights, thus making their profession a trade and interfering with the orderly conditions and ministrations of the regular clergy. In 789 Charlemagne renewed the Chalcedon injunctions, and also forbade the entertainment of any clergy who could not produce letters from their bishops. But even these measures failed, and in the ninth century several synods (such as those of Mainz in 847 and Pavia in 845–850) sought to check the vagantes and their efforts to take possession of benefices already conferred on others, and such prelates as Agobard of Lyon, in his De privilegio et jure sacerdotii, also opposed them. In the twelfth century Gerhoh of Reichersberg again complained about them in his Liber de simonia, but matters became far worse in the following century, when the Synods of Mainz (1261), Aschaffenburg (1292), Sankt Pölten (1284) and Treves (1310) declared against the vagantes. In Bavaria they were expressly excluded from the king's peaces (Landfrieden) of 1244, 1281, and 1300.

The pressure against goliards ended in 1231 when, after the University of Paris strike of 1229, pope Gregory IX (himself an alumnus of the University of Paris) issued the papal bull Parens scientiarum, by which, among other exemptions, he confirmed a decision of Philip Augustus to grant students immunity from lay jurisdiction.

=== Goliards ===
A peculiar type of vagantes arose in France in the twelfth century, later spreading to England and Germany. These were the roving minstrels: mostly dissolute students or wandering clergy, first called clerici vagantes or ribaldi ("rascals"), later (after the early 13th century) chiefly known as goliardi or goliardenses, terms apparently meaning "sons of Goliath". They were masters of poetic form, but many councils of the 13th and 14th centuries sought to restrict the goliards and their excesses. These measures seem to have practically suppressed the goliards in France by the end of the 13th century, but in Germany they survived under various names until the late 15th century. Hugo von Trimberg devoted a special chapter of his Der Renner ("The Runner") to the ribaldi and other vagantes, and in England Geoffrey Chaucer alluded to them in uncomplimentary terms.

The goliards were believed to play an important role in the literary atmosphere of the so-called Renaissance of the 12th century, with fresh medieval Latin poetry, from poems in the Cambridge University Library MS Gg. 5.35 to the well known Carmina Burana of the 13th century (the Codex Buranum). Although they were part of the clergy, their poetry was believed to be "one of the earliest disintegrating forces in the mediaeval church". Wandering scholars and poets include Walter Map (c. 1140–1208), Hugh Primas (12th century), and the anonymous Archpoet (c. 1130 – c. 1165), "the greatest" of them all.

However, historical and philological research recently questioned that assumption and at times strictly distinguished between "goliardic poets" on the one hand and "goliards" on the other hand. So far, not a single contact between both groups has been traced in the source material. The poets often worked as teachers in the secular clergy.

== See also ==
- Acephali
- Catholic clergy
- Medieval university
- Commercium song
- Drinkers Mass, parodies attributed to clerici vagantes
- Goliardia
- Episcopus Vagans

== Sources ==
- Hauck, Albert, "Vagantes". In: Jackson, Samuel Macauley, New Schaff–Herzog Encyclopedia of Religious Knowledge, vol. XII (1914). London and New York: Funk and Wagnalls
- Helen Waddell, The Wandering Scholars of the Middle Ages, Dover Publications, New York, 2000 ISBN 0-486-41436-1
- Charles Homer Haskins, Rise of Universities, Transaction Publishers, 2002 ISBN 978-0-7658-0895-0
- Marian Weiß, Die mittellateinische Goliardendichtung und ihr historischer Kontext: Komik im Kosmos der Kathedralschulen Nordfrankreichs. With an English Summary, Gießen, 2018

Attribution
