= The Wandering Scholar =

Opera by Gustav Holst

- Chamber opera by Gustav Holst
- Holst, circa 1921
- Librettist: Clifford Bax
- Based on: The Wandering Scholars by Helen Waddell
- Premiere: 31 January 1934; David Lewis Theatre, Liverpool, England

The Wandering Scholar, Op. 50 is a chamber opera in one act by the English composer Gustav Holst, composed 1929–30. The libretto, by Clifford Bax, is based on the book The Wandering Scholars by Helen Waddell.

The opera received its premiere at the David Lewis Theatre, Liverpool, on 31 January 1934, but Holst did not hear the live performance because he was too ill to attend. The manuscript contains notes in Holst's own hand such as "More harmony" and "Tempo?", which indicated that Holst had thoughts of revising the work. However, Holst died in May 1934 and did not revise the manuscript.

Benjamin Britten prepared a version for chamber orchestra, and this version was given at the Cheltenham Music Festival in 1951. In 1968, Britten and Imogen Holst edited the opera for publication.

== Roles ==
Roles, voice types, premiere cast
Role	Voice type	Premiere cast, 31 January 1934 Conductor: J. E. Wallace
Pierre, a scholar	tenor	John Ward
Father Philippe, a priest	bass	S. R. Maher
Louis, a farmer	baritone	Richard Pryce
Alison, his wife	soprano	Irene Eastwood

== Synopsis ==
Place: 13th-century farmhouse in France, the home of Louis, a farmer, and his wife Alison.

Louis is preparing to go to town to obtain provisions, and tries to kiss Alison before leaving, but she rebuffs him. After Louis departs, Alison pulls out a concealed almond-cake, a bottle of Burgundy, and pork, to entertain Father Philippe, who has designs on her. Father Philippe arrives, and makes a pass at Alison. She initially claims that she will not deceive her husband, but after she points out the attic and that the pork will take 20 minutes to cook, they start to move towards the attic. Just then, Pierre, a poor wandering scholar, arrives and begs for food. Alison is sympathetic to Pierre's plight, but Father Philippe wants Pierre to leave immediately. Alison allows Pierre to stay, finding him handsome. Pierre begins to tell his story. Father Philippe then brandishes Louis' cudgel and drives Pierre away.

Father Philippe then makes a second attempt to take Alison up to the attic, expressing concern about whether the ladder will bear his weight. Alison, however, hears Louis returning, and is concerned because she and Louis had no provisions when he had left for town. Alison and Father Philippe hide the cake, Burgundy and pork, and Father Philippe conceals himself. Louis and Pierre enter, with Louis asking Alison to provide food for Pierre. Alison protests that Louis was supposed to go to town to obtain provisions. Pierre begins to tell a tale about a herd of pigs, and lets slip that there is a piece of pork in the pot on the stove. Louis is stunned at this, and asks Alison if there is pork in the pot. Alison denies this, but Louis asks to take the lid off, which reveals the pork. Alison feigns surprise, and as Pierre continues his story of the pigs and a wolf, where the story parallels the earlier situation with him, Alison and Father Philippe. Alison protests that Pierre is some sort of demonic wizard who made the food magically appear, but Pierre finishes his tale with an allusion to a hidden priest who would have robbed them. Louis discovers Father Philippe and drives him out of the house. Alison brings the cooked pork to the table. Louis orders Pierre to sit at the table. Alison is about to do the same, but Louis orders her not to sit, and instead to go up to the attic. She obeys nervously, with Louis following her with his cudgel. Pierre settles down to food and drink as the curtain falls.

== Recordings ==
- HMV ASD3097 (original LP issue) / EMI CDC 7 49409 2 (CD reissue): Norma Burrowes (Alison), Michael Rippon (Louis), Michael Langdon (Father Philippe), Robert Tear (Pierre); English Opera Group; English Chamber Orchestra; Steuart Bedford, conductor
- Chandos CHAN 9734: Ingrid Attrot (Alison), Alan Opie (Louis), Donald Maxwell (Father Philippe), Neill Archer (Pierre); Northern Sinfonia; Richard Hickox, conductor

== See also ==
- Clerici vagantes – Medieval Latin for wandering scholars
- Goliards
