= Archpoet =

12th-century anonymous Latin poet

- Born: c. 1130
- Died: c. 1165
- Writing career
- Pen name: Archipoeta
- Language: Medieval Latin
- Genre: Courtly poetry
- Notable work: "Confession"
- Movement: Goliard

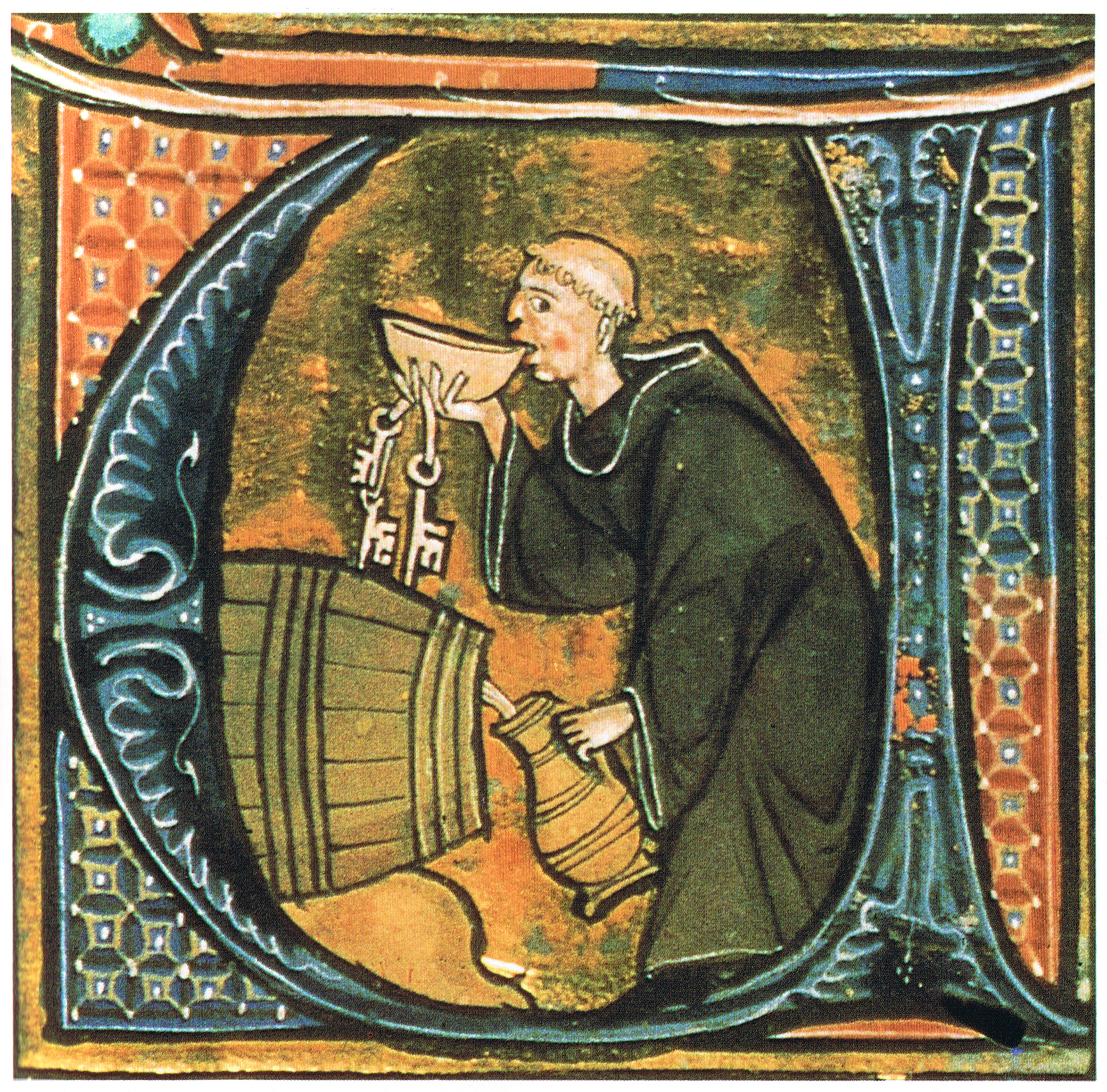
A cellarer testing his wine. (13th century)

The Archpoet (c. 1130 – c. 1165), or Archipoeta (in Latin and German), was an anonymous 12th-century author of ten medieval Latin poems, the most famous being his "Confession" found in the Carmina Burana manuscript (under CB 191). Along with Hugh Primas of Orléans (with whom he has sometimes been confused), (Note: Various sources (for example, see Lejay 1913: 33) have erroneously taken "Archipoeta" to be an alias or pen name of Hugh of Orléans while in fact there are numerous indications establishing their being two different individuals. Peter Dronke goes even as far as to call the Archpoet Hugh's "brillante discepolo e successore" (Dronke 2007: 137), brilliant disciple and successor.) he is cited as the best exemplar of Goliardic poetry and one of the stellar poets of the Latin Middle Ages.

Knowledge about him comes essentially from his poems found in manuscripts: his noble birth in an unspecified region of Western Europe, his respectable and classical education, his association with Archchancellor Rainald of Dassel's court, and his poetic activity linked to it in both content and purpose. As such, it has been speculated that the bibulous, extravagant personality emanating from his work could be only serving as a façade despite its apparent autobiographical trend.

== Biography ==
=== Identity and nickname ===
His existence has been elaborated upon the authorial superscription "Archipoeta" appearing with the poems now ascribed to him in a small number of manuscripts. While some recent—and so far inconclusive—attempts have been made to identify the Archpoet as either one of two Rodulfuses from the Emperor Frederick Barbarossa's entourage, his real identity has never been found and is most likely lost for good.

It has been suggested by W. H. T. Jackson and others that his nickname could be a play on his patron Rainald of Dassel's title of Archchancellor (Archicancellarius in Latin), even if its exact origins are ultimately left open to speculation. Moreover, it is not known how he came to earn the nickname or who bestowed it to him: whether as a mark of esteem from the audiences, other poets, Rainald himself; as a satirical jest on his patron's title; or as an ironical mock self-attribution. There has been report of at least two other "clericus vagus", itinerant clerics, bearing the "Archipoeta" pseudonym or title around that time: one Nicholas who briefly resided with the Cistercians at their abbey, and Henry of Avranches (around 1250); yet both are distinct from the "Archipoeta" of Barbarossa's reigning period (1155–1190).

=== Conjectured life ===
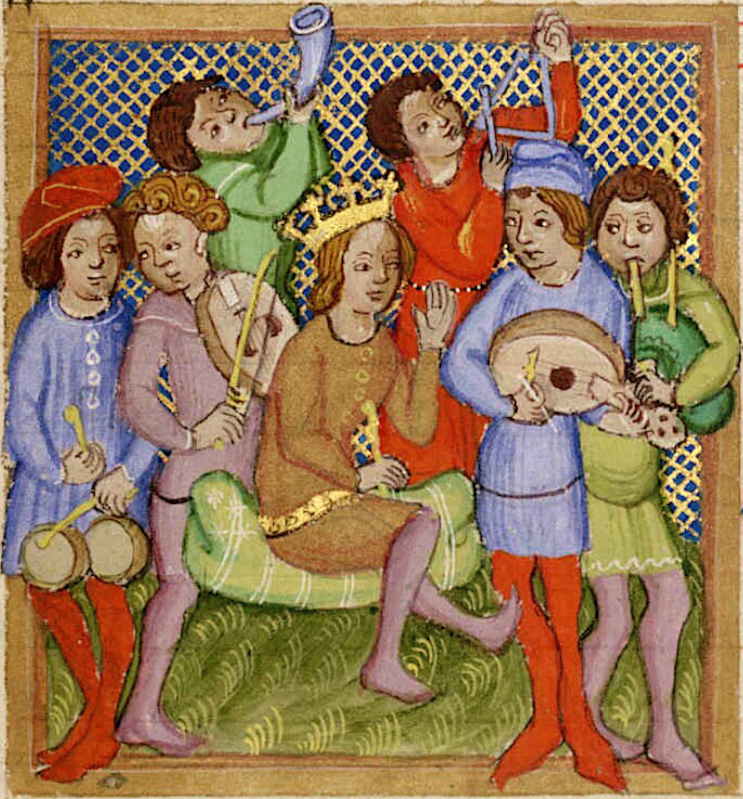
The Archpoet flourished during the same time as many of the famous troubadours, who wrote in vernacular languages rather than Latin. (14th century)

The Archpoet's living circumstances have been surmised from the indicative content of his poems but mostly from the life of Rainald of Dassel. Because he designates Rainald as Archbishop of Cologne, (Note: Keeping in line with the hypothesis that his nickname or pseudonym was inspired by the titles of his patron, it explains why he is sometimes referred to as the "Archpoet of Cologne"; for example, see Whicher 1949: 102–103 and Curtius 1990: 29.) it shows that he must have been alive and active for at least some time between 1159 (when Rainald became archbishop) and 1167 (when he died); furthermore, all of his datable poems fall within 1162 and 1164. With the passing of his patron in 1167, no more is heard from the Archpoet. Also, in poem X, Peter Dronke writes, "he counts himself among the iuvenes: while technically a iuvenis can be any age between twenty-one and fifty, it would seem plausible to imagine the Archpoet as thirty or thirty-five at the time of this composition, and to set his birth not too far from 1130."

Several indications concur as to establish that the Archpoet came from a place north of the Alps, (Note: The main evidence being his using the word "transmontanos" (meaning "which lives or comes from beyond the mountains" in Latin) in line 14 of poem III, when it is made clear that he is writing from within Italy and thus south of the Alps.) although no solid claim can be made as to which country, even though Germany has repeatedly and traditionally being taken as his birthplace. He refers to himself as "ortus a militibus", of knightly birth, and, coming from such a high class, was most certainly well-educated in the liberal arts, theology and the classics. In poem IV, he states that he chose the pursuit of poetry (as symbolized by the Roman poet Virgil) over a career in the military (as symbolized by the Trojan warrior Paris) as his birth permitted and disposed him to. It has been deduced from the same poem that he first traveled to Salerno in order to pursue medical studies but that due to ill health, he had to abandon this project.

It was probably then that he began working—possibly as a "dictamen", a "master of the art of writing letters"—at the court of Rainald of Dassel, the bishop elector of Cologne and Archchancellor to Frederick Barbarossa, Holy Roman Emperor, about which he wrote, according to Ernst Robert Curtius, "[t]he most brilliant stanzas" among the many written about and/or for him during the 35 years of his reign. His references to Salerno, Vienna, and Cologne in his poems, as well as several details gleaned from the Archchancellor's court displacements, suggest that he did travel around northern Italy, Provence, Burgundy, Austria and Germany during his life. It is known that the Archpoet lived for some time—possibly the last years of his life—at the monastery of St. Martin in Cologne. As is the case with many medieval and/or anonymous authors, very little else can be said with certainty about his life.

=== Modern critical reassessment ===
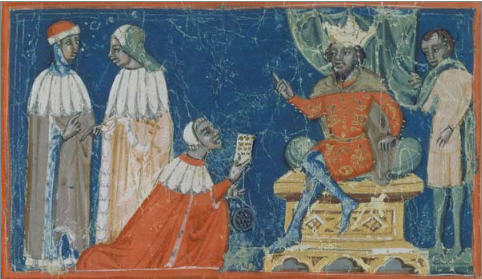
Frederick Barbarossa, Holy Roman Emperor from 1155 to 1190. (14th century)

While it is still commonly assumed that the Archpoet was a follower of the Goliard tradition—writing student drinking songs, parodies critical of the Church and satires on the life of itinerant clergy in the Middle Ages—, the noted scholar Peter Dronke proposed a very different portrait in his 1968 book The Medieval Lyric:

[H]e was in fact a court poet, perhaps also a civil servant or minor diplomat, in the service of the Imperial Chancellor, and so almost certainly a member of the circle around Frederick Barbarossa himself. I am convinced that his leitmotif of the wayward, wretched vagabond-poet who is compelled to beg from his patron and his audience contains far less autobiography than literary craft... The Archpoet's picture of the vagabond-poet (whatever element of literal truth it may have contained) has been drawn for the sophisticated entertainment of that international set of diplomats and legislators, high-born scholars and prelates who surrounded the Emperor, whose lingua franca was Latin, and among whom the Archpoet probably, by his birth and position, moved as an equal.

This view of the Archpoet and his milieu, severely contrasting with that of the previous generations of researchers and writers such as J. A. Symonds and Helen Waddell, created a break in modern High Middle Ages scholarship about the Goliards and, in spite of not creating consensus within the academic community, has since been embraced by many scholars. Summarizing Dronke's view by using English writer Geoffrey Chaucer as an example of differentiation between actual (historical) self and poetic (fictional) persona, Jan Ziolkowski wrote that the Archpoet's shenanigans "may be little more than a stance struck by the poet to entertain his audience; the persona could be as far from the reality as that of Chaucer the character was from Chaucer the poet or man." Dronke further argued that the Archpoet could well have been Hugh Primas's student in Orléans, getting acquainted through him with various rare Classical poets and also with his personal style (themes and techniques).

== Works ==
=== Overview ===
The Archpoet is known today through ten Latin poems or carmina (plural form of carmen, Latin equivalent of "song" or "chant") found in various manuscripts dating back to the 12th and 13th centuries. Listed here are the poems, identified, as is customary, by their incipit:

- I: "Lingua balbus, hebes ingenio"
- II: "Fama tuba dante sonum"
- III: "Omnia tempus habent"
- IV: "Archicancellarie, vir discrete mentis"
- V: "Nocte quadam sabbati somno iam refectus"
- VI: "En habeo versus te precipiente reversus"
- VII: "Archicancellarie, viris maior ceteris"
- VIII: "Presul urbis Agripine"
- IX: "Salve, mundi domine, Cesar noster, ave!"
- X: "Estuans intrinsecus ira vehementi" (Note: "Aestuans intrinsecus" is also found as a variant to "Estuans intrinsecus" since medieval manuscripts do not always use the same spelling for the same texts.) ("Confession")

The works of the Archpoet have been found and preserved in the following manuscripts, among others:

- Univ. Bibl. Göttingen Codex philol. 170 (12th century): I-VII; first stanza of VIII.
- Brussels Bibliothèque Royale 2071 (13th century): IX and X; stanzas 1–5 of VII.
- Codex Buranus: München Bayer. Staatsbibl. Clm 4660/4660a (13th century): X; 4 stanzas of IV.

The Carmina Burana thus contains the 25-stanza "Estuans intrinsecus" (X) under the reference number CB 191 (Note: While CB 191 is sometimes presented as having 30 stanzas, the last 5 (often put under CB 191a) are believed not to be the Archpoet's own work. See Wolff 1995: 529.) as well as 4 stanzas from "Archicancellarie, vir discrete mentis" (IV) under CB 220, (Note: As with the other poem, CB 220a (or sometimes CB 221) is believed to be another anonymous author's work. See Wolff 1995: 533. Both the Bibliotheca Augustana's and David Stampe's (reproducing Bischoff's) versions display these poems of contested origin as 191a and 220a.) starting with "Sepe de miseria" in the collection.

=== Presentation ===
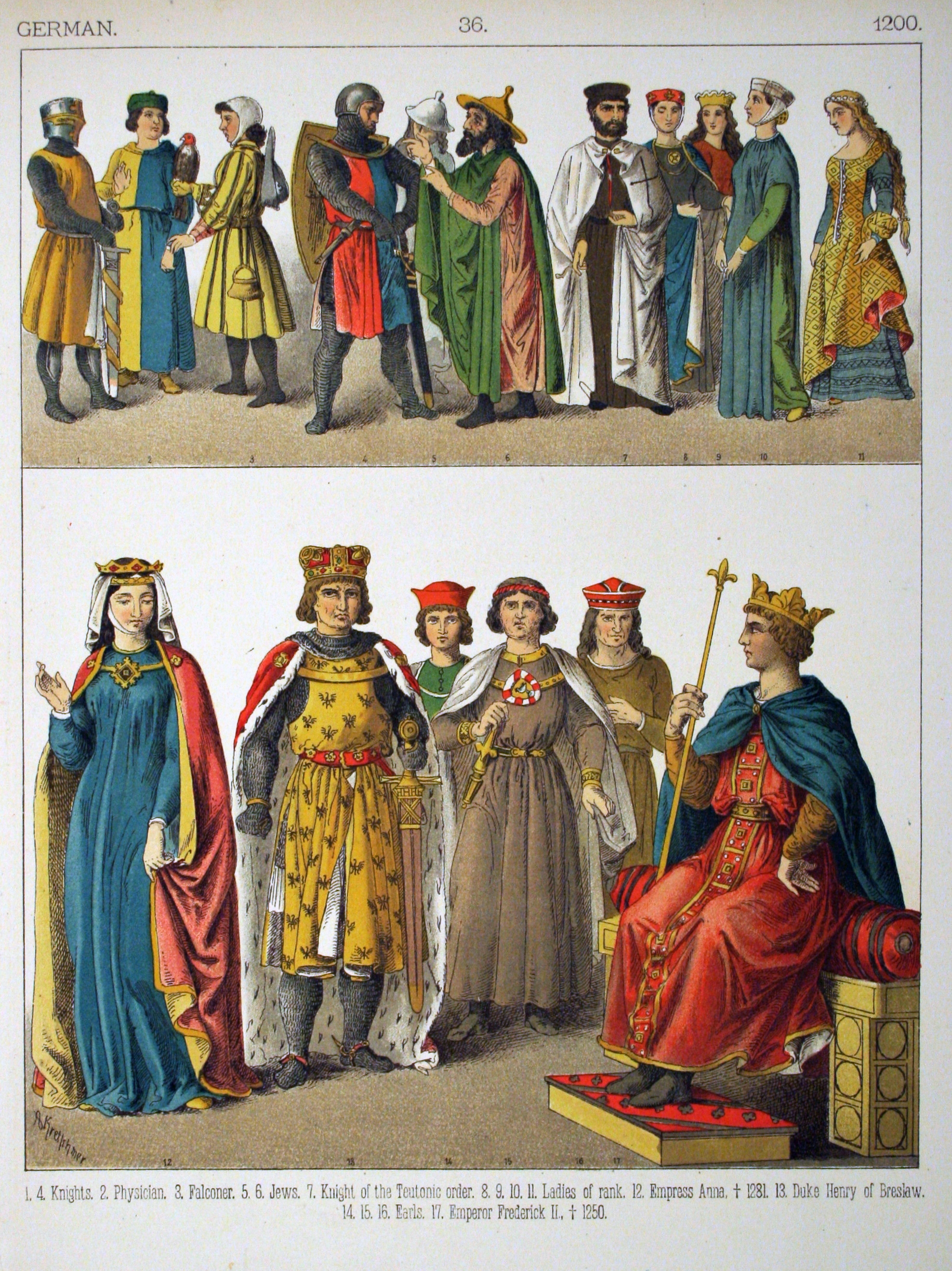
The poems of the Archpoet were composed for a courtly audience. (Costumes of All Nations, 1882)

Despite being quite dissimilar from one another in terms of tone and intent, the ten poems are all "occasional" in the sense that they have been written for a specific purpose under precise circumstances, whether to celebrate an event or respond to a request; in the Archpoet's case, concerning the court of his patron: eight of them are directed to Rainald of Dassel, while the two others are addressed to Frederick Barbarossa himself. For example, the fourth poem, "Archicancellarie, vir discrete mentis", was most probably written as a plaintive answer to what he felt was the unreasonable demand from Rainald that he write within one week an epic recounting the Emperor's campaign in Italy.

The Archpoet's poems are known for appearing "intensely personal": he features in almost all of them, and deals in an outspoken manner with intimate subjects such as his material (e.g. poverty, wandering) and spiritual (e.g. distress, anger, love) condition, his flawed and sinful nature, his wishes and aspirations. Many of his poems, whether panegyric or not, amount to very elaborate pleas to obtain food, drink, clothing, and money from his powerful patron. Yet far from falling into mere lyricism or honest confidence, they are often undermined by subtle sarcasm and disguised mockery, fitting with the persona the Archpoet seems to have created for himself as a free-spirited, vagabond hedonist, unrepentant in his propensity to overindulge and unblushing in the judgment of his self-worth. Aside from their recognized technical merits, the poems are imbued with a strong and pervading sense of humor manifested in the consummate use and manipulation of classical and biblical sources for parodic, sarcastic and ironic purposes.

=== "Confession" ===
Described as "the prototype of the goliardic songs" as well as "the masterpiece of the [Goliardic] school", the best known poem of the Archpoet is his tenth, "Estuans intrinsecus", commonly called the Goliardic "Confession" (sometimes "Confessio", "Confessio Goliae" or "Confession of Golias"), a metrical composition of ironical tone wherein he confesses his love of women, gambling, and drinking. It is purported to have been written in Pavia around the year 1163 for his patron as a confession and defense of his sins after a rival of the Archpoet witnessed and subsequently reported his reprobate behavior. For example, the oft-cited twelfth stanza (Note: There are numerous and significant variants in the different versions of the Latin text depending on the source manuscripts and the editorial choices of scholars, as is often the case with the bulk of medieval literature. The one chosen here is in no way the sole, authoritative form.) goes:

Latin original

Meum est propositum in taberna mori,
ut sint vina proxima morientis ori.
tunc cantabunt letius angelorum chori:
"Sit Deus propitius huic potatori."

English literal translation

My purpose is to die in a tavern,
so that wine might be close to my dying mouth.
Then a choir of angels will happily sing,
"May God be merciful toward this drinker." (Note: Note that both English translations have no official, authoritative sources; they are the free work of anonymous editors, and serve only as illustrations of the Latin original.)

English metrical translation

I am resolved to die in a tavern,
so wine will be close to my dying mouth.
Will sing gaily the angels' choir then:
"May God be merciful to this drunkard."

The parodic and satirical effect is mainly produced by the replacement of peccatori ("sinner") by potatori ("drunkard"), a reference to the Scripture: "Deus propitius esto mihi peccatori."^{(Luke 18:13)} The poem relies heavily on ambiguity for its overall effect: on one hand, the narrator poses as a penitent dissolute, while on the other he is not being apologetic at all.

The "Confession" was very famous in the Archpoet's time: compared to his other poems, which are mostly found in only one manuscript, "Estuans intrinsecus" has been copied in more than thirty, and it almost single-handedly accounts for his enduring appeal as the writer of one of the most popular medieval Latin poems.

== Interpretation and appraisal ==
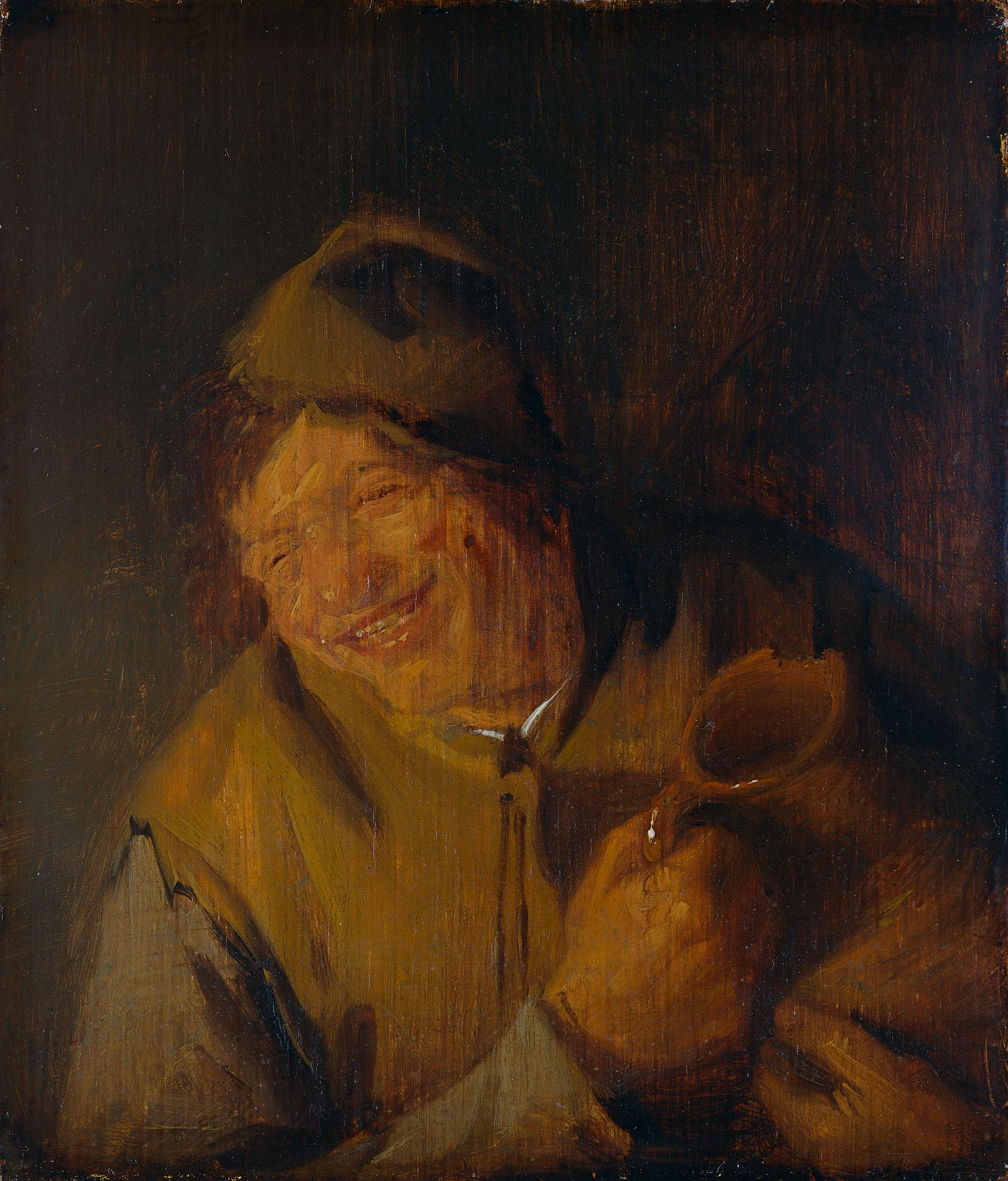
"Meum est propositum in taberna mori, ut sint vina proxima morientis ori." (Adriaen van Ostade, The Merry Peasant, 1630–1650)

- In her influential study The Wandering Scholars of the Middle Ages, Helen Waddell laudingly writes of the poem, stating that "Confessio Goliae is something more than the arch-type of a generation of vagabond scholars, or the greatest drinking song in the world: it is the first defiance by the artist of that society which it is his thankless business to amuse: the first cry from the House of the Potter, "Why hast thou made me thus?"."
- Reading the medieval "Confession" with the perspective of a modern cultural critic, philosopher Herbert Marcuse wrote of the Archpoet's artistic posture and keen sense of his particular situation: "Archipoeta is perhaps the first artist with the artist's genuine awareness of himself, who comprehended and openly emphasized that his vagabond life and his opposition to the surrounding world were an artistic necessity... The splendid strophes of his vagabond's confession resonate with the elevated consciousness of the authentic lifestyle of the freelance artist".

== In popular culture ==
- A section of the "Confession" supplies the text for the aria Estuans interius ira vehementi ("Burning with inner rage") that was set to music by Carl Orff in his 1935–1936 Carmina Burana cantata.
- John Myers Myers's 1949 novel Silverlock features Golias, the mythical patron saint of the Goliardic ordo vagorum, as one of the main characters, drawing heavily on the Archpoet's "Confession" for his portrayal.
- An old commercium song titled "Meum est propositum" (Video on YouTube) is composed from stanzas 12, 13, 15, 17, 19, and 18 of the "Confession". (Note: The song has been published in the German Allgemeines Deutsches Kommersbuch (152nd edition, 1956, p. 381).)
- The Archpoet is a character in Italian writer Umberto Eco's 2000 novel Baudolino.
- Mystics, Spirit, Voices, the 2000 debut album of the German musical project Lesiëm, features a song titled "In Taberna Mori" (Video on YouTube) which contains a fragment of the "Confession".
- The German darkwave band Helium Vola recorded versions of "Fama tuba" (II) on their 2001 studio album Helium Vola (track 7, "Fama Tuba" on YouTube), and of "Estuans intrinsecus" (X) on their 2004 studio album Liod (track 10, "Vagantenbeichte" on YouTube).

== Works cited ==
- Adcock, Fleur, ed. (1994). Hugh Primas and the Archpoet. Cambridge Medieval Classics. Vol. 2 (1st ed.). Cambridge: Cambridge University Press. ISBN 0-521-39546-1.
- Jeep, John M., ed. (January 2001). "Archpoet". Medieval Germany: An Encyclopedia. Routledge Encyclopedias of the Middle Ages (1st ed.). New York: Routledge/Taylor & Francis Group. pp. 21–22. ISBN 0-8240-7644-3.
- Harrington, Karl Pomeroy, ed. (November 1997) [1925]. "The Archpoet: Confession". Medieval Latin. Revised by Joseph Pucci (2nd ed.). Chicago & London: The University of Chicago Press. pp. 566–571. ISBN 0-226-31713-7.
- Sidwell, Keith, ed. (2002) [1995]. "Section 20.4: The Archpoet (fl. 1160)". Reading Medieval Latin (Reprint of the 1st ed.). Cambridge: Cambridge University Press. pp. 347–352. ISBN 0-521-44747-X.
