= Biernagel =

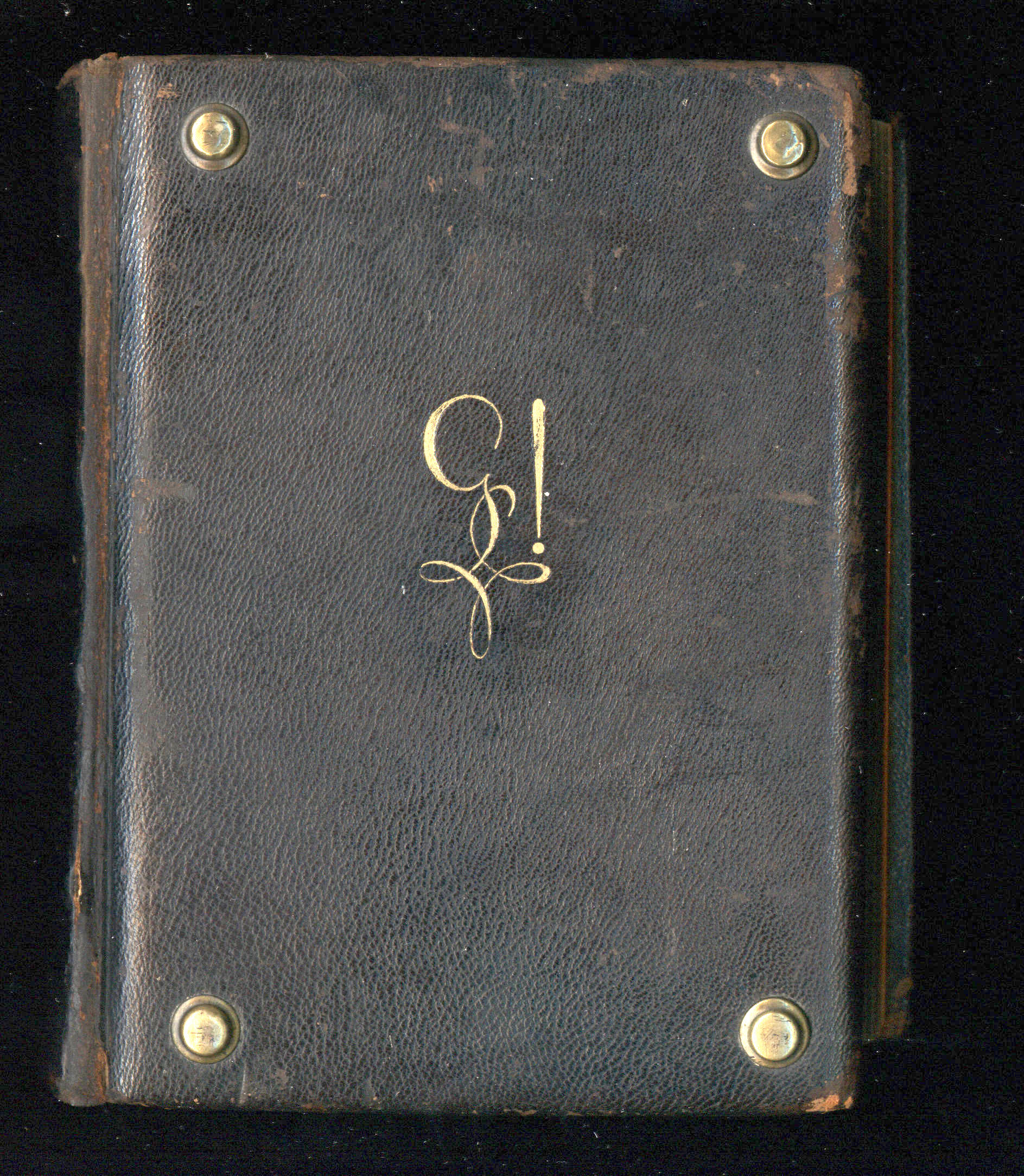
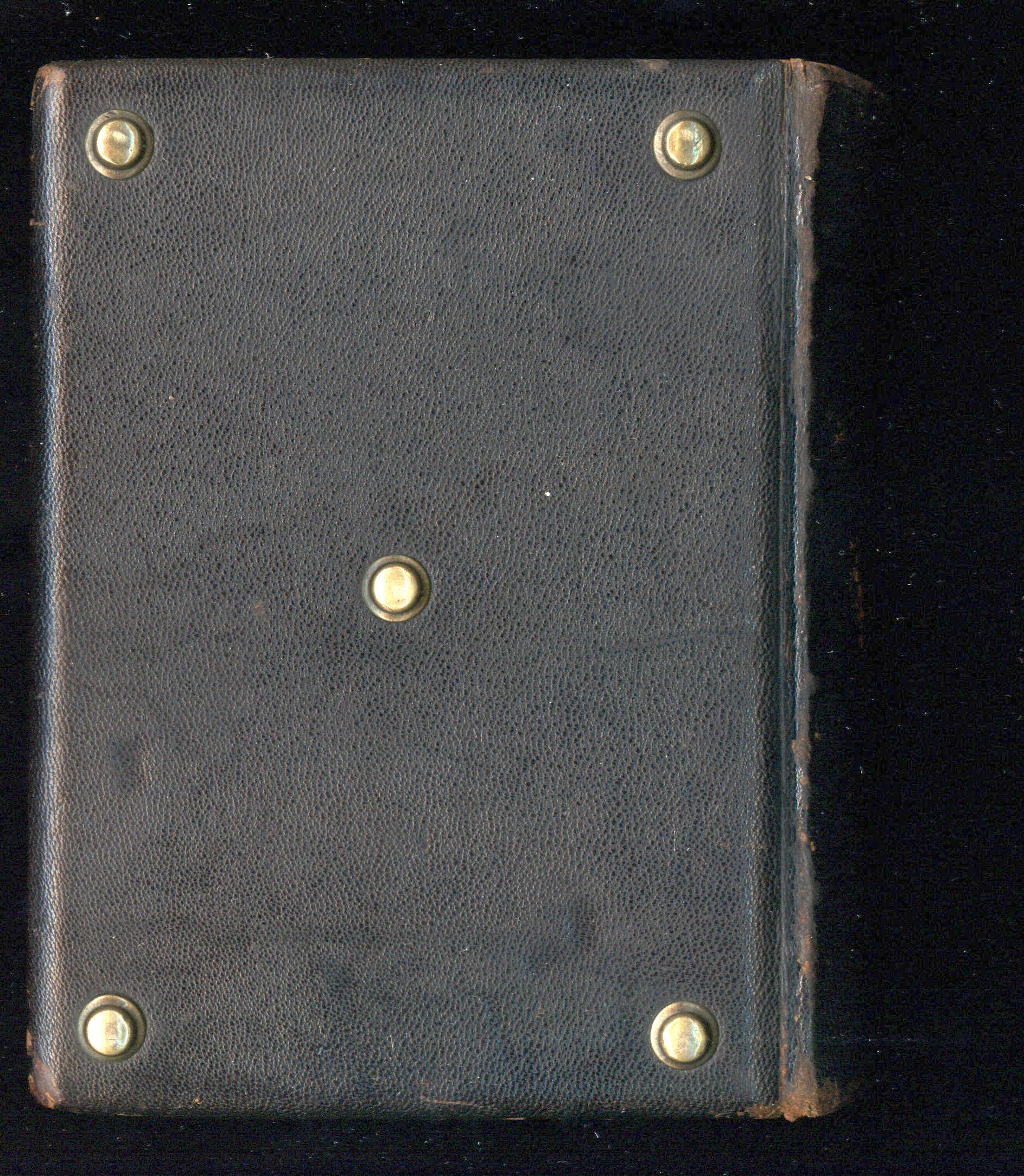
Front and back cover of a Kommersbuch song book with biernagels fitted on it

Biernagels (German: Biernagel, pl. Biernägel for "beer nails") are conical, hemispherical or pyramid shaped fittings on the outer covers of books used in tableround and commercium type academic feasts. Primarily biernagels are used on German song books called "Kommersbuch", which are similar to the studentencodex song books used in Belgium. Also guestbooks are sometimes fitted with biernagels.

Song books are usually kept on the table during tableround events, thus being exposed to danger of being damaged by coming into contact with spilled beer. With biernagels on it, the book cover is raised half a centimeter from the surface of the table, and thus remains mostly dry.

Also other books, that are likely to lie on dirty or wet surfaces, such as cookbooks, are sometimes seen with biernagels fitted on them.

== See also ==
- Commercium song
- Studentenverbindung
