= The Wandering Scholars =

1927 non-fiction book by Helen Waddell

The Wandering Scholars is a non-fiction book by Helen Waddell, first published in 1927 by Constable, London. It deals primarily with medieval Latin lyric poetry and the main part is a study of the goliards, which she worked on while a research scholar at Lady Margaret Hall, Oxford. The text includes many of Waddell's own translations of Latin lyrics.

The book was at first published in a small edition because it was thought not to have popular appeal, but went through three editions in the first year. It was favourably reviewed by distinguished critics including George Saintsbury, C. H. Haskins and Ferdinand Lot. In recognition of her achievement, Waddell became the first woman to be awarded the A. C. Benson Foundation silver medal by the Royal Society of Literature.

Waddell is best known for bringing to light the history of the medieval goliards in this book. She also translated a selection of their Latin poetry in the companion volume Medieval Latin Lyrics, 1929 (reissued by Penguin Books, 1952). A second anthology, More Latin Lyrics, was compiled in the 1940s but not published until after her death.

The Wandering Scholar, Op. 50 is a chamber opera in one act by the English composer Gustav Holst. The libretto, by Clifford Bax, is based on the book The Wandering Scholars.

== See also ==
- Clerici vagantes
