= Drinkers Mass =

Drinkers Masses, to include Gamblers Masses (Latin: Missa Potatorum, Officium Lusorum), was a genre of medieval Latin poetry which parodied the Roman Catholic Latin Mass in order to make fun of drinking and gambling monks and clerics. These masses were written between about 1100 and 1700 by clerici vagantes (wandering clerics) and goliards, with the first example being the gamblers mass (officium lusorum), found in the Carmina Burana. The genre is somewhat related to other medieval ecclesiastic parody, such as the Feast of Fools and the Feast of the Ass.

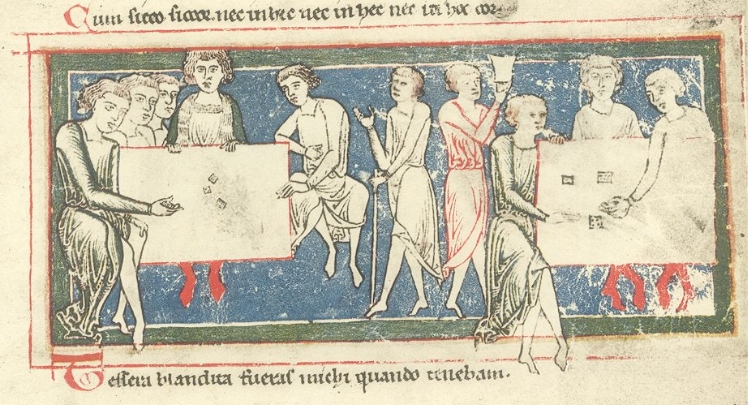
Drinking dice players, from the Carmina Burana

== Description ==
These parody masses generally follow line for line the words of the Latin Mass, as well as quotations from the Latin Vulgate. They are carefully reworded to create a parody of the Mass, with themes such as Bacchus, the god of wine, and Decius, the god of dice (Decius was also the name of a Roman emperor), replacing the "Dominus" and "Deus" (Lord and God) of the Mass. There is much imagery of dice being used in gambling, and of drinking cups, wine, and taverns, ending with losing all of one's possessions, including clothes, through drinking and gambling.

== See also ==
- Gospel According to the Mark of Silver
- Goliard
