= Ordo Monattorum =

University student organization

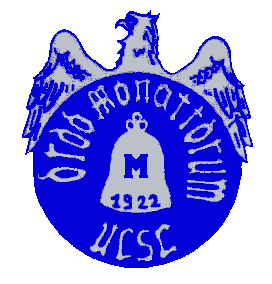
Seal of Ordo Monattorum

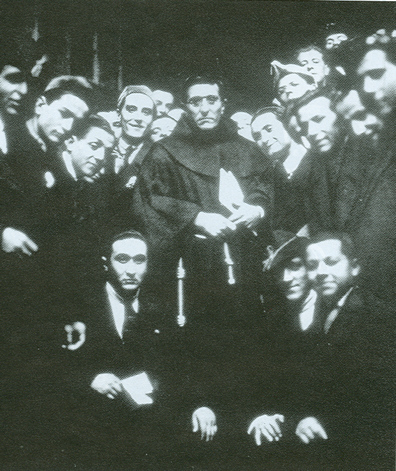
Agostino Gemelli with some "monatti"

The Ordo Monattorum is a goliardic corporation of the Università Cattolica del Sacro Cuore.

== History ==
The group was created in 1922 in Milan, only a year after the founding of UCSC. Students belonging to this order are nicknamed Monatti.

== See also ==
- Goliardia
- UCSC Student Associations
