= Bitu =

BITU or Bitu may refer to:

- Born in the U.S.A., a 1984 album by Bruce Springsteen
- Begho
- Le petit bitu
- Bustamante Industrial Trade Union in Jamaica
- Bitu (god), the doorkeeper of the underworld in Mesopotamian mythology
