= Black whale =

Black whale is a vernacular name for certain whales. It may be encountered as a colloquial or as a quasi-scientific term.

- In whaling jargon, the sperm whale (Physeter macrocephalus) of the Physeteridae was sometimes known as the "black whale"
- "Black whale" is a name for a presumed right whale species in the Balaenidae. It was also called "northern right whale" but has more recently been separated into:
  - North Atlantic right whale (Eubalaena glacialis)
  - North Pacific right whale (Eubalaena japonica)
- The Black Whale, a 1934 German film
- Im schwarzen Walfisch zu Askalon (German for In the Black Whale of Ascalon), a commercium song by Joseph Victor von Scheffel.
