= Sittning =

Student event in Sweden and Finland

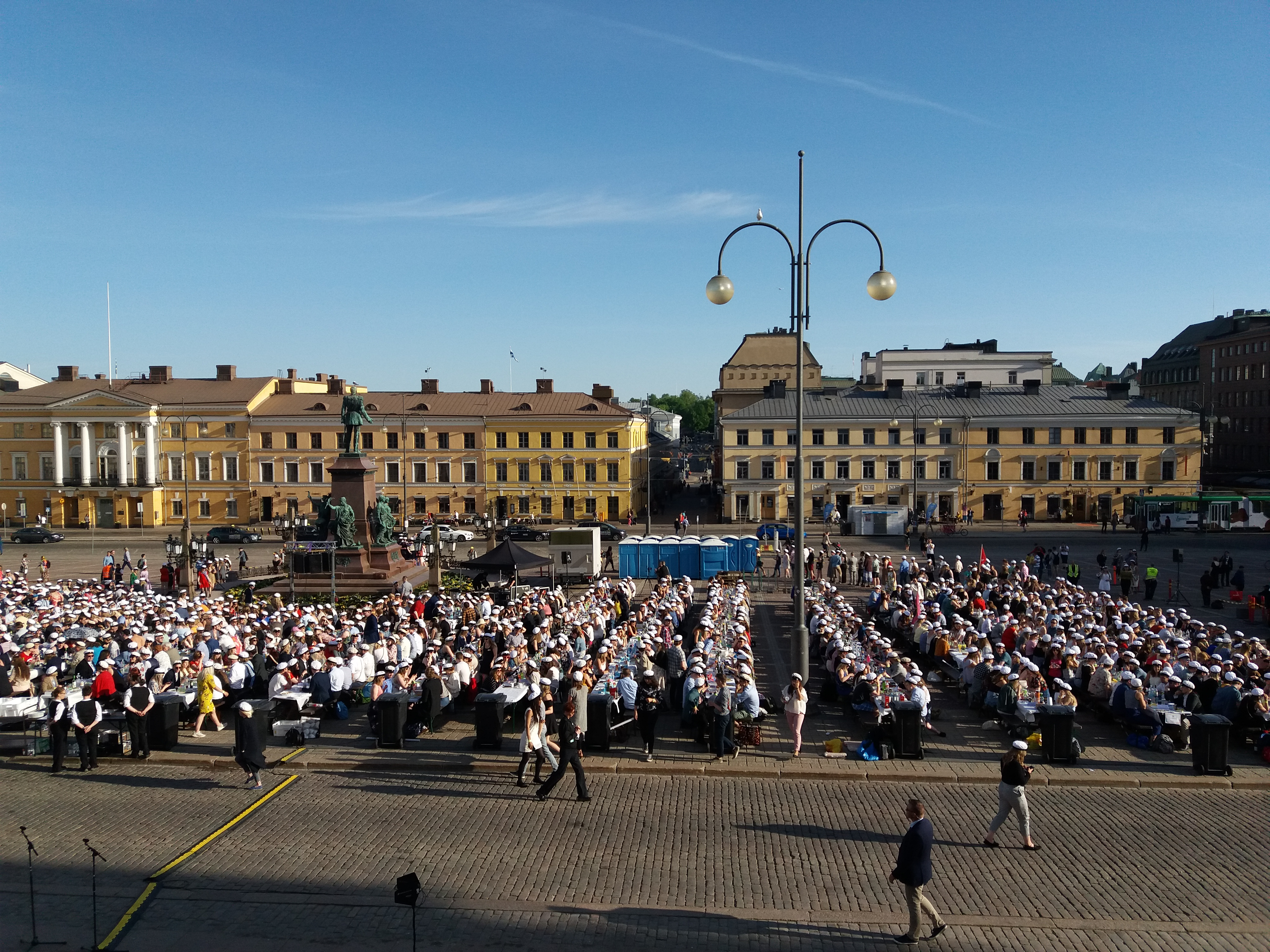
A large-scale outdoor sittning at the Senate Square in central Helsinki in 2018.

A sittning (Note: Literally 'sitting'. Often shortened to sits or sitz. Finnish: sitsit. The word sitsit in Finnish is grammatically plural and refers to the entire event. The singular word would be sitsi but this form is not used in practice, as is common with words referring to formal events in Finnish.) is in Sweden and Finland a seated meal held within a set time frame. In restaurants it may refer to a seating, i.e. the time given for a crowd to have their meal. The term is also used to denote the part of a party that is a seated meal. Though it can refer to any kind of meal, it is often used to refer to a student sittning.

== History ==
There is no confirmed origin for the tradition of sittning: one theory says it stems from the British cavalry, where soldiers ate and drank after hard working days. The tradition then moved to Sweden and from there to Finland. The sittning culture in Finland started blossoming in the 1990s and 2000s.

Various festivities resembling the sittning are known in European student culture, such as the cantus, the tableround in universities in middle and eastern Europe, and the slightly more formal commercium in universities in middle and northern Europe, as well as the "dining in" at the military of the United States and the United Kingdom.

== Student sittning ==
A student sittning in Sweden or Finland is usually a dinner had at the student union's or nation's property, usually a pub room, or banquet hall if the student union is fortunate enough to have one. In academic environments some of the tradition is carried on even after one is no longer a student.

=== Dress code ===
The dress code is different depending on the occasion; everything from white tie to student boilersuit can be the evening's dress code. Sittnings often have themes, and the guests are encouraged to dress to match the theme.

=== The meal and drinks ===
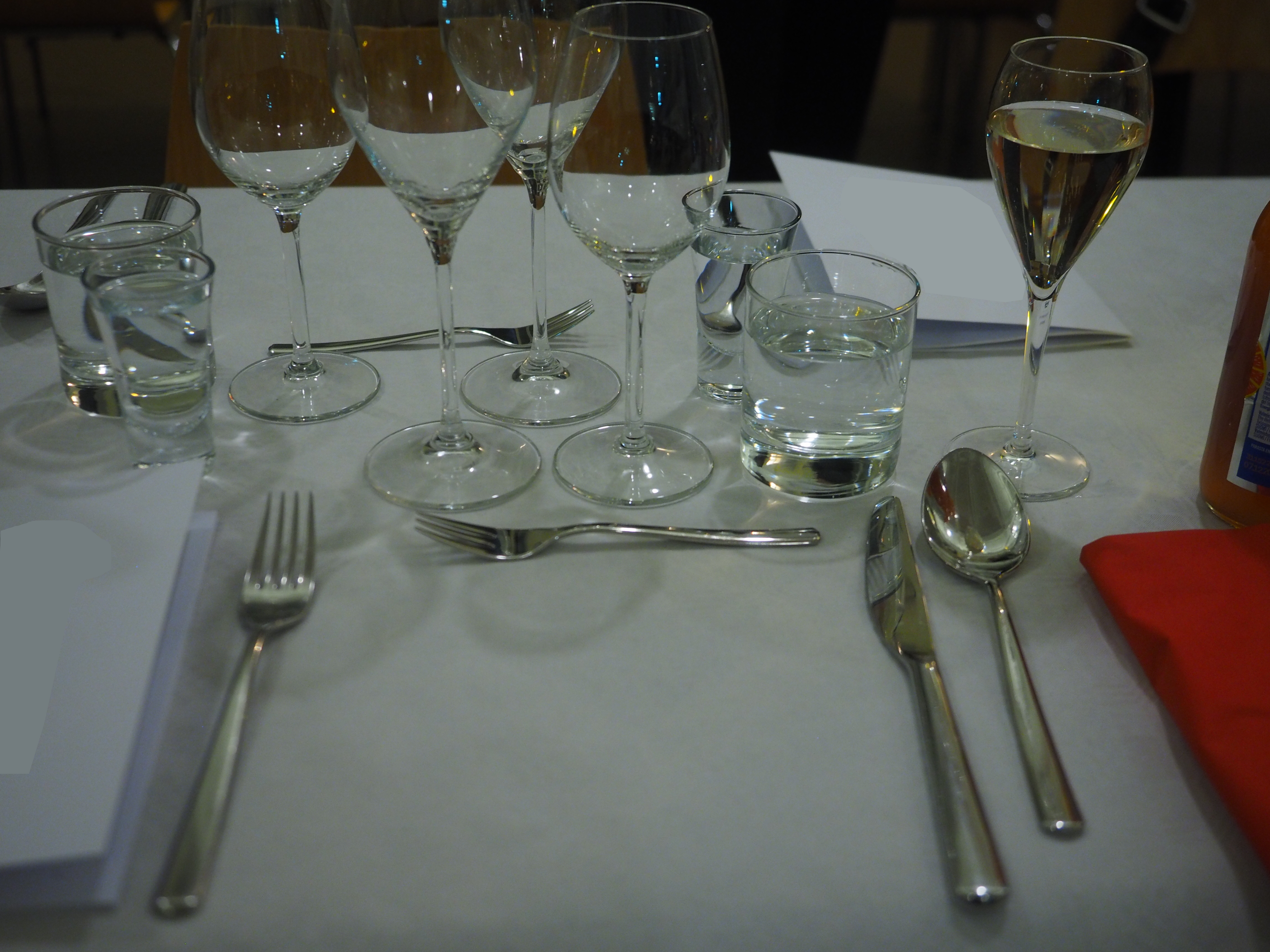
Cutlery at a sittning, prior to the serving of food and drinks

The meal is prepared and served by students who often spend some time working at their union or nation. The number of dishes vary, but three courses is common, and alcohol is usually included in the price (beer or cider and snaps along with punsch). If snaps or punsch is not included, there will often be tickets for sale.

=== Singing ===
A vital part of a sittning is singing. The guests are usually given a booklet with songs that will be sung during the sittning. Everyone sings when a song is brought up, and songs are often related to the current progress of the sittning. Sittnings often begin with a certain song and end with another, songs are sung when drinking snaps, and there is often a song to honor the students serving and cooking. These songs differ depending on student union or nation. The songs may range from traditional to pop music, depending on the formality of the occasion. If there is a theme for the evening, it is possible to write new lyrics to existing songs based on it. In some locations, such as Uppsala or Stockholm, it is common for a sittning to end with the song "O gamla klang och jubeltid". During the last verse of the song, the guests stand on their chairs and after the song is finished one is no longer supposed to sit down.

During Finnish-language sitsit, many of the classic Swedish drinking songs are also sung in Swedish or in translated versions. In more formal sitsit, academic and patriotic songs, such as De Brevitate Vitae, Finlandia Hymn and the Jäger March are sung.

=== Toasts ===
After a song is sung, glasses are usually raised for a skål, or in English, a toast. Many places in Sweden and Finland have an etiquette concerning how to toast. In Uppsala, for example, the tradition is usually to raise a glass and to nod first to one's table partner (for ladies, the gentleman to the left, and for gentlemen, the lady to the right), then with the next person who is not one's table partner, and lastly with the person sitting across the table. After the three nods, one drinks and then nods to the same people in the reverse order. Finally, the glass is set back down on the table (ladies first). During some sittnings this begins very formally but then becomes more and more relaxed.

=== Seating ===
Often sittnings will involve sitting at long tables (in Swedish, långbord). In some cases, the guests will be designated seats (in Finnish, plassi), if possible every other lady and gentleman, and shifted on opposite sides of the table so that the ladies will sit opposite a gentleman, and vice versa.

=== Other entertainment ===
Other performances such as short spex (theatre), choir performances, speeches, and pretty much anything that may be entertaining to the guests may also take place during the sittning.

=== Toastmaster ===
The sittning is usually guided by a toastmaster and often also by a sånganförare ('song master'; laulunjohtaja, 'song director' in Finnish). The toastmaster keeps note of and introduces everyone who wants to perform something, communicates with the serving staff, and generally makes sure that the sittning runs smoothly. The sånganförare chooses which songs to sing and starts them off.

=== Differing traditions ===
Some students are relaxed about all the traditions that come with sittning. Others recognise that the traditions in fact enhance the festivity of the sittning and adhere to them. When Swedish students from different sittning traditions meet they will often find each others traditions quite remarkable.

In Finland, breaking the code of the evening may result in a punishment for the person(s) in question. The punishment is usually decided by the toastmaster or song master. The people punished must, for example, sing a song in front of others. There are varying attitudes towards this custom and in some places it has been abolished.

=== Gask and ball ===
A gask or a ball usually starts with a sittning and then continues on with a party after the sittning is over. Usually there is dancing, either to live music or a DJ, and a pub. Formal etiquette suggests that a gentleman at a ball with a sittning should dance the two first dances with his table partner (the lady on the right), the following two dances with the lady who was on his left, and finally two dances with the lady sitting across from him.
