= Spex (theatre) =

Swedish and Finnish form of comedy theatre

Spex (speksi in Finnish) is a form of amateur comedy theatre act performed by university students in Sweden and parts of Finland. University cities, such as Gothenburg, Lund, Uppsala, and Linköping have long-running traditions of spex. The word is likely derived from abbreviated student slang for spektakel (spectacle; scene; show). This form of comedy theatre may also be known as gyckel (buffoonery), when performed at a gask.

== History ==
The first spexes were performed possibly as early as the 16th century in Uppsala. Local students were practising Latin by writing short plays in Latin, called spexes. These performances were performed by male-only casts, as all the students at that time were male, and the tradition of gender switching for roles continues today. Over the next 300 years the spexes developed into their modern form, which emerged around 1850 at Uppsala University.

The first spexes in Finland were performed at the Helsinki University of Technology at the beginning of the 20th century.

== Characteristics ==
Spexes are always amateur productions, written and performed by students, and often have a historical theme. Other prominent features of spexes are the musical-like mix of song (mostly popular hits with new parodic lyrics) and dialogue (often featuring rhyme), and heavy use of satire and parody.

One of the distinguishing features of spex as opposed to other forms of theatre is the central prominence of audience participation. The audience have established lines, shouting "Restart!" (Swedish: Omstart!/Omtag!) or "One more time!" (Swedish: En gång till!) if they consider the current scene to be of particularly high quality. The actor is then expected to improvise the scene or punchline in a new way. There are also several other commands that the audience can give, such as demanding that the actors should perform the current scene backwards, in slow-motion, or in another language.

While spexes are typically in Swedish or Finnish, at least all Physicist Spex (Fyysikkospeksi, Aalto University, Finland) productions to date have been translated into English for a visiting performance in Stockholm, Sweden. The English translation is now also performed in Finland, to provide the unusual event of a spex aimed specifically at an audience of English-speaking students. As Swedish universities become increasingly internationalized in student life, there is a growing trend of spex performances being conducted in English. One notable example is Handelsspexet at the Stockholm School of Economics, which began writing their scripts in English for their 2021 show as early as 2020. However, the 2021 show was canceled due to the COVID-19 pandemic. It was eventually performed in 2022 instead, fully transitioning to English for that year's production. At the KTH Royal Institute of Technology in Stockholm, Sweden, the first Spex in English was performed in 2022 by the English Theater Improv Club.

== Gyckel ==
When performed at a Gask, this form of theatre may be known as gyckel or jyckel. A gyckel typically involves a group of students singing a song or performing a play lasting no more than a few minutes. There are several unwritten rules, such as that the gyckel must have been written by the performers and be presented for the first time at the gask. The gyckel should also feature sarcastic and/or satirical humor.

At a gask with guests from different faculties it is usually expected that each faculty performs its own gyckel. Others may also report that they will be performing a gyckel to the toastmaster, who will then announce when the time has come for a certain group to perform their gyckel.
