= Richard of Poitiers =

Monk and author (died c. 1174)

Richard of Poitiers (died c. 1174), also known as Richard of Cluny, was a monk of the Benedictine abbey of Cluny, and author of a small number of historical works (including a universal chronicle), treatises and poems.

== Life ==
Little is known about the life of Richard of Poitiers beyond the barest biographical details suggested in the title and dedication prefacing his Chronica. His name, Richardus Pictauiensis, indicates that he was a native of the region of Poitou, France. He calls himself a monachus cluniacensis, an ambiguous term suggesting either that he was a monk of the Abbey of Cluny or that he was a member of the Europe-wide network of Cluniac monasteries (the Ecclesia Cluniacensis). Scholars have identified no further conclusive evidence for his life or background. On the basis of unique local material in a single manuscript of Richard's Chronica, Élie Berger concluded that he resided in a Cluniac priory on the island of Aix in Poitou. The subsequent work of I. Schnack suggested, in contrast, that Richard wrote in the scriptorium of the Abbey of Cluny. The lack of any conclusive evidence makes it difficult to resolve this disagreement. From Richard's dedication of his chronicle to Peter the Venerable, it is evident that Richard was at work by 1156, the year of Peter's death. The poems attributed to Richard's authorship include an ode to London and a condemnation of sea sickness, both of which suggest that Richard travelled beyond the confines of medieval France.

Richard of Poitiers should not be confused with Richard of Ilchester, an English contemporary who was also known as Richard of Poitiers while Archdeacon of the Cathedral of Poitiers. He should also be distinguished from King Richard I of England, whom some chroniclers of the Crusades refer to as Richard of Poitiers.

== Writings ==
=== Chronicle ===
Richard's major work bears the title Chronica Richardi Pictauiensis, monachus cluniacensis de diuersis libris collecta (The Chronicle of Richard of Poitiers, monk of Cluny, compiled from numerous sources), which draws attention to the work's nature as largely compilation.

In his dedication, Richard offers a list of sources consulted in writing his chronicle:

In this work, I excerpt from the books of Augustine, Jerome, Isidore, Theodolfus, Josephus, Hegesippus, Eutropius, Titus Livy, Suetonius, Aimoinus, Justinus (the abridger or excerptor of Pompeius Trogus), Freculphus, Orosius, Anastasius (the librarian of the Roman see), Anneus Florus, Gregory, Bede, Ado, Gildas (the historian of Britain), the monk Paul (historian of the Lombards), and of a few others.

Despite this apparent openness, Richard cites historians, such as Suetonius and Aimonius, whom he likely only knew second hand. He also does not fully reference all his sources. In addition to the sources cited explicitly, Richard's chronicle tacitly includes material from contemporary historians, such as Fulcher of Chartres' crusading history as well as fantastical literature, such as the Pseudo-Alexander's Letter from Alexander to Aristotle and Geoffrey of Monmouth's History of the Kings of England.

The diversity of material in Richard's Chronicle gives it an exotic feel for the modern reader, and the resulting work is quite unlike what a modern historian seeks to do. Richard, for example, does not attempt to come to a coherent portrait of history or distinguish true from false accounts. Instead, he juxtaposes multiple accounts in order to provide the most complete picture, even if his sources are contradictory. The reigns of kings or emperors, for example, might be recorded as having three or four different spans, depending on whether the reader wishes to follow Jerome, Josephus, Justinus or Orosius. The chronicle also contains significant prophetic material (from Biblical sources, or from Geoffrey of Monmouth's Prophecies of Merlin) and Richard repeatedly seeks to identify for the reader when these prophecies are shown to be fulfilled. This concern with prophecy is an important undertone of Richard's work and relates to a traditional Cluniac interest with deciphering the divine plan identifiable from the course of human history (see Rodulfus Glaber).

"To make provision for posterity, therefore, it pleases me to add, if not the sum of all things, then what little I am able to know about [the history] preceding our own times, and what happened during that time in different parts of the world. Though [what occurred was] often disparate, it was established under a single rational end."
Dedicatory Epistle, Chronicle of Richard of Poitiers

As Richard himself states (see sidebar), the Chronicle sought to describe all of human history (as then understood) from Adam and Eve in the Garden of Eden until his own time (in the 1160s and 1170s). In doing so, Richard compiled what modern historians have called a "universal history". Universal chronicles are similar to modern-day textbooks of Western Civilization in the breadth of material covered. Richard's text strongly focuses on Christian and French subjects, but it also provides a wide range of material on Classical and Ancient Middle Eastern history. Such information was necessary for a Christian reader to understand Biblical history or the Classical texts still circulating during the Middle Ages.

=== Other historical works ===
Richard compiled a Catalogue of Popes whose brief entries provided basic information about the time and duration of their papacy, their nation of origin, and distinguishing events (such as miracles performed, synods held). Subsequent writers extended this text into the thirteenth century and their extensions were incorporated into later chronicles. I. Schnack has argued that this text, when taken together with Richard's treatises on the diocesan and cardinal clergy of the city of Rome, is an important source for understanding attitudes towards the developing college of cardinals.

E. Berger assigns an additional work, A Lament upon the Destruction of Castle Julius, to Richard's authorship. It is a brief description of the siege and capture of a French castle, which Berger identifies as Châtel-Aillon, and other local history relating to the region around Aunis, France.

=== Treatises ===
Richard's two brief descriptions of the Roman clergy are entitled, "On the seven bishops who are the vicars of the pope" and "On the seven bishop, deacons ... who assist the pope celebrate mass". These two works briefly describe those holding religious office who are fit in dignity to serve alongside the pope in power, and in sanctity.

=== Poems ===
Although the sixteenth-century bibliophile John Bale attributes seven poems in total to Richard, the most recent editor of his poems (or rhythmi) is unsure which can conclusively be assigned to his authorship.

== Historiographical contribution ==
=== Relation to contemporaries ===
Richard of Poitiers was among the first of a new crop of twelfth-century French chroniclers to compose a universal history. Within French-speaking regions, the genre of the universal chronicle had languished after the Carolingian works of Frechulfus of Liseaux and Ado of Vienne. Interest in composing this kind of work was rejuvenated by Hugh of St. Victor's historiographical treatise, De tribus maximis circumstantiis gestorum, a text Richard which alludes to in his prologue. Richard also seems to take inspiration from Hugh's idea of history as a tool useful for the spiritual training of the mind and as preliminary for other study (see Hugh of Saint Victor's Didascalicon). Richard, like Hugh, calls history childish (puerile) since it is first studied by school-age children.

=== Influence on later history writing ===
The writings of Richard of Poitiers received a relatively wide circulation. In the number of extant manuscripts, his chronicle ranks alongside Otto of Freising's Deeds of Frederick Barbarossa, and Robert of Gloucester's Metrical Chronicle. The distribution of manuscripts in France, Spain, England, Italy and Germany, and its inclusion in monastic, episcopal and aristocratic libraries suggest a broad audience. Subsequent chroniclers, such as Amaury Augier, Martin of Troppau and William Rede, continued Richard's text into their own times, and Richard is noted as an accomplished historian by such humanists as Johann von Heidenberg, Conrad Gesner and Gerard Vossius. In the seventeenth century, his chronicle was conflated with the Liber Exerptionum written by Richard of Saint Victor, a misunderstanding that was often repeated until the eighteenth century, when the publication of extracts of Richard's chronicle, first by Edmond Martène and later by Luigi Muratori, made this error evident. These early editors judged Richard's Chronicle to be overly derivative and edited only the concluding portions of his chronicle.

A complete edition of the work has never been finished, but is currently under development by Marc Saurette (Carleton University) and Matthew Ponesse (Ohio Dominican University).

== See also ==
- Peter the Venerable
- Hugh Primas

== Bibliography ==
=== Editions and translations ===
- BERGER, Élie, ed. Appendix to « Richard le Poitevin, moine de Cluny, historien et poète ». In, Notice sur Divers Manuscrits de la Bibliothèque Vaticane. Bibl. des Écoles françaises d'Athènes et de Rome. Fasc. 6. Toulouse : A. Chauvin & Fils, 1879, pp. 45–140.
- BOUQUET, Martin, ed. "Ex Chronico Richardi Pictaviensis, monachi Cluniacensis." In Recueil des historiens des Gaules et de la France. Paris, 1781; rpt. 1869, VII, 258; IX, 21; X, 263; XI, 285; XII, 411–421.
- MARTÈNE, Edmond, and André DURAND, eds. Veterum scriptorum et monumentorum ecclesiasticorum et dogmaticorum amplissima collectio. 9 vols. Paris, Montalant, 1724–1738, V, col. 1160–1174.
- MURATORI, Ludovicus, ed. Antiquitates Italicae medii aevi. 4 vols. Milan, 1738–1743, IV, col. 1075–1104.
- WAITZ, Georg, ed. "Ex Richardi Pictaviensis Chronica." In Monumenta Germaniae Historica Scriptores (SS in folio), Hanover, 1882 (reprint 1925), vol. XXVI, (Ex rerum Francogallicarum scriptoribus), p. 74.

=== Secondary sources ===
- É. BERGER, 'Richard le Poitevin, moine de Cluny, historien et poète', in Notice sur Divers Manuscrits de la Bibliothèque Vaticane. Bibliothèque des Écoles françaises d'Athènes et de Rome, fasc. 6, Toulouse : A. Chauvin & Fils, 1879, pp. 45–140.
- F. CAIRNS, "The addition to the Chronica of Richard of Poitiers," Mittellateinisches Jahrbuch 19 (1984), pp. 159–161.
- H. KÜHL, "Zur Überlieferung und Rezeption der Weltchronik Richards von Cluny," in Aus Überrest und Tradition. Festschrift für Anna-Dorothee von den Brincken, (ed. P. Engels) Lauf : Pegnitz, 1999, pp. 73–92.
- M. SAURETTE, "Tracing the Twelfth-Century Chronica of Richard of Poitiers, Monk of Cluny," Memini. Travaux et documents, Bulletin de la Socitété d'Études médiévales du Québec 9–10, (2005/2006), pp. 303–350.
- I. SCHNACK, Richard von Cluny, seine Chronik und sein Kloster in den Anfängen der Kirchenspaltung von 1159. Ein Beitrag zur Geschichte der Anschauungen von Kardinalskolleg und Papsttum im 12. und 13. Jahrhundert (Historische Studien, 146), Berlin : Ebering, 1921.
- B. SCOTT, "Some Poems Attributed to Richard of Cluny," in Medieval Learning and Literature. Essays presented to Richard William Hunt (ed. J. J. G. Alexander), Oxford : Oxford University Press, 1976, pp. 181–199.
