= Le petit bitu =

Le Bitu is a book which compiles a register of numerous commercium songs. As an important part of student folklore, it is considered a must-have for students who want to be involved in societies in the French-speaking part of Belgium.

Le Bitu was revived as the Petit Bitu in the 80's by Pierre-Noël "Pernod" Boonen and Michel "Mamelle" Henry de Generet, who allegedly spent nights printing the first versions on stencils. Nowadays, a society of Université catholique de Louvain, the Academicus Sanctae Barbae Ordo, manages the publishing of what is now known as the Bitu Magnifique.

Known as Le Petit Bitu at the University of Louvain, the students of the University of Liège read the same book, there known as Le Petit Bitu Illustré.

Its Flemish equivalent is the Studentencodex.
