= UCSC Student Associations =

UCSC Student Associations are students' group of Università Cattolica del Sacro Cuore. They organize cultural and social activities among the students of the university. Some associations are linked to Italian political parties, others are nonpartisan.

== History ==
Università Cattolica del Sacro Cuore hosts over 50 student organizations, covering a wide range of interests. The first corporation of UCSC was Ordo Monattorum, which was founded in 1922. There are different religious associations like Communion and Liberation, Fuci and Unione Giuristi Cattolici Italiani. In the 1968 was founded ULD - Studenti di Sinistra which was a protagonist of the protests of 1968 in Italy. Since 1968, many associations are linked to the Italian parties.

== Function ==
Every 2 years students elect their representatives belonging to different associations. Student representation is regulated in 3 university bodies: EDUcatt, CUS Milano and school councils.

== List of Student Associations ==
In the 5 campuses there are a lot of student associations.

=== Milan Campus ===
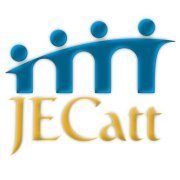
Seal of JECatt

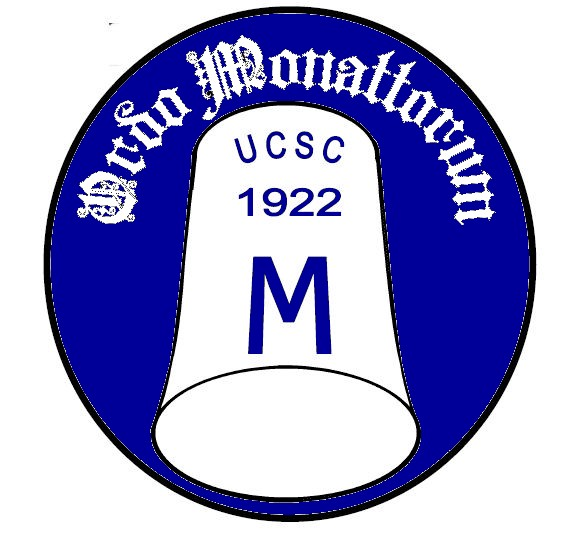
Seal of Ordo Monattorum, the first Corporation of UCSC

- AIESEC
- Ateneo Studenti
- Athenaeum
- Azione Universitaria - Movimento della Libertà
- Boulevart
- Centocanti
- Circolo Tocqueville
- Comunicando
- Comunità Antagonista Padana
- C.U.I.B. (Comitato Universitario Iniziative Di Base) d’Avanguardia
- Elsa - The European Law Students' Association
- Exchange Students And Erasmus Guide
- Formica democratica
- Giovani per EXPO 2015 Cattolica
- Gruppo Co-Raggio
- FUCI Gruppo "Giuseppe Lazzati"
- Il Cavallo Rosso
- Il Circolo Università Cattolica
- Il Fatto
- UniLab
- JECatt, junior enterprise of UCSC
- Morozzo della Rocca
- Movimento Universitario Padano
- Movit - Movimento per la Vita
- Ordo Monattorum
- Presenza studentesca Africana Dell'Università Cattolica
- Studenti Amici UC
- Studenti per le Libertà
- U.L.D. - Studenti di sinistra

=== Brescia Campus ===
- Ateneo Studenti
- CUT La Stanza
- Dafne
- Elea
- FUCI - Gruppo di Brescia
- L'Idea
- Pier Giorgio Frassati
- UCID Giovani Brescia

=== Rome Campus ===
- Ateneo Studenti
- ECO - EsserCi Ora
- FUCI
- Gli amici di Bacco
- Gruppo Phos-Laboratorio della fede
- I Soliti Ignoti
- Il Giornalone
- Know How
- MoVit - Movimento per la Vita
- Sognatori in cantiere
- Sorrisi Gemelli
- Studenti Protagonisti
- UCSC Erasmus Appointment

=== Piacenza-Cremona Campus ===
- ASUP - Associazione sportiva universitaria europea
- Ateneo Studenti
- Athenaeum
- Dialogo e rinnovamento
- FUCI UCSC Piacenza
- Giovani Europei
- Movimento Universitario Padano
- SMINT
- RINIA
- Triskele Di Azione Universitaria

== Journals ==
Student organizations publish several magazines: L'Eco del Batacchio (Ordo Monattorum), Il Pungolo (Azione Universitaria), L'Urlo (ULD), Inside (Unilab) and Strike (Ateneo Studenti).
