= Cantus =

Activity organized by fraternities

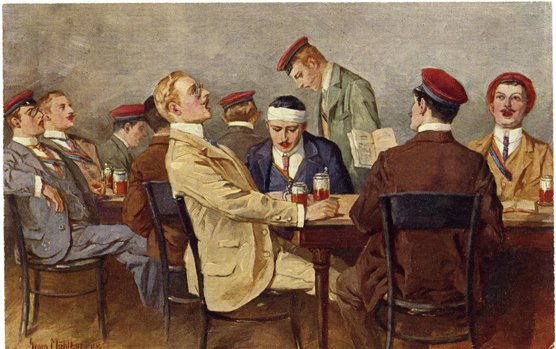
"Cantus" (c. 1900), painting by Georg Mühlberg

A cantus (Latin for "singing", derived from cantare) is an activity organised by Belgian, Dutch, German, French, and Baltic fraternities. A cantus mainly involves singing traditional songs and drinking beer. It is governed by strict traditional rules. The use of this dates back a few centuries and was inspired by German student organisations; however, some of the songs that are sung date back to the Middle Ages. Cantus probably shares its roots with commercium, sitsit and tableround.

Currently, the world record for biggest traditional cantus is in the hands of the Eurekaweek, based in Rotterdam, who welcomed 4594 officially registered guests during their 2019 cantus and 6200 in 2023.

== Codex ==
The songs are compiled in what the students refer to as the codex, which contains the club anthems of most student organisations and hundreds of songs in various languages, such as Dutch, French, English, German, Latin and Afrikaans. They usually have easy and familiar melodies. Nearly all of the songs predate World War II and refer to either drinking, the student's (love) life or the history and past of the home country, city or region. For this reason, some songs are typically sung more by students of one city or another, e.g. students from Ghent will not sing songs about Leuven and vice versa, or they will simply replace instances of one city with another. Also due to the old nature of the songs, some of them have in recent years been controversial because they are perceived to be sexist, right-wing or racist.

In Antwerp, Hasselt, Leuven and Aalst, the codex used is that published by the KVHV (Katholiek Vlaams Hoogstudentenverbond or Catholic Flemish Students Union). However, due to disagreements between KVHV and LOKO (umbrella organisation for student associations in Leuven), there was a new codex developed for Leuven in 2023, called 'Leuvens Liedboek'. In Brussels, the Flemish codex is published jointly by Polytechnische Kring and Brussels Senioren Konvent. In Ghent they also used to use the KVHV codex but since 2012 the SC Ghent (Studentikoos Centrum Ghent) has started to publish a codex catering more specifically to the student societies in Ghent. And at the end of that same year the SC Ghent started publishing a codex for the societies in West Flanders, mainly Courtrai.

The French-speaking students from Brussels use the Carpe Diem published by the Guilde Polytechnique or Les Fleurs du Mâle published by the Union des Anciens Etudiants de l'ULB. Those who are from Catholics highschools and universities of Brussels and Wallonia mostly choose Le Bitu Magnifique published by the Academicus Sanctae Barbae Ordo.

The biggest Belgian codex is the Florex published by the Corporation Brabantia Bruxelliensis, both in French and Dutch, with more than 2300 pages divided into two parts.

== Structure of a cantus ==
The cantus is led by the senior. In most cases, the senior is the praeses (president) of the student organisation that organises the cantus. He or she is responsible for keeping order at the cantus and can punish people who disrupt it. These punishments usually involve the drinking of beer in unusual, humorous or sometimes degrading ways if the culprit has committed a grave offence. The rest of the attending people are called the 'corona' (Latin for 'circle'). The senior can be aided by the ab actis and the cantor (Latin for 'singer'). Another group of people at a cantus with a special status are the so-called proseniores (singular: prosenior), former presidents of the student's club.

A special group at the cantus are the so-called 'schachten' (in Dutch) or 'bleus' (in French). They often are freshmen or first-year students and have the lowest status at the cantus itself, but students can also decide to join the club later in their studies. Some clubs even include special rites for attaining the position of schacht, with the preceding status of fetus. The schachten are, among other things, responsible for the distribution of the beer. They are not part of the corona and are supervised by the schachtenmeester or schachtentemmer in less (Dutch for 'tamer of freshmen') (in French, they're called 'Président de baptême' or 'maître des bleus'), who answers only to the authority of the senior.

People at a cantus use special formulae, usually in Latin. For example, after a song, a senior can order the corona to drink collectively. They can do this by either saying 'prosit corona' (after which the corona responds with 'prosit senior') a few times, or by using the formula 'ad exercissimum sanctissimi salamandris omnes commilitones qui adsunt, surgite', to which the corona replies 'surgimus' whilst rising ('onwards to the exercise of the most sacred salamander, all of you fellow students present, rise' and 'we rise'). Then the senior has the choice of either ordering 'ad libitum' (drink as you please, which should be 'ad libidinem' in more accurate Latin) or the more famous and notorious 'ad fundum' (literally: to the bottom, or drink until the glass is empty). The corona can also start such a drinking procedure if it collectively begins with 'prosit senior'. This is usually a manner of teasing the senior or testing their ability to withstand huge amounts of alcohol.

Normally, people at a cantus are required to remain silent (although most seniors are fairly tolerant in this regard), and if they want to address the corona or the senior, they should ask the senior for permission first, by asking 'senior, peto verbum' (senior, I request to speak, lat. "I request a word"). They can reply by 'habes' (lat. "you have it") or 'non habes' (lat. "you do not have it"). Most of the time the request is granted. At a cantus, people wear hats and sashes that tell something about their status in student life (e.g. broad sashes for members of the presidium, small sashes around the right shoulder for commilitones and small sashes around the left shoulder for the schachten). Not all student clubs hold on to this tradition, however. In some towns the use of hats and/or sashes is identified with the extreme-right.

== See also ==
- Tableround (University)
- Belgian Codex (in French)
- Commercium
