= Norma Burrowes =

Irish coloratura soprano

Norma Burrowes (born 24 April 1944) is an Irish coloratura soprano, particularly associated with Handel and Mozart roles.

== Life and career ==
Born in Bangor, County Down, Northern Ireland, Burrowes studied at The Queen's University of Belfast and then at Royal Academy of Music with Flora Nielsen and Rupert Bruce-Lockhart. She made her professional debut with the Glyndebourne Touring Opera Company, as Zerlina, in 1970. The same year, she made her debut at the Royal Opera House in London, as Fiakermilli, and at the Glyndebourne Festival, as Papagena. She also sang in various productions with the English Opera Group, including Henry Purcell's The Fairy-Queen, King Arthur, and Dido and Aeneas.

Burrowes joined the English National Opera in 1971, and quickly began to appear on the international scene, notably at the Salzburg Festival, the Paris Opéra, and the Aix-en-Provence Festival. She made her Metropolitan Opera debut in 1979 as Blondchen.

She began her career singing mostly soubrette roles, such as Blonde, Susanna and Despina; but she gradually expanded to light coloratura parts, such as Adina, Norina, Marie, Oscar, Nanetta and Zerbinetta, later adding more lyrical roles such as Pamina, Juliette and Manon. She also excelled in operas by Purcell, Handel, and Haydn, in which she can be heard on several recordings.

From 1969 to 1980 she was married to the conductor Steuart Bedford, with whom she recorded the role of Alison in Holst's The Wandering Scholar.

Burrowes retired from the stage in 1982. She married former tenor Emile Belcourt, and in 1992 joined him at the University of Saskatoon as a vocal coach. In 1994 they resettled with their family in Toronto, where Burrowes is currently a member of the vocal faculty at York University.

== Selective discography ==
- Purcell The Fairy Queen: English Chamber Orchestra/Benjamin Britten; rec. 1970 (Decca)
- Vaughan Williams The Pilgrim’s Progress: LPO/Adrian Boult; rec. 1970-71 (EMI)
- Holst The Wandering Scholar: English Opera Group/Steuart Bedford; rec. 1974 (EMI)
- Purcell Dido and Aeneas: Aldeburgh Festival Strings/Steuart Bedford; rec. 1975 (Decca)
- Orff Carmina Burana: Brighton Festival Chorus, Royal Philharmonic Orchestra/Antal Doráti; rec. 1975 (Decca)
- Poulenc Gloria: CBSO/Louis Frémaux; rec. 1976 (EMI)
- Fauré Requiem: CBSO/Louis Frémaux; rec. 1977 (EMI)
- Handel Acis and Galatea: English Baroque Soloists/John Eliot Gardiner; rec. 1978 (DG Archiv)
- Mozart Die Entführung aus dem Serail: The Academy of St Martin in the Fields/Sir Colin Davis; rec. 1978 (Philips)
- Handel Semele: English Baroque Soloists/John Eliot Gardiner; rec. 1983 (Erato)

== Sources ==
- Baker's Biographical Dictionary of 20th Century Classical Musicians, ed. Laura Kuhn. New York: Schirmer Books, 1997.
- Britten, Benjamin (2012). Reed, Philip; Cooke, Mervyn (eds.). Letters from a Life: The Selected Letters of Benjamin Britten, Volume VI, 1966–1976. Woodbridge: The Boydell Press. ISBN 978-1-84383-725-1.
- Grove Music Online, Elizabeth Forbes, Oxford University Press, 2008.
- "Norma Burrowes (Soprano)". bach-cantatas.com.
