= The Venetian (play) =

1931 play by Clifford Bax

- Original language: English
- Written by: Clifford Bax
- Genre: Historical

Premiere
- Date: 25 February 1931
- Place: Little Theatre, London

The Venetian is a 1931 historical play by Clifford Bax based on the story of Renaissance Italian noblewoman Bianca Cappello.

"The Venetian" opened February 25, 1931 on the West End for an 86 performance run which transferred from the Little Theatre to the Apollo. Headlined by Margaret Rawlings as Bianca Cappello, Alastair Sim as Cardinal Ferdinando de Medici, and Wilfred Walter as Francisco de Medici, the production's cast also included Ivan Brandt, John Clements, Esme Hubbard, and Catherine Lacey. The play would transfer to Broadway in the autumn of 1931 subsequent to a tryout engagement at the Chicago Little Theatre: however its run at the Theatre Masque (Manhattan) would end after nine performances. The play was the first starring role for Alastair Sim and would remain his sole American theatrical credit.

"The Venetian" had a limited-run West End revival in 1940, playing February 14–24 at St Martin's Theatre with headliners Sylvia Coleridge as Bianca Cappello and Wilfred Walter who reprised his 1931 role of Francesco de Medici. The production's cast also included Gerald Cross, Helen Goss and - in his evident West End debut - Hugh Griffith.

== Bibliography ==
- Wearing, J.P. The London Stage 1930-1939: A Calendar of Productions, Performers, and Personnel. Rowman & Littlefield, 2014.
