= Commercium song =

Traditional academic song

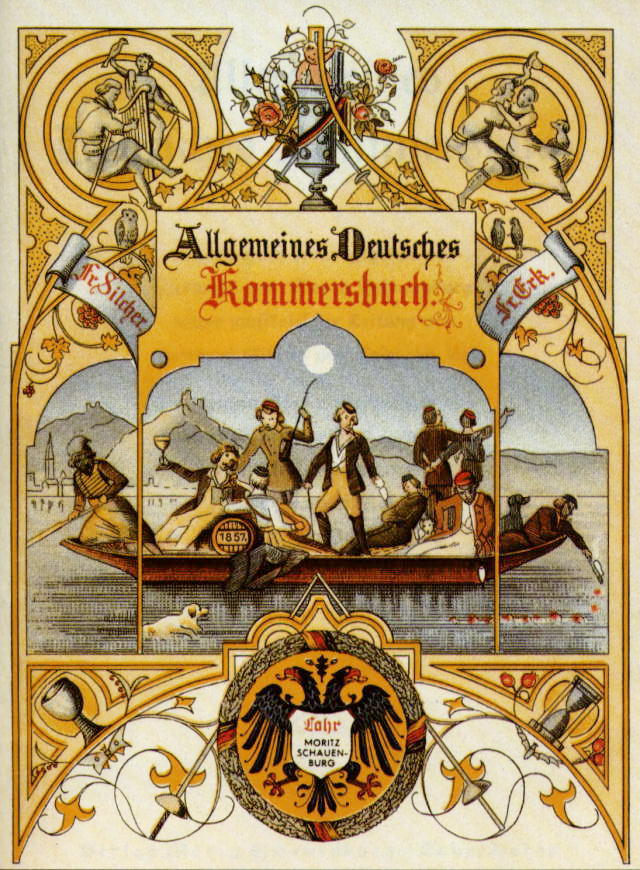
Allgemeines Deutsches Kommersbuch ("General German Commercium Songbook"), cover sheet of 1858

Commercium songs are traditional academic songs that are sung during academic feasts: commercia and tablerounds.

Some very old commercium songs are in Latin, like Meum est propositum or Gaudeamus igitur.

In some countries, hundreds of commercium songs are compiled in commercium books.

- Allgemeines Deutsches Kommersbuch (Germany)
- Le petit bitu (Belgium)
- Studentencodex (Belgium)
- Carpe Diem (Belgium)
- Codex Studiosorum Bruxellensis (Belgium)

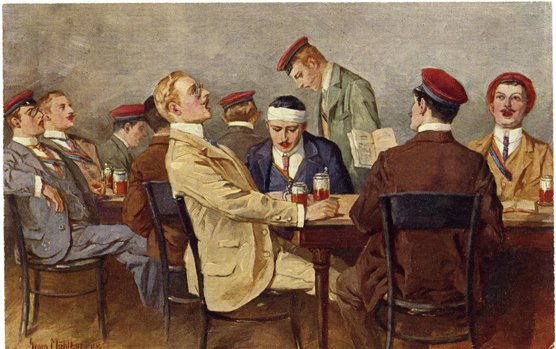
German fraternity students singing a commercium song during a tableround (Kneipe)

== See also ==
- De Brevitate Vitae
- Academic Festival Overture
- Im schwarzen Walfisch zu Askalon
- Biernagel
