= The Rose Without a Thorn =

- Original language: English
- Written by: Clifford Bax
- Genre: Historical

Premiere
- Date: 6 November 1933
- Place: Duke of York's Theatre, London

The Rose Without a Thorn is a 1933 historical play by the British writer Clifford Bax. It portrays the courtship and marriage of Henry VIII and his fifth wife Catherine Howard.

It ran in the West End for 128 performances, debuting at the Duke of York's Theatre before transferring to the Vaudeville Theatre. The cast was headed by Frank Vosper as Henry VIII and also included Joan Maude, Alastair Sim, Lawrence Hanray and Fabia Drake.

In 1947 it was adapted by the BBC into a television film of the same title starring Arthur Young and Victoria Hopper as Henry and Catherine.

== Bibliography ==
- Wearing, J.P. The London Stage 1930-1939: A Calendar of Productions, Performers, and Personnel. Rowman & Littlefield, 2014.
