= Allgemeines Deutsches Kommersbuch =

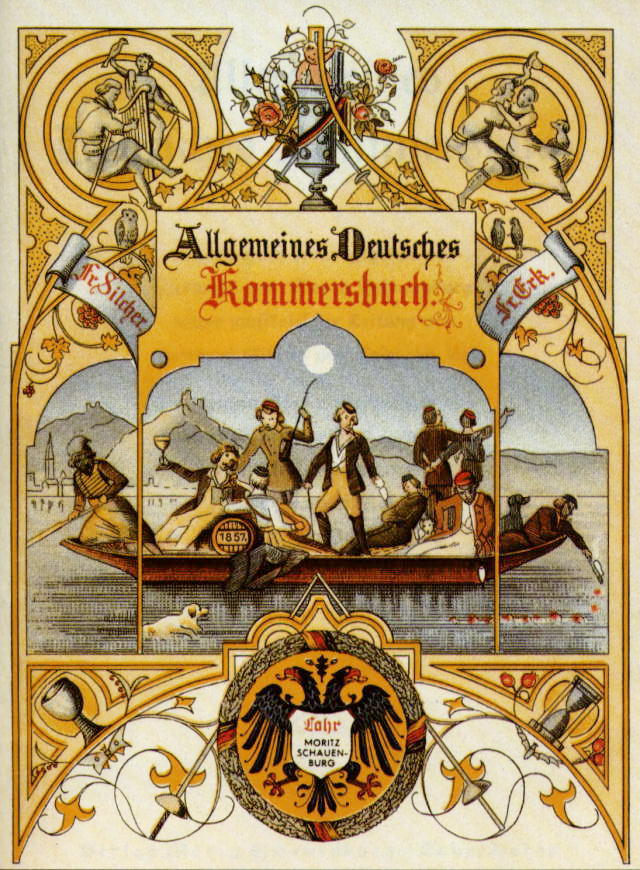
Allgemeines Deutsches Kommersbuch ("General German Commercium Songbook"), cover sheet of 1858

The Allgemeines Deutsches Kommersbuch (ADK) or Lahrer Kommersbuch is a commercium book in Germany with songs for student fraternities. It was first published in 1858 and came up to its 166th edition in 2013. It is the German equivalent of the Flemish studentencodex.
