= Gospel According to the Mark of Silver =

The Gospel According to the Mark of Silver is a work from the Carmina Burana later used to satirise Pope Leo X (1513–1521), who was famous for his profligate spending of church money. While Leo was also criticized by ecclesiastical officials after his death, the Gospel was a product of the Goliard movement.

== Text of the Gospel ==
At that time, the Pope said to the Romans, "When the son of man comes to the seat of our majesty, first say, `Friend, why have you come?' But if he continues knocking without giving you anything, throw him out into the outer darkness." And it came to pass that a certain poor cleric came to the Curia of the Lord Pope and cried out, saying, "Do you, at least, have mercy on me, you doorkeepers of the Pope, for the hand of poverty has touched me. I am indeed needy and poor. Therefore, I beg you to come to my aid." But when they heard him they were exceeding angry, and they said, "Friend, you and your poverty can go to hell. Get thou behind me, Satan, because you do not smell of money. Amen, amen, I say to you, you shall not enter into the joy of your lord [the Pope] until you pay your last farthing." So the poor man went away and sold his coat and his shirt and everything he owned and gave it to the cardinals and doorkeepers and chamberlains. But they said, "What is this among so many?" They threw him out, and he went off weeping bitterly and inconsolably. Later on, a certain rich cleric came to the Curia. He was gross and fat and swollen, and had committed treacherous murder. He bribed first the doorkeeper, then the chamberlain, then the cardinals. But they put their heads together and demanded more. However, the Lord Pope heard that his cardinals and ministers had been lavishly bribed by the cleric, and he was sick even to death. So the rich man sent him medicine in the form of gold and silver, and straightway he was healed. The Lord pope summoned his cardinals and ministers and said to them, "Brethren, be vigilant lest anyone deceive you with empty words. My example I give unto you, that you might grab just as I grab."

== Historical significance of the Gospel ==
As a single entity, the Gospel was not influential or important. It was only one of many competing satires of papal luxury. However, the work is indicative of the Goliard movement as a whole, and is often used as an example of the sociopolitical situation in the later half of the twelfth century. Although it is fairly short, the Gospel's scathing commentary was typical of the time, and its sentiments (against abuses of monetary power, such as papal decadence or simony) are reflected in many other poems of the Middle Ages, including The Apocalypse of Bishop Golias and The Simonie (also known as Poem on the Evil Times of Edward II)
