= Im schwarzen Walfisch zu Askalon =

German academic commercium song

- Commercium song
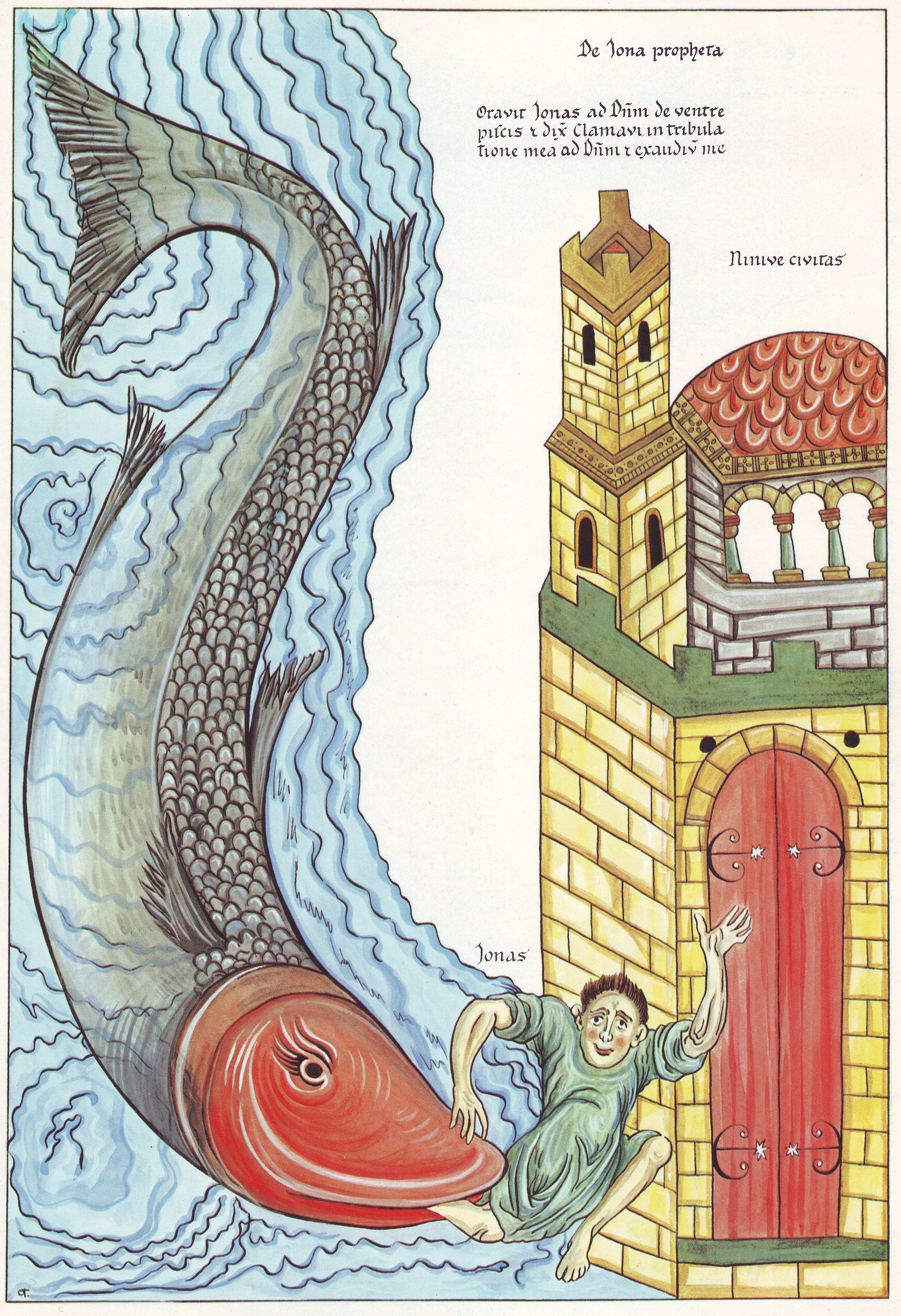
- Jonah and the fish in Nineveh, Hortus deliciarum, of Herrad of Landsberg, around 1180
- English: "In the Black Whale of Ascalon"
- Other name: "Altassyrisch"
- Text: Joseph Victor von Scheffel
- Language: German
- Published: 1854

"Im schwarzen Walfisch zu Askalon" ("In the Black Whale of Ascalon") is a popular academic commercium song. It was known as a beer-drinking song in many German speaking ancient universities. Joseph Victor von Scheffel provided the lyrics under the title Altassyrisch (Old Assyrian) 1854, the melody is from 1783 or earlier.

== Content ==
The lyrics reflect an endorsement of the bacchanalian mayhem of student life, similar as in Gaudeamus igitur. The song describes, with some references to the Classics, an old Assyrian drinking binge of a man in an inn. The tables are made of marble and the large invoice is being provided in cuneiform on bricks. However the carouser has to admit that he left his money already in Nineveh. A Nubian house servant kicks him out then and the song closes with the notion, that (compare John 4:44) a prophet has no honor in his own country, if he doesn't pay cash for his consumption. Charles Godfrey Leland has translated the poems among other works of Scheffel. Each stanza begins with the verse "Im schwarzen Walfisch zu Askalon, but varies the outcome. The initial Im is often stretched for humorous effect. Some of the stanzas:

Im schwarzen Walfisch zu Askalon
Da trank ein Mann drei Tag',
Bis dass er steif wie ein Besenstiel
Am Marmortische lag.

...

In the Black Whale at Ascalon
A man drank day by day,
Till, stiff as any broom-handle,
Upon the floor he lay.

...

Im Schwarzen Walfisch zu Askalon,
da bracht' der Kellner Schar,
In Keilschrift auf sechs Ziegelstein
dem Gast die Rechnung dar.

...

Im schwarzen Walfisch zu Askalon
wird kein Prophet geehrt,
und wer vergnügt dort leben will,
zahlt bar, was er verzehrt.

In the Black Whale at Ascalon
The waiters brought the bill,
In arrow-heads on six broad tiles
To him who thus did swill.

...

In the Black Whale at Ascalon
No prophet hath renown;
And he who there would drink in peace
Must pay the money down.

In the typical manner of Scheffel, it contains an anachronistic mixture of various times and eras, parodistic notions on current science, as e.g. Historical criticism and interpretations of the Book of Jonah as a mere shipwrecking narrative. There are various additional verses, including political parodies and verses mocking different sorts of fraternities.

The song has been used as name for traditional inns and restaurants, e.g. in Heidelberg and Bad Säckingen. In Bad Säckingen the name was used on several (consecutive) inns and for the still existing club "Walfisch Gesellschaft Säckingen" (Walfischia), honoring Scheffel.

== Mathematics International ==
There is exactly one verse for mathematics, called "International".

In ancient times, upon the door
Of Plato, there was writt'n:
“To each non-mathematicus
The entrance is forbidd'n.

The same stanza is available in further 13 languages, including Greek (Μελαίνῃ τῇ ἐν Φαλαίνᾳ (Melaínē tē en phalaína – Black in the whale)) and Volapük, which are sung one after the other.
