= Hugh Primas =

Hugh Primas of Orléans was a Latin lyric poet of the 12th century, a scholar from Orléans who was jokingly called Primas, "the Primate", by his friends at the University of Paris. He was probably born in the 1090s and may have died about 1160. Along with his younger contemporary known as the Archpoet, he marks the opening of a new period in Latin literature.

== Biography ==
The earliest and best-known source for Hugh Primas's life is in a passage added to the text of the Chronica of Richard of Poitiers for the year 1142:

In those days there flourished in Paris an academic named Hugh – whom his colleagues nicknamed 'the Primate' – wretched of aspect, misshapen of face. He had been imbued with secular literature from his earliest years, and the renown of his name grew radiant in diverse provinces, because of his elegant wit and literary sensibility. Among his colleagues he was most elegant and quick-witted in making verses, as we can see from the ones he composed by way of declamation, making all who heard them laugh aloud, about a poor cloak that a certain bishop had given him: 'From Hugh, Primate of Orléans: Hoc indumentum / tibi quis dedit? an fuit emptum?'.

Hugh is also mentioned in the Chronicle by Francesco Pippino, and he may be "Primasso", the subject of a story in Boccaccio's Decameron (1.7).

Other medieval writers say very little about his life: they knew "Primas" for his poems. Yet they rarely quoted them under his name. Modern scholars were therefore able to attribute no work to Hugh Primas until Wilhelm Meyer observed, in 1906, that one poem actually contains the name "Primas". Meyer then realised that the Oxford manuscript containing this one poem includes a collection of twenty-two others that are probably by the same author, including another seven containing the internal signature "Primas".

The twenty-three poems identified by Meyer, and edited by him in 1907, are now generally accepted as the work of Hugh Primas, though A. G. Rigg has expressed doubts about some attributions.

== Bibliography ==
- Fleur Adcock (ed. and tr.), Hugh Primas and the Archpoet. Cambridge: Cambridge University Press, Cambridge Medieval Classics 2, 1994, 152 pp., ISBN 0-521-39546-1 (Editor's page)
- Francis Cairns, "The addition to the Chronica of Richard of Poitiers" in Mittellateinisches Jahrbuch vol. 19 (1984) pp. 159–161.
- Christopher J. McDonough (ed. and tr.), The Arundel Lyrics. The Poems of Hugh Primas. Cambridge and London: Harvard University Press, Dumbarton Oaks Medieval Library, 2010, 288 pp., ISBN 978-0-674-05557-5
- F. J. E. Raby, A History of Secular Latin Poetry in the Middle Ages (Oxford: Clarendon Press, 1934. ISBN 0-19-814325-7) vol. 2 pp. 82–83.
- A. G. Rigg, "Golias and other pseudonyms" in Studi medievali 3rd series vol. 18 (1977) pp. 65–109.
