= Clifford Bax =

English writer (1886–1962)

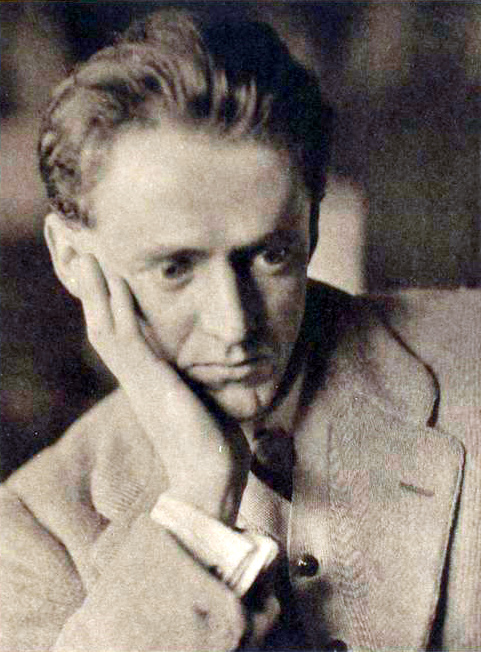
- Clifford Bax in 1916
- Born: 13 July 1886; Upper Tooting, London, England
- Died: 18 November 1962 (aged 76)
- Relatives: Arnold Bax (brother)

Clifford Lea Bax (13 July 1886 – 18 November 1962) was an English writer, known particularly as a playwright, a journalist, critic and editor, and a poet, lyricist and hymn writer. He also was a translator (for example, of Goldoni). The composer Arnold Bax was his brother, and set some of his words to music.

== Life ==
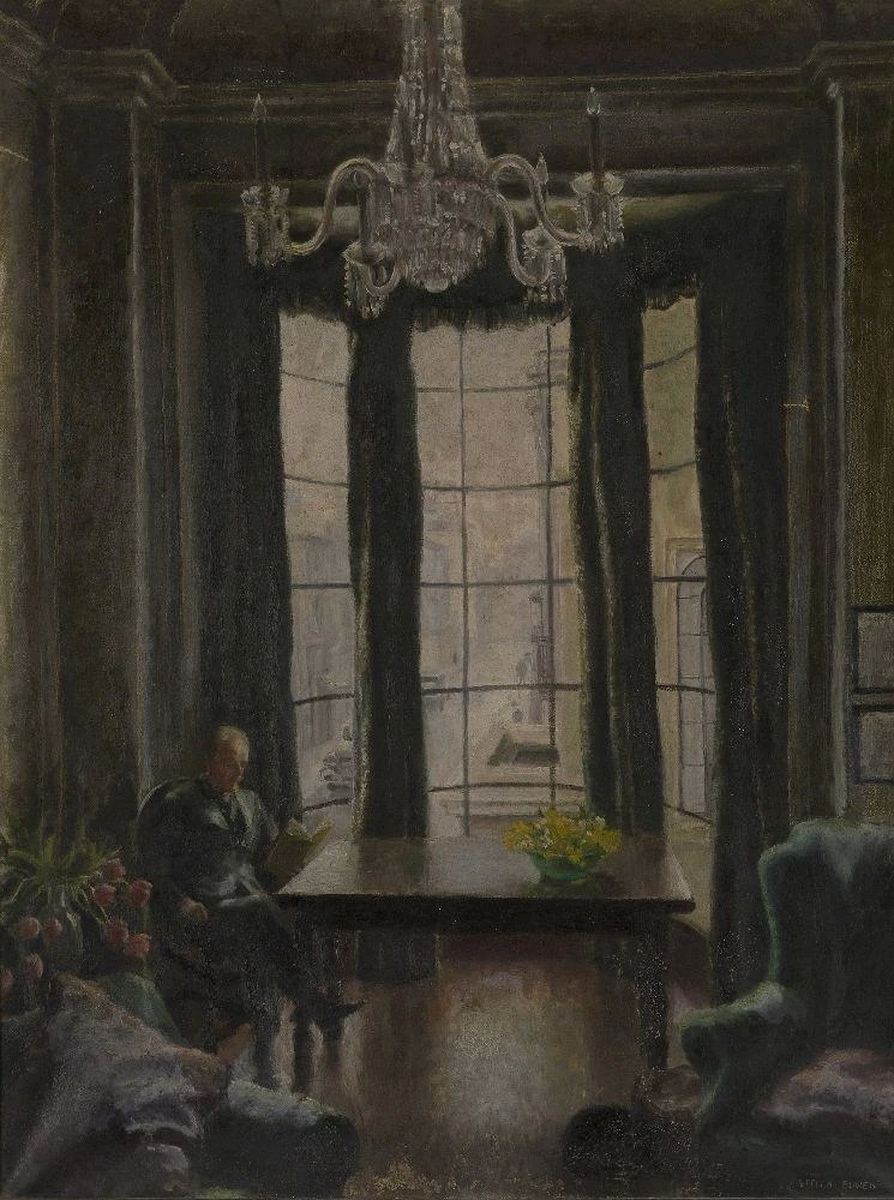
Clifford Bax at Home, by Stella Bowen

The youngest son of Alfred Ridley Bax (1844–1918) and his wife, Charlotte Ellen (1860–1940), daughter of Rev. William Knibb Lea, of Amoy, China, Bax was born in Upper Tooting, south London (not Knightsbridge, as sometimes stated). His father was a barrister of the Middle Temple, but having a private income he did not practise. In 1896 the family moved to a mansion in Hampstead. He was educated at the Slade and the Heatherley Art School. He gave up painting to concentrate on writing.

Independent wealth gave Bax time to write, and social connections. He had an apartment in Albany, the apartment complex in Piccadilly, London. He was a friend of Gustav Holst, whom he introduced to astrology, the critic James Agate, and Arthur Ransome, among others. He met and played chess with Aleister Crowley in 1904, and kept up an acquaintance with him over the years, later in the 1930s introducing both the artist Frieda Harris and the writer John Symonds to him. An early venture (1908–1914) was Orpheus, a theosophical magazine he edited. His interest in the esoteric extended to editing works of Jakob Boehme, and helping Allan Bennett, the Buddhist.

His first play on the commercial stage was The Poetasters of Ispahan (1912), and he became a fixture of British drama for a generation. He was involved in the Phoenix Society (1919–1926), concerned with reviving older plays, and the Incorporated Stage Society.

He also edited, with Austin Osman Spare, Golden Hind, an artistic and literary magazine that appeared from October 1922 to July 1924.

A cricket enthusiast, he was a friend of C. B. Fry and wrote a biography of W. G. Grace.

== Family ==
He married actress and jewellery-maker Gwendolen Daphne Bishop, née Bernhard-Smith, on 21 September 1910. Their daughter, Undine, was born 6 August 1911.

In 1927, Bax married Vera, née Rawnsley, a painter and poet (1888–1974). Rawnsley was previously married to Stanley Kennedy North, an artist, and Alexander Bell Filson Young (1876–1938), a journalist with whom she had two sons: William David Loraine Filson-Young and Richard Filson-Young; they—Bax's stepsons—were both killed in World War II.

== Works ==
- Twenty Chinese poems (1910) with Arthur Bowmar-Porter
- Poems Dramatic and Lyrical (1911) attributed (also to his brother Arnold Bax)
- The Poetasters of Ispahan (1912) play
- Friendship (1913)
- The Marriage of the Soul (1913)
- Shakespeare (1921) play (with Harold F. Rubinstein)
- The Traveller's Tale (1921) poems
- Antique Pagentry. A Book of Verse-plays (1921) Four plays
- Polly (1922) ballad opera adapted from John Gay's original libretto
- The Insect Play (1923) adaptation with Nigel Playfair
- Studio Plays: Three Experiments in Dramatic Form (1924) illustrated by Dorothy Mullock
- Midsummer Madness (1924) ballad opera
- Inland Far. A book of thoughts and impressions (1925)
- Up Stream (1925)
- Mr. Pepys (1926) ballad opera
- Many a Green Isle (1927) short stories
- Bianca Cappello (1927) biography
- Waterloo Leave (1928) play
- Square Pegs: A Polite Satire (1928) One-act plays
- Rasputin (1929)
- The Wandering Scholar (1929) libretto
- Socrates (1930)
- The Immortal Lady (1930)
- The Venetian (1931)
- Twelve Short Plays, serious and comic (1932)
- Leonardo da Vinci (1932)
- Pretty Witty Nell. An account of Nell Gwynn and her environment (1932)
- Farewell, My Muse (1932) collected poems
- The Rose Without a Thorn (1933) play
- April in August (1934)
- Ideas and People (1936)
- The House of Borgia (1937)
- Highways and Byways in Essex (1939)
- The Life of the White Devil (1940) biography of Vittoria Accoramboni
- Evenings in Albany (1942)
- Time with a Gift of Tears. A modern romance (1943) novel
- Vintage verse; an anthology of poetry in English (1945)
- The Beauty of Women (1946)
- Golden Eagle (1946) play
- The Silver Casket Being love-letters and love poems attributed to Mary Stuart (1946)
- All the world's a stage: theatrical portraits (1946) editor
- The Buddha (1947) radio play
- Day, a Night and a Morrow (1948)
- The Relapse (1950)
- Some I Knew Well (1951) memoirs
- Hemlock for Eight (1946) radio play with Leon M. Lion
- Rosemary for Remembrance (1948)
- Circe (1949) muse
- The Distaff Muse. An anthology of poetry written by women (1949) with Meum Stewart
- W.G. Grace (1952)
