= Gask =

Swedish student party

A gask, or gasque, is a kind of Swedish student party which starts with a more or less formal dinner. The word is believed to have originated from the card game Vira, popular in the 19th century.

== Background ==
In some cities, gask is generally used to refer to a party with a formal dress code. Students at Stockholm University and the Royal Institute of Technology generally use the term gasque to refer to a gask where the dress code is a student boilersuit.

In some cases, gasque might also be the name of an actual building, often a building belonging to the student union arranging the gasque, as in the case of Chalmers University of Technology in Gothenburg.

Many universities also have thematic gasques, as well as slasques (pun on "slask", 'slush, slop'), which are less tidy gatherings.

== See also ==
Sittning
