= Goliardia =

Type of Italian university student association

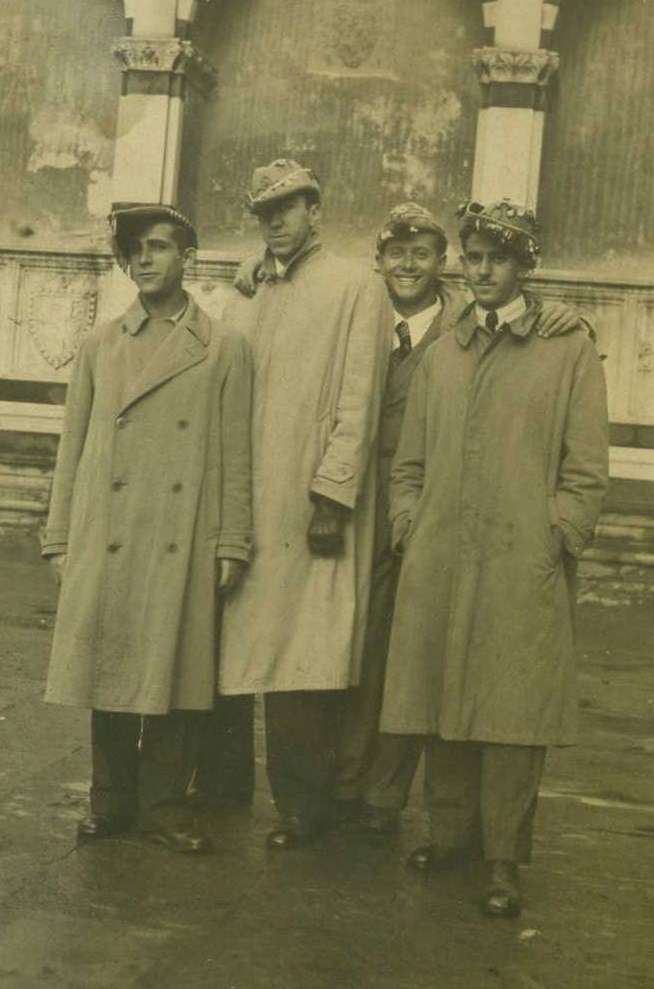
Four members of the Goliardia in 1933

Goliardia (Italian pronunciation: [ɡoljarˈdiːa]) is a type of Italian university student association, similar to the fraternities and sororities of the United States and Canada or to the Studentenverbindung in Germany. Their mythology is built around a supposed link to a group of mostly young and disaffected clergy from the 12th to 13th century. Even if their membership has never reached a large audience, the numbers have been decreasing since the postwar initiatives of keeping these clubs alive, especially considering the acts of vandalism perpetrated by its members in major Italian cities like Parma and Trieste.

== Etymology ==
The word goliard or, better, goliarda, is often considered the contraction of "Goliath Abelard". However, the word has an uncertain and debated etymology.

== See also ==
- Fraternities and sororities
- Studentenverbindung
