= Commercium =

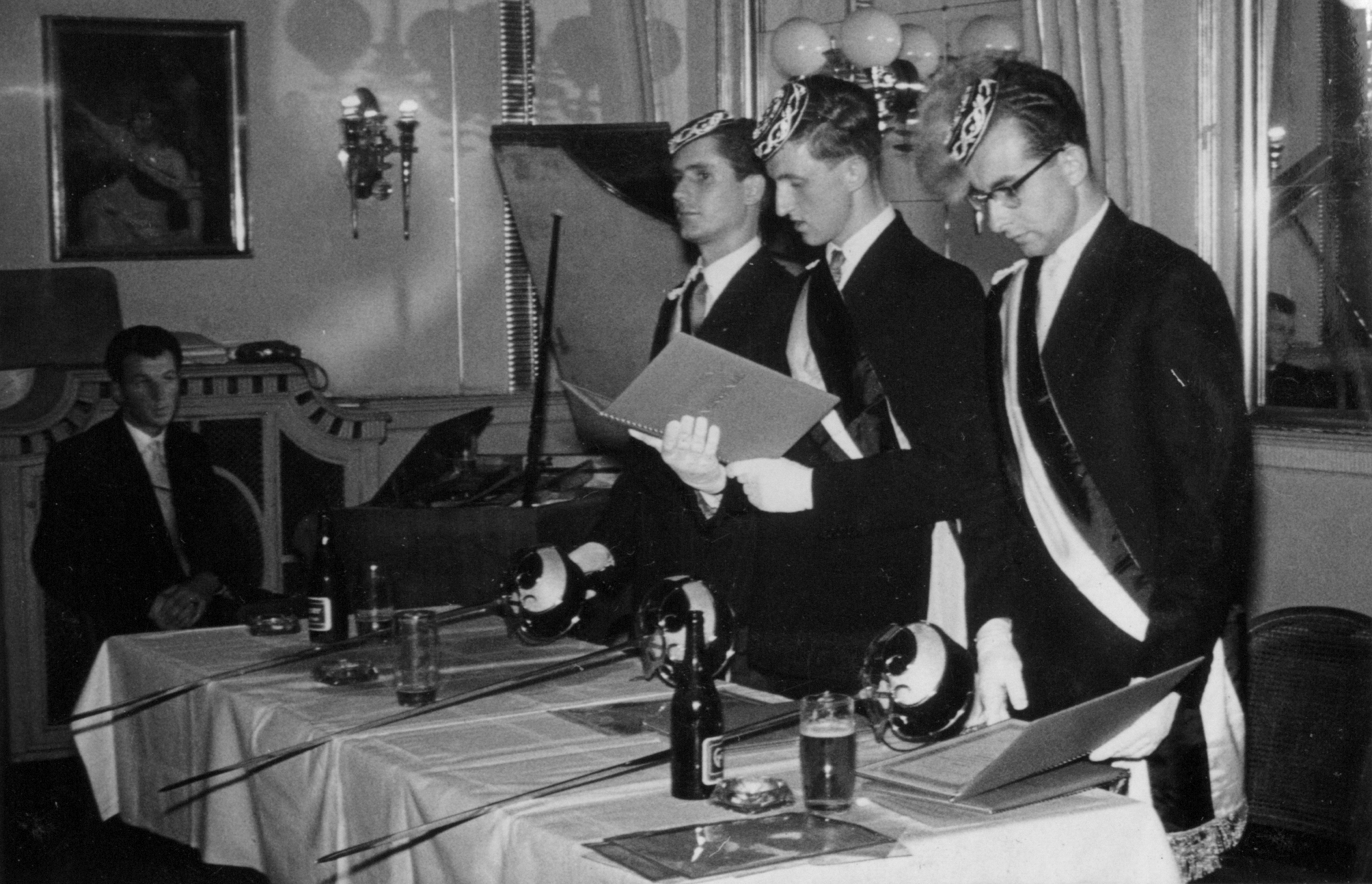
The head table of a fraternity commercium in Vienna in the early 1950s

A commercium (plural commercia) is a traditional academic feast in universities in Central and Northern European countries. In Germany it is called a Kommers or Commers. It is organised by student fraternities in Germanic and Baltic countries, as well as Poland.

At a commercium, tables are often placed in the form of a U or a W, and the participants drink beer and sing commercium songs. Strict traditional rules govern this occasion, although it may integrate theatrical and musical aspects. A commercium is the more formal form of the tableround, called Kneipe in German.

The term is derived from the French Commerce and was used for any sort of noisy event. A Commers gathering consisted of speeches, toasts and songs, sometimes along with arranged pranks The drink of preference is beer. The arrangements are governed by officials (Chargierte) elected by members of the Studentenverbindung. The event became more formalized after 1871. German associations like firefighters or Schützenvereine started to arrange commercia in the 19th century.

Customs include a salamander or Landesvater. The guests rise and having emptied their glasses hammer then three times on the table. On the death of a student, his memory may be honored with a Trauercommers. The operetta The Student Prince made German students' drinking habits famous during the prohibition period. In the last years of communist Eastern Germany, some students managed to arrange celebrations for new fraternities, e.g. Salana Jenensis in Jena and organized commercia on the Rudelsburg.

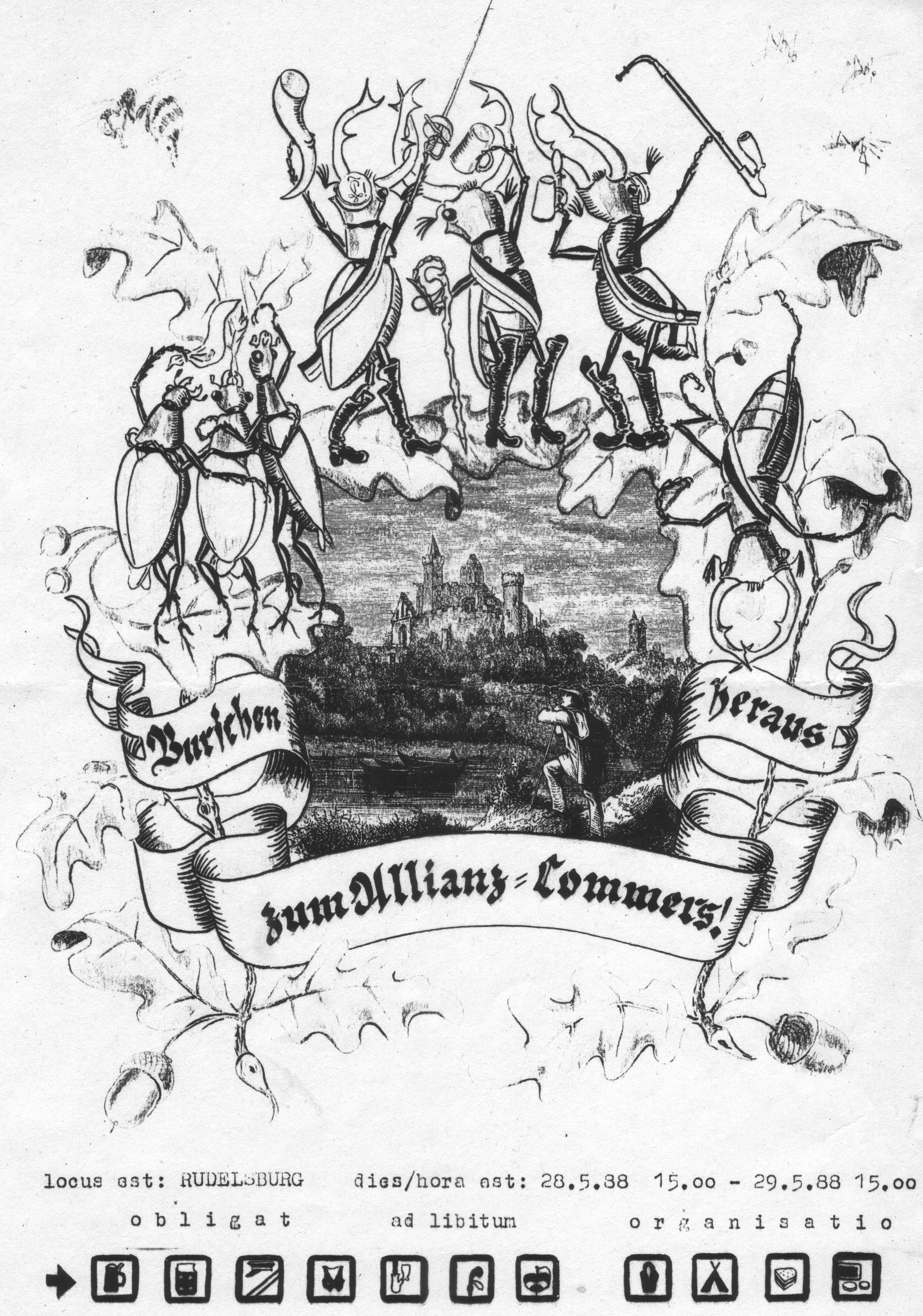
Invitation to a commercium in Eastern Germany 1988

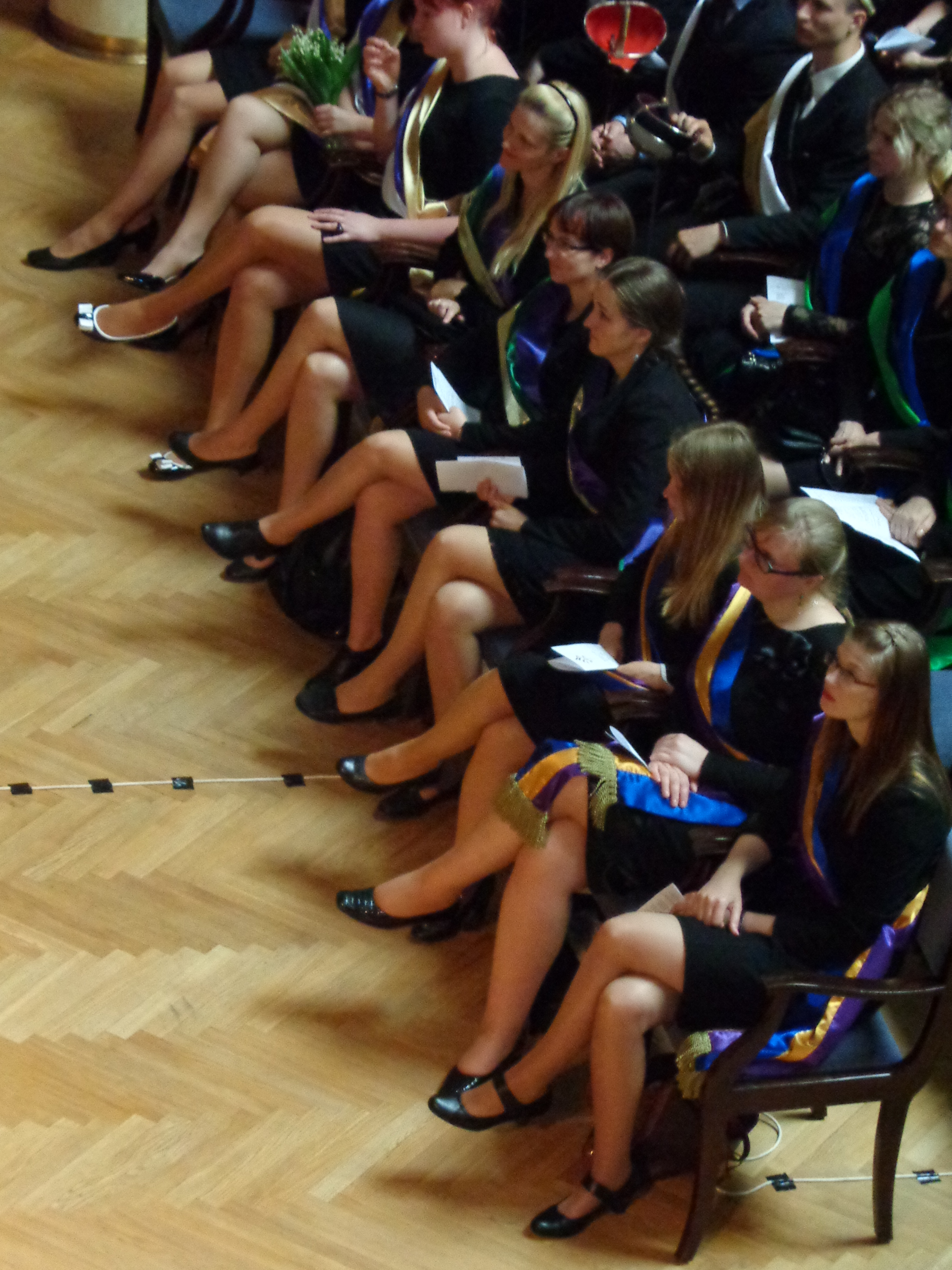
Sorority students at a commercium in Riga, 2014

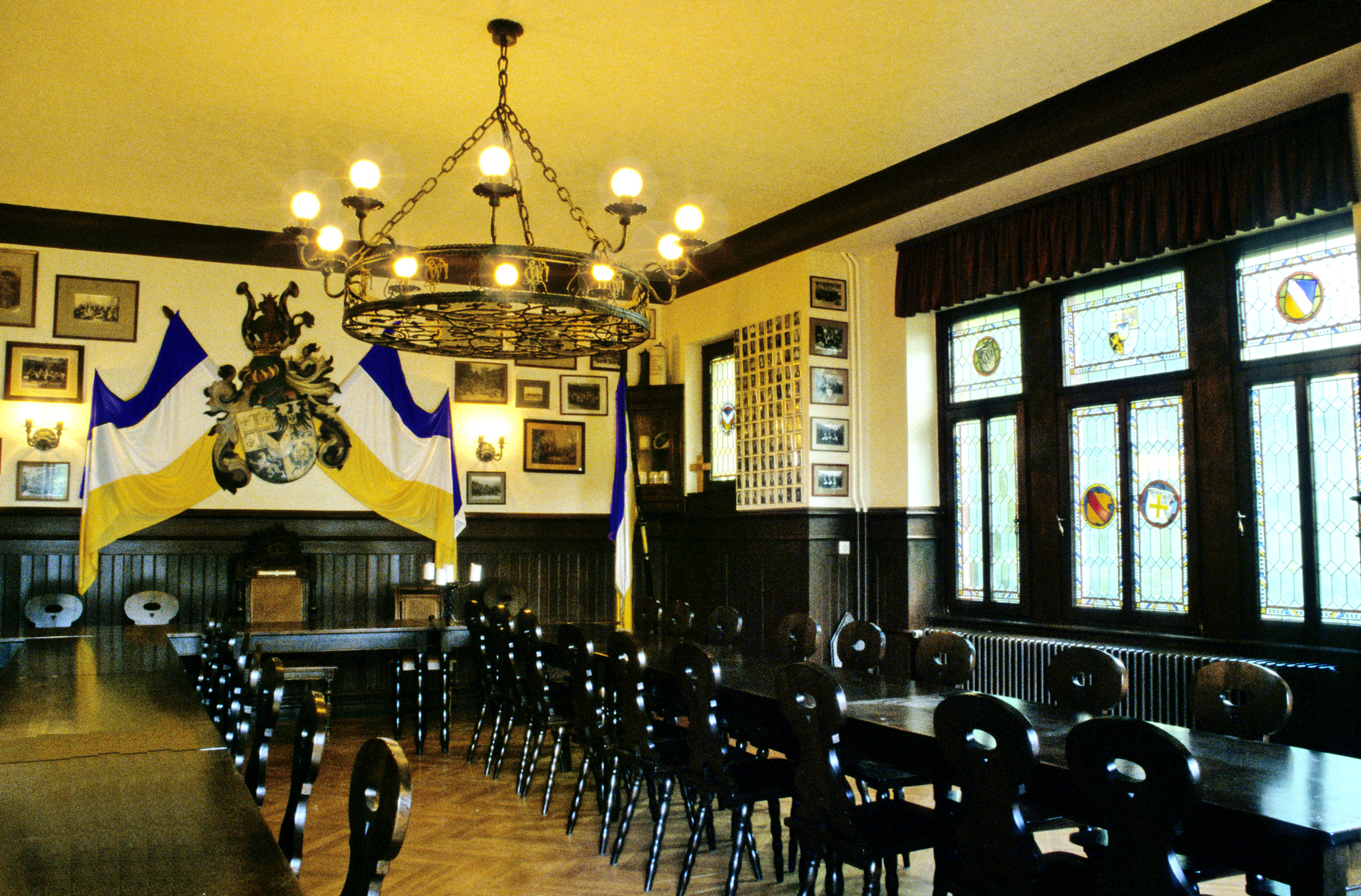
Heidelberg Wingolf's hall for commercia and roundtables

== See also ==
- Cantus
- Sitsit
- Studniówka
- Studentenverbindung
