= Studentencodex =

Most widely used commercium book in the Flemish part of Belgium

The Studentencodex is the most widely used commercium book in the Flemish part of Belgium.

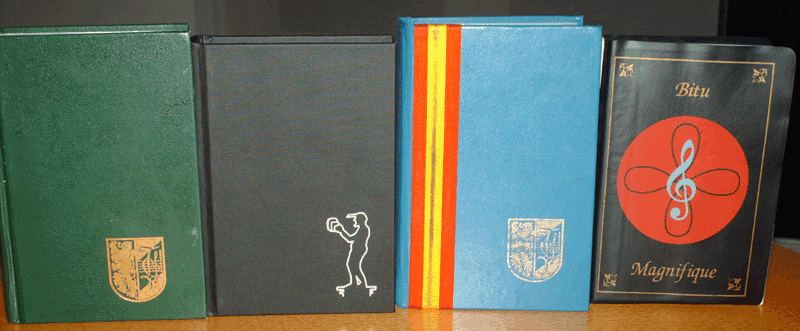
Belgian 'studentencodices'; from left to right: green KVHV-studentencodex, Codex Studiosorum Bruxellensis, blue KVHV-Studentencodex, Bitu Magnifique

Most students use the editions published by the Katholiek Vlaams Hoogstudentenverbond (KVHV), which is composed of three parts: the corpsboek with songs of the most fraternities, the clubcodex (blue pages) and a part of more than three hundred songs. It is published in two editions: one with a green cover by the KVHV of Leuven (used in the provinces of Flemish Brabant, Limburg, and Antwerp) and one with a blue cover by the KVHV of Ghent (used in East and West Flanders). Since the edition of 1993, they feature a common clubcodex and song part but have a different corpsboek.

In Brussels, students of the Vrije Universiteit Brussel and the Erasmus University College use their own codex with a black cover, which contains no religious songs in it due to the pluralistic position of these institutions of higher education.
