= Goliards =

Clerics who performed satirical poetry

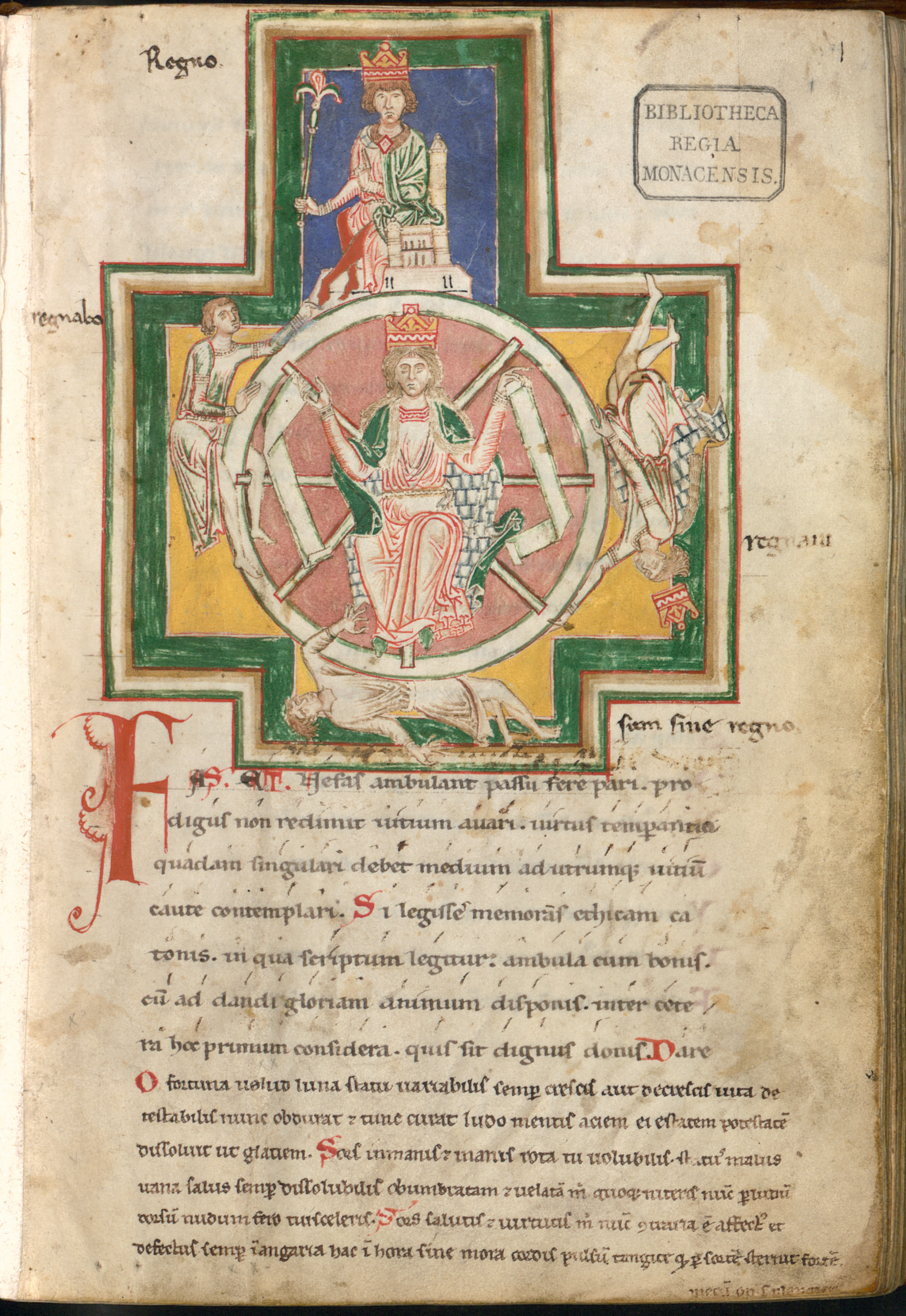
An image from the 11th-13th century. Carmina Burana, Benediktbeuern Abbey, a collection of goliard love and vagabond songs

The goliards were a group of generally young clergy in Europe who wrote satirical Latin poetry in the 12th and 13th centuries of the Middle Ages. They were chiefly clerics who served at or had studied at the universities of France, Germany, Spain, Italy, and England, who protested against the growing contradictions within the church through song, poetry and performance. Disaffected and not called to the religious life, they often presented such protests within a structured setting associated with carnival, such as the Feast of Fools, or church liturgy.

== Etymology ==
The derivation of the word is uncertain. It may come from the Latin gula, gluttony. It may also originate from a mythical "Bishop Golias", a medieval Latin form of the name Goliath, the giant who fought David, later King David, in the Bible—thus suggestive of the monstrous nature of the goliard or, notes historian Christopher de Hamel, as "those people beyond the edge of society". Another source may be gaillard, a "gay fellow".

Many scholars believe the term goliard is derived from a letter between Bernard of Clairvaux and Pope Innocent II in which Bernard referred to Peter Abelard as Goliath, thus creating a connection between Goliath and the student adherents of Abelard. By the 14th century, the word goliard became synonymous with minstrel, and no longer referred to a particular group of clergy.

== Origins of the goliardic tradition ==
The goliardic class is believed to have arisen from the need of younger sons to develop means of support. The medieval social convention of primogeniture meant that the eldest son inherited title and estate. This practice of bestowing the rights of inheritance upon the eldest son forced younger sons to seek other means by which to support themselves. Often, these younger sons went, or were sent, to the universities and monasteries of the day, where theology and preparation for clergy careers were a major focus. Many felt no particular affinity for religious office, and often could not secure an office even if they desired one because of an overabundance of those educated in theology. Consequently, over-educated, under-motivated clerics often adopted not the life of an ordered monk, but one mainly intent on the pursuit of carnal pleasures.

== Goliardic poetry ==
The goliards, as scholars, often wrote their poetry in Latin. As a kind of traveling entertainer, the goliards composed many of their poems to be sung. These poems, or lyrics, focus on two overarching themes: depictions of the lusty lifestyle of the vagrant and satirical criticisms of society and the church.

Expressing their lusty lifestyle, the goliards wrote about the physicality of love, in contrast to the chivalric focus of the troubadours. They wrote drinking songs and reveled in riotous living. Their satirical poems directed at the church were inspired by their daily worlds, including mounting corruption in monasteries and escalating tensions among religious leaders. As a result of their rebellious writings against the church, the goliards were eventually denied the privileges of the clergy. Their strained relationship with the church, along with their vagabond lifestyle, also contributed to many poems describing the complaints of such a lifestyle. One of the largest and most famous collections of goliardic poetry is the Carmina Burana, translated as "Songs from Beuern". It includes about 300 poems written mostly in Latin; "few are in Old French, Provencal and Middle German."

== Satirical poets ==
The satires were meant to mock and lampoon the church. For example, at St. Remy, the goliards went to mass in procession, with each trailing a herring on a string along the ground. The game was to step on the herring in front and keep your own herring from being trod upon. In some districts, goliards staged a celebration of the ass, in which a donkey dressed in a silly costume was led to the chancel rail where a cantor chanted a song of praise. When he paused, the audience would respond: "He Haw, Sire Ass, He haw!". The University of Paris complained:

Priests and clerks may be seen wearing masks and monstrous visages at the hours of office. They dance in the choir dressed as women, or disreputable men, or minstrels. They sing wanton songs. They eat black-puddings at the altar itself, while the celebrant is saying Mass. They play dice on the altar. They cense with stinking smoke from the soles of old shoes. They run and leap throughout the church, without a blush at their own shame. Finally they drive about the town and its theatres in shabby carriages and carts, and rouse the laughter of their fellows and the bystanders in infamous performances, with indecent gestures and with scurrilous and unchaste words.

The goliards used sacred sources such as texts from the Roman Catholic Mass and Latin hymns and played upon them to secular and satirical purposes in their poems (such as in the Drinkers Mass). The jargon of scholastic philosophy also is frequently featured in their poems, either for satirical purposes, or because these concepts were familiar parts of the writers' working vocabulary. Their satires were almost uniformly directed against the church, attacking even the pope.

== Significance ==
The word "goliard" outlived the original meaning. It was absorbed into the French and English literature of the 14th century, generally meaning jongleur or wandering minstrel, and no longer related to the original clerical association. It is thus used in Piers Plowman, and by Chaucer.

== Revisionist view ==
This belief that the goliards were the authors of vast parts of this satirical and worldly poetry that originated in the twelfth and early thirteenth century has been criticized in recent revisionist work on the grounds that most traceable goliardic poets were an integral part of church hierarchy and often worked as teachers in the secular clergy. It also claims that they had no communality nor a single provable point of contact with the historical goliards. Instead, the revisionist thesis posits that the cathedral schools of northern France were the decisive historical context of goliardic poetry. Thus, it argues that "goliardic poets" on the one hand and "goliards" on the other hand need to be strictly distinguished. This fringe view runs contrary to the conclusions drawn from established and widely accepted historical and philological research.

== Modern day ==
In modern times the Goliardia, the Italian equivalent to American student fraternities, claim to be descended from the Goliards. Even if the link is not proven, associations of students calling themselves Goliardia have been recorded throughout Italian history; Goliardata in modern Italian denotes a satirical prank or caper.

== See also ==
- Apocalypse of Golias
- Clerici vagantes
- Goliardia
- Serlo of Wilton
- Tuna (music)
