= Mono Inc. =

German gothic rock band

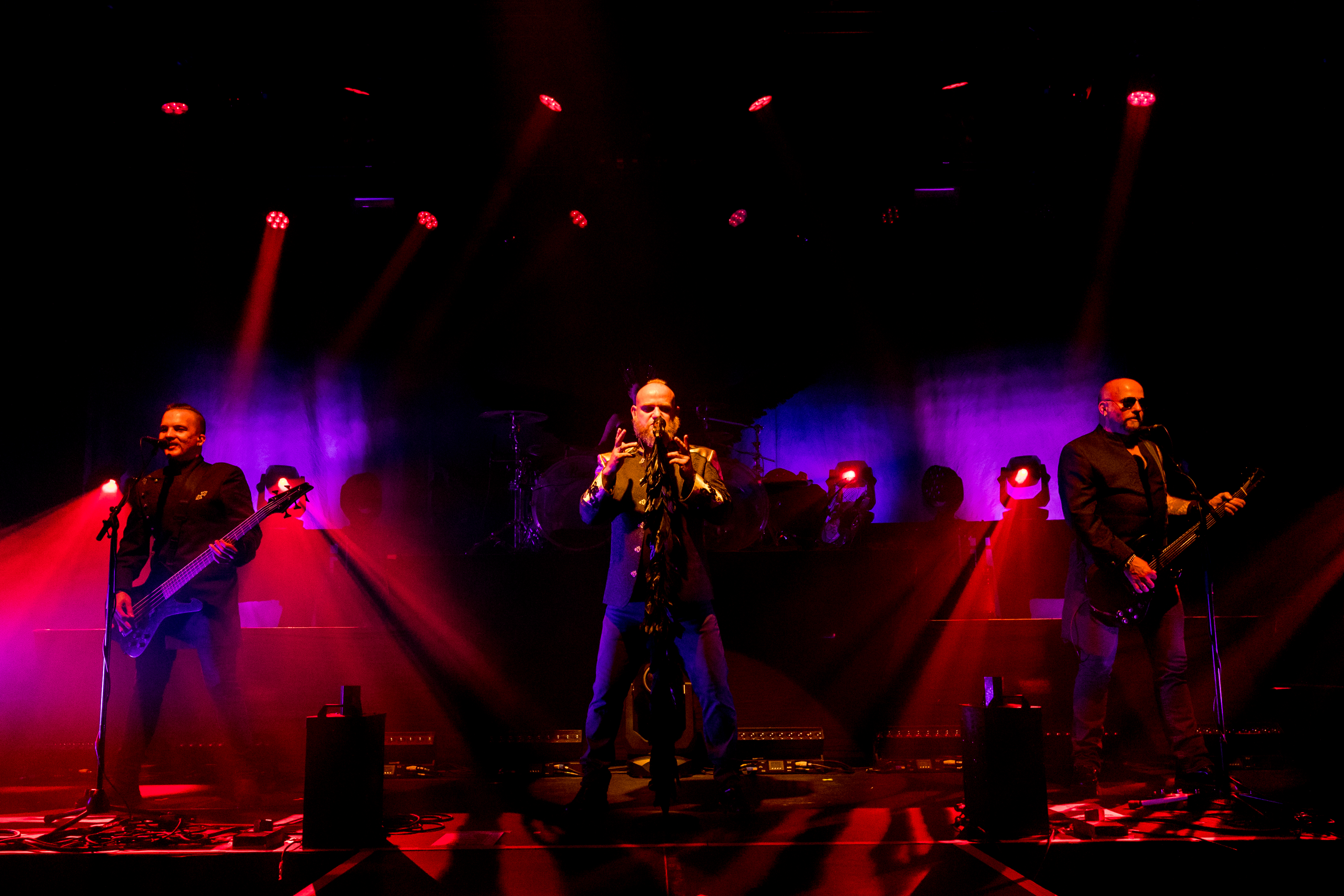
- Mono Inc. performing in 2023

Background information
- Origin: Hamburg, Germany
- Genres: Gothic rock; alternative rock; gothic metal; industrial rock
- Years active: 2000–present
- Labels: NoCut, SPV
- Members: Carl Fornia; Katha Mia; Martin Engler; John Lappin
- Past members: Miky Mono †; Manuel Antoni; Val Perun (Martin Purišić)
- Website: mono-inc.com

Mono Inc. is a German dark rock band from Hamburg, formed in 2000. They have had multiple albums reach the top 10 of the German charts.

== History ==
Mono Inc. was formed in 2000 by Miky Mono (vocals, bass), Carl Fornia (guitar) and Martin Engler (drums). Bass player Manuel Antoni joined in 2003, coinciding with the release of their self-published debut album Head Under Water. In 2004, the band signed with NoCut Entertainment and re-released the album with new artwork, spawning two singles: "Burn Me" and "Superman". During the production of their second album Temple of the Torn in 2006, Miky Mono was replaced with Engler on vocals and Katha Mia on drums. The album was released in 2007. The band's third album, Pain, Love & Poetry, was released in 2008. It contains three new versions of songs from Head Under Water and a duet with Lisa Middelhauve of Xandria in the single "Teach Me to Love". In 2009, Mono Inc. released their fourth album, Voices of Doom.

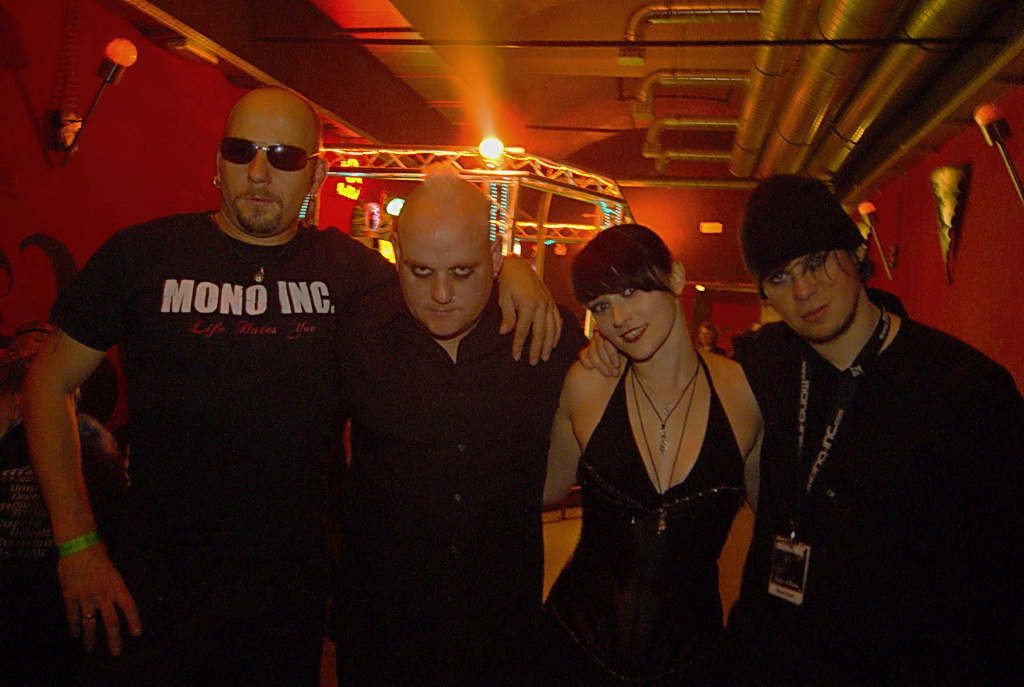
Mono Inc. in 2010

The band toured in 2009 with Subway to Sally and ASP, playing at more than forty concerts in Germany, Austria and Switzerland, and began headlining in 2010 during their "Voices of Doom Tour". Former singer Miky Mono died in October 2010 in a paragliding accident. In March 2011, Mono Inc. released their fifth album, Viva Hades. It was followed by another headlining tour, the "Viva Hades Tour", which included appearances in Austria and Switzerland for the second time, and guest appearances at the M'era Luna Festival and other festivals. After changing labels to SPV / Rookies & Kings in August 2012, the band released their sixth album, After the War, beginning the "After the War Tour". The song "From the Ashes" was performed live at the cruiserweight boxing match on 15 September 2012, between Yoan Pablo Hernández and Troy Ross in the Brose Arena in Bamberg.

Their seventh album, Nimmermehr, was released in August 2013, reaching third place in the German Offizielle Top 100 charts in its first week. In August 2014, the band released their first compilation album, the two-disc The Clock Ticks On 2004–2014. The first disc, titled "The Clock Ticks On", is a sixteen-track best-of compilation. The second disc, "Alive & Acoustic", is a sixteen-track acoustic re-release. "Gothic Queen" and "Twice in Life" served as the album's two singles, the second being the only new song composed for the album. The album was supported by the "Clock Ticks On Tour" in 2014 and the "Alive & Acoustic Tour" in 2015. In May 2015, the band released their eighth album, Terlingua, spawning five singles, followed by their "Terlingua Tour". In January 2017, they released their ninth album, Together Till the End, and later that year released their second compilation album, Symphonies of Pain. It is more comprehensive than The Clock Ticks On. In July 2018, they released their tenth album Welcome to Hell, followed by The Book of Fire in January 2020. The book of fire reached number one on the music charts. To celebrate the success, a different version of The Book of Fire was released in 2021 titled The Book of Fire (Platinum Edition). The album was followed by a massive international tour.

== Artistry ==
AllMusic described the band's style as an "amalgam of gothic metal and theatrical alternative rock".

"Mono" is a derivative of Monomania (German "Monomanie"), a term from the 19th-century psychiatric disease theory, a form of partial insanity conceived as single pathological preoccupation in an otherwise sound mind. "Monomania Incorporated" means "company of the partially insane" which was shortened to Mono Inc. for the band's name.

== Members ==
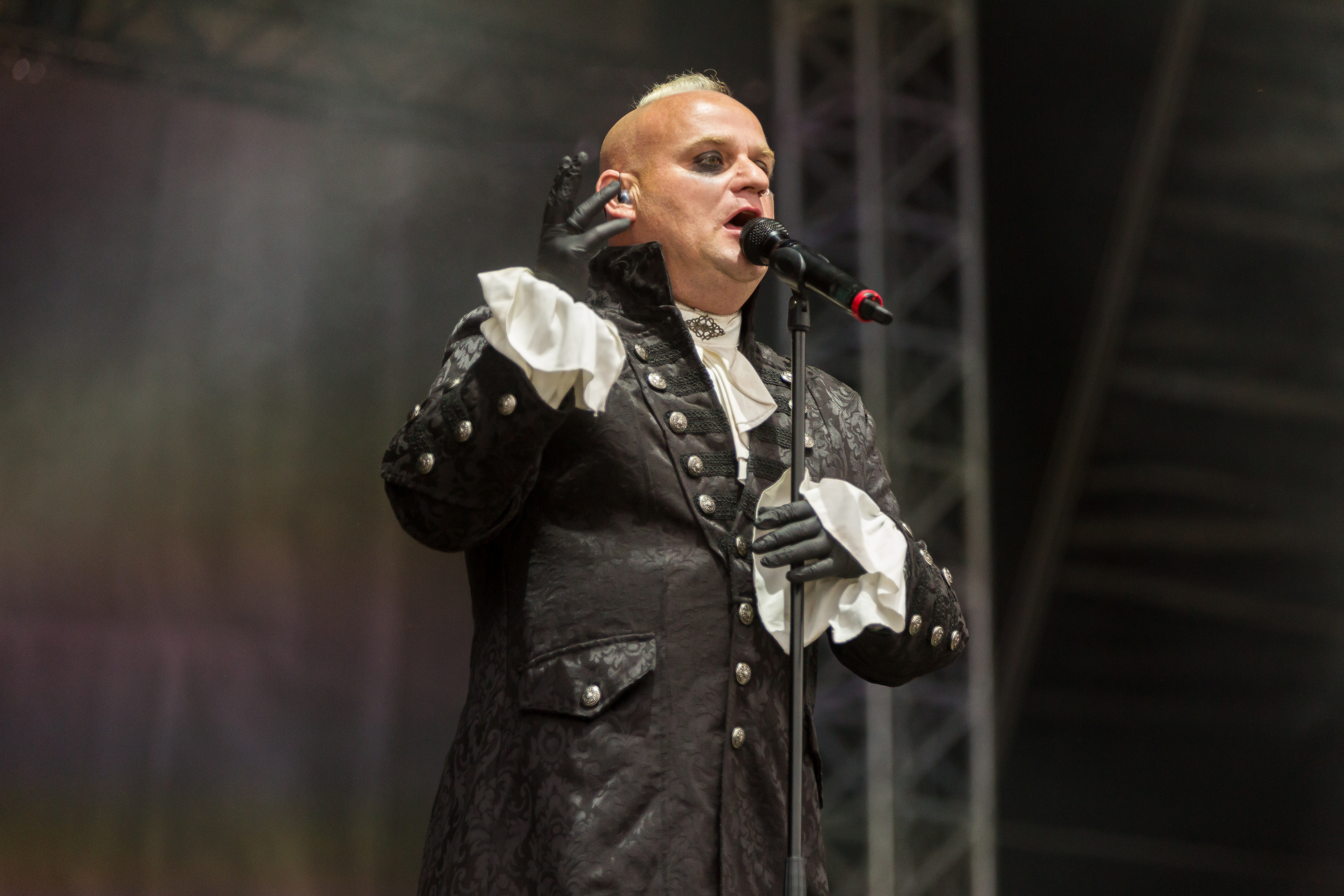
Singer Martin Engler

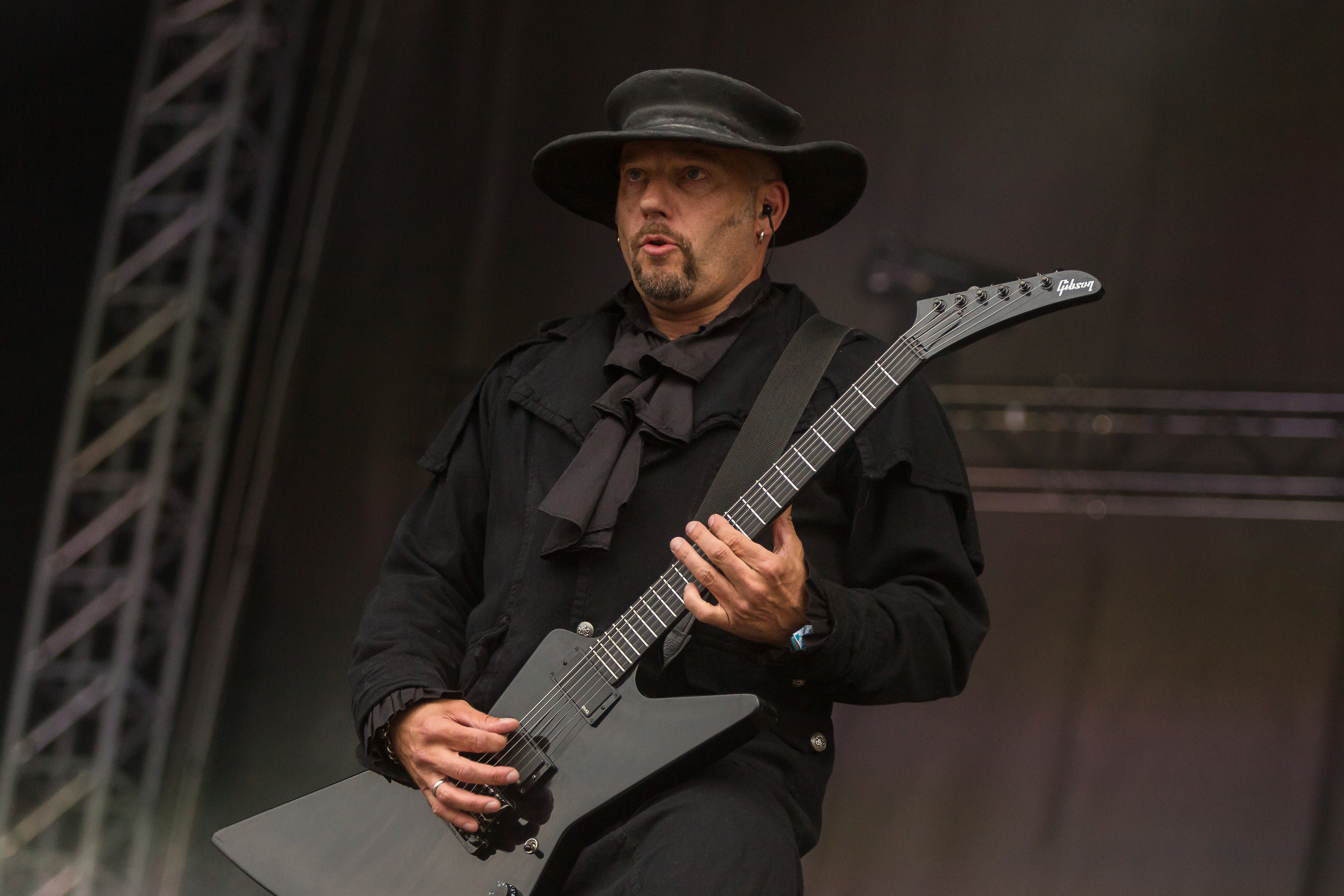
Guitarist Carl Fornia

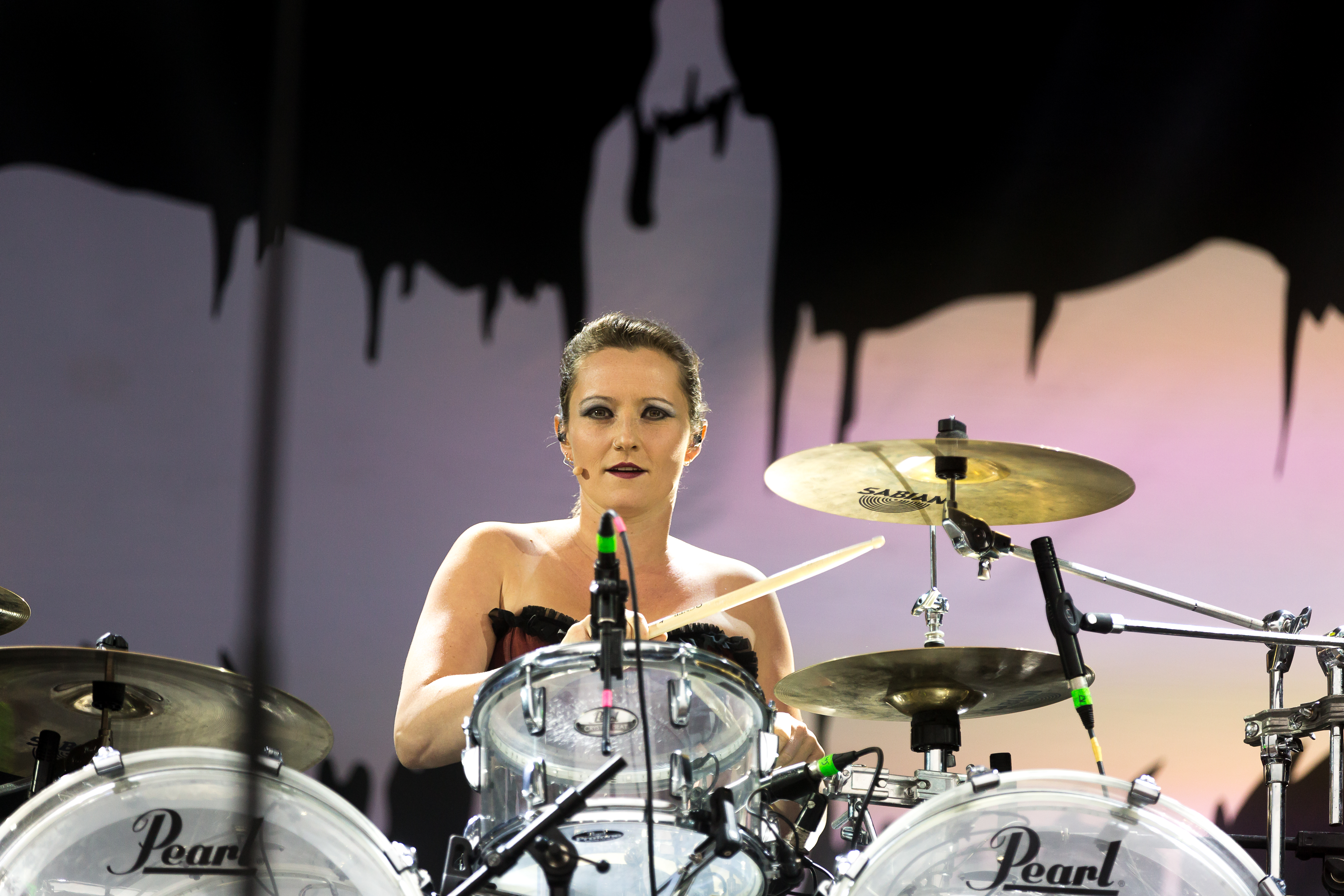
Drummer Katha Mia

=== Current ===
- Martin Engler – lead vocals (2007–present), drums (2000–2007)
- Carl Fornia – guitar, backing vocals (2000–present)
- Katha Mia – drums, backing vocals (2007–present)
- Ilja John Lappin – bass (2025–present)

=== Past ===
- Miky Mono – lead vocals (2000–2007), bass (2000–2003; died 2010)
- Manuel Antoni – bass, backing vocals (2003–2021)
- Val Perun – bass, backing vocals (2022–2024)

== Discography ==
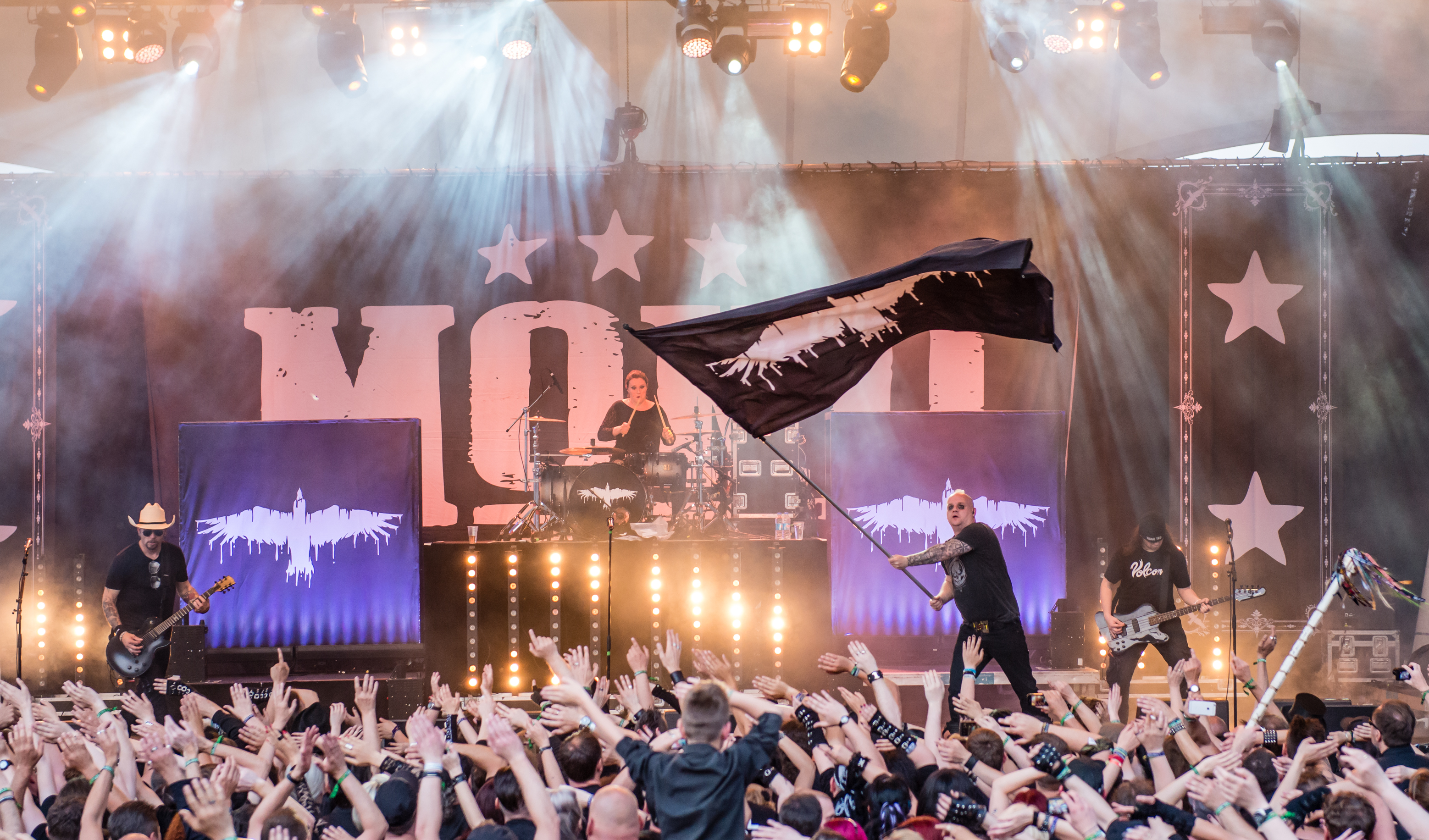
Mono Inc. at Blackfield Festival 2015

=== Studio albums ===
Year	Title	Peak (GER)
2003	Head Under Water	—
2007	Temple of the Torn	—
2008	Pain, Love & Poetry	—
2009	Voices of Doom	—
2011	Viva Hades	50
2012	After the War	6
2013	Nimmermehr	3
2015	Terlingua	6
2017	Together Till the End	6
2018	Welcome to Hell	2
2020	The Book of Fire	1
2023	Ravenblack	1
2025	Darkness	1

=== Compilation albums ===
Year	Title	Peak (GER)
2014	The Clock Ticks On 2004–2014	18
2017	Symphonies of Pain	—
2020	Melodies in Black	17

=== Live albums ===
Year	Title	Peak (GER)
2016	Live	25
2019	Symphonic Live	5
2023	Live in Hamburg	14
2024	Symphonic Live: The Second Chapter	5

=== EPs ===
- 2010: Comedown
- 2011: Revenge
- 2012: After the War
- 2013: Fan EP
- 2013: MMXII
- 2013: Twice in Life: An Acoustic EP
- 2015: Radio Mono Bonus EP
- 2015: Heiland
- 2015: An klaren Tagen

=== Singles ===
- "Burn Me"
- "Superman"
- "Temple of the Torn"
- "In My Heart"
- "Somberland"
- "This Is the Day"
- "Teach Me to Love"
- "Sleeping My Day Away"
- "Get Some Sleep"
- "Voices of Doom"
- "Comedown"
- "Symphony of Pain"
- "Revenge"
- "The Best of You"
- "After the War"
- "Wave No Flag"
- "Arabia"
- "Heile, heile Segen"
- "My Deal with God"
- "Kein Weg zu weit"
- "Gothic Queen"
- "Twice in Life"
- "Never-Ending Love Song"
- "Heiland"
- "Tag X"
- "An klaren Tagen"
- "Chasing Cars"
- "Children of the Dark"
- "The Bank of Eden"
- "Welcome to Hell"
- "A Vagabond's Life"
- "The Raven's Back"
- "Princess of the Night"
- "Empire"
- "Heartbeat of the Dead"

=== Music videos ===
- 2004: Superman
- 2007: Temple of the Torn
- 2007: In My Heart
- 2008: Teach Me to Love
- 2008: Sleep My Day Away
- 2008: Get Some Sleep
- 2008: This is the Day
- 2009: Voices of Doom
- 2011: Symphony of Pain
- 2011: Best of You
- 2012: Comedown
- 2012: After the War
- 2012: Arabia
- 2013: My Deal with God
- 2013: Kein Weg zu weit (feat. Joachim Witt)
- 2014: Twice in Life
- 2016: Children of the Dark
- 2017: Together Till the End
- 2018: Welcome to Hell
- 2018: A Vagabond's Life (feat. Eric Fish)
- 2018: Long Live Death
- 2019: The Book of Fire
- 2019: Louder than Hell
- 2019: Warriors
