= Burrn! Presents: The Best of Saxon =

Greatest hits album by Saxon
- Released: 25 April 2000
- Genre: Heavy metal
- Length: 76:08
- Label: EMI

Saxon chronology
Metalhead (1999)	Burrn! Presents: The Best of Saxon (2000)	Diamonds and Nuggets (2000)

Professional ratings
Review scores
Source	Rating
AllMusic	4/5 stars

Burrn! Presents: The Best of Saxon is a Japanese compilation album by heavy metal band Saxon released in 2000.

== Track listing ==
1. "Heavy Metal Thunder"
2. "Never Surrender"
3. "Wheels of Steel"
4. "Strong Arm of the Law"
5. "And the Bands Played On"
6. "Power & the Glory"
7. "Battle Cry"
8. "Motorcycle Man"
9. "I Can't Wait Anymore"
10. "S.O.S."
11. "Song for Emma"
12. "Rock the Nations"
13. "Broken Heroes"
14. "747 (Strangers in the Night)" (live)
15. "Princess of the Night" (live)
16. "Denim and Leather"
