= Eric Fish =

German musician

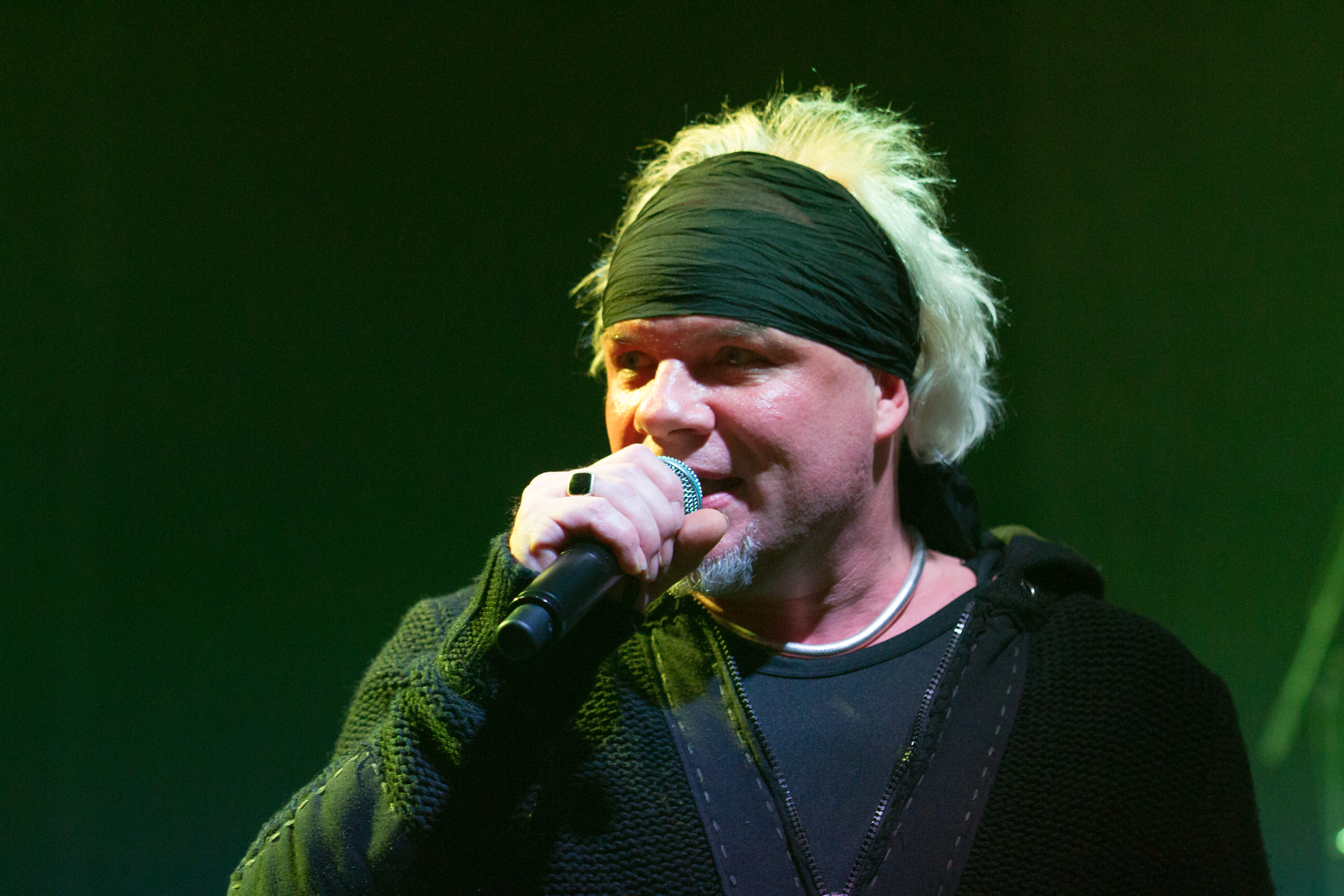
- Fish in 2014

Background information
- Born: Erik-Uwe Hecht; 28 May 1969 (age 57); Treuenbrietzen, East Germany (now Germany)
- Genres: Folk, rock, metal, Neue Deutsche Härte
- Occupations: Musician, singer, songwriter
- Instruments: Vocals, great highland bagpipe, shawm, oboe, tin whistle, acoustic guitar
- Member of: Subway to Sally
- Website: ericfish.de

Erik-Uwe Hecht (born 28 May 1969), known professionally as Eric Fish, is a German musician. He is the lead singer of German medieval metal band Subway to Sally and also performs as a solo artist.

== History ==
Fish's first musical merit was that of reaching the finale of an East German singer/songwriter competition in 1988. The same year he founded Catriona, a folk band based in Königs Wusterhausen, together with Jan Klemm ("Herr Jeh") and Marek Kalbus. The band released one album, the Rightfull King, in 1990, before it broke up. Jan Klemm went on to form the Inchtabokatables, and Fish joined Subway to Sally in 1992, where he initially played the bagpipes, pennywhistles and shared the position of singer with Simon and Bodenski. With the second release of the band, MCMXCV, Fish took over as main vocalist.

His solo project saw the light of day ("the darkness of pubs") in 1999, with Fish playing up to 6-hour-long gigs in small pubs. He was joined by Rainer Michalek in 2000, and Uwe Nordwig (Grenztanz) shortly thereafter. The program of the concerts consisted of rock cover songs, Irish folk and German singer/songwriter songs, as well as Subway to Sally songs.

His first solo album was released in 2004; a live album called Live: Auge in Auge (Live: eye to eye). Quite a few cover songs were on the record, but also original works, penned by Fish or Bodenski. The years of touring start to pay off, with the first sold-out concerts and coverage in the German music press. A new man joins in: Gerit Hecht, at first as backliner/sound engineer, but soon also onstage, as keyboarder. A second solo album, Zwilling (Twin) was released in 2005.

Fish also participated in "Weiß", a project by Rainer Michalek and Gerit Hecht, as a vocalist on several tracks. He has also guest-featured on a few releases in Germany and England (see discography).

== Discography ==
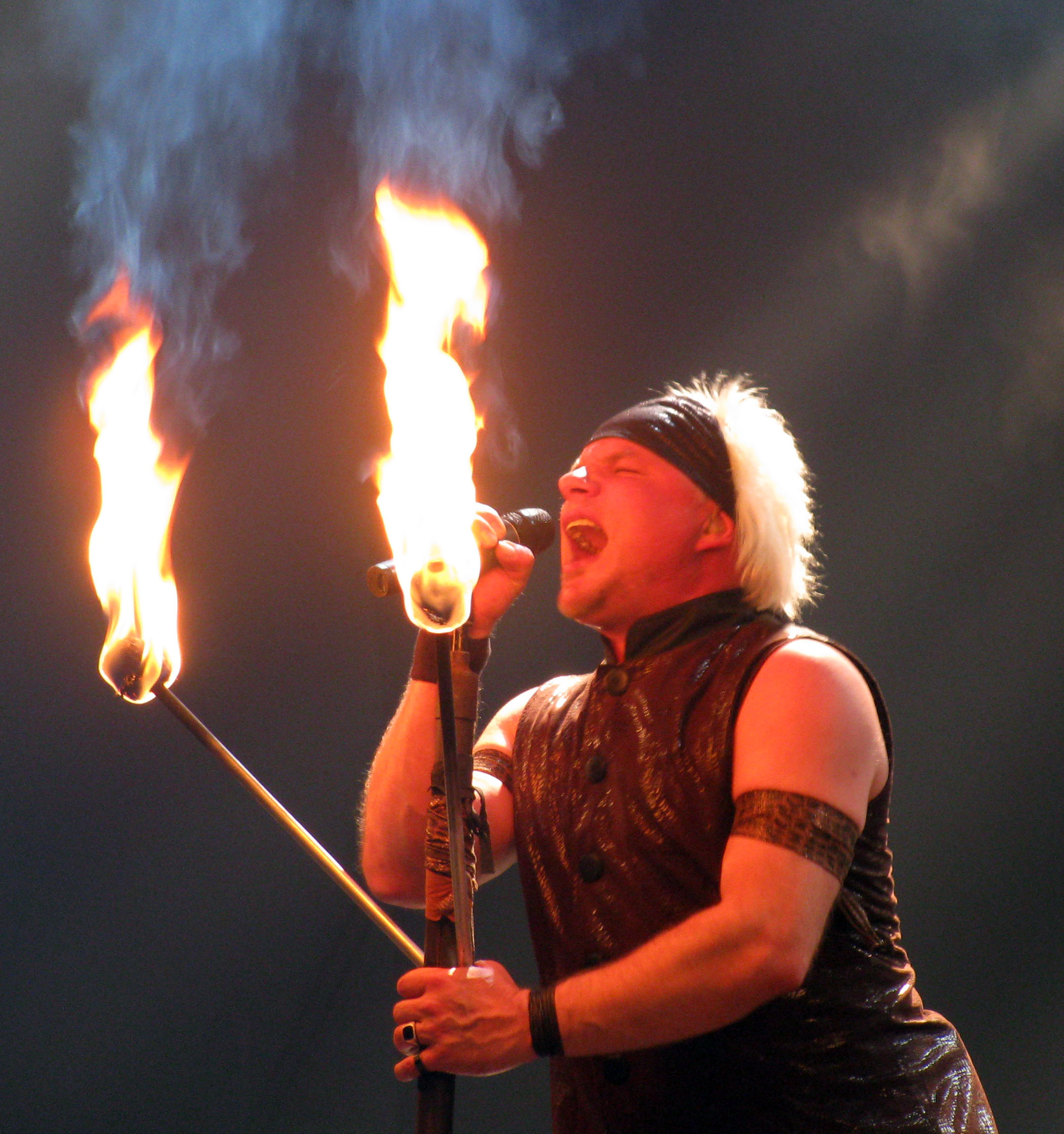
Fish performing in 2008

=== Solo ===
- Auge in Auge (2004, live)
- Zwilling (2006)
- Zugabe (2006)
- Gegen den Strom (2007)
- Zugabe II (2008)
- Anders Sein – Der FilmTourFilm (2009, live on CD and DVD)
- Alles im Fluss (2009)
- Zugabe III (2012)
- Kaskade (2013)
- Gezeiten (2018)

=== As Catriona ===
- The Rightfull King (1990)

=== With Subway to Sally ===
- Album 1994 (1994, label: Costbar)
- MCMXCV (1995) (1995, label: Stars in the dark)
- Foppt den Dämon! (1996, label: Red Rooster (record label Red Rooster)
- Bannkreis (1997, label: BMG/Ariola)
- Hochzeit (1999, label: BMG/Ariola)
- Schrei! (live album, 2000, label: BMG/Ariola)
- Herzblut (2001, label: Island Mercury)
- Die Rose im Wasser (Best Of album, 2001)
- Engelskrieger (2003, label: Motor Music)
- Subway to Sally Live (2 DVD, 2003, label: Motor Music)
- Nord Nord Ost (22 August, label: Nuclear Blast 2005)
- Nackt (2006, label: Nuclear Blast)
- Bastard (2007, label: Nuclear Blast)
- Kreuzfeuer (2009, label: Nuclear Blast)
- Nackt II (CD/DVD, 22 October, label: StS Entertainment 2010)
- Schwarz in Schwarz (2011, label: StS Entertainment)
- Mitgift (2014, label: StS Entertainment)
- Hey! (2019, label: StS Entertainment)
- Himmelfahrt (2023, label: Napalm Records)
- Post Mortem (2024, label: Napalm Records)

=== Guest appearances ===
- Skyclad – "Oui Avant-Garde a Chance" (1996)
- Grave Digger – "Excalibur" (1999)
- Pain of Progress – "Frozen Pain" (2001)
- Adorned Brood – "Erdenkraft" (2002)
- Nik Page – "Sacrifight" (2002)
- Fiddler's Green – "Folk Raider" (2002)
- Fiddler's Green – "Celebrate" (DVD, 2005)
- Letzte Instanz – "Ins Licht" (2006)
- ASP – "Zaubererbruder (Krabat Liederreihe 7)" (2006)
- "The Flames Still Burns" – song on "Ballroom Hamburg — A Decade of Rock" compilation (2010)
- Lord of the Lost - "Sin" - Nine Inch Nails cover (2016)
- Faun – "Duett" (2013)
- Mono Inc. – "A Vagabond's Life" (2018)
- Nachtblut - "Unterwegs" (2025)
