= Heavy Metal Thunder (Saxon album) =

- Cover art by Paul R. Gregory

Greatest hits album by Saxon
- Released: 23 September 2002
- Recorded: 2001, 2002
- Studios: Karo Studios, Brackel, Germany, live tracks recorded in San Antonio, Texas, U.S.
- Genre: Heavy metal
- Length: 86:16
- Labels: SPV/Steamhammer; UDR (2015 re-issue)
- Producers: Biff Byford, Saxon

Saxon chronology
Killing Ground (2001)	Heavy Metal Thunder (2002)	Lionheart (2004)

Professional ratings
Review scores
Source	Rating
AllMusic	2.5/5 stars

Heavy Metal Thunder is a greatest hits album by British heavy metal band Saxon, released in 2002. The album features eight re-recorded tracks, which first appeared on the limited edition of Killing Ground, as well as five other tracks. All of these tracks originally appeared on their first six albums, from their self-titled debut to Crusader.

A limited edition bonus disc, featuring five live tracks from a 2002 show in San Antonio, Texas, as well as the music video for Killing Ground recorded during Wacken Open Air 2001.

== Track listing ==
Disc 1
No.	Title	Length
1.	"Heavy Metal Thunder" (from Strong Arm of the Law)	4:13
2.	"Strong Arm of the Law" (from Strong Arm of the Law)	4:25
3.	"Power and the Glory" (from Power & the Glory)	5:59
4.	"And the Bands Played On" (from Denim and Leather)	2:53
5.	"Crusader" (from Crusader)	6:40
6.	"Dallas 1 PM" (from Strong Arm of the Law)	6:18
7.	"Princess of the Night" (from Denim and Leather)	4:11
8.	"Wheels of Steel" (from Wheels of Steel)	5:54
9.	"747 (Strangers in the Night)" (from Wheels of Steel)	5:02
10.	"Motorcycle Man" (from Wheels of Steel)	3:47
11.	"Never Surrender" (from Denim and Leather)	3:37
12.	"Denim and Leather" (from Denim and Leather)	5:21
13.	"Backs to the Wall" (from Saxon)	3:07

Disc 2
No.	Title	Length
1.	"Broken Heroes" (live)	4:10
2.	"Dragon's Lair" (live)	6:38
3.	"The Eagle Has Landed" (live)	5:52
4.	"20,000 Ft." (live)	3:45
5.	"Crusader" (live)	4:24
6.	"Killing Ground" (Music Video)

Disc 2 (2015 re-issue)
No.	Title	Length
1.	"Sacrifice"
2.	"Power & the Glory"
3.	"Heavy Metal Thunder"
4.	"Battalions of Steel"
5.	"Motorcycle Man"
6.	"And the Band Played On"
7.	"To Hell and Back Again"
8.	"747 (Strangers in the Night)"
9.	"Crusader"
10.	"Wheels of Steel"
11.	"Princess of the Night" (noted as Prince of the Night on the back side)
12.	"Denim and Leather"

The album was re-issued on 14 February 2015 by UDR. Disc one is identical to the original release. All tracks from Disc two were recorded live at the Bloodstock Heavy Metal Festival on 10 August 2014.

== Personnel ==
Saxon

- Biff Byford – lead vocals
- Paul Quinn – guitars
- Doug Scarratt – guitars
- Nibbs Carter – bass guitar
- Fritz Randow – drums

Production

- Biff Byford – producer
- Saxon – producer
- Karo Studios, Brackel, Germany – recording and mixing location
- Nikolo Kotzev – audio engineered
- Charlie Bauerfeind – audio engineered
- Rainer Hansel – executive producer, mixing
- Herman Frank – mixing
- Rainer Holst – mastering at Staccato Studios Hannover, Germany
- Paul R. Gregory – cover design
