= The Inchtabokatables =

German rock band

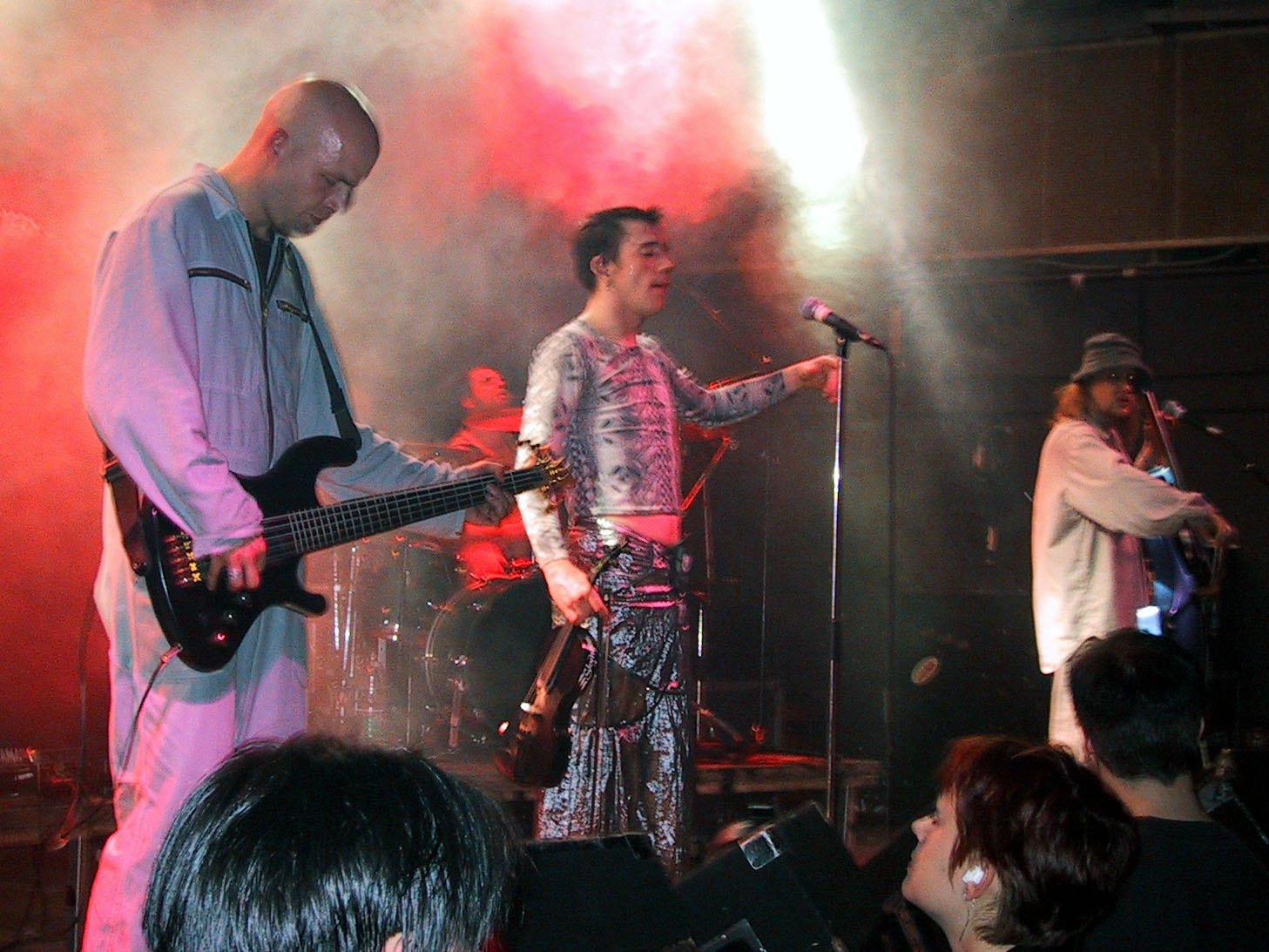
- The Inchtabokatables in 2001

Background information
- Origin: Berlin, Germany
- Genres: Folk rock, punk rock, industrial
- Years active: 1991–2002
- Members: "B. Breuler"/Robert Beckmann (vocals, violin) "B. Deutung"/Tobias Unterberg (cello) "Herr Jeh"/Jan Klemm (violin) "Kokolorus Mitnichten", "Dr. Tinitus Banani"/Titus Jany (drums) "Moeh" (bass)
- Past members: "Franzi Underdrive"/Franziska Schubert (bass, 1991–1992) "Orgien-Olli"/Oliver Riedel (bass, 1992–1994)
- Website: inchtabokatables.com

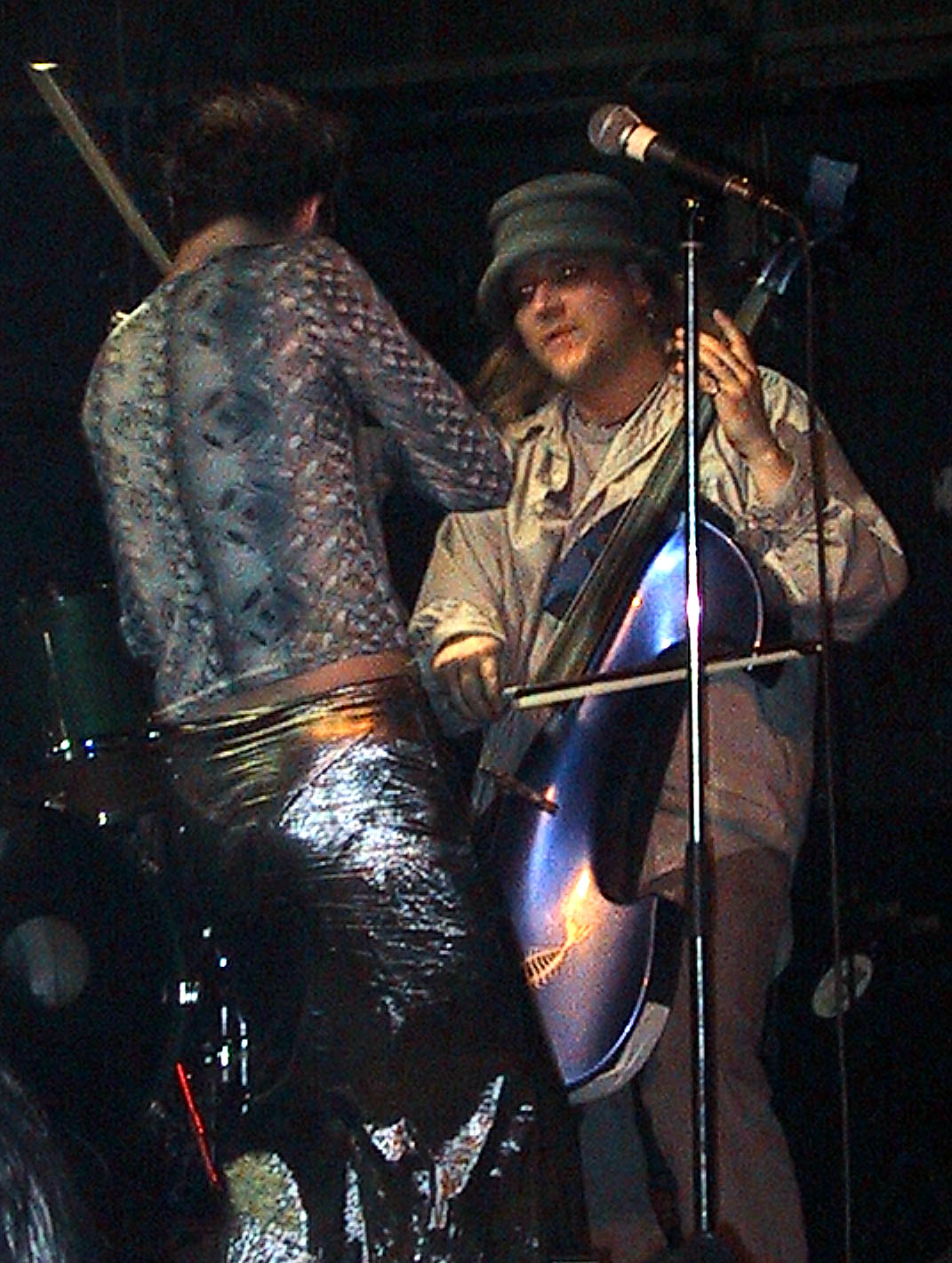
Performing on string instruments (at Zeche Carl, 2001)

The Inchtabokatables were a German band active from 1991 to 2002. The band only played on classical instruments (violins, cello, bass and drums). The band was known for their no guitar policy. Their style ranged from folk rock and Medieval rock to punk rock and on later albums even industrial.

== History ==
The Inchtabokatables were formed on 7 February 1991 in a pub in Berlin called "Bärenschenke". The founding members were B. Breuler, B. Deutung, Herr Jeh, Franzi Underdrive and Kokolorus Mitnichten. Before joining The Inchtabokatables, B. Deutung and Herr Jeh played together with Subway to Sally singer Eric Fish in the band Catriona. Franzi Underdrive left the band shortly after the release of their debut album 'Inchtomanie'. She was replaced by Oliver Riedel aka Orgien-Olli. After the release of White Sheep and Ultra Riedel went on to join the industrial band Rammstein. He was replaced by Moeh, who played in the industrial band T.A.S.S.. The band's style changed more and more from folk punk to industrial.

== Discography ==
=== Studio albums ===
- 1992 – Inchtomanie
- 1993 – White Sheep
- 1994 – Ultra
- 1997 – Quiet
- 1998 – Too Loud
- 2001 – Mitten im Krieg

=== Compilations and live albums ===
- 2000 – Nine Inch Years
- 2002 – Ultimate Live

=== Singles ===
- 1995 – Merry Christmas/X-mas in the Old Man's Hat
- 1998 – You Chained Me Up
- 2001 – Come with Me

== Hiatus ==
After 11 years of recording and touring, the band decided in 2002 to go on an hiatus. The band members are now in different projects:

- Titus Jany was the drummer for German folk band Potentia Animi, from its formation in 2002 until its disbandment in 2008.
- Tobias Unterberg tours with Deine Lakaien and Subway To Sally, he also played cello on the song Too Close to the Sun on New Model Army's album Carnival. Unterberg also toured with the popular German band Silbermond and worked on different songs on their first two albums.
- Robert Beckmann worked with the German folk metal band In Extremo.
- Robert Beckmann and Titus Jany are playing in the band Grüßaugust since 2010.
