= Killing Ground (album) =

- Cover art by Paul R. Gregory

Studio album by Saxon
- Released: 25 September 2001
- Recorded: 2001
- Studios: Karo Studios (Brackel, Germany)
- Genre: Heavy metal
- Length: 49:26
- Label: SPV/Steamhammer
- Producers: Biff Byford, Saxon

Saxon chronology
Diamonds and Nuggets (2000)	Killing Ground (2001)	Heavy Metal Thunder (2002)

Professional ratings
Review scores
Source	Rating
AllMusic	2.5/5 stars

Killing Ground is the fifteenth studio album by English heavy metal band Saxon, released in 2001. Killing Ground was also released as a special Digi-pack edition with a bonus disc featuring 8 classic re-recorded tracks which would later appear in Heavy Metal Thunder.

This is the last album to feature Fritz Randow on drums, and he left the band in 2004. The album received positive reviews, praising Saxon's heavy sound and catchy lyrics. Killing Ground demonstrated the band's ability to maintain their classic sound while updating their sound for modern musical demands, with some tracks that were well received by critics and fans alike, such as "The Court of the Crimson King" and "Coming Home".

== Track listing ==
All tracks are written by Saxon, except "The Court of the Crimson King" by Ian McDonald and Peter Sinfield.

No.	Title	Length
1.	"Intro"	1:36
2.	"Killing Ground"	5:44
3.	"The Court of the Crimson King" (King Crimson cover)	6:00
4.	"Coming Home"	3:38
5.	"Hell Freezes Over"	4:42
6.	"Dragons Lair"	3:38
7.	"You Don't Know What You've Got"	5:00
8.	"Deeds of Glory"	4:34
9.	"Running for the Border"	4:24
10.	"Shadows on the Wall"	6:15
11.	"Rock Is Our Life"	3:55

== Personnel ==
Saxon

- Biff Byford – lead vocals
- Paul Quinn – guitars
- Doug Scarratt – guitars
- Nibbs Carter – bass guitar
- Fritz Randow – drums

Production

- Biff Byford – producer
- Saxon – producer
- Rainer Hänsel – executive producer
- KARO Studios, Brackel, Hamburg, Germany – recording location
- Nikolo Kotzev – audio engineer
- Charlie Bauerfeind – audio engineer
- Herman Frank – mixing
- Rainer Hänsel – mixing
- Paul R. Gregory Studio 54 – artwork

== Charts ==
Chart (2001)	Peak position
French Albums (SNEP)	141
German Albums (Offizielle Top 100)	26
