= Diamonds and Nuggets =

Compilation album by Saxon
- Released: 11 September 2000
- Recorded: 1972–1983
- Genre: Heavy metal
- Length: 78:12
- Label: Angel Air

Saxon chronology
Burrn! Presents: The Best of Saxon (2000)	Diamonds and Nuggets (2000)	Killing Ground (2001)

Professional ratings
Review scores
Source	Rating
AllMusic	3/5 stars

Diamonds and Nuggets is a compilation album by heavy metal band Saxon released in 2000.

This compilation consists of rare and unreleased tracks recorded during the early days of Saxon. Although there are extensive liner notes from Graham Oliver and Steve Dawson for each track in the booklet of the CD, sometimes it isn't easy to classify the tracks chronologically. "Walking" is - considering the chronology - the first recorded track on this compilation. It was recorded by Graham Oliver and Steve Dawson in 1972, so it might be a recording of the band Blue Condition. The tracks, which are following chronologically, are those from the Tapestry Sessions in early 1976, shortly after the band changed its name from S.O.B. to Son Of A Bitch. These songs are "Still Fit to Rock 'n' Roll", the early title of "Still Fit to Boogie", "Ain't You Glad to Be Alive" and the first version of "Freeway Mad" (printed as "Freeway Mad (Part 1)" in the booklet and misprinted as "Freeway Mad (Part 2)" on the inlay). Then there are the tracks from the Luxemburg sessions in 1978, still recorded under the moniker of Son Of A Bitch. These tracks are "See the Light Shining", "Stand up and Be Counted", the second version of "Freeway Mad" (printed as "Freeway Mad (Part 2)" in the booklet and on the inlay), "Ann Marie", "Lift up Your Eyes" and "Street Fighting Gang" (misprinted as "Street Fighting Man" in the booklet and on the inlay). Some tracks on the CD are from the period when the band had already changed its name to Saxon. Those are the three live tracks "Stallions of the Highway", "Midnight Rider" and "Frozen Rainbow" with Nigel Glockler on drums, the "Stone Room Jam", which was recorded during the mixing of the live album The Eagle Has Landed in 1982 and the Power and the Glory-outtakes "Turn out the Lights", "Coming to the Rescue" and "Make 'em Rock". The studio version of "Frozen Rainbow" with Rod Argent on keyboards and the original version of "Big teaser" cannot be classified chronologically, but they seem to be recorded, when Saxon still was called Son Of A Bitch. The live version of "Frozen Rainbow" is the same, which is released as bonus track on the remastered edition of The Eagle Has Landed, but with a better mix.

== Track listing ==
1. "Stallions of the Highway" (live at The Rainbow) – 3:20
2. "Midnight Rider" (live) – 5:21
3. "Frozen Rainbow" (live) – 6:00
4. "Turn out the Lights" – 4:05
5. "Coming to the Rescue" – 3:38
6. "See the Light Shining" – 4:54
7. "Stand up and Be Counted" – 5:33
8. "Freeway Mad (Part 2)" – 1:53
9. "Ann Marie" – 5:39
10. "Lift up Your Eyes" – 1:48
11. "Street Fighting Man" – 3:25
12. "Still Fit to Rock 'n' Roll" – 3:06
13. "Big Teaser" (Original) – 3:35
14. "Frozen Rainbow" – 7:07
15. "Walking" (bonus track) – 4:43
16. "Make 'em Rock" (bonus track) – 3:18
17. "Stone Room Jam" (bonus track) – 5:27
18. "Ain't You Glad to Be Alive" (bonus track) – 2:51
19. "Freeway Mad (Part 1)" (bonus track) – 2:09
