= Subway to Sally =

German medieval metal band

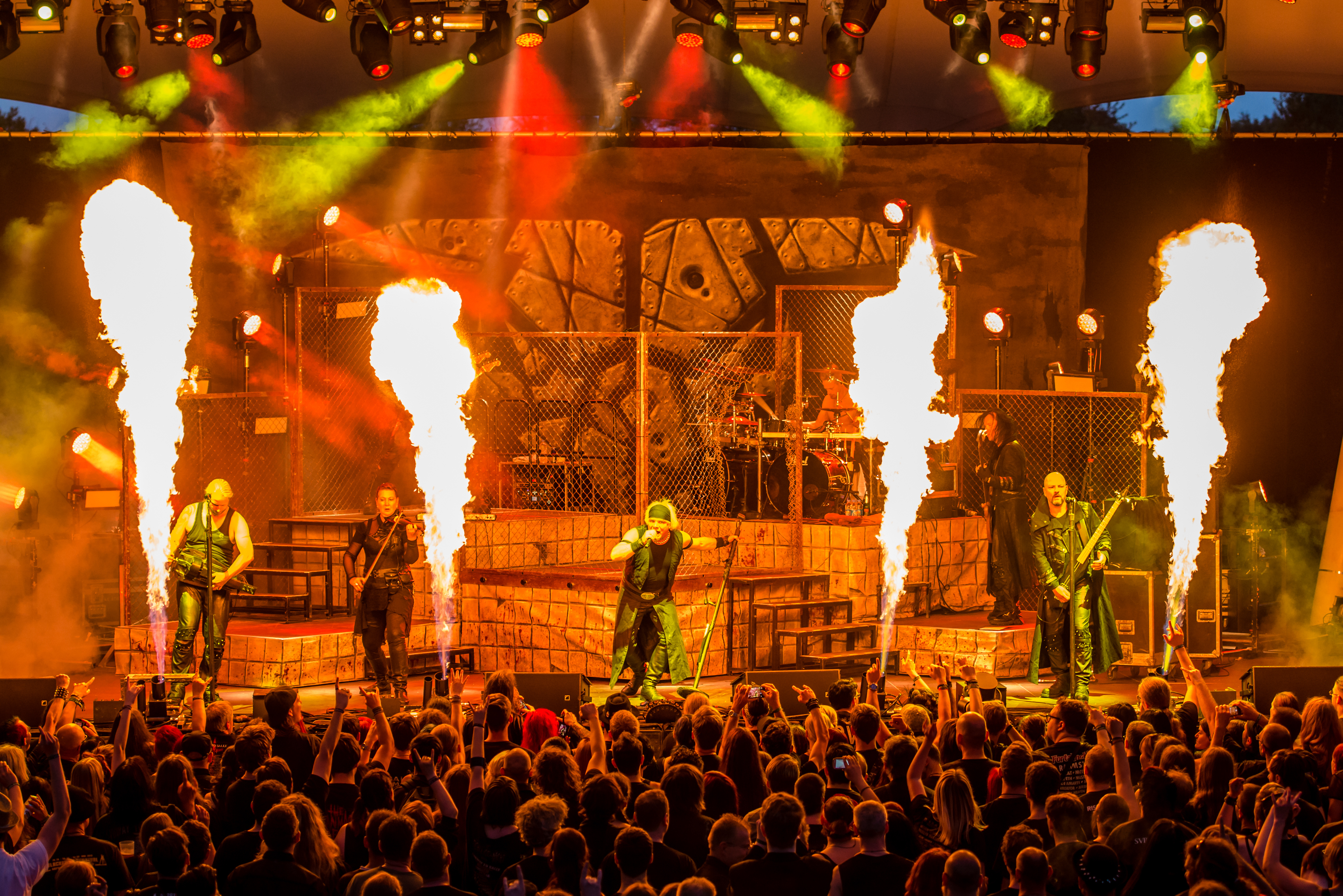
- Subway to Sally in 2015

Background information
- Origin: Potsdam, Germany
- Genres: Medieval metal; medieval rock; folk metal; folk rock; Neue Deutsche Härte
- Years active: 1990–present
- Label: Various
- Members: Michael "Bodenski" Boden (acoustic guitar, guitar, vocals); Eric Fish (wind instruments, lead vocals); Ingo Hampf (guitar, lute, mandoline); Almut "Ally" Storch (violin); Silvio "Sugar Ray" Runge (bass); Simon Michael Schmitt (drums)
- Past members: David Pätsch; Jörg B.; T.W.; Frau Schmitt (until 2016); Michael "Simon" Levko (until 2026)
- Website: subwaytosally.com

Subway to Sally is a German medieval metal band founded in Potsdam in the early 1990s. Their music has clear folk and medieval influences, later also adding gothic and metal elements. With their continuous inclusion of oriental sounds and elements of classical music and the use of instruments seldom seen in metal bands such as bagpipes, shawm, violin, hurdy-gurdy and lute, Subway to Sally has acquired the label of medieval metal. The band has released 12 studio albums, two live albums, and two live DVDs. Their fame is centered mainly in the German-speaking countries, having played only a handful of concerts outside of that area.

== History ==
The group's logo

Subway to Sally gave its first concert in September 1990. The band then consisted of Ingo Hampf, Bodenski, Simon, Coni (trumpet) and Guido (drums). Their first appearance onstage was in the Potsdamer "Stube" in January 1992, in the constellation with which they later recorded their first album (Album 1994). With the group deciding on needing a fiddle to complete the sound, they brought Frau Schmitt (Silke Volland) to the band, who in turn introduced them to Eric Fish (Erik Hecht) on bagpipes.

In their early years, Subway to Sally played Irish/Scottish-inspired folk rock, as reflected by the track list of their first album, which was their only album where the majority of songs are in English. For these English lyrics they hired a friend. After this, the group decided that they wanted to keep their lyrics in German, thus becoming a part of the first wave of bands to do so after the Berlin Wall broke down. Their second album, released in 1995 and aptly named MCMXCV, saw a mixture of biblically inspired lyrics and what is often referred to as medieval music. Three major changes can be noted with the release of MCMXCV: the appearance of German lyrics penned by Bodenski, Eric Fish moving up from the piper to being the frontman and main singer, and two translated folk songs, Krähenfraß ("The two Corbies") and Carrickfergus, adapted to fit the band's style.

Between 1994 and 1997, the band rapidly released four albums and toured Germany to exhaustion, with an average of around 100 concerts per year. Drummer T.W. left the band in 1997 after completing the recordings of Foppt den Dämon! and was replaced by David Pätsch for the tour and subsequent albums. Bannkreis was the first chart entry of the band. With Hochzeit, the band broke their habits and spent more time on album production, leading to a more polished sound. This paid off with another chart placement, as the album made it to number 19 in the official charts. The sound of Hochzeit is very much continued with the next studio album, Herzblut, though thematically moving in a different direction. Where Hochzeit is darker and ends on the note of "Müde" ("Tired"), Herzblut starts off with the energetic "die Schlacht" ("the battle"), declaring "Ich gewinne diese Schlacht" ("I am winning this battle").

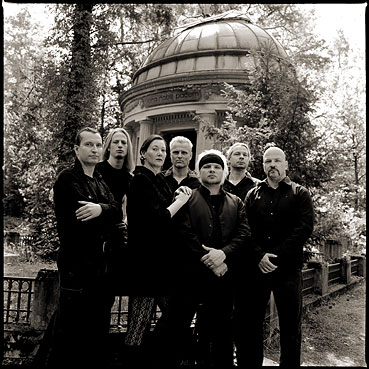
Subway to Sally in 2007

In 2003, the album Engelskrieger was released. In preparation of the release, the band made the lyrics available on their homepage, leading to wild discussions and accusations of "selling out". The sound of the record, breaking clearly with their previous works, did nothing to silence those accusations. Subway to Sally had grown up, met up with the real world and made a deeply disturbing record, dealing with modern issues on modern terms. The song Wenn Engel hassen ("When angels hate") from Herzblut can be said to explore the same terrain that Geist des Kriegers ("Spirit/Ghost of the warrior") does, dealing with an individual running amok. Several band members have emphasized the impact of the September 11 attacks and the following political events as inspirational source for the album. Other songs deal with incest, euthanasia, leaders who mislead their people, and the general fall and corruption of Western society. Engelskrieger entered the German charts at number 9, and the band once more toured extensively. A live DVD was filmed in the Columbiahalle in Berlin on the first leg of the tour, leading to the release of a double DVD in the fall of 2003. In April 2004, Subway to Sally changed labels, leaving Universal (Motor) for the smaller metal label Nuclear Blast.

The band's concert in Lindenpark on 30 December 2004 was drummer David Pätsch's last show. Pätsch left the band to pursue another musical direction with the Blue Man Group in Berlin. Subway to Sally spent half a year looking for a replacement before finally deciding on Simon Michael Schmitt to replace Pätsch. The recording of the new album was already finished by the time "Tiny Simon" joined the band.

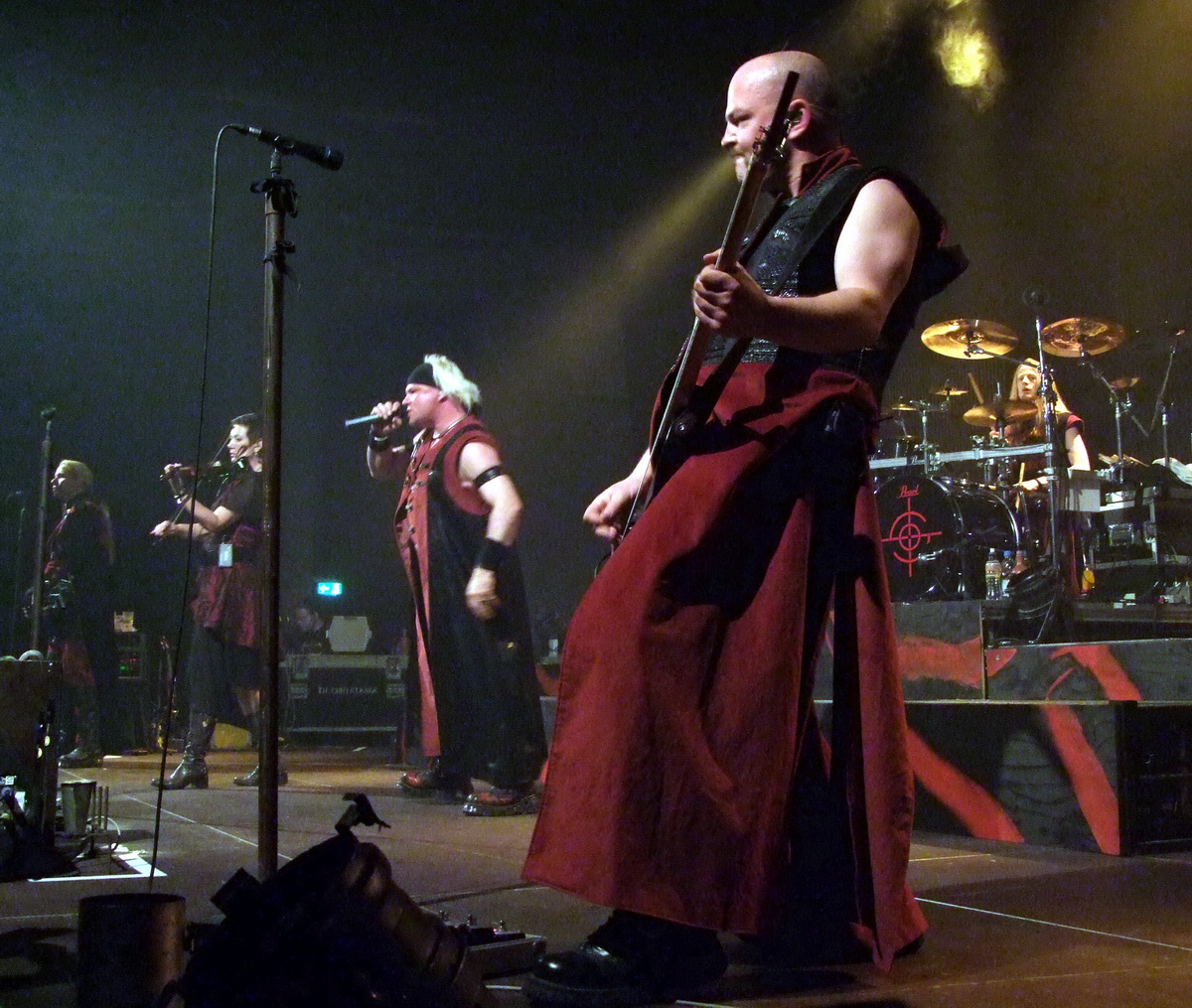
Subway to Sally in 2009

Despite being pleased with the outcome of Engelskrieger, the band made no secret of it being a one-off and a return to the more conventional "Sally-Sound" with the next studio recording. Nord Nord Ost was originally planned to be released in 2004 but was delayed until late 2005 due to the extent of the production. Though the band have previously made use of musicians from outside the band, they now did so on a bigger scale, involving the Deutsches Filmorchester Babelsberg to create a wider and more orchestral sound. The album debuted at number 5 in the official charts, the highest chart placement the band has seen to date.

In 2006, the group released the CD/DVD Nackt, a live recording of acoustic versions of some of their songs.

On 19 October 2007, their album Bastard was released via Nuclear Blast Records. Bastard was recorded at Horus studio in Hanover, Germany, and Lundgaard studio in Denmark.

== Side projects ==
Several of the band members have side or solo projects. Wanting to "return to his roots" as a musician, Eric Fish started touring on his own in 1999. This project became a band in its own right. Three CDs have been released: Auge in Auge, Zwilling and Gegen den Strom. Fish is also involved in an online-only project called "Weiß" and often appears as a guest musician for other bands such as Letzte Instanz and Fiddler's Green. Bodenski has published a book of poems, called Inniglich, which draws heavily from his lyrics for Subway to Sally and also contains other works and unpublished Sally songs. Along with his brother Chris and his sister Dodo Little, Simon also plays in the power metal band Silverlane, which signed with Drakkar Entertainment in 2008. Frau Schmitt used to be a member of the somewhat "folky-jazzy" ensemble 17 Hippies.

== Band members ==
Subway to Sally, band members at Metal Frenzy 2024 and Rockharz 2026

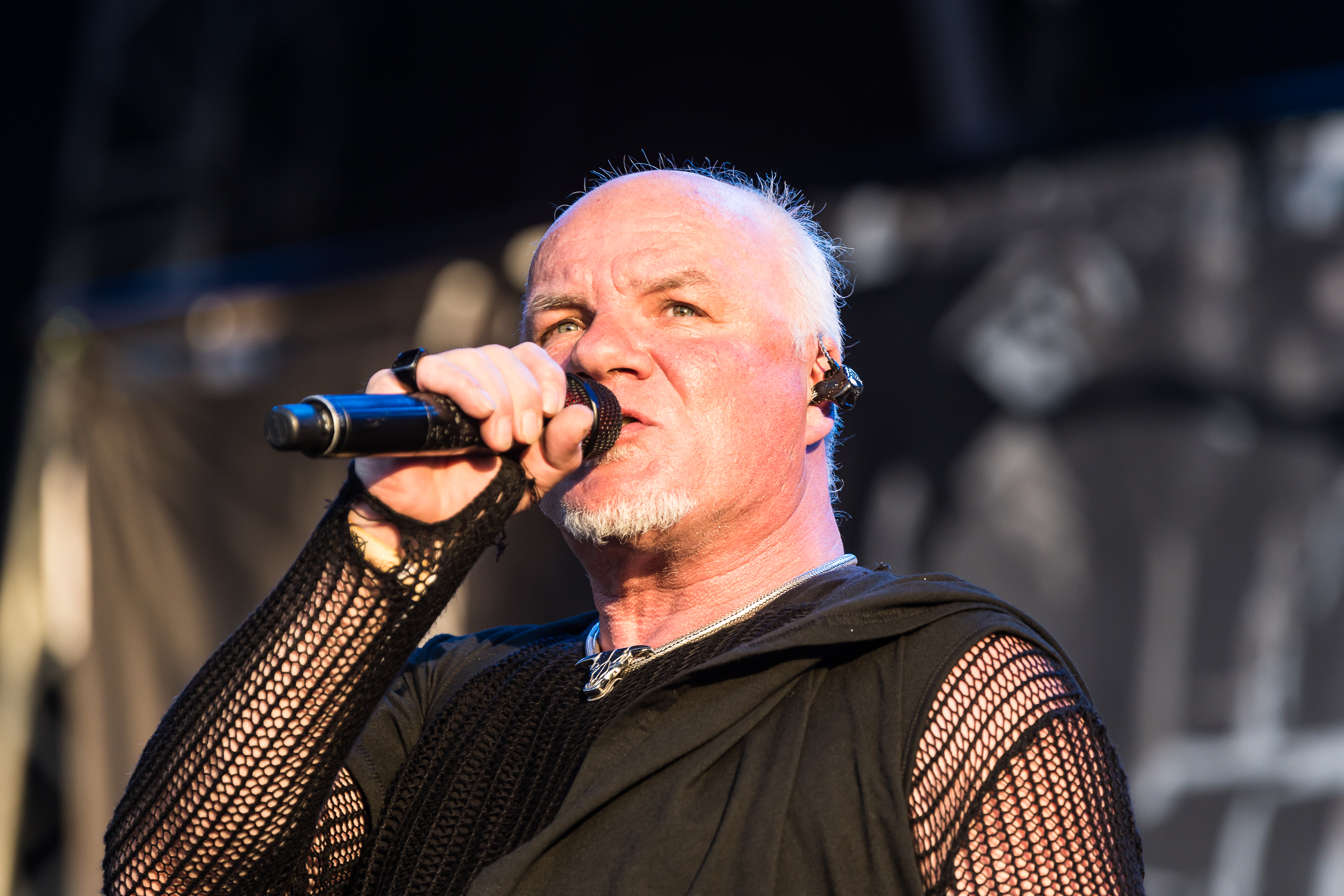
„Eric Fish“ (Erik-Uwe Hecht), vocals, various instruments (2026)

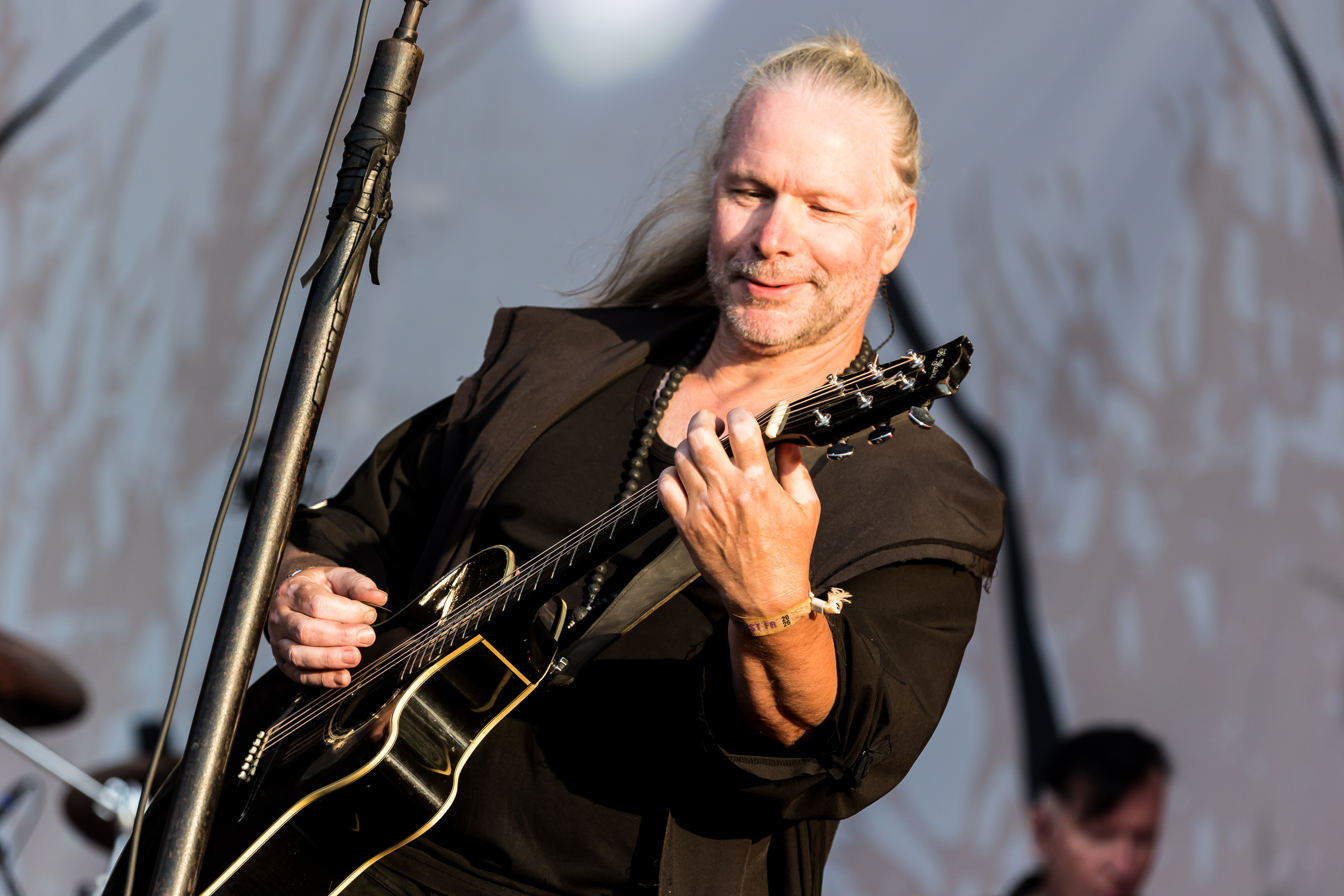
„Bodenski“ (Michael Boden), accoustik guitar, hurdy-gurdy (2026)

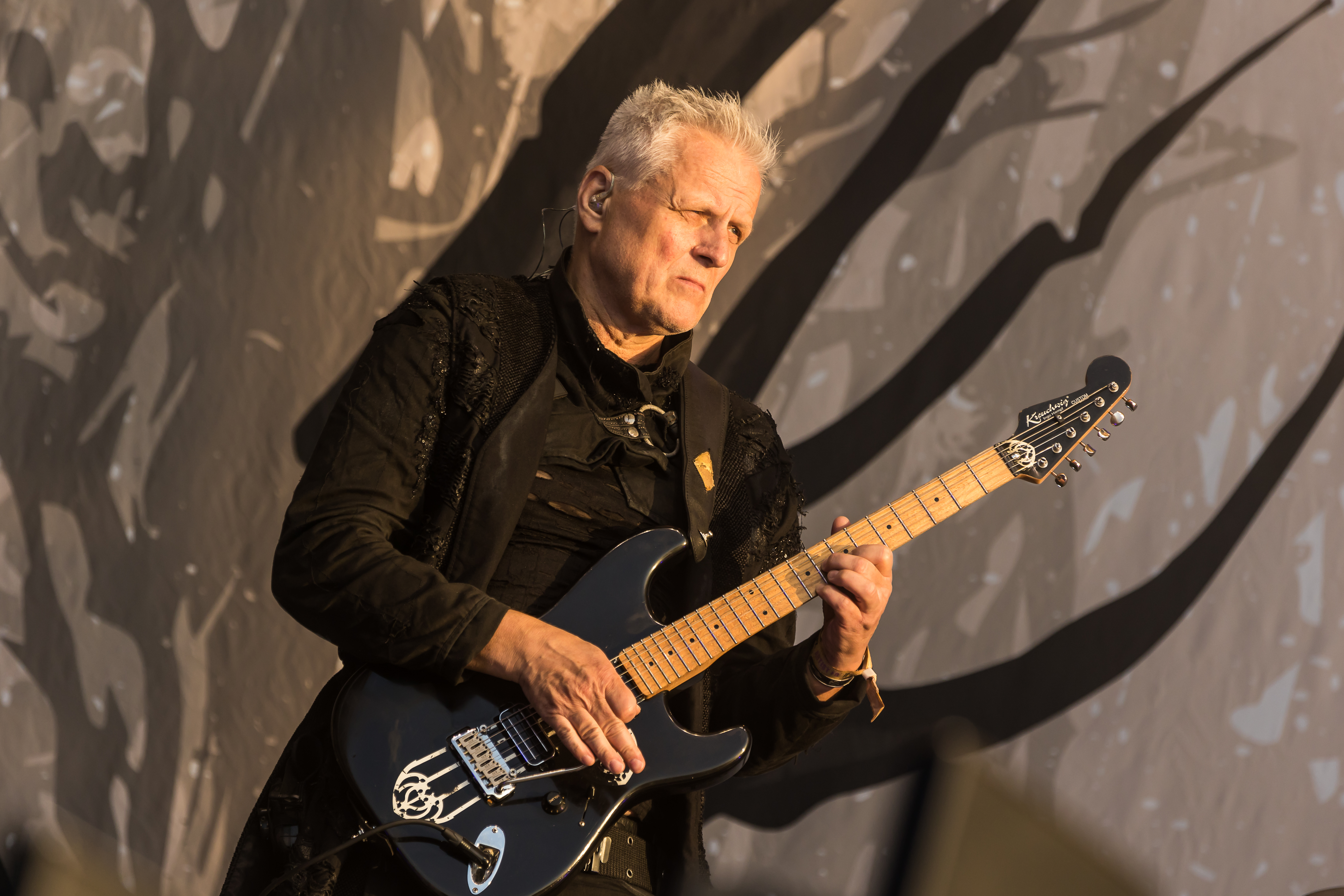
Ingo Hampf, electric guitar (2026)

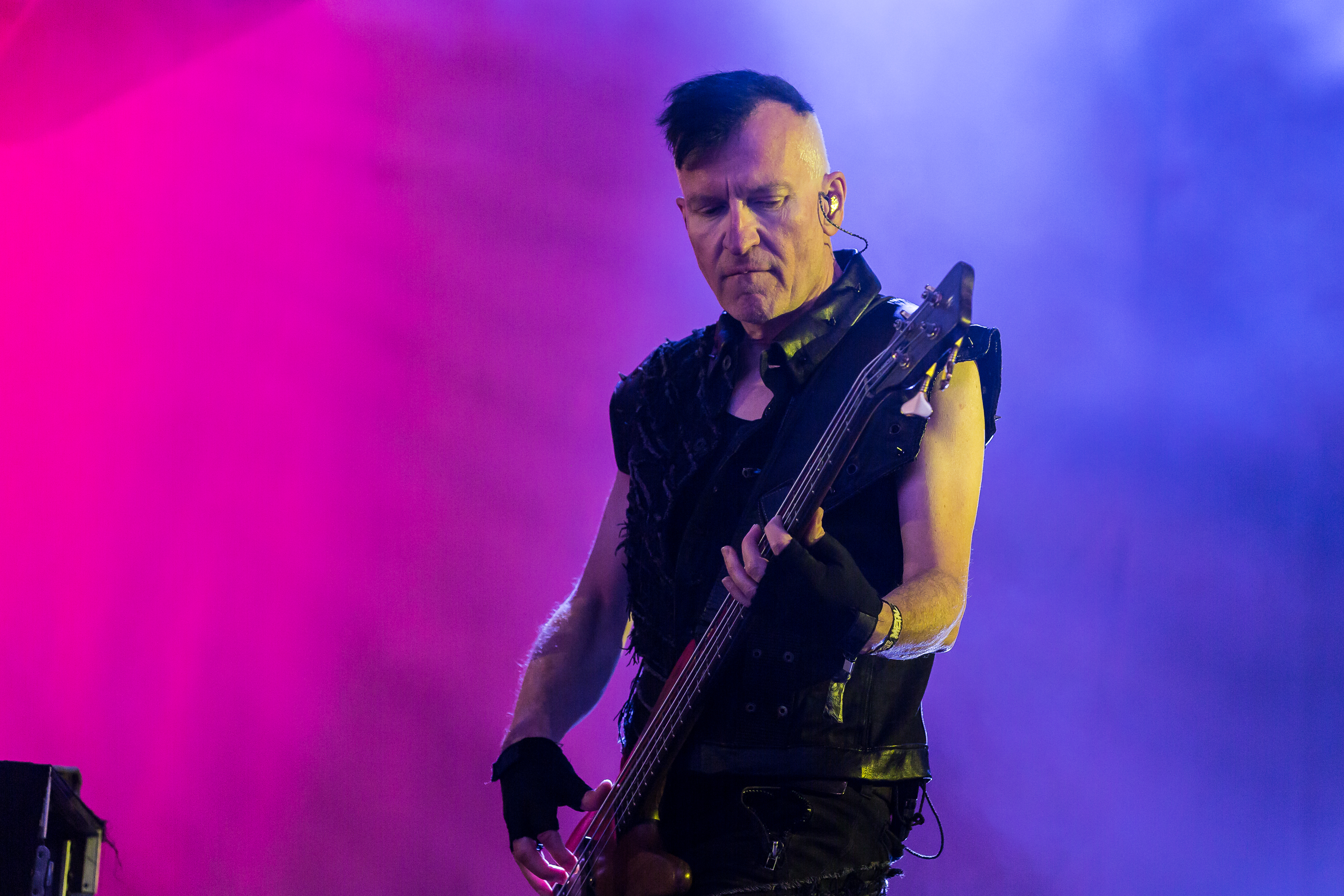
„Sugar Ray“ (Silvio Runge), bass (2024)

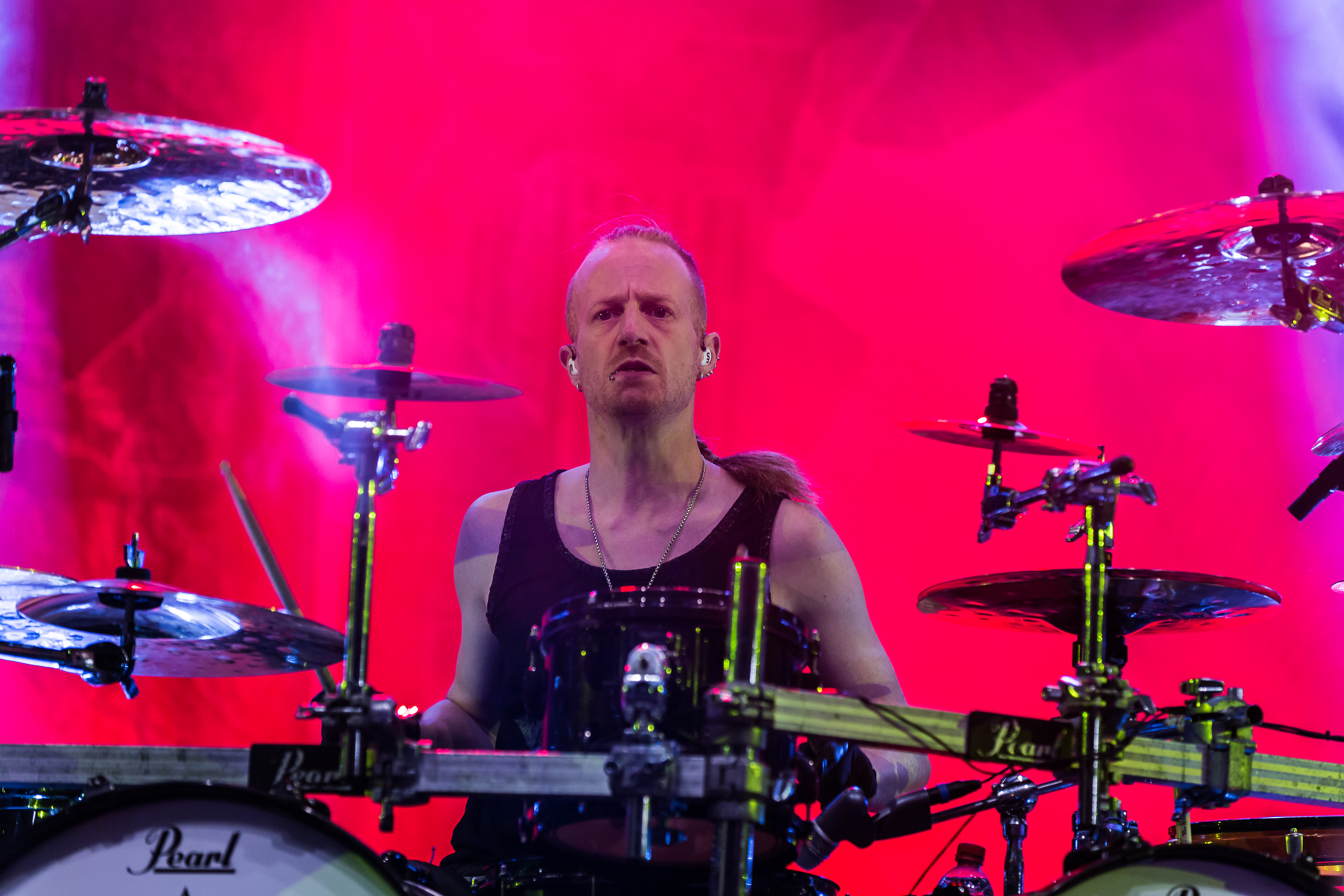
„Simon Michael“ (Simon Michael Schmitt), drums (2024)

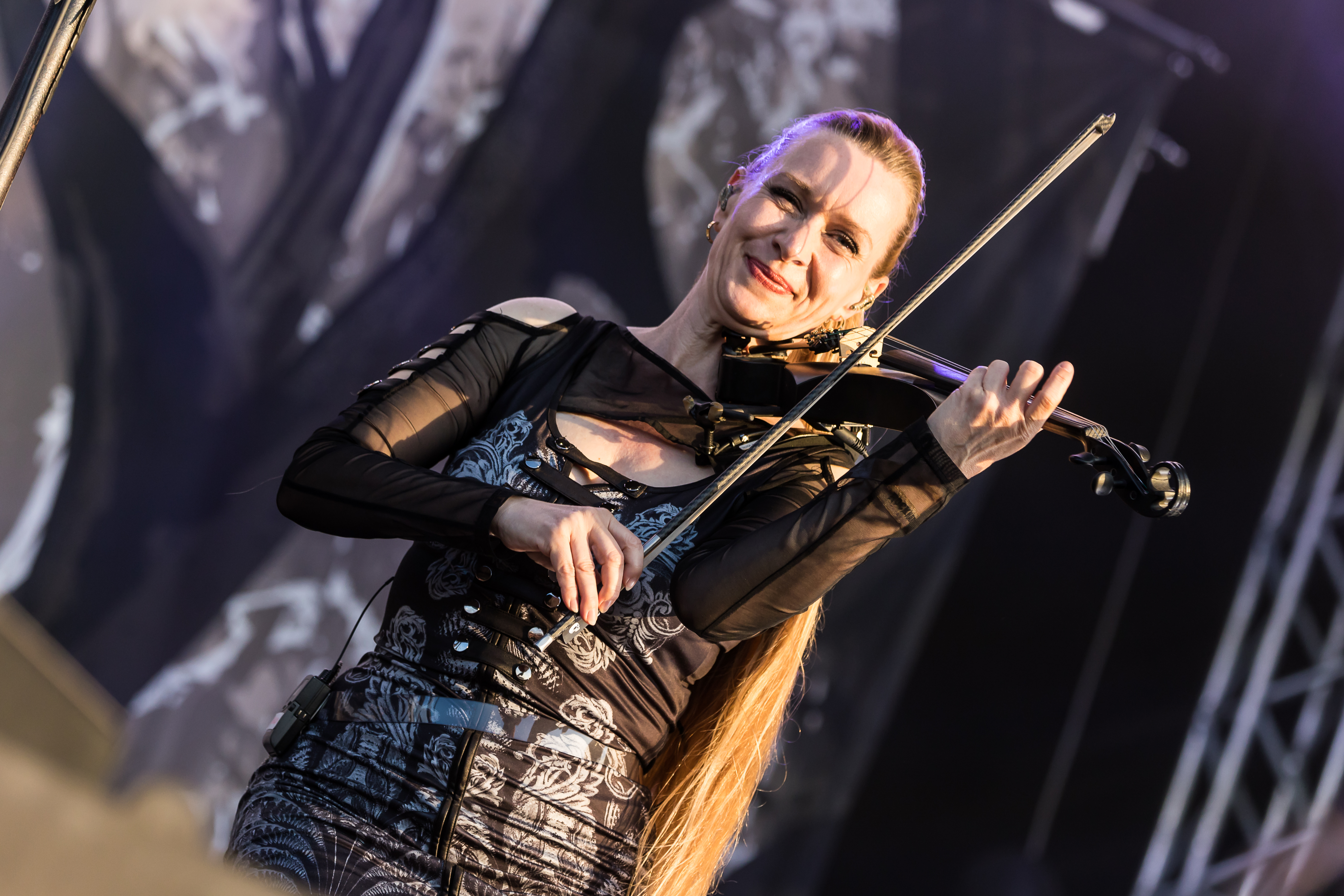
Ally Storch (Almut Storch), violin (2026)

== Discography ==
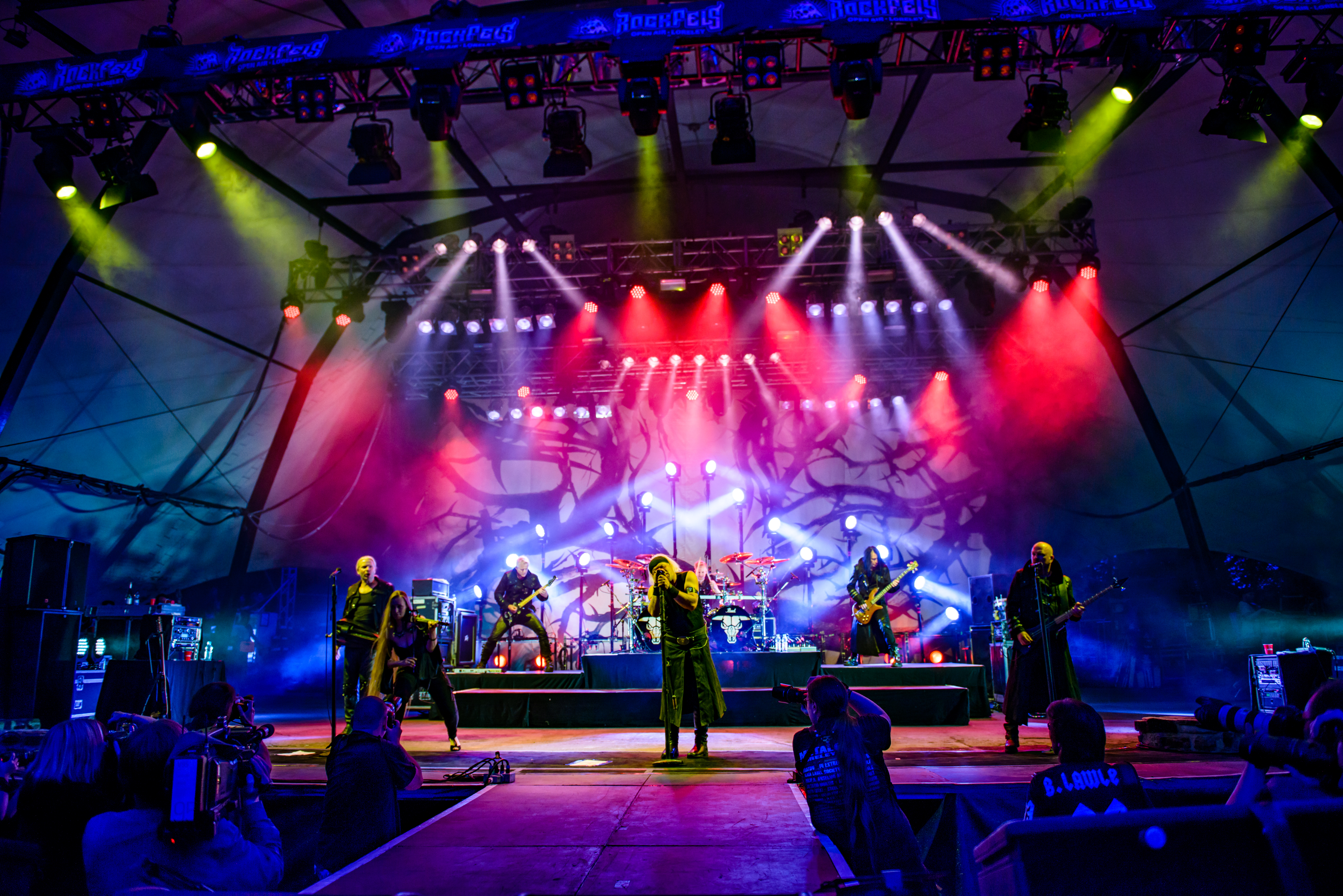
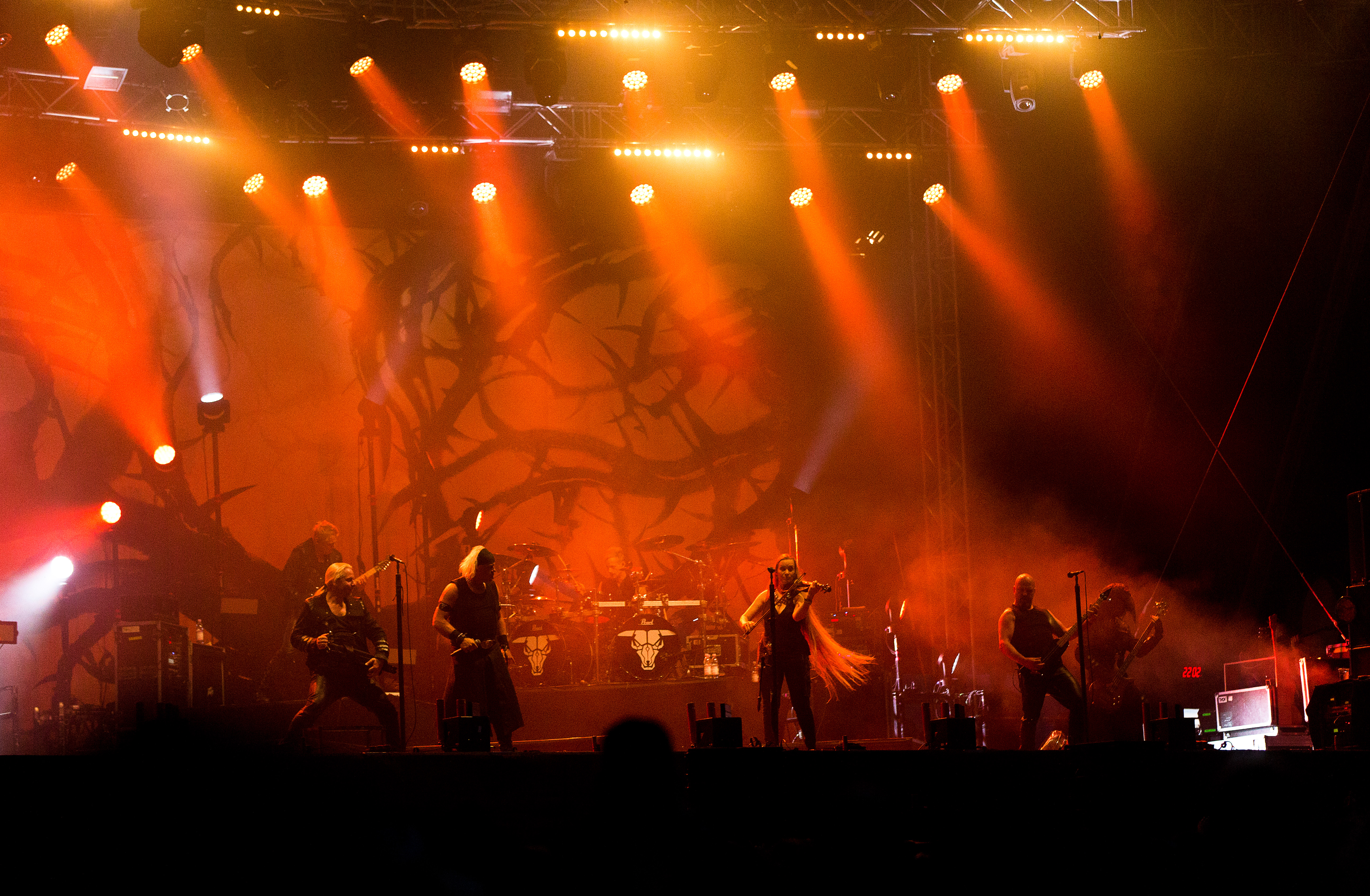
Subway to Sally in 2016

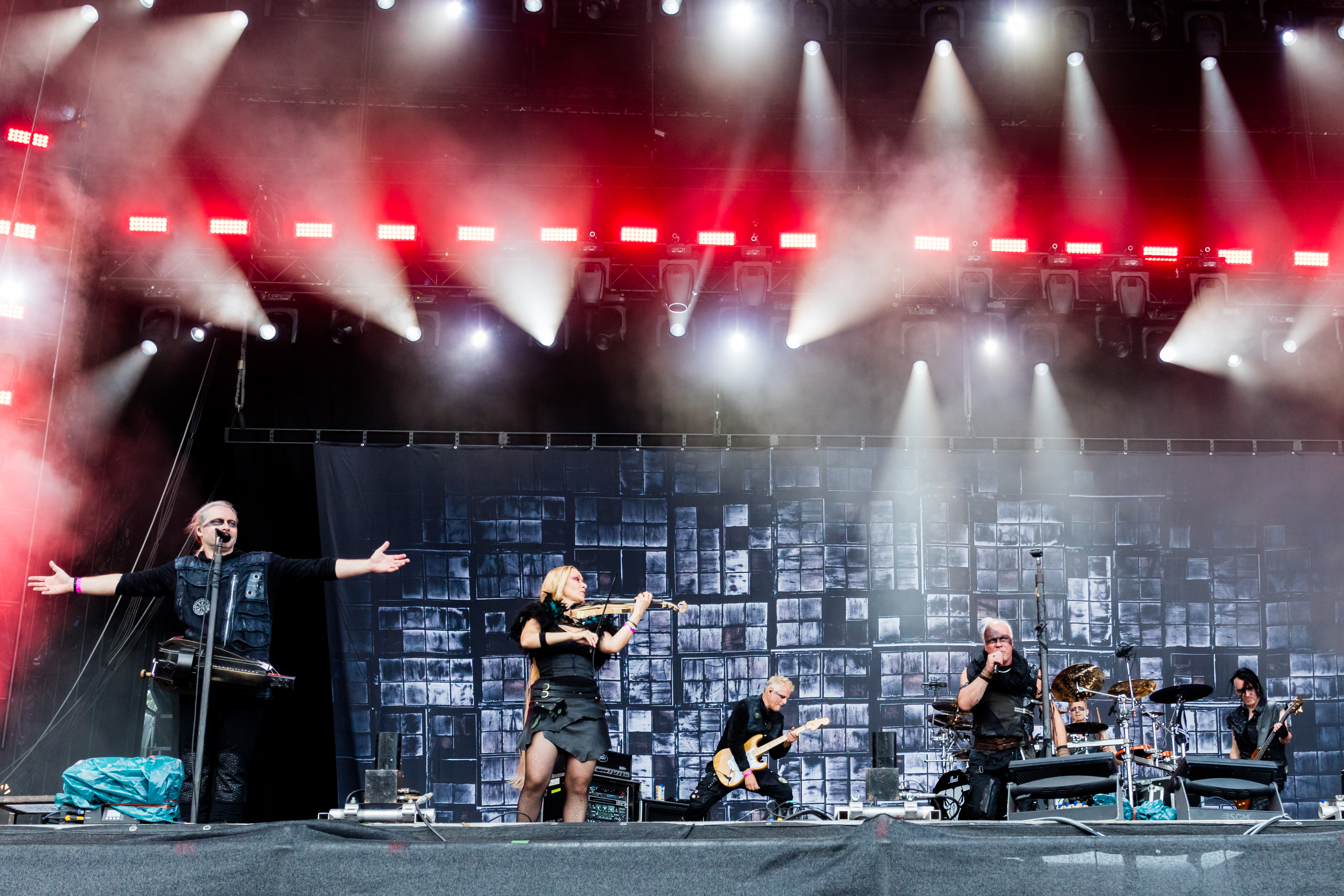
Subway to Sally in 2019

=== Studio ===
- Album 1994 (1994, label: Costbar)
- MCMXCV (1995) (1995, label: Stars in the dark)
- Foppt den Dämon! ("Tease the Demon") (1996, label: Red Rooster)
- Bannkreis ("Spell Circle") (1997, label: BMG/Ariola)
- Hochzeit ("Wedding") (1999, label: BMG/Ariola)
- Herzblut ("Heartblood") (2001, label: Island Mercury)
- Engelskrieger ("Angel Warriors") (2003, label: Motor Music)
- Nord Nord Ost ("North North East") (22 August 2005 label: Nuclear Blast)
- Bastard (2007, label: Nuclear Blast)
- Kreuzfeuer ("Cross-fire") (2009, label: Nuclear Blast)
- Schwarz in Schwarz ("Black in Black") (2011, label: StS Entertainment)
- Mitgift ("Dowry") (2014, label: StS Entertainment)
- Hey! (2019, label: StS Entertainment)
- Himmelfahrt ("Ascension Day") (2023, label: Napalm Records)
- Post Mortem (2024, label: Napalm Records)

=== Live ===
- Schrei! ("Scream!") (live album, 2000, label: BMG/Ariola)
- Subway to Sally Live (2-DVD, 2003, label: Motor Music)
- Nackt ("Naked") (CD/DVD, 10 November, label: Nuclear Blast 2006)
- Nackt II ("Naked II") (CD/DVD, 22 October, label: StS Entertainment 2010)
- Neon (2017, label: StS Entertainment)
- Hey! Live – Alles was das Herz will ("Everything the Heart Wants") (2020, label: StS Entertainment)

=== Compilations ===
- Best of Subway to Sally 1: Die Rose im Wasser ("The Rose in the Water") (BMG, 2001)
- Best of Subway to Sally 2: Kleid aus Rosen ("Gown of Roses") (StS Entertainment, 2010)
