= Fiddler's Green (band) =

German band

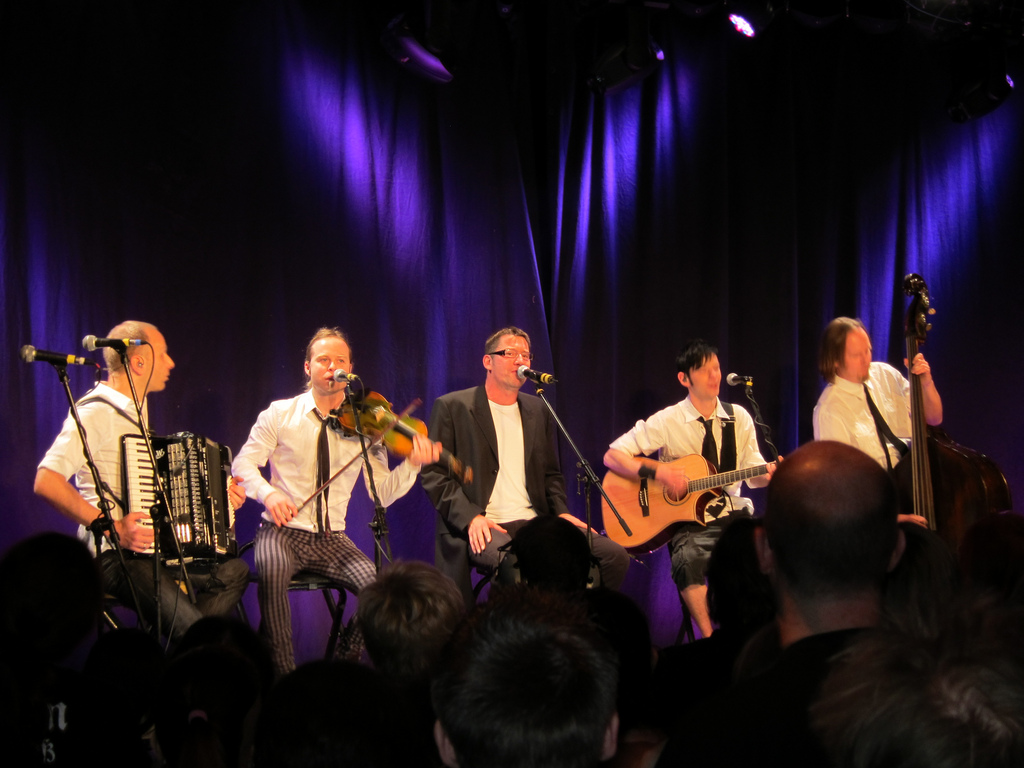
- Fiddler's Green in 2010

Background information
- Origin: Erlangen, Germany
- Genres: Irish folk, Celtic rock, folk rock, folk punk and speedfolk
- Years active: 1990–present
- Label: Deaf Shepherd Records
- Members: Ralf Albers Tobias Anton Heindl; Rainer Schulz; Stefan Klug; Frank Jooss Patrick Prziwara
- Past members: Dr. Robert Oppel (1990–1991) Eric Obst (1990–1995); Wolfram Kellner (1995–2000); Tobias Rempe (1991–1995); Tobias Schäfer (1995–2000) Peter Pathos (Peter Müller) (1990–2006)
- Website: www.fiddlers.de

Fiddler's Green is a German band that plays Irish folk rock. Formed in 1990, their first concert under the name of Fiddler's Green was at the Newcomer-Festival in Erlangen in November 1990. Their debut album entitled "Fiddler's Green" was released in 1992 and featured both live and studio tracks, some traditional and some original material. It was released on their own label, Deaf Shepherd Recordings. The band has been signed to a major label, but chose to go back to being independent. The band members themselves refer to their music as Irish Speedfolk, as opposed to Folk rock or Irish folk.

The band has kept up the mix of traditional Irish or Scottish songs and self-written tracks, though the self-written tracks have progressively become less and less folky. The band's influences are wide and varied, but obviously heavily influenced by Celtic rock bands like the Pogues, the Waterboys and Great Big Sea. Recent albums also see a clear influence from Gothic rock music. Having enjoyed growing success in and around Germany, the band reached 1000 played concerts in 2004 (the only band member to play them all is bass player Rainer Schulz), which was celebrated with a concert at Castle Hoheneck. This concert was filmed and released on two DVDs: Celebrate! and Jubilate! The concert saw participation from former band members and other guest musicians. Main lyric and music writer Peter Pathos left the band in summer 2006 and was replaced by Patrick 'Pat' Prziwara. A live DVD Folk's not dead was released to celebrate the band's 20th anniversary in 2010.

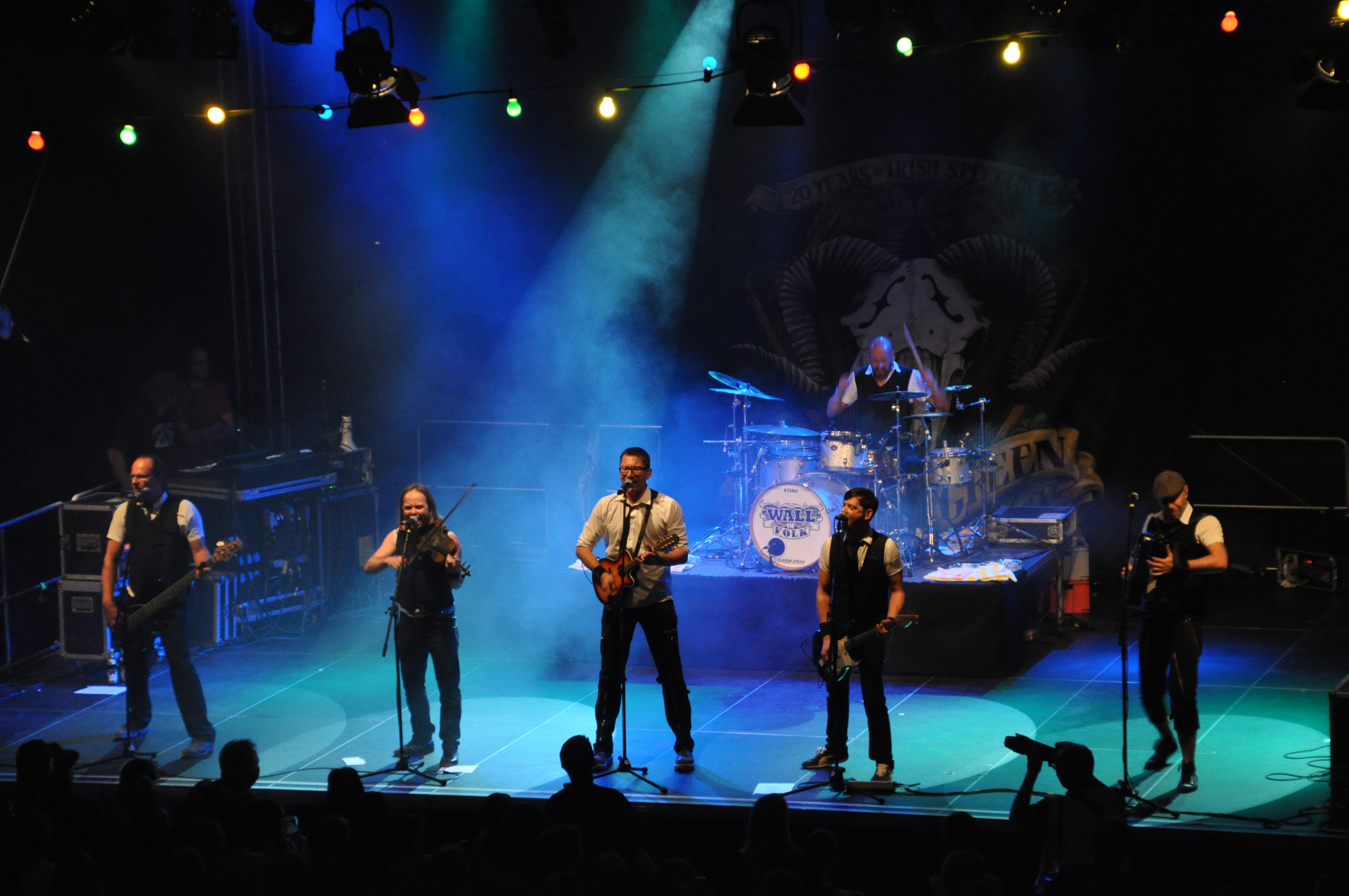
Fiddler's Green performing at the "Folk am Neckar" folk festival 2013 in Neckarelz

== Members ==
=== Current lineup ===
- Ralf "Albi" Albers - vocals, guitar, Irish bouzouki, mandolin (1990–present)
- Rainer Schulz - bass (1990–present)
- Stefan Klug - accordion, bodhrán (1991–present)
- Tobias Heindl - violin, vocals (2000–present)
- Frank Jooss - drums, percussion (2001–present)
- Patrick "Pat" Prziwara - vocals, guitar (2006–present)

=== Former members ===
- Robert Oppel - violin (1990–1991)
- Eric Obst - drums (1990–1995)
- Tobias Rempe - violin (1991–1995)
- Tobias Schäfer - violin (1995–2000)
- Wolfram Kellner - drums (1995–2001)
- Peter Pathos - guitar, mandolin, banjo, flute (1990–2006)

Fiddler’s Green, band members at Rockharz 2026

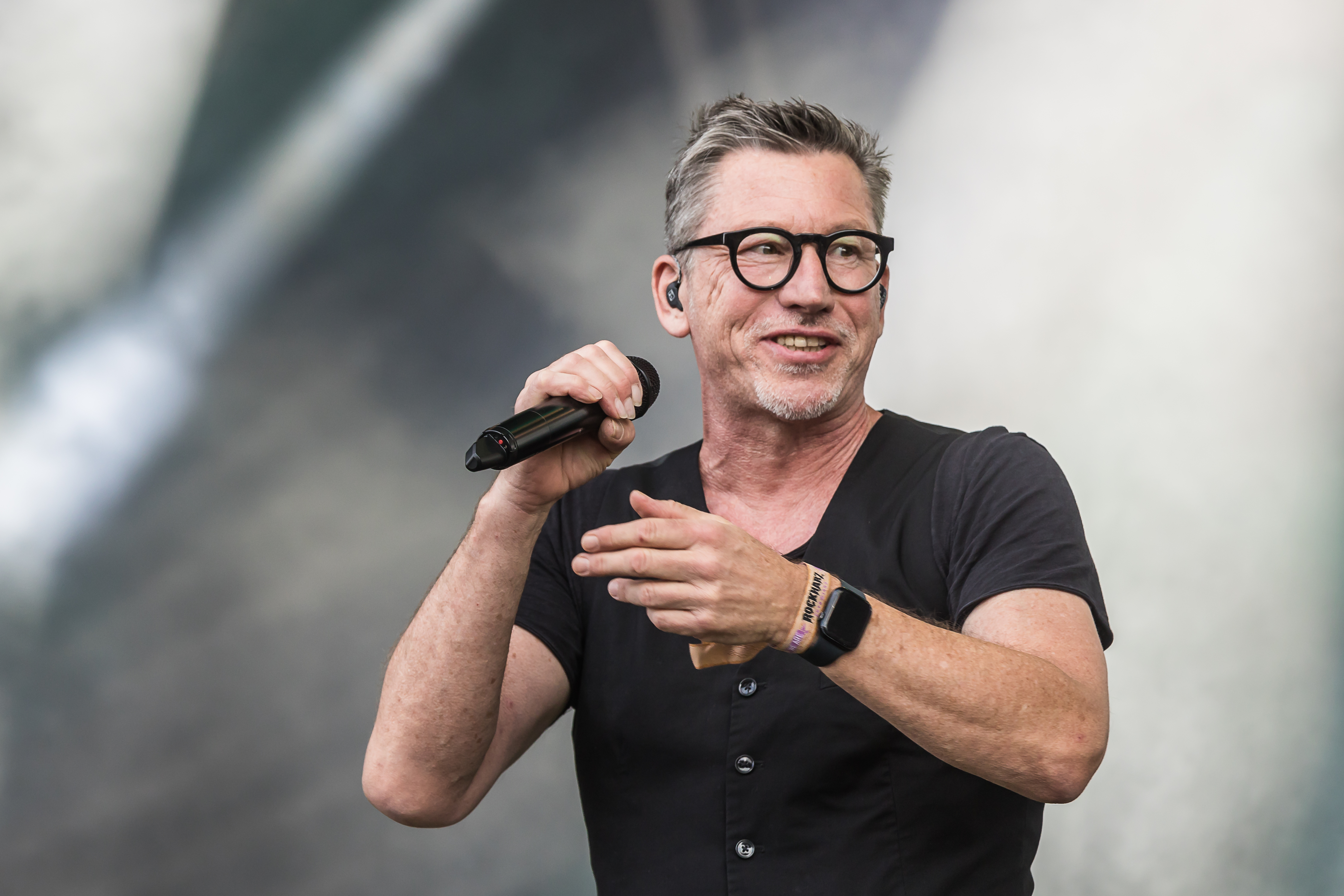
Ralf „Albi“ Albers, vocals, guitar, Irish bouzouki

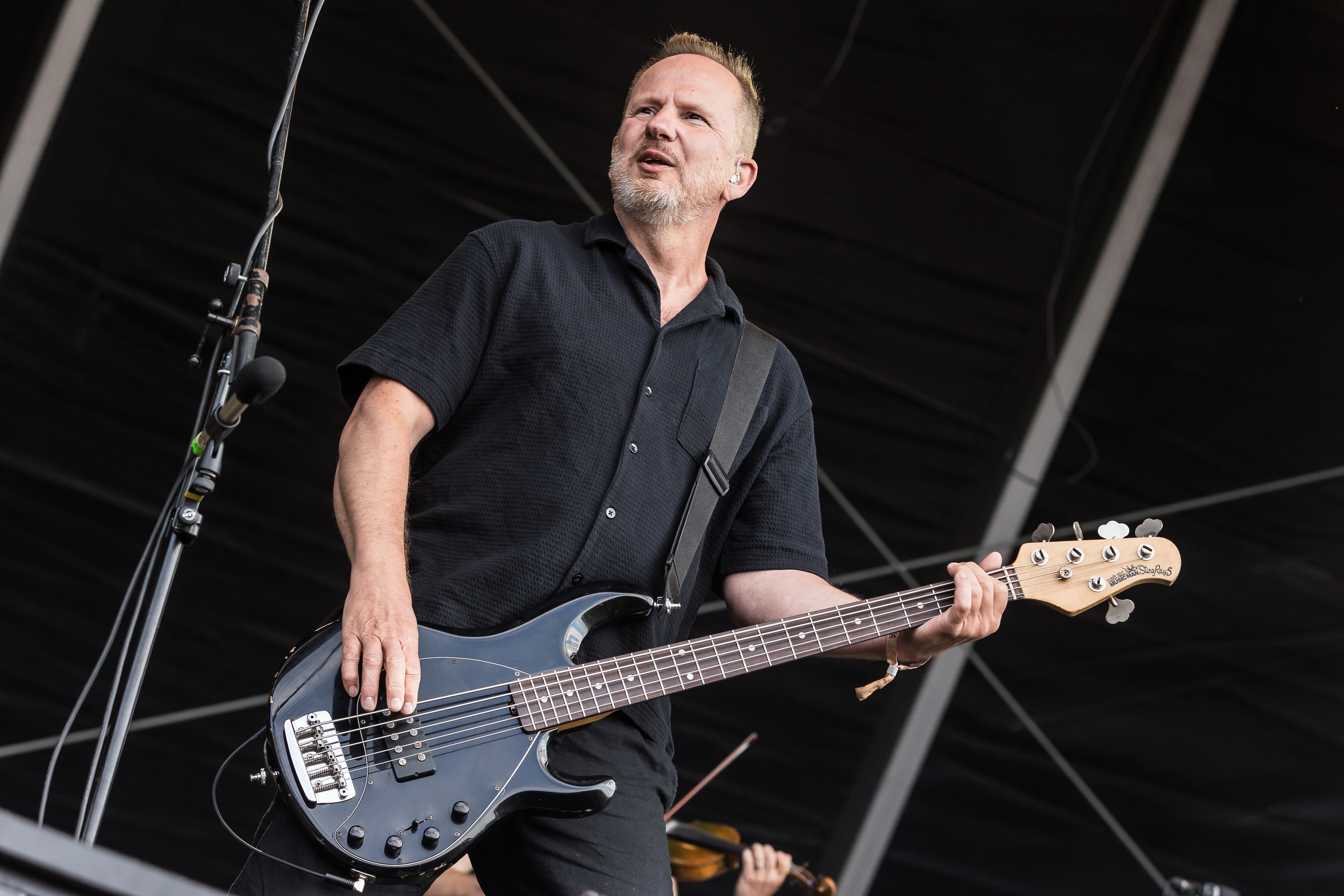
Rainer Schulz, bass

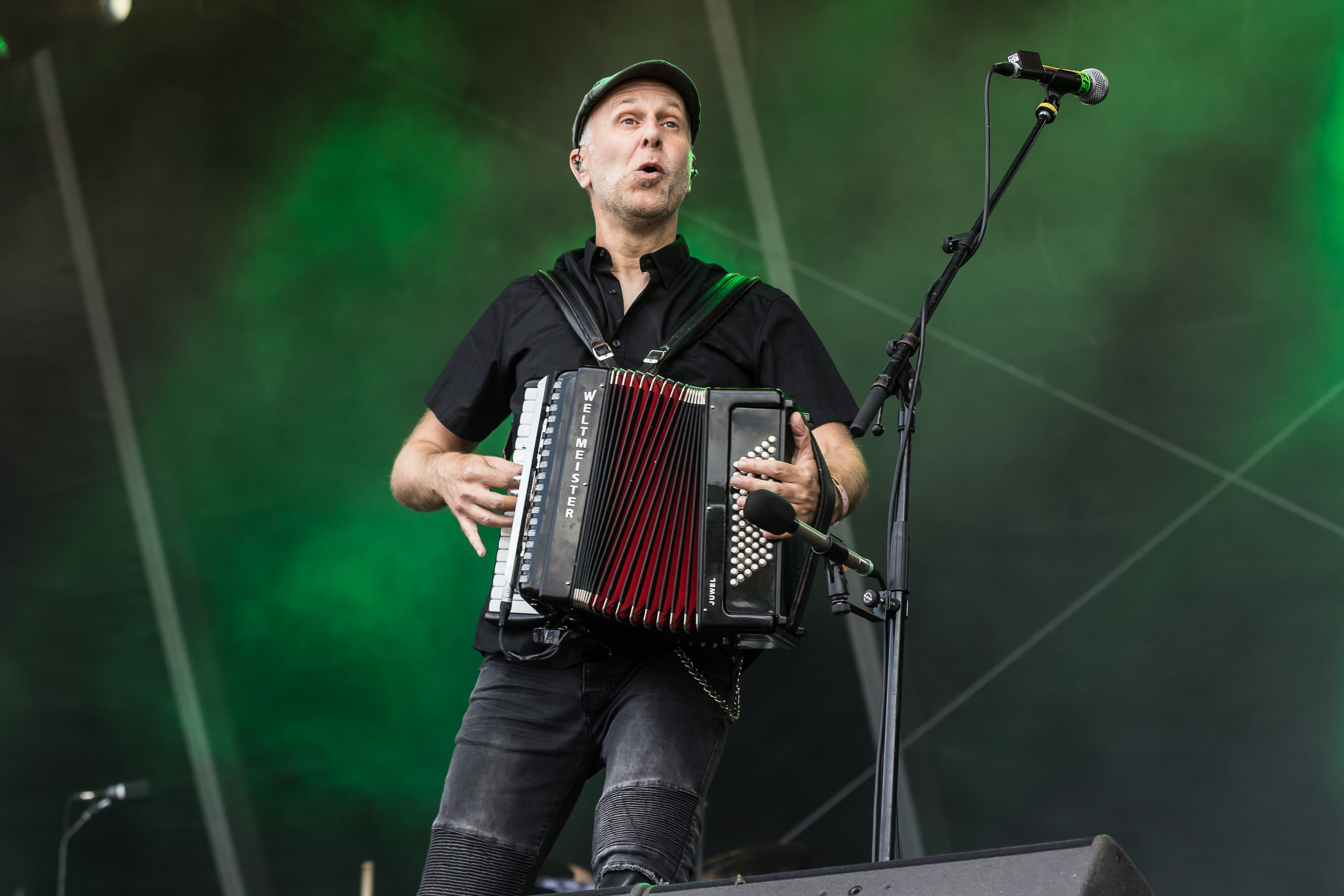
Stefan Klug, accordion, bodhrán

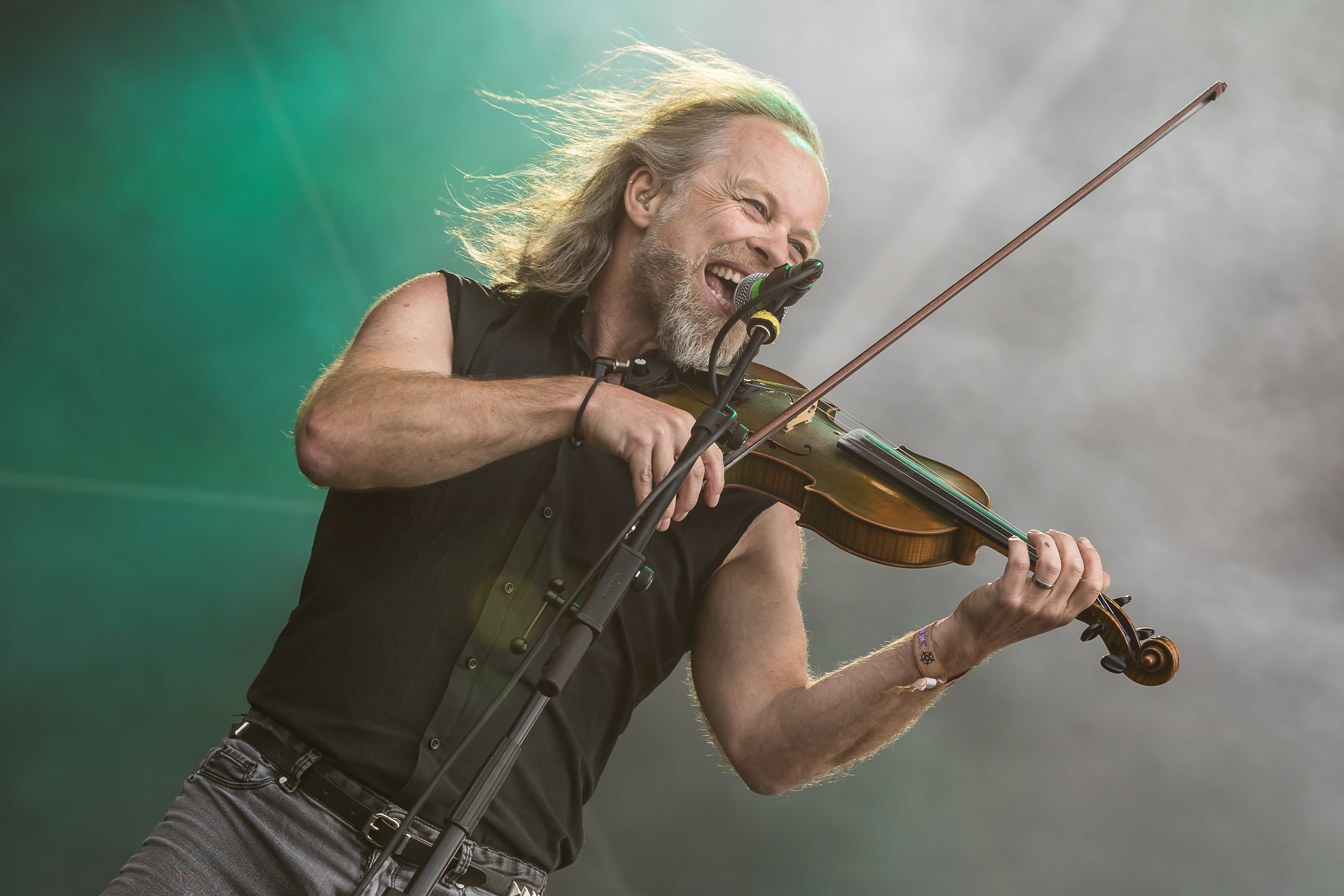
Tobias Heindl, violin, vocals

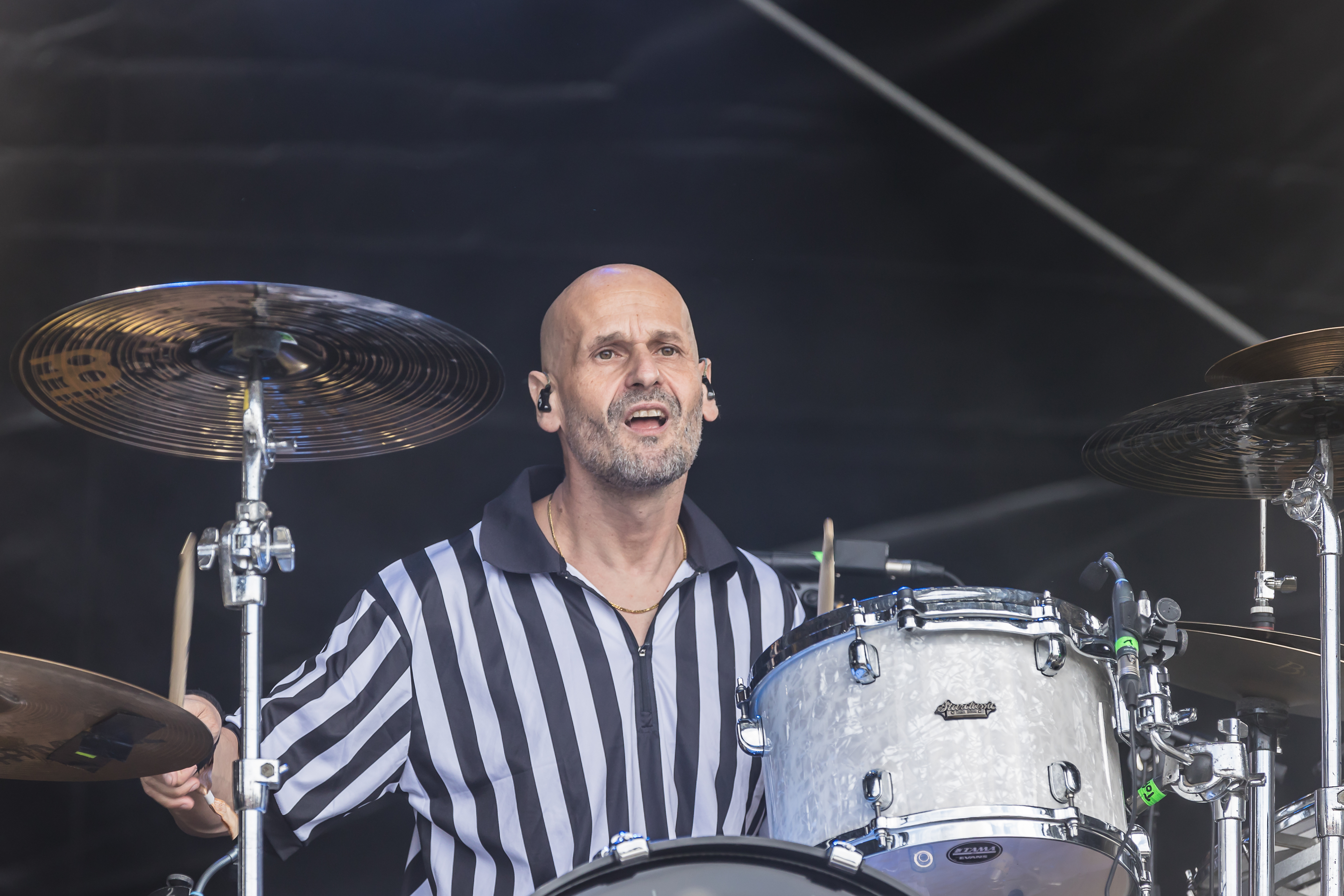
Frank Jooss, drums, percussion

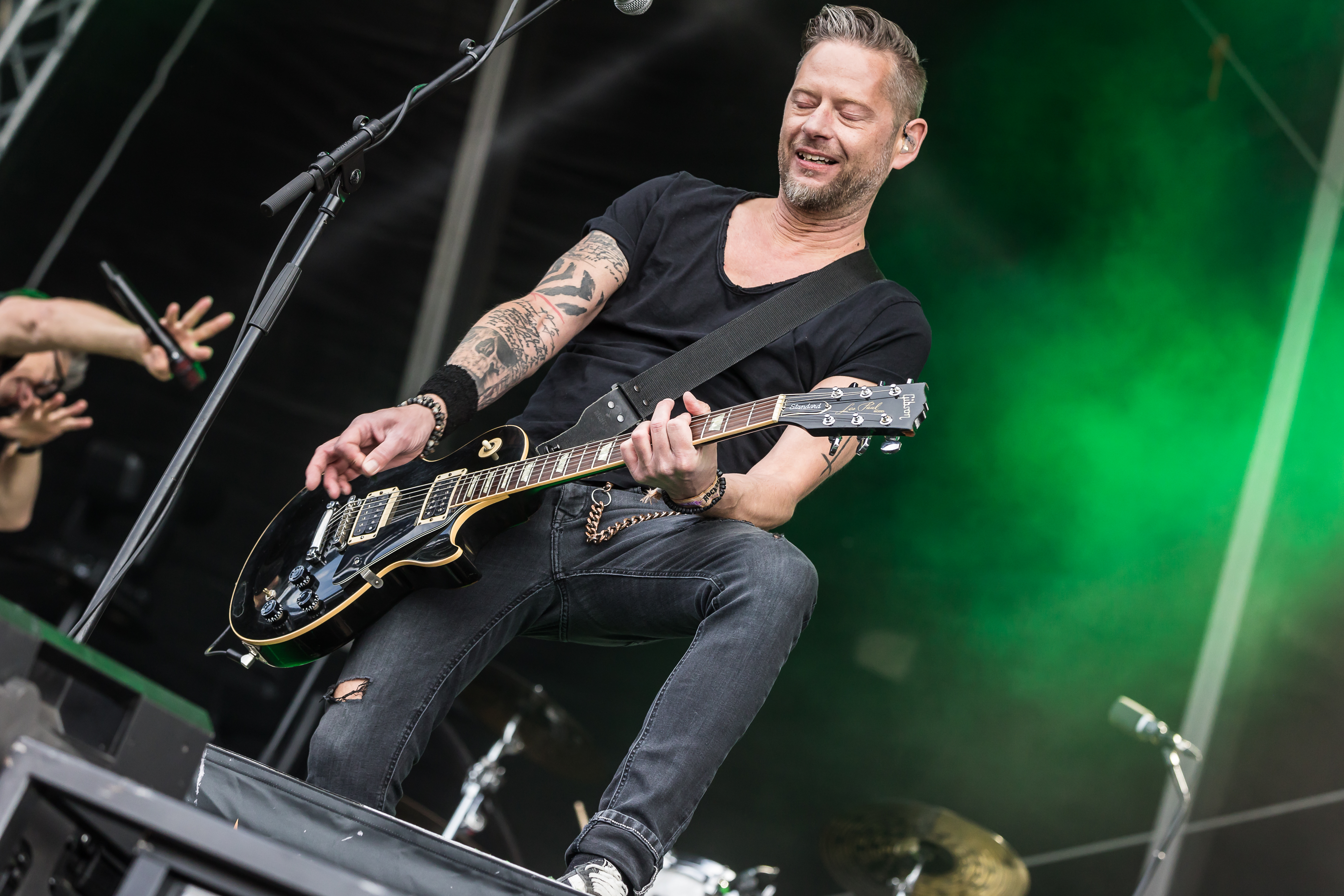
Patrick „Pat“ Prziwara, vocals, guitar

== Discography ==
=== Studio albums ===
Year	Title	German album charts
1992	Fiddler's Green	—
1993	Black Sheep	—
1995	King Shepherd	—
1997	On and On	61
1998	Spin Around	—
2000	Another Sky	—
2002	Folk Raider	—
2003	Nu Folk	—
2007	Drive Me Mad!	74
2009	Sports Day at Killaloe	52
2011	Wall of Folk	24
2013	Winners & Boozers	7
2016	Devil's Dozen	22
2019	Heyday	7
2020	3 Cheers for 30 Years	91
2022	Seven Holy Nights	40
2023	The Green Machine	5

=== Live albums ===
Year	Title	German album charts
1993	Stagebox	—
2005	Celebrate!	—
2005	Jubilate! (DVD)	—
2010	Folk's not dead (DVD)	76
2012	Acoustic Pub Crawl (unplugged)	—
2015	25 Blarney Roses: Live from Cologne	—

=== Other albums ===
Year	Title	German album charts
1996	Make Up Your Mind	—
2015	25 Blarney Roses	30
