= Princess of the Night =

Single by Saxon

from the album Denim and Leather
- Released: 23 October 1981
- Recorded: 1981
- Genre: Heavy metal, power metal
- Length: 4:01
- Label: Capitol
- Songwriter: Saxon
- Producer: Nigel Thomas

Saxon singles chronology
"Never Surrender" (1981)	"Princess of the Night" (1981)	"Power and the Glory" (1983)

"Princess of the Night" is a single by British heavy metal band Saxon, featured as the opening track and single from their 1981 album Denim and Leather; the song was written as a group production of all five members of the band at the time: Peter "Biff" Byford, Steve Dawson, Pete Gill, Graham Oliver, and Paul Quinn. The lyrics of the song deal with the narrator's affinity of a steam locomotive of the LMS Princess Royal Class.

The single itself peaked in its popularity at 57 on the UK Singles Chart.

== Background ==
Saxon are from Barnsley, an industrial town in north-central England with several railways. According to singer Biff Byford, Barnsley is famous for "bus scrapyards". In 1981, Byford said, "Princess of the Night is a song about a steam train that ends up on the scrapyard."

Later in 1981, Byford added, "Some time ago we used to park our van at Barry Island in Glamorgan. There's a huge compound there where they keep all the old steam trains that they don't use anymore. They're just left to rot and I suppose that upset us because they really were magnificent machines. Well you can't beat the days of steam can you?

"Anyway, late at night if I couldn't sleep I used to look out at those ghostly engines and imagine them painted up and back in their glory. It's my romantic side coming out again."

== Personnel ==
- Biff Byford – vocals
- Paul Quinn – guitars (first guitar solo)
- Graham Oliver – guitars (second guitar solo)
- Steve Dawson – bass
- Pete Gill – drums
