= Traumtänzer =

Studio album by Schandmaul
- Released: 28 January 2011
- Recorded: Principal Studios; Turnstyle Studio; Jamlabor
- Genre: Medieval folk rock, folk rock, folk metal
- Length: 56:27
- Language: German
- Label: Fame Recordings
- Producer: Thomas Heimann-Trosien

Schandmaul chronology
Sinnfonie (2009)	Traumtänzer (2011)	Unendlich (2014)

Traumtänzer is the seventh studio album by the German Medieval folk rock band Schandmaul. It was released on 28. January 2011 on CD, double vinyl record, and as extended edition (containing the CD and a "making of" DVD).

In cooperation with Fantasy author Wolfgang Hohlbein the track "Geas Traum [Gea's dream]" references his novel Infinity – Der Turm which was published in February 2011.

== Reception ==
Professional ratings
Review scores
Source	Rating
Metal Hammer	6/7 stars
Sonic Seducer	favourable

A review in the German edition of Metal Hammer lauded the diversity of emotions within the different songs and concluded that the creative pause since the predecessor album Anderswelt had been used well by Schandmaul. The Sonic Seducer magazine called the album innovative and sovereign and also noted a certain tranquility that had come from the band's hiatus.

== Chart performance ==
Traumtänzer peaked at position 4 in the German Media Control Charts, at position 10 in the Austrian Top 75 album charts and at position 36 in the Swiss Albums Top 100.

== Track listing ==
All music is composed by Schandmaul

No.	Title	Lyrics	Length
1.	"Traumtänzer"	Birgit Muggenthaler-Schmack	4:07
2.	"Der Alchemist"	Muggenthaler-Schmack	3:53
3.	"Auf hoher See"	Anna Kränzlein	4:42
4.	"Hexeneinmaleins"	Muggenthaler-Schmack	3:27
5.	"Bis zum Morgengrauen"	Kränzlein	4:02
6.	"Die Rosen"	Thomas Lindner	3:58
7.	"Schwur"	Muggenthaler-Schmack	4:45
8.	"Pakt"	Kränzlein	2:54
9.	"Der Anker"	Matthias Richter, Lindner	4:03
10.	"Geas Traum"	Lindner	4:30
11.	"Assassine"	Lindner	4:39
12.	"Halt mich"	Muggenthaler-Schmack	4:24
13.	"Des Dichters Segen"	Lindner	3:07
14.	"Mein Lied"	Kränzlein	4:17
