= Anna Katharina Kränzlein =

German violinist (born 1980)

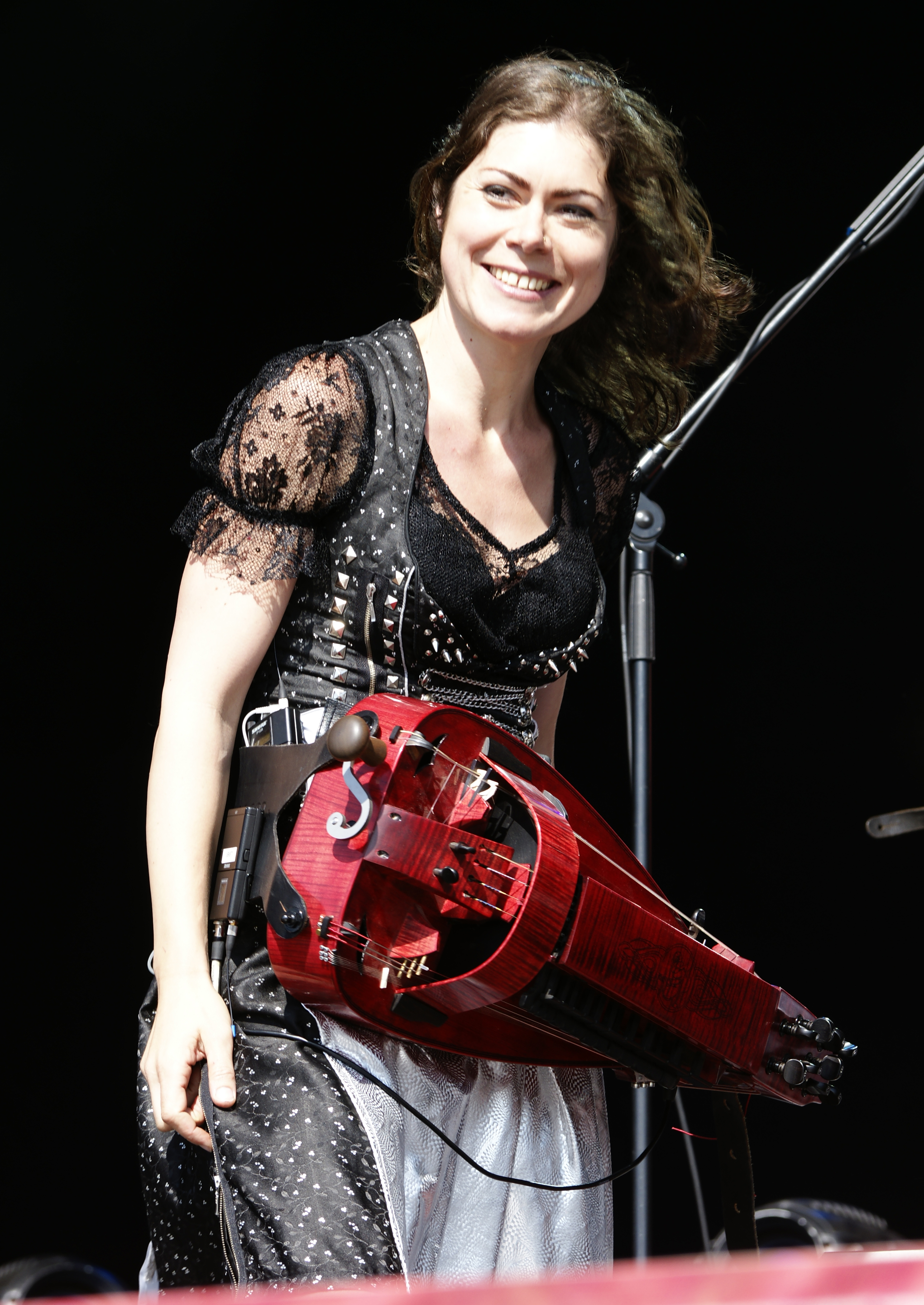
- Anna Katharina in 2015

Background information
- Born: 7 November 1980 (age 44)
- Origin: Fürstenfeldbruck, Germany
- Genres: Medieval folk rock, Folk metal, Classical
- Instrument(s): Violin, Viola, hurdy-gurdy, recorder, western concert flute, Voice
- Years active: 1992 – present
- Labels: Fame recordings, Edel
- Formerly of: Schandmaul
- Website: http://www.annakatharina.de/

Anna Katharina Kränzlein, also known as Anna Katharina, (born 7 November 1980 in Fürstenfeldbruck, Germany) is a German violinist. She is most known for her quick and varied technique. She is the youngest founding member of Medieval folk rock/folk metal band Schandmaul.

== Biography ==
Kränzlein grew up in Puchheim near Munich and made first musical experiences aged five when she autodidactically learned to play the recorder. Within the next ten years she expanded her repertoire with the western concert flute whereby she won the Bavarian state level awards of Jugend musiziert two times.

At age eight she received her first violin lesson by Simone Burger-Michielsen, who kindled Kränzlein's love for classical music. From age twelve on, she played with the newly founded Puchheim Youth Chamber Orchestra and was concertmaster under Peter Michielsen from 1997 on who also used to be her violin teacher for several years. Concert tours with this orchestra led her to Hungary, Italy, Denmark, Belgium, the Netherlands and Japan. Later she played violin and viola with the Bavarian State Youth Orchestra.

She is an eightfold winner of the German national Jugend musiziert prize, for solo violin and ensembles. Aged 14 she also learned to play piano because this is the requirement to study violin at musical schools in Germany. Her teacher was the mother of later Schandmaul guitarist Martin Duckstein.

In the spring of 1998, her band Schandmaul would gather for the first time. Originally the project had only been planned for a single concert but the great request for CDs during their performance in Gröbenzell made them continue the band. Their recordings sold more than 300,000 items. The last album Anderswelt peaked at rank 8 of the German charts and their tours saw sold-out venues in Germany, Switzerland, Austria and the Benelux states.

Kränzlein came across the hurdy-gurdy in 2000 when she met hurdy-gurdy maker Karl Riedl and built an instrument with him for her specialised course in music at school. Since the second Schandmaul album, she plays the hurdy-gurdy with the band, since the fourth album she also participates in texting and composing and with the fifth album she also contributed viola parts. From 1998 to 2000, Kränzlein read music at the Munich Conservatory with Urs Stieler. In 2001, she moved to the Saar University of Music at Saarbrücken where she studied with Ulrike Dierick. There she played with the University Orchestra under Max Pommer and violinist virtuoso and conductor Maxim Vengerov. In 2003 Kränzlein enrolled at the Würzburg University of Music, joining the class of Max Speermann, where she graduated in 2006. Since 2001 she moreover takes lessons in classical song.

In 2007, she published Neuland (lit.: new territory) the first album in a solo career that had been in planning before. It features a mix of five classical pieces and four own compositions that were recorded with violin, viola and also hurdy-gurdy. Another two tracks were her debut as a classical singer. Guest musicians include bassist Matthias Richter (Schandmaul, Weto) and drummer Curt Cress (Tina Turner, Queen, Falco). Anna Kränzlein went on tour with Letzte Instanz in February 2008 and also performs solo as Anna Katharina.

In October 2009, Kränzlein published her second solo album Saitensprung on Fame Recordings. The third studio album Dreiklang was released in October 2012.

She left Schandmaul in August 2017.

== Discography ==
=== Solo albums ===
- Neuland, Fame Recordings, Edel (distribution), 2007
- Saitensprung, Fame Recordings, Edel (distribution), 2009
- Dreiklang, Fame Recordings, Sony (distribution), 2012

=== Schandmaul ===
- Wahre Helden, self-distribution, 1998
- Von Spitzbuben und anderen Halunken, self-distribution, 2000
- Narrenkönig, Fame Recordings, Edel (distribution), 2002
- Hexenkessel (live CD and DVD), Fame Recordings, Edel (distribution), 2003
- Wie Pech & Schwefel, Fame Recordings, Edel (distribution), 2004
- Kunststück (live CD and DVD), Fame Recordings, Edel (distribution), 2004
- Bin Unterwegs (with orchestra), Single, Fame Recordings, Edel (distribution), 2005
- Wahre Helden Fame Recordings, Edel (distribution) 2005
- Von Spitzbuben & Anderen Halunken, Fame Recordings, Edel (distribution) 2005
- Immer noch Wach (feat. Tanzwut) 2005
- Picture Vinyl, vinyl record, 2006
- "Kein Weg zu Weit", single, Fame Recordings, Edel (distribution), 2006
- Mit Leib und Seele, Fame Recordings, Edel (distribution), 2006
- Anderswelt, Fame Recordings, Edel (distribution), 2008
- Sinnbilder (DVD; portrait and live concert of the 2007 Wacken Open Air), Fame Recordings, Edel (distribution), 2008
- Sinnfonie (live CD and DVD, Portrait and live concert of the 2007 Wacken Open Air plus Andersvolk - Der Fan Film), Fame Recordings, Edel (distribution), 2009
- Traumtänzer, Fame Recordings, Sony Music (distribution), 2011
- Unendlich, Universal, 2014
- Leuchtfeuer, Vertigo, 2016

=== Guest musician ===
- Weto – Tatort Bühne, self-distribution, 1996
- Letzte Instanz – Die weiße Reise: Live In Dresden, Drakkar, 2008
- Letzte Instanz – Weißgold (Live double DVD, contains also excerpts from the Anna Katharina concert), Sony Music, 2008
- Sava – Metamorphosis, Banshee Records/KOM 4 Medien; Alive (distribution), 2008
