= Wie Pech & Schwefel =

Studio album by Schandmaul
- Released: 26 April 2004
- Recorded: Pilot Studio, Tommy Hein Studio
- Genre: Medieval metal
- Length: 62:46
- Language: German
- Label: Fame Recordings
- Producer: Thomas Heimann-Trosien

Schandmaul chronology
Narrenkönig (2002)	Wie Pech & Schwefel (2004)	Mit Leib und Seele (2006)

Wie Pech & Schwefel is the fourth album released by Schandmaul on 26 April 2004. It remained in the German Longplay Charts for six weeks, peaking at #13.

== Track listing ==
No.	Title	Lyrics	Music	Length
1.	"Leb!"	Birgit Muggenthaler	Thomas Lindner, Muggenthaler	3:52
2.	"Drachentöter"	Lindner	Lindner	4:22
3.	"Tyrann"	Muggenthaler	Lindner, Muggenthaler	3:47
4.	"Kalte Spuren"	Anna Kränzlein	Lindner, Kränzlein	5:11
5.	"Geisterschiff"	Lindner	Lindner	4:27
6.	"Das Tuch"	Lindner	Lindner, Matthias Richter	4:41
7.	"Stein der Weisen"	Muggenthaler	Lindner, Muggenthaler	5:13
8.	"Der Sumpf"	Lindner	Lindner	5:01
9.	"Das Duell"	Lindner	Lindner	3:21
10.	"Die Flucht"	Lindner	Richter	4:03
11.	"Der Schatz"	Lindner	Lindner	3:49
12.	"Reich der Träume"	Muggenthaler	Lindner, Muggenthaler	5:06
13.	"Klagelied"	Muggenthaler	Muggenthaler	4:04
14.	"Verbotener Kuss"	Lindner	Lindner, Martin Duckstein	3:47
15.	"Folk You"		Kränzlein	3:52

== Personnel ==
- Thomas Lindner – vocals, acoustic guitar, accordion
- Birgit Muggenthaler-Schmack – flutes, shawms, bagpipe, vocals
- Martin "Ducky" Duckstein – electric guitar, acoustic guitar, classical guitar, vocals
- Stefan Brunner – drums, percussion, vocals
- Matthias Richter – bass, upright bass
- Anna Kränzlein – violin, hurdy-gurdy, vocal
- Dominik Büll – cello on 4, 6
- Oliver s. Tyr (Faun) – celtic harp on 7
- Claas Triebel – choir arrangement on 12
