= Tjark =

Tjark is a masculine given name of Frisian origin, especially used in East Frisia and in the Netherlands. Notable people with the name include:

- Tjark Ernst (born 2003), German footballer
- Tjark Evers (1840s–1866), sailor from East Frisia
- Tjark Scheller (born 2002), German footballer
- Tjark de Vries (born 1965), Dutch rower
