= Anderswelt =

Studio album by Schandmaul
- Released: 4 April 2008
- Recorded: October 2007 to January 2008 at HOFA-Studios, Turnstyle Studio
- Genres: Medieval folk rock, Medieval metal
- Length: 51:58
- Language: German
- Label: F.A.M.E. Recordings
- Producer: Thomas Heimann-Trosien

Schandmaul chronology
| Mit Leib und Seele (2006) | Anderswelt (2008) | Sinnfonie (2009) |

Professional ratings
Review scores
| Source | Rating |
|---|---|
| Sonic Seducer | favourable |
| Stormbringer | 5/5 stars |

Anderswelt is the sixth album released by the German Medieval folk rock band Schandmaul on 4 April 2008. It was recorded from October 2007 to January 2007 at Turnstyle Studio, Berlin, and the HOFA Studios in Karlsdorf and was produced by Thomas Heimann-Trosien. The album contains 14 tracks, including an instrumental, "Fiddlefolkpunk". Thematically, the album focusses on creatures of mythology like sirens ("Sirenen"), werewolves ("Wolfsmensch") and spirits (as in "Stunde des Lichts"). The track "Drei Lieder" (Three Songs) tells of a young bard who participates in a singers' competition to take revenge on the prince who once destroyed his native village and killed his only brother. "Die Königin" (The Queen) is about a bewitched woman who was once good-natured but has been turned into a dragon. The track "Anderswelt"(Other-world) deals with mysterious sightings of figures from the Other-world who were spotted near a Celtic shrine.

== Reception ==
The album remained in the German Longplay Charts for fifteen weeks, peaking at #8, in the Austrian charts for 3 weeks, peaking at #43 and in the Swiss charts for 2 weeks, peaking at #44. The Austrian webzine Stormbringer lauded the album's diversity and balance and rated it five stars out of five. The German Sonic Seducer magazine wrote that the general tone of Anderswelt was more positive and brighter than that of Schandmaul's prior album Mit Leib und Seele.

== Track listing ==
All music is composed by Schandmaul.

| No. | Title | Lyrics | Length |
|---|---|---|---|
| 1. | "Frei" | Birgit Muggenthaler | 4:07 |
| 2. | "Krieger" | Thomas Lindner | 3:50 |
| 3. | "Anderswelt" | Lindner | 4:05 |
| 4. | "Königin" | Lindner | 4:06 |
| 5. | "Zweite Seele" | Muggenthaler | 3:39 |
| 6. | "Die Braut" | Muggenthaler | 4:51 |
| 7. | "Missgeschick" | Lindner | 3:26 |
| 8. | "Sirenen" | Muggenthaler | 4:08 |
| 9. | "Stunde des Lichts" | Anna Kränzlein | 3:47 |
| 10. | "Fiddlefolkpunk" (instrumental) | | 1:49 |
| 11. | "Augen auf!" | Kränzlein | 3:25 |
| 12. | "Wolfsmensch" | Lindner | 3:20 |
| 13. | "Drei Lieder" | Lindner | 4:06 |
| 14. | "Prinzessin" | Kränzlein | 3:29 |
| Total length: | | | 51:58 |

== Personnel ==
Musicians

- Matthias Richter – electric bass, double bass
- Birgit Muggenthaler-Schmack – bagpipes, flutes, shawm, vocals
- Stefan Brunner – drums, percussion, vocals
- Anna Kränzlein – violin, viola, hurdy-gurdy, vocals
- Martin Duckstein – electric guitar, classical guitar, vocals
- Thomas Lindner – lead vocals, acoustic guitar

Guest musicians

- Benni Cellini (Letzte Instanz) – cello on "Krieger", "Königin", "Die Braut", "Augen auf!" and "Prinzessin"

Production

- Thomas Heiman-Trosien – mixing, mastering
- Thomas von Kummant – title and booklet illustrations
- Volker Beushausen – photography
- Thomas Bürgerle – artwork
