= Tjark Evers =

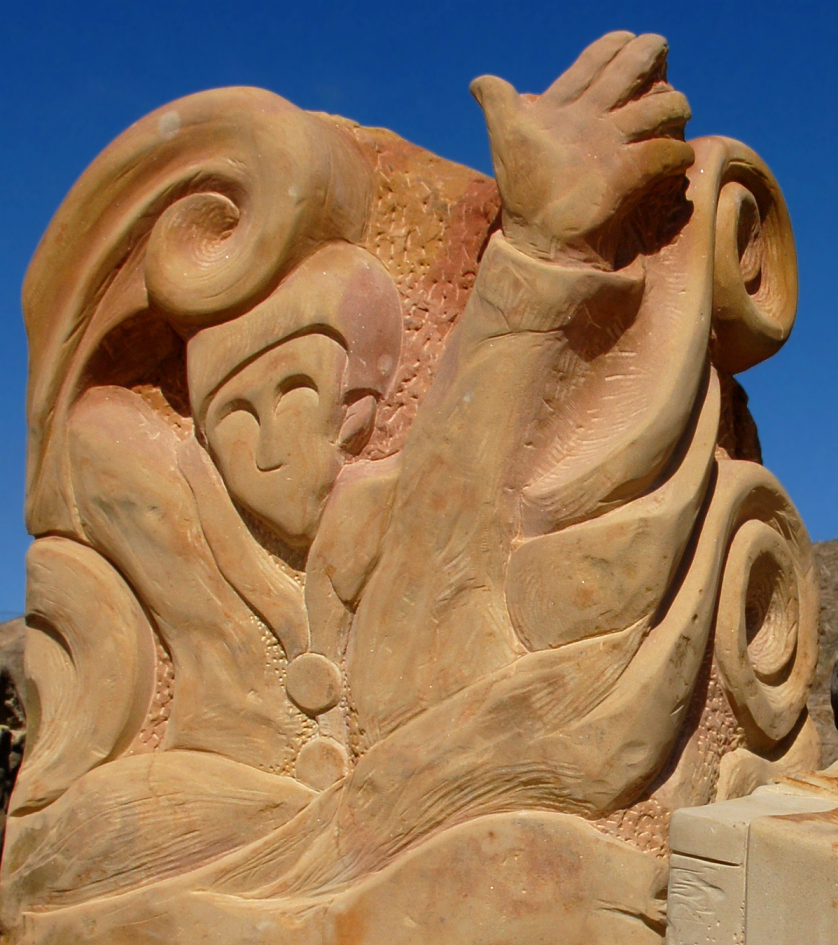
Tjark Evers as depicted on a monument.

Tjark Ulrich Honken Evers (c. 21 December 1845 – 23 December 1866) was a sailor from the German North Sea island of Baltrum. His tragic fate by drowning in the Wadden Sea made him notable soon after his death and he became known beyond his native region of East Frisia.

Tjark Evers was born in December 1845 on Baltrum island to shipmaster Honke Eilts Evers. His family had strong ties to the island. His brother Eilt Honken Evers became a captain as well as head of the parish and community of Baltrum. Also Tjark became a seaman and would attend a navigator's school at Timmel (now a part of Großefehn) in mainland East Frisia during wintertime to prepare for his navigator's exam.

At Christmas 1866, Evers wanted to pay a surprise visit to his parents in Baltrum and boarded a small rowing boat early on 23 December at the harbour of Westaccumersiel. A man from Langeoog island went also on board. Both of them should be ferried to their respective islands. In a thick fog, the crew first rowed to the beach of Langeoog and delivered their first passenger. From there, they intended to row to a Baltrum beach. Convinced to have reached the latter island, they berthed at a sandy shoreline and Tjark Evers departed the vessel. The boat then rowed away in the mist. Soon Evers noticed though that he had not reached Baltrum but had been left at a shoal in the Accumer Ee gat which would submerge during high tide. Realising that he was about to drown without any hope of being rescued, Evers wrote a farewell letter into his notebook. He sent greetings to his parents and siblings and wrote down prayers and thoughts. His letter reads as follows (translated from the original):

Dear mother! May God comfort you for your son is no more. I am standing here asking God for forgiveness of my sins. Greetings to all of you. The water is now reaching up to my knees, I will have to drown soon as there is no help available. May God have mercy upon the sinner that is I. It is nine o'clock, you are about to go to church, be sure to just pray for me so God will have mercy.

Dear parents, brothers and sisters, I am standing on a shoal and must drown, I will not happen to see you once more nor will you see me again. May God have mercy on me and comfort you. I will put this book into a box of cigars. God make it so that you receive these lines written by my hand. I am greeting you for one last time. May God forgive my sins and receive me in His Kingdom of Heaven. Amen.
To shipmaster H. E. Evers Baltrum
T U H Evers
I am T. Evers of Baltrum.

The finder is kindly asked to send this book to my parents to Cpt. H. E. Evers Baltrum island.

Evers put his notebook into a box of cigars which he had brought as a gift and wrapped the box into a handkerchief. The box was washed ashored at Wangerooge where it was found on 3 January 1867. Tjark Evers' body was never found. His death is certified in the journal of the Baltrum Lutheran parish as well as by the numerous search requests published by his parents in regional newspapers of 1867.

Death by drowning was not uncommon at the time in this region, but the exceptional circumstances and the preserved letter of farewell made Evers' case a special one.

== Memorial and legacy ==
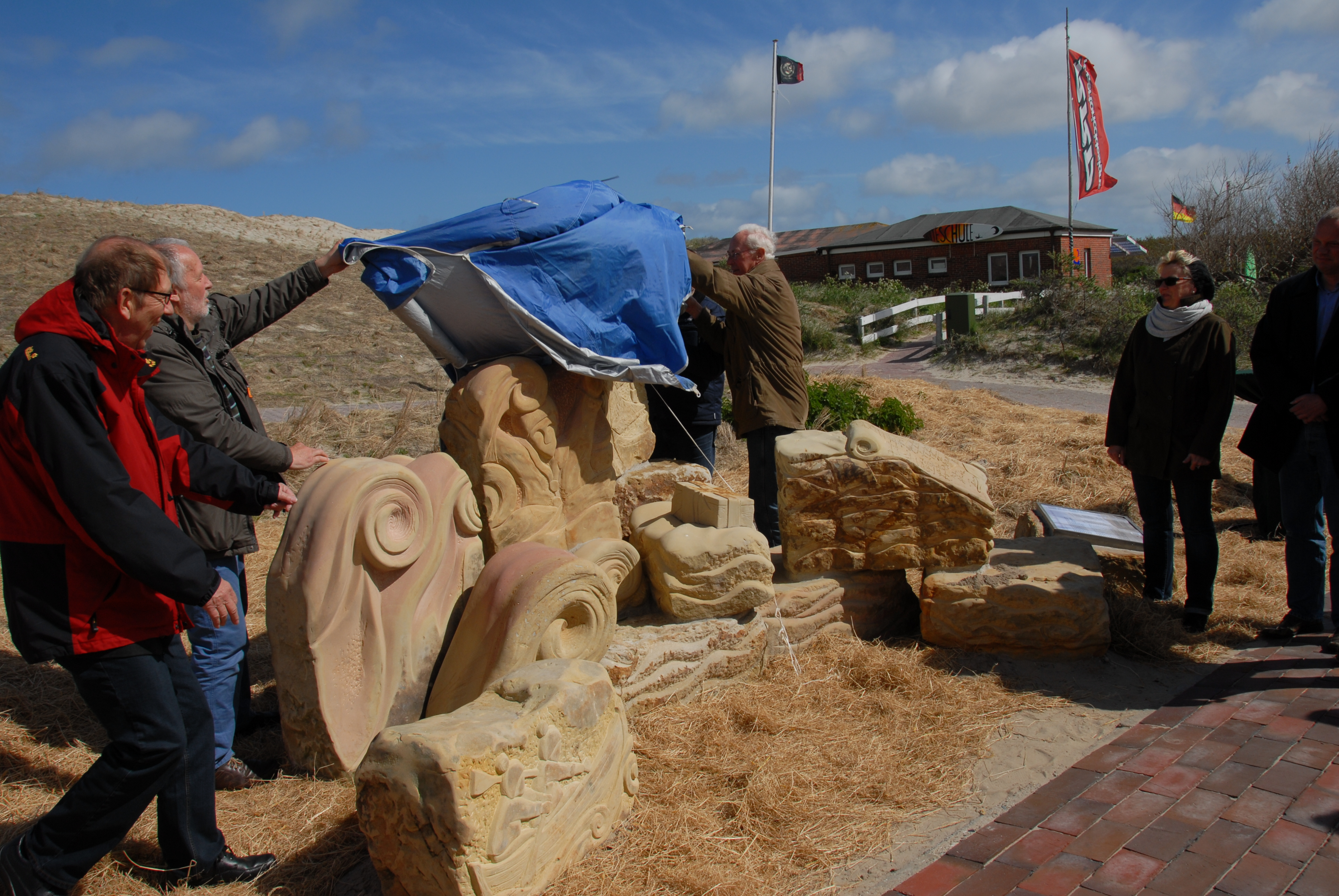
Unveiling of the Tjark Evers monument in 2015

The cigar box and its content were kept in the Evers family for several generations even when they moved to Esens on the mainland. Later, these memorabilia went to the local museum and were then displayed at the "Wattenmeerhaus" in Wilhelmshaven from 1998 to 2002. On 19 March 2002, Horst Evers gave the notebook and the box to a local heritage society in Baltrum where they were first shown in the "Nordseehaus" and from 2007 in the museum "Altes Zollhaus". On 13 May 2015, a monument of Tjark Evers was inaugurated in Baltrum. It was created by sculptor Bernd Clemenz-Weber.

In 2008 a short film titled Die Zigarrenkiste [The Cigar Box] was published by actor Matthias Klimsa. In 2013, authors Astrid Dehe and Achim Engstler adapted the death of Evers in their novelette Auflaufend Wasser [Rising Tide]. Earlier fictional literature was published in 1928 and 1935.

The medieval rock band Schandmaul published a song "Tjark Evers" on their 2016 album Leuchtfeuer. It was later covered by Versengold in Low German language.
