= Mit Leib und Seele (Schandmaul album) =

Studio album by Schandmaul
- Released: 31 March 2006
- Recorded: House of Audio Studios, Turnstyle Studio, Gröbenhell Studio
- Genre: Medieval metal
- Length: 68:44
- Language: German
- Label: Fame Recordings
- Producer: Thomas Heimann-Trosien

Schandmaul chronology
Wie Pech & Schwefel (2004)	Mit Leib und Seele (2006)	Anderswelt (2008)

Professional ratings
Review scores
Source	Rating
Sonic Seducer	favourable
Stormbringer	3.5/5 stars

Mit Leib und Seele is the fifth album released by Schandmaul on 31 March 2006. It remained in the German Longplay Charts for ten weeks, peaking at #10.

== Reviews ==
The Austrian webzine Stormbringer wrote a positive review, stating that although not overly innovative, the album was well-made and stirring with enough clearance given to the various instruments to unfold their character. The Sonic Seducer magazine of Germany called it the most diverse Schandmaul album so far and lauded the great range of sentiments on Mit Leib und Seele.

== Track listing ==
All music is composed by Schandmaul

No.	Title	Lyrics	Length
1.	"Vor der Schlacht"	Thomas Lindner	3:55
2.	"Lichtblick"	Thomas Lindner	3:23
3.	"Kein Weg zu weit"	Birgit Muggenthaler	4:05
4.	"Abschied"	Thomas Lindner	3:53
5.	"Feuertanz"	Thomas Lindner	5:04
6.	"Die Tür in mir"	Thomas Lindner	4:45
7.	"Das Mädchen und der Tod"		3:07
8.	"Der Untote"	Birgit Muggenthaler	4:36
9.	"Zauber der Nacht"	Anna Kränzlein	3:16
10.	"Mitgift"	Anna Kränzlein	3:33
11.	"Wolkenberge"	Anna Kränzlein	4:04
12.	"Dunkle Stunde"	Birgit Muggenthaler	4:39
13.	"Grosses Wasser"	Thomas Lindner	3:32
14.	"Der Poet"	Birgit Muggenthaler	3:51
15.	"Das Spiel"	Thomas Lindner	3:52
16.	"Käptn Coma"		3:31
17.	"Wie sie ist"	Anna Kränzlein	5:40

== Personnel ==
- Thomas Lindner – vocals, acoustic guitar, accordion
- Birgit Muggenthaler-Schmack – flutes, shawms, bagpipe, vocals
- Martin "Ducky" Duckstein – electric guitar, acoustic guitar, classical guitar, vocals
- Stefan Brunner – drums, percussion, vocals
- Matthias Richter – bass, upright bass
- Anna Kränzlein – violin, hurdy-gurdy, vocals
- Astrid Neagele – cello on 4, 8, 9, 17
