= Ougenweide =

Progressive rock band

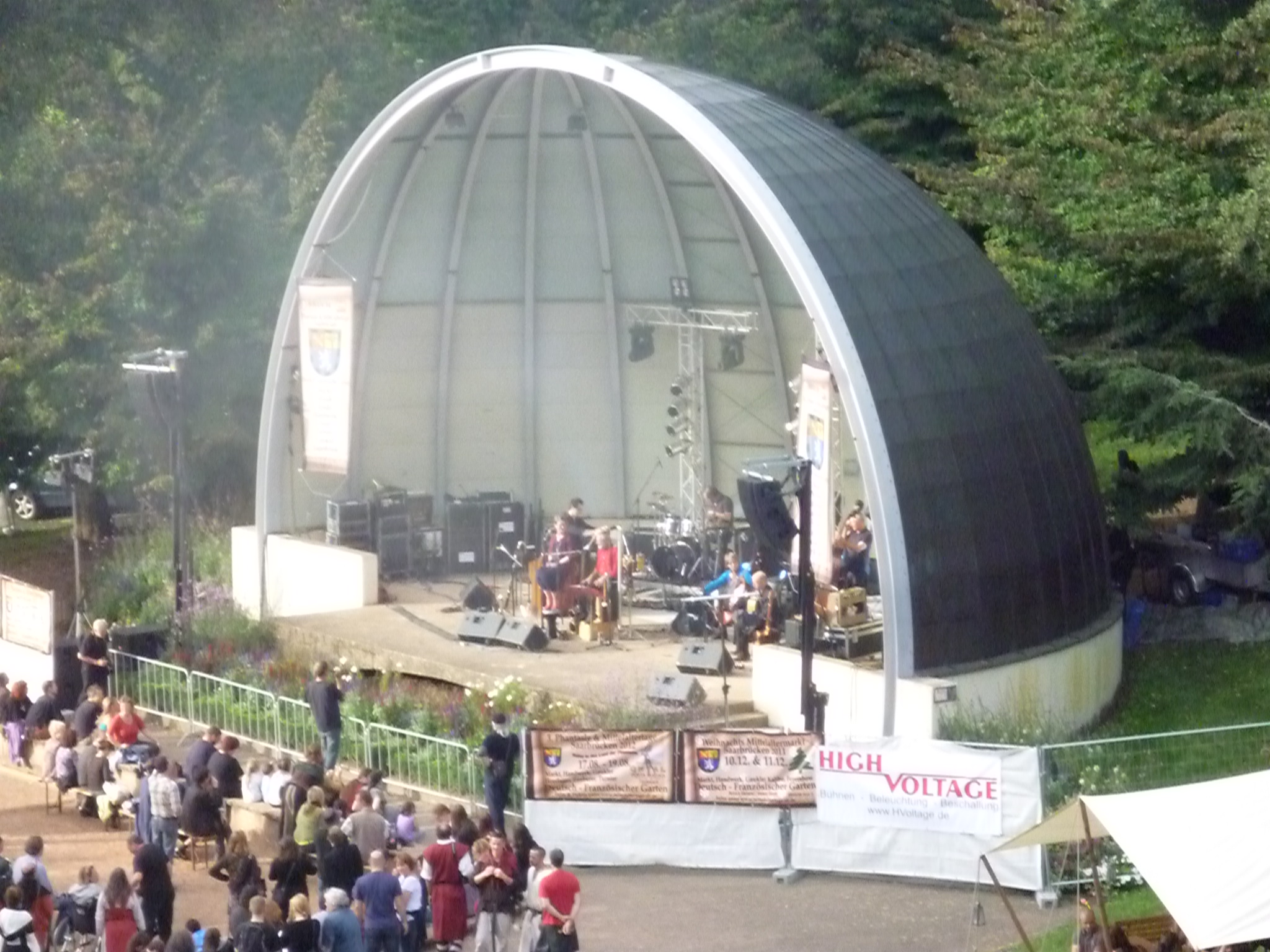
- Ougenweide live 2011

Background information
- Origin: Hamburg, Germany
- Genres: Medieval folk rock; progressive folk
- Years active: 1970–1985; 1996-1998; 2004; 2006-2011
- Website: http://www.oton-studio.com/

Ougenweide was a German folk rock band. They are notable for being pioneers of the medieval folk rock subgenre. The name comes from Middle High German ougenweide (Augenweide - feast for the eyes).

== Band history ==
=== The beginning ===
The predecessor band was formed in 1969; it was composed of Frank Wulff, Michael Steinbeck, Jürgen Isenbart, and Brigitte Blunck. Ougenweide was founded in spring 1970 in Hamburg as a folk rock band. The band is named after a song by Neidhart von Reuental, the first joint composition by Ougenweide. From the beginning the band wanted to set to music old poems and songs, but they never completely restricted themselves to the Medieval. The band was influenced by the Rock music scene of Hamburg of the 1960s.

=== Successful years ===
The second album of Ougenweide All die weil ich mag from 1974 used texts from the Merseburg Incantations. This sound recording of the Merseburger Zaubersprüche was covered later by many bands, including Die Irrlichter, who were awarded a prize in the 5th Falkensteiner Minnesangturnier by Ougenweide (who served as patrons and jury) in 2010, and by the medieval metal group In Extremo. The music is often incorrectly thought to originate in the Middle Ages, but goes back to Ougenweide. They also used texts or text-fragments by Walther von der Vogelweide, Heinrich von Mügeln and Johann Wolfgang Goethe. 1975 Ougenweide appeared on stage with Fairport Convention, Steeleye Span, Planxty, Amazing Blondel, Alan Stivell and Konstantin Wecker. They worked together with Peter Rühmkorf for a film about the life of Walther von der Vogelweide.

=== The split and reunions ===
After struggling with musical direction, Ougenweide gave their last performances early in 1985 before splitting up. Then, with the Tessera string quartet and the a cappella quintet Time Of Roses, they briefly reunited in 1996 to record "Sol", an album of covers of old European medieval folk songs. But after only giving sporadic performances, they split up again. The classic lineup reunited in 2004 to give a one-off hour performance and then the band reunited two years after with several new members afterwards. Frank Wulff stopped performing with the group in 2009 due to suffering from cancer, however he did record one more album with the group in 2010, Herzsprung, before dying prior to the album's release. The group briefly carried on without him but hasn't performed since 2011.

== Discography ==
=== Studio albums ===
- Ougenweide, 1973
- All die weil ich mag, 1974
- Ohrenschmaus, 1976
- Eulenspiegel, 1976
- Frÿheit, 1978
- Ousflug, 1979
- Ja-Markt, 1980
- Noch aber ist April, 1981
- Sol, 1996
- Herzsprung, 2010

=== Live albums ===
- Ungezwungen, 1977, 2007
- Wol mich der Stunde, 2004
- Ouwe war, 2005

=== Compilations ===
- Liederbuch Ougenweide, 1979, 1988
- Lieder aus 9 Jahrhunderten, 1983
- Ougenweide / All die weil ich mag, 2006
- Ohrenschmaus / Eulenspiegel, 2006
- Walther von der Vogelweide - Saget mir ieman: waz ist Minne?, 2007
- Frÿheit / Ousflug, 2007
- Ja-Markt / Noch aber ist April, 2007
