= Leuchtfeuer (album) =

Studio album by Schandmaul
- Released: 16 September 2016
- Genre: Folk rock
- Length: 47:19
- Label: Vertigo/Capitol
- Producer: Thomas Heimann-Trosien, Schandmaul

Schandmaul chronology
Unendlich (2014)	Leuchtfeuer (2016)	Artus (2019)

Leuchtfeuer is the ninth studio album by the German band folk rock band Schandmaul. It is Schandmaul's first record to reach the top position in the German charts.

Unlike previous Schandmaul releases, Leuchtfeuer contains less tracks with fictional medieval themes but focuses more on the biographies of real people. These include Joan of Arc ("Orléans"), robber Mathias Kneißl ("Schachermüller-Hiasl") and sailor Tjark Evers.

== Concept and development ==
The track about Tjark Evers was inspired by the East Frisian sailor of the same name who was erroneously released on an offshore shoal in thick fog instead of returning to his home island Baltrum. Knowing he would drown in the next flood, he put a farewell letter into a box of cigars which was later washed ashore to tell of his fate. Evers' body though was never found. According to lead singer Thomas Lindner, the motivation to write a song about Joan of Arc was to highlight a strong female personality. "Zu zweit allein" [Together alone] is a duet featuring Tarja Turunen. It was suggested by the record label. The feature film Räuber Kneißl by Marcus H. Rosenmüller about outlaw Mathias Kneißl who is regarded as a popular hero in parts of Bavaria inspired Lindner to write the track "Schachermüller-Hiasl". He thinks that Kneißl was neither a hero nor a Bavarian Robin Hood but just a "poor sod".

== Reception ==
Professional ratings
Review scores
Source	Rating
Metal Hammer Germany	4/7
Rock Hard	6.5/10

Metal Hammer Germany wrote that Schandmaul could still deliver their typical instrumental performances but the extended edition was found too slow and lasting. The reviewer for Rock Hard criticised that the album sounded too routinely and stereotypical while lacking Schandmaul's previous hardness and occasional dark mood.

== Track listing ==
All music is composed by Schandmaul, lyrics as stated below.

Standard edition
No.	Title	Lyrics	Length
1.	"Orléans"	Birgit Muggenthaler-Schmack	3:46
2.	"Heute bin ich König"	Muggenthaler-Schmack	3:42
3.	"Jack O'Lantern"	Thomas Lindner	2:33
4.	"Leuchtfeuer"	Martin Duckstein	3:45
5.	"Schachermüller-Hiasl"	Lindner	4:14
6.	"An deiner Seite"	Duckstein	3:23
7.	"Freunde"	Anna Katharina Kränzlein	4:01
8.	"Ich werd' alt"	Duckstein	3:05
9.	"Loreley"	Muggenthaler-Schmack	4:01
10.	"Herr der Wellen"	Duckstein	4:04
11.	"Tjark Evers"	Lindner	3:50
12.	"Zu zweit allein" (featuring Tarja Turunen)	Duckstein	3:39
13.	"Zeit"	Lindner	3:16
Total length:			47:19

Deluxe extended edition
No.	Title	Lyrics	Length
1.	"Orléans"	Birgit Muggenthaler-Schmack	3:46
2.	"Heute bin ich König"	Muggenthaler-Schmack	3:42
3.	"Jack O'Lantern"	Thomas Lindner	2:33
4.	"Sonnenseite"	Lindner, Thomas Heimann-Trosien	3:52
5.	"Leuchtfeuer"	Martin Duckstein	3:45
6.	"An deiner Seite"	Duckstein	3:23
7.	"Sommernachtstraum"	instrumental	3:27
8.	"Der Leiermann"	Anna Katharina Kränzlein	2:33
9.	"Loreley"	Muggenthaler-Schmack	4:01
10.	"Schachermüller-Hiasl"	Lindner	4:14
11.	"Freunde"	Kränzlein	4:01
12.	"Ich werd' alt"	Duckstein	3:05
13.	"Die schwarze Perle"	Lindner	4:05
14.	"Herr der Wellen"	Duckstein	4:04
15.	"Tjark Evers"	Lindner	3:50
16.	"Zu zweit allein" (featuring Tarja Turunen)	Duckstein	3:39
17.	"Zeit"	Lindner	3:16
Total length:			61:16

== Chart positions ==
Charts	Peak position
German Albums (Offizielle Top 100)	1
Austrian Albums (Ö3 Austria)	8
Swiss Albums (Schweizer Hitparade)	21
