= Deutsche Cannabis =

German private equity firm

Deutsche Cannabis AG is a private equity firm backing businesses engaged in cannabis-related ventures since 2014. It was created by the reverse takeover of F.A.M.E. AG, a Munich-based film and music production company. Shares are traded on the Frankfurt Stock Exchange.

== History ==
In 1999, in Munich, F.A.M.E. Film & Media Entertainment AG was founded as a company for "production, trading and rental of sound, film, Internet, video and music products and other audio-visual media products of all kinds". It served as a stock vehicle when Munich IMA Media GmbH took over in a 2000 merger. In the same year an IPO raised approximately 18.5 million DM in capital to be expended at the peak of the dotcom and "TMT" (technology, media and telecommunications) bubbles.

After its financial resources were invested into the production of films such as Das Phantom, Ratten – Sie werden dich kriegen! and Deathwatch, and producing music among other things by Schandmaul and Florian Ast, it had taken large losses, The Board of Directors and the Supervisory Board decided to dissolve the company in 2002. the F.A.M.E.-shares were listed in the "prison" section of the satirical stock exchange website nemwax (new market waste all share index) since 2001 because of the numerous profit warnings the company issued.

After completing the sale of its film and music production businesses, the company unnamed now at F.A.M.E. AG reoriented itself as a shell corporation for investment companies in the field of renewable energies. It briefly gave a loan to an insolvent district heating network operators in the Saarland and temporarily operated a solar facility in Collrunge (East Frisia). The headquarters moved to Berlin. In 2013, F.A.M.E. AG went bankrupt and applied for bankruptcy, but recovered a few months later after an unexpected payment.

After searching for a better business model, the owner of the company took the legalization of the possession and sale of marijuana in several U.S. states in 2014 as an opportunity to change the corporate purpose to participation with companies of the hemp industry. The company was renamed to Deutsche Cannabis AG and tried to raise new capital. In 2015, it began its involvement in its cannabis subsidiary ManhattanCannaFund LLC in Florida, and 2016 as first investment was a majority stake in the Hamburg startup company CannyPets GmbH, which would offer hemp-based pet food.

== See also ==
- Legal High (book), a 2016 political satire featuring a company called Cannabis GmbH
