= Deathwatch (2002 film) =

- Theatrical release poster
- Directed by: M. J. Bassett
- Written by: M. J. Bassett
- Produced by: Mike Downey; Frank Hübner; Sam Taylor
- Starring: Jamie Bell; Laurence Fox; Kris Marshall; Andy Serkis; Hugo Speer; Hugh O'Conor; Matthew Rhys
- Cinematography: Hubert Taczanowski
- Edited by: Anne Sopel
- Music by: Curt Cress; Chris Weller
- Production companies: ApolloMedia; Bavaria Film; Odyssey Entertainment; Portobello Pictures
- Distributed by: Pathé
- Release date: 6 December 2002
- Running time: 94 minutes
- Countries: United Kingdom; Germany
- Language: English
- Box office: $2.3 million

Deathwatch is a 2002 horror war film set during World War I, written and directed by M. J. Bassett, and starring Jamie Bell, Laurence Fox, Kris Marshall, Matthew Rhys and Andy Serkis. It follows a lost squad of British soldiers who take refuge in an enemy trench, only to discover it is haunted by a malevolent supernatural force.

== Plot ==
In 1917, soldiers of the British 5th Battalion's Y Company under Cpt. Jennings charge a German trench as part of a larger assault. The young Pvt. Charlie Shakespeare initially refuses, but is coaxed along by Sgt. Tate. Many soldiers fall to machine-gun fire or artillery and the unit becomes lost in the fog.

After walking for hours, carrying Pvt. Colin Chevasse, now paraplegic, the unit comes across a maze-like network of trenches. There they find three terrified Germans, who ignore Private Willie McNess's cries for surrender in apparent fear of something further down the trenches. Pvt. Thomas Quinn shoots and kills one, another flees, while the third, Friedrich, surrenders. Convinced they have broken through the enemy lines, the soldiers decide to secure the trenches. They explore and find ominous signs: rotting bodies with protruding barbed wire and German bayonets litter the ground. Compasses and watches also have stopped working. While detonating charges to close off some passages, they hear a demon-like growl and blood pours from the mud.

Later, Pvt. Jack Hawkstone is ambushed by the second German hiding in the mud. Jack and Pvt. Barry Starinski wound and subdue him, but Thomas executes him with a pistol and scalps him despite Tate's interference. Attempts to contact command via radio reveal Y Company was thought to have been obliterated during the assault before communications are lost.

Their first night in the trench starts uneventfully and Cpl. "Doc" Fairweather treats the wounded. Barry secludes himself but is distracted by strange sounds and finds three German corpses wrapped in barbed wire in a standing position. As he alerts the unit, one corpse suddenly comes to life and ambushes him. Charlie and Tate arrive to find Barry's corpse lashed to the wall with barbed wire. Suspecting that hidden German troops are responsible, the men violently interrogate Friedrich (who can also speak French, which Charlie understands). He explains that the other Germans turned on each other and that there is "evil" in the trenches.

The next morning, White Company piles up the German dead and clear the dugouts with grenades. Phantom sounds of incoming artillery and charging infantry cause Jennings to crack under the pressure, mistakenly shooting and killing Jack. Morale and discipline deteriorate, with Willie thinking of deserting. That night he is chased by an eerie red mist, hears voices, and is drenched in blood. Snapping, he flees into no man's land only to be shot by Pvt. Anthony Bradford. Doc attempts a rescue, but Willie, only able to crawl, is pursued by something tunneling in the mud that drags him under to his death. Meanwhile, Anthony, convinced that both he and the trenches are possessed by death, asks Charlie to shoot him so he will not kill anyone else. When the latter refuses, Anthony runs off.

In the morning, Thomas crucifies Friedrich alive on a wooden beam in no man's land and savagely beats him with a club. Jennings, now insane, orders an inspection, but Thomas instead subdues and stabs the officer to death. Tate attacks Thomas, but during the fight gets tangled in barbed wire and is killed by Thomas, who taunts Charlie when he refuses to shoot. Thomas is then ensnared and impaled by living strands of barbed wire that rise from the mud, forcing Charlie to kill him.

Freeing the crippled Friedrich, Charlie arms him with a rifle to defend himself before running off to find Doc. He finds Colin who, though pale and covered in flies, appears to be able to move his legs under the blankets. However, it is only the rats that have chewed off his legs, and Charlie tearfully euthanizes the boy. He then finds Anthony, who has tied Doc up with barbed wire and both men plead Charlie to kill Anthony. Again, Charlie refuses, and Anthony shoots Doc in the head. Shakespeare finally gives in and kills the chaplain, leaving him practically alone.

The soil under the German corpse pile starts to cave in, while living barbed wire blocks every passage, and Charlie is sucked down into the pit. He wakes up in a cave full of corpses, where living versions of his unit sit eating together like they were on the first night, including himself. He flees, reaching the trenches. Friedrich, now in perfect health, appears and points his rifle at him. Charlie, exasperated by the apparent betrayal, shouts in both English and French that he tried to help him. Friedrich calmly acknowledges this in English, saying he is free to go, pointing to a ladder leading up into no man's land before seemingly vanishing. Charlie climbs out of the trench and leaves to an unknown fate, disappearing into the fog.

Some time later, another team of British soldiers arrives at the trench. Seeing Friedrich sitting idly alone, they shout at him to surrender, to which he complies by lifting his hands. He then gives an ominous stare before the screen fades, implying that this will all happen again.

== Cast ==
- Jamie Bell as Private Charlie Shakespeare. Aged 16, he lied about his age to sign up, but is initially more cowardly than the other men.
- Ruaidhri Conroy as Private Colin Chevasse, who is left paraplegic by a spine injury and has to be cared for.
- Laurence Fox as Captain Bramwell Jennings, the unit's official commander, who is seen as out of his depth.
- Dean Lennox Kelly as Private Willie McNess, a Scotsman and the unit's point man.
- Torben Liebrecht as Friedrich, a German soldier taken prisoner by White Company.
- Kris Marshall as Private Barry Starinski, the unit's marksman.
- Hans Matheson as Private Jack Hawkstone. He carries a harmonica, playing it to lift morale.
- Hugh O'Conor as Private Anthony Bradford, the unit's chaplain and radio operator.
- Matthew Rhys as Corporal "Doc" Fairweather, the unit's medic.
- Andy Serkis as Private Thomas Quinn. He is brutal, remorseless, and comfortable with the violence of war.
- Hugo Speer as Sergeant David Tate. The squad XO, Tate is seen as more of a leader by the men than Jennings.
- Mike Downey as Captain Martin Plummer
- Pavel Tesar as Mudman (the second German)

== Production and release ==
The film was shot on location in Prague, Czech Republic, where extensive trench sets were constructed to recreate the Western Front. It premiered at the Toronto International Film Festival in 2002 before receiving a theatrical release in the United Kingdom by Pathé and in the United States by Artisan Entertainment.

Production credits include F.A.M.E. Film & Music Entertainment AG of Munich, which later became Deutsche Cannabis.

=== Home media ===
The film was released on DVD by Fox on 16 Jun 2003. It was re-released by Live/Artisan on 22 Jun 2004 and again by Pathe on 3 Oct 2005.

== Reception ==
On review aggregator website Rotten Tomatoes, Deathwatch received an approval rating of 25% based on 8 reviews, with an average rating of 4.6/10. Critics mostly praised the film's creative premise and atmosphere, but criticized its story execution and editing.

Alan Jones of The Radio Times rated the film one out of five stars, writing, "There's little to set the pulse racing, apart from some ghostly noises and a few gory effects, and Bassett's lumbering direction blasts any artistry, horror or suspense clean out of the target area." Allmovie gave the film a positive review calling it "a highly crafted atmospheric creep-out that knows when to go for the jugular and when to slather on the paranoia". TV Guide awarded the film 2.5/4 stars stating: "Bassett deserves half a salute for Twilight Zone-ish wallow in WWI misery, which works up some creepy atmosphere between scenes of dehumanizing combat. But the spook show element ultimately seems simultaneously ghoulish and hokey, and the pacifist moral is hammered home with blunt obviousness". Peter Bradshaw from The Guardian gave the film a mixed review, praising the film's premise and direction but panned the film's dull script. Nev Pierce from BBC awarded the film three out of five stars, while noting the film had its faults, Pierce called it "A creepy, authentically nasty little horror film".
