= Medieval metal =

Subgenre of folk metal music

- Other names: Mittelalter-metal
- Stylistic origins: Folk metal; medieval folk rock
- Cultural origins: Mid-1990s, Germany

Regional scenes
- Germany

Other topics
- Neo-Medieval music

Medieval metal is a subgenre of folk metal that blends heavy metal music with medieval folk music. Medieval metal is mostly restricted to Germany where it is known as Mittelalter-Metal or Mittelalter-Rock. The genre emerged from the middle of the 1990s with contributions from Subway to Sally, In Extremo and Schandmaul. The style is characterised by the prominent use of a wide variety of traditional folk and medieval instruments.

== History ==
=== Precursors ===
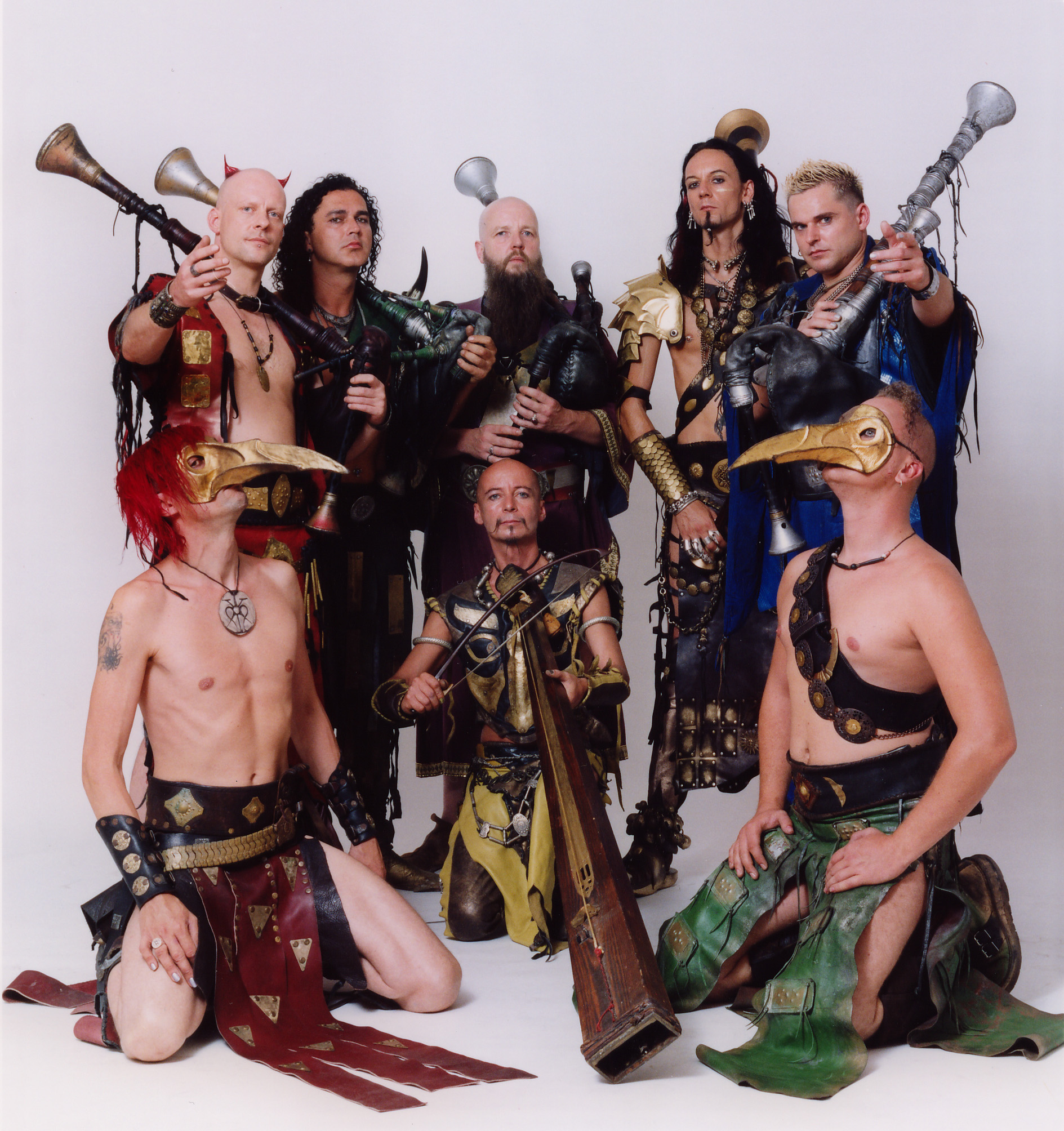
Corvus Corax

The medieval folk band Corvus Corax was formed in 1989 and released a debut album in the same year. The group relies on period instruments that include the cister, hurdy-gurdy, biniou, buccina, davul, riq and cornetto curvo with the most prominent being the shawm and bagpipes. They describe their approach as "louder, dirtier and more powerful than any interpretation of medieval music before." The result has been associated more with medieval taverns and pubs rather than the royal courts or church.

While medieval metal is a German phenomenon, one of the inspirations for the genre is the English folk metal band Skyclad. Formed in 1990 as a thrash metal band, they added violins from session musician Mike Evans on several tracks from their debut album, The Wayward Sons of Mother Earth, with the song "The Widdershins Jig" was acclaimed as "particularly significant" and "a certain first in the realms of Metal". The band added a full time violinist to their ranks and has since been credited not only as the originators and pioneers of folk metal but also as a direct inspiration for medieval metal bands.

=== Origins ===
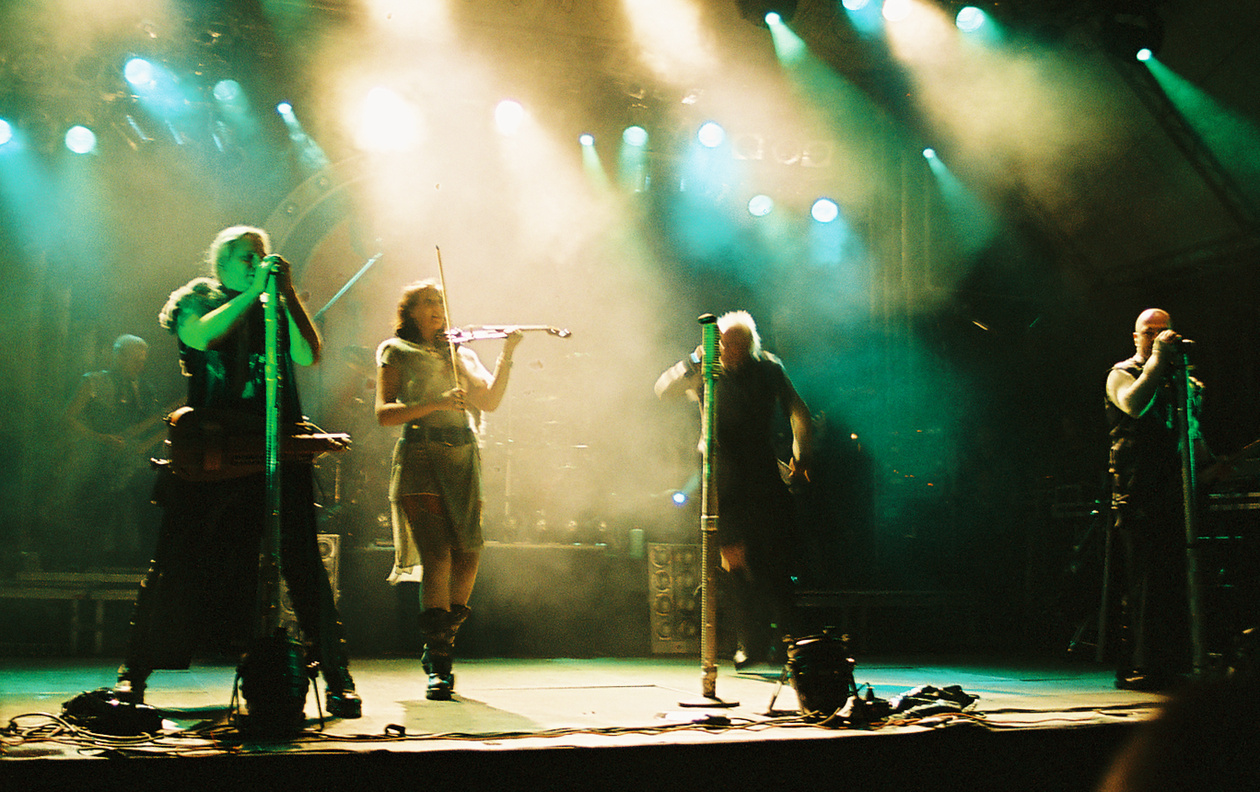
Subway to Sally, seen here performing live at the 2005 Sundstock Openair, has been credited as setting off this genre of music.

The East German band Subway to Sally was formed in 1992 as a folk rock band, singing in English and incorporating Irish and Scottish influences in their music. With their second album MCMXCV released in 1995, the band adopted a "more traditional approach" and started singing in German. Taking Skyclad as an influence, Subway to Sally performs a blend of hard rock and heavy metal music "enriched with medieval melodies enmeshed in the songs via bagpipes, hurdy-gurdy, lute, mandoline, shalm [sic], fiddle and flute" and combined with "romantic-symbolic German-speaking poetry" in their lyrics. With chart success in their native Germany, they have since been credited as the band "that set off the wave of what is known as medieval rock."

In the year 1994, a concert was organised in Berlin that featured a collaboration between a rock band known as Noah and members of the aforementioned medieval group Corvus Corax. The result of this mix of medieval and rock music saw the group Noah turning into In Extremo. They began with two acoustic medieval albums before releasing a metal album Weckt die Toten! in 1998. They have since found chart success in Germany with their "medieval style stage garb and unashamed usage of such bizarre instruments as the Scottish bagpipes."

Corvus Corax also joined in the fray with the release of an EP in 1996 that featured metal music with bagpipes. The EP was titled Tanzwut and the group has since continued exploring medieval metal as a side project by that name. Their style blends not only medieval music and heavy metal but also industrial and electronic beats.

The year 1999 also saw the release of Schandmaul's debut album. Describing themselves as the "minstrels of today," the Bavarian outfit employs a musical arsenal that includes the bagpipes, hurdy-gurdy, shawm, violin and mandolin. Like Subway to Sally and In Extremo, Schandmaul has experienced chart success in their native Germany. Other groups that also emerged during the late 1990s and early 2000s included Letzte Instanz, Morgenstern, Saltatio Mortis and Schattentantz.

=== 21st century ===
Bands have found continued success throughout the 21st century. In 2005, In Extremo's Mein rasend Herz ranked number three in Germany. Their next album Sängerkrieg (2008) achieved the top spot on the German charts. Schandmaul's Unendlich (2014) reached number two on the German charts and was later certified gold in Germany. Other groups such as Feuerschwanz and Folkstone continued to emerge as older groups achieved more mainstream success.

== Musical characteristics ==
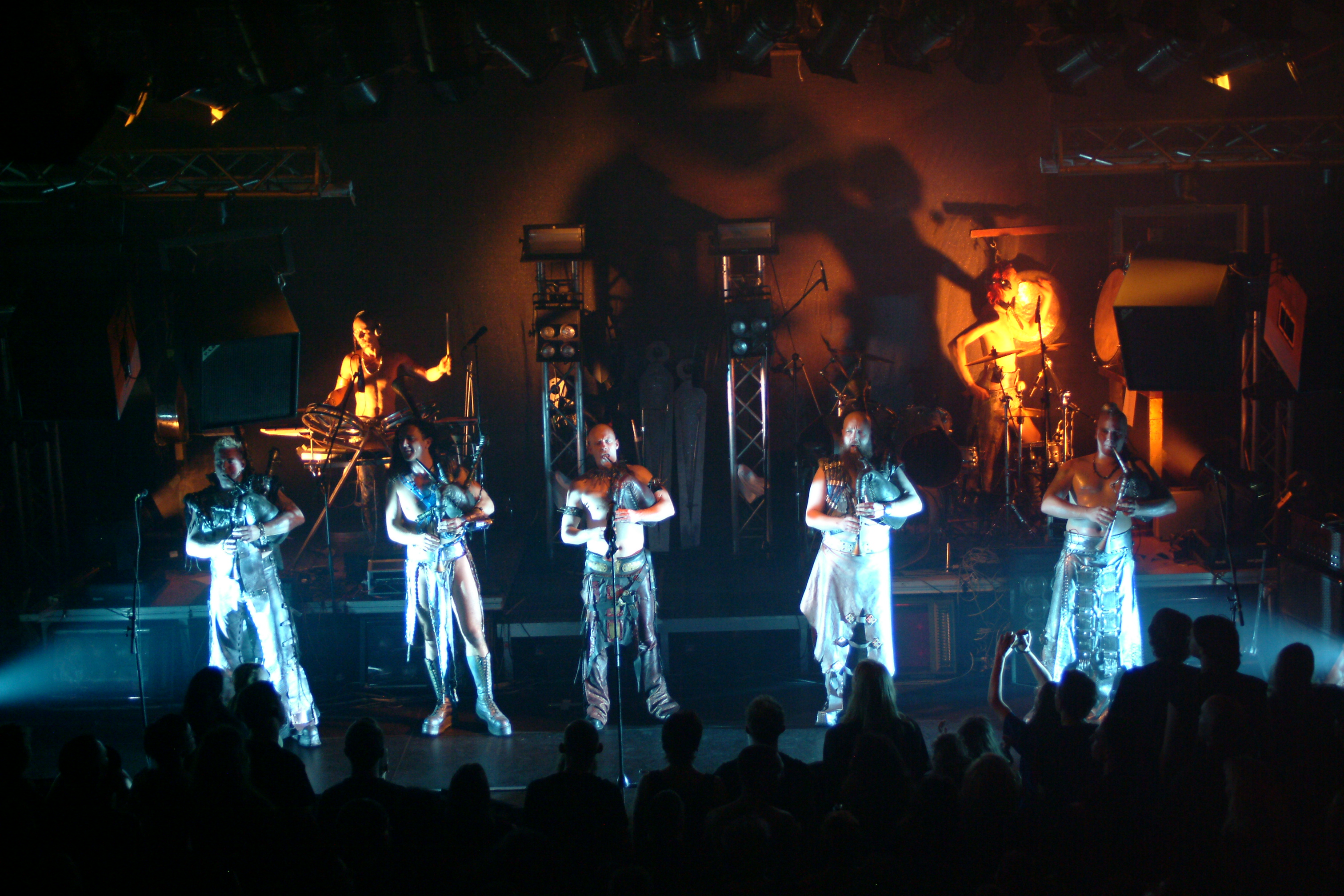
Tanzwut performing with bagpipes and other woodwind instruments

Like its parent genre, medieval rock features the same typical instruments found in heavy metal music: guitars, bass, drums and vocalist. Bands in the genre are known to supplement their sound with a wide range of folk and traditional instruments. Woodwind instruments like the bagpipes, flutes and shawm can be found in the music of Corvus Corax, Tanzwut, In Extremo, Schandmaul, Morgernstern, Schattentantz and Subway to Sally while string instruments like the violin, lute, hurdy-gurdy, cello, harp and mandolin are employed by Subway to Sally, In Extremo, Schandmaul, Morgenstern, and Schattentantz. Many bands also dress in stylized medieval era costumes on stage.

Bands adopt musical styles from many medieval era source material. Corvus Corax pulls from many styles such as viking music, celtic music, nordic music, as well as from fantasy stories such as Lord of the Rings. Their 2005 album Cantus Buranus was written using the text from Carmina Burana. To contrast, other bands take a more modern approach to their songwriting while still including traditional medieval or ancient instruments.

== See also ==
- Folk metal
- Medieval folk rock
- Pagan metal
- Viking Metal
- Pirate Metal
