= Unendlich (Schandmaul album) =

Studio album by Schandmaul
- Released: 24 January 2014
- Genre: Folk rock, folk metal
- Label: Universal

Schandmaul chronology
Traumtänzer (2011)	Unendlich (2014)	Leuchtfeuer (2016)

Unendlich is the eighth studio album by the German band Schandmaul. Combining instruments like uileann pipes and fiddles with electric guitars, it focuses on the band's roots in folk rock. It is Schandmaul's first release on the Universal label.

The album contains references to historical events like the Battle of Trafalgar as well as a homage to Wolfgang Hohlbein's Magic Moon (German: Märchenmond).

== Reception ==
Professional ratings
Review scores
Source	Rating
Metal Hammer Germany	5/7
Rock Hard	7.0/10

Metal Hammer Germany observed that on this release Schandmaul had returned to being "bards" that tell stories of folklore. The track "Märchenmond" was reviewed as close to progressive rock, while the instrumental tracks were generally called "average". The Sonic Seducer noted the various folk instruments used for the recordings and the diverse musical styles like bossa nova ("Tangossa"), Irish folk ("Little Miss Midleton") and epic guitar rock. The reviewer for Rock Hard wrote that although the production was flawless, the album did not reflect the band's full potential and should have contained more hard rock tracks.

The album peaked at position two in the German Media Control Charts while the single "Euch zum Geleit" reached position 85. It was nominated for the 2014 ECHO award. In 2015, Unendlich was certified gold status in Germany for 100,000 sold copies.

== Track listing ==
No.	Title	Writer(s)	Length
1.	"Trafalgar"	Thomas Lindner	3:38
2.	"Tippelbruder"	Lindner	3:09
3.	"Kaspar"	Lindner	3:11
4.	"In Deinem Namen"	Birgit Muggenthaler-Schmack	4:41
5.	"Bunt und nicht braun"	Martin Duckstein	3:42
6.	"Mit der Flut"	Lindner	2:49
7.	"Baum des Lebens"	Muggenthaler-Schmack	3:45
8.	"Tangossa"	Lindner	3:54
9.	"Euch zum Geleit"	Duckstein	4:09
10.	"Saphira"	Lindner	4:31
11.	"Mittsommer"	Muggenthaler-Schmack	4:17
12.	"Little Miss Midleton"	Lindner	2:49
13.	"Der Teufel..."	Lindner	2:40
14.	"Mein Bildnis"	Muggenthaler-Schmack	4:02
15.	"Märchenmond"	Lindner	6:47

== Charts ==
Charts	Peak position
German Albums (Offizielle Top 100)	2
Austrian Albums (Ö3 Austria)	6
Swiss Albums (Schweizer Hitparade)	23
