= Schandmaul =

German medieval folk rock band

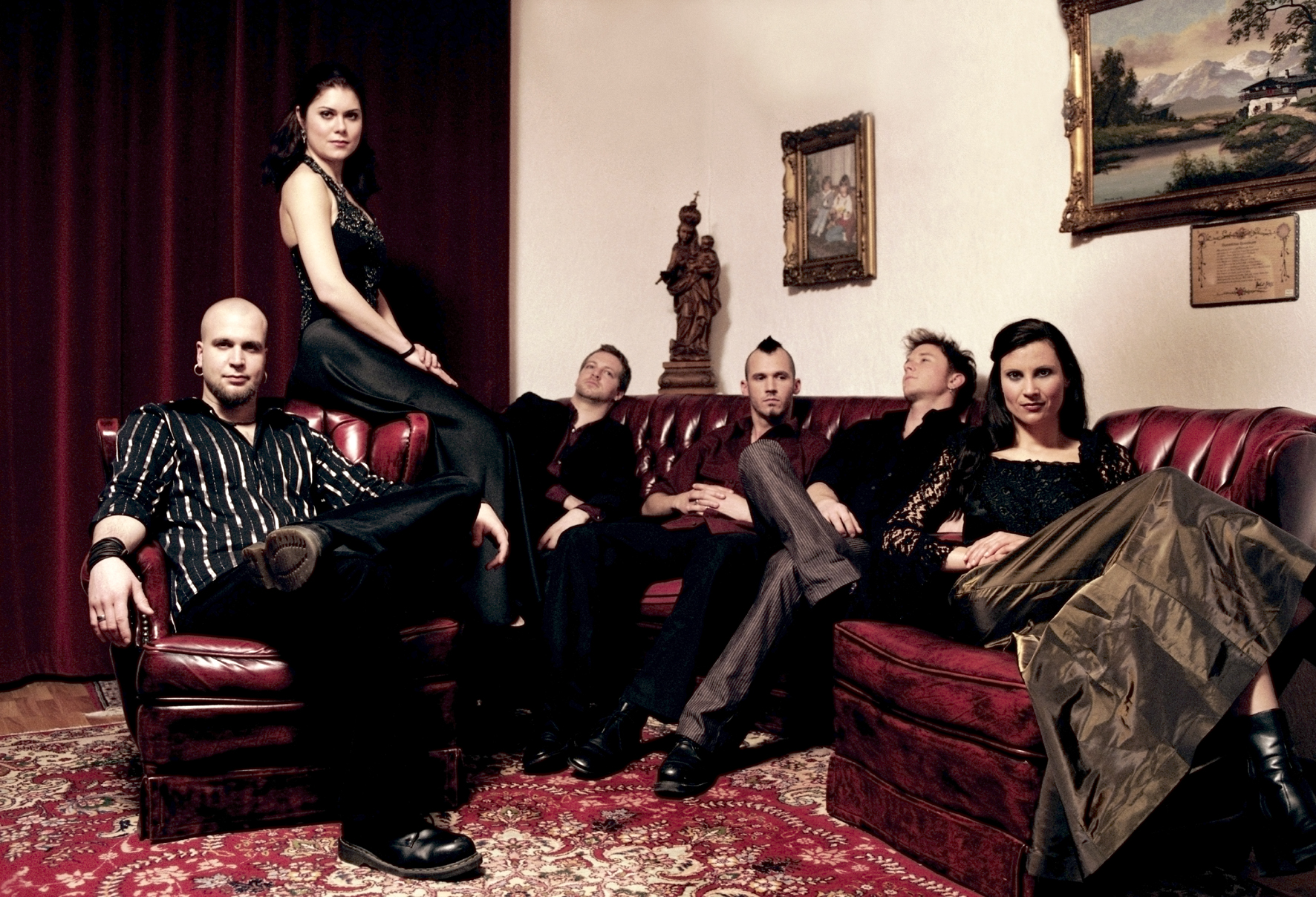
- The Schandmaul founding members. Left to right: Lindner, Kränzlein, Duckstein, Richter, Brunner, Muggenthaler-Schmack.

Background information
- Origin: Munich, Germany
- Genre: Medieval folk rock
- Years active: 1998–present
- Labels: Fame Recordings, Universal, Napalm Records
- Members: Thomas Lindner; Birgit Muggenthaler-Schmack; Martin Christoph Duckstein; Stefan Brunner; Matthias Richter; Saskia Forkert
- Past members: Hubsi Widmann; Anna Kränzlein
- Website: schandmaul.de

Schandmaul is a German medieval folk rock band from the Munich area.

As well as using modern instruments such as the bass and electric guitar, the band also utilizes instruments typically used in Medieval folk songs such as the bagpipes, hurdy-gurdy, or shawm to produce their trademark folk rock sound. Schandmaul was nominated two times for the Echo Music Prize and has so far had six albums in the top ten German album charts and three top-ten albums in Austria.

The name 'Schandmaul' translates roughly to 'malicious tongue' or 'backbiter' and refers to their mascot of a grinning skeletal jester.

== History ==
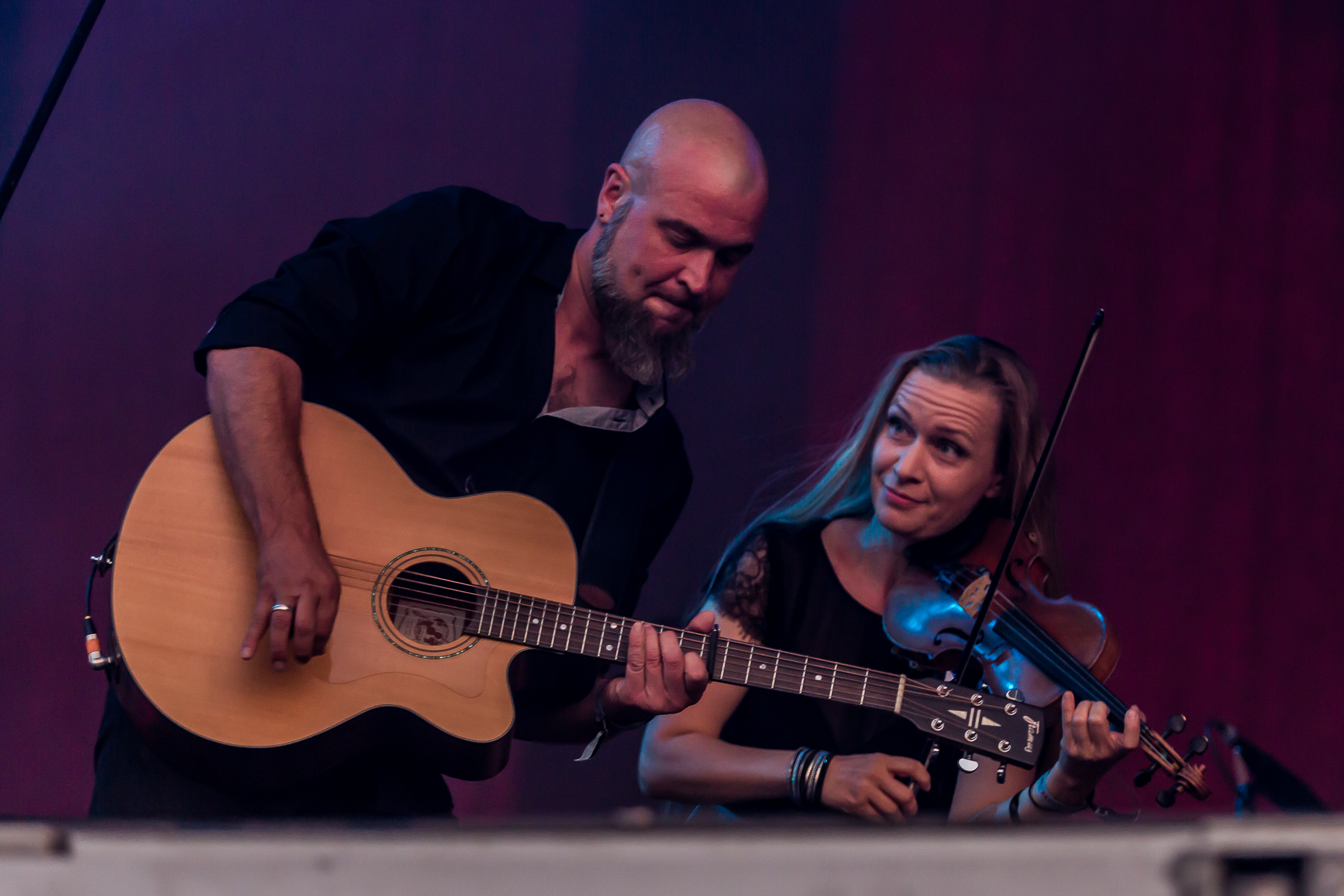
Singer Thomas Lindner and guest musician Ally Storch at Rockharz 2018

Schandmaul was founded in the summer of 1998 when six musicians from Munich and the surrounding area, then members of different bands, came together for a folk rock concert. They were dissatisfied with performing nothing but cover-versions and so decided to write a few songs of their own for the event. The very first song written by the newly formed band, Teufelsweib (lit. Devil-Woman), already exhibited the sound that, cultivated and developed over the years, is considered typical for Schandmaul.

The first concert took place in the bar 'Die Hexe' (lit. 'The Witch') in Gröbenzell. The self-deprecating name 'Schandmaul' was chosen to be used by the band at the event, inspired by a jester from a deck of cards. The jester is viewed as a fool, but this indignity gains him the privilege to speak his mind freely, and accordingly, the outdated swear word 'Schandmaul' refers to somebody who frequently says things considered rude or outrageous.

The success of the concert spawned their desire to produce a CD, which was to be the self-produced album Wahre Helden (lit. True Heroes).

Their abundance of creative energy inspired more songs and a second album, titled Von Spitzbuben und anderen Halunken (lit. Of Rogues and Other Scoundrels), was released in 2000. That same year, the band signed with concert promoter Extratours, who has been responsible for the band's live shows ever since.

In 2001, record label F.A.M.E. recordings took notice of the band, leading to the re-release of Von Spitzbuben und anderen Halunken. Simultaneously, through numerous shows including big festivals like M'era Luna, the Zillo Festival and Wave-Gotik-Treffen, the first big tour came about. The third CD, Narrenkönig (lit. King of the Jester's) was recorded in a professional studio and was released in October 2002, reaching No. 70 on the charts. In September 2002, the band parted ways with bassist Hubsi Widman, who was replaced by Matthias Richter who debuted on 22 September 2002 in Meschede.

In 2003 the first live CD and DVD, Hexenkessel (lit. Witch's Cauldron, also meaning the proverbial 'boiling pot') were released, recorded during a concert in the Munich club New Backstage, at which Michael Rhein from In Extremo made a cameo appearance as guest singer. Hexenkessel reached No. 52 in the charts.

In early 2004, Wie Pech & Schwefel (lit. Like Pitch and Sulphur, German idiom with a similar meaning to "as thick as thieves") appeared in the stores. This first studio album with Matthias Richter reached No. 13 in the charts. A tour with over 80 concerts and shows throughout German-speaking Europe followed. At the end of 2004, the band organized the first ever Funkenflug festival in Munich. The following year, the biggest project yet in the band's history was created: An acoustic tour, where the electric guitars were replaced by a string quartet and extra percussion, capped off by a huge concert in Munich's Circus Krone Building, accompanied by the Puchheimer Jugendkammerorchester (a 50 piece orchestra) and helped out by numerous musicians from other bands, such as Castus and Wim from Corvus Corax on bag pipes and Oliver s. Tyr from Faun on the Celtic harp (who had recently teamed up with Birgit to create a folk project called Sava). This huge show was recorded and released as both a CD and DVD under the name "Kunststück" (lit. Feat). The CD reached No. 12 in the album charts and the DVD made it to No. 3 in the video charts having sold 25,000 copies as of 2011. A single called "Bin Unterwegs" (lit. "(I) Am on the way") was also produced based on the live recording from Circus Krone. More shows followed, partially with the strings but including the rock set, and a cooperation-agreement with the Deutschen Zentrum für Musiktherapie (German Centre for Music Therapy) was created.

In March 2006 another album appeared, titled Mit Leib und Seele (lit. Body and Soul). This became the first Schandmaul album to reach the top ten of Germany's Media Control charts.

Schandmaul's sixth album Anderswelt (lit. meaning "Other-world") appeared in April 2008. It reached a position of No. 8 in Media Control's album charts in its first week and remained in their Top 100 for fifteen weeks. This success has since been topped by their 2011 album, Traumtänzer.

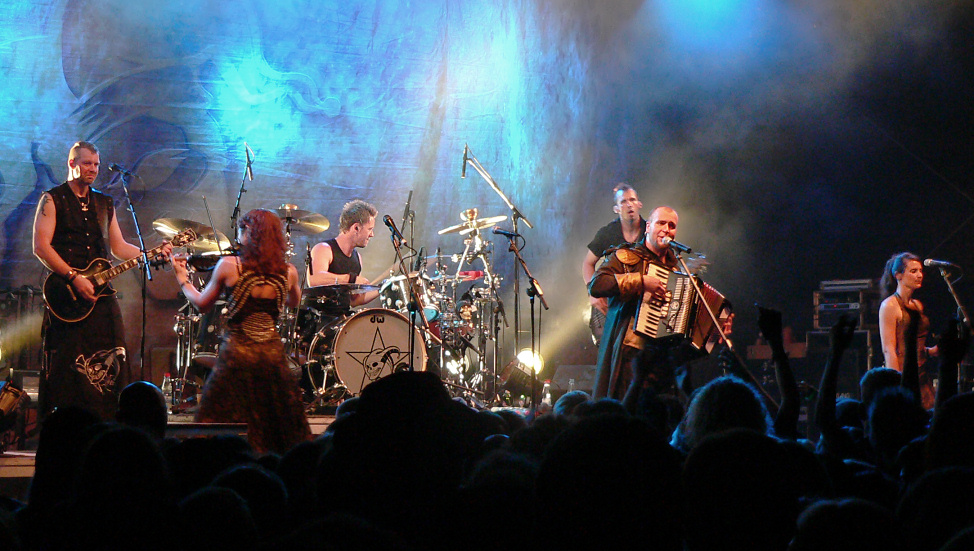
Schandmaul performing in 2009

In November 2008, Schandmaul celebrated their 10th anniversary with a widely promoted anniversary concert in Munich that was filmed and recorded for the live CD and DVD Sinnfonie (word play on the words Sinn, sense, and Sinfonie, symphony).

In early 2009, Schandmaul were nominated for the German music award ECHO.

A club tour that was originally planned for 2010 was cancelled and no concerts were played that year as the band wanted a break to write new material.

This album, Traumtänzer (lit. dream dancer), was released on 28 January 2011 and was followed by a short spring tour and appearances at festivals in the summer of 2011. The album reached a position of No. 4 in the German Media Control album charts

The eighth studio album Unendlich (lit. infinite) was released on 24 January 2014 by Universal Records. Unendlich peaked at position 2 in the German charts, making it the most successful Schandmaul album yet. It was nominated for the 2014 ECHO award. Unendlich was certified gold status in Germany for 100,000 sold copies.

The album LeuchtFeuer (lit. light beacons or navigational light) was released on 16 September 2016. It entered the German album charts a week later and was immediately listed at position No. 1. It is Schandmaul's first album to reach the top position in the charts. The band was accompanied by Tarja Turunen on the track Zu zweit allein.

On 2 September 2020 they signed a record deal with Napalm Records.

== Discography ==
=== Studio albums ===
Year	Title	Peak positions			Certifications
Year	Title	GER	AUT	SWI	Certifications
1999	Wahre Helden [True Heroes]	—	—	—	
2000	Von Spitzbuben und anderen Halunken [Of Rogues and Other Scoundrels]	—	—	—	
2002	Narrenkönig [King of Jesters]	70	—	—	
2004	Wie Pech & Schwefel ["Thick as Thieves" - lit. Like Pitch & Sulfur, German proverb]	13	—	—	
2006	Mit Leib und Seele [With Body and Soul]	10	62	99	
2008	Anderswelt [Other-world]	8	43	44	
2011	Traumtänzer [Dream dancer]	4	10	36	
2014	Unendlich [Infinite]	2	6	23	GER: Gold
2016	Leuchtfeuer [Light beacons]	1	8	21	
2019	Artus	2	11	20	
2022	Knüppel aus dem Sack	5	29	35	
2026	Sternensegler	2	5	—	

=== Live albums ===
Year	Title	Peak positions
Year	Title	GER
2003	Hexenkessel [Witch's Cauldron]	52
2005	Kunststück [Feat with a double meaning of Piece of art]	12
2009	Sinnfonie [word play on the words Sinn, sense, and Sinfonie, symphony]	12

=== Compilations ===
Year	Title	Peak positions	
Year	Title	GER	AUT
2006	Picture Vinyl, vinyl record	—	—
2013	So weit, so gut 1998–2013 [So far, so good]	7	61

=== EPs ===
Year	Title	Peak positions
Year	Title	GER
2005	Bin Unterwegs [(I) Am on My Way]	59
2006	Kein Weg zu weit [No Way (Is) Too Far]	—
2014	Euch zum Geleit [A Foreword for You]	85

=== DVDs ===
- Hexenkessel (2003)
- Kunststück (2005), certified gold status in 2011 for 25,000 sold copies
- Sinnbilder (2008)
- Sinnfonie (2009)

== Awards and nominations ==
Year	Nominee / work	Award	Result
2000	Schandmaul	German Folk Music Sponsorship Award (Deutscher Folkförderpreis)	Won
2007	Schandmaul's own project for the promotion of upcoming bands	Pick Up Bavarian Rock Prize (Bayerischer Rockpreis Pick Up)	Won
2009	Anderswelt	ECHO	Nominated
2014	Unendlich	ECHO	Nominated

== Members ==
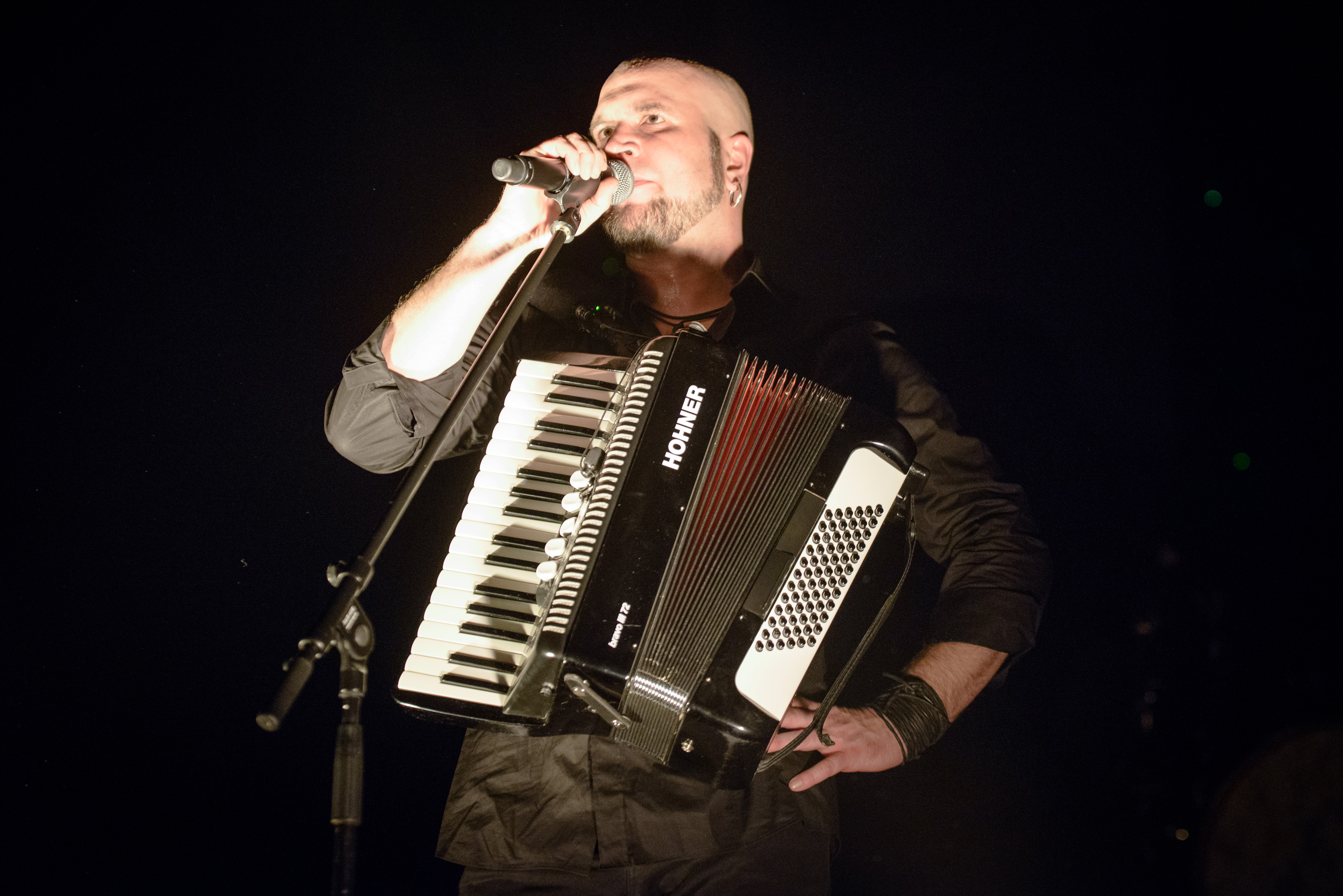
Thomas Lindner in 2014

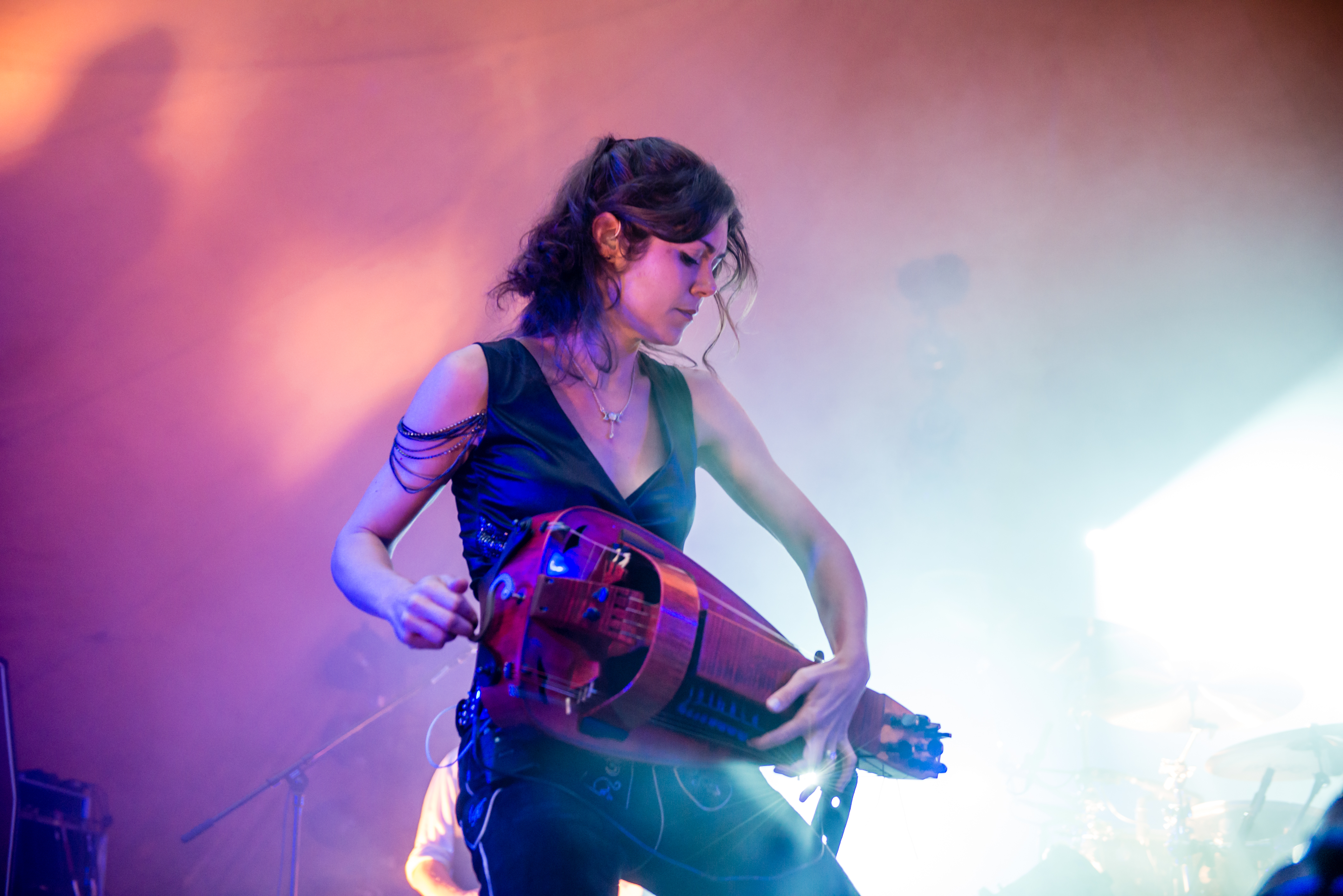
Anna Katharina Kränzlein in 2015

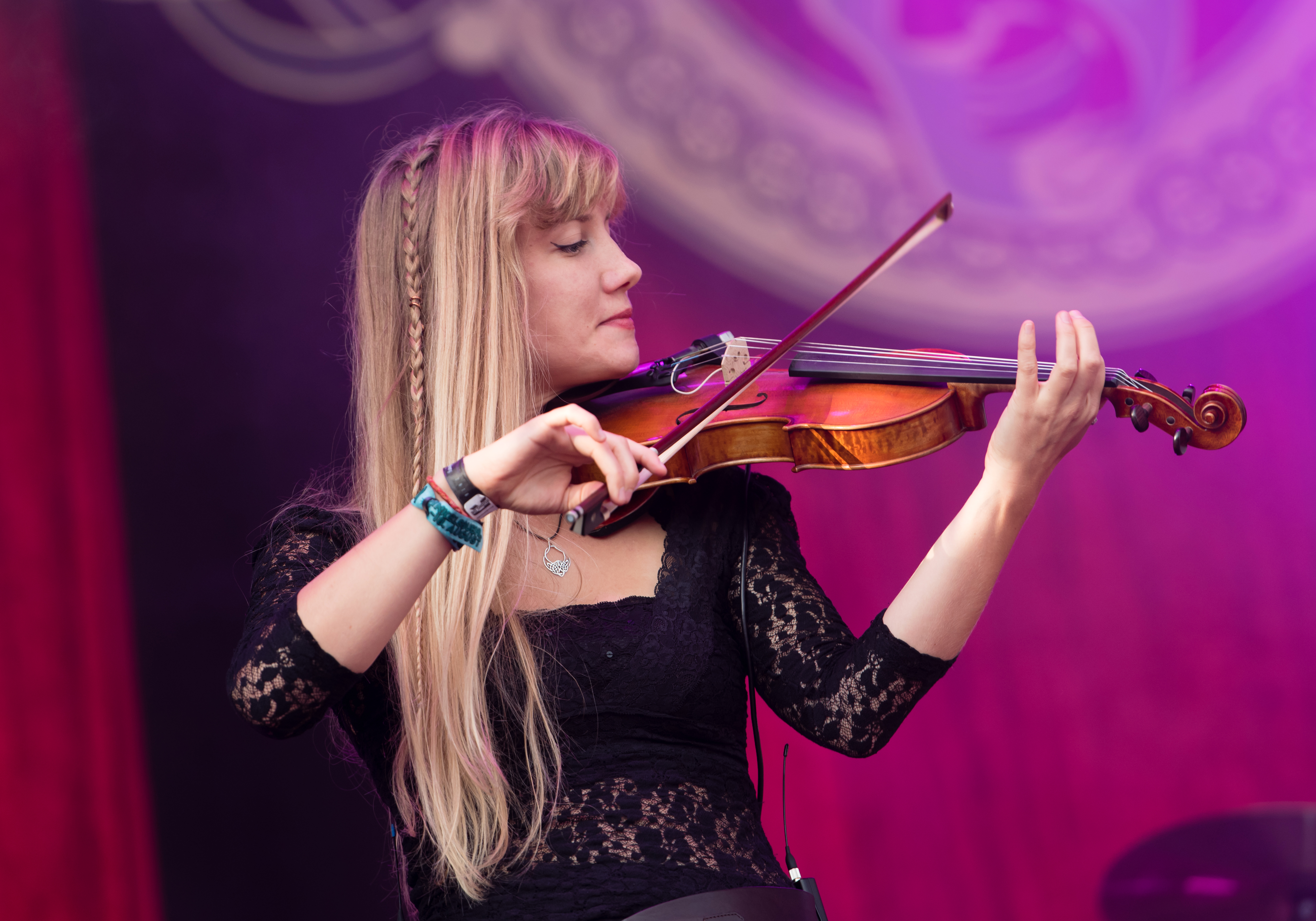
Saskia Forkert in 2018

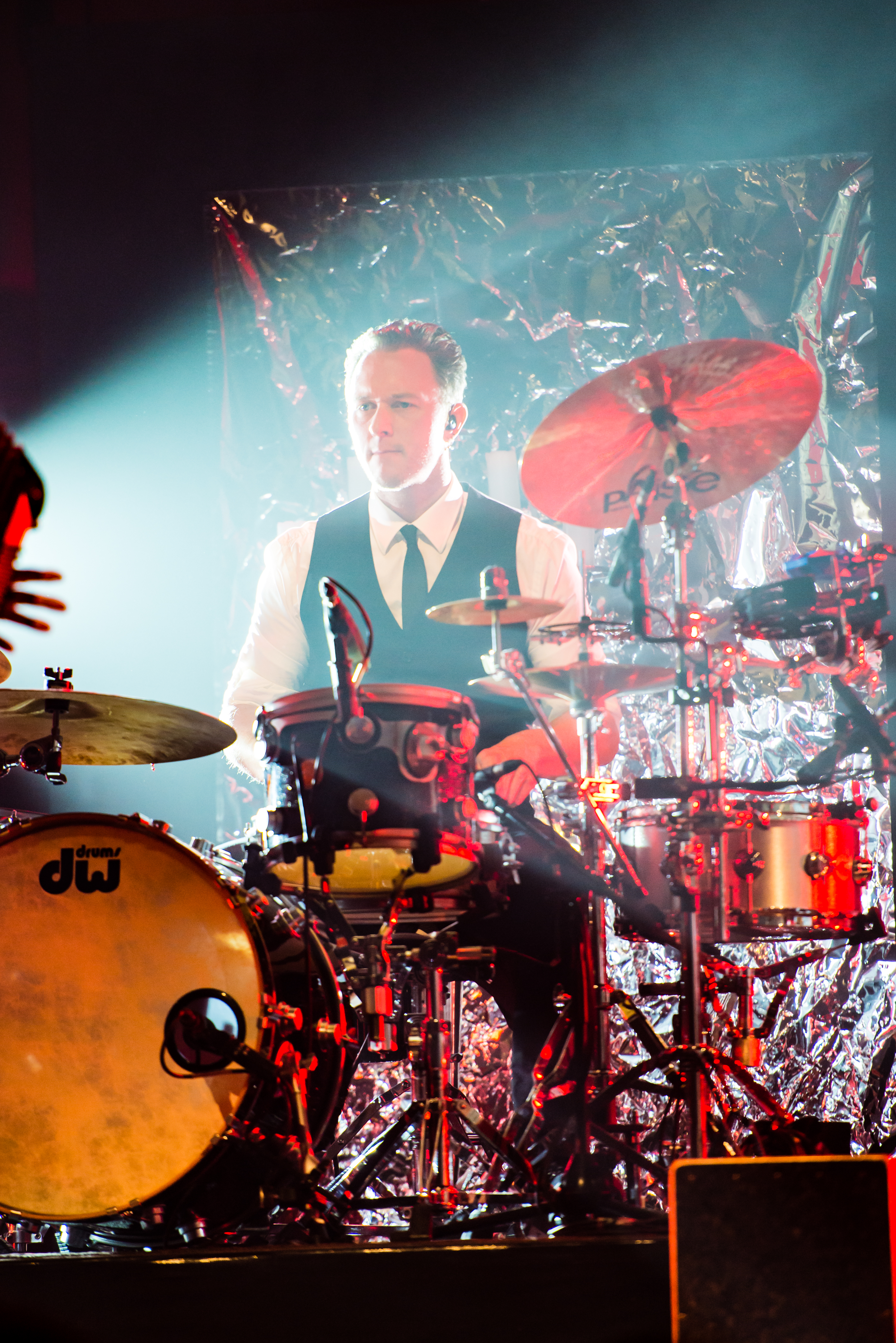
Stefan Brunner in 2015

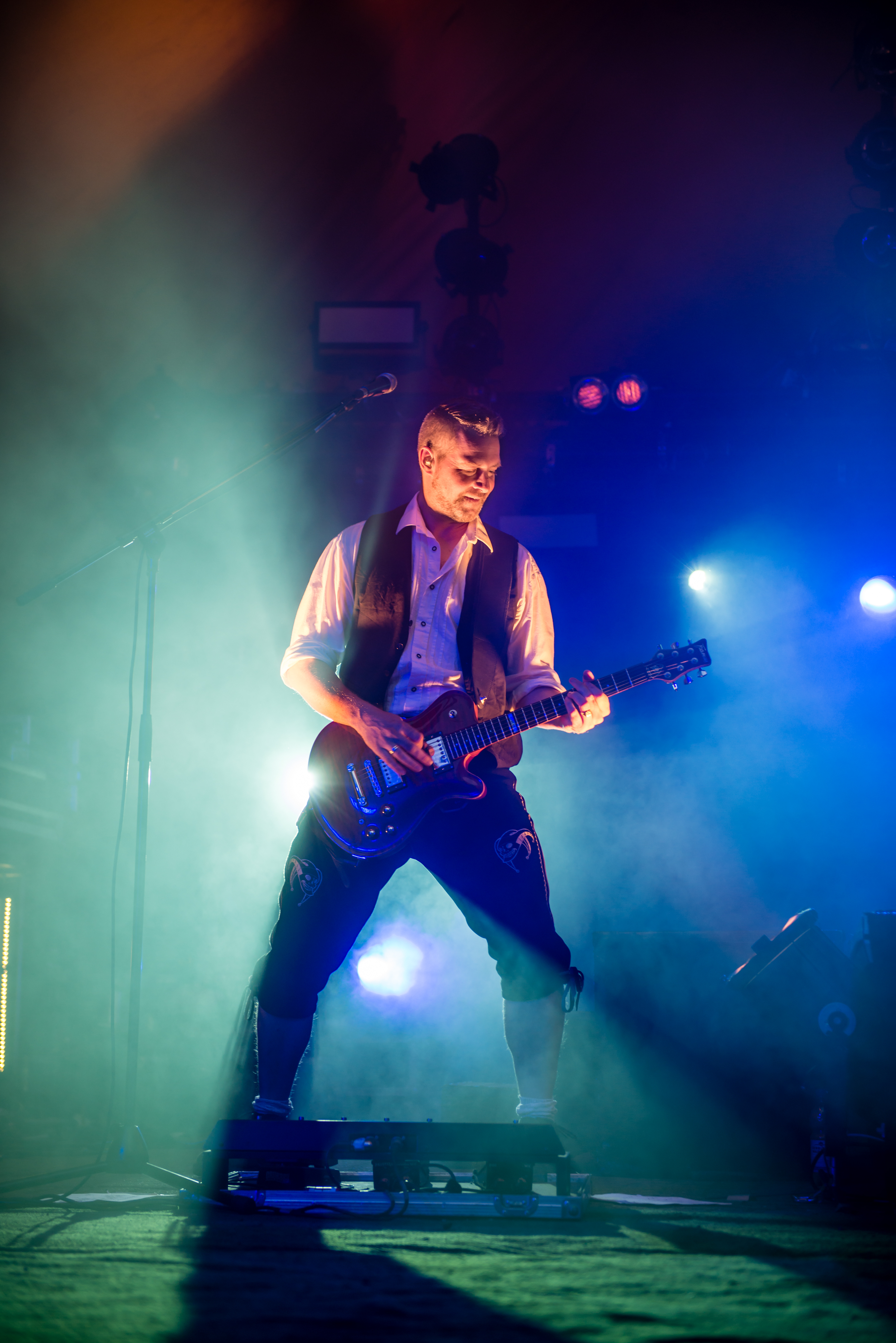
Martin Christoph Ducky Duckstein in 2015

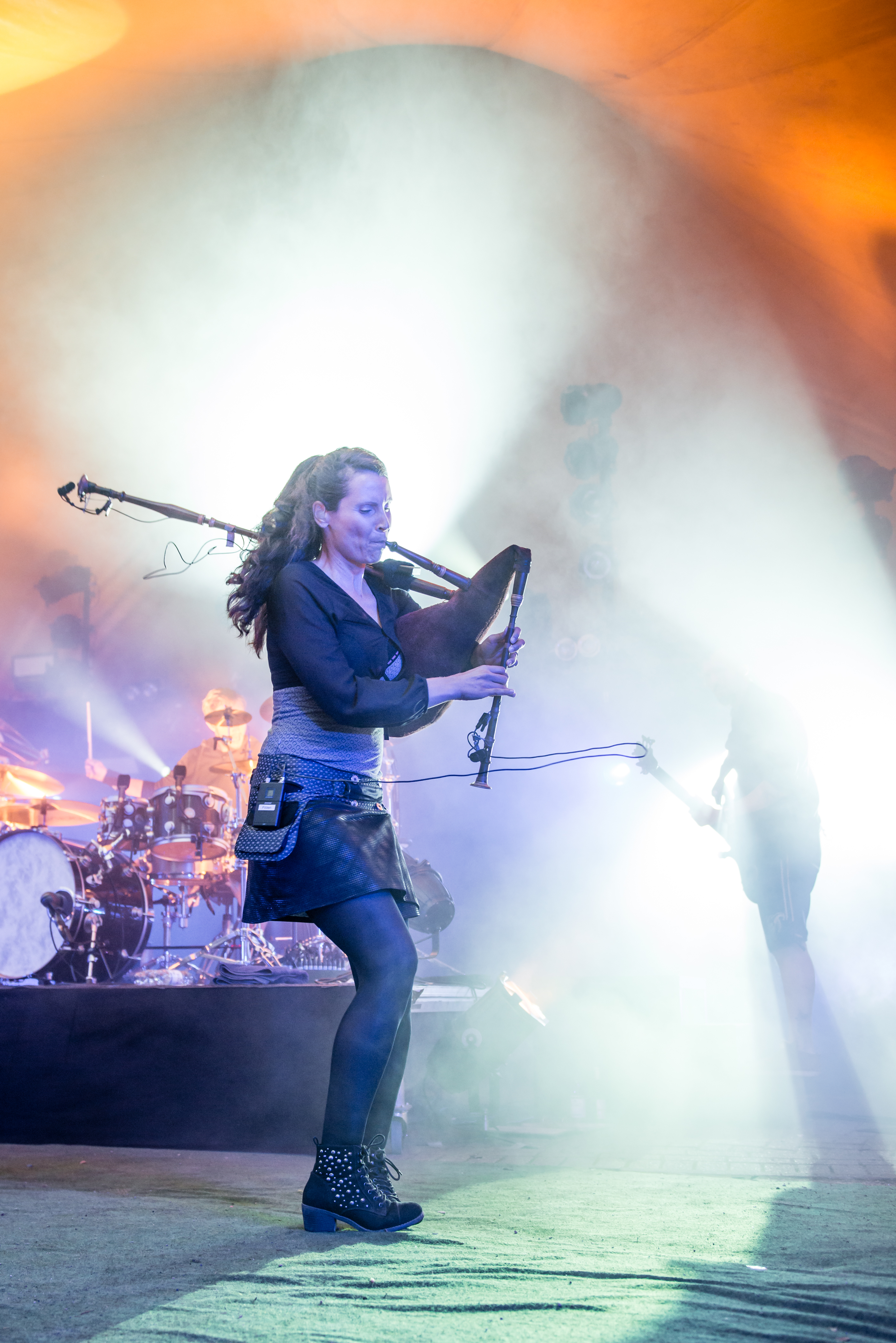
Birgit Muggenthaler-Schmack in 2015

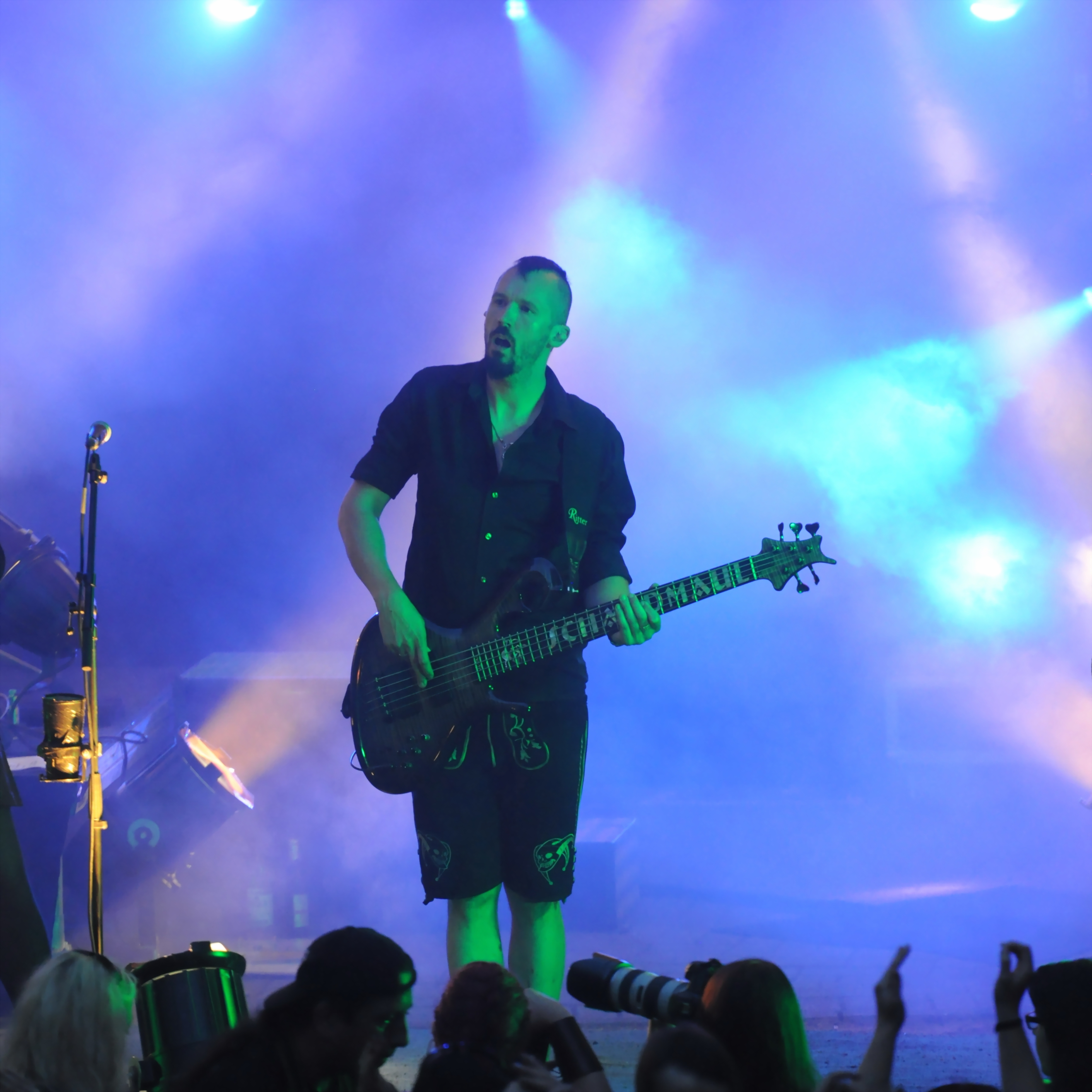
Matthias Hiasl Richter in 2015

=== Current members ===
- Thomas Lindner – vocals, acoustic guitar, accordion
- Birgit Muggenthaler-Schmack – flute, shawms, bagpipes, vocals
- Martin "Ducky" Duckstein – guitars, acoustic guitar, classical guitar, vocals
- Stefan Brunner – drums, percussion, vocals
- Matthias Richter – bass, upright bass (since 2002)
- Saskia Forkert – violin, hurdy-gurdy, backing vocals (since 2018)

The four male band members also play in the rock band Weto with Regicide keyboardist Heiner Jaspers, while Birgit Muggenthaler-Schmack and Anna Kränzlein both cultivate their own side projects, Sava and Anna Katharina, respectively.

=== Former members ===
- Hubsi Widmann – bass, mandolin, hurdy-gurdy, vocals (1998–2002)
- Anna Kränzlein – violin, hurdy-gurdy, vocals (1998–2017)
