= Medieval folk rock =

Music genre

- Stylistic origins: Rock music, folk rock, British folk rock, early music, progressive folk
- Cultural origins: Mid 1960s – early 1970s England
- Typical instruments: Electric guitar, bass, percussion, woodwinds, strings, bagpipes, shawm, tromba marina, hurdy-gurdy, and other Medieval instruments, vocals
- Derivative forms: Neo-Medieval music

Subgenres
- Medieval metal

Regional scenes
- England, Germany, Brittany

Medieval folk rock, medieval rock or medieval folk is a musical subgenre that emerged in the early 1970s in England and Germany which combined elements of early music with rock music. It grew out of the British folk rock and progressive folk movements of the late 1960s. Despite the name, the term was used indiscriminately to categorise performers who incorporated elements of medieval, renaissance and baroque music into their work and sometimes to describe groups who used few, or no, electric instruments. This subgenre reached its height towards the middle of the 1970s when it achieved some mainstream success in Britain, but within a few years most groups had either disbanded, or were absorbed into the wider movements of progressive folk and progressive rock. Nevertheless, the genre had a considerable impact within progressive rock where early music, and medievalism in general, was a major influence and through that in the development of heavy metal. More recently medieval folk rock has revived in popularity along with other forms of medieval inspired music such as Dark Wave orientated neo-Medieval music and medieval metal.

== Characteristics ==
Medieval folk rock is characterised by three major elements used in various combinations. First, the playing of extant early music involving rock instrumentation. Second, the creation of original music that incorporates compositional features of early music, such as use of musical modes beyond those now considered major and minor keys. Third, the incorporation of the sounds of early music into rock songs, through vocal techniques, the use of additional instruments that characterise early music, or the simulation of early music sounds on rock instruments (for example, the use of a drone sound on an electric guitar). A final element that does not affect the nature of the music, but often accompanies it, is the adoption of perceived elements of 'medievalism' in lyrics, actions, dress or artwork.

== History ==
=== Origins (1960s) ===
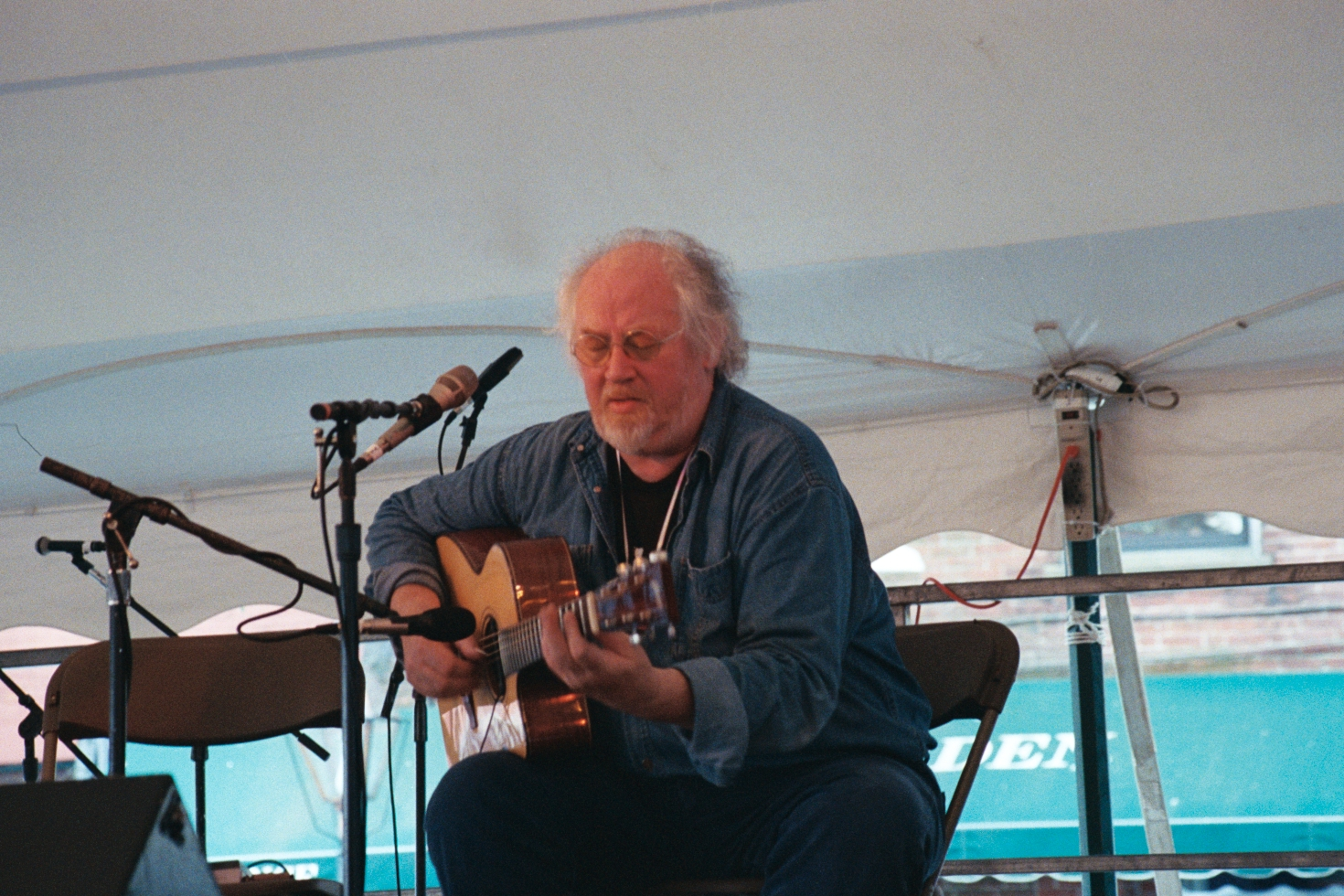
John Renbourn in 2005

Musicologists have noted an attempt to fuse popular music with elements of early classical music from the mid-1960s in Britain and America, which they refer to as baroque rock or baroque pop. An interest in fusing the sounds of medieval and renaissance music with more popular forms was first evident in the British progressive folk movement of the late 1960s. This was particularly clear in the important work of The Incredible String Band from their 1967 album The 5000 Spirits or the Layers of the Onion (1967), which introduced both medieval and world music elements into their music. These continued in the highly influential The Hangman's Beautiful Daughter (1968).

Also part of the progressive folk movement was guitarist John Renbourn, whose 1968 album Sir John Alot of Merry Englandes Musyk Thynge and ye Grene Knyghte began to display his interest in the medieval, containing a number of versions of early music songs, which would be dominant on The Lady and the Unicorn (1970). From 1967 Renbourn was a member of the folk group Pentangle, and he took his interest in early music into the mix of influences (including blues, jazz, bluegrass, world music and traditional folk song) in the band. Coming from the more traditional end of the folk spectrum were Shirley and Dolly Collins. They were the first artists to produce a complete album, Anthems in Eden (1969), that combined traditional folk songs with early music instruments, utilizing David Munrow's Early Music Consort, and early music remained a major preoccupation of their careers. Also from 1969 Third Ear Band made use of medieval instruments alongside classical and eastern influences.

What laid the foundation for the transformation of these trends into a form of rock music was the release in 1969 of the London-based folk rock band Fairport Convention's album Liege and Lief, which saw the clear inception of British folk rock as fusion between electric rock music and traditional folk songs and styles. Fairport Convention occasionally incorporated elements of early music into their repertoire. However, their fusion of English folk music with rock instrumentation was mostly focused on early modern and nineteenth-century ballads and dance music. In contrast, the band formed by former Fairport member Ashley Hutchings as Steeleye Span in 1969, tended to explore a wider range of period music ranging back into the Middle Ages. They also utilized more diverse instruments, including mandolins, recorders and oboes, besides electric guitars, bass and later, drums. This was exemplified by their 1972 album Below the Salt, which contained several early music songs and from which they released the a cappella single of the sixteenth-century carol "Gaudete", which reached number fourteen in the UK singles chart, arguably the greatest mainstream success for medieval folk rock, as the band were occasionally described.

=== Heyday: 1970-75 ===
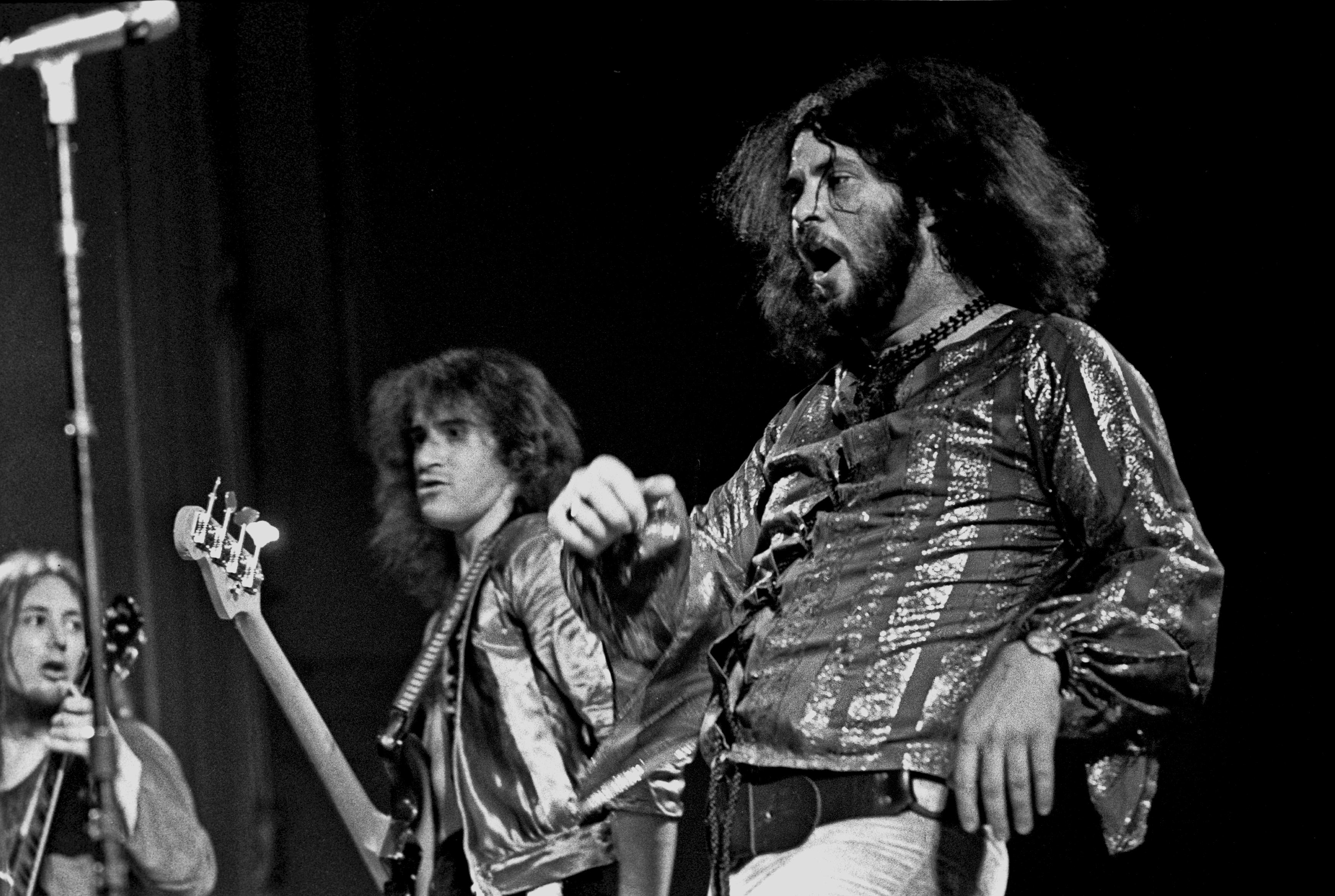
Gentle Giant in 1974

The process of 'electrification' set off by Fairport in the folk world, by which existing groups adopted a model of rock instrumentation, meant that several progressive folk performers of early music now joined a growing number of medieval folk rock bands. These included Pentangle, who electrified in 1970 for the album Cruel Sister, Third Ear Band, who from 1972 introduced electric guitars, basses and drums and, from 1976, with the release of Amaranth, Dolly Collins produced an early music album for her sister Shirley that used both electric and traditional instruments.

In contrast to Pentangle, Amazing Blondel, formed in 1969 and who composed their own music in a renaissance style, did not electrify. Nevertheless, because of their approach and use of original compositions, they are often described as medieval rock. Very similar in tone were bands like Forest, who from 1969 recorded their own compositions with modern acoustic and medieval instruments.

At the same time in Germany there were similar developments. Because of the association of folk music with Nazism, Ougenweide, originally formed in 1970 as an acoustic folk group, although inspired by Fairport Convention and Pentangle, opted to draw exclusively on High German medieval music when they electrified, setting the agenda for future German folk rock. Several bands followed suit, including Parzival from 1971.

The growth of interest in early music in the academic and classical worlds was significant for the expansion of medieval folk rock. Gryphon, arguably the archetypal British band in the genre, was formed in 1971 by Richard Harvey and Brian Gulland, both graduates of the Royal Academy of Music. Gryphon were originally an acoustic ensemble performing folk and medieval tunes. However, with the addition of guitarist Graeme Taylor and drummer Dave Oberlé, by the time of their first eponymously titled album in 1973 they had become a folk rock band that incorporated bassoons and krumhorns into their sound and were being marketed as 'medieval rock'. The same year saw other experiments that combined early music with rock instruments, including the one-off project Giles Farnaby's Dream Band.

Often classified with Gryphon were Gentle Giant whose multi-instrumental members added clavichord, harpsichord, violin and recorder to the mix from their second album Acquiring the Taste (1971), but this was all combined with classical and jazz elements and can be already considered as progressive rock. In 1971, the year that Gryphon and Gentle Giant were founded, medieval music was one of the prevailing fashions in rock music, as evidenced by probably the most successful band of the moment Led Zeppelin in their amalgamation of blues-based rock with recorders and mandolins together with medieval themes on Led Zeppelin IV, most notably on 'Stairway to Heaven'.

=== Decline and diffusion 1976-80 ===
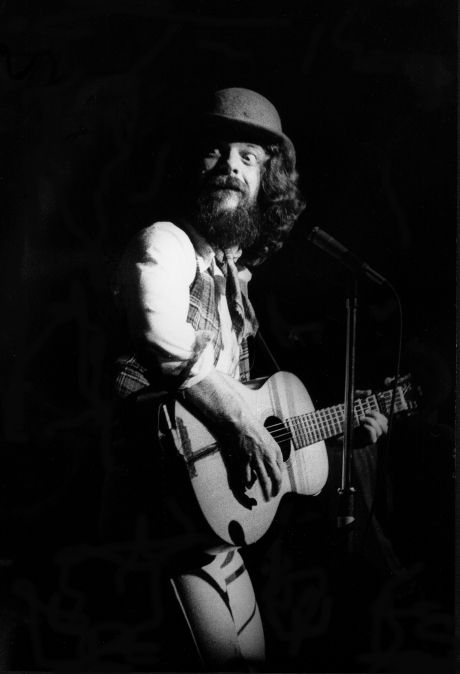
Ian Anderson of Jethro Tull at London's Hammersmith Odeon, March 1978

The first half of the 1970s was a short-lived peak in popularity for medieval folk rock. Gryphon enjoyed some mainstream success when they played the National theatre and Old Vic and supported Yes on tour. However, with line-up changes from about 1975 they began to drop their distinctive medieval sound and became increasingly a mainstream progressive rock band, before they dissolved in 1977. Similarly despite retaining elements of medieval music, bands like Gentle Giant rapidly moved off into further experimentation and were soon being classified under the more general category of progressive rock.

The only places where medieval folk rock was growing in the late 1970s were France and the Netherlands. In France, particularly from Brittany, there were bands like Ripaille, formed for a highly regarded eponymous album in 1977, and Saga de Ragnar Lodbrock in 1979. In the same period the most enduring French folk rock band Tri Yann also moved into medieval territory. There were also a handful of bands in other European countries, including Thomas Flinter from the Netherlands from 1978 to 1980. However, although starting later most of these groups had disbanded or moved on at the start of the 1980s.

If surviving medieval folk rock bands shifted towards more mainstream progressive rock, progressive rock bands often included early music among their influences. Despite emerging from the British blues boom, the vocal style of Ian Anderson of Jethro Tull was often compared with a medieval troubadour's, while the signature sound of his flute, later combined with the keyboard and stringed instrumental skills of the band, lent itself to a medieval element of the music. This emerged most clearly with the album Minstrel in the Gallery (1975) and later in the folk inspired Songs from the Wood (1977). Medieval images and sounds are so prominent in the band's career that they have occasionally been classified as 'medieval progressive rock'. Yes took occasional flights into medievalism, perhaps because of their highly talented keyboard player Rick Wakeman, who in 1975 produced the rock opera album The Myths and Legends of King Arthur and the Knights of the Round Table.

It is argued that progressive rock obtained its distinctive sound of modal harmony from medieval music. It was probably through progressive rock that early music influences found their way into early heavy metal, for example in the modal keys employed by Black Sabbath from 1970 and in the Renaissance inspired songs of bands like the Ritchie Blackmore founded Rainbow from 1974.

However, early music was only one of a range of influences on these bands, including classical, jazz and world music, from which progressive groups selected and adapted. As the popularity of progressive rock declined in the face of punk rock, new wave and electronic rock in the second half of the 1970s, early music tended to disappear as a major musical influence in rock, and while medieval and fantasy themes remained a feature of developing genre of heavy metal, there was little conscious attempt to replicate early music.

=== Renaissance: 1980s to the present ===
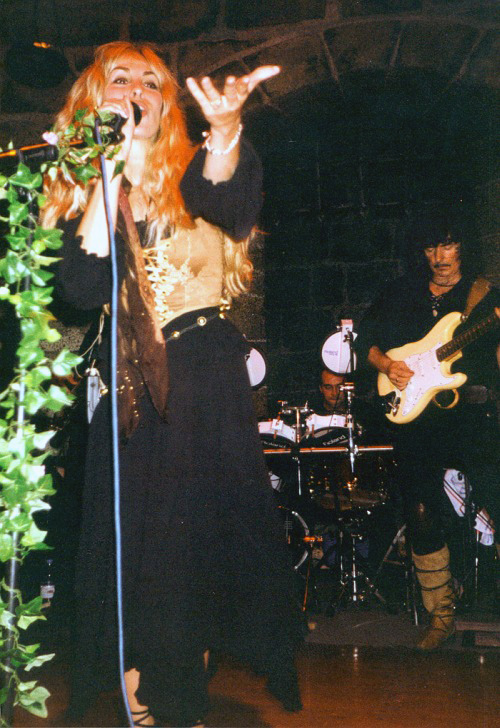
Blackmore's Night performing in Heidelberg 2002

Medieval folk rock virtually disappeared in the early 1980s. Some rock performers did continue to produce medieval style music, particularly groups emerging from the German electronic Kosmische movement, including Estampie, who from 1985 sang lyrics in medieval German and Latin, and members of which went on to found Qntal in 1991. Neither of these bands used guitars and both avoided the 'medieval rock' label. They are often associated with the neo-Medieval music of Dark Wave goth subculture that flourished in the 1980s, producing acts including the Australian duo Dead Can Dance and from America Faith and the Muse. This genre is extremely difficult to classify, but is usually characterised by reliance on electronic music and (particularly female) voices mixed with medieval acoustic instruments.

Important in the revival of hybrid genres of early music was the rise of interest in medievalism in general and medieval re-enactment, medieval markets and renaissance fairs in particular, from the late 1980s in Germany and America. This period saw the creation of a number of acoustic medieval folk bands, particularly in Germany, many of which played markets and fairs. These included Corvus Corax, from 1989, In Extremo from 1995, Schandmaul from 1998, Saltatio Mortis from 2000, and Faun from 2002. There are still a vibrant medieval folk rock scene on German medieval festivals, and bands like Schandmaul and Faun have gained popularity beyond the medieval scene.

Corvus Corax began the metal side project Tanzwut from 1996 and from 1998 In Extremo moved from acoustic to a heavy metal sound. Together with hard rock and heavy metal outfit Subway to Sally (founded in 1992), who shifted from folk towards German medieval music in 1995, these bands are usually seen as the founders of the German Medieval metal subgenre.

While these bands moved off into heavy metal music, in roughly the same period a number of performers emerged who mixed early music and acoustic instruments with soft or hard rock, relying heavily on the network of medieval markets and renaissance fairs. Ritchie Blackmore, having dropped musical clues to his interest in early music throughout his career, took the surprising step of forming the renaissance focused rock band Blackmore's Night with vocalist Candice Night in 1997. Blackmore is usually careful to describe his music as 'renaissance rock', which is more accurate as a description of the source of his inspiration, but also distinguishes it from other forms of medieval based music. The Canadian/American band "Elflore" is following in the footsteps of Blackmore's Night with Renaissance Rock. They are very new to the scene and are currently working on their first album. Other performers who produce medieval electric music include the California-based Avalon Rising and Circulus from England, both of which describe their music, among other things, as medieval folk rock.

There was a revival of medieval folk rock of sorts in England in the late 1980s. Shave the Monkey from 1988 managed to use British and European folk festivals to support a career that continued until 2003. The more progressive cult band the Morrigan formed in 1985, but they were unable to release their first album until 1996. Wider acceptance for these performers had to wait until the 'folk resurgence' of the 1990s. More recently there have been indications of a return to an interest in medieval folk rock among established folk rock musicians. Since 1986 Maddy Prior, formerly of Steeleye Span, has toured and recorded with the acoustic early music group The Carnival Band. Guitarist Richard Thompson joined recorder player Philip Pickett for an album of early music mixed with rock, The Bones of All Men (1998), and has toured with his show 1000 Years of Popular Music (2003) which included thirteenth-century rounds and baroque versions of modern pop songs.

In 2018 performance poet and multi-instrumentalist Attila the Stockbroker launched his band Barnstormer 1649, combining early music and punk using many period instruments alongside a punk rock backline. They released an album 'Restoration Tragedy' in September 2018 and are currently active and touring.
