= List of Revenge episodes =

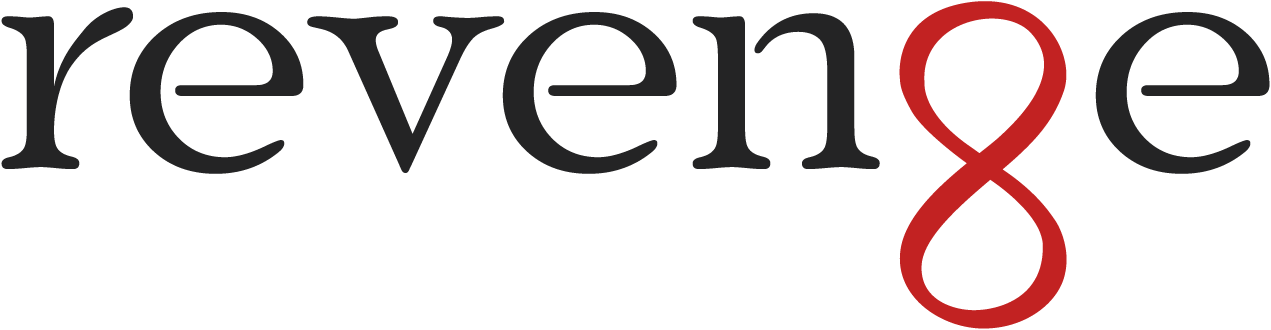

Revenge is an American psychological thriller television series that premiered on ABC on September 21, 2011. The series was created by Mike Kelley and is inspired by the Alexandre Dumas novel The Count of Monte Cristo. The series stars Madeleine Stowe and Emily VanCamp.

On April 29, 2015, ABC announced the cancellation of the series after four seasons. The final episode aired on May 10, 2015. During the course of the series, 89 episodes of Revenge aired.

== Series overview ==
Season	Episodes	Originally released	
Season	Episodes	First released	Last released
1	22	September 21, 2011	May 23, 2012
2	22	September 30, 2012	May 12, 2013
3	22	September 29, 2013	May 11, 2014
4	23	September 28, 2014	May 10, 2015

== Episodes ==
=== Season 1 (2011–12) ===
No. overall	No. in season	Title	Directed by	Written by	Original release date	Prod. code	US viewers (millions)
1	1	"Pilot"	Phillip Noyce	Mike Kelley	September 21, 2011	101	10.02
2	2	"Trust"	Phillip Noyce	Mike Kelley & Joe Fazzio	September 28, 2011	102	8.54
3	3	"Betrayal"	Matt Earl Beesley	Salvatore Stabile	October 5, 2011	103	7.68
4	4	"Duplicity"	Matt Shakman	Wendy Calhoun	October 12, 2011	104	7.90
5	5	"Guilt"	Kenneth Fink	Nikki Toscano	October 19, 2011	105	7.94
6	6	"Intrigue"	Tim Hunter	Dan Dworkin & Jay Beattie	October 26, 2011	106	8.72
7	7	"Charade"	Sanford Bookstaver	Mark B. Perry & Joe Fazzio	November 2, 2011	107	8.58
8	8	"Treachery"	Bobby Roth	Ryan Scott	November 16, 2011	108	7.98
9	9	"Suspicion"	Bethany Rooney	Salvatore Stabile	November 23, 2011	109	7.30
10	10	"Loyalty"	J. Miller Tobin	Wendy Calhoun & Nikki Toscano	December 7, 2011	110	7.35
11	11	"Duress"	Jamie Babbit	Elle Triedman	January 4, 2012	111	8.06
12	12	"Infamy"	Matt Earl Beesley	Dan Dworkin & Jay Beattie	January 11, 2012	112	7.58
13	13	"Commitment"	Kenneth Fink	Mark B. Perry & Liz Tigelaar	January 18, 2012	113	7.67
14	14	"Perception"	Tim Hunter	Nikki Toscano & Sallie Patrick	February 8, 2012	114	7.70
15	15	"Chaos"	Sanford Bookstaver	Mark Fish & Joe Fazzio	February 15, 2012	115	7.69
16	16	"Scandal"	Kenneth Fink	Elle Triedman	February 29, 2012	116	7.53
17	17	"Doubt"	Matt Earl Beesley	Story by : Mike Kelley; Teleplay by : Dan Dworkin & Jay Beattie	April 18, 2012	117	7.77
18	18	"Justice"	Bobby Roth	Sallie Patrick & Liz Tigelaar	April 25, 2012	118	7.03
19	19	"Absolution"	Sanford Bookstaver	Nikki Toscano & Ryan Scott	May 2, 2012	119	7.14
20	20	"Legacy"	Eric Laneuville	Dan Dworkin & Jay Beattie	May 9, 2012	120	7.01
21	21	"Grief"	Randy Zisk	Mark Fish & Joe Fazzio	May 16, 2012	121	6.90
22	22	"Reckoning"	Sanford Bookstaver	Mike Kelley & Mark B. Perry	May 23, 2012	122	7.85

=== Season 2 (2012–13) ===
No. overall	No. in season	Title	Directed by	Written by	Original release date	Prod. code	US viewers (millions)
23	1	"Destiny"	Kenneth Fink	Mike Kelley & Mark B. Perry	September 30, 2012	201	9.74
24	2	"Resurrection"	David Grossman	Sallie Patrick	October 7, 2012	202	8.36
25	3	"Confidence"	J. Miller Tobin	Gretchen J. Berg & Aaron Harberts	October 14, 2012	203	8.28
26	4	"Intuition"	Randy Zisk	Dan Dworkin & Jay Beattie	October 21, 2012	204	8.71
27	5	"Forgiveness"	Matt Earl Beesley	Sunil Nayar	October 28, 2012	205	8.18
28	6	"Illusion"	Bobby Roth	Michael Foley	November 4, 2012	206	7.94
29	7	"Penance"	Colin Bucksey	Elle Triedman	November 11, 2012	207	7.73
30	8	"Lineage"	Christopher Misiano	Nikki Toscano	November 25, 2012	208	6.92
31	9	"Revelations"	Kenneth Fink	Ted Sullivan	December 2, 2012	209	7.65
32	10	"Power"	Roger Kumble	Joe Fazzio	January 6, 2013	210	7.12
33	11	"Sabotage"	John Scott	Dan Dworkin & Jay Beattie	January 13, 2013	211	6.17
34	12	"Collusion"	Matt Shakman	Sallie Patrick & Sunil Nayar	January 20, 2013	212	5.75
35	13	"Union"	Wendey Stanzler	Michael Foley & Ted Sullivan	February 10, 2013	213	5.20
36	14	"Sacrifice"	Stefan Schwartz	Mark B. Perry & Joe Fazzio	February 17, 2013	214	5.99
37	15	"Retribution"	Helen Hunt	Nikki Toscano & Elle Triedman	March 10, 2013	215	6.97
38	16	"Illumination"	Bobby Roth	Michael Foley & Sallie Patrick	March 17, 2013	216	6.57
39	17	"Victory"	Colin Bucksey	Dan Dworkin & Jay Beattie	March 24, 2013	217	6.31
40	18	"Masquerade"	Allison Liddi-Brown	Sunil Nayar & JaSheika James	March 31, 2013	218	5.49
41	19	"Identity"	Charlie Stratton	Joe Fazzio & Ted Sullivan	April 28, 2013	219	6.05
42	20	"Engagement"	John Terlesky	Elle Triedman & Salle Patrick	May 5, 2013	220	6.28
43–44	21–22	"Truth"	Randy Zisk	Michael Foley & Nikki Toscano	May 12, 2013	221	6.12
43–44	21–22	"Truth"	J. Miller Tobin	Mike Kelley & Mark B. Perry	May 12, 2013	222	6.12

=== Season 3 (2013–14) ===
No. overall	No. in season	Title	Directed by	Written by	Original release date	Prod. code	US viewers (millions)
45	1	"Fear"	Kenneth Fink	Sunil Nayar	September 29, 2013	301	8.11
46	2	"Sin"	John Scott	Joe Fazzio	October 6, 2013	302	6.84
47	3	"Confession"	Matt Earl Beesley	Sallie Patrick	October 13, 2013	303	6.00
48	4	"Mercy"	J. Miller Tobin	Karin Gist	October 20, 2013	304	6.16
49	5	"Control"	Allison Liddi-Brown	Ted Sullivan	October 27, 2013	305	5.71
50	6	"Dissolution"	Bobby Roth	Gretchen J. Berg & Aaron Harberts	November 3, 2013	306	6.33
51	7	"Resurgence"	John Scott	Christopher Fife	November 10, 2013	307	5.49
52	8	"Secrecy"	Colin Bucksey	Sallie Patrick & JaSheika James	November 17, 2013	308	5.81
53	9	"Surrender"	Jennifer Getzinger	Joe Fazzio	December 8, 2013	309	6.04
54	10	"Exodus"	Kenneth Fink	Sunil Nayar & Karin Gist	December 15, 2013	310	6.22
55	11	"Homecoming"	Matt Earl Beesley	Ted Sullivan	January 5, 2014	311	6.69
56	12	"Endurance"	Sanford Bookstaver	Sallie Patrick	January 12, 2014	312	5.71
57	13	"Hatred"	John Terlesky	Gretchen J. Berg & Aaron Harberts	January 19, 2014	313	5.37
58	14	"Payback"	Romeo Tirone	Sunil Nayar & Christopher Fife	March 9, 2014	314	6.60
59	15	"Struggle"	Christopher Misiano	Michael J. Cinquemani	March 16, 2014	315	6.24
60	16	"Disgrace"	Matt Shakman	Shannon Goss	March 23, 2014	316	5.66
61	17	"Addiction"	Tara Nicole Weyr	Joe Fazzio	March 30, 2014	317	5.25
62	18	"Blood"	Wendey Stanzler	Karin Gist	April 6, 2014	318	5.16
63	19	"Allegiance"	Jennifer Wilkinson	Ted Sullivan	April 13, 2014	319	5.26
64	20	"Revolution"	Christine Moore	Sunil Nayar & Michael J. Cinquemani	April 27, 2014	320	5.19
65	21	"Impetus"	J. Miller Tobin	Gretchen J. Berg & Aaron Harberts	May 4, 2014	321	4.98
66	22	"Execution"	Kenneth Fink	Sunil Nayar & Joe Fazzio	May 11, 2014	322	4.87

=== Season 4 (2014–15) ===
No. overall	No. in season	Title	Directed by	Written by	Original release date	Prod. code	US viewers (millions)
67	1	"Renaissance"	John Terlesky	Sunil Nayar & Sallie Patrick	September 28, 2014	401	5.14
68	2	"Disclosure"	Kenneth Fink	Joe Fazzio	October 5, 2014	402	5.27
69	3	"Ashes"	Colin Bucksey	Alex Taub	October 12, 2014	403	4.66
70	4	"Meteor"	J. Miller Tobin	Karin Gist	October 19, 2014	404	5.00
71	5	"Repercussions"	Kate Woods	Ted Sullivan	October 26, 2014	405	4.32
72	6	"Damage"	John Terlesky	Christopher Fife & Sallie Patrick	November 2, 2014	406	4.67
73	7	"Ambush"	Hanelle Culpepper	Shannon Goss	November 9, 2014	407	5.26
74	8	"Contact"	Paul Holahan	Joe Fazzio	November 16, 2014	408	5.23
75	9	"Intel"	Wendey Stanzler	Karin Gist	November 30, 2014	409	4.08
76	10	"Atonement"	John Terlesky	Ted Sullivan	December 7, 2014	410	4.60
77	11	"Epitaph"	Bobby Roth	Alex Taub	January 4, 2015	411	3.97
78	12	"Madness"	Matt Shakman	Sallie Patrick	January 11, 2015	412	3.67
79	13	"Abduction"	John Scott	Christopher Fife	January 18, 2015	413	4.09
80	14	"Kindred"	Colin Bucksey	Nancy Kiu	January 25, 2015	414	3.76
81	15	"Bait"	Ty Trullinger	Shannon Goss	March 8, 2015	415	4.89
82	16	"Retaliation"	Alrick Riley	Jesse Lasky	March 15, 2015	416	4.78
83	17	"Loss"	Helen Hunt	Joe Fazzio	March 22, 2015	417	4.42
84	18	"Clarity"	Allison Liddi-Brown	Karin Gist	March 29, 2015	418	4.22
85	19	"Exposure"	Jennifer Wilkinson	Wilson Pollock & Andrew Steier	April 12, 2015	423	3.84
86	20	"Burn"	Kenneth Fink	Ted Sullivan	April 19, 2015	419	3.90
87	21	"Aftermath"	Rob J. Greenlea	Shannon Goss & Christopher Fife	April 26, 2015	420	4.45
88	22	"Plea"	J. Miller Tobin	Alex Taub	May 3, 2015	421	4.82
89	23	"Two Graves"	John Terlesky	Joe Fazzio	May 10, 2015	422	4.80

=== Specials ===
Special no.	Title	Narrator	Aired between	Original air date	U.S. viewers (millions)
1	"From the Beginning"	Emily VanCamp as Emily Thorne	"Scandal" (episode 16) "Doubt" (episode 17)	April 11, 2012	5.60
2	"The First Chapter"	Gabriel Mann as Nolan Ross	"Reckoning" (season 1, episode 22) "Destiny" (season 2, episode 1)	September 26, 2012	5.20

== Ratings ==
Revenge : U.S. viewers per episode (millions)

Season	Episode number																						
Season	1	2	3	4	5	6	7	8	9	10	11	12	13	14	15	16	17	18	19	20	21	22	23
1	10.02	8.54	7.68	7.90	7.94	8.72	8.58	7.98	7.30	7.35	8.06	7.58	7.67	7.70	7.69	7.53	7.77	7.03	7.14	7.01	6.90	7.85	–
2	9.74	8.36	8.28	8.71	8.18	7.94	7.73	6.92	7.65	7.12	6.17	5.75	5.20	5.99	6.97	6.57	6.31	5.49	6.05	6.28	6.12	6.12	–
3	8.11	6.84	6.00	6.16	5.71	6.33	5.49	5.81	6.04	6.22	6.69	5.71	5.37	6.60	6.24	5.66	5.25	5.16	5.26	5.19	4.98	4.87	–
4	5.14	5.27	4.66	5.00	4.32	4.67	5.26	5.23	4.08	4.60	3.97	3.67	4.09	3.76	4.89	4.78	4.42	4.22	3.84	3.90	4.45	4.82	4.80

Audience measurement performed by Nielsen Media Research

== Home media release ==
Season	Episodes	DVD release dates			
Season	Episodes	Region 1	Region 2	Region 4	Discs
1	22	August 21, 2012	November 19, 2012	October 3, 2012	5
2	22	August 20, 2013	October 21, 2013	October 2, 2013	5
3	22	August 26, 2014	October 20, 2014	October 8, 2014	5
4	23	August 25, 2015	October 19, 2015	October 21, 2015	5
