= Revenge season 1 =

Revenge
- Season 1
- DVD cover
- Starring: Madeleine Stowe; Emily VanCamp; Gabriel Mann; Henry Czerny; Ashley Madekwe; Nick Wechsler; Josh Bowman; Connor Paolo; Christa B. Allen
- No. of episodes: 22

Release
- Original network: ABC
- Original release: September 21, 2011 – May 23, 2012

Season chronology
- Next → Season 2

The first season of the ABC American television drama series Revenge premiered on September 21, 2011, and concluded on May 23, 2012, with a total of 22 episodes. The series was created by Mike Kelley and is inspired by the Alexandre Dumas novel The Count of Monte Cristo. The series stars Madeleine Stowe and Emily VanCamp.

== Plot ==
Emily Thorne (Emily VanCamp) comes to the Hamptons, renting a home next to the Grayson family to enjoy a bright summer. However, it is revealed that Emily has been to the Hamptons before as a little girl. In reality, Emily is Amanda Clarke, whose father was framed for a crime he did not commit and sent to prison for life. She was permanently separated from him and never saw him again. Now, she has returned to the Hamptons, intent on getting revenge against those who wronged her and her father, the top of that list being Victoria Grayson (Madeleine Stowe), matriarch of the Grayson family and the woman whom her father loved and who, in the end, betrayed him.

As she sets her plan in motion, Emily tries to navigate the upper society to destroy those who betrayed her father. But the further she goes, the more her emotions get involved and the more she questions her motives and the moves she makes.

== Cast ==
=== Main cast ===
- Madeleine Stowe as Victoria Grayson
- Emily VanCamp as Emily Thorne/Amanda Clarke
- Gabriel Mann as Nolan Ross
- Henry Czerny as Conrad Grayson
- Ashley Madekwe as Ashley Davenport
- Nick Wechsler as Jack Porter
- Josh Bowman as Daniel Grayson
- Connor Paolo as Declan Porter
- Christa B. Allen as Charlotte Grayson

=== Recurring cast ===
- James Tupper as David Clarke
- Emily Alyn Lind as young Amanda Clarke
- Ashton Holmes as Tyler Barrol
- Margarita Levieva as Amanda Clarke/Emily Thorne
- Amber Valletta as Lydia Davis
- Ed Corbin as Bull
- Max Martini as Frank Stevens
- Cassius Willis as Detective Robert Gunther
- Robbie Amell as Adam Connor
- James McCaffrey as Ryan Huntley
- Hiroyuki Sanada as Satoshi Takeda
- Courtney B. Vance as Benjamin Brooks
- Yancey Arias as Senator Tom Kingsly
- Roger Bart as Leo Mason Treadwell
- Merrin Dungey as Barbara Snow
- James Morrison as Gordon Murphy
- Derek Ray as Lee Moran

=== Guest cast ===
- Veronica Cartwright as Judge Elizabeth Blackwell
- William Devane as Edward Grayson
- Tess Harper as Carole Miller
- Amy Landecker as Dr. Michelle Banks
- CCH Pounder as Warden Sharon Stiles
- James Purefoy as Dominik Wright
- Alicia Coppola as Melissa Robbins
- Cynthia McFadden as herself

== Development and production ==
In January 2011, ABC ordered the script to pilot. In March 2011, actress Emily VanCamp was cast as the lead character, and shortly afterwards it was released that Ashley Madekwe was cast in the series. Madeleine Stowe and Henry Czerny joined the cast as well. Max Martini and Robbie Amell joined the cast as Frank Stevens, a private investigator and Adam, a wealthy student who is hoping to attend Yale. James Tupper replaced Marc Blucas in the role of Emily's father, after Blucas was forced to drop out due to his commitment on Necessary Roughness. Recurring Gossip Girl star Connor Paolo was cast as a series regular playing the character of Declan Porter. Former Nikita star Ashton Holmes landed a recurring role as Tyler Barrol, a Harvard classmate of Daniel Grayson.

On May 13, 2011, ABC picked the project up to series. On May 17, 2011, ABC announced that the series would air on Wednesday nights at 10:00 pm Eastern/9:00 pm Central in the 2011 fall season.

== Episodes ==
No. overall	No. in season	Title	Directed by	Written by	Original release date	Prod. code	US viewers (millions)
1	1	"Pilot"	Phillip Noyce	Mike Kelley	September 21, 2011	101	10.02
As the Hamptons prepares for another summer, new arrival Emily Thorne makes her presence known by gaining access to the exclusive social circle of business mogul Conrad Grayson and his socialite wife Victoria. But it soon becomes clear that this young woman has a dark past. Known in another life as Amanda Clarke, her world came crashing down when her father was falsely accused of channeling money to a terrorist organization. After years of careful preparation, Emily is determined to seek vengeance on the people who destroyed her father's life by making their lives come crashing down around them. Because when everything you love has been stolen from you, the only thing you have left is revenge.
2	2	"Trust"	Phillip Noyce	Mike Kelley & Joe Fazzio	September 28, 2011	102	8.54
Emily juggles working with family friend Nolan Ross, going on her first date with Conrad's son Daniel, and taking down her father's trusted friend; Victoria's suspicions about Emily prompt her to dig deeper into the socialite's mysterious past; and Amanda's childhood friend Jack Porter becomes embroiled in his family's secrets.
3	3	"Betrayal"	Matt Earl Beesley	Salvatore Stabile	October 5, 2011	103	7.68
Emily's blossoming relationships threaten to jeopardize her plan to take down the federal prosecutor who convicted her father; Victoria's suspicions about Emily increase after she uncovers a connection to Conrad's mistress Lydia; and Emily's friend Ashley finds herself attracted to Daniel's college friend, unaware that he has an agenda of his own.
4	4	"Duplicity"	Matt Shakman	Wendy Calhoun	October 12, 2011	104	7.90
Emily trains her sights on taking down the psychiatrist responsible for institutionalizing her as a child; Victoria notices that her daughter Charlotte is becoming attracted to Jack's younger brother Declan; Conrad takes a clandestine trip to Lydia's apartment in an attempt to restart their relationship; and Jack faces a difficult decision about the Stowaway's future.
5	5	"Guilt"	Kenneth Fink	Nikki Toscano	October 19, 2011	105	7.94
When Lydia returns to the Hamptons with a vendetta against both Emily and Victoria, Conrad discovers that she plans to reveal her involvement in the David Clarke conspiracy. Victoria is overwhelmed by feelings of guilt over her involvement in David Clarke's demise. Daniel makes a life-changing decision after learning of Tyler's betrayal. Declan's relationship with Charlotte continues to evolve. Nolan discovers that Lydia is suspicious about Emily after the secret whale camera he placed in Emily's house ends up in Lydia's Manhattan apartment. Frank breaks into Lydia's apartment and finds a series of items that suggest Lydia was behind the downfall of Bill Harmon, Senator Kingsley and Dr. Michelle Banks – unaware that Emily arranged for the items to be sent. Lydia returns to the apartment and the two engage in a scuffle that results in Lydia falling five stories onto the roof of a taxi, a scuffle that Nolan witnesses from his whale cam.
6	6	"Intrigue"	Tim Hunter	Dan Dworkin & Jay Beattie	October 26, 2011	106	8.72
With Lydia in a comatose state and preparations for Victoria's annual Fourth of July gala underway, Emily plans to break the bond of trust between Conrad and Frank with the incriminating video of Frank pushing Lydia off her apartment balcony, and see to it that the tension with Tyler comes to an end. Daniel gets a job as a bartender at the Stowaway and finds his first night may be his last. Nolan finds himself in a situation where Frank threatens him. Declan plans to court Charlotte with a lavish date using money he earns via shady means.
7	7	"Charade"	Sanford Bookstaver	Mark B. Perry & Joe Fazzio	November 2, 2011	107	8.58
Conrad and Victoria's plans to celebrate their 25th wedding anniversary with a simple family dinner are ruined when a high-profile newspaper article spotlights Emily's relationship with Daniel, which leads to several unwanted guests attending dinner. Nolan is enlisted to get Tyler away from the Graysons, with seductive results. Conrad is haunted in the wake of Lydia's accident and a desperate Frank digs into Emily's past in order to prove his steadfast loyalty to Victoria. Frank learns Emily's real identity along with another secret from her dark past; the real Emily Thorne switched identities with Amanda Clarke during their time in juvenile detention. Victoria demands Conrad move out of their mansion, Lydia wakes up from her coma and Frank confronts "Amanda" at the strip club where she works, only to be murdered in cold blood.
8	8	"Treachery"	Bobby Roth	Ryan Scott	November 16, 2011	108	7.98
Emily's master plan begins to unravel when the real Emily Thorne arrives in the Hamptons – after killing Frank – and seduces Jack, making the young woman an unwanted pawn in the game. Victoria's unstable relationship with her family grows increasingly tense as a recovering Lydia slowly begins to remember and an embittered Tyler begins to play dirty.
9	9	"Suspicion"	Bethany Rooney	Salvatore Stabile	November 23, 2011	109	7.30
After learning 'Amanda' has turned against her, a desperate Emily turns to her mentor Satoshi Takeda for advice. Victoria's worst nightmare comes true when she finds herself alone in her life. Charlotte continues her secret romance with Declan, Ashley betrays Emily in an attempt to have Victoria see her as more than an assistant, and Tyler's negative influence over Daniel continues to grow.
10	10	"Loyalty"	J. Miller Tobin	Wendy Calhoun & Nikki Toscano	December 7, 2011	110	7.35
Emily discovers Nolan's sexual liaisons with Tyler and plans to use this to her advantage, although she continues to question Nolan's loyalty. Jack's romance with 'Amanda' continues to blossom as word of her presence spreads throughout the Hamptons. Conrad files for divorce and Victoria is persuaded to hire attorney and old friend Ryan Huntley to represent her – the same man who represented David Clarke at his trial.
11	11	"Duress"	Jamie Babbit	Elle Triedman	January 4, 2012	111	8.06
Emily plans to eliminate Tyler to prevent him from interfering with her master plan, Charlotte becomes a pawn in her parents' bitter divorce proceedings, and Conrad continues to be blackmailed by Tyler. An unstable Tyler interrupts Daniel's birthday celebration and threatens to kill Emily unless Conrad tells the truth about David Clarke. Nolan manages to escape from his bindings with the help of Tyler's brother Alexander and stops Tyler at the last minute. Tyler is then knocked unconscious by Daniel and arrested by the Hamptons Police. It is revealed that Emily planted Frank's wallet on Tyler, and Victoria learns that Huntley knows a doctor who will forge documents proving she had a miscarriage, which would invalidate her prenuptial agreement with Conrad due to duress.
12	12	"Infamy"	Matt Earl Beesley	Dan Dworkin & Jay Beattie	January 11, 2012	112	7.58
Emily sets her sights on a new target when best-selling author Mason Treadwell, a news reporter who became famous after writing a tell-all that condemned David Clarke, returns to the Hamptons. Conrad orchestrates a plan to get Daniel involved in the divorce proceedings, Victoria plans to take control of Grayson Global, and Jack begins to feel he's let his guard down with 'Amanda'. Emily infiltrates Mason's home while he is at dinner with Nolan and manages to steal several tapes containing interviews Mason had with David Clarke, before setting the house on fire. The next morning, Emily watches one of the tapes and learns the possibility of Charlotte being David Clarke's biological daughter, and her half-sister.
13	13	"Commitment"	Kenneth Fink	Mark B. Perry & Liz Tigelaar	January 18, 2012	113	7.67
Daniel plans on proposing to Emily to gain access to his trust fund, a devastated Charlotte is forced to move back home with her mother, Jack's life is put in jeopardy when someone close betrays him, and Nolan forces Emily to think twice about her actions. It is revealed that Huntley is working for Emily and switched the DNA samples, only for Victoria to fire him. Emily tells 'Amanda' the truth and convinces her to leave the Hamptons to keep Jack safe. Daniel confronts Victoria about Charlotte and begins to think David Clarke raped his mother when she finds it difficult to talk about their affair. Daniel tells Emily this and her plan for revenge is intensified.
14	14	"Perception"	Tim Hunter	Nikki Toscano & Sallie Patrick	February 8, 2012	114	7.70
As Emily and Daniel prepare for their upcoming engagement party, Jack becomes even more concerned about where 'Amanda' has gone, and Victoria decides to regain the upper hand in her divorce from Conrad by using his father Edward Grayson, original CEO of Grayson Global and current Board Chairman, against him. At the conclusion of the episode, Jack interrupts the Graysons' dinner party and warns Victoria to stop her lies. Conrad reveals the truth that Charlotte is David Clarke's biological daughter and that Victoria had an affair with him. Edward, angered with Conrad and Victoria, suggests to Conrad that Daniel should become the CEO of Grayson Global. Emily then returns home to find that someone has broken in and stolen her infinity box, and so knows her secret.
15	15	"Chaos"	Sanford Bookstaver	Mark Fish & Joe Fazzio	February 15, 2012	115	7.69
Back to where the pilot began, it is Labor Day weekend in the Hamptons and the Graysons are eager to celebrate Daniel's engagement to Emily at the "Fire & Ice Ball." But when Tyler makes an unexpected return and kidnaps 'Amanda', Emily's vendetta puts everyone she loves and hates in imminent mortal danger. Jack resolves to find 'Amanda,' and Charlotte takes desperate measures to soothe the pain of her family's betrayal. Jack follows 'Amanda' to the beach and finds her standing over a dead body. When Charlotte and Declan appear for a midnight swim, Jack attempts to hide the body but Daniel's cellphone rings and forces Jack to run off with his sweatshirt covered in blood. As Charlotte's screams alert the guests, Satoshi Takeda takes 'Amanda' in his car and it's revealed that the dead body is Tyler's. Daniel emerges a moment later in a dazed state with his tuxedo covered in Tyler's blood and Victoria tells him not to say anything.
16	16	"Scandal"	Kenneth Fink	Elle Triedman	February 29, 2012	116	7.53
The Hamptons Police Department investigate the murder of Tyler Barrol and suspect Daniel is the killer, Declan suspects Jack was the hooded figure on the beach, Ashley betrays Daniel in order to further her career, and Emily works with Nolan to get Jack out of the Hamptons. Daniel is arrested for Tyler's murder and sent to Rikers Island after being denied bail. It is revealed that Satoshi Takeda is the one who killed Tyler and framed Daniel in order to help Emily's master plan.
17	17	"Doubt"	Matt Earl Beesley	Story by : Mike Kelley; Teleplay by : Dan Dworkin & Jay Beattie	April 18, 2012	117	7.77
As Daniel stands trial for Tyler's murder, Victoria's surprise reunion with her ex-lover Dominik Wright poses a threat to her family's struggles, and Jack's desperate search for Amanda is put on hold when he is named a prime suspect in the murder investigation. When Emily discovers Victoria's new henchman, Lee Moran, she beats him up in a dark alley and makes an imprint of his key.
18	18	"Justice"	Bobby Roth	Sallie Patrick & Liz Tigelaar	April 25, 2012	118	7.03
As the Graysons become embroiled in an insidious cover-up, Emily discovers that her father's death was intentional, and Declan's relationship with a self-destructive Charlotte deteriorates when he testifies in court as the prosecution's final witness in the 'People v. Daniel Grayson' trial. Daniel grows more and more suspicious of Emily's intentions, until finally he shows up at her house, possibly with consequences due to his ankle bracelet. His argument is that Emily is sneaking around with Jack. Emily steals Jack's bloody coat and leaves it in Lee Moran's car, which leads to Lee being sent to Rikers. When Lee threatens to expose Victoria and Conrad for the David Clarke scandal, Conrad orders his henchman to murder Lee Moran. Daniel is released from jail by Judge Hawthorne, and Emily learns that the Graysons ordered the same henchman who killed Lee to kill David Clarke.
19	19	"Absolution"	Sanford Bookstaver	Nikki Toscano & Ryan Scott	May 2, 2012	119	7.14
Because Emily framed Lee Moran for the murder of Tyler Barrol, Daniel is released from Rikers Island. Victoria gives the SEC confidential information that leads to an investigation on Grayson Global, and the discovery of a mysterious photograph taken of David Clarke the day he died leads Emily to more clues concerning his murder – and to former Grayson Global secretary Carol Miller, a woman who turns out to be Nolan's aunt. Conrad tells Daniel everything about the David Clarke case, with Daniel promising Conrad to take over Grayson Global if Conrad is ever convicted. Daniel makes his loyalty to his father known in a television interview with ABC News reporter Cynthia McFadden. When Emily learns that Daniel knows of the David Clarke scandal and sees his loyalty to his father, she tells Nolan that if Daniel stands in her path, she won't hold back. Conrad also hires Ashley, after her job prospect with Benjamin Brooks falls through.
20	20	"Legacy"	Eric Laneuville	Dan Dworkin & Jay Beattie	May 9, 2012	120	7.01
In 2002, a reckless Emily is still Amanda Clarke, wasting away her new fortune at parties and living a self-destructive lifestyle, until Nolan finds her and convinces her to read her father's journals. Going back to the Hamptons, she begins putting together the information about her father being framed by the Graysons. Emily goes undercover as a server at the Graysons' New Year's Eve party, where many of the people who were aware of or were a part of David Clarke being framed are in attendance. While there, she meets Roger Halstead, the only other man who remained loyal to her father, and speaks with him about avenging David. Though refusing to help her, he later sneaks her a note, promising to help her bring down the Graysons, but is murdered by the Graysons' head of security, Frank Stevens, who believes he sent an incriminating letter to the Graysons days before. It is revealed that Roger Halstead's death was a mistake, as Mason Treadwell admits to Victoria he sent the letter to see what inspiration he could gather. Quickly putting together who was responsible for Roger's murder, Emily vows revenge against the Graysons.
21	21	"Grief"	Randy Zisk	Mark Fish & Joe Fazzio	May 16, 2012	121	6.90
Emily steps up the hunt to find information and search for the white-haired man who killed her father in prison. Daniel and Emily have an argument during their wedding planning with Ashley. Emily and Jack console each other when Jack's dog Sammy becomes fatally ill. Emily and Jack kiss and Ashley witnesses them. Lydia returns with a vengeance against Victoria and a passion for Conrad. Victoria finds damaging information on Grayson Global hidden behind the deKooning that Dominik forged. When Daniel tricks Victoria to return the evidence, Emily hatches a plan to steal the documents from Daniel's briefcase. Declan becomes friendly with Jaime Cardaci, a new female student, which Charlotte discovers and in response she doubles her drug addiction with oxycodone. As Nolan plants cameras in the white-haired man's home, he is knocked unconscious and kidnapped.
22	22	"Reckoning"	Sanford Bookstaver	Mike Kelley & Mark B. Perry	May 23, 2012	122	7.85
The Grayson's empire is slowly self-destructing as Emily moves forward with the final phases of her master plan for revenge. When Emily discovers her closest ally, Nolan, has been kidnapped and held hostage by the white-haired man, she comes face to face with him and a fight ensues. Ashley has to make an important decision regarding her loyalties, and she betrays Emily once again by telling Daniel that she Jack and Emily kissing. Daniel confronts Emily, who says that she is not the person he fell in love with. She tells him he is turning into all the things he never wanted to be, and returns his engagement ring. Emily decides she will tell Jack that she loves him and reveal her true identity. However, she finds that Amanda is back and is pregnant, leaving Emily heartbroken. Charlotte reveals an affair Jaime had with a history teacher to the whole school, embarrassing her publicly; Declan tells Charlotte to never talk to him again. Through John McGowen, Victoria discovers Conrad signed contracts to kill David Clarke: They fly to Washington D.C. for the trial involving Conrad and the recent terrorist allegations passed to the SEC, but the "white-haired man" sabotages their plane, which also has Lydia on board, causing it to crash. After hearing that no survivors have been found, Charlotte calls Declan to tell him, but he tells her he will never speak to her again and hangs up the phone, causing her to overdose. Nolan reveals to Emily that the evidence that Conrad tried to destroy shows the framing and death of her father involves so much more than the Graysons; many others played a role in it. Emily finds out from an old security camera tape of Victoria's that her mother is still alive; the series ends as she tells Nolan to resume playing the tape.

== Reception ==
=== Critical reception ===
The first season has been met with generally favorable reviews, with a collective score of 8.3/10 from 37,268 users on IMDb and 65/100 from 20 media reviews on Metacritic.

Dorothy Rabinowitz of The Wall Street Journal praised the series, writing that "The arrival of one pure and unadulterated drama about a passion as old as man is something to celebrate. That's particularly true when that drama is as spellbinding in its satisfyingly gaudy way, as Revenge turns out to be", whilst awarding particular praise to Van Camp for a "beguiling and entirely chilling study in revenge lust." Writing for The New York Times, Alessandra Stanley compared the series favorably with Gossip Girl, concluding that it has "just enough campy suspense to be enjoyable." Episode 5 of the series received particular acclaim, with C. Orlando of TV Fanatic writing that "Revenge took things to a whole new level this week", and noting with reference to the set-up of David Clarke that "Victoria seems the only one with a conscience".

BuddyTV ranked Revenge #3 on its list of 2011's best new TV shows. Yahoo! TV also mentioned the series among the top television programs of 2011.

The series made the covers of Parade, Entertainment Weekly and TV Guide, and was featured in Rolling Stone, Vanity Fair, Vogue, People, Us Weekly, Cosmopolitan, Seventeen, and Teen Vogue magazine. The season finale "Reckoning" was met with critical acclaim by fans and critics as well, calling the episode "the best season finale of 2012".

=== Ratings ===
The pilot episode scored a 3.3 Nielsen rating in the 18–49 age demographic and 10.02 million viewers, winning the 10 pm hour time slot against CSI: Crime Scene Investigation and Law & Order: Special Victims Unit. It was reported that Revenge is the highest rated television series in the hour for ABC since Lost. On October 22, 2011, it was reported that Revenge regularly won its hour in the 18–34 and 18–49 age demographics ahead of CSI and Law & Order: SVU.

After a nearly two-month hiatus since February 29, 2012, Revenge returned on April 18, 2012, at No. 1 in the Nielsen ratings and won its timeslot against every other television network with a first-place finish among Total Viewers, Adults 18–49 and Adults 25–54. Revenge won over an original episode of NBC's Law & Order: SVU in Total Viewers (+33%), Adults 18–49 (+53%) and Adults 25–54 (+45%) and generated big year-to-year time-period gains in Total Viewers (+81%), Adults 18–49 (+35%) and Adults 25–54 (+38%), rising over first-run programming on the same night last year. The April 18, 2012, episode attracted ABC's largest audience to the hour since the middle of February sweeps on February 15, 2012.

On April 25, 2012, Revenge won its timeslot for the second consecutive week when the episode rated at No. 1 in the Nielsen ratings among Total Viewers, Adults 18–49, Adults 18–34, and Adults 25–54.

Revenge is ABC’s highest-rated series overall in Wednesday’s 10 p.m. hour in more than 4 years since Lost during the 2006–07 television season.

== Ratings ==
No. in series	No. in season	Title	Air date	Rating/share (18–49)	Viewers (millions)	DVR viewers	Total (18–49)	Total viewers (Live+7)
01	1	"Pilot"	September 21, 2011	3.3/9	10.02	2.37	4.2	12.39
02	2	"Trust"	September 28, 2011	2.7/7	8.54	2.59	3.7	11.13
03	3	"Betrayal"	October 5, 2011	2.4/6	7.68	2.38	3.3	10.06
04	4	"Duplicity"	October 12, 2011	2.7/7	7.90	2.38	3.6	10.28
05	5	"Guilt"	October 19, 2011	2.5/7	7.94	2.59	3.6	10.53
06	6	"Intrigue"	October 26, 2011	2.7/7	8.72	2.51	3.8	11.23
07	7	"Charade"	November 2, 2011	3.0/8	8.58	2.56	4.1	11.14
08	8	"Treachery"	November 16, 2011	2.6/7	7.98	2.45	3.6	10.43
09	9	"Suspicion"	November 23, 2011	2.1/6	7.30	—N/a	—N/a	—N/a
10	10	"Loyalty"	December 7, 2011	2.4/6	7.35	2.75	3.5	10.10
11	11	"Duress"	January 4, 2012	2.5/7	8.06	2.67	3.6	10.73
12	12	"Infamy"	January 11, 2012	2.4/6	7.58	2.62	3.5	10.20
13	13	"Commitment"	January 18, 2012	2.5/6	7.67	2.67	3.6	10.35
14	14	"Perception"	February 8, 2012	2.5/7	7.70	2.84	3.8	10.54
15	15	"Chaos"	February 15, 2012	2.4/6	7.69	2.67	3.6	10.36
16	16	"Scandal"	February 29, 2012	2.4/6	7.53	2.67	3.5	10.20
17	17	"Doubt"	April 18, 2012	2.3/6	7.77	2.63	3.4	10.33
18	18	"Justice"	April 25, 2012	2.1/6	7.03	2.67	3.2	9.70
19	19	"Absolution"	May 2, 2012	2.1/6	7.14	2.60	3.2	9.74
20	20	"Legacy"	May 9, 2012	2.2/6	7.01	2.49	3.2	9.50
21	21	"Grief"	May 16, 2012	2.0/6	6.90	2.61	3.1	9.51
22	22	"Reckoning"	May 23, 2012	2.4/6	7.85	—N/a	—N/a	—N/a

=== UK Ratings ===
The first season was broadcast on Monday nights at 9 pm on E4.

Episode #	Title	Airdate	E4	
Episode #	Title	Airdate	Viewers^{a}	Rank
1	"Pilot"	September 21, 2011	839	#4
2	"Trust"	September 28, 2011	645	#7
3	"Betrayal"	October 5, 2011	865	#1
4	"Duplicity"	October 12, 2011	916	#1
5	"Guilt"	October 19, 2011	994	#1
6	"Intrigue"	October 26, 2011	925	#1
7	"Charade"	November 2, 2011	833	#2
8	"Treachery"	November 16, 2011	840	#2
9	"Suspicion"	November 23, 2011	826	#1
10	"Loyalty"	December 7, 2011	831	#1
11	"Duress"	January 4, 2012	765	#1
12	"Infamy"	January 11, 2012	705	#2
13	"Commitment"	January 18, 2012	938	#1
14	"Perception"	February 8, 2012	905	#1
15	"Chaos"	February 15, 2012	742	#2
16	"Scandal"	February 29, 2012	846	#1
17	"Doubt"	April 18, 2012	777	#2
18	"Justice"	April 25, 2012	829	#1
19	"Absolution"	May 2, 2012	874	#2
20	"Legacy"	May 9, 2012	792	#2
21	"Grief"	May 16, 2012	706	#2
22	"Reckoning"	May 23, 2012	817	#1

^{a}Viewers in thousands.
All viewer figures and weekly ranks are from BARB.

=== Awards ===
The first season of Revenge was nominated for Favorite New TV Drama at the 2012 People's Choice Awards. Madeleine Stowe received a Golden Globe nomination for Best Actress in a TV drama.

Year	Award	Category	Recipients and nominees	Outcome
2012	TV.com Awards	Favorite Guilty Pleasure	Revenge	Won
2012	People's Choice Awards	Favorite New TV Drama	Revenge	Nominated
2012	Golden Globe Awards	Best Actress – Television Series Drama	Madeleine Stowe	Nominated
2012	Gay and Lesbian Entertainment Critics Association	Television Performance of the Year	Madeleine Stowe	Nominated
2012	NewNowNext Awards	Best New Indulgence	Revenge	Won
2012	NewNowNext Awards	Next Mega Star	Emily VanCamp	Nominated

== Home media releases ==
The first season of Revenge was released on DVD on August 21, 2012, in region 1. The set includes all 22 episodes and bonus material such as "Nolan's World: An Interview With The Infamous Nolan Ross"; "Lifestyles Of The Rich And Dangerous: The Making Of REVENGE"; "Hamptons Bound: Preparing For Life At The Shore"; deleted scenes and bloopers.
