= Victoria Grayson =

- Revenge character
- Madeleine Stowe as Victoria Grayson
- First appearance: "Pilot" (episode 1.01)
- Last appearance: "Two Graves" (4.23)
- Created by: Mike Kelley

In-universe information
- Aliases: Victoria Eleanor Harper (maiden name)
- Gender: Female
- Occupation: First Lady of New York (2012-2013); Charity volunteer Housewife; Socialite
- Family: Marion Harper (mother, deceased in 2014); Maxwell (father, deceased)
- Spouse: Conrad Grayson (m. 1985; div. 2011)
- Children: Patrick Osbourne (son, born in 1974); Daniel Grayson (son, born in 1987 deceased in 2014); Charlotte Clarke (daughter, born in 1994)
- Nationality: American
- Born: June 11, 1958 (deceased in 2014)
- Residence: Grayson Manor; Southampton, New York, United States

Victoria Eleanor Grayson (née Harper) is the main antagonist of the ABC television series Revenge (2011–2015). She is portrayed by Madeleine Stowe.

Stowe's portrayal of the character has received critical praise. She has been nominated for a Golden Globe Award for Best Actress – Television Series Drama.

== Personality ==
Trust is one luxury I cannot afford.

— Victoria Grayson

Victoria Grayson, considered by many Hamptonites as "the Queen of the Hamptons," with a net worth of $3.9 billion, is the known matriarch of the Grayson family. Beneath her public face, she plays a role as a manipulator who can do anything to protect her social status, and eliminate anyone who gets in her way.

== Early life ==
Victoria was born to working-class parents Maxwell and Marion Harper. Maxwell walked out on his family, leaving Marion to raise their child alone and penniless. Marion killed her subsequent boyfriend Thomas, and manipulated the 15-year-old Victoria into taking the blame, claiming self-defense. Victoria then spent the next several months in a mental hospital. Upon getting out, Victoria unknowingly reconnected with her father, who she believed to be another one of her mother's boyfriends, and was manipulated by him into an incestuous relationship. When she tried to end it, he sexually assaulted her. Marion blamed her for her own rape, and threw her out of the house. To stay off the street, Victoria became friends with a man named Jimmy Brennan, who eventually raped her and got her pregnant. She gave birth to a son, Patrick, whom she gave up for adoption when she was accepted into a prestigious school in Paris. There, she began a relationship with a man named Pascal LeMarchal, who ended up cheating on her. Upon returning to the U.S., she ran an art forgery scam with her boyfriend Dominik, yet soon abandoned him to seduce the wealthy Conrad Grayson. Conrad was married to his wife Stevie at the time, who was struggling with alcoholism. While Stevie was in rehab, Victoria faked a pregnancy to pressure Conrad into divorcing his wife and marrying her.

Although she succeeded in obtaining a life of wealth and status, Victoria's marriage to Conrad was a loveless one. However in spite of this, their son Daniel was the highlight of Victoria's life. She fell in love with her neighbor David Clarke, who worked for Conrad's company Grayson Global and had a daughter of his own named Amanda. Fearing that Conrad would find out about her affair with David and leave her with nothing, Victoria framed David for money laundering in connection with a terrorist attack that brought down Flight 197, resulting in the deaths of hundreds of passengers. David was sentenced to life in prison, while Amanda was sent to the foster care system. Victoria, all the while, paid off her and Conrad's conspirators to ensure Amanda would remain locked up until the age of 18. Shortly after, Victoria realized she was pregnant with David's child, so she lured Conrad into bed to make him believe that the child was his. She named the baby girl Charlotte after David's favorite aunt. Years later, Amanda dedicates herself to avenging her family; to that end, she reinvents herself as Emily Thorne and embarks upon an intricate scheme to ruin Victoria's life. Although Victoria doesn't suspect Emily's true identity or her agenda at first, she rightfully suspects that Emily cannot be trusted and is reluctant to socialize or confide in Emily with anything about her life or past history.

== Overview ==
Conrad Grayson, Victoria's husband, hints that she comes from a working-class background. She faked her pregnancy to get the wealthy Conrad to marry her. Several flashbacks and conversations reveal that she had an affair with David Clarke, the man that she and her husband framed for a plane crash. After David Clarke was convicted, Victoria went to prosecutor Kingsley to admit her role in his framing. Conrad stopped her. He promised Kingsley unbridled political support. Another flashback reveals that she was responsible for having Amanda Clarke institutionalized by promising the court-appointed psychiatrist, Dr. Michelle Banks, her own private practice with a steady stream of wealthy clients.

=== Season 1 ===
In the episode "Pilot" Victoria learns of Conrad's affair with her best friend, Lydia Davis. Emily Thorne tampers with Conrad's room service meal at the South Fork Inn, where Conrad and Lydia secretly chose to meet. After having a sexual affair with Lydia and eating soup, Conrad has stomach pains and is in need of emergency medical attention.

Victoria rushes to the hospital thinking that Conrad is in a serious condition. Victoria then notices a South Fork Inn robe in the hospital bed and fiercely says, "Don't do it again" to her husband.

Emily mentions seeing Lydia outside the South Fork Inn and helps Victoria realize that Lydia is sleeping with Conrad. Victoria makes a beautiful speech and tells the crowd that Lydia has won the art auction. However, Victoria sends Lydia home with the Van Gogh "as a reminder of the friendship they shared."

In the episode "Trust" Victoria begins to suspect that Emily is not who she says she is. Victoria asks Frank Stevens to find information about Emily's past, in order to protect her son Daniel.

In the episode "Betrayal" the Grayson family goes to Senator Tom Kingsley. Victoria remembers when she was in love with David Clarke and the fact that he would be convicted. She revealed evidence to Kingsley exonerating David, however, Kingsley had ignored it when Conrad offered to support his political ambitions. In the present, during dinner with Victoria, Conrad, his wife, and a staffer, Kingsley receives two video e-mails showing him with his now-former mistress, Erin, whom he had given money for an abortion. Victoria throws a fundraiser for him and a still-pregnant Erin, appears smiling happily. The political speech on his computer tablet becomes an announcement of his retirement from public life.

In the episode "Duplicity" Emily's next target is Dr. Michelle Banks, a psychologist who kept her at a mental hospital. Emily publicly shows recorded video clips of meetings with Banks' patients, one of which shows Victoria saying that she sometimes wishes that her daughter, Charlotte, had not been born. Charlotte sees the video and leaves the house. Victoria is furious and threatens Dr. Banks, who later disappears.

In the episode "Guilt" Victoria gets upset when she learns that Conrad is helping Lydia. Lydia returns to the Hamptons hoping to expose Emily and get her life back. Later Victoria is seated next to a woman who lost her family in the plane crash. She learns that Lydia's introduction speech will expose the Graysons' involvement in the plane crash. To prevent this from happening, Victoria comes to Lydia and says nice things so Lydia won't do it and she doesn't expose any of Victoria's crimes.

In the episode "Charade" Ryan Huntley, an attorney, approaches Victoria regarding her divorce from Conrad. Huntley has some conditions for his new client, such as financial transparency and Victoria's full support to do whatever is necessary to take Conrad down. The Grayson's celebrate their wedding anniversary, but it ends with Victoria kicking Conrad out. Later, Frank calls her while he is being killed.

In "Treachery" Victoria brings Lydia to her house when Lydia comes out of her coma, with her memories missing. Victoria shows Lydia a copy of the scathing speech she intended to make the night she fell over her balcony. Victoria and Conrad get into a heated discussion about the investigation involving Frank.

In the episode "Suspicion" Victoria is alone in her home after driving Daniel to move in with Emily, and Charlotte is mad at her. After finding out about Declan and Charlotte, Victoria confiscates Charlotte's phone and car keys before she heads to the Stowaway. Victoria tries to pay off Declan, and she thinks it worked. She then finds out that Conrad took Lydia away.

In the episode "Duress" Victoria is upset that Daniel wants something small for his birthday. During the divorce settlement meeting, Victoria's lawyer points out that because she was pregnant when she signed the pre-nup, Victoria had the right to take 50 percent of Conrad's earnings. She later reveals to the lawyer that she lied at the time and that she miscarried after 10 weeks. Emily sees an interview where her father stated that Victoria's then-newborn daughter, Charlotte, may be his, as a result of their affair, and her half-sister.

In the episode "Infamy" Emily sends an anonymous tape of David to Conrad that reveals Charlotte as David's daughter. Realizing she's cornered, Victoria invites Amanda over to confirm she was the one who sent the tape and to get proof that she is who she claims to be. She later sends somebody to get the rest of the tapes from Amanda's bedroom that Emily had planted there. Victoria is shocked and upset when Daniel proposes to Emily and she accepts, but decides to be supportive, so Daniel will be able to gain access to his trust fund and control of Grayson Global. When Huntley makes it clear he is unsure if he can trust her anymore, Victoria fires him. She also tells Daniel the truth about Charlotte but insinuates the pregnancy was forced by David Clarke.

In the episode "Reckoning" Victoria is set on delivering the evidence to the SEC about Conrad, after she finds out he is also going to be prosecuted for the murder-for-hire that killed David Clarke in prison. Shortly before leaving to go to Washington, D.C. to testify against Grayson Conrad, she finds out that Lydia is no longer willing to help her testify in the case. She convinces Lydia that this is her last chance for immunity in the trial. Victoria tries to console Daniel after finding out that Emily broke off their engagement, causing an argument. Conrad makes a last-ditch effort to convince Victoria not to go to Washington, D.C. to testify, telling her that this may be her last chance to save their family. Victoria goes against Conrad's wishes. Charlotte is in her bedroom at Grayson Manor watching the news, where she learns that Victoria's plane crashed. Lydia was killed, but Victoria fled before take-off, after getting a tip-off from a white-haired-man, who killed David Clarke and was responsible for the plane crash.

=== Season 2 ===
In "Destiny" just before Charlotte is taken back to rehab after failing a rigged drug test, she reveals to Emily that Victoria is alive and under government protection until they can rebuild the case against Conrad. She has secretly been in contact with Charlotte, as well as the white-haired man, who is hiding her and getting her and Charlotte fake identities so they can leave the country. She and Conrad later frame him for kidnapping her.

In "Intuition" Amanda has her baby shower at Grayson Manor. Amanda sneaks away and confronts Victoria about her handwriting on a sign-in sheet from the hospital where her mother was institutionalized. During the argument, Victoria reveals to Amanda that her mother faked her death because in a mental fit, she had tried to kill young Amanda. They get into a scuffle about the sign-in sheet which ends with Victoria accidentally pushing Amanda off the balcony. She is taken to a hospital, where she eventually recovers and gives birth, while Victoria burns the sheet.

In the episode "Victory" Emily comes across information that Victoria had a son 40 years ago, but gave him up for adoption. This leads Emily to send 11 black roses to Victoria, with a note attached, "I'll be wearing the 12th rose" and hires a masked man to wear the black rose. Victoria reveals to Conrad that she had an abortion years ago. She visits the orphanage where she gave up her son and learns he only came to look for her once, years ago, but the nun had kept Victoria's secret. Victoria leaves the orphanage satisfied that her biological son Patrick was placed in a good home and does not know her identity.

In the season 2 finale, Victoria becomes the First Lady of New York and in the closing scene, she answers the door at Grayson Manor and exclaims, "Patrick."

=== Season 3 ===
Throughout season 3 Victoria became closer to learning Emily's real identity and once learning she was Amanda Clarke she killed Emily's partner in her revenge plan and boyfriend Aiden instantly and placed his body in her Hamptons beach house. Emily went to extreme measures in the season 3 finale by forcing Victoria's former therapist Michelle Banks to place Victoria into solitary confinement at a mental health facility. The season ends with Emily walking away from a struggling Victoria as she repeatedly screams that Emily is Amanda Clarke.

=== Season 4 ===
In the fourth season premiere, Victoria escapes the mental health facility Emily placed her in, six months earlier. She returns and confronts Emily at her former residence Grayson Manor, which Emily now owns and tells Emily it's my turn for revenge. She leaves after a few minutes and is kidnapped by her ex-lover David Clarke.

She manages to turn him against his daughter, Amanda by not telling him who she really is. Eventually, he discovers the truth and begins plotting her death however, Amanda convinces him to just let it go.

Victoria eventually regains the Grayson fortune when Conrad's dad dies. She attempts to live a life without revenge. She is devastated when Margaux, who is pregnant with her grandchild, loses her baby. The loss causes Victoria to believe that Amanda is the root of everything wrong in her life and she decides to destroy her.

After Amanda reveals her true identity to the world, Victoria is regarded as a monster by everyone. She manages to trick Nolan's ex-wife, Louise into retrieving a flashdrive that contains evidence of all of Amanda's illegal activity.

Just when she is about to turn it over the evidence to the FBI, Amanda pickpockets it and destroys it. This pushes Victoria over the edge and she decides to end it once and for all. She breaks into Grayson Manor and turns on the gas. While sitting in her favorite chair from when she lived there, She turns on a lighter, causing the mansion to explode, killing her instantly and making it look like Amanda killed her.

In "Aftermath" a body is pulled from the rubble of Grayson Manor and identified as Victoria Grayson. Mason Treadwell reveals to Amanda that he helped Victoria with her plan to frame Amanda for murder. Mason sends Amanda a video message featuring Victoria saying that she killed herself so Amanda could suffer in prison greatly. Amanda is arrested for murder as Mason had planted Victoria's blood and hair in her car.

In "Plea" Amanda thinks that Victoria faked her death and planted someone else's body and switched the dental records to make it look like she is dead. She explains this to Ben and it shown in series of flashbacks; showing Victoria carrying out stages of her plan including planting the body of Mary Gaines in Grayson Manor. Ben goes to New Jersey to the house of the deceased Mary Gaines and discovers Victoria alive and well, but before he is able to leave and share the secret, he is killed by White Gold an assassin Margaux Lemarchal hired.

In "Two Graves", Victoria reveals that she had used her mother's body to a fake her death. It is also revealed in a flashback that Victoria's biological father was the man she thought was her stepfather. Near the end, Amanda and Victoria face each other down with Victoria having set up cameras to record her death so that Amanda would go down for it. However, before Amanda can fire, Victoria is fatally shot by David to spare Amanda having to commit murder. Before dying, Victoria shoots Amanda in the back, but she survives her wound. While David goes down for her murder, he is granted compassionate release due to his cancer and dies at home. Amanda has nightmares about the fact that she had to get a heart transplant to survive her wound but she does not know that the heart was Victoria's, whether or not the dream was real remain unknown.

== Reception ==
The character has received positive reviews by media outlets. Entertainment Weekly described Victoria as a "full-tilt silent-assassin mode." Actress Madeleine Stowe received a Golden Globe nomination for Best Actress in a TV Drama.
