= Revenge season 3 =

Revenge
- Season 3
- DVD cover
- Starring: Madeleine Stowe; Emily VanCamp; Gabriel Mann; Henry Czerny; Nick Wechsler; Josh Bowman; Barry Sloane; Christa B. Allen
- No. of episodes: 22

Release
- Original network: ABC
- Original release: September 29, 2013 – May 11, 2014

Season chronology
- ← Previous; Season 2 Next → Season 4

The third season of the ABC American television drama series Revenge premiered on September 29, 2013. Ashley Madekwe and Connor Paolo did not return as Ashley Davenport and Declan Porter, respectively, although Madekwe guest starred in the premiere to conclude her story. On July 12, 2013, it was confirmed that Justin Hartley would join the cast as Patrick Osbourne, Victoria Grayson's long lost son. This is also the first season not to have creator Mike Kelley as executive producer and showrunner. On May 3, 2013, Sunil Nayar was confirmed as Kelley's replacement. The premiere features a flashforward where Emily is shot and the first half of the season leads up to the shooting.

The season premiere was watched by 8.11 million viewers, achieving an adult 18–49 rating/share of 2.3/6.

== Plot ==
Six months after the end of the second season, Emily pursues a new strategy after revealing to Jack her true identity she is Amanda Clarke and to take down the Graysons once and for all – on her and Daniel's wedding day – as turned allies, new enemies, and ghosts from the past threaten to expose her. With an ultimatum from Jack and her complicated history with Aiden resurfacing, Emily must take extreme measures to ensure her plan goes off without a hitch. But Victoria has new reasons to destroy the girl next door, and with her long-lost son by her side, everyone – including Nolan – may become collateral damage in Emily and Victoria's vicious war.

== Cast and characters ==
=== Main cast ===
- Madeleine Stowe as Victoria Grayson
- Emily VanCamp as Emily Thorne
- Gabriel Mann as Nolan Ross
- Henry Czerny as Conrad Grayson
- Nick Wechsler as Jack Porter
- Josh Bowman as Daniel Grayson
- Barry Sloane as Aiden Mathis
- Christa B. Allen as Charlotte Clarke

=== Recurring cast ===
- Karine Vanasse as Margaux LeMarchal
- Justin Hartley as Patrick Osbourne
- Annabelle Stephenson as Sara Munello
- Henri Esteve as Javier Salgado
- Gail O'Grady as Stevie Grayson
- Olivier Martinez as Pascal LeMarchal
- Amber Valletta as Lydia Davis
- Stephanie Jacobsen as Niko Takeda
- James LeGros as Paul Whitley
- James Tupper as David Clarke
- Emily Alyn Lind as young Amanda Clarke

=== Guest cast ===
- Brett Cullen as Jimmy Brennan
- Steven Strait as Brooks
- Wade Williams as Officer Mostrowski
- Ashley Madekwe as Ashley Davenport
- Diogo Morgado as Jorge Velez
- Anil Kumar as Rohan Kamath
- Conor Leslie as Bianca
- Jayne Brook as Loretta Munello
- Brianna Brown as Lacey
- Ana Ortiz as Bizzy Preston
- Morgan Fairchild as Teresa
- Tim DeKay as Luke Gilliam
- Roger Bart as Mason Treadwell
- Daniel Zovatto as Gideon LeMarchal
- Amy Landecker as Michelle Banks
- Margarita Levieva as Emily Porter

== Episodes ==
No. overall	No. in season	Title	Directed by	Written by	Original release date	Prod. code	US viewers (millions)
45	1	"Fear"	Kenneth Fink	Sunil Nayar	September 29, 2013	301	8.11
The summer season kicks off in The Hamptons as Emily Thorne's course of revenge is renewed against an unexpected timeline. Nolan is released from prison, having proven his innocence through a failsafe in his Carrion project, which has exposed and destroyed the Initiative. Jack returns and gives Emily an ultimatum after her revelation of her true identity. Conrad is diagnosed with a disease, and Ashley falls into a trap set by Emily who is forced to use Victoria to help remove Ashley from her way. The return of Victoria Grayson's long-lost son, Patrick, brings changes and complications to the all–powerful family, particularly to Charlotte. And a glimpse into the future shows that the wedding of the century may lead to Emily's ultimate demise.
46	2	"Sin"	John Scott	Joe Fazzio	October 6, 2013	302	6.84
After being betrayed by Emily, Aiden returns on a mission to destroy her and decides to join forces with Victoria. Charlotte, who had moved out of her family home, comes back to help Conrad as he deals with his disease, until she finds out that he knew about the bomb that killed Declan. Emily's next target takes her into uncharted, sacred terrain now that former Grayson Global executive Paul Whitley has become a reformed clergyman. Victoria makes a bold move with Patrick by showing him to the rest of the family, including Emily. Aiden, who is trying to get Victoria on his side, goes to Emily's house to collect proof of what she has been doing. Margaux presents Daniel with an intriguing proposal.
47	3	"Confession"	Matt Earl Beesley	Sallie Patrick	October 13, 2013	303	6.00
With a new lease on life, Nolan throws a housewarming party worthy of The Hampton's elite, but an unexpected guest (Aiden) appears, which leads to a showdown that sends shockwaves through the community. Emily decides to use Father Paul to persuade Conrad to confess all about her father's death. Daniel starts to feel nervous about Emily when Victoria reveals that Emily bought a house for Nolan. Margaux decides to go to Nolan's party to find out more about him and gives him an opportunity to clear his reputation. It is revealed that Aiden is still on Emily's side and that their plan is working.
48	4	"Mercy"	J. Miller Tobin	Karin Gist	October 20, 2013	304	6.16
Conrad decides to confess his sins about David Clarke, but before he can he is involved in a car crash which kills Father Paul. When Emily's biggest takedown yet crashes and burns, she must rely on help from an unlikely source to investigate what went wrong. Nolan goes to Jacksonville, Florida to find information about Patrick's past from his former wife. To protect her own future, Victoria buys a gallery to secure her independence. Conrad finds out that he does not have a disease and reveals it to the others. Nolan and Patrick get closer.
49	5	"Control"	Allison Liddi-Brown	Ted Sullivan	October 27, 2013	305	5.71
After learning that Emily still has feelings for Jack, and that Jack knows about her true identity, Aiden frames Jack for Conrad's car crash. Later, Aiden warns Jack and tells him to leave the city to protect himself and his son. Emily spends time with Jack trying to save him from the Graysons, which makes Daniel suspicious. Nolan tries to convince Patrick to give him a second chance after Patrick learns that Nolan dug into his past. At the Voulez magazine launch party, Daniel tells Emily that he can't marry her, leaving Emily vulnerable and ready to do whatever it takes to stop him. Aiden reveals that Jack caused Conrad's car crash.
50	6	"Dissolution"	Bobby Roth	Gretchen J. Berg & Aaron Harberts	November 3, 2013	306	6.33
When she finds out about Nolan and Patrick's relationship, Emily tells Nolan to stay far away from him. Daniel and Charlotte, who has decided to help Jack in the Stowaway, bump into his former girlfriend — Sara. Roadblocks seem to be mounting for Emily as Daniel’s attention is focused elsewhere. When Conrad reveals that Grayson Manor has been sold, Emily sticks to the plan and does her best to keep it their property. Two of the most important people in Emily’s life, Jack and Nolan, turning on her leads Emily to do something very uncharacteristic. Nolan is forced to end his relationship with Patrick because of his recent actions.
51	7	"Resurgence"	John Scott	Christopher Fife	November 10, 2013	307	5.49
Charlotte helps Sara by offering her job at the Stowaway. Conrad hires Bizzy Preston, a famed party–girl turned PR mastermind, in an attempt to restore the Grayson family name. Emily goes to Nolan to ask about Bizzy and he reveals he had some troubles with her in the past. Although he enjoys Margaux's company, Jack has issues moving on. Charlotte plans to sabotage Daniel and Emily's wedding by using Sara. Learning that Bizzy is going to have a meeting with both Victoria and Emily, Nolan starts a revenge–agenda of his own. Willing to change, Jack moves on and kisses Margaux.
52	8	"Secrecy"	Colin Bucksey	Sallie Patrick & JaSheika James	November 17, 2013	308	5.81
Victoria throws Daniel and Emily a wedding shower with a plan to break them apart, using Sara by any means necessary. Daniel struggles with his returning feelings for Sara, who, after a confrontation with Emily, is doubting her actions and unsure if she can help Victoria. Conrad invites Daniel for a Grayson rite of passage — a place where he can spend time with his paramours after the wedding. Charlotte meets Aiden to seek his help after she has lost her phone and is being blackmailed. At the wedding shower, Victoria invites Emily's former husband, but her plans are quickly thwarted when Emily reveals the true reason for their marriage. In order to keep him onside, Emily lies to Daniel that she is pregnant, while Margaux, searching for information about Conrad, meets the returning Lydia Davis.
53	9	"Surrender"	Jennifer Getzinger	Joe Fazzio	December 8, 2013	309	6.04
As preparation for the wedding of the century begins, Emily's plan is working perfectly. Margaux is even more interested and uses Lydia to find some information about the David Clarke incident. Aiden informs Margaux that Lydia had a meeting with Conrad which leads to the end of their arrangement. Daniel has a hard time letting go of his feelings for Sara, which makes Emily desperate to get him on her side. After revealing to Victoria that she's pregnant, Emily lies to Daniel that his mother was the one spreading the news on the internet, causing a fight between the two. In the final scene, Victoria informs Emily that she will not be attending the wedding.
54	10	"Exodus"	Kenneth Fink	Sunil Nayar & Karin Gist	December 15, 2013	310	6.22
The wedding of the century arrives and Emily's plan is working to perfection. Jack gets emotional when Emily goes to say goodbye to him and reveals that Amanda died in her arms. When Emily asks Conrad to make Victoria come to the wedding, Conrad uses Patrick to manipulate her, leaving Victoria with no other choice. In addition, Lydia blackmails Emily into giving her house back. Hearing that Patrick is back, Nolan uses the accident with Father Paul to get Patrick away from Victoria in order to buy Emily some time. Conrad decides to reconcile his relationship with Lydia and announces it after the wedding. At the yacht, Lydia shows Victoria the photo from 2003 when Emily served as a waitress at a Grayson party. When Victoria confronts Emily, Aiden is able to get Victoria away so Emily can finish the plan, but Daniel overhears everything. A vengeful, angry, and drunk Daniel shoots Emily and throws the gun in the water. When Aiden and Jack, not knowing the events that have occurred on the yacht, try to find Emily back on the shore, they find only her bloody wedding dress. At Nolan's house, Patrick stumbles upon a remote that reveals the safe containing Emily's infinity box, although it is not shown if he opens it.
55	11	"Homecoming"	Matt Earl Beesley	Ted Sullivan	January 5, 2014	311	6.69
After Emily is shot by Daniel, she is able to survive and is later hospitalized. She is visited by Daniel but fails to remember anything. Margaux has possession of photos from the events on the yacht. Jack gets the photos and sends them to Nolan so he can copy them. Patrick goes to Nolan's house and finds out about the infinity box. It is revealed that Emily suffers from amnesia after Aiden tries to rescue her. Daniel reveals to Victoria that he shot Emily at the yacht, which makes Victoria put an ultimatum to Conrad — choose between Daniel or Lydia's innocence. When Charlotte tries to help Emily remember, Emily reveals to Charlotte that David Clarke is her (Emily's) father, which leaves Charlotte in an uncomfortable situation. Conrad decides to leave Lydia in order to save Daniel from criminal charges. Patrick visits Victoria and tells her about the infinity box. In the final scene, when Jack visits Emily she is able to remember that Daniel shot her.
56	12	"Endurance"	Sanford Bookstaver	Sallie Patrick	January 12, 2014	312	5.71
Victoria has Emily discharged to Grayson Manor to keep an eye on her as her memories begin to return. Later, just as Emily is ready to give up her revenge scheme, she discovers that due to her injuries she will never conceive children, which renews her vendetta and makes her even more determined. She then breaks up with Aiden, who finds comfort with Niko — Takeda's daughter. Patrick, in an attempt to prove his loyalty to Victoria, steals the infinity box. Nolan, however, has replaced it with fake information to keep Emily's identity hidden by making her appear to be a grifter. Emily publicly announces that Lydia shot her as leverage to stay in the Grayson family, but the tension between her and Daniel is growing.
57	13	"Hatred"	John Terlesky	Gretchen J. Berg & Aaron Harberts	January 19, 2014	313	5.37
Daniel reconciles his relationship with Sara. Nolan confronts Patrick about his assault and gives him information about his father, leading Patrick to go to Victoria for answers. Emily learns about Aiden and Niko's relationship and when she blacks out she finds herself with Aiden. After moving out of Grayson Manor, Conrad gets revenge over Daniel in his own way. Emily invites Sara's mother who does the impossible to break them apart, leaving Daniel desperate once again. When Emily again blacks out she wakes up in a hotel bedroom, where Conrad walks in and hints that they slept together. A vengeful Niko is sent to Moscow, Russia to kill the man who she believes killed her father, after Nolan falsifies evidence to protect Aiden. While preparing to leave, Niko finds her father's katana and realizes that Aiden is the true killer. Conrad's ex-wife — Stevie Grayson — returns.
58	14	"Payback"	Romeo Tirone	Sunil Nayar & Christopher Fife	March 9, 2014	314	6.60
Emily tries to get to the bottom of why she is having blackouts, and, in the process, discovers that she asked for a divorce and made alliances with Conrad and Stevie. Daniel throws a nineteenth birthday party for Charlotte. After Patrick sets the gallery ablaze, he hires his biological father, who doesn't recognize him or Victoria, to get the electricity fixed, as part of a plan to kill him. While Margaux and Jack go house hunting, Niko finds out that Aiden killed her father and devises a plan for revenge, however Emily is able to change her mind. Stevie confronts Jack and announces that she is his mother.
59	15	"Struggle"	Christopher Misiano	Michael J. Cinquemani	March 16, 2014	315	6.24
Aiden helps Emily face her anger towards her father in order to overcome her blackouts and find the reason behind them. After learning the truth about Patrick's father, Nolan conspires with Victoria to send him away from the Hamptons to protect him and secure his life for the future. Daniel hires a detective to spy on Emily, who later shocks him by showing him a picture of Aiden and Emily kissing. Stevie parleys with Victoria over Grayson Manor and explains her absence to Jack, who decides to give her a second chance, and the two finally begin to trust each other. Emily realizes that Stevie visited her father in prison and vows to uncover her secrets.
60	16	"Disgrace"	Matt Shakman	Shannon Goss	March 23, 2014	316	5.66
After confronting Emily with the photos of her kissing Aiden, Daniel demands a divorce, but when she refuses a large settlement, Victoria begins to question her true motives. At the opera, when news of Emily's fake pregnancy is leaked, Victoria uses this to publicly shame her. However, it is later revealed Emily herself leaked the news in order to make the Graysons believe they have the upper hand. Nolan gets a new house guest in the form of his recently released hacker acquaintance. When Pascal is revealed to be involved with David Clarke's case, Jack pledges to help Emily so long as Margaux is protected. Conrad pursues a business merger with Pascal by tempting him with the one thing he has long desired – Victoria.
61	17	"Addiction"	Tara Nicole Weyr	Joe Fazzio	March 30, 2014	317	5.25
Emily hosts a charity casino night in an attempt to secure Pascal as an ally, however he proves his loyalty to Victoria by attempting to bug their conversation. After an intimate conversation with Conrad about the end of their marriage, Stevie's sobriety is tested. Daniel asks Charlotte to help him attack Emily's friends to which she agrees so long as Jack is protected. Daniel goes against his word by trying to turn Margaux against Jack by leading her to believe he has feelings for Emily. Nolan's friend Javier makes a play for Charlotte and after a plea from Emily, Aiden returns with information that connects his father to Pascal.
62	18	"Blood"	Wendey Stanzler	Karin Gist	April 6, 2014	318	5.16
Continuing her investigation into Emily, Victoria pays a visit to Mason Treadwell who informs her that she will need to secure his release before he reveals any secrets. Stevie later visits Mason with a counter-offer on behalf of Emily but he refuses. Later, it appears that Mason is poisoned and declared dead, however this is revealed to be part of Emily's plan to secure his continued silence. Jack decides to take Stevie home to LA after news of Mason's death breaks her sobriety. Emily and Aiden visit his mother in the hopes of shedding light on his father's connection to Pascal. Daniel moves forward with his plan against Emily by further driving a wedge between Jack and Margaux as well as rousing Charlotte's suspicions about Jack's loyalty. Conrad declares war against Pascal's business.
63	19	"Allegiance"	Jennifer Wilkinson	Ted Sullivan	April 13, 2014	319	5.26
When Luke, a former employee of Grayson Global, returns to town, Emily enlists Jack's help to take him down. In doing so, she retrieves evidence implicating Conrad in her father's case but also confirms Victoria's suspicions that she is out to avenge David Clarke. Aiden tracks down Oscar Chapman and learns that his father was framed and murdered by Pascal. Although Oscar agrees to come forward, Pascal kills him before he can. Conrad continues to work against Pascal and tries to recruit Aiden. Charlotte uses her sway over Javier to get him to sign a deal with Daniel and Margaux, leading Jack to end his relationship with the latter and Nolan to declare war on Daniel.
64	20	"Revolution"	Christine Moore	Sunil Nayar & Michael J. Cinquemani	April 27, 2014	320	5.19
After he proposes to Victoria, Emily abducts Pascal and claims to be Agent Rebecca Stone of Homeland Security. She tells him that she has been building a case against the Graysons and forces him to help her. He agrees to wear a wire to secure a confession from Conrad in exchange for protection for Victoria. Later, after suggesting they leave the country, Victoria finds a card for Agent Stone and confides to Daniel that Pascal may be talking to the Feds. Daniel, in turn, tells his father. At the launch for MyClone, Pascal names Margaux as his successor. Before she can stop him, Emily witnesses Conrad push Pascal into a helicopter propeller. He forces the pilot to corroborate that it was an accident which devastates Victoria. Charlotte goes to Jack for help when she receives letters that appear to be written by her father David Clarke. Later, after giving up hope, she is abducted on the beach.
65	21	"Impetus"	J. Miller Tobin	Gretchen J. Berg & Aaron Harberts	May 4, 2014	321	4.98
It is revealed that Emily and Aiden kidnapped Charlotte in order to force a confession from Conrad and Victoria. They agree to hold a press conference, as Conrad believes he has written a speech that will allow them to claim duress, and therefore be unworthy of evidence in court. When Javier comes looking for Charlotte, Jack becomes worried and eventually walks into Emily's plan. Although he is hesitant to take part, Aiden convinces him to help by telling him that he won't get Amanda back until her mission is completed. He later releases Charlotte, who confronts Conrad on his sins about Flight 197 and the framing of David Clarke. Finally having enough, Conrad yells at Charlotte and confesses everything to her, which is caught on a live cam on Charlotte, with both unaware. With Conrad exposed, the FBI arrests him. Daniel shows the police an image of a figure in the stairwell at the time of Pascal's death and tells the police it was Emily. She is detained but Nolan manages to cover her tracks. Victoria uses DNA from Jack's son and Charlotte to confirm her suspicions about Emily; that she is Amanda Clarke. Emily visits Conrad in jail and reveals she is the one behind it all. When asked about Victoria, Emily assures him that she's not done yet.
66	22	"Execution"	Kenneth Fink	Sunil Nayar & Joe Fazzio	May 11, 2014	322	4.87
In this final showdown, Victoria has discovered the truth about Emily and plans to get revenge against her for Pascal's death. Daniel is framed for the death of a young girl by Margaux's brother, who wishes to use the framing as leverage to take over Daniel's position. Charlotte recognizes that Jack was involved in her kidnapping and has the authorities arrest him. Conrad is denied bail and returned to jail, but is released due to a mysterious benefactor. However, on his apparent road to freedom, his escape ride turns out to be none other than David Clarke, who promptly confronts a stunned Conrad and kills him. Aiden is killed when he is unwittingly lured into a trap set by Victoria. Angered, Emily retaliates by knocking out Victoria and having her committed to a mental health facility, fully completing her revenge.

== Ratings ==
No. in series	No. in season	Title	Air date	Rating/share (18–49)	Viewers (millions)	DVR (18–49)	DVR Viewers (millions)	Total (18–49)	Total viewers (millions)
45	1	"Fear"	September 29, 2013	2.3/6	8.11	1.1	2.94	3.5	11.05
46	2	"Sin"	October 6, 2013	1.9/5	6.84	1.0	2.60	2.9	9.44
47	3	"Confession"	October 13, 2013	1.6/4	6.00	—N/a	2.74	2.8	8.74
48	4	"Mercy"	October 20, 2013	1.5/4	6.16	—N/a	2.60	2.5	8.76
49	5	"Control"	October 27, 2013	1.4/3	5.71	1.1	2.68	2.5	8.39
50	6	"Dissolution"	November 3, 2013	1.7/4	6.33	1.0	2.46	2.7	8.79
51	7	"Resurgence"	November 10, 2013	1.3/3	5.49	—N/a	—N/a	—N/a	—N/a
52	8	"Secrecy"	November 17, 2013	1.5/4	5.81	1.0	—N/a	2.5	—N/a
53	9	"Surrender"	December 8, 2013	1.6/4	6.04	0.9	2.53	2.5	8.57
54	10	"Exodus"	December 15, 2013	1.5/4	6.22	1.0	2.33	2.5	8.55
55	11	"Homecoming"	January 5, 2014	1.8/4	6.69	—N/a	—N/a	2.6	9.22
56	12	"Endurance"	January 12, 2014	1.6/4	5.71	—N/a	—N/a	—N/a	—N/a
57	13	"Hatred"	January 19, 2014	1.3/3	5.37	—N/a	—N/a	—N/a	7.85
58	14	"Payback"	March 9, 2014	1.9/5	6.60	—N/a	—N/a	—N/a	—N/a
59	15	"Struggle"	March 16, 2014	1.7/5	6.24	—N/a	—N/a	—N/a	—N/a
60	16	"Disgrace"	March 23, 2014	1.5/5	5.66	—N/a	—N/a	—N/a	—N/a
61	17	"Addiction"	March 30, 2014	1.4/4	5.25	—N/a	—N/a	—N/a	—N/a
62	18	"Blood"	April 6, 2014	1.3/3	5.16	—N/a	—N/a	—N/a	—N/a
63	19	"Allegiance"	April 13, 2014	1.3/4	5.26	—N/a	—N/a	—N/a	—N/a
64	20	"Revolution"	April 27, 2014	1.3/4	5.19	—N/a	—N/a	—N/a	—N/a
65	21	"Impetus"	May 4, 2014	1.3/4	4.98	—N/a	—N/a	—N/a	—N/a
66	22	"Execution"	May 11, 2014	1.4/4	4.87	—N/a	—N/a	—N/a	—N/a
