= Intrigue (Revenge) =

- Revenge episode
- Victoria (Stowe) and Tyler (Holmes)
- Episode no.: Season 1 Episode 6
- Directed by: Tim Hunter
- Written by: Dan Dworkin and Jay Beattie
- Original air date: October 26, 2011
- Running time: 42 minutes

Guest appearances
- Amber Valletta as Lydia Davis; Max Martini as Frank Stevens; Ashton Holmes as Tyler Barrol; James Tupper as David Clarke; Emily Alyn Lind as Amanda Clarke; Ed Corbin as Bull; Bodie Newcomb as Fisherman; Gary Kraus as Teddy

Episode chronology
← Previous "Guilt"	Next → "Charade"
- Revenge (season 1)

Intrigue is the sixth episode in the first season of the American darma television series Revenge. It aired on ABC on October 26, 2011, and was written by Dan Dworkin and Jay Beattie and directed by Tim Hunter.

== Plot ==
On July 4, a celebration by the Grayson's family has long been legendary, but the celebration this year will be one to remember in a bad way. A videotape depicting Frank (Max Martini) killing Lydia Davis (Amber Valletta) at her penthouse destroys Frank's credibility to the Graysons.

Frank is not going to surrender without a fight, and it does not bode well for Emily Thorne (Emily VanCamp) & Nolan Ross' (Gabriel Mann) plans. Meanwhile, tensions between Emily and Tyler (Ashton Holmes) reach an all-time high, putting Daniel Grayson (Josh Bowman) into a difficult position, and Jack (Nick Wechsler) & Declan (Connor Paolo) take bold steps in pursuing Emily and Charlotte (Christa B. Allen).

== Production ==
The episode was co-written by Dan Dworkin and Jay Beattie, while Mad Men veteran Tim Hunter directed it.

== Reception ==
=== Ratings ===
The episode watched byn8.72 million viewers and scored a 2.7 rating/7% share in the 18-49 demographics, making it Revenge the highest-rated program in its time slot, beating CSI: Crime Scene Investigation and Prime Suspect.
