= Pilot (Revenge) =

- Revenge episode
- Episode no.: Season 1 Episode 1
- Directed by: Phillip Noyce
- Written by: Mike Kelley
- Original air date: September 21, 2011
- Running time: 40 minutes

Guest appearances
- Amber Valletta as Lydia Davis; James Tupper as David Clarke; Emily Alyn Lind as Young Amanda Clarke; Brian Goodman as Carl Porter

Episode chronology
← Previous —	Next → "Trust"
- Revenge (season 1)

"Pilot" is the pilot episode of the American drama television series Revenge. It aired on ABC on September 21, 2011, and was written by Mike Kelley and directed by Phillip Noyce.

== Plot ==
In the series premiere, Emily Thorne (Emily VanCamp) returns to the Hamptons, where she and her father (James Tupper) spent each summer before his arrest. She rents the house she once shared with her late father, now owned by Lydia Davis (Amber Valletta). When Emily begins to put her plan for revenge into action, she gets sidetracked by an old friend, a potential new romance, and an unwanted ally. She soon starts to learn everyone's hidden secrets, and makes it her goal to get revenge on those who destroyed her family.

The series starts with a man being shot, and falling lifelessly onto the beach while a party is going on in the background. The party celebrates Emily's engagement to Daniel Grayson (Joshua Bowman). Two more shots are fired into the man's back, but no one at the party can hear the shots, because fireworks are going off. Emily is seen in an elegant red dress wiping sand off her hand. She informs the party planner, her friend Ashley (Ashley Madekwe), that Daniel is walking on the beach because they had an argument. Daniel's mother, Victoria (Madeleine Stowe), makes a passionate speech about Emily and her engagement to Daniel. She then privately demands that Emily tell her of her son's whereabouts. Declan (Connor Paolo) and Charlotte (Christa B. Allen), Daniel's sister, find who they presume to be Daniel, dead on the beach. The scene then flashes back to five months earlier.

Emily has returned to the Hamptons and is renting the beach house she once shared with her father, David Clarke. Emily's realtor says that the beach house now belongs to Lydia and Michael Davis, who are currently in a divorce. Michael left Lydia for a woman half Lydia's age, the realtor adds. Emily looks out at the water and sees a carving in the porch ledge. She recognizes it as double infinity, and flashes back to when she and her father played on the porch with sand. Her father tells her that he loves her "infinity", drawing the infinity symbol in the sand, "times infinity", drawing the symbol again so it interlocks with the first. The realtor also points out that the Graysons live next door, and Emily says she'll take the house. As Emily is moving in, Victoria's son, Daniel, comes home from Harvard Business School, and his sister, Charlotte, strikes up a relationship with Jack Porter's (Nick Wechsler) brother, Declan, at their tavern.

Nolan Ross (Gabriel Mann) meets up with Jack and offers to buy his boat named "Amanda" for a large sum. Jack refuses because he is sailing to Haiti in a week to help with the earthquake. A bank representative comes by the tavern owned by Jack and Declan's father (Brian Goodman) to tell him that the bank will foreclose on the tavern if the loan is not paid off by the end of the month.

Victoria announces that she will host a charity event on her large boat and will auction a piece of art from her private collection. She chooses to auction off a Manet painting instead of a van Gogh, because her best friend Lydia gave her the van Gogh. Lydia reveals quietly to Victoria that her ex-husband is threatening to put the beach house on the market. Lydia runs into Emily on the beach, and Emily tells her that she is renting the beach house that Lydia and her husband shared. Lydia officially welcomes Emily to the Hamptons.

Emily has flashbacks when she watches a video of a trial in 1995 that shows Lydia, her father's administrator, testifying falsely against her father. David was falsely accused of being responsible for the crash of Flight 197. Emily remembers her father being arrested by FBI agents when she was young, after which she was removed from her father's care.

Emily secretly takes pictures of Lydia having an affair with Victoria's husband, Conrad (Henry Czerny). She goes to the South Fork Inn, where Conrad and Lydia have secretly chosen to meet, and they have a sexual affair. After sleeping with Lydia and eating soup, Conrad has painful stomach pains and is in need of medical attention. As he is rushed to the hospital, Emily asks Lydia if Conrad is her husband and offers her a ride to the hospital. Lydia declines and flees the scene. Emily then runs into Jack Porter and his dog Sammy. She recognizes Jack, and leaves in a rush.

Victoria rushes to the hospital thinking that Conrad is in a serious condition. The hospital tells Victoria that Conrad should not eat spicy things at the South Fork Inn, because they upset his stomach. Victoria questions this; she thought that Conrad had gone golfing, but the South Fork Inn is 30 minutes in the opposite direction from the golf course. Victoria then notices a South Fork Inn robe in the hospital bed and fiercely says "Don't do it again" to her husband's face.

Emily attends the Memorial Day charity party hosted by Victoria, and her friend, the party planner Ashley, introduces Emily to Victoria. Emily mentions her meeting with Conrad and Lydia at the South Fork Inn, the previous day, in front of Victoria. Victoria realizes that Lydia is sleeping with her husband. Victoria then makes a beautiful speech and lets the crowd know that Lydia has won the art auction. However, Victoria sends Lydia home with the van Gogh "as a reminder of the friendship they shared." As Lydia leaves the party, Victoria turns her eyes and attention towards Emily. Emily has a flashback of the last time that Victoria looked at her straight in the eyes when she was a child. As FBI agents forcefully removed Emily from her father's care, she gets a glimpse of Conrad and Victoria Grayson, the very people who destroyed her father and her family.

Emily strikes up a romance with Daniel and flirts with him throughout the rest of the party. Nolan Ross, who was at the charity party recording the entire event, recognizes Emily Thorne as Amanda Clarke. He goes to her house and offers to help her seek vengeance on the people who destroyed her and her father's lives. She refuses his help and says that Amanda Clarke no longer exists. Emily then flashes back to her 18th birthday when Nolan came to pick her up from a detention center. He told Amanda that her father had died, and that he had been falsely accused and did not have anything to do with the crash of Flight 197. Nolan also said that her father was the only person who invested in his company in its early stages, and now that she is 18 years old she is officially a 49% owner of his company. Nolan hands her a box, with the double infinity mark carved on the top, that her father left for her and a diary he wrote. Emily's father, in his letters and diaries, asks her to forgive those who wronged her and live a life full of happiness. However, she refuses and chooses to take revenge on those who destroyed her family.

Victoria confronts Conrad about the affair, and he says that he gave up everything once to show how much he cared about her. Victoria rebukes him, saying that she returned the favor and destroyed a man, but Conrad says that that was all her idea. Conrad continues and states that Victoria did what she did to save herself as much as he did. Victoria fires back and says it is a compromise she is constantly reminded of everyday. Conrad concludes the argument that Victoria got plenty in the bargain.

Emily goes out to the boat deck of the beach house and holds a watch she found in the box that reads, "David, until forever, Victoria." Victoria watches Emily from her balcony, then calls her husband's head of security to investigate Emily Thorne.

A flashback reveals that Emily posed as a maid at the South Fork Inn earlier and spiked Conrad's soup, causing him to end up in the hospital.

== Production ==
"Pilot" was written by series creator Mike Kelley and directed by Salt director Phillip Noyce. It was filmed in North Carolina between March–April 2011.

== Reception ==
=== Ratings ===
The pilot episode earned a 3.3 rating among adults aged 18–49, with 10.02 million viewers. It came in second to CSI: Crime Scene Investigation in viewers in the 10pm time slot (CSI got 12.74 million viewers), and ahead of Law & Order: Special Victims Unit. It was the highest-viewed scripted telecast in that hour for ABC since the premiere of Eastwick two years earlier.

In Canada, the pilot episode was watched by 523,000 viewers.

=== Critical reception ===
The pilot episode was met with positive reviews, with a weighted average score of 66 out of 100 based on 26 reviews on Metacritic, indicating "generally favorable reviews". Gavin Hetherington of SpoilerTV wrote a reflexive piece on "Pilot" 5 years after it aired and 1 year after the show ended, saying "it set the marvellous stage to a truly delicious premiere season". He further commented, "what's brilliant about the series premiere is that it makes you crave all the answers. In some regards, it's like wanting to know who A is in Pretty Little Liars."
