= Duplicity (Revenge) =

- Revenge episode
- Episode no.: Season 1 Episode 4
- Directed by: Matt Shakman
- Written by: Wendy Calhoun
- Original air date: October 12, 2011
- Running time: 42 minutes

Guest appearances
- Amy Landecker as Dr. Michelle Banks; Max Martini as Frank Stevens; Ashton Holmes as Tyler Barrol; James Tupper as David Clarke; Cassius Willis as Detective Robert Gunther; Candace Kita as Rosemary Cabot; Leslie Stevens as Miriam; Amber Valletta as Lydia Davis

Episode chronology
← Previous "Betrayal"	Next → "Guilt"
- Revenge (season 1)

"Duplicity" is the fourth episode of the first season of the American drama television series Revenge. It aired on ABC on October 12, 2011, was written by Wendy Calhoun and directed by Matt Shakman.

== Plot ==
Emily Thorne (Emily VanCamp) moves on to her next target, Dr. Michelle Banks (Amy Landecker), a psychiatrist who is responsible for institutionalizing her while her father (James Tupper) was in prison.

The episode starts with Emily sitting in Dr. Banks office. Emily has been seeing Dr Banks for her 'emotional trauma', which she uses as a disguise to get friendlier with Dr Banks. After the therapy sessions we see that Dr Banks records all her sessions and looks back on them after the session to make notes about the client.

The episode then skips to Emily, Daniel Grayson (Josh Bowman), Tyler (Ashton Holmes) and Ashley playing a tennis match, Tyler and Ashley against Emily and Daniel. Emily and Daniel win. After the match Tyler suggests having lunch but Ashley refuses as she has to help Victoria plan the Mother Daughter luncheon.

Daniel sees Emily having dinner with Jack Porter (Nick Wechsler). Heartbroken, he goes on a drinking binge with Tyler (Ashton Holmes). Charlotte Grayson (Christa B. Allen) and Declan Porter (Connor Paolo) get to know each other more and Conrad Grayson (Henry Czerny) pays Lydia Davis (Amber Valletta) a secret visit.

Emily goes to the doctor Michelle Banks, who sent her to prison. She becomes her next victim, when Emily causes videos of her private therapy sessions with Victoria Grayson (Madeleine Stowe) and others to be aired at a luncheon hosted by Victoria.

She then attacks Banks and while she is unconscious, traps her in a loading tank with nothing but a single bed. This is exactly how Emily's room was set up when Michelle institutionalised her and segregated her from the world and her father as a child.

== Production ==
The episode was written by producer Wendy Calhoun, and directed by It's Always Sunny in Philadelphia veteran Matt Shakman.

== Promotion ==
ABC made a site www.hamptonsexposed.com, that hosts the records of Dr. Michelle Banks.

== Reception ==
=== Ratings ===
The episode was watched by 7.94 million viewers and scored a 2.7 rating/7% share in 18-49 demographic, making it Revenge the highest-rated show in its timeslot, beating CSI: Crime Scene Investigation and Law & Order: Special Victims Unit.
