= Charade (Revenge) =

- Revenge episode
- Frank (Max Martini) and Amanda (Margarita Levieva)
- Episode no.: Season 1 Episode 7
- Directed by: Sanford Bookstaver
- Written by: Mark B. Perry and Joe Fazzio
- Original air date: November 2, 2011
- Running time: 42 minutes

Guest appearances
- CCH Pounder as Warden Stiles; Margarita Levieva as Emily Thorne/Amanda Clarke; Amber Valletta as Lydia Davis; Max Martini as Frank Stevens; Ashton Holmes as Tyler Barrol; James Tupper as David Clarke; Emily Alyn Lind as Amanda Clarke; Jamal Duff as Big Ed; Alicia Coppola as Melissa Andetson; Tracey Rooney as Nurse

Episode chronology
← Previous "Intrigue"	Next → "Treachery"
- Revenge (season 1)

"Charade" is the seventh episode in the first season of the American drama television series Revenge. It aired on ABC on November 2, 2011, and was co-written by Mark B. Perry and Joe Fazzio and directed by Sanford Bookstaver.

== Plot ==
The Graysons celebrate their 25th wedding anniversary. In past years they had thrown elaborate parties, but given recent events Victoria (Madeleine Stowe) and Conrad Grayson (Henry Czerny) opt to keep the celebration limited to a quiet dinner party. Meanwhile, Conrad and Victoria's marriage continues to struggle as Victoria continues to flash back to her betrayal of David Clarke (James Tupper) feeling immense guilt, while Conrad remains by Lydia Davis' (Amber Valletta) bedside, despite his declarations that he still loves Victoria. Frank (Max Martini) continues to look into Emily Thorne's (Emily VanCamp) past, leading to a brief confrontation at her home, that leads Emily to call for help in the form of her former warden (CCH Pounder). Despite the warden's attempts to steer Frank away, he soon discovers that "Emily Thorne" is actually the name of Amanda's former cellmate (Margarita Levieva) in jail. The two later exchanged names so Amanda/Emily could seek revenge on those who wronged her father. Frank finds the impostor Amanda at a strip club. After some talking, the fake Amanda kills Frank with a tire iron, just as he is about to expose Emily to Victoria over the phone.

Emily and Daniel's (Josh Bowman) romance continues to be threatened by Daniel's Harvard friend, Tyler (Ashton Holmes). Emily enlists Nolan Ross' (Gabriel Mann) help in taking down Tyler, now trusting him as an ally. Nolan discovers that Tyler's family went bankrupt and he has become something of a con man in order to restore the wealth his family once had. Tyler seduces Nolan in an effort to keep him from exposing his lies to the Graysons, but Nolan later reveals he videotaped the tryst as part of his plot to ruin Tyler.

The Graysons' ill-fated dinner takes place with Charlotte Grayson (Christa B. Allen) bringing Declan Porter (Connor Paolo) to the party, unannounced. During the rather shrill meal, Conrad openly degrades Daniel for working at the Porter's bar, calling it a "dive." This infuriates Declan, and he verbally lashes out at the Graysons. He calls Emily out on her relationship with Jack Porter (Nick Wechsler), revealing to Daniel that she had come by the bar to give Jack a gift. Emily insists that it was just to thank Jack for fixing the porch swing. Tyler, detained by Nolan, misses the entire meal, much to Ashley's (Ashley Madekwe) dismay. After a brief confrontation over their relationship, Emily and Daniel both confess that they are falling in love with each other. Declan and Charlotte reconcile and she admits she brought Declan to the dinner uninvited as a way to spite her mother. Victoria and Conrad have an explosive argument. She throws him out and shares a heartfelt conversation with Daniel.

Tyler attempts to keep Ashley with him as their relationship begins to come apart. He reveals his past and plot to her, which allows her to realize they are more alike than she originally thought. Conrad sits with Lydia at the hospital as she awakens from her coma. The fake Amanda arrives at Emily's door. As they reunite, she reveals to her former cellmate that Frank found out their secret, but she "took care of him." Frank's (presumably dead) body is shown on the side of a road.

== Production ==
The episode was co-written by Mark B. Perry and former associate producer Joe Fazzio, while House M.D. veteran, Sanford Bookstaver, directed.

== Reception ==
=== Ratings ===
The episode was watched by 8.58 million viewers and scored a 3.0 rating/8% share in the 18-49 demographics, making it Revenge the highest-rated program in its timeslot, beating CSI: Crime Scene Investigation and Law & Order: Special Victims Unit.
