= Betrayal (Revenge) =

- Revenge episode
- Victoria Grayson (Stowe)
- Episode no.: Season 1 Episode 3
- Directed by: Matt Earl Beesley
- Written by: Salvatore Stabile
- Original air date: October 5, 2011
- Running time: 42 minutes

Guest appearances
- Yancey Arias as Senator Tom Kingsley; Nicole Pulliam as Diane Kingsly; Max Martini as Frank Stevens; Ashton Holmes as Tyler Barrol; Robbie Amell as Adam Connor; James Tupper as David Clarke; Brandon P. Bell as Steven Gordon; Kim Swennen as Erin; Ben Turner Dixon as Patrick

Episode chronology
← Previous "Trust"	Next → "Duplicity"
- Revenge (season 1)

"Betrayal" is the third episode of the first season of the American drama television series Revenge. It aired on ABC on October 5, 2011, and was written by Salvatore Stabile and directed by Matt Earl Beesley.

== Plot ==
With the help of Nolan Ross (Gabriel Mann), Emily Thorne (Emily VanCamp) sets her sights on federal prosecutor Tom Kingsley (Yancey Arias), now a state senator, who put her father (James Tupper) in prison. Daniel (Josh Bowman) finds he cannot resist Emily; she orchestrates another date on which Daniel is confronted by the brother of his ex-girlfriend who was involved in his car accident.

Victoria (Madeleine Stowe) learns more about Emily, and her suspicions increase. Victoria reflects on time when she was in love with David Clarke (Tupper) and saw that he would certainly be convicted. She had told Kingsley she had evidence exonerating him, which Kingsley ignored when Conrad (Henry Czerny) offered to support his political ambitions.

Kingsley receives two video e-mails showing him with his ex-mistress Erin (Kim Swennen), to whom he had given money for an abortion. Later at a fundraiser that Victoria had thrown for him, a still-pregnant Erin appears, smiling happily; meanwhile, messages appear on the tablet computer of an astonished Kingsley, blackmailing him into retirement from political life. It is later revealed that Emily released the videos of Kingsley and Erin to the press. When Nolan asks why, she says, "I didn't want to just destroy his career. I wanted to destroy his life."

== Production ==
The episode was written by supervising producer Salvatore Stabile, while CSI: Miami veteran Matt Earl Beesley directed it.

== Reception ==
=== Ratings ===
The episode was watched by 7.69 million viewers in its original American broadcast, earning a 2.4 rating/6% share in the 18–49 demographics. This was a desecrease of about one million viewers from the previous episode, which was watched by 8.54 million viewers with a 2.7 rating/8% share in the 18–49 demographics.
