= Trust (Revenge) =

- Revenge episode
- Episode no.: Season 1 Episode 2
- Directed by: Phillip Noyce
- Written by: Mike Kelley
- Original air date: September 28, 2011
- Running time: 42 minutes

Guest appearances
- Amber Valletta as Lydia Davis; Max Martini as Frank Stevens; Matthew Glave as Bill Harmon; Robbie Amell as Adam; James Tupper as David Clarke; Emily Alyn Lind as Young Amanda Clarke; Brian Goodman as Carl Porter

Episode chronology
← Previous "Pilot"	Next → "Betrayal"
- Revenge (season 1)

"Trust" is the second episode of the first season of the American drama television series Revenge. It aired on ABC on September 28, 2011, and was co-written by Mike Kelley and Joe Fazzio and directed by Phillip Noyce.

== Plot ==
Another part of Emily's (Emily VanCamp) plan is set in motion when she goes on her first date with Daniel (Josh Bowman). Also, Victoria's (Madeleine Stowe) suspicions about Emily grow, so she tries to find more information on her new neighbor.

Emily goes to the polo match and meets Bill Harmon (Matthew Glave), head of a successful investing firm. She says that she has put up a huge offer for the beach house she is currently renting. Daniel offers her a date if he wins the polo match. Victoria meets up with her husband's head of security, who informs her of Emily's wealthy past. Emily has a flashback of the birthday her father gave her a dog, which Emily names Sammy. Emily remembers Bill coming by on her birthday to see her and her father. Bill gives some bad news about a deal that has gone wrong between Bill and her father (James Tupper), and says that Conrad (Henry Czerny) will have the final say. Back to the present, Emily meets Bill in his office, and he shows her the list of his top investors and how much profit she can gain from investing with him. Emily asks Bill for a copy of the top-investors list, but Bill refuses. As Emily leaves, she gets a call from her realtor and learns that the beach house has been sold to someone else. Emily meets up with Nolan Ross (Gabriel Mann) and demands the house from him. Nolan explains that if he did not place a bid on the beach house, Victoria would have won, because she outbid Emily. Nolan says that the deed of the house is in Emily's name, as a birthday gift for "Amanda". He wishes to help her in her quest, since her father had helped back his company and made him a success, and Nolan wants to repay the debt. One night, during Emily's investigation of Bill Harmon's false testimony against her father (Bill said that her father had given money to the terrorists responsible for the attacks and deaths of all 246 Americans on Flight 197), Victoria calls her and invites her for tea the next day. Emily reveals to Victoria and Daniel during tea that she has become the official owner of the beach house. Daniel then promises to take her out on a date.

Conrad meets with Lydia (Amber Valletta), who informs him that she is ruined. The pictures that Emily had taken of Lydia and Conrad had been sent to Lydia's ex-husband's lawyer. Lydia had signed a pre-nup stating that if she were to commit adultery, she would get nothing. Lydia demands that Conrad write her a big check. As Emily is meeting Bill Harmon at a local cafe, she hugs Nolan and asks him to leave. During the cafe meeting, Emily tells Bill that she wants to heavily invest in AllCom, a Chinese cellular company. Bill asks her why, and she says "a little bird might have whispered something."

Emily calls Bill at his office and tells him that she wants to double her position with AllCom. Bill then demands everyone in his firm to invest everything in AllCom, believing that Nolan (one of the richest men in the world) will offer a huge contract to AllCom. However, Nolan says on the news moments later that he is investing in Unitech, AllCom's main competitor, instead. Bill Harmon's company loses $2 billion from betting big on AllCom, and Bill orders his employees to keep quiet about the matter.

Emily hacks into Bill's computer and prints out a list of Bill's top investors and informs them of the company's losses, posing as Bill's administrator. Jack Porter (Nick Wechsler) sells his boat named "Amanda" to Nolan to save his father's tavern from foreclosure. On a romantic walk on the beach with Daniel, Emily informs him that her parents died in a car crash when she was a young age. She then takes him to her house and Daniel surprises her with a housewarming party. At the party, Emily tells Nolan that Bill Harmon is ruined, showing him a newscast on her phone of Bill's investors pulling out of his company.

Though Emily talks to Jack again, she is not pleased to see him, and keeps the conversation light and short. Victoria gets a call from Conrad's head of security, Frank (Max Martini), and he tells her that Emily's past from the ages of 16-18 is sealed by the courts, as though she never existed. He then tells Victoria that Emily and Michael Davis (Lydia's ex-husband) were both on New York's Landmark and Preservation Association. He observes that Michael and Emily were absent on the same day, and assumes that Emily was the woman Michael left Lydia for. Victoria demands that he follow Emily everywhere she goes. After all the guests have left, Emily lights a single candle on a cupcake and says quietly to herself, "Happy Birthday Amanda", implying it is her real birthday today.

== Production ==
The episode was co-written by Joe Fazzio and creator Mike Kelley, while consulting producer Phillip Noyce directed it.

== Reception ==
=== Ratings ===
The episode was watched by 8.54 million viewers in its original American broadcast, earning a 2.7 rating/8% share in the 18–49 demographics, making it the third most watched show on ABC that night, being beaten by The Middle and Modern Family. The episode ranked second in its timeslot, beating Law & Order: Special Victims Unit on NBC but being beaten by CSI: Crime Scene Investigation on CBS.
