= Treachery (Revenge) =

- Revenge episode
- Episode no.: Season 1 Episode 8
- Directed by: Bobby Roth
- Written by: Ryan Scott
- Original air date: November 16, 2011
- Running time: 42 minutes

Guest appearances
- CCH Pounder as Warden Sharon Stiles; Margarita Levieva as Amanda Clarke; Amber Valletta as Lydia Davis; Max Martini as Frank Stevens; Ashton Holmes as Tyler Barrol; James Tupper as David Clarke; Emily Alyn Lind as Amanda Clarke; Jamal Duff as Big Ed; Cassius Willis as Detective Gunther

Episode chronology
← Previous "Charade"	Next → "Suspicion"
- Revenge (season 1)

"Treachery" is the eighth episode in the first season of the American drama television series Revenge. It aired on ABC on November 16, 2011, and was written by Ryan Scott and directed by Bobby Roth.

== Plot ==
Lydia Davis (Amber Valletta) comes out of her coma, but doesn't remember anything about what happened. Suspicions of Emily Thorne (Emily VanCamp) are amplified by Victoria Grayson (Madeleine Stowe). Tyler (Ashton Holmes) begins to realize their dirty plans. Emily's plot further unravels, and Victoria's unstable relationship with her family grows increasingly more tense when the real Emily Thorne, an unwanted pawn (Margarita Levieva) in Emily's game, heads to the Hamptons with questionable intentions. Meanwhile, Lydia's memory is a growing concern for the Graysons, and a recently embittered friend begins to play dirty.

== Production ==
The episode was written by Ryan Scott and directed by Bobby Roth.

== Reception ==
=== Ratings ===
The episode was watched by 7.98 million viewers and received a 2.6 rating/7% share in the 18-49 demographic, making it Revenge (along with CSI: Crime Scene Investigation) the highest-rated program of its time slot, beating Law & Order: Special Victims Unit.
