= Guilt (Revenge) =

- Revenge episode
- Lydia (Valletta) and Victoria (Stowe)
- Episode no.: Season 1 Episode 5
- Directed by: Kenneth Fink
- Written by: Nikki Toscano
- Original air date: October 19, 2011
- Running time: 42 minutes

Guest appearances
- Amber Valletta as Lydia Davis; Max Martini as Frank Stevens; Ashton Holmes as Tyler Barrol; James Tupper as David Clarke

Episode chronology
← Previous "Duplicity"	Next → "Intrigue"
- Revenge (season 1)

"Guilt" is the fifth episode of the first season of the American drama television series Revenge. It aired on ABC on October 19, 2011, and was written by Nikki Toscano and directed by Kenneth Fink.

== Plot ==
Victoria Grayson (Madeleine Stowe) finds out through Frank (Max Martini), that Conrad Grayson (Henry Czerny) has lied about his supposed business trip and instead spent the night in the city at Lydia's. When she confronts him about the secret rendezvous with Lydia Davis (Amber Valletta), Daniel Grayson's (Josh Bowman) friend Tyler (Ashton Holmes) overhears and tells Daniel about it. During the conversation, Daniel finally finds his phone. Daniel goes to see Jack to find his credit card and apologizes for his behavior the previous night. Lydia arrives unannounced to Victoria's luncheon.

Daniel comes to see Emily Thorne (Emily VanCamp) and they patch things up, but not before Daniel finding out that Tyler lied to him. Daniel confronts Tyler, but he claims he was looking out for Daniel. Conrad gifts Victoria a peace offering in the form of a $200,000 car, which she ultimately gives to Charlotte Grayson (Christa B. Allen) in an attempt to mend their relationship.

Nolan Ross (Gabriel Mann) plants a hidden camera in Emily's house, thus catching Lydia expressing her desire to get the house back from Emily. Emily refuses to give up the house and proceeds to ship Lydia's remaining belongings to her new place, planting "evidence" that makes it seem as if Lydia has been behind the string of downfalls. Nolan's hidden camera goes with the belongings and catches Lydia threatening Conrad about exposing their involvement in framing David Clarke (James Tupper). Nolan also sees Lydia seeming to have found out about Emily's past. He races to tell Emily that she might be in trouble. Frank breaks into Lydia's place and discovers documents suggesting she was the mastermind of the recent falls of influential people in the community, as well as her speech meant to expose the Graysons.

At the Open Arms Charity Benefit, Victoria lies to Lydia about renewing their friendship, in order to keep her from exposing their involvement in the terrorist act. Lydia comes home and they get into a scuffle that ends with Frank pushing Lydia from her penthouse balcony, before she lands on a taxi below with Frank informing Victoria that Lydia had jumped from her balcony and Nolan having witnessed the attack from his whale cam, believing that Lydia is dead after sneaking into her apartment to remove Emily's name from the employee list and finding her body.

In an effort to make up for the trouble at the last event, Victoria's party planner Ashley (Ashley Madekwe), spurred by a suggestion from Emily, manages to get Victoria and her charity Victims United Outreach honored by Open Arms in the upcoming benefit. As she is forced to once again publicly honor the victims of the ill-fated flight that sent David Clarke to prison, Victoria begins to feel that guilt weigh with renewed intensity on her conscience.

== Production ==
The episode was written by Nikki Toscano, and was directed by CSI: Crime Scene Investigation veteran Kenneth Fink.

== Reception ==
=== Ratings ===
The episode was watched by 7.94 million viewers and received a 2.5 rating/7% share in the 18-49 demographics.

=== Critical reception ===
Critics expressed delight in getting a dose of reality when the character Emily (Emily VanCamp) has finally found herself in a significantly dangerous situation of being exposed. They also praised the character developments of both Victoria (Madeleine Stowe) as she appears to have a heart and conscience after all, and Nolan (Gabriel Mann) as he becomes a bigger part of Emily's life because of his loyalty to her and her father. C. Orlando of TV Fanatic writes, "It's good to be reminded that he vowed to do his best to protect her. He's certainly doing all he can and I like his quirky loyalty more each week." Orlando went on to give the episode 4.5 out of 5 stars, while seemingly more impressed users gave an average of 4.9 out of 5 stars on the site.
