= Normal Adolescent Behavior =

2007 film by Beth Schacter

- Directed by: Beth Schacter
- Written by: Beth Schacter
- Starring: Amber Tamblyn; Ashton Holmes; Raviv Ullman
- Cinematography: Harlan Bosmajian
- Edited by: Benjamin Meyer
- Music by: Craig Deleon
- Distributed by: New Line Cinema
- Release dates: April 27, 2007 (Tribeca Film Festival); September 1, 2007 (Lifetime)
- Running time: 95 minutes
- Country: United States
- Language: English

Normal Adolescent Behavior (also known as Normal Adolescent Behavior: Havoc 2) is a 2007 American teen drama film written and directed by Beth Schacter. The film was an official selection of the 2007 Tribeca Film Festival.

The film is the story of a group of best friends, all of whom are in a six-way polyfidelitous relationship. They feel that being with this group—and only this group—is more fulfilling and overall better than conventional teenage dating. However, Wendy (Amber Tamblyn) begins to question the arrangement after meeting the boy next door.

Normal Adolescent Behavior premiered on Lifetime Television on September 1, 2007.

== Plot ==
Wendy, Billie, and Ann are seniors at an alternative private school; they spend all their time with fellow students Jonah, Price, and Robert. The six have been friends since elementary school and their friendship has become a six-person polyamorous relationship. They swap sex partners each week; their loyalty is to the group, not to one person.

After school orientation, Wendy meets Sean, a new senior who moved from Chicago; he finds out about her "inner geek", and she quickly recognizes a kindred spirit. Soon their friendship becomes romantic, and Wendy is torn between her genuine affection and desire for Sean, and her commitment and belief in the group.

Wendy starts to test the boundaries of her vow to her friends, and Billie realizes that she is going to have to fight to keep her best friend; which should not be a problem, since each of the teens has collected a box full of mementos from their sexual experience.

If Wendy tries to leave, Billie can destroy her reputation and relationship in a heartbeat. While Wendy is trying to decide between Sean and her friends, Wendy's younger brother Nathan meets Sean's mother, Helen, who is waiting a long three weeks to start a new job. Nathan develops a huge crush on her, and he uses his considerable cooking skills to try and woo her.

Then Wendy spends another Saturday night with the group, and she is unable to "cheat" on Sean; her hesitation is all that Billie needs to accuse her best friend. After the girls fight, Wendy takes out her frustration on a random couple who keep making out in front of her house. Ryan, hearing that Wendy is out of the group, tries to be friends, but Wendy is conflicted.

Sean and Wendy try to be a "normal" couple, but the group quickly tests the relationship: Billie puts the box of memorabilia in Sean's locker. Wendy claims she is not scared; she knows that Sean loves her. Maybe so, but when he sees the photos that document a lifetime of sexual experimentation, he is fed up and offers an ultimatum: Wendy can burn the box, leave the group, and be a normal girl, or they can break up. Wendy has gone from one ultimatum to another.

When Wendy sees Billie being hassled for being alone by other students, she wants to comfort her friend. Billie invites Wendy back to the group but she tests her—pushing Wendy to publicly ridicule Ryan, a girl who left the group last year along with her boyfriend, Aaron. Billie believes that seeing a really dark side of Wendy will keep Sean away for good, and somehow restore their group.

Wendy takes it a step further though, outing everyone's secrets; not just in front of Sean but in front of the student body. Each of the six has some skeletons in their closet, and having them all exposed is going to leave everyone isolated from their pseudofamily of six, and also ostracised within the school. The future (which Billie was planning out 10 years at the beginning of the movie) is a lot less certain - and Wendy is going to be the first one out of the gate in finding something new.

== Partial cast ==
- Amber Tamblyn as Wendy Bergman
- Ashton Holmes as Sean Mayer
- Raviv Ullman as Price
- Kelli Garner as Billie
- Daryl Sabara as Nathan Bergman
- Hilarie Burton as Ryan
- Stephen Colletti as Robert
- Kelly Lynch as Helen Meyer
- Julia Garro as Ann
- Edward Tournier as Jonah

== Alternate title ==
On October 16, 2007, New Line Cinema released the film on Region 1 DVD under the title Normal Adolescent Behavior: Havoc 2, despite there being no connection between Normal Adolescent Behavior and 2005's Havoc. In television airings, and many foreign DVD releases, the original title was used unchanged, including airings after the Region 1 DVD release.

In response to the name change, the director deleted both the film's promotional website, and its MySpace page.
