= Nikki Toscano =

American writer, producer and showrunner

Nikki Toscano is an American writer, producer and showrunner for television. She has served as the co-showrunner and executive producer of the Amazon Prime Video series Hunters (2020–2023) and as showrunner and executive producer of the Paramount+ miniseries The Offer (2022). She also made her directorial debut with the sixth episode of the Peacock series Long Bright River (2025), which she co-created.

== Career ==
Toscano wrote for the ABC show Revenge (2011–2015) and in 2011, she co-wrote with Sandra Gonzalez an article for Entertainment Weekly about her experience writing the episode Guilt. She also mentioned in the article that she did work on the ABC series Detroit 1-8-7 (2010–2011), which she described as "a show that didn’t get the viewers it deserved".

According to Toscano, her agent gave her David Weil's pilot script for Hunters and informed her that the producers of that show were seeking a showrunner to assist Weil. Toscano confirmed in interviews that Hunters was her first credit as an official showrunner.

Toscanco confirmed in an interview with Screen Rant that she got involved with The Offer after Jenna Santoianni and Nicole Clemens of Paramount Television called her and asked if she wanted to run the show, which was then described as a "top secret project".

In May 2022, it was announced that Toscano would serve as one of the consulting producers for the Showtime series American Gigolo (2022). In January 2024, it was announced that Toscano would serve as the showrunner and executive producer of the 2025 Peacock series Long Bright River. That series marked Toscano’s first creator credit as well as her directorial debut.

== Personal life ==
Toscano said in a 2020 interview with Comic Book Resources, "For me, personally, when I was 25, I fostered and adopted a 12-year-old African-American boy. And one of the biggest struggles that my ex-husband and I had in raising him was the fact that we could never put ourselves in his shoes, no matter how much we tried, no matter how much we wanted to be there." Toscano reiterated this in a Collider interview, adding that she has a "middle son" who at the time was 15 years old.
