= Mark B. Perry =

American television producer and writer

- Born: Atlanta, Georgia, US
- Education: University of Georgia
- Occupations: Television producer, television writer
- Years active: 1989–present

Mark B. Perry is an American television producer and writer.

Perry has written and produced for the television series The Wonder Years, Law & Order, One Tree Hill, Brothers & Sisters, Pasadena, What About Brian, Windfall, Party of Five, its spin-off Time of Your Life and Ghost Whisperer, the latter three series all starred Jennifer Love Hewitt. Perry won a Primetime Emmy Award in 1993 for his work on Picket Fences, as a part of the producing and writing team.

Perry was a writer and co-executive producer on the ABC series Revenge.
