= Dan Dworkin =

American screenwriter and producer

- Born: Daniel Seth Dworkin; May 23, 1972 (age 54); San Diego, California, U.S.
- Occupations: Producer, screenwriter
- Writing career
- Notable works: Matador; Revenge; Cold Case; Scream

Daniel Seth Dworkin (born May 23, 1972) is an American screenwriter and television producer. He and writing partner Jay Beattie are best known for co-creating Matador alongside Roberto Orci for Robert Rodriguez's El Rey Network in 2014. The series starred Gabriel Luna, Alfred Molina, Nicky Whelan, Neil Hopkins, and Elizabeth Peña.

Together, Dan and Jay also developed MTV's Scream, an anthology television series, based on the popular horror film franchise, which premiered on June 30, 2015.

His other TV writing credits include: Revenge, The Event, Cold Case, Criminal Minds and American Horror Story: 1984, the ninth season of the FX horror anthology television series, American Horror Story.

His short fiction has been published on Pseudopod and Popcorn Fiction.
