= Cassius Willis =

American actor

- Occupation: actor
- Years active: 2005–present

Cassius Willis is an American actor, who has guest starred in various TV shows and movies. He most recently was seen in the recurring roles of Det. Gil Wallace on the CBS soap opera The Young and the Restless and Det. Robert Gunther on the ABC serial drama Revenge. He appeared in the 2014 film Earth to Echo.

== Filmography ==
Title	Year	Role	Notes
The Pacifier	2005	Boat Captain	
Zodiac	2007	Uniform Cop	
CSI: Crime Scene Investigation	2007	Craig Jay	Episode: "The Case of the Cross-Dressing Carp"
Brothers & Sisters	2007	Secret Service Agent	Episode: "Holy Matrimony!"
Lakeview Terrace	2008	Officer Friendly	
90210	2008	Owens	Episode: ""Hollywood Forever"
The Young and the Restless	2008-2009	Det. Gil Wallace	42 episodes
Weeds	2010	Piano Player	Episode: "A Yippity Sippity"
Answers to Nothing	2011	Detective Grimes	
Revenge	2011-2015	Detective Robert Gunther	6 episodes
Earth to Echo	2014	Calvin Simms	
Training Day	2017	Detective Billy Craig	4 episodes
