= Kenneth Fink =

American television director and producer

- Other name: Ken Fink
- Occupations: Television director, television producer
- Years active: 1979–present

Kenneth Fink is an American television director and television producer of several television series. Prior to directing, Fink was a television documentary-segment producer. He has directed many episodes of several series including: Cracker, The Expanse, Dawson's Creek, Oz, Nash Bridges, CSI: Crime Scene Investigation, Millennium, Fringe, Revenge, Nikita, Arrow, Quantico, Charmed and CSI: Vegas.
