= Mike Kelley (writer) =

American screenwriter (born 1967)

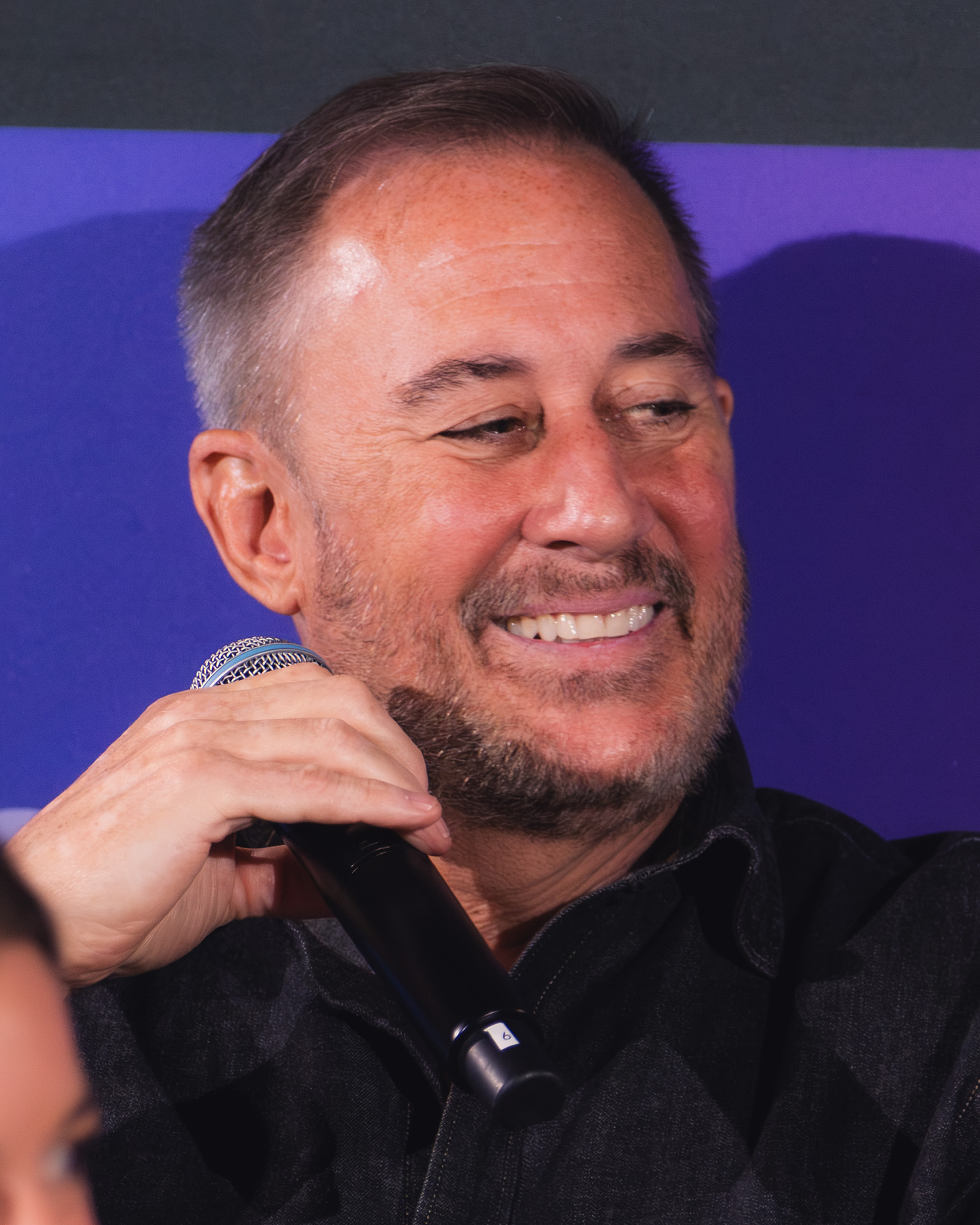
Kelley in 2026

Michael Kelley (born 1967, Chicago, Illinois) is an American television writer and producer and creator of television series What/If, Revenge and Swingtown.

== Early life ==
Kelley was born in Chicago, growing up and attending school at New Trier High School in Winnetka, Illinois, until 1985. A classmate of his was musician Liz Phair, whom he would later bring to the television scoring business.

== Career ==
Kelley has written and produced on shows including The O.C. and Providence. He co-wrote episodes of Providence with Jennifer M. Johnson. He is creator of the TV series Swingtown, and has also written episodes for the show, which began airing on CBS in 2008.

Kelley created and wrote ABC's Revenge, a contemporary re-imagining of Alexandre Dumas' The Count of Monte Cristo from a female perspective.

In August 2018, it was announced that Kelley will be credited as an executive producer, writer and creator for the Netflix anthology thriller miniseries, What/If. The series premiered on May 24, 2019.
