= Ashton Holmes =

American actor

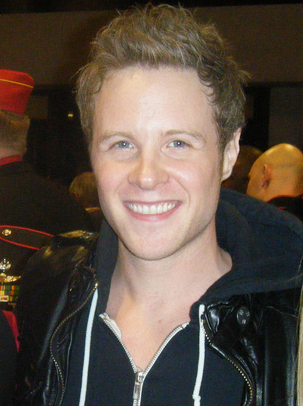
- Holmes in February 2010
- Born: Albany, New York, U.S.
- Occupation: Actor
- Years active: 2003–present

Ashton Holmes is an American actor, best known for the role of Jack Stall in A History of Violence (2005), Private Sidney Phillips in the HBO miniseries The Pacific (2010), Thom on the CW action-thriller series Nikita (2010–2011), and as Tyler Barrol on the ABC drama series Revenge (2011–2012).

== Personal life ==
Holmes was born in Albany, New York. His mother, Susan, is a social worker. At a young age he began taking acting lessons and appeared in community theater. He attended the Albany Academy. During his senior year of high school, he attended the intern program of the New York State Theater Institute.

Holmes was involved with the Albany music scene, and was the lead singer for local band Method of Groove. During this time, Holmes befriended Nyack, New York, band Coheed and Cambria, and began shopping around their demos to local indie labels. According to the Coheed and Cambria documentary Neverender: Children of The Fence Edition, in which Holmes appears, it was Holmes who eventually earned them their first record deal with Equal Vision Records.

== Career ==
In 2004, Holmes landed a 3-episode arc playing the character Greg Johnson in the daytime soap opera One Life to Live. In 2005 he starred in David Cronenberg's film A History of Violence. The next year, he had a recurring role on ABC's series Boston Legal. He also appeared in Peaceful Warrior in 2006, What We Do Is Secret and Normal Adolescent Behavior in 2007. In 2007 Holmes co-starred with Emily Blunt in the horror film Wind Chill. In 2008 he appeared in the comedy-drama film Smart People.

On television he appeared in episodes of Law & Order: Special Victims Unit, Cold Case, Ghost Whisperer, Numbers, House, Law & Order: Criminal Intent and CSI: Crime Scene Investigation.

In 2010 Holmes played Sid Phillips in the HBO miniseries The Pacific. From 2010 to 2011, he starred as Thom in The CW series Nikita. From 2011 to 2012, he appeared as Tyler Barrol on the ABC drama series Revenge. On February 21, 2013, it was reported that Holmes was cast as Wyatt Bickford in the ABC drama pilot Reckless.

From 2002 to 2005, Holmes was also part of the Collins Tour company for Jonathan Larson's musical, Rent, in which he played one of the lead characters, Mark Cohen.

== Filmography ==
=== Film ===
Year	Title	Role	Notes
2003	Raising Hell	Zach Adler	Direct-to-video
2005	A History of Violence	Jack Stall	
2006	Peaceful Warrior	Tommy	
2007	Wind Chill	Guy	
2007	Normal Adolescent Behavior	Sean Mayer	
2007	What We Do Is Secret	Rob Henley	
2008	Smart People	James Wetherhold	
2011	The Divide	Adrien	
2013	Cold Turkey	Jacob	
2014	Only Human	Jason Lang	
2016	Imperfections	Alex	
2018	Acts of Violence	Roman	

=== Television ===
Year	Title	Role	Notes
2003	Law & Order: Special Victims Unit	Davis Harrington	Episode: "Soulless"
2004	One Life to Live	Greg Johnson	3 episodes
2004	Cold Case	Sean Morgan / Bobby Gordon (2004)	Episode: "Maternal Instincts"
2005	Ghost Whisperer	Kirk Jensen	Episode: "Voices"
2006	Boston Legal	Scott Little	Recurring role
2008	Numbers	Emerson Laidlaw	Episode: "Scan Man"
2009	Law & Order: Criminal Intent	Hank	Episode: "Rock Star"
2009	House	Scott	Episode: "Both Sides Now"
2009	CSI: Crime Scene Investigation	Sam Trent	Episode: "Better Off Dead"
2010	The Pacific	Sid Phillips	Miniseries
2010–2011	Nikita	Thom	Main cast (season 1)
2011	Lie to Me	Zach Morstein	Episode: "Killer App"
2011–2012	Revenge	Tyler Barrol	Recurring role
2013	Supernatural	Ephraim	Episode: "Heaven Can't Wait"
2014	Criminal Minds	Finn Bailey	Episode: "Persuasion"
2017	Being Mary Jane	Garrett Keswick	Recurring
2018	Arrow	Eric Cartier Jr.	Episode: "The Dragon"
2020	Bosch	Roger Dillon	Episodes: "Copy Cat," "Dark Sacred Night"
