= Josh Bowman =

English actor (born 1988)

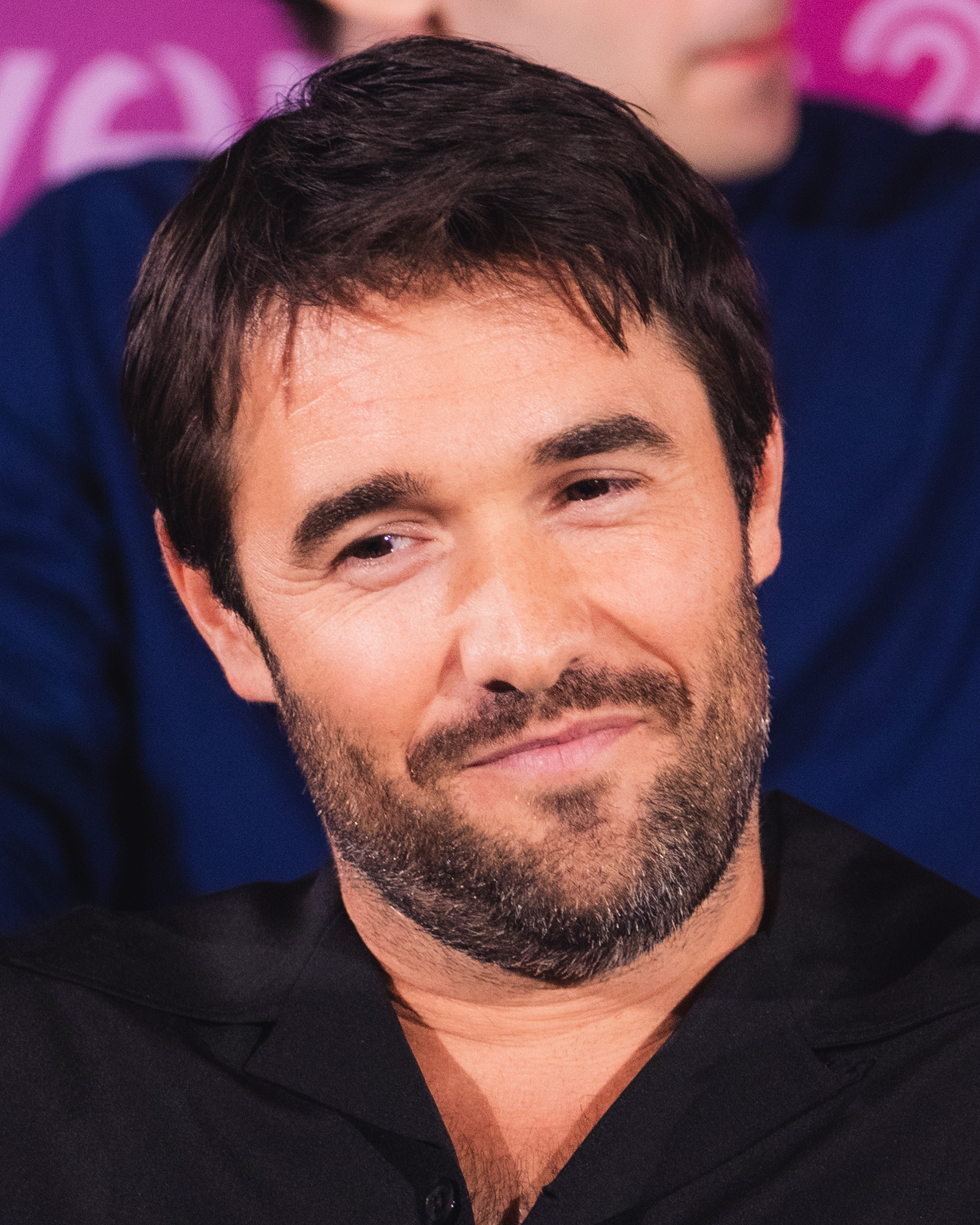
- Bowman in 2026
- Born: Joshua Tobias Bowman; 4 March 1988 (age 38); Berkshire, England
- Occupation: Actor
- Years active: 2007–present
- Spouse: Emily VanCamp (m. 2018)
- Children: 2
- Relatives: Scarlett Bowman (sister)

Joshua Tobias Bowman (born 4 March 1988) is an English actor. He is best known for his role as Daniel Grayson in the TV series Revenge.

== Early life ==
Bowman was born in Berkshire on 4 March 1988. He was educated at the Wellington College boarding school. His sister, Scarlett Bowman, is a former Hollyoaks star. Bowman states that his father is Jewish, of Russian Jewish descent. He said in the interview that he "feels Jewish, ish." Bowman's other ancestry is English, Irish, and distant Italian.

At the age of 18, Bowman was briefly a professional rugby player for Saracens F.C., before suffering two shoulder dislocations in his first year and being asked to leave.

== Career ==
Bowman made his acting debut in 2007 playing Dimitri in the TV series Genie in the House. He then spent two years on the British series Holby City and went on to appear in the films 13Hrs, Prowl, Exteriors and Love’s Kitchen. In 2011, he joined the ABC Family show Make It or Break It, playing a gymnast named Max Spencer.

In 2011, he was selected as one of the Stars of Tomorrow by Screen International. Bowman played Daniel Grayson, a series regular, in the ABC series Revenge. Bowman starred in the ABC series Time After Time, about the adventures of a young H. G. Wells; it was cancelled in 2017.

Bowman studied method acting at the Lee Strasberg Institute in New York.

Bowman played Krasko in the Doctor Who episode "Rosa".

== Personal life ==
Bowman began dating his Revenge co-star Emily VanCamp in late 2011. The couple became engaged on 11 May 2017 and married on 15 December 2018 in The Bahamas. In 2021, VanCamp announced the birth of their first child, a daughter, on her Instagram account. In 2024, VanCamp announced that she gave birth to their second daughter.

== Filmography ==
Film and television roles
Year	Title	Role	Notes
2007	Genie in the House	Dimitri/Royal Hunk	2 episodes
2009	Myths	Zeus	
2009	Betwixt	Luke	Unsold television pilot
2009–10	Holby City	Scott James	9 episodes
2010	13Hrs	Doug Walker	
2010	Prowl	Peter	
2011	Exteriors	Adam	
2011	Love's Kitchen	Roberto Alesandro	
2011	Make It or Break It	Max	Recurring role (season 2)
2011–15	Revenge	Daniel Grayson	Main role, 77 episodes Nominated - Teen Choice Awards TV Breakout Star: Male
2012	So Undercover	Nicholas	
2013	The Last Keepers	Taylor	
2016	Level Up	Matt	
2017	Time After Time	John Stevenson / Jack the Ripper	Main role
2018	Doctor Who	Krasko	1 episode: "Rosa"
2018	Lore	Jack Parsons	1 episode: "Jack Parsons: The Devil and the Divine"
2019	Escaping the Madhouse: The Nellie Bly Story	Dr. Josiah	Lifetime television movie
2020	Our Girl	(Dr.) Captain Antonio	6 episodes
2021	The Desperate Hour	Emergency Police	
2023	Miranda's Victim	Charles	

Video game roles
Year	Title	Role	Notes
2020	Final Fantasy VII Remake	Rufus Shinra	Supporting (voice)
2024	Final Fantasy VII Rebirth	Rufus Shinra	Supporting (voice)
