= Revenge (TV series) =

2011 American drama television series

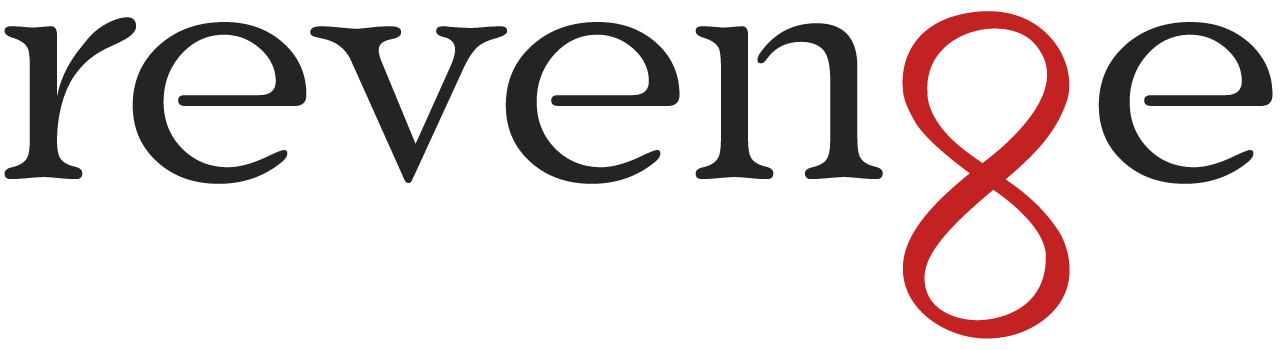
- Genre: Soap opera; Psychological thriller; Mystery; Drama
- Created by: Mike Kelley
- Based on: The Count of Monte Cristo by Alexandre Dumas
- Starring: Madeleine Stowe; Emily VanCamp; Gabriel Mann; Henry Czerny; Ashley Madekwe; Nick Wechsler; Josh Bowman; Connor Paolo; Christa B. Allen; Barry Sloane; James Tupper; Karine Vanasse; Brian Hallisay; Elena Satine
- Composers: iZLER (music; credited as Fil Eisler from "Dissolution")
- Country of origin: United States
- Original language: English
- No. of seasons: 4
- No. of episodes: 89 (list of episodes)

Production
- Executive producers: Mike Kelley; Marty C. Bowen; Wyck Godfrey; Phillip Noyce; Melissa Loy; Mark B. Perry; Sunil Nayar; Gretchen J. Berg; Aaron Harberts
- Producers: Randy Sutter; Samantha Thomas; Mike Kelley; Melissa Loy; Joe Fazzio; Ted Babcock
- Production locations: Los Angeles, California; Southampton, New York; Southport, North Carolina; Wilmington, North Carolina (pilot)
- Cinematography: Chris Manley; Cynthia Pusheck; John Smith; Lance Luckey
- Editors: Martin Nicholson; Sue Blainey; Conrad Smart; Lance Luckey
- Camera setup: Single-camera
- Running time: 43 minutes
- Production companies: Page Fright Productions; Mike Kelley Productions; Temple Hill Productions; ABC Studios

Original release
- Network: ABC
- Release: September 21, 2011 – May 10, 2015

Related
- İntikam; Venganza; Karmma Calling

Revenge is an American drama television series created by Mike Kelley and starring Madeleine Stowe and Emily VanCamp, which debuted on September 21, 2011, on ABC. The plot is inspired by Alexandre Dumas' 1844 novel The Count of Monte Cristo. During its first season, it aired on Wednesdays at 10:00 pm (Eastern), and later aired on Sundays for seasons two through four, first at 9:00pm and then at 10:00pm.

The series was picked up for a full season by the ABC television network after garnering a 3.3 Nielsen rating in the 18–49 age advertising demographic for its pilot episode, and regularly winning its time slot in the 18–49 demo. Stowe was nominated for the 2012 Golden Globe Award for Best Actress – Television Series Drama, while the series was nominated for Favorite New TV Drama at the 2012 People's Choice Awards. Revenge became ABC's highest-rated series in Wednesday's 10 pm slot since Lost's 2006–2007 season and was the only new series in more than four years to replicate the 18–49 demo ratings success that Lost had in its time slot since leaving the air.

The series concluded on May 10, 2015. On August 4, 2015, ABC announced the possibility of a spin-off series. In November 2019, it was announced that a sequel series with the same title was in the works at ABC, but in June 2020, the sequel was passed on by ABC.

== Premise ==
A young woman poses as a new resident and returns to an affluent beachside town, the Hamptons, in order to seek revenge on the families that wronged her 20 years earlier. In the midst of her plan, she uncovers secrets, lies, and affairs, and finds herself in multiple dangerous situations that could tear the beachside town apart.

== Episodes ==
| Season | Episodes | Originally released | |
| Season | Episodes | First released | Last released |
|---|---|---|---|
| 1 | 22 | September 21, 2011 | May 23, 2012 |
| 2 | 22 | September 30, 2012 | May 12, 2013 |
| 3 | 22 | September 29, 2013 | May 11, 2014 |
| 4 | 23 | September 28, 2014 | May 10, 2015 |

== Cast and characters ==
| Actor | Character | Season | | | |
| Actor | Character | 1 | 2 | 3 | 4 |
|---|---|---|---|---|---|
| Madeleine Stowe | Victoria Grayson | Main | Main | Main | Main |
| Emily VanCamp | Emily Thorne | Main | Main | Main | Main |
| Gabriel Mann | Nolan Ross | Main | Main | Main | Main |
| Henry Czerny | Conrad Grayson | Main | Main | Main | Guest |
| Ashley Madekwe | Ashley Davenport | Main | Main | Guest | |
| Nick Wechsler | Jack Porter | Main | Main | Main | Main |
| Josh Bowman | Daniel Grayson | Main (Note: Bowman departs in "Epitaph" (episode 4.11).) | Main | Main | Main |
| Connor Paolo | Declan Porter | Main | Main | | |
| Christa B. Allen | Charlotte Grayson | Main (Note: Allen departs in "Damage" (episode 4.6) but returns as a guest star for "Plea" (episode 4.22) and "Two Graves" (episode 4.23).) | Main | Main | Main |
| Barry Sloane | Aiden Mathis | | Main (Note: Initially recurring, Sloane joins the main cast from "Sacrifice" (episode 2.14).) | Main | |
| James Tupper | David Clarke | Recurring | Recurring | Recurring | Main |
| Karine Vanasse | Margaux LeMarchal | | | Recurring | Main |
| Brian Hallisay | Ben Hunter | | | | Main (Note: Initially recurring, Hallisay joins the main cast from "Contact" (episode 4.8).) |
| Elena Satine | Louise Ellis | | | | Main (Note: Initially recurring, Satine joins the main cast from "Bait" (episode 4.15).) |

== Production ==
In January 2011, ABC ordered the script to pilot. In March 2011, actress Emily VanCamp was cast as the lead character, and shortly afterwards it was released that Ashley Madekwe was cast in the series. Madeleine Stowe and Henry Czerny joined the cast as well. Max Martini and Robbie Amell joined the cast respectively as Frank Stevens, a private investigator and Adam, a wealthy student, who is hoping to attend Yale. James Tupper replaced Marc Blucas in the role of Emily's father, after Blucas was forced to drop out due to his commitment on Necessary Roughness. Recurring Gossip Girl star Connor Paolo was cast as a series regular playing the character of Declan Porter. Former Nikita star Ashton Holmes landed a recurring role as Tyler Barrol, a Harvard classmate of Daniel Grayson. On April 22, 2013, it was announced that Mike Kelley was stepping down as the executive producer and showrunner after season two, current executive producer Sunil Nayar was expected to take over during the anticipated third season. On May 3, 2013, it was confirmed that Sunil Nayar would take the reins after signing a two-year deal with ABC Studios to remain as executive producer. On May 21, 2013, it was announced that Gretchen J. Berg and Aaron Harberts had inked a two-year deal with ABC Studios which would have them serve as executive producers on the third season alongside Sunil Nayar.

On May 13, 2011, ABC picked the project up to series. On May 17, 2011, ABC announced that the series would air on Wednesday nights at 10:00 pm Eastern/9:00 pm Central, beginning in the 2011 fall season. The pilot was screened early on ABC's website during a promotional tie-in with Amazon Kindle.

It was announced in spring 2014 that a Revenge graphic novel was in the works, published by Marvel Comics. It was released on September 3, 2014, and explored the origins of Emily Thorne.

Revenge was filmed on Stage 25 at the Manhattan Beach Studios. Filming of the series ended on April 11, 2015.

On April 29, 2015, ABC announced that Revenge would be cancelled after four seasons, with its final episode broadcast on May 10. On August 4, 2015, a possible spin-off series was announced.

== Broadcast ==
In Australia, it debuted on Seven Network on February 13, 2012. The second season began airing on February 4, 2013, with the third season returning on February 3, 2014, and the fourth season returning on February 23, 2015.

In Canada, Revenge airs simultaneously on City.

In Ireland, it airs on RTÉ on Tuesdays at 10 pm. In New Zealand, the show airs on TVNZ.

In Thailand, the series premiered on Channel 7 on March 28, 2015. Season two returned on July 5, 2015, with season three returning on June 29, 2016, and season four returning on August 26, 2016.

In the United Kingdom, the series premiered on E4 on May 28, 2012. Season two returned on January 7, 2013, with season three returning on January 6, 2014, and season four returning on January 5, 2015.

In the United Arab Emirates, the series premiered on October 1, 2012, on Dubai One, and aired weekly.

== Reception ==
=== Critical reception ===
Critical response of Revenge
| Season | Rotten Tomatoes | Metacritic |
|---|---|---|
| 1 | 81% (36 reviews) | 66 (26 reviews) |
| 2 | 40% (10 reviews) | —N/a |
| 3 | 67% (9 reviews) | —N/a |
| 4 | 88% (8 reviews) | —N/a |

As of January 2021, the series holds an approval rating of 69% on the review aggregation website Rotten Tomatoes. Metacritic, which uses a weighted average, assigned the series a score of 67 out of 100 based on 28 critics. Dorothy Rabinowitz of The Wall Street Journal praised the series, writing, "The arrival of one pure and unadulterated drama about a passion as old as man is something to celebrate. That's particularly true when that drama is as spellbinding in its satisfyingly gaudy way, as Revenge turns out to be", while awarding particular praise to Van Camp for a "beguiling and entirely chilling study in revenge lust". Writing for The New York Times, Alessandra Stanley compared the series favorably with Gossip Girl, concluding that it has "just enough campy suspense to be enjoyable". Episode 5 of the series received particular acclaim, with C. Orlando of TV Fanatic writing that "Revenge took things to a whole new level this week", and noting with reference to the set-up of David Clarke that "Victoria seems the only one with a conscience."

Yahoo! TV mentioned the series among the top television programs of 2011. The series also made the covers of Parade, Entertainment Weekly, and TV Guide, and was featured in Rolling Stone, Vanity Fair, Vogue, People, Us Weekly, Cosmopolitan, Seventeen, and Teen Vogue magazines.

On May 10, 2012, ABC announced that it had renewed Revenge for a second season. The Hollywood Reporter reported that it was one of the first series to get a "stamp of approval" from ABC Entertainment President Paul Lee, who called the show "sexy" and "sticky", telling critics in January, "You just want more of it."

=== Ratings ===
The pilot episode scored 10.02 million viewers in live plus same day, winning the 10 pm hour time slot against CSI: Crime Scene Investigation and Law & Order: Special Victims Unit. Revenge reportedly was the highest-rated television series in the hour for ABC since Lost. On October 22, 2011, it was reported that Revenge regularly won its hour in the 18–34 and 18–49 age demographics ahead of CSI and Law & Order: Special Victims Unit.

After a nearly two-month hiatus beginning on February 29, 2012, Revenge returned on April 18, 2012, at number one in the Nielsen ratings and won its time slot against every other television network with a first-place finish among Total Viewers, Adults 18–49 and Adults 25–54. Revenge won over an original episode of NBC's Law & Order: Special Victims Unit in Total Viewers (+33%), Adults 18–49 (+53%) and Adults 25–54 (+45%) and generated big year-to-year time-period gains in Total Viewers (+81%), Adults 18–49 (+35%) and Adults 25–54 (+38%), rising over first-run programming on the same night last year. The April 18, 2012, episode attracted ABC's largest audience to the hour since the middle of February sweeps on February 15, 2012.

Revenge premiered strongly during its second season, with a 3.2 adults 18–49 rating. However, as the season went on, due to negative feedback on the storyline, as well as the scheduling of episodes against Golden Globe Awards, NFC Championship Game, and the Grammy Awards, Revenge hit lows of 2.0, 1.7, and 1.4 in the adults 18–49 rating, respectively, within three consecutive episodes. The ratings never recovered back to the levels of the fall 2012, and eventually ended the season with a 1.7 adults 18–49 rating.

| Season | Time slot (ET) | # Ep. | Premiered | | Ended | | TV season | Rank | Viewers (in millions) |
| Season | Time slot (ET) | # Ep. | Date | Premiere Viewers (in millions) | Date | Finale Viewers (in millions) | TV season | Rank | Viewers (in millions) |
|---|---|---|---|---|---|---|---|---|---|
| 1 | Wednesday 10:00 pm | 22 | September 21, 2011 | 10.02 | May 23, 2012 | 7.85 | 2011–12 | #56 | 8.72 |
| 2 | Sunday 9:00 pm | 22 | September 30, 2012 | 9.74 | May 12, 2013 | 6.12 | 2012–13 | #32 | 8.87 |
| 3 | Sunday 9:00 pm (1–13); Sunday 10:00 pm (14–22) | 22 | September 29, 2013 | 8.11 | May 11, 2014 | 4.87 | 2013–14 | #39 | 8.44 |
| 4 | Sunday 10:00 pm | 23 | September 28, 2014 | 5.14 | May 10, 2015 | 4.80 | 2014–15 | #83 | 6.74 |

=== Awards and nominations ===
Revenge was nominated for Favorite New TV Drama at the 2012 People's Choice Awards. Madeleine Stowe received a Golden Globe nomination for Best Actress in a TV drama.

| Year | Award | Category | Nominee(s) | Outcome |
|---|---|---|---|---|
| 2012 | ALMA Awards | Favorite TV Actress — Drama | Madeleine Stowe | Nominated |
| 2012 | Casting Society of America Announces Artios Awards | Television Pilot — Drama | Revenge | Nominated |
| 2012 | Gay and Lesbian Entertainment Critics Association | Campy TV Show of the Year | Revenge | Won |
| 2012 | Gay and Lesbian Entertainment Critics Association | Television Performance of the Year | Madeleine Stowe | Nominated |
| 2012 | Golden Globe Awards | Best Actress – Television Series Drama | Madeleine Stowe | Nominated |
| 2012 | Golden Reel Awards | Best Sound Editing — Television Episodic — Music | Revenge | Nominated |
| 2012 | Gracie Allen Awards | Outstanding Drama | Revenge | Won |
| 2012 | People's Choice Awards | Favorite New TV Drama | Revenge | Nominated |
| 2012 | Teen Choice Awards | Choice TV Actress: Drama | Emily VanCamp | Nominated |
| 2012 | Teen Choice Awards | Choice TV Breakout Show | Revenge | Nominated |
| 2012 | Teen Choice Awards | Choice TV Breakout Star: Male | Josh Bowman | Nominated |
| 2012 | Teen Choice Awards | Choice TV Male Scene Stealer | Gabriel Mann | Nominated |
| 2012 | Teen Choice Awards | Choice TV Show: Drama | Revenge | Nominated |
| 2012 | Television Critics Association Awards | Outstanding New Program | Revenge | Nominated |
| 2012 | Young Artist Awards | Best Performance in a TV Series — Recurring Young Actress Ten and Under | Emily Alyn Lind | Won |
| 2013 | Costume Designers Guild Awards | Outstanding Contemporary Television Series | Revenge | Nominated |
| 2013 | People's Choice Awards | Favorite Network TV Drama | Revenge | Nominated |
| 2013 | Teen Choice Awards | Choice TV Actor: Drama | Joshua Bowman | Nominated |
| 2013 | Teen Choice Awards | Choice TV Actor: Drama | Nick Wechsler | Nominated |
| 2013 | Teen Choice Awards | Choice TV Actress: Drama | Emily VanCamp | Nominated |
| 2013 | Teen Choice Awards | Choice TV Show: Drama | Revenge | Nominated |
| 2014 | NAACP Image Awards | Outstanding Writing in a Dramatic Series — Ep. "Mercy" | Karin Gist | Nominated |
| 2015 | People's Choice Awards | Favorite Network TV Drama | Revenge | Nominated |

== Soundtrack ==
Revenge (Original Television Soundtrack)

Soundtrack album by iZLER
- Released: 2011
- Genre: Soundtrack
- Length: 1:05:05
- Label: Intrada Records
- Producer: iZLER

The music for Revenge is composed by iZLER. In 2013, Intrada Records released an album, Revenge (Original Television Soundtrack), featuring selections from his work for the first two seasons. From season three's "Dissolution" onwards, iZLER is credited as Fil Eisler. Angus and Julia Stone's "For You" is also heavily featured throughout the series.

=== Track listing ===
| No. | Title | Length |
|---|---|---|
| 1. | "Mortal Vindication (Revenge Main Theme)" | 2:30 |
| 2. | "Lose Your Compassion" | 1:38 |
| 3. | "Previous Investments" | 2:03 |
| 4. | "Destiny" | 3:23 |
| 5. | "The Wrong Amanda (Emily And Aiden Theme)" | 1:43 |
| 6. | "Who Is the Falcon?" | 2:07 |
| 7. | "Meet the Graysons" | 2:25 |
| 8. | "The Christening" | 1:51 |
| 9. | "Tyler Goes Nuts" | 2:03 |
| 10. | "Return to the Fire and Ice Ball" | 1:46 |
| 11. | "Don't Say a Word" | 1:52 |
| 12. | "The Marriage of Jack and Fauxmanda" | 3:12 |
| 13. | "Honor Thy Father" | 2:00 |
| 14. | "High Tension Boating (SOS Theme Pt.1)" | 3:48 |
| 15. | "The Sinking (SOS Theme Pt.2)" | 4:44 |
| 16. | "Requiem for Amanda" | 4:56 |
| 17. | "Sins of the Mother" | 3:23 |
| 18. | "Farewell Fauxmanda" | 3:25 |
| 19. | "Darkness" | 2:39 |
| 20. | "Stabbed in the Back" | 2:28 |
| 21. | "A Farewell to Porters" | 2:03 |
| 22. | "I Am Amanda Clarke" | 7:23 |
| 23. | "Adagio for Emily / Let It Play" | 1:32 |

== Adaptations ==
| Title | Region(s) | Release | Network(s) |
|---|---|---|---|
| Venganza | Colombia | 2017 | RCN Televisión |
| İntikam | Turkey | 2013–14 | Kanal D |
| Karmma Calling | India | 2024 | Hotstar |

== Sequel series ==
On November 6, 2019, it was announced that a sequel series with the same name was in the works at ABC. On June 29, 2020, ABC passed on the sequel series.
