= Louise Ellis =

Louise Ellis may refer to:

- Louise Ellis, a character in EastEnders
- Louise Ellis, a character in the TV series Revenge
