= Emily Thorne =

Fictional character

- Revenge character
- Emily VanCamp as Emily Thorne
- First appearance: "Pilot" (episode 1.01)
- Last appearance: "Two Graves" (episode 4.23)
- Created by: Mike Kelley
- Based on: Edmond Dantès by Alexandre Dumas
- Portrayed by: Emily VanCamp; Emily Alyn Lind (8–9-years-old); Alyvia Alyn Lind (5-years-old)

In-universe information
- Aliases: Emily Thorne; Michelle Banks; Eve Tucker; Allison Rodner; Diane Miller; Emily Grayson; Amanda Ross; Rebecca Stone; Anna Bishop
- Gender: Female
- Occupation: Philanthropist and socialite
- Family: David Clarke (father, deceased); Kara Clarke-Murphy (mother); Gordon Murphy (stepfather; deceased); Charlotte Clarke (half-sister); Charlotte Clarke (great aunt; deceased)
- Spouses: Rohan Kamath (ex-husband); Daniel Grayson (ex-husband; deceased); Jack Porter (husband)
- Children: Carl Porter (stepson)
- Residence: Southampton, New York

Amanda Clarke, formerly known by the pseudonym Emily Thorne (also known as Emily Grayson), is a fictional character and the protagonist of the ABC television series Revenge (2011–2015), portrayed by Emily VanCamp, based on Edmond Dantès, the titular protagonist of Alexandre Dumas' 1844 novel The Count of Monte Cristo.

== Description ==
Emily Thorne has been described as a flawed and multifaceted heroine figure. She is emotionally scarred by her father's unjust imprisonment and a childhood spent in the foster care system, and she commits many morally questionable acts motivated by her obsessive desire for retribution against the woman who destroyed her family. Emily VanCamp, who portrays Thorne, described the character as having become "corrupted" to the point where she was concerned that it would be difficult to make Thorne appealing to audiences. Thorne usually appears calm and calculating, but as the series progresses, she begins to reveal vulnerabilities that impedes her efforts to get vengeance. According to VanCamp, Thorne has tried to bury her emotions but has an unstable emotional side, which means her feelings come out in extremes.

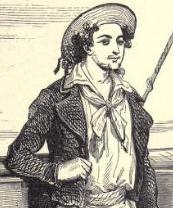
Emily Thorne is a modern female interpretation of the character Edmond Dantès from The Count of Monte Cristo.

In Revenge, Thorne serves as a modern female version of Edmond Dantès, the main character of The Count of Monte Cristo by Alexandre Dumas, the novel that inspired the series. According to Anthony Letizia of alterna-Tv.com, similar to Dantès being falsely imprisoned for 14 years on a false charge of treason, Thorne was imprisoned in juvenile detention (Note: Letizia says that Emily was imprisoned for ten years, while according to episode 3 of season 1, Emily was only imprisoned for two years, from ages 16 to 18. "Ten years" comes from the pilot episode in which Emily tell Nolan she hadn't seen her father for ten years.) and her father was framed for financing a terrorist attack on the United States. Thorne has been left shares in Nolcorp, which she liquidates to the value of $40 billion and is a fund for her revenge against the Grayson family, making her the second richest character in the series after Nolan. Letizia notes several more similarities between the characters such as both of them training in combat after leaving incarceration in preparation for their plans of revenge and both pursuing revenge against a group of powerful and wealthy conspirators.

Her pursuit of revenge has been noted as a sympathetic aspect of the character. Commentators cited the Great Recession as making viewers more receptive to Thorne's efforts to get revenge against a group of privileged elites for the harm they caused her family. VanCamp described the character as "quite justified in what she's doing" adding that "everybody can connect with the theme of revenge, whether they act on it or not." The character's "girl next door" appearance is attributed as contributing to this appeal, with show producer Mike Kelly suggesting that it means viewers are "rooting for her even though she's doing something that's kind of diabolical."

Madeleine Stowe, who portrays the antagonist Victoria Grayson on Revenge, has likened her own character to Thorne. Stowe notes the two characters as being complicated and said that Thorne is on a similarly amoral path as Victoria. She suggests that because of these similarities her character is able to recognize "something really amiss" about Thorne. Lyle Masaki of AfterElton also noted similarities between the characters stating that they are "equally cool customers, equally matched and neither are completely sympathetic."

Like her father, she is incredibly intelligent and is capable of resolving complicated situations with great cleverness. She is also proficient in shooting and martial arts and speaks fluent French and Japanese. Emily does not kill her targets, although some of her actions have led to people dying at the hands of others.

"Illusion" reveals Emily's birthdate as June 11, 1984, making her 27–28 years old during the events of season 2, which takes place in 2012. She has a net worth of $1 billion, as stated on the show (although ABC.com's biography states that "only Emily Thorne knows").

== Character arc ==
=== Background ===
Her mother, Kara Wallace, was said to have died of illness when Amanda was five, although Amanda later discovered her mother isolated herself due to her psychological issues. David, who worked as a hedge fund manager at Grayson Global, was having an affair with his boss Conrad Grayson's wife, Victoria, and they were prepared to divorce their respective spouses to marry each other. During this time, Conrad Grayson, Victoria's husband, laundered money to a terrorist group, Americon Initiative, which they used to bring down Flight 197. Desiring to save themselves, Conrad and Victoria manipulated the evidence to point to David Clarke. The FBI arrested David for treason, while Amanda was taken into foster care for at least eight years, and she never saw her father again. She spent two years at Allenwood Juvenile Detention Center, until she was released to Nolan Ross, a friend of her father's, who informed her of the truth and gave her a wooden box of mementos from her father (dubbed the "Infinity Box"), along with 49% shares of stock in Nolan's computer software company, NolCorp, in which her father had invested. She has a tattoo on her wrist of a double infinity symbol, representing her father's love for "infinity times infinity", as he told her as a child. David had pleaded with her in his journals not to confront the true culprits behind Flight 197, but she refused to follow his advice. She spends several years researching the members of the conspiracy and creating an elaborate fake back-story by changing her name to the one of her former cellmate, to seek revenge.

=== Season 1 ===
The "Pilot" begins by showing the future "Fire and Ice" engagement party for Emily and Daniel Grayson, the son of Conrad and Victoria Grayson, taking place on Labor Day Weekend. All seems to be going well until a body assumed to be Daniel's is discovered on the beach by his sister Charlotte.

Five months before, Emily rents her childhood beach home and begins her revenge plan by destroying the careers and lives of the minor players in the conspiracy against her father, beginning with Lydia Davis, her father's secretary and Conrad's mistress. She saves Conrad and Victoria for last, and schemes to marry their son Daniel in order to have access to the Grayson family records.

Nolan Ross, a billionaire software developer and friend of David Clarke, recognizes Emily as Amanda and deduces her plans for revenge. He offers to assist her; she initially rejects him, but later counts on him as a trusted ally.

Daniel's college friend, Tyler Barrol, shows up in the Hamptons to stay with the Graysons. Emily is distrustful of him from the start, while Emily's friend and Victoria's event planner, Ashley Davenport, is smitten with him. When Lydia returns, determined to get her house and reputation back after her affair with Conrad was revealed, she blackmails the Graysons and Emily. Emily, however, sets her up to take the fall for her other takedowns, causing the Grayson head of security Frank Stevens to throw her off her balcony, although she survives.

Emily sends Conrad a video recording of the Frank and Lydia incident, which causes Conrad to fire Frank. As a result, Frank attempts to regain favor with the Graysons by digging into Emily's past. He discovers Emily's former cellmate, the real Emily Thorne who is posing as Amanda Clarke, but she murders him before he can warn Victoria. After "Amanda" alerts Emily to the killing, Emily sets up the Graysons for Frank's murder. Her attempts to send Amanda away fail, and her former cellmate stays in the Hamptons and becomes involved with Emily's old friend Jack Porter.

Tyler, meanwhile, becomes a larger problem, and Emily enlists Nolan to get rid of him, only for him to begin a romantic relationship with Tyler. Emily exposes Tyler's misdeeds, but Tyler ends up blackmailing Conrad when he tries to fire him. Emily steals the leverage Tyler has on Conrad, and Daniel evicts him from Grayson Manor. Daniel's birthday party later goes awry when Tyler appears and holds the party at gunpoint. Daniel and Jack get the upper hand and have Tyler arrested by the police.

Emily burns down the house of her third-from-last target Mason Treadwell, an author who wrote a faux tell-all about David Clarke, destroying his work. Before the fire, she steals several of his interview tapes, which reveal that Charlotte, the Graysons' daughter, is her biological half-sister. Emily uses this against Victoria, and Conrad threatens to expose this information in the midst of their divorce proceedings.

Emily returns home one day to find her Infinity Box missing. Tyler, who has escaped custody, reveals himself as the thief and that he has kidnapped Amanda. When Amanda turns on Emily, she enlists her mentor Satoshi Takeda for assistance at her engagement party. Takeda retrieves her Infinity Box and murders Tyler on the beach before fleeing with Amanda. Returning to the starting point of the pilot, the partygoers find that the body is not that of Daniel, but Tyler, and Daniel becomes the prime suspect. Emily discovers that Victoria hired a contractor named Lee Moran to attack Daniel in order to have him released on bail. Emily implicates Moran in Tyler's murder, and he is later found dead in prison, seemingly having committed suicide, although Emily discovers that Conrad contracted to have him killed by the same man as her father's killer.

Investigating her father's murder, Emily learns that Conrad often spoke with a "white-haired man", whom she discovers is her father's killer. She becomes determined to kill him. Victoria acquires immunity as she exposes Conrad to the SEC. She later hands evidence of David Clarke's innocence over to Daniel, only for Emily to steal it from Daniel's briefcase.

The white-haired man abducts Nolan. Emily rescues him and attacks the white-haired man, but she spares his life. Nolan hands Victoria's evidence over to the SEC, but as Victoria and Lydia come forward as witnesses, the plane carrying them to the hearing crashes, supposedly killing them and destroying the evidence. However, Nolan reveals that he copied a hard drive in Conrad's evidence, which contains a video that reveals Emily's supposedly deceased mother to be alive.

=== Season 2 ===
Emily in the second season premiere.

In the second season premiere, the Amanda (Jack Porter's boat) is shown as having sunk, with at least one casualty. Three months earlier, Emily returns to the Hamptons after a long absence and begins to investigate what happened to her mother, Kara Wallace Clarke. At a Memorial Day party, Charlotte tells Emily that Victoria isn't alive and in hiding before she is taken back to rehab at Conrad's doing. After Emily visits Victoria, she contracts the white-haired man to kill her.

Victoria double-crosses the white-haired man (Gordon Murphy), who was helping her and Charlotte to disappear, causing him to seek out Emily for assistance. She asks for information about her mother, but Murphy attempts to kill her again. He is killed by Emily's ex-lover Aiden Mathis before she can learn more.

Kara eventually resurfaces, but recognizes Amanda, not Emily as her daughter. Mason Treadwell also returns, and discovers the truth about Amanda Clarke only to be framed by Emily for Gordon Murphy's death. They strike a deal in which he will take the fall until Emily finishes her revenge, in exchange for the rights to her biography and an exoneration.

Emily assists Daniel in becoming elected CEO of Grayson Global. His victory draws out Helen Crowley from the Initiative. Emily abducts Crowley and Aiden and "dies" in an ensuing shootout in a ruse to make Crowley trust Aiden. Convinced that Victoria was involved, Crowley blackmails Aiden into killing her, though he discovers her leverage is false. Believing her to be a danger to Daniel, Victoria kills Crowley and leads the Initiative to believe that Amanda was behind her disappearance.

The Initiative's intentions soon become clear: with the use of Nolan's incomplete "Carrion" project, they will disable the power in Manhattan for their next attack. To this end, they hire a young woman named Padma Lahari to obtain it from Nolan, though they develop a relationship.

Emily learns that Conrad has bought half of the Stowaway, Jack's bar, and urges Amanda to buy it back. When Conrad refuses to sell it, Amanda uses Emily's laptop without her knowledge to blackmail him. Emily spots a man on the Amanda as it is leaving for Jack and Amanda's honeymoon. Nolan identifies him as Nate Ryan, a mobster with a vendetta against Jack. The two of them rescue Jack, though in an ensuing fight Nate destroys the boat and mortally wounds Amanda, who dies in Emily's arms on the water.

Her thirst for revenge reignited, Emily sets out to identify and locate both "the Fa1c0n", a hacker employed by the Initiative, and Patrick, the secret firstborn son of Victoria. Because of the Fa1c0n, Nolan is unable to locate Padma before she is killed by "Trask" from the Initiative. Emily, Nolan and Aiden avenge Padma by having Lee arrested by the FBI, and killing Trask.

As Daniel and Emily become re-engaged, Takeda returns with knowledge of the Initiative's next attack, but he is killed by Aiden in a battle. Afterwards, Aiden and Nolan bankrupt the Graysons against Emily's wishes, which activates the stolen Carrion program and shuts down the power across all of New York, commencing the Initiative's next attack.

Emily learns that Takeda was tracking an assassin named Gregor Hoffman, who she finds posing as an IT tech at Grayson Global. Conrad, who reveals to Victoria his role in the Initiative, attempts to have Jack killed. In the midst of his gubernatorial election speech, an explosion occurs close by at the company with Jack and Declan inside. Emily later learns that while Jack escaped before the explosion, Declan did not. Daniel sends the police after Aiden, suspecting he perpetrated the attack, though Nolan is arrested due to the Fa1c0n's tampering. Aiden's fate is left uncertain after Daniel is seen with a bloodied shirt following a confrontation. After Declan dies of his injuries, Jack attempts to murder Conrad as he is making his winning speech. Emily stops him by revealing that she is Amanda Clarke.

=== Season 3 ===
In the third season premiere, Emily is shown in a wedding dress on a boat. She turns around, and apologizes to an unknown person, before she is shot twice, causing her to fall into the water. Two months earlier, she returns to the Hamptons having spent six months away. Emily poisons Conrad, which causes him to be falsely diagnosed with Huntington's disease. Emily and Daniel set a date for their wedding: August 8 (double infinity), the day she destroys Victoria.

Emily destroys a new David Clarke conspirator, Paul Whitley, now a priest. However, she determines that he has atoned for his own sins, but is unable to undo her takedown. Feeling guilt, she requests his assistance in making Conrad confess to the conspiracy. Later, Emily pulls up to a crashed car on the side of the road and finds Whitley severely injured. After Whitley dies of his injuries, Emily suspects that Conrad murdered him, but discovers that the brakes on his car were tampered with. It is revealed that Patrick - who has reunited with Victoria - caused the accident in an attempt to kill Conrad and protect his mother.

Emily reveals her final plan to Nolan and Jack: fake her death, and frame Victoria for her murder on her wedding day. To keep Daniel in her grasp, Emily claims she is pregnant. Lydia Davis, thought to have died in the plane crash at the end of season 1, returns and uncovers evidence that Emily has plotted against them. Lydia shows this evidence to Victoria, derailing her plan. In an argument, Emily reveals that she is not pregnant. Daniel overhears this and shoots her off the boat in a drunken rage.

Barely surviving, Emily is discharged into Victoria's care, where she meets Niko, Takeda's daughter, who poses as her nurse. Niko has an agenda of her own, having come to the Hamptons to hunt down her father's killer. Emily initially plans to flee the Hamptons, but she changes her mind when she discovers that her injuries have sterilized her. She outs Lydia as her shooter to the press, blackmailing Daniel and Victoria to remain in the Grayson family. Daniel dates Sara and sits with her in bed to irk Emily, then Emily calls Sara's mom and after some disagreement Sara decides to leave. In a fit of rage Daniel attacks Emily grabbing her by the hair and pushing her onto the bed, he then says sterilising her was his gift to the universe. Aiden is abducted by Niko, who has discovered he killed her father, and she vows to kill Emily as revenge. Emily manages to defeat Niko in a difficult struggle, but spares her life.

Stevie Grayson, a lawyer, Jack's mother and Conrad's ex-wife, is summoned to the Hamptons by Emily. She offers her assistance in Emily's scheme and reveals the existence of evidence disks confiscated by her law firm. Jack steals them, and they are revealed to contain a letter written by Victoria's lover Pascal LeMarchal, mentioning Aiden's father. Further investigations lead Aiden to Oscar Chapman, a reporter in hiding from the Graysons. Chapman reveals that Trevor Mathis was killed by Pascal, who in the present day tracks down Chapman and silences him as well. Emily poses as a Homeland Security agent and wins Pascal's allegiance in extracting a confession out of Conrad. However, this goes completely awry when he is pushed into a helicopter blade by Conrad and killed instantly.

With all other options exhausted, Emily abducts Charlotte and holds her for ransom, but then releases her sister and has her extract a confession from Conrad, which is then broadcast on television. Conrad is arrested and David Clarke is finally exonerated. Dead set on destroying Victoria, Aiden goes to Michelle Banks, Emily's old therapist, but Victoria - now aware that Emily is Amanda Clarke - anticipates Aiden's visit, and murders him as revenge for Pascal's death. In her final revenge against Victoria, Emily has her committed to a psychiatric facility. Emily walks away as Victoria struggles and repeatedly screams that Emily is Amanda Clarke.

=== Season 4 ===
In the fourth season premiere, picking up six months following the events of "Execution", Emily has taken over Grayson Manor. Conrad was murdered and Victoria remains under psychiatric care, concluding her revenge. Despite this, she slowly begins to move on, but is galvanized back into action when Victoria escapes.

One night, a hooded man attempts to kill Emily, but is scared off by Nolan. They are unable to recognize the assailant. Asked to look at police suspects, Emily is astonished to see her father, David Clarke among them. David claims that he was held captive by Conrad and tortured. However, Emily finds evidence suggesting that this is untrue and that David murdered Conrad. Victoria's hold over David delays Emily reconnecting with him. She eventually reveals herself to David, but he is unwilling to sever ties with Victoria.

Two men attempt to abduct David, though Emily intervenes. David reveals that a rival of Conrad named Malcolm Black is hunting him. Emily discovers evidence that links him to FBI Agent Kate Taylor. Taylor approaches Emily and claims that Malcolm Black is holding her mother hostage. As they discuss how to dispose of him, Taylor reveals that not only is she his willing operative, but she is his daughter. The two women engage in a violent battle. Daniel, who happens upon the fight while on the beach runs to Emily's assistance only to be killed by Taylor. Jack kills Taylor moments later.

Emily and Jack dispose of Kate's body and stage the scene as if Emily killed Daniel in self-defense. Seeking revenge, Malcolm Black abducts Emily and Victoria. Both women overcome him as David, Jack and the police find them. Emily brawls with Malcolm, but he gains the upper hand. Before he can kill her, David shoots Black into a furnace, killing him. After this, Emily begins a relationship with Jack's partner and later detective, Ben Hunter.

Margaux LeMarchal, Daniel's pregnant girlfriend, repeatedly attempts to destroy Emily, culminating in a miscarriage. Feeling guilt, Emily changes her public narrative of Daniel's death to one closer to the truth and reveals her true identity to the world. After her reputation is publicly ruined, Victoria ends her own life by detonating Grayson Manor while inside, but leaves evidence suggesting she was murdered. Emily is arrested by the police.

Jack and Nolan arrange for Margaux's arrest, allowing Emily to interrogate her. Margaux reveals that Victoria is in fact alive. Emily conveys this information to Ben, who investigates the home of a deceased woman whose body was used in the "murder". He finds Victoria, but is murdered by an assassin Margaux hired, "White Gold".

Emily escapes to hunt down Victoria, discovering that she used her mother's body in the setup. White Gold stabs Jack, which pushes Emily to her breaking point. She confronts Victoria for the final time with the intention of killing her for her crimes. Before she can fire, David appears behind her and kills Victoria, who shoots Emily in the back before succumbing to her wounds. Emily barely survives with the help of a heart transplant, which is revealed in a recurring nightmare to have come from Victoria. It is left ambiguous as to whether this nightmare is real.

David, who has cancer, is released on compassionate grounds before dying of the disease. Months later, Emily marries Jack and they sail off on their honeymoon. In a voiceover, she remarks that karma spared her from suffering the consequences of her actions, and asks the viewer to consider her story as they embark on a journey of revenge of their own.

== Relationships ==
- Victoria Grayson - Emily detests and hates Victoria for her role in her father's downfall and wishes only to see her suffer, making her the ultimate target of her revenge. While Emily shows no trace of her negative feelings around Victoria, the two have a tense relationship throughout the series especially when Emily begins dating Daniel, Victoria's beloved son. Victoria's distrust of Emily goes as far as to suggest framing her for Tyler's murder because it was committed with her weapon, and contracting Gordon Murphy, who killed David, to kill Emily. Victoria later uncovers Emily's true identity and, feeling that she is responsible for the death of Pascal LeMarchal, murders Aiden. In retaliation, Emily leaves her in a mental institution. After six months, Victoria manages to escape and takes revenge on Emily by getting to her father first and feeding him lies. Emily admits that she has considered killing Victoria, but has not gone through with it because she had no intention of causing death and too many lives had been lost by that point.
- Charlotte Grayson/Clarke - Initially, Emily and Charlotte had no interactions, until Emily discovered Charlotte was her half-sister from Mason Treadwell's interview tapes, and they grow close. Charlotte becomes one of the few people Emily seeks to protect from her revenge scheme. Charlotte developed an addiction to oxycodone, and she attempted suicide in the first season finale, though Emily's reaction to this was never depicted. At one point, Emily attempts to console Charlotte on her porch swing by telling Charlotte a story she remembers from her childhood that she claims Amanda told her. Charlotte trusted Emily enough to tell her that Victoria was alive and in hiding. Emily is shown to realize the relationship she is missing with Charlotte by posing as the real Emily Thorne, and vice versa. When Charlotte announces her decision to change her surname to Clarke on her 18th birthday, Emily is seen smiling. Animosity develops on Charlotte's part towards Emily when she discovers her pregnancy was false, and continues in spite of Emily revealing her true identity as her sister. Charlotte is so angered that she subdues Emily in the Stowaway and sets it ablaze in an attempt to kill her. Emily decides to forgive Charlotte, who later calls on her for help when she accidentally kills a man she had slept with, who threatened her father. Taking Emily's advice, Charlotte leaves for rehab.
- Nolan Ross - Emily met Nolan when he released her from juvenile detention in 2002. He gave her the Infinity Box, which contained her father's possessions and proof of his innocence. Years later, when Emily returns to the Hamptons, Nolan offers his assistance, which she initially refuses. Despite being antagonistic with him at the start, Emily finds his technical genius and ability to be quite useful, though her plans put him in physical danger numerous times. She later warms to him and accepts him as a friend and trusted ally. Nolan also acts as her conscience and tries to reason with her when he feels she is taking things too far. Nolan considers Emily to be family, going so far as to give up Nolcorp, his company, to Grayson Global to prevent a forensic investigation that would expose Emily. Nolan affectionately refers to Emily as "Ems". Some fans support a romantic relationship between Nolan and Emily. While Gabriel Mann has entertained the prospect of "Nemily", creator Mike Kelley and VanCamp are opposed to the idea, considering Nolan and Emily to have a sibling relationship.
- Daniel Grayson- As part of her revenge scheme, Emily planned to seduce Daniel and marry him to gain access to Grayson Global, in order to find evidence of her father's innocence. However, this is complicated by real feelings that Emily develops for him. They become engaged midway through the first season, although Daniel's decision to conceal his father's part in framing David Clarke ruins her love for him. The engagement ends when Ashley tells Daniel she saw Emily and Jack kissing. However, Daniel never quite gets over Emily, and she still views him as someone useful. They reunite, with Emily asking to take it slow, although she has a dream at one point where they engage in passionate sex. They become engaged again in season 2 and marry in the first part of season 3. However, on their honeymoon boat Daniel discovers Emily has been using him and shoots her off in a drunken rage. Emily becomes sterile as a result of these wounds, but stays in the marriage through blackmail for a little longer. After Daniel learns Emily's real identity, they become cordially, if not exactly friendly. Daniel finally understands why she used him, although he still resents her. Daniel overhears Emily fighting with Kate Taylor and runs to her assistance, taking a fatal gunshot wound for her. In his final moments, Emily holds him and admits that despite all that happened everything that the two shared was real.
- Aiden Mathis - Emily met Aiden in 2006 at a New York nightclub when she was sent by Satoshi Takeda to access the kidnapper of Aiden's sister Colleen. Emily stops him from killing his sister's kidnapper twice and puts herself in physical danger to rescue him. Two years later, a flashback shows that Aiden was recruited by Takeda and that he and Emily had begun a relationship, a weakness Aiden exploited in their training. Aiden prepares to leave when Takeda locates his sister, and chooses to bring Emily, although he instead leaves her behind. This causes Emily to become embittered towards him in season 2, rejecting his attempts to reconcile. She eventually forgives Aiden and they rekindle their relationship. The two argue often, but have a deep love for one another. Aiden wishes for Emily to finish her revenge so that they can be together. This dream is shattered, however, when Victoria murders Aiden in cold blood.
- Amanda Clarke - "Amanda Clarke", or the real Emily Thorne, was Emily's cellmate in juvenile detention. Initially, the two often engaged in physical fights, although they later became friends at the suggestion of their warden. Emily visits her friend in juvie and they agree to switch identities in return for $500,000. Eight years later, "Amanda" reunites with Emily when she murders Frank Stevens after he discovers their secret. Amanda then begins to complicate Emily's plans by becoming involved with Jack Porter and thus endangering him to the Graysons. Though the two have a rivalry, Amanda stands by her vow to "do anything" for Emily. Tyler later kidnaps Amanda and turns her against Emily, although she ultimately remains loyal to Emily and disappears from the Hamptons for several months. By the time she returns, she is six months pregnant with Jack's child, which breaks Emily's heart. Amanda, freshly trained by Takeda as an asset to Emily remains loyal even after she nearly loses her baby in a fall. At her son's baptism, she notices Emily's misery and believes she deserves a family like hers, a claim Emily rebuffs. Amanda desired to confess her identity to Jack, feeling guilt for stealing him from Emily, although Emily advised against it. In her dying moments, Amanda returns a locket necklace that Emily gave her years ago and thanks her for giving her a "real family". Emily is incredibly devastated after Amanda's death, which fuels her to refocus her revenge back onto the Graysons.
- Kara Wallace Clarke - Emily had very few memories of her mother, who she believed dead of an illness unknown to her. After learning that she is in fact alive, Emily postpones her revenge plan and goes so far as to put Amanda's life on the line to locate her mother, only to be disappointed when she finally resurfaces. As a child, Kara's psychological issues led her to attempt to drown Emily, and to keep her from danger Kara left the Clarke family, David lying that she succumbed to her sickness. Despite Kara believing Amanda is her daughter, Emily attempts to build a friendly relationship with her mother through Amanda's son. Emily even visits Victoria to give her a wedding gift, which is really a ploy to see her mother for the "last" time. While she loves her mother, Emily knows that she is a danger to those around her and convinces her to leave the Hamptons after Aiden stops her from murdering the Graysons when she learns the truth about David. As Emily watches Kara leaving, she has a flashback where her mother sings to her as a child.
- Gordon Murphy - As the killer of her father, Emily resents Murphy. It did not appear as if Emily was interested in identifying her father's killer until she listened into a conversation between Murphy and Conrad Grayson, which revealed their involvement in David's murder. Deciding that she will kill Murphy, the only time she has ever expressed interest in murdering someone herself, she reveals herself as Amanda Clarke to him and is brought to his secret torture chamber, where they engage in a fight, though she chooses to honor her father by not going through with the killing. This in turn leads to the destruction of the evidence Emily had accumulated when Murphy detonates the plane carrying Lydia and Victoria. Although Murphy meets with the Graysons a few times after the fight with Emily, for unknown reasons he does not reveal her identity to them. In season 2, Murphy asks Emily for tapes that will exonerate him as the "kidnapper" of Victoria, but when she asks for her mother he attempts to kill her only to be killed by Aiden Mathis. Emily later learns that Murphy is her stepfather through marriage to Kara Clarke.
- Satoshi Takeda - Takeda recruited Emily after she was referred to him by Warden Stiles. From what has been seen thus far, it appears that while she could often be frustrated with Takeda, she still deeply respected him. In the present day, they have more differences and argue more often. Examples of this are when Takeda chastises her for being in love with Daniel and their fight in her home when he reveals he is Tyler's murderer and that he framed Daniel and Jack. At the start of season 2, after Aiden stops Emily from intentionally drowning (as a method of remembering her mother), Takeda disapproves of her desire to find her mother as it conflicts with revenge for her father. To this, Emily replies that after she learns her mother's fate, she will take down everyone who kept them apart, Takeda included. She also angrily thinks Takeda sent her a "nanny" in the form of Aiden when he comes to the Hamptons to help her. Takeda returns to the Hamptons months later and attempts to take Aiden away after revealing his past to Daniel, for which Emily scolds him. Takeda refuses to allow her and Aiden to help him prevent the Initiative's attack. In spite of Takeda's faults as perceived by Emily, she cries bitterly upon finding his body. Emily would later learn that Takeda was using her and Aiden to avenge the death of his fiancé, an unrecorded passenger on Flight 197.

== Reception ==
The choice of VanCamp to portray the character was generally well-received among critics, with Scott Pierce of The Salt Lake Tribune citing VanCamp's past involvement with Everwood and Brothers & Sisters as helping audiences contrast Thorne's sympathetic appearance with her ruthless pursuit of vengeance. VanCamp's portrayal of the character has been praised by several critics for how she has depicted Thorne's charming and duplicitous nature. Daniel Fienberg of HitFix has been more negative regarding the portrayal of the character. When the show premiered Fienberg stated that, while he was appreciative of VanCamp's work on other shows, he felt she was "passive" in the role of Thorne and that she portrayed the character as "robotically efficient", which made Thorne a less sympathetic character for him.

Catherine Weagle of the Salem State Log criticized VanCamp's portrayal, stating that Thorne's "revenge glare" was not sufficiently intimidating and also found it implausible that Thorne would be able to keep her true identity a secret. An initial review by Maureen Ryan of AOLTV was negative regarding the portrayal of the character, though Ryan faulted the premise of the show as making it difficult for VanCamp to portray Thorne realistically. Ryan became more positive about the character's portrayal as the show progressed stating that VanCamp had "made Emily more interesting than the character almost has a right to be."

Thorne's voice-over narrations during the show were described by Stephanie Goldberg of CNN as "insightful" and as being able to get the support of viewers, but other commentators have criticized the narrations as cliché and formulaic. Fienberg stated that the narrations were devoid of meaning and attributed it to ABC having "an in-house style that says that having your female lead narrate nothingness at the start of every episode is a worthy strategy", which he stated does not provide a good setting for a story about revenge.

Some critics favorably compared the role of Thorne on Revenge to that of Dexter Morgan on the Showtime series Dexter. Tierney Bricker of E! states that, like Dexter, Thorne captivates audiences even when they may not support her actions. In a review of the episode "Infamy" for ChicagoNow, Andrew Daglas noted the portrayal of Thorne burning down Treadwell's home in the episode and suggested that Thorne's actions would prompt audiences to question their sympathies for the character's pursuit of revenge. Daglas then states that the character of Dexter has prompted similar questions, adding that in both series the characters force viewers "to realize how easily our darkest impulses can bubble up to the surface, and how those impulses become more dangerous when they're wrapped in a nobler guise like justice."

== In other media ==
In early 2014, it was announced that Marvel Comics and ABC Studios had plans to jointly develop a comic book inspired by Revenge that detailed the origin of Emily Thorne. Co-authored by Ted Sullivan (a writer for the show) and Erica Schultz, and illustrated by Vincenzo Balzano, Dustin Nguyen, and Felix Ruiz, Revenge: The Secret Origin of Emily Thorne was published September 2, 2014. The story is set in Switzerland years before the events of the television series and follows Emily/Amanda on her first revenge mission, aided by her mentor Takeda. Marvel has stated that the comic's plot is considered canon.
