= Revenge season 4 =

Revenge
- Season 4
- DVD cover
- Starring: Madeleine Stowe; Emily VanCamp; Gabriel Mann; Nick Wechsler; Josh Bowman; Christa B. Allen; James Tupper; Karine Vanasse; Brian Hallisay; Elena Satine
- No. of episodes: 23

Release
- Original network: ABC
- Original release: September 28, 2014 – May 10, 2015

Season chronology
- ← Previous; Season 3

The fourth and final season of the ABC American television drama series Revenge premiered on September 28, 2014. This season saw several cast changes as both Barry Sloane and Henry Czerny's characters, Aiden Mathis and Conrad Grayson, were killed off in the Season 3 finale. This was the first season not to feature Czerny's character. James Tupper and Karine Vanasse, who played David Clarke and Margaux LeMarchal respectively, were upgraded to series regulars. The series stars Madeleine Stowe and Emily VanCamp as Victoria Grayson and Emily Thorne, respectively.

The principal cast were joined by two new series regulars: Brian Hallisay as Ben Hunter, an aspiring police detective and partner of Jack Porter, and Elena Satine as Louise Ellis, a wealthy heiress and patient at the local psychiatric hospital.

The season focuses on the revelation that David Clarke is alive and the continued feud between Emily and Victoria, who is now aware of Emily's true identity and is seeking her own revenge.

On April 29, 2015, ABC canceled Revenge after four seasons.

== Cast and characters ==
=== Main cast ===
- Madeleine Stowe as Victoria Grayson
- Emily VanCamp as Emily Thorne / Amanda Clarke
- Gabriel Mann as Nolan Ross
- Nick Wechsler as Jack Porter
- Josh Bowman as Daniel Grayson
- Christa B. Allen as Charlotte Clarke
- James Tupper as David Clarke
- Karine Vanasse as Margaux LeMarchal
- Brian Hallisay as Ben Hunter
- Elena Satine as Louise Ellis-Ross

=== Recurring cast ===
- Ed Quinn as James Allen
- Carolyn Hennesy as Penelope Ellis
- Nestor Serrano as Edward Alvarez
- Gail O'Grady as Stevie Grayson
- Courtney Ford as Kate Taylor
- Josh Pence as Tony Hughes
- Sebastian Pigott as Lyman Ellis
- Roger Bart as Mason Treadwell
- Tommy Flanagan as Malcolm Black
- Gina Torres as Natalie Waters
- Courtney Love as White Gold
- Tom Amandes as Lawrence Stamberg
- Daniel Zovatto as Gideon LeMarchal

=== Guest cast ===
- Yeardley Smith as Phyllis
- Kim Richards as Stephanie
- Yancey Arias as Tom Kingsley
- Adrienne Barbeau as Marion Harper
- Henry Czerny as Conrad Grayson
- Margarita Levieva as Amanda Clarke / Emily Thorne
- Hannah McCloud as young Louise Ellis-Ross
- Barry Sloane as Aiden Mathis
- Amber Valletta as Lydia Davis

== Broadcast ==
The season aired simultaneously on Global in Canada. In the United Kingdom, it premiered on E4 on January 5, 2015. Season 4 premiered in Ireland on RTÉ2 on January 6, 2015, with a double bill before settling into its regular slot two weeks later, and completed its run on May 19, 2015, with a double bill.

== Production ==
The fourth season began filming on July 11, 2014. Filming on the series finale ended on April 11, 2015.

== Episodes ==
No. overall	No. in season	Title	Directed by	Written by	Original release date	Prod. code	US viewers (millions)
67	1	"Renaissance"	John Terlesky	Sunil Nayar & Sallie Patrick	September 28, 2014	401	5.14
Emily, now living in Grayson Manor, decides to host the annual Memorial Day party, claiming her plans for revenge are over. However, Nolan isn't so sure she is ready to move on. Margaux confronts Daniel about why he left their partnership and he reveals that he was set up by Gideon. Jack has started a new career as a police officer after the charges against him for Charlotte's kidnapping were dropped, but Charlotte hasn't forgiven him. After Victoria finds a way out of the psychiatric institution Emily falsely had her committed to, she vows her own revenge at Grayson Manor, before being grabbed by David Clarke who has made a shocking return to the Hamptons.
68	2	"Disclosure"	Kenneth Fink	Joe Fazzio	October 5, 2014	402	5.27
After Charlotte discovers Gideon in bed with another woman, she attempts to take her own life and is found by Emily on the roof of a hotel. Charlotte is eventually tackled by Jack's new partner Ben, who also shows an interest in Emily. Following these events, Emily decides to reveal her true identity to Charlotte who reacts badly, feeling that her sister chose revenge over her family. Meanwhile, Victoria has trouble trusting David who, believing his daughter to be dead, wants to be a family with her and Charlotte. Victoria tells him they must first get rid of "Emily Thorne". Daniel and Margaux work together to remove Gideon from the company. Charlotte tricks Emily into meeting her at The Stowaway before knocking her out and setting the bar on fire, leaving her to die.
69	3	"Ashes"	Colin Bucksey	Alex Taub	October 12, 2014	403	4.66
Jack arrives in time to save Emily from the fire. Emily tells the police she was alone in the bar to protect Charlotte. Jack decides he doesn't want to rebuild the bar. Louise, who has been released from the hospital, tries to connect with Victoria. After she is rejected, she manipulates a chance meeting with Daniel. Charlotte finally meets her biological father but is troubled as Victoria continues to manipulate him against Emily. Fearing for Charlotte, David breaks into Grayson Manor to attack Emily but appears to recognize her before being chased out by Nolan, although they do not see his face. Victoria asks Margaux for a loan in order to bring herself and her family back to power.
70	4	"Meteor"	J. Miller Tobin	Karin Gist	October 19, 2014	404	5.00
Nolan goes against Emily's wishes and reports the break-in to the police. David purposely gets arrested for shoplifting so that his fingerprints reveal his identity. When asked to look through a line up, Emily finally discovers that her father is alive. Although initially worried, Victoria is surprised when it becomes clear the lengths David has gone to in order to protect himself and blame Conrad for his apparent death. Emily looks on as Victoria and Charlotte stand by David as his family during a press conference. Meanwhile, Louise continues to manipulate Daniel as he takes her on as his first "Wealth Management" client.
71	5	"Repercussions"	Kate Woods	Ted Sullivan	October 26, 2014	405	4.32
Emily wants to tell her father the truth about her identity but Victoria continues to keep them apart. Charlotte, still being manipulated by Victoria, continues on her downward spiral by introducing her father to his "grandchild" Carl. Jack angrily confronts her and tells her that she is worse than her mother. After speaking to Nolan and Jack, David begins to ask questions about Amanda and vows to uncover the truth. Emily realizes that before she can be with her father he needs time to heal and to be separated from Victoria, so she arranges for Margaux to give him the deed to his beach house. Margaux and Daniel's relationship becomes public knowledge, which angers Louise after she sleeps with him. An unknown man tries to run David over and is then seen taking an intoxicated Charlotte home.
72	6	"Damage"	John Terlesky	Christopher Fife & Sallie Patrick	November 2, 2014	406	4.67
While trying to escape, Charlotte accidentally kills her kidnapper. She discovers research on her father and calls Emily for help. After some tough love from her sister, including learning that her mother killed Aiden, Charlotte checks herself into rehab. David asks Nolan to support him during his live TV interview only to publicly accuse Nolan of stealing Amanda's inheritance. Victoria attempts to stop Louise from interfering with her family but Louise continues to assimilate herself into Daniel's life by befriending Margaux. Emily looks into her father's story and discovers he has been lying about how he escaped from jail and where he has been since.
73	7	"Ambush"	Hanelle Culpepper	Shannon Goss	November 9, 2014	407	5.26
As David continues to look into what happened to Amanda, Victoria spins more lies in order to keep him from the truth about his daughter. Nolan seeks refuge from recent media attention at his country club and decides to buy the business. After hallucinations of her mother motivate her, Louise attempts to kill Margaux. Daniel confronts Louise but refuses to drop her as a client, leading Margaux to discover that he slept with her. Emily suspects her father murdered Conrad and, while investigating, realizes that David has been watching her for years. Furious and confused as to why he never revealed himself, she confronts him with her true identity. Victoria attempts to flee but is electrocuted during a storm.
74	8	"Contact"	Paul Holahan	Joe Fazzio	November 16, 2014	408	5.23
After taking Victoria to the hospital, David and Emily finally confront one another and realize that they must accept the different people they have become. David reveals that a dangerous rival of Conrad's was responsible for his escape from jail. After thanking Emily for clearing his name, he tells her that he cannot act as her father until he has dealt with this rival. Unknown men attack David at the hospital, but Emily intervenes and later kidnaps one of them to interrogate. FBI agent Kate Taylor becomes involved and asks for Jack's assistance, which angers his partner Ben. After the end of his relationship, Daniel finally orders Louise out of his life and visits his mother, condemning her for her actions. Nolan agrees to Margaux's plea to hack Louise's sealed criminal records after she promises to repair his public image.
75	9	"Intel"	Wendey Stanzler	Karin Gist	November 30, 2014	409	4.08
After one of David's attackers appears to commit suicide in custody, Emily decides to investigate. Believing someone in power to be working against her father, Emily uses Ben's interest in her to gain information about his captain, Alvarez. As Victoria goes looking for answers regarding David, he eventually comes clean with his secrets, including the name of the man after him: Malcolm Black. Concerned she is losing David to his daughter, Victoria reveals Emily's true identity to one of Black's informants. This is revealed to be Jack's new love interest, FBI agent Kate Taylor. Meanwhile, Nolan backs out of his deal with Margaux as he feels guilty for betraying Louise, and Margaux reveals she is pregnant with Daniel's baby.
76	10	"Atonement"	John Terlesky	Ted Sullivan	December 7, 2014	410	4.60
A suspicious Emily asks Nolan to check out Kate's file and, with the results, uses Jack's help in order to get more information about her. Victoria meets Margaux, who reveals she is pregnant with Daniel's child. Daniel comes to terms with the truth about his family and acknowledges that he is ready to be a better person and a good father. Victoria reveals her betrayal to David, and the reason why. Kate confronts Emily during Nolan and Louise's party. Emily learns that Kate is the daughter of Malcolm Black and that she is being used as bait. When the two start fighting, Daniel tries to help Emily, but is shot by Kate. Having learned Kate's real identity thanks to Nolan, Jack arrives just in time and shoots her, saving Emily. Emily reveals to Daniel that she did have feelings for him before he dies in her arms.
77	11	"Epitaph"	Bobby Roth	Alex Taub	January 4, 2015	411	3.97
Emily, Jack and David agree to lie about Daniel and Kate's deaths in order to keep Malcolm Black out of their lives. Emily tells the police that Daniel arrived drunk and attacked her, so she was forced to shoot him in self-defense. Victoria, already devastated by Daniel's death, reluctantly agrees to go along with the story. David dumps Kate's body in Miami while Nolan and Jack clear out her hotel room to lead Malcolm off the trail. Margaux refuses to believe Emily's story and bans her from Daniel's funeral. Ben is also suspicious but after Emily reveals her guilt over the way she treated Daniel, believes her story. David reveals his plan to kill Victoria to Emily. Meanwhile, Malcolm arrives in the Hamptons and kills Captain Alvarez.
78	12	"Madness"	Matt Shakman	Sallie Patrick	January 11, 2015	412	3.67
Flashbacks reveal that Malcolm Black, believing David to be a terrorist, saved his life and recruited him. When David attempted to reach out to his daughter, Malcolm threatened to kill her unless David killed another man. When Louise's brother Lyman comes to town, Nolan arranges a dinner for him along with Louise and Emily. After looking into Louise's criminal record and seeing her become unbalanced at dinner, Emily investigates the prescription she is taking and discovers that Louise's family has been drugging her in order to control her inheritance. After Malcolm visits Jack at home to question him on Kate's whereabouts, Jack sends Carl away for protection and goes to David, who reveals he plans to meet and kill Malcolm. He tells Jack about a flash drive that has evidence against Malcolm should he fail. Jack, in an attempt to save David's life, hands the evidence in to the police, only to discover (as forewarned by David) that it was found to be insufficient and Malcolm has been promptly released. Victoria is forced to tell Margaux the truth about Emily's identity and Ben overhears their conversation. Emily discovers that Victoria sent Kate after her the night Daniel died and confronts her, but Malcolm, having been released from the police, captures them both, now knowing who Emily really is.
79	13	"Abduction"	John Scott	Christopher Fife	January 18, 2015	413	4.09
Ben confronts Jack with his knowledge of Emily's identity and agrees to help him take down Malcolm Black. After discovering that Malcolm is holding Emily and Victoria captive, David manages to convince him that Kate is alive using pieced together voicemails. Meanwhile, Emily and Victoria work together in order to send David and Jack a clue to their whereabouts. When Malcolm finds out Kate is dead, he shoots David in the leg and tells him he will kill Emily in front of him. Victoria saves Emily by taking the blame for Kate's death, which gives Jack and Ben time to arrive and help David kill Malcolm. Victoria tells David she knows he was planning to kill her but that she will do nothing to stop him and Emily having a life together. Meanwhile, when Louise's mother arrives in town, she and Nolan get married in order to take her rightful inheritance. Her mother tells Louise that she fed her the pills to stop her remembering the truth about killing her father. Margaux declares vengeance on Emily for the pain she has caused and hires a private investigator to gather evidence against her.
80	14	"Kindred"	Colin Bucksey	Nancy Kiu	January 25, 2015	414	3.76
Emily throws Louise and Nolan a wedding reception and also helps Louise uncover the truth about her father's death. The couple confront Penelope with a police report proving her involvement in the death and banish her from the Hamptons. Louise also decides to cut off her brother's campaign which has been funded by her inheritance. Victoria enters into a power play with Natalie Waters, a new Hamptons resident, who appears intent on stealing her social crown. David asks his daughter to give up "Emily Thorne" and become Amanda again, but she tells him she isn't ready. Jack, uncomfortable with the attention from his recent rescue of Emily and David, decides to quit his job as a police officer. Margaux continues to seek revenge against Emily but questions what to do when evidence appears that would implicate Jack. Ben and Emily move forward in their relationship and Victoria receives a phone call informing her of "a death in the family".
81	15	"Bait"	Ty Trullinger	Shannon Goss	March 8, 2015	415	4.89
Victoria discovers that Conrad's father has died and expects to be given his fortune. She is shocked to discover, however, that it has all been left to his new wife – Natalie Waters. Victoria intends to contest the will with the help of Lyman, who offers to help in order to gain funding for his political campaign. After learning that Margaux is in possession of a tape incriminating Emily and Jack, the pair team up with Nolan and Louise to destroy the evidence and outsmart her. Furious at being tricked, Margaux threatens Ben with information regarding his ex-wife in order to get him to help her. Meanwhile, Natalie and David make contact and Jack reveals his true feelings to Emily who tells him she cannot be with him.
82	16	"Retaliation"	Alrick Riley	Jesse Lasky	March 15, 2015	416	4.78
Margaux blackmails Ben into giving her Emily's birth certificate by threatening to reveal his ex-wife April's location to the criminal looking for her. Ben, however, has already turned to Emily and Nolan, who help him track down April and manage to get the man after her arrested. Natalie shows her true colors to David by revealing that she was really Conrad's mistress and that she starved his father in order to gain his fortune. Victoria, temporarily working with David, manages to catch her out and receive her rightful inheritance. Lyman attempts to mend bridges with Louise but, after she allows him to stay with her, is revealed to be working with Margaux. When Louise catches him stealing information from Nolan's computer, a fight ensues, ending with Lyman falling from a cliff to his death. Louise hides the truth from Nolan, claiming that her brother is knocked out drunk. Margaux pays off police officers to stop Jack for drunk driving, leading to his arrest and his son being taken away.
83	17	"Loss"	Helen Hunt	Joe Fazzio	March 22, 2015	417	4.42
Emily brings in Stevie to defend Jack against his DUI and they work with Nolan to save their friend. They discover that Margaux has bribed the judge, so Emily blackmails her by having her caught driving under the influence using the same drug that was used to frame Jack. The charges are dismissed. Victoria is upset to learn that Margaux voted down her plan to have a new hospital wing named after Daniel. Margaux explains that she is worried that if she announces her pregnancy, her baby's life will be affected by his father's reputation. They vow to continue working on clearing Daniel's name. Emily plans to retaliate against Margaux but David forces her to see reason by telling her that unless she offers peace her fight will never end. She attempts to call a truce with Margaux who refuses and is hit by a cab as she walks away. In the hospital, Margaux tells Victoria that she has lost the baby and that Emily pushed her. Meanwhile, Ben looks into Lyman's death and Louise is relieved when it is ruled an accident, whilst Nolan becomes interested in a social worker named Tony.
84	18	"Clarity"	Allison Liddi-Brown	Karin Gist	March 29, 2015	418	4.22
Margaux has a change of heart and calls off the hit she placed on Emily, but must go directly to the woman hired to do the job. The assassin, alias White Gold, tells Margaux that they now have a problem as she knows her real identity, information which Margaux uses to blackmail her into staying away. Victoria blames Emily when the hospital board rescinds their offer to name a new research wing after Daniel. Emily, feeling guilt over the loss of Margaux's baby, decides to try and clear Daniel's name. She asks Jack for help but Stevie tells her to leave him out of her plans. Ben and Nolan also attempt to discourage her, the former upset that she wouldn't discuss her plans with him as they are dating. Meanwhile, Nolan attempts to go on a date with Tony but his marriage to Louise complicates matters. His situation is made worse when she tells him she wants a baby. Although she calmly agrees to end their marriage, Louise becomes angry when she overhears Nolan telling Jack that he pities her. Emily attends the groundbreaking ceremony of the new hospital wing and, with Jack by her side, finally reveals her true identity as Amanda Clarke.
85	19	"Exposure"	Jennifer Wilkinson	Wilson Pollock & Andrew Steier	April 12, 2015	423	3.84
Finally abandoning her persona of Emily, Amanda looks to her future, with this episode looking back over her relationships with those around her, her childhood and her time in the Hamptons seeking revenge. Along with her father, she contacts those she has taken down to prevent them ruining her image and chances of freedom. She must also deal with Ben who is angry that he must deal with Internal Affairs due to his involvement in covering up the truth the night Daniel was killed. Later, Amanda gives an exclusive interview to discuss why she took on the identity of Emily Thorne. Whilst doing so, she admits to lying to those around her in order to protect her secret and reveals the truth behind Victoria's involvement in her incarceration as a child and Aiden's death. Meanwhile, Nolan realizes that Louise has stolen information regarding "Emily's" identity and actions over the years and passed it on to Victoria who is planning on taking Amanda down. After witnessing the interview, Margaux admits to lying about being pushed in front of the car but vows to help Victoria with her case against Amanda. In the final moments, a mystery person is seen circling Amanda's face in the newspaper.
86	20	"Burn"	Kenneth Fink	Ted Sullivan	April 19, 2015	419	3.90
Stevie helps Jack move on by having Carl's birth certificate changed to reflect his mother's real name. Jack decides to leave the Hamptons and move to Los Angeles with Carl and his mother. Meanwhile, David reveals to Stevie that he has been diagnosed with cancer but is yet to tell Amanda. Nolan's relationship with Tony continues to develop despite Louise's efforts to interfere. Victoria is attacked and believes it was Amanda looking for evidence. Following this, Margaux encourages Victoria to hand the evidence over to the FBI, but Amanda is able to intercept and destroy it. Believing she is finally free of revenge, Amanda attempts to stop Jack from leaving, but in doing so upsets Ben with her true feelings and is ambushed by Mason Treadwell. In the final moments, Victoria is seen setting fire to and blowing up Grayson Manor while still inside.
87	21	"Aftermath"	Rob J. Greenlea	Shannon Goss & Christopher Fife	April 26, 2015	420	4.45
Amanda arrives to discover the remains of Grayson Manor just as Margaux and Louise find a suicide note from Victoria. Jack, who is in Los Angeles with Carl and Stevie, sees a news report about the explosion and calls Nolan to confirm that Amanda was not involved. Meanwhile, Mason demands that Amanda clear his name which she does by creating a fake paper trail implicating Conrad in the death of Gordon Murphy. Louise refuses to believe that Victoria would kill herself and soon after finds the door to Victoria's home broken and blood on the wall. The police open a homicide investigation, which leads to Ben questioning Amanda and Jack. During this interview, Jack discovers that Amanda chose him and tried to stop him from leaving. Amanda finally discovers her father has cancer and only a short while to live. After trying to contact Mason to confirm he was with her when the manor was destroyed, Amanda discovers that he and Victoria worked together to frame her by planting false evidence, which results in her arrest. Elsewhere, Tony ends his relationship with Nolan, wanting to focus on being a better father as the adoption he'd applied for came through sooner than expected.
88	22	"Plea"	J. Miller Tobin	Alex Taub	May 3, 2015	421	4.82
Amanda is granted bail under house arrest but immediately starts planning a way to track down Mason and prove her innocence. With Nolan's help, she is able to find his last location and discovers he was staying with a "regal" looking woman before the cops arrive to put her back in prison. Meanwhile, after realizing that Margaux helped Victoria with her plan, Jack is able to have her arrested for theft, giving Amanda a chance to get the truth from her. Amanda tries to convince Ben of Victoria's plan but he refuses to believe her. Elsewhere, having spoken to Charlotte and Nolan, Louise begins to doubt Victoria. When she finds evidence (the hoodie worn by Victoria's attacker) she hands it over to Ben, who begins looking into Amanda's story. He finds Victoria alive but is killed by White Gold who had been ordered to stop him by Margaux. Later, David reveals his cancer has spread and that he only has six months to live.
89	23	"Two Graves"	John Terlesky	Joe Fazzio	May 10, 2015	422	4.80
Amanda confesses to the murder of Victoria Grayson in order to be moved to a high-security prison so that Nolan can plan an escape. Meanwhile, Victoria reveals to Margaux that the body she used to fake her own death was that of her mother, who died of natural causes. When the pair realize Amanda has escaped, they call upon White Gold to take care of her. However, after Jack is seriously wounded in an attack made by White Gold, Nolan convinces Margaux to help him capture the assassin. After they are successful, Margaux decides to admit to her part in Ben's death to atone for her sins. Victoria goes to her own funeral for a final look at her children and is devastated when neither attend. She decides to reveal herself to Louise, who has made a heart-breaking eulogy, but Louise, disgusted by the woman she once idolized, betrays her to Amanda. When the two women come face to face, Amanda prepares to shoot her enemy. David appears and kills Victoria to protect his daughter, but not before Amanda is shot and critically wounded. Several months later, David succumbs to his illness and dies peacefully during a winter snow. Amanda makes amends with her sister Charlotte before marrying Jack. The pair leave the Hamptons in their new boat, left to them by David. Amanda, after having a nightmare where Charlotte has Victoria's heart donated anonymously to replace Amanda's wounded heart, admits she'll never be able to fully forget about Victoria and the consequences of her search for revenge. In the final scene, Nolan is approached by a young man asking for help to free his mother who has been wrongly imprisoned. In a final narration, Amanda declares her quest for revenge has ended thanks to her father's eternal love.

== Ratings ==
No. in series	No. in season	Title	Air date	Rating/share (18–49)	Viewers (millions)	DVR (18–49)	DVR Viewers (millions)	Total (18–49)	Total viewers (millions)
67	1	"Renaissance"	September 28, 2014	1.3/4	5.14	0.9	2.91	2.2	8.05
68	2	"Disclosure"	October 5, 2014	1.3/4	5.27	0.8	—N/a	2.1	—N/a
69	3	"Ashes"	October 12, 2014	1.2/3	4.66	0.9	—N/a	2.1	—N/a
70	4	"Meteor"	October 19, 2014	1.3/4	5.00	0.8	—N/a	2.1	—N/a
71	5	"Repercussions"	October 26, 2014	1.1/3	4.32	1.0	2.76	2.1	7.08
72	6	"Damage"	November 2, 2014	1.2/4	4.67	1.0	2.88	2.2	7.54
73	7	"Ambush"	November 9, 2014	1.3/4	5.26	1.0	2.75	2.3	8.01
74	8	"Contact"	November 16, 2014	1.5/4	5.23	1.0	2.72	2.5	7.95
75	9	"Intel"	November 30, 2014	1.0/3	4.08	1.0	3.06	2.0	7.14
76	10	"Atonement"	December 7, 2014	1.2/3	4.60	0.9	2.73	2.1	7.32
77	11	"Epitaph"	January 4, 2015	0.9/3	3.97	0.9	2.54	1.8	6.50
78	12	"Madness"	January 11, 2015	0.8/2	3.67	1.0	2.76	1.8	6.43
79	13	"Abduction"	January 18, 2015	0.9/3	4.09	0.9	2.54	1.8	6.62
80	14	"Kindred"	January 25, 2015	0.9/3	3.76	0.9	2.57	1.8	6.32
81	15	"Bait"	March 8, 2015	1.1/3	4.89	0.9	2.46	2.0	7.35
82	16	"Retaliation"	March 15, 2015	1.1/3	4.78	0.7	2.37	1.8	7.15
83	17	"Loss"	March 22, 2015	1.1/3	4.42	0.8	2.45	1.9	6.87
84	18	"Clarity"	March 29, 2015	1.0/3	4.22	—N/a	—N/a	—N/a	—N/a
85	19	"Exposure"	April 12, 2015	0.9/3	3.84	—N/a	—N/a	—N/a	—N/a
86	20	"Burn"	April 19, 2015	1.0/3	3.90	0.8	2.32	1.8	6.23
87	21	"Aftermath"	April 26, 2015	1.0/3	4.45	0.8	2.19	1.8	6.65
88	22	"Plea"	May 3, 2015	1.2/4	4.82	0.7	—N/a	1.9	—N/a
89	23	"Two Graves"	May 10, 2015	1.3/4	4.80	—N/a	—N/a	—N/a	7.243
