= List of Revenge characters =

This is a list of the characters featured on ABC soap opera Revenge created by Mike Kelley and stars Madeleine Stowe and Emily VanCamp.

== Cast timeline ==
Main cast (opening credits)
Recurring guest star (3+ episodes)
Guest star (1–2 episodes)

Actor	Character	Season			
Actor	Character	1	2	3	4
Main cast members
Madeleine Stowe	Victoria Grayson	Main	Main	Main	Main
Emily VanCamp	Emily Thorne	Main	Main	Main	Main
Gabriel Mann	Nolan Ross	Main	Main	Main	Main
Henry Czerny	Conrad Grayson	Main	Main	Main	Guest
Ashley Madekwe	Ashley Davenport	Main	Main	Guest	Archive
Nick Wechsler	Jack Porter	Main	Main	Main	Main
Josh Bowman	Daniel Grayson	Main (Note: Bowman departs in "Epitaph" (episode 4.11).)	Main	Main	Main
Connor Paolo	Declan Porter	Main	Main		Archive
Christa B. Allen	Charlotte Grayson	Main (Note: Allen departs in "Damage" (episode 4.6) but returns as a guest star for "Plea" (episode 4.22) and "Two Graves" (episode 4.23).)	Main	Main	Main
Barry Sloane	Aiden Mathis		Main (Note: Initially recurring, Sloane joins the main cast from "Sacrifice" (episode 2.14).)	Main	Archive
James Tupper	David Clarke	Recurring	Recurring	Guest	Main
Karine Vanasse	Margaux LeMarchal			Recurring	Main
Brian Hallisay	Ben Hunter				Main (Note: Initially recurring, Hallisay joins the main cast from "Contact" (episode 4.8).)
Elena Satine	Louise Ellis				Main (Note: Initially recurring, Satine joins the main cast from "Bait" (episode 4.15).)
Recurring cast members
Amber Valletta	Lydia Davis	Recurring		Recurring	Archive
Brian Goodman	Carl Porter	Recurring	Guest		
Max Martini	Frank Stevens	Recurring			
Ashton Holmes	Tyler Barrol	Recurring			
Margarita Levieva	Amanda Clarke	Recurring	Recurring		Archive
Roger Bart	Mason Treadwell	Recurring	Recurring	Guest	Recurring
James Morrison	Gordon Murphy	Recurring	Recurring		
Cary-Hiroyuki Tagawa (Note: The character is initially played by Hiroyuki Sanada in the first season, before being replaced by Cary-Hiroyuki Tagawa for season two.)	Satoshi Takeda	Recurring	Recurring		
Jennifer Jason Leigh	Kara Clarke		Recurring		
Dilshad Vadsaria	Padma Lahari		Recurring		
J. R. Bourne	Kenny Ryan		Recurring		
Wendy Crewson	Helen Crowley		Recurring		
Michael Trucco	Nate Ryan		Recurring		
Justin Hartley	Patrick Osbourne			Recurring	
Annabelle Stephenson	Sara Munello			Recurring	
Stephanie Jacobsen	Niko Takeda			Recurring	
Gail O'Grady	Stevie Grayson			Recurring	Recurring
Olivier Martinez	Pascal LeMarchal			Recurring	Archive
Henri Esteve	Javier Salgado			Recurring	
Daniel Zovatto	Gideon LeMarchal			Guest	Recurring
Nestor Serrano	Edward Alvarez				Recurring
Carolyn Hennesy	Penelope Ellis				Recurring
Courtney Ford	Kate Taylor				Recurring
Tommy Flanagan	Malcolm Black				Recurring
Sebastian Pigott	Lyman Ellis				Recurring
Gina Torres	Natalie Waters				Recurring
Ed Quinn	James Allen				Recurring
Courtney Love	White Gold				Recurring

== Main ==
Grayson family tree

Maxwell Harper (1930s–2004)	Marion Harper (1938–2014)	Edward Grayson (1932–2014)	Natalie Waters (1960s–)
Kara Wallace (1961–)	David Clarke (1961–2014)	Victoria Grayson (1958–2014)	Conrad Grayson (1955–2013)	Stevie Pruitt (1950s–)	Carl Porter (1960–2011)	Carl Porter's wife
Jimmy Brennan (1950s–2013)
Emily Thorne (Amanda Clarke) (1984–)	Charlotte Grayson (1994–)	Patrick Osbourne (1974–)	Daniel Grayson (1987–2014)	Amanda Clarke (Emily Thorne) (1985–2012)	Jack Porter (1984–)	Declan Porter (1994–2012)
Carl David Porter (2012–)

Name	Actor/Actress	Starring Seasons	Recurring/Guest Seasons	Appearances	Status
Victoria Grayson	Madeleine Stowe; Grace Fulton (child)	1, 2, 3, 4	—N/a	89	Deceased
Madeleine Stowe Victoria Grayson is the wealthy and powerful matriarch of the Grayson family, wife of Conrad Grayson, mother of Patrick, Daniel and Charlotte. After having an affair with David Clarke, Victoria reluctantly agreed to help Conrad and Frank frame him to cover up their crimes. Victoria and Conrad's marriage deteriorates steadily, and the couple begin divorce proceedings. Despite not knowing Emily's true identity, Victoria never entirely trusts her and attempts to sabotage Daniel and Emily's relationship. During difficult times for her family, Victoria occasionally asks Emily for assistance, severing contact when Emily has fulfilled her usefulness.
Amanda Clarke/Emily Thorne	Emily VanCamp; Emily Alyn Lind (child); Alyvia Alyn Lind (child)	1, 2, 3, 4	—N/a	89	Alive
Emily VanCamp Amanda Clarke is the daughter of David Clarke and Kara Clarke. Amanda returns to the Hamptons under a new identity, Emily Thorne, a wealthy socialite dedicated to charity work, to exact revenge on the people responsible for her father's death and wrongful conviction for terrorism. As a youth, she spent time in a juvenile detention center, unaware of her father's innocence until her release when Nolan Ross approaches her. He tells her that her father was framed and presents her with her father's share of NolCorp, 49% of the closely held stock, a result of her father's funding the company's start-up. After realizing that Nolan is telling the truth, she decides to clear her father's name. She undergoes training with Takeda, during which time she meets and has a relationship with Aiden Mathis. Their relationship ends when he abandons her after agreeing to take her with him. She makes preparations for her return to the Hamptons – trading identities with her former cellmate in juvenile detention, as well as taking notes on Daniel Grayson. After arriving in the Hamptons, Emily buys her father's former house next door to the Graysons and becomes romantically involved with Daniel in order to get closer to his family. She accepts his marriage proposal, but their relationship falters as Daniel grows more like his relatives. They break off the engagement after she kisses Jack. After learning that Charlotte is her half-sister, Emily chooses to protect her from her revenge against the Graysons, although she does use her to take Conrad down.
Nolan Ross	Gabriel Mann	1, 2, 3, 4	—N/a	89	Alive
Gabriel Mann Nolan Ross is a computer genius and Emily's wealthy ally with a cocky attitude and poor social skills. After dropping out of college, Nolan co-founded Nolcorp, a software company, with David Clarke. Nolcorp became a great success, making Nolan the sixth youngest billionaire on Forbes list and a well-known celebrity. Grateful to David, Nolan offers to help his daughter. Emily is initially reluctant to trust him and tries to repulse him through intimidation or use of force. Over time, however, she accepts his involvement in her activities. Nolan is Emily's first port of call when she needs a computer or cell phone hacked, an anonymous email sent, something decrypted, or something doctored. Their relationship develops to the point that in Season 3, Emily buys Nolan a new house and Nolan walks Emily down the aisle at her wedding. They repeatedly talk about trusting each other and discuss the morality of their actions. Nolan is also very generous towards the Porter family, helping them financially and otherwise. In season one, he helped Porters keep their bar during a period of financial troubles, paid Declan's tuition and even offered to help them keep their house. His efforts in matchmaking between Jack Porter and Emily often trigger Emily's wrath. Nolan is bisexual; although he often hits on women at Grayson parties (much to Ashley Davenport's chagrin), he had a relationship with Nolcorp's former CFO, Marco Romero, for many years until 2006. He had a brief relationship with Tyler Barrol in the first season, with his new CFO, Padma Lahari, in the second season, and with Patrick Osbourne, Victoria's illegitimate son, in the third season. Although Ashley has made it a priority to get closer to rich men and women, she and Nolan cannot tolerate each other; she sums up her opinion of him as a "perennial pain in the arse" while he calls her "fun police". Nolan is a target of physical aggression more than anybody else in the series. In season one, he is attacked by Emily (twice), Frank Stevens, Tyler Barrol, Jack Porter and Gordon Murphy. In "Two Graves", he is stabbed in the hand by White Gold but manages to stun her with a taser before she can kill him. In the season 2 finale, Nolan – like David Clarke – is framed by the Initiative (a terrorist organization) for terrorist attacks and is arrested. In season 3, however, it is revealed that Nolan installed a failsafe in the program that led to his arrest, enabling the FBI to (off-screen) shut down the Initiative. In the series final episode, "Two Graves", after helping Amanda/Emily get her revenge, Nolan is approached by another person looking for revenge.
Conrad Grayson	Henry Czerny	1, 2, 3	4	67	Deceased
Henry Czerny Conrad Grayson is the current CEO of Grayson Global, as well as David Clarke's ex-boss. He is the husband of Victoria, and the father of Daniel and Charlotte. Conrad was involved in laundering money for the Americon Initiative, which used the money in a terrorist attack that brought down a plane. After the disaster, Conrad worked with Frank and a reluctant Victoria to frame her lover, David Clarke. His affair with Victoria's best friend, Lydia further damages the couple's strained relationship and leads to divorce proceedings. Initially close to his daughter, Conrad is devastated when a DNA test reveals that she is not his biological child. He exposes Victoria's past extramarital affair with David Clarke at a family dinner and blackmails her current lover, Dominik, into leaving her. In the first season finale, Conrad warns Victoria not to get on a plane, but she appears to disregard him. After the plane is destroyed, he believes Victoria has died but she eventually calls him to ask for help with Murphy. Conrad helps Victoria with a scheme to make it appear she was kidnapped and held hostage by Murphy. He eventually asks Victoria to remarry him, explaining that it will prevent them from having to testify against each other. At their second wedding, Conrad is arrested, wrongly, for the murder of Gordon Murphy. Helen, a member of the Initiative, arranges his release on bail. However, after Daniel takes Conrad's place as CEO of Grayson Global, the Initiative destroys all ties with Conrad, and focus on Daniel. Conrad is also revealed to have had a tryst with Ashley Davenport.
Charlotte Grayson	Christa B. Allen	1, 2, 3, 4	—N/a	70	Alive
Charlotte Grayson is the youngest child of David Clarke and only daughter of Victoria Grayson. Named by Victoria after David Clarke's aunt, she is the younger half-sister to Patrick Osbourne, Daniel Grayson, and Amanda Clarke. Charlotte has a perfect academic record, though is often truant. Believing Conrad to be her father, Charlotte is shocked when he reveals that she is in fact the result of an affair between Victoria and David. Charlotte is the only person to whom Victoria reveals her status after her plane explodes. Charlotte bonds with Emily, unaware that she is her half-sister and instead believing Amanda is while unknowingly helping Emily in her revenge. Charlotte also develops romantic relationships with Adam Connor and Declan Porter. Following the turbulent end of her relationship with Declan in season one, they gradually become friends and lovers again. Throughout the second season, Charlotte attempts to destroy ties with her family and live with the Porters, though she still (reluctantly) attends some Grayson parties. Despite Victoria's constant belittling of Amanda, Declan and Emily, Charlotte believes they offer love that she does not find in her family. At the end of the second season, Charlotte discovers she is pregnant with Declan's baby, though her future intentions following Declan's death are unclear. She has indicated sadness at the idea of her baby being born into the Graysons. By season 3, it is revealed that Charlotte suffered a miscarriage and lost the baby. Charlotte begins to take a dislike to Emily, believing that she is becoming more like a Grayson. She forms a bond with Jack, helping him with the bar. She later discovers that Conrad was responsible for Declan's death, making her leave him. Charlotte tries to break Daniel and Emily apart by secretly arranging for Daniel to get back together with his former girlfriend, Sara. In season 4, Charlotte met her biological father, David Clarke for the first time and also found out that Emily is the real Amanda Clarke. After finding out that Victoria killed Aiden Mathis she leaves to go to rehab but tells Daniel that Emily is Amanda Clarke before she leaves. Christa B. Allen has stated on Twitter that Charlotte is "gone for good". However, in late March 2015, Allen posted on Instagram a photo of a Revenge script, indicating her return later in the season. Charlotte returns in the final two episodes. She reconciles with Emily and attends Emily and Jack's wedding.
Jack Porter	Nick Wechsler; Nicholas Stargel (child)	1, 2, 3, 4	—N/a	89	Alive
Nick Wechsler Jack Porter is Amanda's childhood friend, and the half-brother and legal guardian of Declan Porter following their father's sudden death. He becomes the boyfriend and later husband of Amanda Clarke. He takes over The Stowaway, which had been owned by his father Carl, following Carl's death. Jack is one of the three men for whom Emily has feelings (the others being Daniel and Aiden), and Jack holds feelings for Emily in return. These feelings culminate in them kissing after watching Sammy, the dog owned by both of them at different points in time, die. However, they are unable to get closure from the kiss because of Amanda's return. In Season 2, Jack becomes a father when Amanda gives birth to their son, whom they name Carl David Porter, after Carl, Jack's father, and David Clarke, Amanda's "father". On their honeymoon, they are held hostage by Nate Ryan; though Jack escapes, Amanda is killed on their boat by Nate despite Emily's attempt to save her. Amanda's death causes Jack to seek revenge on Conrad for ordering her murder, and he grows distant from Emily and Nolan when he believes they are lying, and when Emily becomes re-engaged to Daniel. To this end, he works together with Ashley Davenport to destroy Conrad's gubernatorial campaign, though Conrad soon learns of their deceit and attempts to kill Jack by leading him to Grayson Global, where The Initiative's bomb plot is being set in motion, although Jack escapes before the bombing. Declan, who was in the building when it exploded, dies, devastating Jack and pushing him to attempt to assassinate Conrad at the election. Before he can shoot, Emily stops him by revealing her true identity. In season 3, Jack returns to the Hamptons, six months after learning the truth about Emily, and gives Emily an ultimatum: end her plotting by the end of summer, or he will expose her secret. Charlotte and Jack form a friendship during the season. Jack later meets and begins a relationship with Margaux LeMarchal. He also learns that his father kept his mother's identity a secret from him. In Season 4 Jack joins the Suffolk County Police Department, and dates Katherine Black (daughter of Malcolm Black), but was forced to kill her when she tried to kill Emily. Soon after, Jack quit the police force and confessed his feelings to Emily, but she was already with Ben, Jack's police partner. Jack and Emily get together in the series finale, and get married.
Daniel Edward Grayson	Josh Bowman	1, 2, 3, 4	—N/a	78	Deceased
Josh Bowman Daniel Edward Grayson is the eldest son of Conrad and Victoria Grayson, half-brother to Charlotte and Patrick. Daniel is a student at Harvard, and later business partner of Conrad. He returns home for the summer to see his family and later meets and falls in love with Emily Thorne. After dating for a while, he proposes to her and the two become engaged. At their engagement party, he is attacked by a former friend, Tyler Barrol, and is forced to shoot him before being knocked out, later revealed to be Satoshi Takeda, who finishes off Tyler. Daniel is framed and charged with the murder of Tyler Barrol, but is exonerated, due to Conrad arranging a cover-up. After Conrad tells Daniel the real story of David Clarke, Daniel chooses to stand by his father and take over the company, instead of expose the truth. During season 1, Daniel is thrice led to accuse Emily of cheating on him with Jack Porter, despite not being true. On the third occasion, which occurs at the season finale, Emily - who is disgusted by Daniel's choice of standing by his father - terminates the engagement. In Season 2, Daniel is in a relationship with Ashley Davenport and is slowly distancing himself from his father. He succeeds in taking Conrad's position at Grayson Global, unaware of the existence of the Initiative or the threat it presents. Upon discovering Ashley in a hotel room with an investor, he breaks up with her, threatening the businessman with blackmail. He gradually falls for Emily again and resents Aiden's close relationship with the socialite. Daniel fires Aiden when it is revealed that his father put the bomb on flight 197. Daniel is the only one Charlotte confides in about her pregnancy. After the bombing of the Grayson Global building in New York, Daniel learns that Conrad knew about the bombing and that it was part of the Initiative's plan, which angers him as he leaves the company and steps down as CEO. By season 3, Daniel goes into business with a woman named Margaux and continues his romance with Emily and plans their wedding. But problems arise, including the untimely arrival of Sara, the girl who he had paralyzed in a car accident. Daniel and Emily marry in episode 10 of season 3. But during the honeymoon trip, he overhears Emily and Victoria talking about how Emily faked her pregnancy; angered, he shoots Emily, although she survives. Daniel revives his relationship with Sara and has an affair with her. But the relationship ends after Emily manages to use Sara's mother to make her leave Daniel once more. After Emily's secret about faking the pregnancy is exposed to the public, intentionally done by Emily, Daniel manages to divorce her. Throughout the rest of Season 3, both Daniel and Emily are openly cold and hostile towards each other. By the end of the season, Daniel is framed for the murder of a young woman by Gideon, Margaux's brother, who wants to it as leverage to make Daniel give up his position to him. In Season 4, Daniel has hit rock bottom, due to Conrad's crimes being exposed and him now being the son of the most "hated man in America", along with being forced out of his job position by Gideon. Margaux finds out about what Gideon did and helps Daniel get revenge against him, well also eliminating the leverage simultaneously. The two start a relationship afterwards. Wanting to rebuild himself, Daniel begins working for Louise Ellis, but ends up having a one-night stand with her, which causes Margaux to leave him. Daniel later learns that Margaux is pregnant with his child, forcing him to realize and acknowledge the wrongs of his family, and his life, allowing him to come to terms with everything that has happened and vowing to change his life. Daniel manages to win back Margaux, after some help from Victoria. In episode 10, Daniel was killed by Malcolm Black's daughter, Kate Taylor after trying to save Emily from getting shot. Daniel's death is turned into a cover-up in order to keep Malcolm from taking revenge on the death of his daughter, who was killed by Jack Porter during the incident. The media believes that Daniel tried to attack Emily in a drunken-rage, although the police never found alcohol involved, and Emily was forced to shoot him in self-defense. After Malcolm is killed, Emily clears Daniel's name in the episode "Clarity", changing the story that it was Malcolm who attacked her and that Daniel was killed well trying to protect her from being killed, reasoning that she covered it up to make sure everyone else she loved was safe.
Ashley Davenport	Ashley Madekwe	1, 2	3	44	Alive
Ashley Madekwe Ashley Davenport is the Grayson family employee and one of Emily's closest friends. Through season one, Ashley becomes jealous of Emily, who had won over the heart of Daniel Grayson and later got engaged to, even attempting to gain the trust of Victoria Grayson by betraying her, but is unsuccessful. Initially working as Victoria's party planner and assistant, Ashley becomes the Grayson family spokesperson during Daniel's murder trial. After Daniel's exoneration, Ashley is employed by Conrad to work at Grayson Global and also serves as Emily and Daniel's wedding planner. After seeing Emily and Jack Porter kissing, Ashley uses the information to her advantage and tells Daniel, who breaks off the engagement with Emily, resulting in the two beginning a relationship. In Season 2, Ashley and Daniel continue their romance, against Conrad Grayson's wishes. Ashley's backstory is revealed as once having been an escort, who was almost forced into the sex trafficking business, only to be saved by Emily Thorne, though she does not know it was Emily who saved her. When Ashley becomes a problem for Emily, Emily sends a scandalous video to Victoria of Ashley's tryst with Conrad, which Victoria uses to force Ashley to seduce Salvador Grobet for his vote to Conrad, which in turn leads to Daniel learning of Ashley's double-crossing and the ending of their relationship. She then forces herself back into the Grayson family by blackmailing Conrad in order to work for him during his gubernatorial campaign. Ashley later takes part in helping Jack with his revenge plan against Conrad near the end of the season, but that plan ultimately fails. In the season 3 premiere, Ashley has been fired by Conrad, who knew of her involvement with Jack's failed revenge plans. Ashley tries to blackmail Emily into helping her stay in the Hamptons by introducing her to rich men. Emily, seeing Ashley as a threat, frames her for reporting false claims against Victoria, which results in Emily and Victoria teaming up to force Ashley to leave the Hamptons for good.
Declan Foster Porter	Connor Paolo	1, 2	—N/a	43	Deceased
Connor Paolo Declan Foster Porter is Jack Porter's younger half-brother. During the engagement party, he and Charlotte - with whom Declan is romantically involved - witness a blue-hooded man on the beach, whom they believe to be involved in the murder. Declan is shocked when he learns the man's identity - his brother. When the prosecution subpoenas Declan to Daniel's trial, Charlotte tries to seduce him into telling the truth, but Declan reveals that Charlotte was on painkillers and alcohol the night of Tyler Barrol's murder and says there was no hooded man, effectively ending their relationship. After he befriends a girl, named Jamie, Charlotte targets her for revenge against Declan, further estranging the former couple. In Season 2, Declan takes on greater responsibility at the bar and becomes friends again with Charlotte. Declan is the father of Charlotte's unborn baby and dies at the end of Season 2 when his artery ruptures during surgery to repair the injury he sustained from an explosion.
Aiden Mathis	Barry Sloane	2, 3	—N/a	43	Deceased
Aiden trained alongside Emily under Takeda. They met when their missions conflicted in their search for a Russian gangster. Aiden believed the man to be responsible for the disappearance of his sister while Emily was under orders from Takeda to apprehend him. After shooting the gangster, Aiden returned to Takeda's training with Emily. Eventually the two became involved in a romantic relationship. Despite promising to take Emily with him, he left without her to find his sister. When Gordon Murphy attempted to kill Emily, Aiden killed him. Emily rejected Aiden's attempts to reconcile, but at the end of "Penance" he came to check on her and they rekindled the spark. Since then, they have shared many tender moments. Daniel, unaware of the plots in which the two conspire, has been working with Aiden to replace his father as CEO of Grayson Global. He also views Aiden as a competitor for Emily's attention. Later, Daniel finds out that Aiden's father, Trevor Mathis, was a baggage handler suspected of putting a bomb on "Flight 197". Daniel fires Aiden and then they become enemies competing for Emily's heart. This leads to a fight between the two of them in the season finale resulting in what appears to be Aiden's murder. Aiden later returns in season 3, revealing that he survived a gunshot wound from Daniel. He continues to work alongside Emily in her revenge against the Graysons, even pretending to help Victoria for her. In the season 3 finale, Victoria suffocated him with a pillow until he died.
Margaux LeMarchal	Karine Vanasse	4	3	42	Alive
The only daughter of French Media Mogul Pascal LeMarchal, Margaux LeMarchal is introduced in the third season as being a childhood friend of Daniel Grayson. Despite being the eldest LeMarchal child, Pascal often passed Margaux in favor of her younger half-brother, Gideon. Margaux has struggled her whole life to earn her father's respect, so she moves to the Hamptons to escape his disapproval and establish her own magazine, "Voulez". She hires childhood friend and ex-flame Daniel as her business partner and agrees, at his request, to keep the magazine's headquarters in the Hamptons. Margaux meets Jack Porter through Charlotte and they soon started dating, but the relationship falls apart through Daniel's manipulations and attempts to sabotage Jack's friends. When Pascal arrives in the Hamptons, Margaux fears that he will undermine all of her hard work and resorts to blackmail to keep her father from taking control of her magazine. Despite this, Margaux and Pascal reconcile, and he names her as the successor of his multibillion-dollar media empire shortly before his mysterious death. In Season 4, Margaux is pregnant with Daniel's child, and now wants revenge on Emily, whom she blames for Daniel's death, succeeding Malcolm Black as the main antagonist of Season 4. Emily tries to make peace with Margaux, but Margaux does not accept Emily's attempt and instead is hit by a taxi, killing Daniel's child and leading to the reignition of the feud between Emily and Victoria. Margaux later works with Victoria and the assassin White Gold, but decides to allow herself to be sent to prison for her crimes rather than have the evidence destroyed of her actions.
David H Clarke	James Tupper	4	1, 2, 3	42	Deceased
David H Clarke is the presumed deceased father of Emily Thorne (birth name Amanda) and Charlotte. A successful Grayson Global hedge fund executive and devoted father to Amanda, he has a relationship with the married Victoria Grayson after his marriage with Kara Wallace falls apart. After a terrorist attack brings down a plane, David is framed for the crime by Conrad, Frank, and Victoria, as well as other friends and colleagues he trusted. He is arrested and imprisoned for life on charges of terrorist conspiracy and mass murder. Clarke becomes the most hated man in America—a viewpoint Emily is determined to change. He only met Charlotte once when she was a baby and suspected that she is his child because Victoria named her after David's aunt. Gordon Murphy, an operative of the Americon Initiative, stabs and presumably kills Clarke during a prison riot. Until the season 3 finale, David appears only in flashbacks or video recordings. In the season 3 finale, however, David is shown to be alive and stabs Conrad and leaves him for dead. In Season 4, David returns to the Hamptons and kidnaps Victoria. He takes her to an underground cell and asks Victoria if she betrayed him. Victoria admits she did, but only because Conrad threatened her. David says Amanda is dead and he wants to get to know Charlotte. He also admits he killed Conrad to protect Victoria and Charlotte. Victoria turns David on Emily by blaming her for her misery and not telling David that Emily is the real Amanda Clarke. Emily eventually tells David the truth just as Malcolm Black, the man who held David captive for all those years, closes in on them. David wants to handle the situation himself and asks Emily to stay out of it, but Victoria gets her involved. The result is the deaths of both Daniel and Kate, Malcolm's daughter. David convinces Victoria to hide Kate's death and make the official story that Emily shot Daniel in self-defense. David tried to set a trap for Malcolm, but fails; and Malcolm comes to the Hamptons to find out what happened to Kate. In the end, David ends up killing Malcolm by shooting him until he falls into an incinerator. David later learns he has terminal cancer and kills Victoria to spare Amanda having to do it. While he is charged with the murder, he is granted compassionate release due to his terminal diagnosis and dies at home with Amanda by his side.
Benjamin Hunter	Brian Hallisay	4	—N/a	21	Deceased
Benjamin Hunter is Jack's partner on the police force, Ben greatly covets the investigation of Conrad's murder, hoping to get a promotion if he solves it, and resents Jack when he and Kate Taylor solve the case together. He is interested in Emily Thorne, and they go on a date. Chief Alvarez agrees to give Ben a promotion, but is murdered by Malcolm Black that night. Ben takes Margaux to the hospital, when she collapses and overhears Victoria telling Margaux that Emily is really Amanda Clarke. Emily and Ben get closer when she helps him protect his ex-wife, April, from a dangerous man. They break up After Emily reveals the truth behind Daniel's death to the world because she didn't think of how her confession would impact Ben's career since he investigated Daniel's death. When Emily is framed for Victoria's murder, Ben has a hard time trusting Emily due to her past lies. When Louise brings evidence that Emily could be telling the truth, Ben decides to investigate Emily's theory. Ben finds Victoria alive, but he is murdered by White Gold before he can report it.
Louise Virginia Ellis	Elena Satine	4	—N/a	21	Alive
Louise Virginia Ellis is a young woman who was committed to a mental institution by her mother. She befriends Victoria and develops an unhealthy obsession with her. Louise hires Daniel to "protect her interests" and has a one-night stand with him. After hallucinating about her mother, Louise tries to kill Margaux by locking her in the steam room. Louise tries to have another tryst with Daniel, hoping to get pregnant, so she can get closer to Victoria. While drowning her sorrows, Louise meets Nolan and they become friends. Louise is horrified when Emily and Nolan reveal that her family has been drugging her. Penelope, Louise's mother, comes to the Hamptons and threatens to cut Louise off if she crosses her. As a result, Nolan, who found a loophole in Penelope's control over Louise's trust fund, decides to marry Louise. Penelope tells Louise that if she steps out of line she will tell everyone that Louise killed her father, but that turned out to a lie as it was Penelope who killed Louise's father and then had the truth buried and pinning the murder on Louise. Nolan and Emily helped Louise discover that the police report on Louise's father's death was faked and procure the real, buried police report written by the officer reporting to the scene the night the murder was committed. Armed with this knowledge, Louise stood up to her mother and kicked her and her brother, whom was in on it in order to secure Louise's trust fund for his own selfish uses, out of her life. Louise's brother is hired by Margaux to get information on Emily, but he falls to his death during a struggle with Louise. Nolan and Louise's marriage crumbles due to his interest in a guy, and they divorce. After Emily reveals that she is Amanda Clarke, Louise joins forces with Margaux to help Victoria take Amanda down, but is the odd woman out when Victoria and Margaux plot to frame Amanda for Victoria's murder. Louise is left to mourn for Victoria, and is devastated when she learns the full extent of Victoria's plan. She leads Amanda to Victoria, and later is seen at Amanda and Jack's wedding.

== Recurring cast ==
- Margarita Levieva as Emily Rebecca Thorne (Season 1, 2): She switched identities with the original Amanda Clarke, whom she befriended in juvenile detention. After Frank threatens to reveal the secret, Amanda kills him and calls Emily, who takes her to her home in the Hamptons. Although she considers Emily her "sister", Amanda is uncertain if Emily genuinely cares about her and begins to feel used. After Amanda finds Tyler's body at the beach, Takeda drives her away and trains her to be an asset for Emily. In the season 1 finale, Amanda returns heavily pregnant. Uncertain about her baby's paternity due to a one-night stand after leaving the Hamptons, Amanda asks Emily to ensure that the paternity test names Jack as the father. Although the test reveals the father is indeed Jack, Emily claims to Amanda that she was forced to rig the test. Emily later admits the lie and apologizes to Amanda. who apologizes for beginning a relationship with Jack while knowing that Emily had feelings for him. Although often reluctant, Amanda usually agrees to Emily's requests for help. She is injured in a confrontation with Victoria and, not long after, gives birth to a son, Carl. Although Amanda wishes to confess the identity switch to Jack, Emily dissuades her, saying it will break his heart. Amanda is killed in an explosion while on her honeymoon with Jack. Emily considers Amanda "one of the only people that I ever loved".
- Jennifer Jason Leigh as Kara Clarke-Murphy, maiden name Wallace (Season 2): Emily Thorne's mother. She is first mentioned in episode 8, season one, where Emily says "Kara" was her mother's name. Due to a mental illness (for which she takes fluphenazine), Kara is responsible for nearly drowning her daughter as a child. Horrified by her actions, Kara asks David to tell her that she died. They are separated for two decades, during which Kara marries Gordon Murphy, David's killer. Unaware of the identity switch, Kara goes to see the injured Amanda at the hospital, where she also encounters Emily, who introduces herself as Carl's godmother. Saying that Kara may be a danger to Carl, Emily tells Amanda to send her mother away but after Kara breaks down and asks for forgiveness, Amanda agrees. Kara later asks Emily if Amanda truly forgives her – Emily replies that she wants to. Kara is last seen driving to Colorado Springs in a car provided by Emily and Aiden following her attempted execution of the Graysons.
- Amber Valletta as Lydia Davis (Seasons 1, 3): Victoria's best friend, David Clarke's former secretary, and Emily's first target for revenge. After her affair with Conrad Grayson is exposed, her relationship with Victoria collapses. Lydia nearly discovers Emily's secret in a photograph from a New Year's Eve party at which Emily was a waitress, though before she can investigate further, Frank Steven throws her off her balcony into the street below. After she awakens from her coma, Emily doctors the photo and wards off the suspicion. Lydia is announced killed in a plane explosion in the first season's finale; however, she appears in the eighth episode of the third season. She has been hiding since the plane explosion. She contacts Margaux, telling her that she will give her information on Conrad. Conrad and Lydia reconcile, but he sends her away when Victoria plots to frame her for Emily's shooting.
- Ashton Holmes as Tyler Barrol (Season 1): Daniel's friend and college roommate from Harvard, who comes to the Hamptons to gain a position with Grayson Global alongside Daniel. He attempts to network with the business elite in the Hamptons and briefly dates Ashley Davenport, but for several episodes maintains a sexual affair with Nolan. Tyler seems to be infatuated with Daniel and tries to sleep with him, and he also attempts to sabotage his relationship with Emily. He and Daniel compete for a job at Grayson Global. Tyler later discovers Emily's secret and the truth about David Clarke. He attempts to murder Daniel so that he can frame Emily for the deed but is killed by Satoshi Takeda. Tyler's murder and subsequent investigation is a major story arc during season 1.
- Max Martini as Frank Stevens (Season 1): Graysons' head of security and Emily's fifth target. He worked alongside Conrad to frame David Clarke. Frank also murdered Roger Halsted (David's close friend) and attempted to murder Lydia Davis to keep the duplicity a secret. He developed romantic feelings for Victoria as her relationship with Conrad started to unravel. Emily used the last two to undermine Conrad's trust in him and prompting Conrad to fire him. Frank uncovers Emily's secret but is killed by Amanda before he can alert anyone, leaving Victoria with a clue: "Emily Thorne is not who she claims to be." Later, when the police recount the sentence to Emily and Daniel, she gives an alternative interpretation.
- Hiroyuki Sanada (Season 1) and Cary-Hiroyuki Tagawa (Season 2) as Satoshi Takeda: The powerful CEO of Takeda Industries in Japan and the mentor of Emily and Aiden in their quests for revenge. In season 1, Takeda murders Tyler on the beach during Emily's engagement party and implicates Daniel and Jack in the murder, in an attempt to frame them so they will be jailed and Emily will no longer be distracted, although Emily exonerates them and instead frames Lee Moran. Takeda also takes Amanda away for several months after the murder to train her as an asset to Emily. In season 2, Tagawa took over the role from Sanada, who was unable to continue due to scheduling conflicts. Takeda is killed through stabbing by Aiden in self-defense when Aiden threatens to reveal his separate agenda: avenging his deceased fiancé Mai Aoki, an unrecorded flight attendant on Flight 197.
- Roger Bart as Leo Mason Treadwell (Season 1–4): A famous author who first appears in episode "Infamy" #1.12 in Season 1. He interviewed the Clarkes on suspicion that David was framed for the bombing of Flight 197. While he knew David was innocent, the Graysons bribed him off to back their story in his novel by portraying David as a "paranoid sociopath" who was guilty of his crimes, which caused a young Amanda Clarke to believe her father was guilty of downing Flight 197. When Mason is distracted, Emily gets her revenge against him in an arson attack by breaking into and setting fire to his house; thus destroying his life's work, including all of his first edition books and manuscripts. She also steals his interview tapes, which reveal Charlotte's true paternity. Later in the season, during Daniel's trial in episode "Doubt" #1.17, Mason returns to write a blog about it, having been manipulated by Emily into believing that Victoria was the one who burned down his home, that Amanda killed Tyler, and that Charlotte's claim of Jack being on the beach was false. In Season 2, he returns to interview Kara Clarke, only to discover that Amanda is lacking scars from the fire she set in foster care. After stopping Amanda from killing Mason, Emily double-crosses him into confessing to the murder of Gordon Murphy, and in return, he will have the rights to Emily's biography and release from prison when her revenge against the Grayson family is complete. It is later revealed that he purchased letters authored by David from Meredith Hayward, which were destroyed in the fire, but he remembers a crucial detail: the existence of Patrick Harper, Victoria's secret son. In Season 3, Mason threatens to expose Emily and her schemes against the Graysons, so she breaks him out of prison and fakes his death, forcing him to go into hiding. In season 4, Mason returns once more to the Hamptons, after Emily revealed her identity as Amanda Clarke to the world, and he helps Victoria fake her death and place the blame on Emily, getting his own personal revenge against her. The plans fails in the end, but Mason escapes and his whereabouts are unknown by the end of the series.
- James Morrison as Gordon Murphy, the "white-haired man" (Seasons 1-2): An operative of the Americon Initiative as well as an associate of Conrad's, Murphy is responsible for the deaths of David Clarke, Lee Moran and John McGowen. Emily becomes determined to track down Murphy so that she can kill him. After being spared by Emily, he destroys a plane on which Victoria is on, but decides to help her fake her death and plans to help her and Charlotte disappear. However, when Victoria can't come up with the money to pay him, she double crosses Murphy by having Conrad beat her, and makes it look like Murphy kidnapped and tortured her. With no other option, Murphy goes to Emily in order to obtain evidence against Victoria, and tries to kill her once she hands it over, only to be killed by Aiden Mathis. Emily later uses his body to frame Mason Treadwell for his murder. It's later revealed that Murphy was married to Kara Wallace Clarke and therefore is Emily's step-father. During season 4, David Clarke turns out to be alive, having been saved from death by an arms dealer named Malcolm Black.
- Dilshad Vadsaria as Padma Lahari (Season 2): An employee at Nolcorp whom Nolan hires to be his new CFO. They begin a romantic relationship, but it becomes strained after she investigates David Clarke's involvement in his company. She is later revealed to be working with Helen Crowley to retrieve Carrion, one of Nolan's early projects, for the Initiative. In exchange, her father, who has been held hostage by the Initiative, will be set free. Nolan discovers her ties to the Initiative, which she admits, but she states that she legitimately loves him. While carrying out a plan with Nolan and Aiden, she hands over Carrion to Trask but is then kidnapped. Six weeks later, she and her father are killed by Trask, but not before they force her to film a video in which she claims Nolan "is Americon Initiative", which they later use to frame him for the destruction of Grayson Global.
- Michael Nardelli as Trey Chandler (Season 2): A rich boy from Collins Prep who helps Kenny Ryan gain co-ownership of the Stowaway. Declan stole his phone and used it to set up a meeting between Jack and Kenny.
- J. R. Bourne as Kenny Ryan (Season 2): A man whose house Declan breaks into (it is later revealed he isn't the owner of the house). Kenny becomes a partner in running the Stowaway. It is later revealed that he and his brother Nate want revenge because they believe Carl Porter had murdered their father. When the real killer confesses, Kenny decides to leave the Porters alone. He meets with Jack and gives him recordings of Conrad and Nate's conversations.
- Wendy Crewson as Helen Crowley (Season 2): an operative of the Americon Initiative. She intended to use Daniel for another terrorist attack, like Flight 197. When Daniel wins the CEO election at Grayson Global, Helen warns Victoria and Conrad to not alert Daniel of the plan(s) to use him. When Victoria ignores the threat and warns Daniel, Helen attempts to arrange for his death, although Victoria gets the upper hand and kills Helen in her poolhouse. It is later revealed that Daniel was never in danger as Conrad became part of the Initiative after Helen bailed him from jail when he was framed by Emily for Gordon Murphy's murder.
- E.J. Bonilla as Marco Romero (Season 2): NolCorp's former CFO. Revealed that he had a romantic relationship with Nolan for many years till 2006, when he accused Nolan of embezzling funds that had been set aside for Amanda (the money did in fact reach the real Amanda, which of course Marco was unaware of). Marco's refusal to trust Nolan in this matter led to Nolan ending their relationship and firing him. As NolCorp was about to go public, this turn of events ruined Marco's career. Six year later, Daniel brings him into Grayson Global to dig up secrets in NolCorp. He later returns to work for Nolan, but is later fired when Nolan suspects him of leaking information to Daniel. Marco is the only one of Nolan's known relationships to have ended over mundane issues (in this case, trust): Tyler turned out to be a violent psychopath, Padma was murdered by the Initiative, and Patrick was forced to flee after attempting murder.
- Michael Trucco as Nate Ryan (Season 2): Kenny's younger, and more dangerous brother. He and Kenny came to the Hamptons seeking revenge for the murder of their father, who they believed was Carl Porter, and they targeted his sons. Even after the real killer confessed, Nate stayed in the Hamptons to operate his own agenda. He made a deal with Conrad that was thwarted by Amanda. Nate stowed away on Jack's boat and took him and Amanda hostage during their honeymoon. Emily arrived to help, and she and Nate struggled over the gun. Amanda shot Nate in the back, but Nate triggered an explosion, killing himself and Amanda.
- James McCaffrey as Ryan Huntley (Season 1): Victoria's lawyer in her divorce from Conrad, who aids her in several illegal actions to undermine Conrad's position in the settlement. Ultimately, the loss of trust in each other results in Victoria firing him. Huntley was also David Clarke's defense attorney. Although he initially appears to be a potential target for Emily, it is later revealed they are working together, Huntley having believed Clarke was innocent the whole time.
- Merrin Dungey as Barbara Snow (Season 1): Conrad's lawyer in his divorce from Victoria.
- Collins Pennie as Eli James: Emily's foster brother from an orphanage that both he and Emily grew up in during most of their childhood. Charlotte got in contact with him and he came to the Hampton' to visit Amanda's grave. After encountering Emily, he quickly figured out she was Amanda and wanted to help her. They teamed up to take revenge on their foster mother, and it was revealed that he had started the fire and let Emily take the blame. Eli left the Hamptons soon after, but not before being the catalyst for Emily to learn about Patrick Osbourne's existence.
- Burn Gorman as "Mr. Trask" (Season 2): a member of the Initiative who takes over Helen's duties after her murder at Victoria's hands, and the murderer of Colleen Mathis. He appears at the Graysons' Labor Day party to interrogate them about Helen's disappearance, though they lead him to believe that Amanda murdered her after Victoria handed over her "evidence". Trask does not buy this, especially when the news that Amanda was killed on her honeymoon breaks. He sends Padma Lahari her father's finger as proof that he is alive and demands that she hand over Carrion. Trask kidnaps her in the exchange before Aiden can kill him from afar and forces her to go on record claiming Nolan is "the Initiative". Six weeks later, he kills the Laharis before Aiden can rescue them. Upon seeing Padma's corpse, Aiden kills Trask by snapping his neck, avenging the Laharis and Colleen. Aiden mentions that Trask is "at the bottom of the East River."
- Seychelle Gabriel as Regina (Season 2): A classmate of Charlotte's from Collins Preps, who befriends Charlotte. She had a crush on Charlotte and unsuccessfully tried to break Charlotte and Declan up.
- Justin Hartley as Patrick Osbourne (Season 3): Victoria's illegitimate son, whom she gave up for adoption when she was sixteen. Patrick is an artist. By the time season 3 starts, Patrick has been living in the Hamptons for several months and has developed a close bond with Victoria but is reviled by Conrad. Daniel and Charlotte also dislike him, but they grudgingly accept him into their lives as time goes on. Patrick and Victoria open an art gallery together in the Hamptons, in an effort to bond and to secure Victoria's financial independence. Nolan, initially unaware of his connection to Victoria, develops an interest in Patrick and tracks down his ex-wife and pays her to tell him Patrick's dirty secrets, of which there seem to be none. Nolan makes a move on him, but Patrick, having been warned about Nolan by Victoria and his ex-wife, rejects him. After Nolan apologizes and Victoria advises him to make decisions that make him happy, however, Patrick and Nolan spend the night together in defiance of Victoria and Emily. He flees the Hamptons when Jack reveals to Conrad learns that it was Patrick (not Charlotte, as Victoria had led him to believe) who sabotaged his car. Conrad tracks him down to Manhattan and convinces him to return to the Hamptons to persuade Victoria to attend Daniel and Emily's wedding. To ensure that Patrick doesn't get on the boat for the after party (which would ruin the endgame of Emily's plan), Nolan reveals that he knows about the sabotage and tells Patrick that he loves him and is willing to protect him. After accidentally killing his biological father, Patrick decides to leave the Hamptons. In season 4, Patrick doesn't show up for Victoria's funeral.
- Annabelle Stephenson as Sara Marie Munello (Season 3): Daniel's ex-girlfriend who became paralyzed when he crashed his car. She made a full recovery and went to work at a bakery. Charlotte ran into her and inadvertently got her fired, so she hired Sara to cater Emily and Daniel's wedding hoping that she could break Emily and Daniel up. Though Sara was very resentful towards Daniel, she fell back in love with him. She became Daniel's mistress when she learned Emily had faked a pregnancy, but after an argument with her mother, she left Daniel for good. Sara's brother Patrick made a brief appearance in Season 1 when he trashed Daniel's car as revenge for what happened to Sara.
- Stephanie Jacobsen as Niko Takeda (Season 3): Takeda's daughter who became Emily's personal nurse while she was recovering from being shot. Niko vowed to avenge Takeda's death by killing Aiden, but she was stopped by Emily.
- Gail O'Grady as Stevie Grayson (maiden name Pruitt) (Seasons 3-4), Conrad's first ex-wife, and Jack's biological mother, who left when he was a baby. Conrad brings Stevie back to the Hamptons hoping to use her to kick Victoria out of Grayson Manor, but Stevie throws him out as well. Conrad convinces her to give him the deed to Grayson Manor. She also reconciles with Jack and is revealed to be a former alcoholic. She briefly becomes an ally of Emily's before she leaves the Hamptons. Stevie returns to help Jack when he is arrested for drunk driving. She becomes disillusioned with Emily's decisions and how they may impact Jack. Stevie convinces Jack to leave the Hamptons, but he returns when Emily is framed for Victoria's murder. Stevie attends Jack and Emily's wedding after the latter's revenge is finished.
- Henri Esteve as Javier Salgado (Season 3): Nolan's ex-cellmate who stayed with him while he was under arrest. Javier had a brief relationship with Charlotte and was hired by Daniel and Margaux to develop the MyClone app. He was fired after Nolan sabotaged the app and left the Hamptons soon after.
- Olivier Martinez as Pascal LeMarchal (Season 3): Founder of Voulez and Margaux's father. Pascal is lured to the Hamptons by Conrad, who wants to go into business with him. Pascal is revealed to have murdered Aiden's father and later kills a reporter that threatens to expose him. He is engaged to Victoria before Conrad kills him by pushing him into the spinning blades of his chopper.
- Daniel Zovatto as Gideon LeMarchal (Seasons 3-4): Pascal's son and Margaux's half-brother, who framed Daniel for murder and blackmailed him into leaving Voulez. Gideon was sleeping with Charlotte Clarke, but she caught him cheating on her. Gideon was arrested when Margaux planted drugs on him as he was boarding a plane.
- Nestor Serrano as Edward Alvarez (Season 4): Police chief and Jack's boss, who has a history with Victoria. He is stabbed and killed by Malcolm Black.
- Carolyn Hennesy as Penelope Ellis (Season 4): Louise's mother, who so apparently drugging her so she can control Louise's inheritance. She also claims that Louise murdered her father. In the hallucinations Louise has of Penelope, she is emotionally abusive to Louise.
- Courtney Ford as Katherine Black (Season 4): Daughter of criminal Malcolm Black and his wife, Lynn Wayburn. She joined the FBI under the alias Kate Taylor. Kate came to the Hamptons to solve Conrad's murder and started a relationship with Jack. She planned to recover the money that her David stole from her father. Victoria sent her a message that directed her towards Emily. She told Emily that her mother was being held by Malcolm, and though Emily initially bought it, she soon discovered Kate's true intentions. The two women engaged in a violent battle and Kate eventually for the upper hand. Kate shot and killed Daniel, who protected Emily, and then she was shot and killed by Jack.
- Tommy Flanagan as Malcolm Black (Season 4): An illegal arms dealer, Kate's father, and the one who held David captive for years. He forced David to launder money by threatening David's daughter. Malcolm comes to the Hamptons to find it why he lost contact with Kate. He kidnaps Emily (having discovered she is really Amanda), and Victoria. He finds out Kate is dead and tries to throw Emily into an incinerator, but he is shot by David and falls into the incinerator.
- Sebastian Pigott as Lyman Ellis (Season 4): Louise's older brother and a lawyer who is running for congress. He is his mother's pride and joy, and is helping her to drug Louise. After Louise discovers her brother's deception, she cuts off funding for his campaign. Lyman offers to help Victoria contest Edward Grayson's will, and asks for a large enough cut to fund his campaign. Lyman and Victoria lost, and Victoria fired Lyman. Margaux paid Lyman to get information on Emily. Lyman faked a reconciliation with Louise, so he could have access to Nolan's computer. Louise caught Lyman and they struggled over the memory stick, causing Lyman to lose his balance and fall to his death.
- Ed Quinn as James Allen (Season 4): A loyal employee of the LeMarchal family. He digs up dirt on Emily and Jack for Margaux, and then drugs Jack to make him get a DUI. He often tries to keep Margaux on her path of Revenge because he doesn't want to see someone who is weak running the LeMarchal empire.
- Gina Torres as Natalie Waters (Season 4): A woman who comes to the Hamptons, meeting with Victoria at her club and watching as Victoria blackmails her friends into supporting one of her causes. After her father-in-law, Edward, dies, Victoria expects to inherit his money but instead meets Natalie, who reveals that she was married to Edward when he died. She was his nurse beforehand and is intent on taking Victoria's place as queen of the Hamptons. She and David appear to be getting close but at a party, Natalie suddenly acts as if David is attacking her. Having found a watch given to her by Conrad, David realizes Natalie and Conrad were lovers. She confirms this, saying when Conrad died, she went after his father, starving him until he signed his fortune over to her instead of Victoria. She also plans to ruin David's reputation as payback for Conrad. However, Victoria reveals she has recorded Natalie's confession and forces her to sign the money over and leave the Hamptons or face prison for her treatment of her husband.
- Josh Pence as Tony Hughes (Season 4): A social worker, who develops feelings for Nolan, but he won't date Nolan while he stays married to Louise. Nolan divorces Louise, so he and Tony can be together. Tony leaves Nolan when he finds out that he was successful in being able to adopt a child.
- Courtney Love as White Gold (Season 4): An assassin that Margaux hired to kill Emily, but she later called off the hit. Margaux contacted White Gold when she needed her to help Victoria get away before she was found alive. Gold ended up killing Ben when he found Victoria first. Gold later attacks Jack, putting him in the hospital, and Nolan in order to find out where Emily is. Nolan hits Gold with a stun gun, and then leaves behind a flash drive for the police with proof of Gold's crimes

== Guest cast ==
- Derek Ray as Lee Moran (season 1), a henchman of Victoria's whom she employs to recover Mason Treadwell's tapes from Amanda, for which he assaults Jack Porter. Victoria later employs him to stage an attack on Daniel in prison to convince Judge Hawthorne to reconsider bail, and then to threaten one of the jurors into voting in Daniel's favor. Emily sets him up for Tyler's murder, and he is killed in prison by Gordon Murphy on Conrad's orders.
- James Purefoy as Dominik Wright (season 1), a painter and an old lover of Victoria's before her marriage to Conrad. The pair rekindle their relationship during Daniel's trial, where Victoria tells him what she did to David Clarke. While Wright keeps her secret, Conrad forces him to leave New York. He leaves behind an unfinished portrait depicting Victoria, which is auctioned off at the Memorial Day party in the beginning of season 2. Purefoy has stated that there are no current plans for Wright to return to Revenge.
- Tess Harper as Carole Lyn Miller (season 1), a former secretary at Grayson Global and Nolan's aunt. Miller investigated Grayson Global for proof that David Clarke was set up, but before they could inform him of their findings, he was killed by Gordon Murphy at Conrad's behest. Following this, Nolan faked her death. At the time of season 1, Miller lived in Lancaster, Pennsylvania, under the alias Carole Thomas. Emily learns of Miller through a journal missing from her Infinity Box, and poses as a Homeland Security agent to interrogate her. Miller confronts Emily about her desire to kill Gordon Murphy, saying that her father would condemn the action. Miller was born in 1950 and is a type 2 diabetic. She owns a shotgun, which she nearly uses on Emily.
- Veronica Cartwright as Judge Elizabeth Blackwell/Hawthorne (season 2), the judge of the Tyler Barrol murder case. She initially denies bail to Daniel and forces him to stay at Riker's Island, although she sets bail at ten million dollars following Daniel's attack there. Hawthorne exonerates Daniel when Emily sets Lee Moran up for the murder.
- Jamal Duff as Big Ed (season 1), Nolan's bodyguard who is employed whenever Nolan feels threatened by Frank or Tyler.
- C. C. H. Pounder as Warden Sharon Stiles, Emily's former warden in juvenile detention. Stiles encouraged Emily, then Amanda, to make friends with the real Emily Thorne so she would have an ally rather than an enemy and also gave her the phone number of Satoshi Takeda (their connection is unknown). She is revealed to be working with Emily, who is still known to her as Amanda Clarke, and attempts but fails to thwart Frank Stevens' investigation of Emily's past.
- Christina Chang as Karrie Thurgood, a woman seen attending some of Victoria's social events, such as the Memorial Day party in season 1 and the baby shower thrown for Amanda in season 2 (where she appears well into a pregnancy of her own).
- Shevaun Cavanaugh Kastl as Ann Woodbury (season 1), the third juror of Daniel's murder trial and the single mother of a young son, Matthew. After Benjamin Brooks notes Woodbury's reaction to the proceedings, Woodbury becomes the unfortunate target of Victoria Grayson, who employs Lee Moran to blackmail her into voting not to convict Daniel using her son.
- Alex Carter as Michael Davis (season 1), Lydia's ex-husband who divorced her after her affair with Conrad was exposed.
- Matthew Glave as Bill Harmon (season 1), a former friend of David Clarke to whom Amanda affectionately referred as "Uncle Bill". He discovered David's affair with Victoria and told Conrad about it, and Conrad bribed Harmon to help take David down. Years later, he becomes the wealthy head of Harmon Investments through insider trading and other crimes. Harmon, unaware of Emily's true identity, takes her on as a potential investor. She provides him with a false tip that NolCorp is buying into AllCom Cellular, a Chinese tech company. Harmon pours his investments in AllCom only for Nolan to announce that he is instead investing in AllCom's competitor, Unitech, causing a major stock loss in Harmon's company. Though he attempts to keep the information from leaking to his clients, Emily contacts them all to inform them of the stock loss, effectively ruining Harmon.
- Yancey Arias as Senator Tom Kingsly (season 1), the district attorney who prosecuted David Clarke. Became Senator with the Graysons' support but was forced to step down after Emily threatened to expose his affair, which she did anyway to ruin his life.
- Amy Landecker as Dr. Michelle Banks (seasons 1,3), psychiatrist who mentally tormented Emily as a child. Became an accomplice in the death of Aiden Mathis. Coerced into helping Emily keep Victoria locked in an insane asylum as part of the latter's final revenge.
- David Monahan as Dr. Alexander Barrol (season 1), Tyler Barrol's older brother who was called to the Hamptons to help stop Tyler's rampage.
- Courtney B. Vance as Benjamin Brooks, Daniel's attorney when he was on trial for Tyler's murder.
- Michael Reilly Burke as Agent John McGowen (season 1), a federal agent who worked with Victoria to gather evidence against Conrad. He was killed when Gordon Murphy blew up the plane he was on.
- Geoff Pierson as Judge Robert Barnes, the judge who was paid off by Conrad to convict David. Was publicly shamed after Emily convinced his wife to reveal he had abused her.
- Clare Carey as Patricia Barnes, the abused wife of Judge Robert Barnes.
- Lindsey Haun and Dendrie Taylor as Meredith Hayward, the abusive foster mother of a young Amanda Clarke and Eli James, who chose to punish them by locking them in a small chamber she called "the bin". She kept letters from David Clarke hidden from Amanda and later sold them to Mason Treadwell, and they were destroyed in the fire Emily set at his home. The letters revealed the existence of Victoria's firstborn son, Patrick Harper.
- Gemma Massot as Colleen Mathis (season 2), the deceased younger sister of Aiden Mathis who was separated from him when he was 12 and was forced into prostitution. The Initiative kills Colleen through an induced heroin overdose in 2006, after Aiden killed her kidnapper, Dmitri Vladof. Six years later, Helen Crowley coerces Aiden into dispatching Victoria with old video footage of Colleen, but when he fails to comply with the demand he receives a video depicting his sister's death. Three days later, Aiden finds the warehouse where she died in Jersey City and learns that, being a Jane Doe, she was buried in a potter's field.
- Anjul Nigam as Zahir Lahari (season 2), the father of Padma Lahari. He was kidnapped by the Initiative to force Padma to seek a job at NolCorp, where she was to obtain his Carrion program or her father would be killed. Eventually, Nolan discovers this and he along with Emily and Aiden decide to help Padma. After she questions whether her father remains alive, she receives his severed finger. Before Aiden can rescue the Laharis as she hands over Carrion, Padma is abducted and killed along with Zahir six weeks later, by Trask. Zahir's death is offscreen.
- William Devane as Edward Grayson (season 1), Chairman of the Board of Grayson Global, formerly founder and original CEO of the company, Conrad's father. He is dedicated to protecting the reputation and status of the empire and his family name, going so far as to demand that his granddaughter Charlotte not see a therapist to discuss her paternity. Edward died offscreen in Season 4, and it was revealed that he had married Natalie Waters, the nurse who had cared for him and left his entire estate to. It was later revealed that Natalie forced Edward into signing over everything to her by starving him.
- Adrienne Barbeau as Marion Harper (season 2,4), Victoria's mother, who apparently taught Victoria how to chase men and whom Victoria begrudges due to getting kicked out of her own home when she was 15. Marion had caught her husband, Maxwell, sneaking into Victoria's room and rather than helping her daughter after a molestation, treats her as a whore and ostracizes her for decades, and has her murder another lover of hers. Victoria pays a man named Benjamin Greevy to seduce Marion and at a Thanksgiving dinner in 2006, tells him about Marion's true self, which disgusts him. Though the penniless Marion begs Victoria to help her or at least give her a room, Victoria spitefully throws her mother out. In the series finale, it is revealed that Marion died, and Victoria used her mother's body to fake her own death. Amanda Brooks portrays the younger Marion Harper.
- Brian Goodman as Carl Porter, Jack and Declan's father who dies during first season. He subsequently appears in prequel episodes where it is revealed that he helped in covering up the murder of a man who was threatening him which ends up having future impact on Jack.
- Rachel Katherine DiPillo as Jamie Cardaci (season 1), a friend and classmate of Declan's who hails from Yonkers and was once a homecoming queen. They work on an economics project together for Collins Prep, but abandon it to look for Sammy. Charlotte, in an attempt to reconcile with Declan, finds Jamie in the Stowaway and immediately assumes he has moved on. Digging on the part of Charlotte reveals that Jamie had an affair with her married history teacher, and photos of the two of them together are posted on a website for all of Collins Prep to see. The incident angers Declan to the point where he refuses to speak to Charlotte, and thus causes her overdose.
- Jonathan Adams as Matt Duncan (season 2), an old friend of Carl Porter's, who shot and killed Joe Ryan after he harmed his daughter. Matt showed up at Carl's grandsons baptism, and was dismayed to see Kenny and Nate Ryan there. He cryptically warned Jack about the Ryan brothers. Kenny and Nate later ganged up on Matt and beat him up badly. When Jack learned what he had done, he successfully convinced Matt to confess.
- Susan Park as Edith "the Fa1c0n" Lee (season 2), a notorious hacker who helped the Graysons frame David Clarke. She also worked for the Initiative. Sent to prison after Nolan and Emily exposed who she was. Later tricked Nolan into activating the Carrion program.
- Falk Hentschel as Gregor Hoffman (season 2), an employee of the Initiative, who bombed Grayson Global and inadvertently killed Declan Porter. Went on the run after the Initiative fell apart.
- Jessica Tuck as Alison Stoddard (season 2), the wife Governor Mark Stoddard who gave Conrad information on her husband's campaign because she feared another term in office would kill him.
- Myra Turner as Sister Rebecca Gallgher (season 2), the nun at the church where Victoria dropped her son Patrick off as a baby. Emily later approaches her claiming to be pregnant in the hopes of getting information from her.
- Sherri Saum as Donna Carlisle (season 2)
- Dylan Walsh as Jason Prosser (season 2), an old business rival of Conrad's and later Daniel.
- Joaquim de Almeida as Salvador Grobet (season 2), a Grayson Global investor who was blackmailed by Daniel to vote for him as the new CEO of Grayson Global.
- Michael Rose as Joe Ryan (season 2), a racketeer who Carl Porter owned money too. He was shot and killed by Matt Duncan, but Joe's sons Kenny and Nate Ryan believed Carl had murdered their father.
- Maggie Mae Reid as Grace (season 2), Daniel's secretary.
- James LeGros as Father Paul Whitley (season 3), a former employee at Grayson Global, who participated in framing David Clarke. Became a priest and spent his life trying to make up for his sins. Used by Emily to try to get Conrad to confess, but was killed in a car accident.
- Conor Leslie as Bianca (season 3), a maid who works for the Graysons.
- Kathleen York as Sheila Laurie (season 3), an old friend of Victoria's who owned an art gallery.
- Brianna Brown as Lacy (season 3), Patrick Osbourne's ex-wife.
- Gloria Votsis as Morgan Holt (Season 3), a real estate agent that Conrad hired to sell Grayson Manor.
- Ana Ortiz as Bizzy Preston (season 3), a PR specialist who Conrad hired to clean up his image. Years ago, she leaked a story of Nolan being gay, causing his father to sever all tries with him. Nolan got even with her by exposing all of her clients secrets, effectively ruining her career.
- Anil Kumar as Rohan Kamath (season 3), a former student of Takeda's, who completed his revenge mission. Victoria hoped to use the knowledge that he is also Emily's ex-husband against Emily, but had the tables turned on her when they revealed they had married so he could obtain a green card.
- Jayne Brook as Loretta Deaton (season 3), Sara Munello's mother, who did not approve of Sara being the other woman in Daniel's marriage.
- Brett Cullen as Jimmy Brennan (season 3), biological father of Patrick Osbourne, who raped Victoria. Accidentally killed during a scuffle with his son.
- Claire Jacobs as Harriet Mathis (season 3), Aiden and Colleen's mother.
- Tim DeKay as Luke Gilliam (season 3), A former Grayson Global employee who was originally going to take the fall for the downing of Flight 197. He convinced Conrad to frame David and later started his own gas company. He claimed it was Eco friendly, but he was actually poisoning the water supply. Emily tricks him into downing a vial of poisoned water, resulting in him being hospitalized and his ruse exposed.
- John Prosky as Oscar Chapman (season 3), a reporter who knew Aiden's father and told Aiden that he had been murdered by Pascal LeMarchal. He agreed to help Aiden expose Pascal, but Pascal killed him before he could.
- Linc Hand as Kurt Renner (seasons 3-4), a ruthless henchmen of Victoria's.
- Wade Williams as Officer Mostrowski (season 3), a prison guard that assaulted Conrad and later helped him escape in exchange for money. He later dies under suspicious circumstances, reopening the investigation into Conrad's murder. He has a daughter named Denise.
- Yeardley Smith as Phyllis (season 4), a woman who befriends Victoria when Emily has her committed. She helps Victoria escape.
- Alicia Lagano as Nancy (season 4), a recently widowed woman, whose car Emily hit. Emily invited her to her party where she helped expose James Foley as being responsible for her husband's death. Emily hoped this would bring Nancy closure, but it only caused her more pain.
- Ned Vaughn as James Foley (season 4), a man who accidentally killed Nancy's husband, and asked his wife to help him cover up. He also has a mistress named Valerie. Emily humiliated James when she arranged for the new boat he had dedicated to his wife to have Valerie's name out on it instead. In turn, James' humiliated wife outed him to Nancy as the one responsible or for her husband's death.
- Allison McTee as Jennifer Foley (season 4), the pregnant wife of James Foley, who exposes him as the one who accidentally killed Nancy's husband
- Lex Shontz as Vince Walsh (season 4), a man who captures Charlotte to use as bait to lure David into a trap. He is accidentally killed by Charlotte when she tries to escape.
- Charles Shaughnessy as Charles Dawson (season 4), A man who sold his club to Nolan
- Hannah Leder as Crystal (season 4), Amanda's best friend at the strip club, who was paid by Victoria to lie to David.
- Sarah Lancaster as April (season 4), Ben's ex-wife, who resented him for putting her life in danger. She forgave Ben after he and Emily saved her from Wes Perkins, the man that was after her.
- Lucinda Jenney as Judge Leanne Knowls (season 4), the judge that presided over Jack's case when he was drugged and arrested for a DUI. Emily later drugged Leanne as a way of showing her how easy it was for someone to drug Jack.
- Christopher Wheil as Kevin Hunter (season 4), Ben's younger brother, who comes to the Hamptons to celebrate his brother's promotion to detective.
- Tom Amandes as Lawrence Stramberg (season 4), Emily's lawyer when she is accused of murdering Victoria.
