= Charlotte Grayson =

Charlotte Clarke
- Revenge character
- First appearance: "Pilot" (episode 1.01)
- Last appearance: "Two Graves" (episode 4.22)
- Created by: Mike Kelley
- Portrayed by: Christa B. Allen

In-universe information
- Alias: Charlotte Grayson (birth name); Victoria Grayson
- Gender: Female
- Occupation: High school student Care Assistant
- Family: David Clarke (biological father; deceased); Conrad Grayson (legal father; deceased); Victoria Grayson (mother; deceased); Patrick Osbourne (maternal half-brother); Daniel Grayson (maternal half-brother; deceased); Amanda Clarke (paternal half-sister); Marion Harper (maternal grandmother; deceased); Charlotte Clarke (paternal great-aunt)
- Children: Unborn child (child, with Declan; miscarriage)
- Residence: Southampton, New York

Charlotte Grayson, later known as Charlotte Clarke, is a fictional character on the television drama Revenge (2011–2015), portrayed by Christa B. Allen. She is Victoria Grayson's youngest child, but has little in common with her mother; unlike the cold, ruthless Victoria, Charlotte is naïve, loving, open, and forgiving. Like Emily Thorne, Charlotte is intelligent, defying expectations in school with her perfect academic record. She was also a substance abuser and, as the seasons progress, she becomes increasingly emotionally unstable.

== Description ==
Charlotte is the youngest daughter in both the Grayson and Clarke families. The legal daughter of Conrad and Victoria Grayson, Charlotte is actually the result of her mother's affair with David Clarke. She has two older half-brothers, Daniel Grayson, and Patrick Osbourne, and an older half-sister, Amanda Clarke. A straight-A student, she defies expectations with her perfect academic record at school. Unlike the rest of her family, Charlotte has a moral compass and has never done anything to intentionally harm someone for her own benefit. Subsequently, Charlotte has a troubled relationship with her cold, ruthless mother, and is torn between keeping her family together and trying to break away from them.

== Character arc ==
=== Season one ===
In the episode "Duplicity", it is revealed that Victoria often questions whether she should have had Charlotte. Hurt, Charlotte breaks off communication with her mother for a time and begins acting out.

Later during season one, Emily and Charlotte share a closer relationship, as Charlotte sometimes goes to Emily when she is having family troubles. In an interview with journalist Mason Treadwell, David Clarke reveals that Victoria had given birth to a Charlotte while romantically involved with him, making Charlotte Emily's younger half-sister. When Emily tells Charlotte that Daniel proposed, Emily asks if it is alright with her. Charlotte responds positively, stating she always wanted a sister in her life.

After Emily finds out that Charlotte is her sister, she goes to great lengths to prevent her from getting hurt. Emily changes her plan to expose Charlotte's paternity after seeing Charlotte and Conrad getting on the right track again. When Charlotte's paternity is revealed, Emily is deeply saddened that Charlotte has found out in the worst way possible. ("Perception")

Charlotte has a hard time dealing with the lies and betrayal in her family, and begins drinking and stealing narcotic pain-killers. Her boyfriend, Declan Porter, advises her to see a therapist. Her grandfather refuses to allow this, however, saying that if she were to tell someone their family's secrets, the family name would be ruined. Charlotte prefers the truth over her family's reputation, but her grandfather threatens to destroy Declan's chance at attending Prep school and so Charlotte reluctantly complies, taking prescription pills instead of getting help from a therapist. Emily notices Charlotte taking pills at her engagement party and looks hurt and confused that Charlotte would resort to such measures. However, Emily isn't able to speak to her before Victoria shows up, and Charlotte, not wanting to deal with Victoria, walks away ("Chaos").

Charlotte goes to Emily's house and they talk about Charlotte's real father. Emily consoles Charlotte by telling her about the swing their father built, trying to convince Charlotte that David Clarke may not have been all bad. In order to conceal her true identity, Emily says Amanda told her the story. They end their conversation with Emily holding Charlotte on the swing their father built ("Scandal").

Emily tells Nolan she is worried about Charlotte. When she goes to Charlotte's room, Charlotte has many magazines, newspapers, pictures, and records of David Clarke spread out on her bed. Emily asks what all of it is, to which Charlotte replies, "This is my version of father-daughter time". Charlotte unwittingly gives Emily photo evidence of the man responsible for her father's murder (the white-haired man) - as well as the realisation that there is another journal.

In "Reckoning", after a cold goodbye from her mother, Charlotte discovers that Victoria has been a victim in a plane crash. She panics and calls Declan for help. Without listening to her, he tells her to leave him alone and never call him back. When she feels like there is nobody else to turn to, she overdoses on pills. When Conrad enters her room, he finds her unconscious on her bed with the pills strewn around the floor. He shakes her body, waiting for a response, but she remains motionless.

=== Season two ===
In "Destiny", Charlotte has been in rehab some time after her suicide attempt. She stays there the whole winter and misses her mother's funeral, but convinces Conrad to let her go to Victoria's memorial service. Emily goes to visit Charlotte. Charlotte tells her counselor that Emily has been sending her postcards from around the world, and she begs Emily to come to the memorial, unless it would be too awkward because of the relationship between Daniel and Ashley. Before Charlotte leaves, she asks Emily to visit her again, and Emily agrees. Charlotte arrives at the memorial, but after giving a loving speech about her mother, is told by her doctor that her blood has tested positive for a prescription drug. As she is forcibly removed from the party, she breaks free and whispers to Emily that Victoria is alive and she knows where she is. Charlotte has been told that the government is protecting Victoria until they can rebuild the case against Conrad. Victoria has been secretly talking with her for months, with Charlotte the only one who knows Victoria is alive. When Charlotte's room is searched, her doctor discovers her phone, and takes it from her. Charlotte is seen crying and banging on her door trying to get out.

In "Resurrection", Emily claims that since Victoria took her mother away from her, she is going to take Charlotte away from Victoria. She learns Victoria is going to try and take Charlotte out of the country, using Charlotte's money, but Emily says Victoria isn't going to take away her sister too. Emily gives Daniel information on Charlotte's doctor, and he discovers his father has been paying him to keep Charlotte there and to tamper with her drug tests. Conrad's plan is to have Charlotte declared unfit so he can control her inheritance. Daniel has Charlotte freed but she refuses to leave with him as she doesn't trust him. She instead goes with Emily and plans to stay with her. Charlotte learns from Emily about Amanda's pregnancy and becomes excited that she is going to be an aunt. Emily takes Charlotte to see Victoria and she tells her mother that she is going to become an aunt. Victoria is less than ecstatic. Victoria is more upset that Charlotte has lost her inheritance. Charlotte realizes that Victoria is as cruel as she remembers and leaves angry and hurt, which Nolan and Emily watch from a hidden camera from the car. Emily is happy her plan worked, as Charlotte decides to stay in the country, although is sad about what she has put Charlotte through. Later, Charlotte sees Victoria in Grayson Manor. Victoria has led everyone to believe she was held for ransom. Victoria tells her it was the only way for them to be together. Charlotte begs Emily to keep their secret, and after Emily sees that Charlotte needs her mother she decides that she won't use Charlotte to get to Victoria.

Charlotte tries to distance herself from her family. After learning of their fraudulent and treacherous activities, Charlotte denounces them and refuses to have anything to do with them. She refuses to put on a fake smile to save her family's reputation. She instead spends her time with Amanda Clarke, who she believes is her sister, and the Porter family (including her supposed nephew Carl). In the episode "Collision", on her 18th birthday, Charlotte legally changes her last name to Clarke in honor of her father.

After the death of Amanda Clarke, Charlotte starts to get involved in violent activities. A school friend of hers, Regina, speaks badly of Amanda, and Charlotte punches her at the Grayson Halloween Masquerade. After a while, Regina gets closer with her after seeing what Charlotte is going through and encourages her to have fun. They sneak into clubs illegally, and Charlotte and Regina put on a show by kissing each other and allowing photographs to be taken which are revealed in the tabloids. In "Engagement", she goes to jail after being caught sneaking into the club. Daniel bails her out and asks why she is so distant from her family. She replies, "I just don't want to see anyone else come into this family and get hurt," revealing she is pregnant.

In "Truth, Part II", Declan dies, leaving Charlotte alone with their unborn child.

=== Season three ===
In "Fear" it is revealed that Charlotte has miscarried and has been spending her time at a Grayson home in France after learning of Declan's death. She returns to Grayson Manor and spends a lot of her time with Jack and Carl. Her relationship with Emily becomes estranged. She begins a relationship with Nolan's friend Javier. In the episode Revolution, Charlotte is abducted, which is later revealed to be part of Emily's plan to have Charlotte discover the truth about her parents, confront them, and get them to confess. At the end of season three, Charlotte realises Jack was involved in her abduction and has him arrested.

=== Season four ===
Six months after Conrad's death, Charlotte and Daniel have been left penniless and adrift after the government seized all of their family's assets and Victoria apparently deserted them (in reality she was secretly committed to a psychiatric hospital by Emily). Charlotte remains close to Daniel, but remains estranged from both Jack and Emily - she has started doing cocaine and is dating Gideon LeMarchal (Daniel Zovatto), until Charlotte learns that Gideon has been using her to get her money and was cheating on her behind her back. Now totally despondent, she is apparently ready to jump off a hotel roof, but is saved by Ben Hunter.

Feeling responsible for all the woes in Charlotte's life, Emily has Jack bring Charlotte to her, and reveals herself as the real Amanda Clarke, as well as the fact she kidnapped her and she used her half-sister in her cause to destroy the conspiracy. Charlotte is shown the Infinity Box containing proof of Emily's identity, but rejects Emily's advances, smashes the box and leaves in anger. Later, Charlotte calls Emily to the Stowaway seemingly to discuss things further, only for an unstable Charlotte to knock Emily unconscious and sets the Stowaway on fire with Emily inside to kill her. Emily is saved by Jack, however, she covers up the truth, leaving the authorities to rule it an accident.

Victoria returns to the Hamptons and is appalled to learn of Charlotte's suicide attempt from Daniel. Unlike her brother, Charlotte accepts her mother back and shares her knowledge of Emily's identity as Amanda and confesses her own failed attempt to kill her, and she is now fearing retribution. Victoria decides to bring Charlotte with her to come live with her and David Clarke - revealing her real father is very much alive, and the two will protect their daughter from Emily. The two come to the house in the woods, and Charlotte meets David for the first time. Charlotte immediately loves her father upon meeting him, David is overjoyed and Victoria is delighted at their meeting.

In discussions with him, Charlotte becomes uncomfortable with the fact Victoria is framing Charlotte to the emotionally fragile David as always having loved and believed in him, and was behind David's exoneration by having purposefully enticed Conrad into confessing for the entire world to hear. Charlotte is told David will find out about his other daughter Amanda's survival, but only when Victoria has set the narrative that "she viciously dedicated herself to our destruction and our suffering". Emily later tracks Charlotte's phone to their hideout, but is driven away by a shotgun-wielding Victoria, with Charlotte watching.

Charlotte continues to try and emotionally torment Emily much to Jack's dismay, but ends up being used as bait to lure David into a trap. Charlotte kills the guy during the struggle and calls Emily for help. Charlotte is shocked when Emily tells her that Victoria killed Aiden. Charlotte decides she needs to go to rehab, and tells Daniel that Emily is Amanda before she leaves.

Louise Ellis later visits Charlotte at rehab when she believes Victoria to have died. Charlotte tells her that she wants nothing to do with her mother's funeral, but that Louise is welcome to plan it. Louise begs her to attend, and Charlotte responds that she is healthier and happier than she has ever been. Charlotte promises to let Louise into Victoria's penthouse hotel room if the latter stops calling her.

In the series finale, Charlotte is seen with Emily at David's grave after he passes away. The two leave flowers. Charlotte is last seen at Jack and Emily's wedding. She is Emily's maid of honor, finally having accepted her sister and forgiven Emily for all of the lies. She is shown to be grateful for Jack's mention of Declan in his speech, and continues to enjoy the reception. In a nightmare that Emily has, Charlotte has Victoria's heart be a replacement transplant for Emily's, after being shot. She appears to take pleasure in it, making sure that Emily never discovers what she did. Whether or not the nightmare was real remains unknown.

== Personality ==
Charlotte is the most honourable and trustworthy member of her family, being the only Grayson who considers the truth more important than her family's reputation. She is originally coquettish and rebellious, something her mother disapproves of. Charlotte is also highly intelligent and has a perfect academic record, despite the expectations of others. Charlotte is devastated when she learns that Victoria wondered if giving birth to her was a mistake. Unlike Daniel, who is closer to Victoria than to Conrad, Charlotte has a closer and more loving relationship with her father than with her mother, which is why Charlotte is devastated along with Conrad when she learns that Conrad isn't her real father. Charlotte is also the only member of her family whom Emily does not want to harm and although she doesn't know that Emily is actually Amanda Clarke, her half-sister, she turns to her for support after learning the truth about her parentage.

Although Charlotte is originally sweet, friendly and charitable, the constant disapproval of her mother, learning that she is David Clarke's daughter, breaking up with Declan, the emotional abuse and lies of her family, and the presumed death of Victoria cause her personality to change to miserable and depressed. Her relationship with her parents is strained by the events of their lives. As Charlotte becomes more aware of her surroundings and her family's deceitful ways, she no longer trusts her own family and tries to get away from their lies that are suffocating her. She doesn't care that her family's reputation could be on the line. She becomes increasingly, but unknowingly, involved with Emily's revenge scheme. Even as she tries to break ties with her family, she gets thrown back into their lies once again, and she is usually right in the center of them. Victoria constantly belittles Amanda, Declan and Emily, saying that they are low-level citizens with nothing to offer. However, Charlotte believes they offer a realness and a love that she doesn't get from her own family.

== Relationships ==
- Emily Thorne: Charlotte is Emily's younger half-sister. Emily discovers Charlotte is her sister when watching an interview of her father conducted by Mason Treadwell. Charlotte is initially the only Grayson who doesn't know what really happened to David Clarke. After Emily finds out Charlotte is her sister, she tries to avoid all possible plans that would hurt Charlotte. Being one of the few people Emily truly loves, Emily wishes to protect Charlotte and be there for her, without revealing her true identity and her revenge scheme. When Emily tells Charlotte the truth, Charlotte tries to kill her by setting the Stowaway on fire.
- Victoria Grayson: Victoria loves her children very much, although she has a better relationship with Daniel than with Charlotte. When it is revealed that Charlotte is actually David Clarke's daughter, it is also revealed that the reason Victoria has been so cold towards Charlotte is because she reminds her of the fact that she betrayed David. As time goes on, Victoria's whole family turns against her, but after surviving the white-haired man's attempt to assassinate her, she becomes closer to Charlotte. However, she constantly belittles Charlotte, disapproving of everything she does. She doesn't like Charlotte hanging around Emily and Amanda, who Charlotte is often closer to than her own mother. However, she does love Charlotte, even if it appears she sees her as a disgrace. Victoria often mentions how much Charlotte reminds her of David, not only by her physical appearance, but also by her mannerisms and wit.
- Daniel Grayson: Charlotte and Daniel have always had a close relationship. They have always had each other's backs no matter what war Conrad and Victoria wage on one another. When Charlotte is pregnant, Daniel is the first and only person she tells. After Emily loses Charlotte's trust, Charlotte tries to sabotage their relationship, believing that Daniel deserves better than Emily.
- Conrad Grayson: Charlotte grew up believing Conrad was her father. She is close to Conrad and is devastated when she finds out that he isn't her biological father. Despite this, the two remain close until Jack tells Charlotte that Conrad was responsible for Declan's death. Charlotte turns her back on Conrad, but later reconciles with him after she lies and tells Conrad that she had tried to kill him (it was actually Patrick). Conrad is quick to forgive Charlotte and the two repair their relationship. Their relationship is permanently ruined, however, when Charlotte learns of his involvement in terrorism. She confronts him and threatens to expose him to the police. Conrad brags about his crimes and threatens Charlotte's life if she tells anyone. Conrad is arrested when his confession is broadcast to the world, and he is killed before he has a chance to reconcile with Charlotte.
