= Conrad Grayson =

- Revenge character
- First appearance: "Pilot" (episode 1.01)
- Last appearance: "Atonement" (episode 4.10)
- Created by: Mike Kelley
- Portrayed by: Henry Czerny

In-universe information
- Gender: Male
- Occupation: Governor of New York (formerly); CEO of Grayson Global (formerly)
- Family: Edward Grayson (father; deceased)
- Spouse: Stevie Grayson (ex-wife); Victoria Grayson (ex-wife; deceased)
- Children: Daniel Grayson (son; deceased); Charlotte Grayson (adopted daughter); Patrick Osborne (stepson)
- Residence: Grayson Manor; Southampton, New York

Conrad Grayson is a fictional character and a major antagonist on the ABC television show Revenge (2011–2015). He is portrayed by actor Henry Czerny.

== Overview ==
Czerny was cast in the role in March 2011.

Conrad Grayson is the CEO of Grayson Global and head of the Grayson family. He is Victoria's husband and father of Daniel and Charlotte (although not Charlotte's biological father). A shrewd and successful tycoon, Conrad is well-feared among his peers in both business and Hamptons’ society but operates with questionable moral integrity. He is ruthless and willing to do whatever it takes to emerge unscathed from difficult situations.

25 years before season one's events, Conrad was already married to Stevie Pruitt. Victoria stated in Episode 7 (season 1) that when she met Conrad 25 years ago, she too was lonely and insecure, (just like Lydia). Conrad also once "gave up everything to show how much he loved Victoria".

Eight years before the show's main timeline, Conrad was involved in laundering money for the Americon Initiative, a terrorist group which used the money in a terrorist attack that brought down a plane, Flight 1-9-7. After the disaster, Conrad worked with Frank and a reluctant Victoria to frame David Clarke, her lover and his employee. The FBI stormed David's house and arrested him for treason, while his daughter Amanda was taken into foster care for at least eight years, never seeing her father again. Sixteen years later, she returns to her hometown, calling herself Emily Thorne, intent on avenging her father and destroying the Graysons.

Conrad's affair with Victoria's best friend, Lydia, further damages the couple's strained relationship and leads to divorce proceedings. Initially close to his daughter, Conrad is devastated when a DNA test reveals she is not his biological child and belongs to the hated David Clarke. He exposes Victoria at a family dinner and blackmails her lover, Dominik, into leaving her. In the first season finale, Conrad warns Victoria not to get on a plane but she appears to disregard him. After the plane is destroyed, he believes Victoria has died but she eventually calls him to ask for help with Murphy. Conrad helps Victoria with a scheme to make it appear she was kidnapped and held hostage by Murphy. He eventually asks Victoria to remarry him, explaining that it will prevent them from having to testify against each other. At their second wedding, Conrad is arrested, wrongly, for the murder of Gordon Murphy. Helen, a member of the Initiative, arranges his release on bail.

After Daniel replaces Conrad as the CEO of Grayson Global, Conrad decides to run for governor and spends the rest of Season 2 doing whatever he has to achieve his goal. He makes a deal with Nate Ryan, which puts Jack Porter's business, the Stowaway at risk. Amanda steals Emily's laptop and uses it to blackmail Conrad. Nate goes after Jack and Amanda in retaliation, and both Nate and Amanda end up dead and Jack in the hospital, severely injured.

Jack blames Conrad for Amanda's death and tries to expose him. In the Season 2 finale, Conrad has a bomb planted at Grayson Global, intended for Jack, but Declan is instead caught in the blast and dies from a ruptured artery. During an argument, Conrad accidentally reveals to Daniel he knew about the bomb. Conrad later tells Victoria he has joined the Initiative and is elected Governor of New York at the end of Season 2.

At the beginning of Season 3, Conrad is diagnosed with Huntington's disease and is forced to step down as governor. It is revealed that Emily poisoned Conrad and changed the results on the computer to say he had Huntington's disease. After Charlotte learns Conrad is responsible for Declan's death, she turns her back on him. This causes Conrad to seek redemption and Emily tries to use Conrad's associate, Father Paul Whitley, to get Conrad to confess. Victoria's son Patrick Osborne tampers with the brakes on Conrad's car, and Paul is killed in the crash. Soon after, Conrad learns he doesn't have Huntington's disease and reclaims his place as head of the Grayson family.

Determined to get back into the business world, Conrad attempts to form a partnership with his old business rival Pascal LeMarchal, but that soon falls apart. Daniel tells Conrad that Pascal has been talking to federal agents. When Pascal tries to get Conrad to confess his crimes, Conrad kills Pascal by pushing him into the blades of his helicopter. Pascal's death is ruled as an accident and Conrad is exonerated. In the penultimate episode of Season 3, Conrad is arrested when his confession to framing David Clarke is broadcast to the entire world. In the season 3 finale, Conrad escapes from prison and is stabbed to death by a very much alive David Clarke. Conrad appears in flashbacks with Daniel in the 10th episode of Season 4.
