= Gabriel Mann =

American actor and model (born 1972)

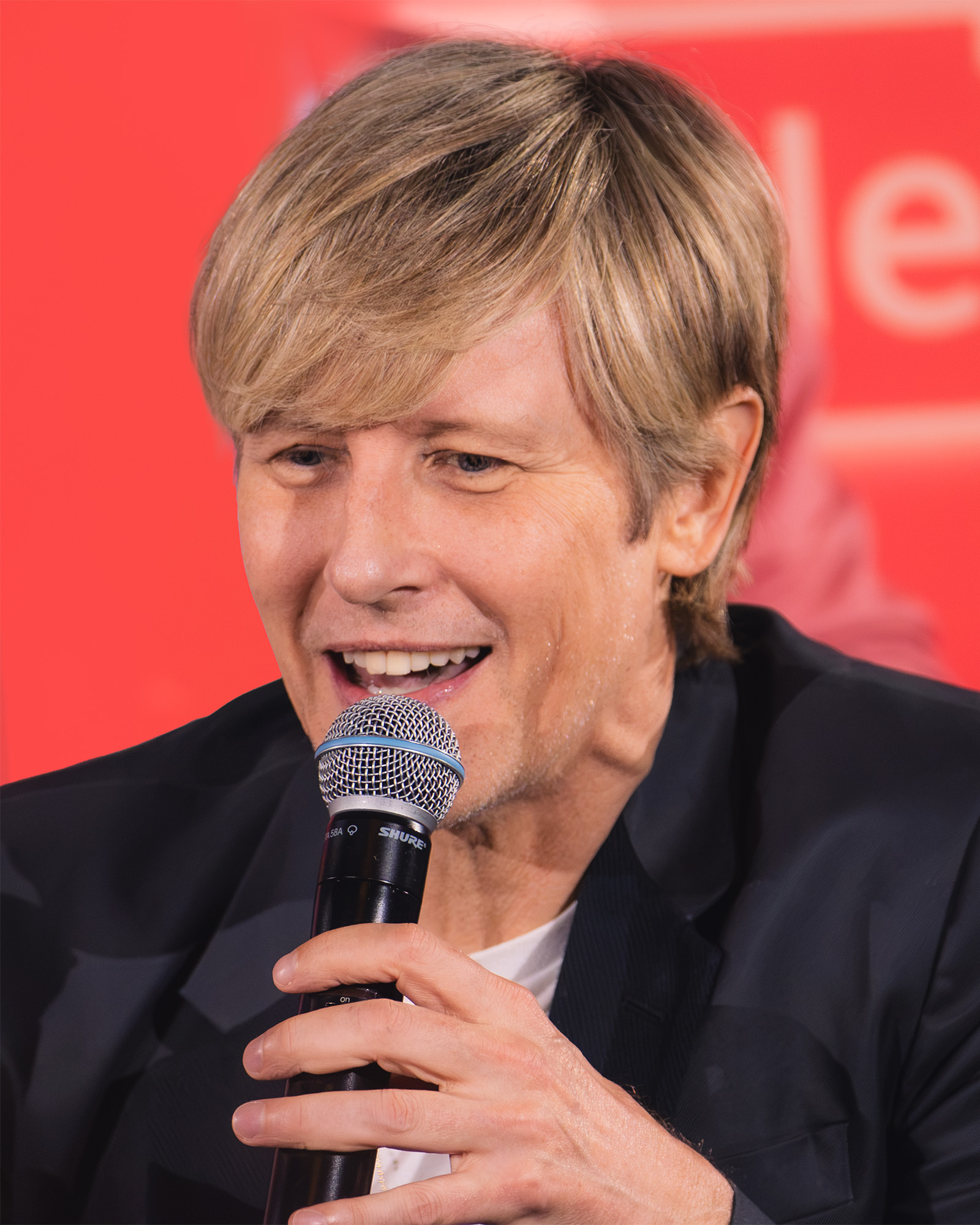
- Mann in 2026
- Born: Gabriel Wilhoit Amis Mick; May 14, 1972 (age 54); Middlebury, Vermont, U.S.
- Occupations: Actor, model
- Years active: 1995–present

Gabriel Mann (born Gabriel Wilhoit Amis Mick; May 14, 1972) is an American actor and model, known for his role as Nolan Ross on the ABC drama series Revenge. He has co-starred in several films, including The Life of David Gale, The Bourne Identity, and The Bourne Supremacy. Mann studied acting at The Neighborhood Playhouse School of the Theatre in New York City.

== Life and career ==
Mann was born as Gabriel Wilhoit Amis Mick on May 14, 1972, in Middlebury, Vermont, to Alice Jo (née Amis), an attorney, and Stephen Smith Mick, a sociology professor. Mann began his career as a professional runway model.

He started acting in 1995 in the films Parallel Sons and Stonewall, in which he was credited as Gabriel Mick. He appeared as Father Francis in Dominion: Prequel to the Exorcist, directed by Paul Schrader. Mann played one of the lead roles in the psychological thriller Psych 9 with Sara Foster, Cary Elwes, and Michael Biehn.

Mann appeared in episodes of the television series ER, Fantasy Island, Jeremiah, Carnivàle, Wasteland, Time of Your Life, and Legend of the Seeker. In 2008 he appeared in four episodes of the AMC drama series Mad Men as Arthur Case. He also voiced Bruce Banner in the animated series The Avengers: Earth's Mightiest Heroes and Wolverine and the X-Men.

In May 2012, Mann joined the ensemble cast of Diego Luna's biopic film Cesar Chavez, alongside Michael Peña, America Ferrera, Rosario Dawson, John Malkovich, and Wes Bentley. Mann starred as billionaire computer hacker Nolan Ross on the ABC drama series Revenge, which ran from 2011 to 2015. He is also signed with DNA Models and previously with Next Models. He has worked with Mario Testino for Gap and as the face of CP Company as well as Richard Avedon for Club Monaco. He has also worked with Mario Sorrenti for Perry Ellis, Ellen Von Unwerth, Steven Klein, Tyler Shields, Marc Jacobs, and Calvin Klein.

In 2019, Mann starred as Gage Scott in the Netflix thriller anthology miniseries What/If.

== Filmography ==
=== Film ===
Year	Title	Role	Notes
1995	Parallel Sons	Seth Carlson	
1995	Stonewall	Rioter	
1996	I Shot Andy Warhol	Clean-cut boy	
1998	How to Make the Cruelest Month	Leonard Crane	
1998	High Art	James	
1998	Great Expectations	Owen	
1998	Claudine's Return	Kenneth	
1999	No Vacancy	Michael	
1999	Outside Providence	Jack Wheeler	
1999	Dying to Live	Matthew	
2000	American Virgin	Brian	
2000	Cherry Falls	Kenny Ascott	
2001	Things Behind the Sun	Owen	
2001	Josie and the Pussycats	Alan M.	
2001	Summer Catch	Auggie Mulligan	
2001	New Port South	Wilson	
2001	Buffalo Soldiers	Pfc. Brian Knoll	
2002	The Bourne Identity	Danny Zorn	
2002	Abandon	Harrison Hobart	
2003	The Life of David Gale	Zack Stemmons	
2004	Sleep Easy, Hutch Rimes	Jesse Proudfit	
2004	The Bourne Supremacy	Danny Zorn	
2004	Drum	Jürgen Schadeberg	
2005	Dominion: Prequel to the Exorcist	Father Francis	
2005	A Lot Like Love	Peter	
2005	Don't Come Knocking	Earl	
2005	The Big Empty	The Thoughtful Man	Short film
2005	Piggy Banks	Michael	
2006	Valley of the Heart's Delight	Jack Pacheco	
2007	Love and Mary	Jake/Brent	
2008	Demption	Paul	Short film
2008	The Ramen Girl	Ethan	
2008	80 Minutes	Alex North	
2008	Dark Streets	Chaz	
2008	The Rainbow Tribe	Mr. Murray	
2008	The Coverup	Stu Pepper	
2010	Psych 9	Cole Hanniger	
2011	Fake	Daniel Jakor	
2013	Zerosome	Michael "Lippy" Lippman	
2014	Cesar Chavez	Bogdanovich Junior	

=== Television ===
Year	Title	Role	Notes
1996	Harvest of Fire	John Beiler	Television film
1997	Heart Full of Rain	Jacob Dockett	Television film
1997	ER	Carl Twomey	Episode: "Random Acts"
1999	Fantasy Island	Cybil Hammond	Episode: "Innocent"
1999	Dying to Live	Matthew "Matt" Jannett	Television film
1999	Wasteland	Justin	Episode: "Double Date"
2000	Time of Your Life	Ethan	Episode: "The Time They Decided to Date"
2002	Jeremiah	Andrew Kincaid	Episode: "A Means to an End"
2003	Carnivàle	Harlan Staub	Episode: "Black Blizzard"
2008	Mad Men	Arthur Case	4 episodes
2008	Wolverine and the X-Men	Bruce Banner (voice)	Episode: "Wolverine vs. the Hulk"
2009–2010	Legend of the Seeker	Young Zeddicus Zu'l Zorander	2 episodes
2010–2012	The Avengers: Earth's Mightiest Heroes	Bruce Banner (voice)	7 episodes
2011–2015	Revenge	Nolan Ross	Main role Nominated—Teen Choice Award for Choice TV Male Scene Stealer
2015	The Mysteries of Laura	Shane Allen	Episode: "The Mystery of the Locked Box"
2016	Ray Donovan	Jacob Waller	6 episodes
2016	Rush Hour	Reginald Mason	Episode: "Knock, Knock... House Creeping!"
2017–2018	Damnation	Martin Hyde	5 episodes
2018	Hawaii Five O	Lee	Episode: "Aia I Hi'Ikua; I Hi'Ialo"
2019	The Blacklist	Ilya Koslov	3 episodes
2019	What/If	Gage Scott	Recurring role
2019–2022	Batwoman	Tommy Elliot / Hush	Recurring role
2026	NCIS: Origins	Doug Westmont	4 episodes
