= Pilot (Better Off Ted) =

- Better Off Ted episode
- Ted talking to Lem and Phil
- Episode no.: Season 1 Episode 1
- Directed by: Michael Fresco
- Written by: Victor Fresco
- Original air date: March 18, 2009

Guest appearances
- Maz Jobrani as Dr. Bhamba; Carla Jimenez as Patricia; Colin Baiocchi as Brian at age 3; Jim Lau as Screaming Office Worker

Episode chronology
← Previous —	Next → "Heroes"

"Pilot" is the series premiere of the American sitcom Better Off Ted aired on ABC. It premiered on March 18, 2009, with mostly positive reviews, and over five and a half million viewers. In the premiere, Ted struggles with the ethics of freezing one of his scientists on his company's orders. Meanwhile, Linda is stealing creamer from the office in order to satisfy her need to rebel against the company.

Iranian comedian Maz Jobrani plays Dr. Bhamba, originally a one-time character. Bhamba became a recurring character, next appearing in "Goodbye Mr. Chips".

== Cast ==
- Jay Harrington as Theodore Margaret "Ted" Crisp
- Portia de Rossi as Veronica Palmer
- Andrea Anders as Linda Katherine Zwordling
- Jonathan Slavin as Dr. Philip "Phil" Myman
- Malcolm Barrett as Dr. Lem Hewitt
- Isabella Acres as Rose Crisp

== Synopsis ==
Ted Crisp works for the powerful company, Veridian Dynamics. He works on everything from mice that can withstand high temperatures to a weapon made from pumpkins. After successfully making pumpkins lethal, and creating an office chair that is so uncomfortable it makes people work harder, Veronica wants Ted to work on a new project, freezing Phil, one of Ted's scientists, cryogenically, just to see if it's possible. Phil at first not wanting to do it, talks it over with his wife, who is surprisingly enthusiastic about the idea. Meanwhile, at work Ted discovers that Linda is stealing creamer from the office as a way to "get back" at the company. Later at home, Ted's daughter, Rose, talks to Ted— who is having problems with the ethics of freezing one of his own employees. Rose convinces Ted that it shouldn't be done, however the next day at work, despite Ted's pleas, Phil goes through with it and freezes himself. While watching Phil freeze, Ted and Linda have a moment where they hold hands, however both try to hide it. After three days, the company decides to break its promise that Phil can stay in the lab, and decides to move him. The two janitors drop the tube when one of them answers his cell phone, and Phil thaws, with no memory of what happened to him. Everyone is ordered not to tell Phil what happened to him and Phil is put back into regular work, with one problem. At random moments throughout the day he will stop, and start screeching without realizing it.

== Reception ==
=== Viewership ===
The pilot episode was watched by 5.64 million American viewers with a household rating of 3.6.

=== Critical reception ===
General reception of the pilot of Better Off Ted was positive, with The Hollywood Reporter saying, "Better Off Ted has the fresh and lively feel of something great being born...". They also credited Portia de Rossi with a good performance, by "...being able to make a cold assassination funny, something that is very hard to do." Linda Stasl of the New York Post gave the show a very positive review, saying that, "Veridian, a company so morally challenged that it would make Michael Clayton run for cover." Alan Sepinwall gave a mediocre review saying, "For the seven of you who remember Andy Richter, Better Off Ted isn't quite as good -- in part because star Jay Harrington isn't as innately funny as Richter (and he's mainly used as a straight man), and also because Fresco ditched the fantasy scenes that were often the most memorable part of the earlier series -- but it's still a breath of fresh air in the present stale environment for TV comedy, as well as an accidentally timely show." Matt Fowler of IGN gave a slightly more negative review saying, "This show is amusing, but not in enough of a manner that makes me want to keep up with it."
