= List of Better Off Ted characters =

The following is a list of characters in the ABC sitcom Better Off Ted.

Better Off Ted's main cast. From left to right: Phil, Linda, Ted, Veronica and Lem.

== Primary characters ==
=== Ted Crisp ===
Theodore Margaret "Ted" Crisp (Jay Harrington) is the successful and yet conscientious head of research and development at Veridian Dynamics. He has been a single father to his daughter Rose, after a hostile break-up with his wife Stacy (who left to "save the world"). He frequently mentions his strained relationship with his father, who has always been disappointed in Ted for pursuing academic interests rather than following in his footsteps to become a plumber. Ted has a somewhat liaison-like position between the workers and the management of Veridian smoothing out the demands and expectations made on the other. Despite her aloofness, he is very close to Veronica and often acts as her confidant and conscience, and the two once had a brief sexual affair that on at least one later occasion they attempt to rekindle; this later complicates Ted's feelings for Linda as he instigates a "one office affair" rule that prevents him from pursuing a relationship with Linda until the very end of the series.

=== Veronica Palmer ===
Veronica Palmer (Portia de Rossi) is Ted's boss. She's confident, commanding, terrifyingly intelligent and slavishly devoted to the company. But she has a softer side that she's not comfortable dealing with. Though she once had an "office affair" with Ted, she prides herself on her ability to detach herself emotionally from her employees, actively cultivating an image of being devoid of conscience, and willing to do anything to advance herself and the company. Despite this, she does use Ted as an advisor on some of the more "touchy-feely" parts of her job, and often surreptitiously aids him and her other employees when needed.

While she often leads initiatives that put the employees in danger, she isn't totally heartless. Despite her insistence that everything she does is “for the company,” she sometimes quietly intervenes to help the other members of her department, although usually only after consultation with Ted. She denies any emotional motivation for these benevolent acts, though, often describing them as being in the best interests of the company, though numerous episodes reveal this to be an act. Nonetheless, she bonds with Ted's daughter Rose in the first season, and in season 2 even finds herself dealing with belated guilt over the possibility she had been given her management position by mistake.

Veronica has a strained relationship with her family. She feeds her sister while the sibling is asleep, in order to remain the thinner one. Her father owns a rival company, and the two often steal inventions from one another and pass them off as their own prompting identical retribution; this continues (with mutual consent) even after she learns her father only has a year to live. During the first season, we learn that she is involved in a long-distance relationship with a magician, Mordor; the relationship collapses in season 2 when Ted catches Mordor carrying on an affair with another Veridian employee. The second season reveals that Veronica harbors aspirations to be a singer, with one of her songs, taken from a CD she recorded, even being played in the company elevator.

As the series progresses, despite her conscious (and unconscious) efforts to the contrary, she grows closer to Ted and Linda, acting as a confidante for the former and a mentor for the latter; particularly during the second season she is often shown letting down her guard with Ted.

=== Linda Zwordling ===
Linda Katherine Zwordling (Andrea Anders) is in the testing department at Veridian. Originally from Wisconsin where she used to work in cheese-making, she seems to desire a relationship with Ted, but is frustrated by his "one office affair" rule (though this is finally resolved in the series finale). She refuses to compromise her principles and is often the team's moral center. She always speaks her mind, and doesn't seem to mind offending people. She is often seen engaged in minor acts of rebellion against the company which she rationalizes as necessary to keep her sane, such as a recurring joke in the first season involving her stealing coffee creamer packages from the company coffee machines. She also finds herself, against her will, looking to Veronica as a mentor.

=== Phil Myman ===
Dr. Philip "Phil" Myman (Jonathan Slavin) is an emotionally sensitive man who is also one of the laboratory scientists in Veridian's Research Department. He is usually working or hanging out with Lem, who works with him on almost every project. He generally does whatever he can to be accepted and avoid conflicts. He is married, and makes frequent references to his unseen wife (similarly to Maris Crane from Frasier), who, based on Phil's comments about her, appears to despise him. In season 2's episode 6, "Beating a Dead Workforce", we learn she was a member of Mossad. Despite having a spouse, he seems to harbor a hopeless crush on Veronica. In "The Lawyer, the Lemur, and the Little Listener", he reveals to Linda that, long ago (presumably before he was married), during a summer job he had driving a meals on wheels van, he met a "sexually adventurous" 73-year-old woman, who "roughly" took his virginity.

After being cryogenically frozen ("Pilot"), he develops a tic where he would abruptly begin screaming, usually during a meeting. However, by season 2, the tic has disappeared. Phil initially lied to Lem and his other coworkers at Veridian, telling them he graduated from Massachusetts Institute of Technology, while in reality he attended the fictional University of Aruba. He is liked by Ted's daughter Rose, as seen when she does not want her father's company to freeze Phil. He also carries a friendship with Ted, and does not like to disappoint him, once saying that Ted is "like a god. Only it hurts more when he judges us". Phil will, at times, grow attached to his experiments, as mentioned by Lem in "Heroes", when he warns him not to name their "cow-less beef", "Blobby", reminding him of a past experiment that Phil dubbed "Chester the Carrot".

=== Lem Hewitt ===
Dr. Lem Hewitt (Malcolm Barrett) Lem is one of the laboratory scientists in Veridian's Research Department. He is best friends with his lab partner Phil, who works with him on almost every project. Lem is just as conflict averse as Phil, and seems just as willing to roll over and take whatever abuse the company has to offer. Lem and Phil usually work on inventions that border on the fantastic or impossible, like hover boots, "cow-less" beef or a cure for baldness that grows hair on anything it touches, like Ted's desk. Phil and Lem are best friends, so close that they often protect each other as a spouse or parent would. Lem tends to act purely based on logic, oblivious to the fact that not everyone views things as rationally as he does. Lem graduated from Massachusetts Institute of Technology and his mother is Stella Clifton, another very successful scientist. Lem does not tell people this in order to avoid her shadow, even when Veridian pursued her to work on a project.

== Recurring characters ==
=== Rose Crisp ===
Rose Crisp (Isabella Acres) is Ted's daughter. She often asks Ted questions that make him question Veridian's unscrupulous policies and practices (such as cryonically freezing Phil), acting as his moral anchor when he sometimes is pushed to put the needs of the company over his own conscience and friends and steering him back in the right direction. Despite this, Rose bonds with Veronica in an early episode and is later "manipulated" by both Veronica and Ted on occasion.

=== Dr. Bhamba ===
Dr. Bhamba (Maz Jobrani) is one of Veronica's employees. He is portrayed as an enemy of sorts to Lem and Phil, although at times they are seen working in the same lab room. Bhamba has, according to Lem, among other things, made warfare exponentially more horrifying. Bhamba is sometimes shown as being a little careless; his bio-computer leaked into the office, causing contamination. In Season 2, he has an affair with Stella Clifton, Lem Hewitt's famous scientist mother.

=== Chet ===
Chet (Terry Rhoads) is Veronica's boss, a stereotypical executive who takes everyone for granted and needs confidence, not weakness. Episodes in which Chet appears often show Veronica's attitudes and methods in a much more positive light in comparison.

=== Mordor the Unforgiving ===
Mordor (Mark Deklin) is Veronica's one-time boyfriend, a magician, and a huge fan of sex. Initially, Veronica would travel to Las Vegas twice every month to perform with Mordor, a fact she kept secret from her Veridian employees. Mordor likes sex more than he hates pain, and is willing to let Veronica injure him in order to cheat on her, as Ted discovers after he discovered Mordor carrying on an affair with another Veridian employee under Veronica's nose (after which Veronica "accidentally" shoots Mordor with a speargun). The two broke up after that.

=== Don ===
Don (Kristoffer Polaha) is Linda's on-and-off boyfriend. Linda used him to try to make Ted jealous, and broke it off with Don when she realized her plans weren't working.

=== Patricia ===
Patricia (Carla Jimenez) is a co-worker of Lem and Phil. She seems to be attracted to Ted. She joined the team to try to get Ted back into the system. Patricia seems to have a very pessimistic attitude towards things, thinking that everything dies.

=== Ryan ===
Ryan (Chip Chinery) is a security guard at Veridian Dynamics. His post is the science lab entryway. Ryan likes to draw people into conversations about any subject. Ted attributes this to the boredom of sitting at the security kiosk all day. Ryan considers Ted a good friend and his wife recently gave birth in the back of Ted's Mercedes-Benz E-Class. Ryan is uncompromising in his devotion to his job though, refusing to break protocol or "cross the system" because in his own words, "quite frankly, it's a great system."

=== Janet S. Crotum ===
Janet (Patricia Belcher) is the head of human resources of Veridian Dynamics. Janet follows the policy that Veridian is incapable of error and will never admit that a mistake was made. When a single-letter typo results in a new policy that leads to chaos in the office, Janet refuses to rescind it as that would suggest an error. Instead, Janet and Ted conspire to produce a new policy overriding the first (Janet becomes more open to this idea after the memo results in many people making fun of her name). She admires Ted's way of thinking (among other things), as revealed in another episode in which she assists him in getting his employment record reinstated after it had been deleted.

=== Sheila ===
Sheila (Merrin Dungey) is a co-worker of Linda as well as an avid cat-lover. She sometimes clashes with Linda and even accuses her of sexual harassment after she invades her personal space. Sheila considers herself to not be very physically affectionate and is viewed as an oddball by Ted.

=== Debbie ===
Debbie (Vivian Bang) is a very shy woman and cat-lover who appears in a couple of episodes, most notably being given extra confidence by the "offensive language" memo.
