= Norman (soundtrack) =

Norman (Original Motion Picture Soundtrack)

Soundtrack album by Andrew Bird
- Released: October 11, 2011
- Recorded: 2009–2010
- Genre: Film soundtrack; film score
- Length: 50:31
- Label: Mom + Pop Music
- Producer: Andrew Bird

Andrew Bird chronology
Noble Beast (2009)	Norman (2011)	Break It Yourself (2012)

Norman (Original Motion Picture Soundtrack) is the soundtrack album to the 2011 film Norman directed by Jonathan Segal, starring Dan Byrd, Emily VanCamp, Adam Goldberg, and Richard Jenkins. The album featured the original score composed by Andrew Bird (in his film scoring debut) and songs performed by The Blow with Richard Swift, Chad VanGaalen and Wolf Parade. The soundtrack was released through Mom + Pop Music on October 11, 2011.

== Background ==
Norman's original score and songs were composed by multi-instrumentalist Andrew Bird. It was his maiden composition for a feature film. Bird had been approached by several producers to compose for films, but finalized on composing for this film as he found it to be good, and legitimately attempted to try film scoring and understand the process as well. He elaborated the process, as "just had the monitor in the studio with me and played live to the scene."

Bird considered Norman to be an up-close, personal, character drama and tackles the high-school genre without being lame. Though, in a BBC interview, Bird claimed that Norman would be his first and last film he would score for, he in a later interview, clarified about scoring for a "more zoomed out, a little more pastoral, some sweeping epic" kind of films, while also aspired to work on directorials by Terrence Malick, Jim Jarmusch and Paul Thomas Anderson.

== Release ==
The soundtrack, besides featuring Bird's score and songs, also included acts from The Blow with Richard Swift, Chad VanGaalen and Wolf Parade. A cue "Night Sky" was released as a single on October 4, 2011, while the album was released through Mom + Pop Music on October 11, 2011.

== Reception ==
Rachel Maddux of Pitchfork rated 7.3 out of 10 and wrote "A soundtrack taken apart from its movie is a funny thing, especially one working in such familiar territory as Norman. It's not hard to imagine the scenes these songs must play over on screen [...] At the very least, it's beautiful." David Amaddon of PopMatters rated 7/10 and wrote "It's really about as beautiful and fun to listen to as you'd expect. Having seen the film or not."

Jake Cohen of Consequence assigned a C+ rating to the album, saying "Bird follows a general formula of minimalist background sounds underneath deeply moody and passionate violin melodies. The former paint a cold, grey picture, while the latter breathe life and personality into the otherwise dour soundscapes." Ray Finlayson of Beats Per Minute assigned 71 (out of 100) and wrote "the soundtrack can at least be added to Bird’s back catalogue, hopefully as he takes another step somewhere more melodic and memorable than his work for the big screen."

James Christopher Monger of AllMusic rated 3.5 out of 5 and said that "Scoring Norman, could have been an exercise in soul crushing melancholy, and while there is enough of that here to fill a bucket or two with string-induced tears, Bird knows when to pick up the pieces, put your sack on your back, and whistle your way back home." Andy Webster of The New York Times noted that the film has a "probing, thoughtful score by Andrew Bird, with understated songs by Mr. Bird, Wolf Parade and others". Bill Weber of Slant Magazine wrote "indie composer Andrew Bird's score employs whistling and horns pleasantly enough".

== Track listing ==
No.	Title	Artist(s)	Length
1.	"Scotch and Milk"		2:20
2.	"3:36"		1:49
3.	"Arcs and Coulombs"		2:08
4.	"Hospital"		3:40
5.	"S.O.S."	The Blow with Richard Swift	4:37
6.	"Nice Hat / Exit Sign / Angelo Speaks"		1:35
7.	"Medicine Chest"		1:29
8.	"The Kiss / Time and Space/Waterfall"		2:40
9.	"You Are a Runner and I Am My Fathers Son" (Redux)	Wolf Parade	3:38
10.	"Cancerboy Strikes Again / Monsterstream"		1:19
11.	"Rabid Bits of Time"	Chad VanGaalen	3:28
12.	"Build Up to the Fall"		3:52
13.	"Epic Sigh / The Python Connection"		2:45
14.	"The Bridge"		3:16
15.	"Night Sky"		4:07
16.	"Afterspeak / Things Come to a Head"		2:41
17.	"Darkmatter"		5:07
Total length:			50:31

== Release history ==
Release history and formats for Norman (Original Motion Picture Soundtrack)
Region	Date	Format(s)	Label(s)	Ref.
Various	October 11, 2011	Digital download; streaming	Mom + Pop Music	
Various	November 1, 2011	CD; LP	Mom + Pop Music	
