= Beyond the Blackboard =

Television drama film

- Written by: Camille Thomasson
- Directed by: Jeff Bleckner
- Starring: Emily VanCamp; Steve Talley; Timothy Busfield; Julio Oscar Mechoso; Nicki Aycox; Treat Williams
- Country of origin: United States
- Original language: English

Production
- Producers: Brent Shields & Gerald R. Molen
- Running time: 97 minutes
- Production company: Hallmark Hall of Fame

Original release
- Network: CBS
- Release: April 24, 2011

Related
- The Lost Valentine; Have a Little Faith

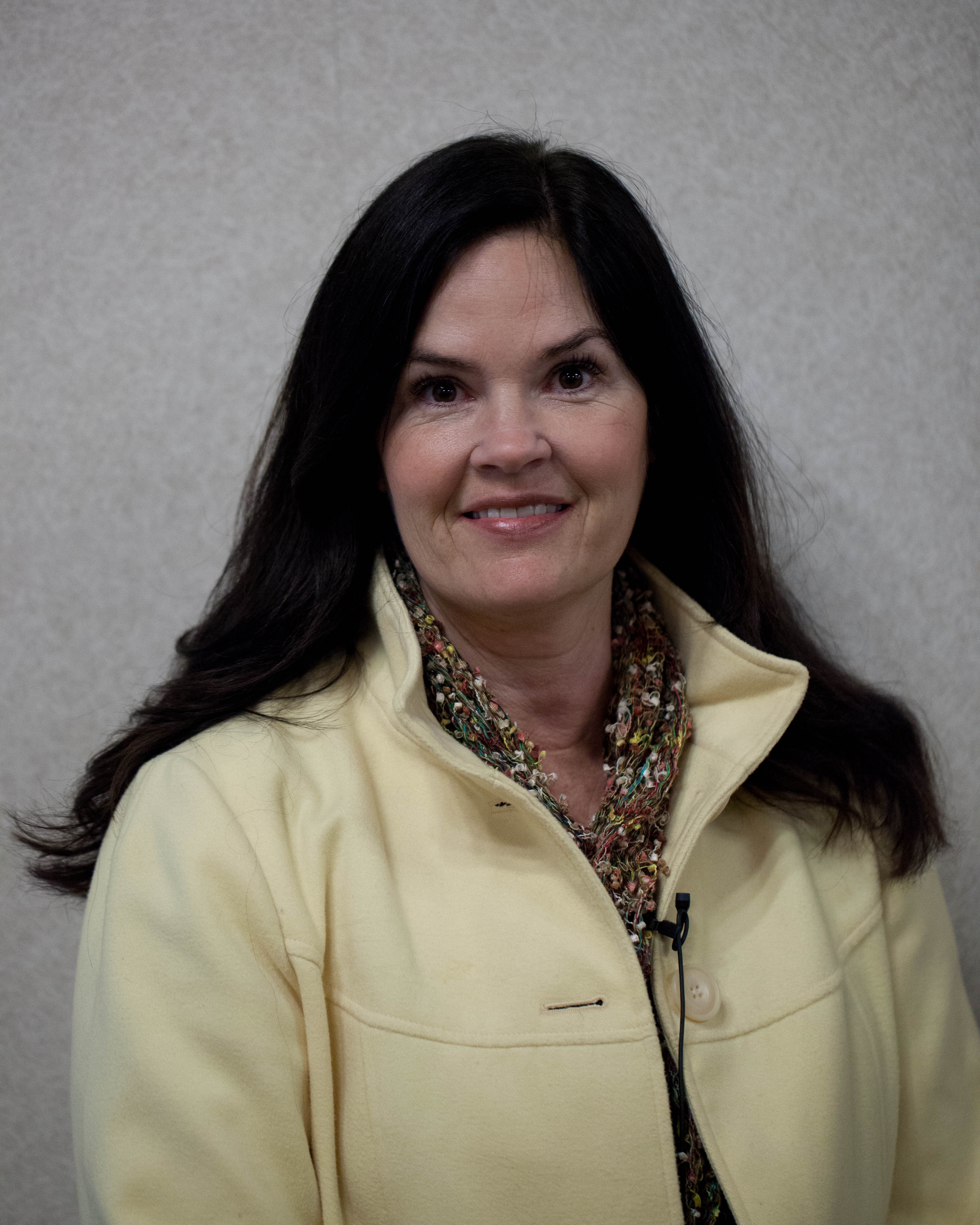
Stacey Bess

Beyond the Blackboard is a 2011 Hallmark Hall of Fame made-for-television drama film starring Emily VanCamp and Treat Williams. It is based on the memoir by Stacey Bess titled Nobody Don't Love Nobody.

== Plot ==
The story takes place in 1987 and follows a young teacher and mother of two who, fresh from college, ends up teaching homeless children at a school without a name. With the support of her husband, she overcomes fears and prejudice to give these children the education they deserve.

== Filming ==
This film was filmed in and around Albuquerque, New Mexico.

This was the first project together for Emily VanCamp and Treat Williams since Everwood.

== Cast ==
- Emily VanCamp as Stacey Bess
- Steve Talley as Greg Bess
- Timothy Busfield as School District HR Representative
- Julio Oscar Mechoso as Johnny Hernandez
- Nicki Aycox as Candy
- Kiersten Warren as Danny’s Mom
- Treat Williams as Dr. Warren
- Liam McKanna as Danny
- Paola Andino as Maria
- Luis Jose Lopez as Carlos
- Deidrie Henry as Patricia
- Luce Rains as Joe
- Mat Greer as Nelson Parker
- Savannah McReynolds as Nicole Bess
- Colin Baiocchi as Brandon Bess
- Isabella Acres as Dana
- Jack Nation as Sam
- Willow Shields as Grace
- Leedy Corbin as Becca
- River Shields as Alex
- Brandon Sanderson as Robert
- Michelle Sawunyama as Angel
- Catherine Haun as Ms. Trumble
- Lora Cunningham as Bev
- Colin Jones as Sammy Lewis
- Judy Herrera as Dee
- Ashleigh Maes as 8 Year Old "Stacey"
- Julia Thudium as Beautiful Teacher
- Gorneth D'Oyley as Dana's Teacher
- Emily Choi as Mai Nguyen
- Fran Martone as Nurse
- Autumn Shields as Annie
- Melissa Schroeder as Terri
- Andrew Kolodziejski as Jack
- Jack Justice Brown as Boy with Glasses
- Marie Magestro as Girl Student
- Caitlin Ribbans as Another Girl Student

== Release ==
The film aired on April 24, 2011 on CBS; it was the last Hallmark Hall of Fame film broadcast on that network, which cancelled the series due to low ratings.
