= Emily VanCamp =

Canadian actress (born 1986)

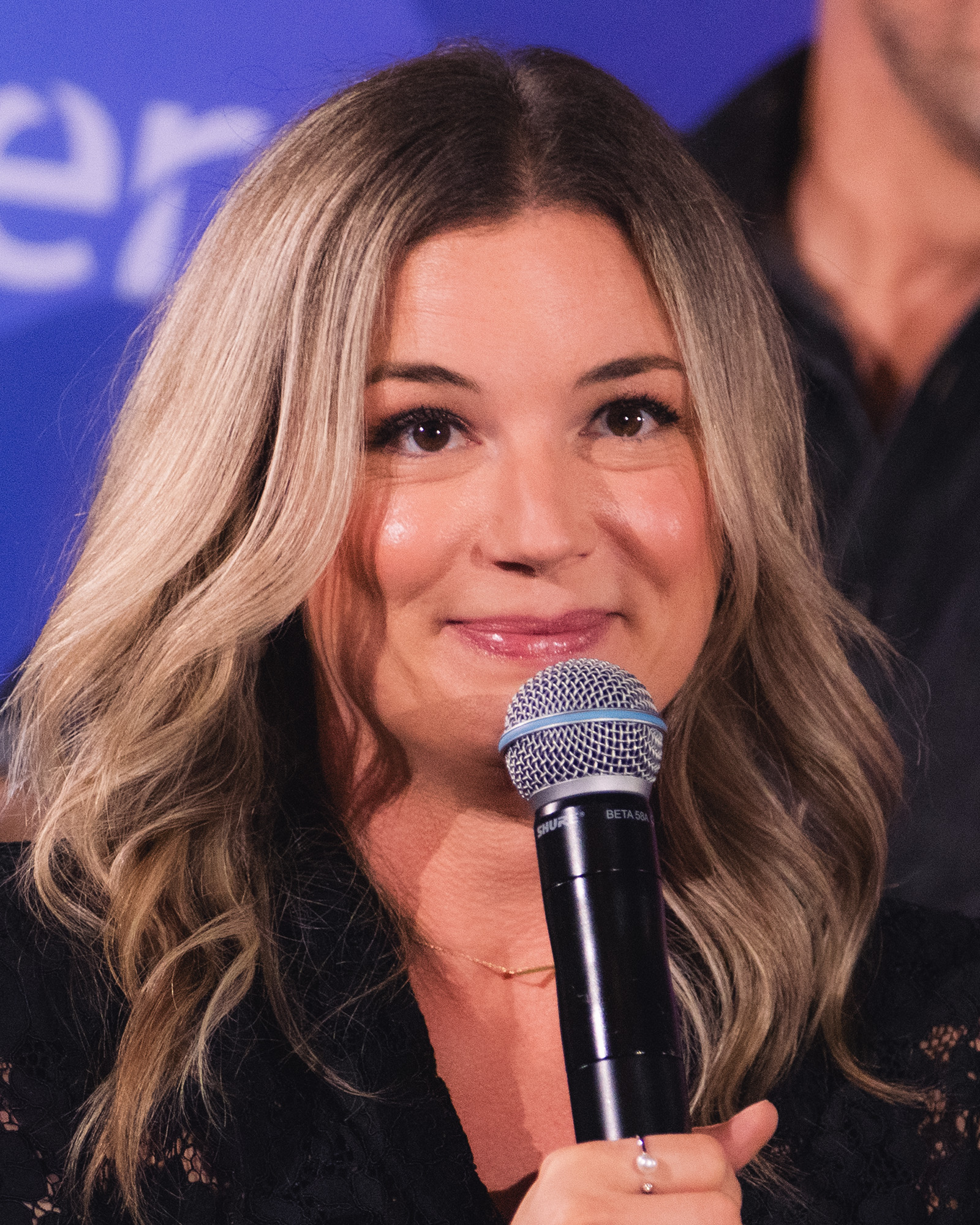
- VanCamp in 2026
- Born: Emily Irene VanCamp; May 12, 1986 (age 40); Port Perry, Ontario, Canada
- Education: École supérieure de ballet du Québec
- Occupation: Actress
- Years active: 1998–present
- Spouse: Josh Bowman (m. 2018)
- Children: 2

Emily Irene VanCamp (/ˌvænˈkæmp/; born May 12, 1986) is a Canadian actress. She gained acclaim and international recognition for portraying the lead role of Emily Thorne on the television series Revenge (2011–2015). She also starred on the drama series Everwood (2002–2006), the family drama series Brothers & Sisters (2007–2010), and the medical drama series The Resident (2018–2022).

VanCamp has also appeared in various films, including Black Irish (2007), Carriers (2009), Norman (2010), The Girl in the Book (2015), and Boundaries (2016), as well as other television series such as Glory Days (2002). Since 2014, she has portrayed Sharon Carter in the Marvel Cinematic Universe, starting with Captain America: The Winter Soldier.

== Early life ==
VanCamp was born on May 12, 1986, in Port Perry, Ontario. Her father is an animal nutritionist, and her first job was working for him, delivering food to clients in and around her hometown. VanCamp started to dance at age three. At age 11, she wanted to become a professional dancer and convinced her parents to let her attend a summer training program in Montreal. When she was 12, she was accepted to the École supérieure de ballet du Québec, the training program of Les Grands Ballets Canadiens, and moved in with a French-Canadian family.

== Career ==
=== 1998–2002: Career beginnings ===
In 1998, VanCamp became interested in acting after visiting her sister Katie on the set of the film Ladies Room. She started taking acting classes on Saturday afternoons, found an agent, and worked on a few commercials. She then was cast in the second part of a special three-part episode of the Canadian children's horror anthology television series Are You Afraid of the Dark? called "The Silver Sight", in which she played opposite a 17-year-old Elisha Cuthbert. VanCamp's character was present in one scene and did not speak any dialogue.

VanCamp followed this with a role as a teenage Jackie Bouvier in the Emmy-nominated CBS TV movie Jackie Bouvier Kennedy Onassis and a guest spot on the YTV sitcom Radio Active. The following year saw the release of her first theatrical film, the lesbian-themed drama Lost and Delirious, in which she played a supporting role as Jessica Paré's sister, and another television guest spot in an episode of the short-lived medical horror series All Souls, where she played a hit-and-run victim with spinal trauma. VanCamp also had roles in the miniseries Dice, directed by Rachel Talalay, and in the TV film Redeemer, directed by Graeme Clifford, which aired in early 2002.

=== 2003–2010: Breakthrough and television work ===
VanCamp's breakthrough came at age 15 when she was cast as Sam Dolan, a series regular role, in the WB mid-season show Glory Days (known in Europe as Demontown), the third TV series from Dawson's Creek creator Kevin Williamson. The horror mystery received mildly positive reviews, but was a ratings disappointment and was cancelled after nine episodes. VanCamp's performance as the lead character's younger sister caught the eye of former Dawson's Creek writer Greg Berlanti. Her performance reminded him of Katie Holmes, and he "desperately wanted to work with her". He cast her in his forthcoming first show, Everwood, also for the WB. VanCamp played Amy, Dr. Abbott's daughter, who immediately forms a friendship with Dr. Brown's son Ephram, played by Gregory Smith. A significant portion of the show was devoted to the relationships between the two families, and in particular to Amy and Ephram. She gained a certain amount of recognition for the role, in which her character was confronted with drugs, depression, and an alienation from her family, receiving four Teen Choice Awards nominations and one Young Artist Awards nomination during the course of the show's run.

While on breaks from Everwood, VanCamp starred in a few film projects, including the thrillers No Good Deed and A Different Loyalty, as well as Rings, a horror short film that bridges the events between The Ring and The Ring Two, and ties directly into her appearance in the opening scene of the second film.

VanCamp filmed the post-apocalyptic horror film Carriers in the summer of 2006, which was not released until 2009. Early 2007 had the broadcast of a season-eight Law & Order: Special Victims Unit episode, in which her drug-addict character Charlotte Truex cannot recall her actions on the night her mother was murdered, and the premiere of the independent drama Black Irish, where her character Kathleen McKay, the sister of lead actor Michael Angarano's character Cole, has to deal with teenage pregnancy.

VanCamp's next big role came at age 20 when Everwood creator Greg Berlanti cast her as a regular midway into the first season of the ABC drama Brothers & Sisters, which he was showrunning, offering her the part directly. The Jon Robin Baitz–created series chronicles the lives of the Walkers, a wealthy family who owns a food company. After their patriarch dies, it is revealed he has a secret child from a long-standing affair. Initially, it was believed that Rebecca Harper, played by VanCamp, is the secret child, but this was proven otherwise later in the series.

VanCamp remained a regular on Brothers & Sisters during the show's first four seasons and returned as a guest for a few episodes in the fifth and final season to wrap up her character's storyline. While working on the show, she found the time to star in the independent drama Norman in mid-2008, which earned her awards from the San Diego Film Festival and the Breckenridge Festival of Film, her only wins to date. The film has her playing the girlfriend of main character Norman Long, played by Dan Byrd, who pretends he is dying of cancer. VanCamp also starred in the two-part TV film Ben Hur, the latest adaptation of Lew Wallace's 1880 novel, in which she played Ben-Hur's wife Esther.

=== 2011–present: Revenge and other projects ===
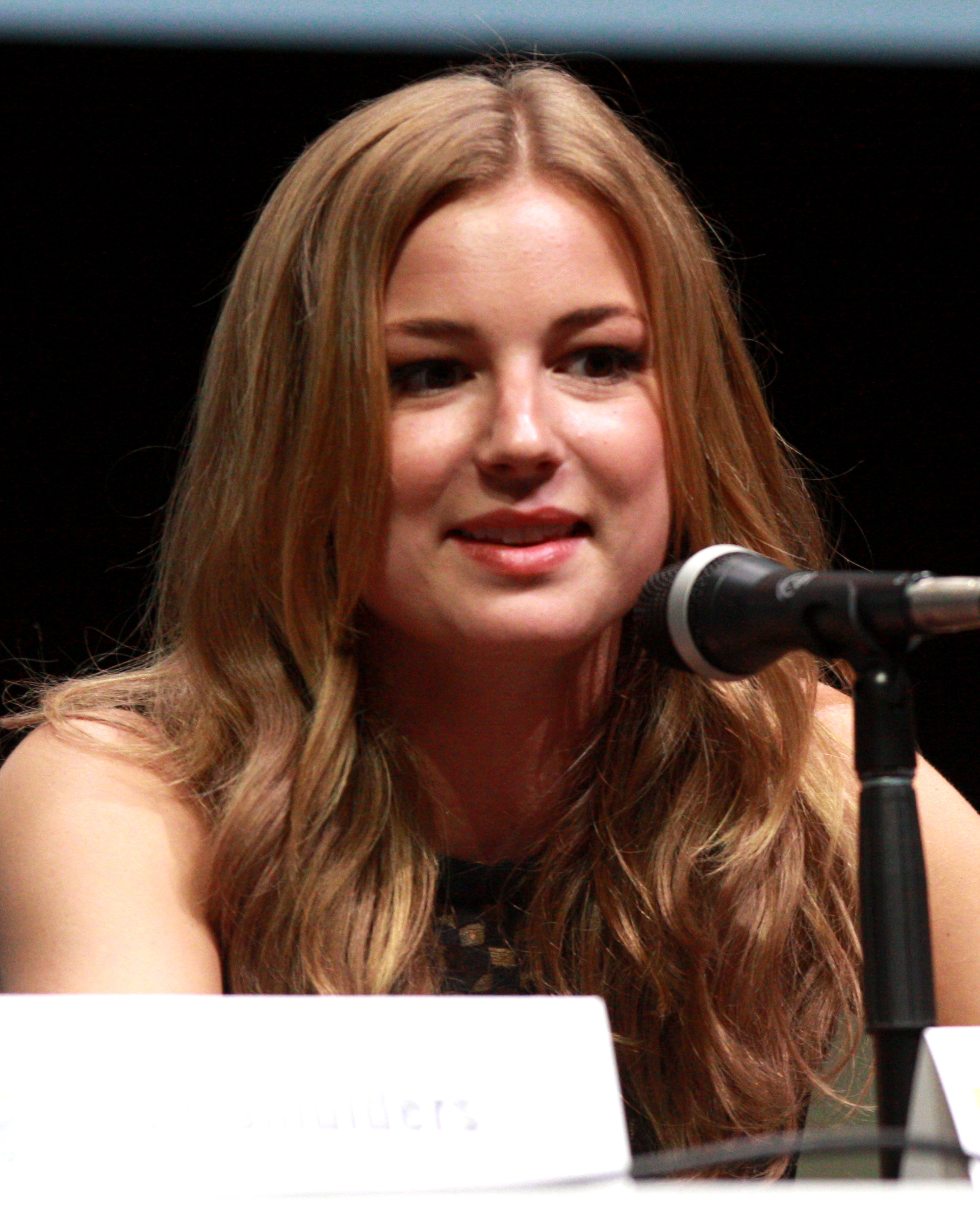
VanCamp in 2013

VanCamp starred in the Hallmark Hall of Fame film Beyond the Blackboard, based on the true story of Stacey Bess, whom VanCamp plays. The film aired on CBS on April 24, 2011. She was then cast as Amanda Clarke / Emily Thorne in the ABC drama Revenge, which was given a series order in May 2011. As the first TV show VanCamp truly headlined, Revenge gave her a significant amount of recognition, including multiple Teen Choice Awards nominations.

VanCamp co-starred in the Marvel Cinematic Universe film Captain America: The Winter Soldier as Sharon Carter, a potential loyal friend of Chris Evans' titular hero and the great-niece of Peggy Carter, played by Hayley Atwell. The film was shot from April through June 2013 and was released on April 4, 2014. VanCamp reprised her role in the 2016 sequel Captain America: Civil War, the 2021 Disney+ series The Falcon and the Winter Soldier, and the animated series What If...?

VanCamp starred in the independent drama The Girl in the Book, which started filming in mid-June 2013 in New York City. Based on a true story, the film centers on VanCamp's character Alice, a 28-year-old assistant book editor and aspiring writer. To fund its post-production, the film's producers launched a crowdfunding Kickstarter campaign on June 17, 2013, which successfully surpassed its $65,000 goal on July 1.

In 2016, she starred in the French-Canadian independent drama Boundaries, also known as "Pays" in French, which was her first bilingual role where she spoke in fluent French.

In March 2017, VanCamp was cast as nurse practitioner Nicolette "Nic" Nevin, the female lead in the Fox medical drama The Resident, whose character has a complicated romantic history and relationship with the main character, Conrad Hawkins, played by Matt Czuchry. In May 2017, Fox ordered the pilot to series. In 2021, VanCamp left The Resident after four seasons, to focus on her family, although she did return for the fifth-season finale.

== Personal life ==
VanCamp has three sisters. She speaks French fluently and has said she "feels at home" when she hears the language. She studied and trained in ballet, jazz, hip-hop, and tap dance as a child, which she credits with helping her through her fight scenes on Revenge.

VanCamp began dating English actor and Revenge co-star Josh Bowman in late 2011. On May 11, 2017, the couple announced they were engaged. They married on December 15, 2018, in the Bahamas. In 2021, VanCamp announced the birth of their first child, a daughter, on her Instagram account. In 2024, VanCamp gave birth to their second daughter. VanCamp is an equal pay supporter and is involved in charitable efforts to help endangered tigers.

== Filmography ==
=== Film ===
Year	Title	Role	Notes
2001	Lost and Delirious	Allison Moller	
2002	No Good Deed	Connie	
2004	A Different Loyalty	Jen Tyler	
2005	Rings	Emily	Short film
2005	The Ring Two	Emily	
2007	Black Irish	Kathleen McKay	
2009	Carriers	Kate	
2010	Norman	Emily Harris	
2014	Captain America: The Winter Soldier	Sharon Carter / Agent 13	
2015	The Girl in the Book	Alice Harvey	
2016	Captain America: Civil War	Sharon Carter	
2016	Boundaries	Emily Price	
2023	Miranda's Victim	Ann Weir	
2027	Little Audrey		

=== Television ===
Year	Title	Role	Notes
2000	Jackie Bouvier Kennedy Onassis	Jackie Bouvier	Television film
2000	Are You Afraid of the Dark?	Peggy Gregory	3 episodes
2000	Radio Active	Becky Sue Drummond	Episode: "Bully for You"
2001	All Souls	Kirstin Caine	Episode: "Spineless"
2001	Dice	Johanna Wilson	Television miniseries
2002	Redeemer	Alana	Television film
2002	Glory Days	Sam Dolan	Main role
2002–2006	Everwood	Amy Abbott	Main role
2007	Law & Order: Special Victims Unit	Charlotte Truex	Episode: "Dependent"
2007–2010	Brothers & Sisters	Rebecca Harper	Main role (seasons 1–4), guest (season 5)
2010	Ben Hur	Esther	Television miniseries
2011	Beyond the Blackboard	Stacey Bess	Television film
2011–2015	Revenge	Emily Thorne / Amanda Clarke	Main role
2014	Marvel 75 Years: From Pulp to Pop!	Host	Television special
2018–2022	The Resident	Nicolette "Nic" Nevin	Main role (seasons 1–4), guest (season 5)
2020	The Disney Family Singalong	Herself	Television special
2021	The Falcon and the Winter Soldier	Sharon Carter / Power Broker	Main role
2021	Marvel Studios: Assembled	Herself	Documentary; episode: "Assembled: The Making of The Falcon and the Winter Soldier"
2021; 2024	What If...?	Sharon Carter (voice)	2 episodes
TBA	Prejudice	Liesl Wellington	Pre-production

=== Webseries ===
Year	Title	Roles	Notes
2026	Moving On	Dr. Julia Dawson	Main role

== Awards and nominations ==
Year	Award	Category	Work	Result	Ref.
2003	Teen Choice Awards	Choice TV Actress – Drama / Action Adventure	Everwood	Nominated	
2004	Teen Choice Awards	Choice TV Actress – Drama / Action Adventure	Everwood	Nominated	
2004	Young Artist Awards	Best Performance in a TV Series (Comedy or Drama) – Supporting Young Actress	Everwood	Nominated	
2005	Teen Choice Awards	Choice TV Actress: Drama	Everwood	Nominated	
2005	Teen Choice Awards	Choice TV Chemistry (shared with Gregory Smith)	Everwood	Nominated	
2005	Prism Awards	Performance in a Drama Series Episode	Everwood	Nominated	
2008	Gold Derby Awards	Ensemble of the Year	Brothers & Sisters	Nominated	
2010	Breckenridge Festival of Film	Best Ensemble Cast	Norman	Won	
2010	San Diego Film Festival	Best Actress	Norman	Won	
2011	ACTRA Awards	Outstanding Performance – Female	Ben Hur	Won	
2012	NewNowNext Awards	Next Mega Star	Revenge	Nominated	
2012	Teen Choice Awards	Choice TV Actress: Drama	Revenge	Nominated	
2012	TV Guide Awards	Favorite TV Couple (shared with Josh Bowman)	Revenge	Nominated	
2013	Teen Choice Awards	Choice TV Actress: Drama	Revenge	Nominated	
2015	People's Choice Awards	Favorite Dramatic TV Actress	Revenge	Nominated	
2016	Teen Choice Awards	Choice Movie: Liplock (shared with Chris Evans)	Captain America: Civil War	Nominated	
