= The Inside (TV series) =

- Genre: Crime drama Thriller
- Created by: Tim Minear; Howard Gordon
- Starring: Rachel Nichols; Adam Baldwin; Katie Finneran; Nelsan Ellis; Jay Harrington; Peter Coyote
- Theme music composer: Robert J. Kral; Andy Ross
- Composer: Robert J. Kral
- Country of origin: United States
- Original language: English
- No. of seasons: 1
- No. of episodes: 13

Production
- Executive producers: Tim Minear; David Nevins; Brian Grazer; Ron Howard
- Producer: Gareth Davies
- Cinematography: Ross Berryman
- Running time: 44 minutes
- Production companies: Imagine Television; Reamworks; 20th Century Fox Television

Original release
- Network: Fox
- Release: June 8 – July 13, 2005

The Inside is an American crime drama television series created by Tim Minear and Howard Gordon and produced by Imagine Television. The Inside follows the work of the FBI's Los Angeles Violent Crimes Unit (VCU), a division dedicated to investigating particularly dangerous crimes. The Inside initially aired on the Fox Network from June 8 to July 13, 2005. Although thirteen episodes were produced, Fox aired only seven episodes before canceling the series. Thirteen episodes were subsequently aired on ITV4 in the UK in 2006.

== Premise ==
Rookie FBI Agent Rebecca Locke (Rachel Nichols) joins the Los Angeles Violent Crimes Unit (VCU) after the death of a previous member. While she proves to be a brilliant investigator, she has a secret known only to herself and the VCU's mysterious director Virgil "Web" Webster (Peter Coyote): that as a 10-year-old girl, Rebecca was kidnapped from her home and held captive for 18 months. Astonishingly enough, no one found and rescued her; she escaped the trauma all by herself, setting a fire and escaping in the resulting chaos. Webster manipulates Rebecca's experience on each case, using the insight she gained through it to establish the mindset of the victim—and the criminal.

Another sidebar to the plot is the moral struggle between Webster, who seems willing to use Rebecca's gift to catch the "unsub" at all costs, and Rebecca's partner Paul Ryan (Jay Harrington), who views himself as the voice of conscience in the battle for Rebecca's soul. Additionally, Webster's past is very much unknown; viewers are left wondering exactly how much he has in common with the perpetrators he pursues.

== Cast and characters ==
- Rebecca Locke (Rachel Nichols) is the rookie field agent brought in by Web, who wishes to use her gift to his advantage. She is able to put herself in the shoes of the victims, since she was one herself. This makes her excellent at getting inside the mind of a killer. Series creator Minear described her as a "character with no inside," hence the show's title. With clear trust issues and a lack of a social life, she slowly grows to like her colleagues more as the series progressed.
- Danny Love (Adam Baldwin) is an ex-marine who is blunt and crude, but not without his own morals and has a certain rapport with Agent Melody Sim. He often leads assaults on crime scenes. Originally his name was to be Danny Coulter.
- Melody "Mel" Sim (Katie Finneran) is a quick-witted, intelligent and friendly agent who often mourns her lack of social life and shares a friendship with Danny.
- Carter Howard (Nelsan Ellis) is the technological go-to guy of the group, making an appearance whenever the team needs technological expertise.
- Paul Ryan (Jay Harrington) is a young, married agent who Web chose to be his 'conscience'. Idealistic and kind, he sees things in black and white. He is often paired up with Agent Locke, which leads him to discover her past secret. On more than one occasion, he and Web have clashed based on differing principles. Originally, his name was to be Paul Fatorre.
- Virgil "Web" Webster (Peter Coyote): The supervisor. He is not married as far as we can tell. He chose his squad based on their secrets, their weaknesses and their strengths. He is known to push his agents to the max, especially Agent Locke, much to the disgust of Agent Ryan. He is also known to bend the rules or justify actions.

== Production ==
Originally produced by Kathryn Bigelow, the original premise centered around a 23-year-old woman, Rebecca Locke (Rachel Nichols), posing as a 16-year-old high school student in order to investigate a drug ring. Peter Facinelli was also attached to star. In September 2004, it was announced that Tim Minear would redevelop the series as original creators/executive producers Todd Kessler and Glenn Kessler exited the series. It was also revealed that Brian Grazer, Ron Howard and David Nevins would executive produce the series. In December 2004, Facinelli opted out of the series after Minear revamped the premise to feature Rebecca Locke as young FBI agent working for the L.A. bureau's Violent Crimes Unit. Later in December 2004, Jay Harrington was cast, taking over the role from Facinelli; and Adam Baldwin joined the cast, who worked with Minear on Firefly. In May 2005, Fox announced the series would premiere June 8, 2005, airing Wednesdays at 9:00 pm. Fox aired seven episodes (although out of production order) before canceling the series due to low ratings.

== Episodes ==
Seven episodes originally aired on Fox between June 8 and July 13, 2005. The other six episodes that were unaired by Fox first aired in the UK on ITV4 in 2006.

Fox aired the episodes out of order. The episode listing below is the correct viewing order, not the airing order. Creator Tim Minear posted the correct episode order on his website.

No.	Title	Directed by	Written by	Original release date	Prod. code
1	"New Girl in Town"	Tim Minear	Story by : Tim Minear & Howard Gordon; Teleplay by : Tim Minear	June 8, 2005	1AJW01
When one of the profilers in the FBI's L.A.-based Violent Crimes Unit (VCU) is brutally murdered by a serial killer they've been tracking, rookie FBI Agent Rebecca Locke is recruited to join the team and help find the madman despite her lack of field experience. Unbeknownst to Rebecca, famed Supervisory Special Agent Vigil "WEB" Webster has personally selected her to join his rogue division - not for her impressive profiling skills, but because of a secret she's keeping. Web knows that Rebecca was abducted and held captive as a child, and the traumatic experience has afforded her unique insight into the mindset of villain and victim alike.
2	"Everything Nice"	Allan Kroeker	Jane Espenson	June 29, 2005	1AJW02
Web pits the team against one another when an 8-year-old boy is murdered in an exclusive gated community.
3	"Old Wounds"	Nick Gomez	Mark Fish	June 15, 2005	1AJW03
When a federal prosecutor who worked with Paul is found murdered, the VCU team takes up the hunt for a serial killer they suspect meets women through an S&M club patronized by a wealthy playboy to whom Rebecca is drawn.
4	"Pre-Filer"	Dwight Little	Rob Pearlstein	June 22, 2005	1AJW04
When a spate of murders targeting future serial killers start piling up, the VCU team find themselves matched against a cunning profiler who executes these would-be killers in the same way they would have killed their victims.
5	"Loneliest Number"	James A. Contner	Richard Hatem	July 6, 2005	1AJW05
When callers to a suicide hotline are murdered, Rebecca goes undercover to find the killer, while Paul fears that Web's influence on Rebecca may have deadly repercussions.
6	"Point of Origin"	Marita Grabiak	Karine Rosenthal	March 31, 2006 (ITV4)	1AJW06
The VCU team investigates a spate of deadly fires that point to a lovelorn arsonist and trigger painful memories of Rebecca's childhood abduction.
7	"Thief of Hearts"	Allan Kroeker	Tim Minear & Craig Silverstein	July 6, 2005	1AJW07
Paul relives his first case under Web when someone copycats a murder by a serial killer currently imprisoned for removing the hearts of his female victims.
8	"Declawed"	Fred Gerber	Craig Silverstein	July 13, 2005	1AJW08
The VCU team tracks a serial killer who bites the fingernails off his victims, while Web, who is under investigation, uses his own methods to find the suspect.
9	"Aidan"	Kevin Hooks	Jane Espenson & Ahmed Lavalais	March 10, 2006 (ITV4)	1AJW09
When pregnant women are founded murdered with their unborn babies missing, the VCU team tracks a killer who may be trying to replace her own miscarried child.
10	"Little Girl Lost"	Karen Gaviola	Tim Minear & Craig Silverstein	March 17, 2006 (ITV4)	1AJW10
Rebecca must face her demons after the rescue helicopter carrying herself and Danny crash-lands in the woods as they search for a young girl and her kidnapped family.
11	"The Perfect Couple"	Vern Gillum	Ben Edlund	March 24, 2006 (ITV4)	1AJW11
When four ladies are found murdered after visiting the same nightclub, Rebecca goes undercover but discovers the perpetrator doesn't fit the profile.
12	"Gem"	Kevin Hooks	Story by : Bob Hamer; Teleplay by : David Fury & Jane Espenson	April 7, 2006 (ITV4)	1AJW12
When a slasher snuff film gets into a 10-year-old boy birthday party, Web's team investigates to discover whether or not the girl in the film is really dead. What they find is unfortunately much scarier than a horror movie...
13	"Skin and Bone"	Dwight Little	Story by : Tim Minear; Teleplay by : Jane Espenson	April 14, 2006 (ITV4)	1AJW13
Rebecca investigates missing anorexic girls, but it is a set-up arranged by the killer.
