= Robert Peters (actor) =

American actor

Robert Peters is an American character actor and director.

Peters was born in Tulsa, Oklahoma and graduated from Edison High School and the University of Oklahoma. As a teenager, Peters appeared at the Tulsa Little Theater. He is now a resident of both Oklahoma and California, and tries to shoot films in Oklahoma when possible.

He has appeared in films, television shows and commercials. His film credits include In the Line of Fire (1993), Ocean's Eleven (2002) and Lincoln (2012). The first feature film he directed was Half Empty, a musical comedy from 2006. He has appeared in at least 46 productions since 1988. Among the films shot in Oklahoma in which he appeared were Eye of God, the cockfighting film The Round and Round and the baseball movie Home Run (2013).

== Filmography ==
- Red Shoe Diaries (1992-1997), television series, two episodes
- Without Warning (1994)
- Go (1999)
- Open House (2004)
- The Last Run (2004)
- Bright Falls (2010), Alan Wake prequel mini-series
- Welcome to the Jungle (2013)
- Grand-Daddy Day Care (2019)
