= Amanda Swisten =

American actress

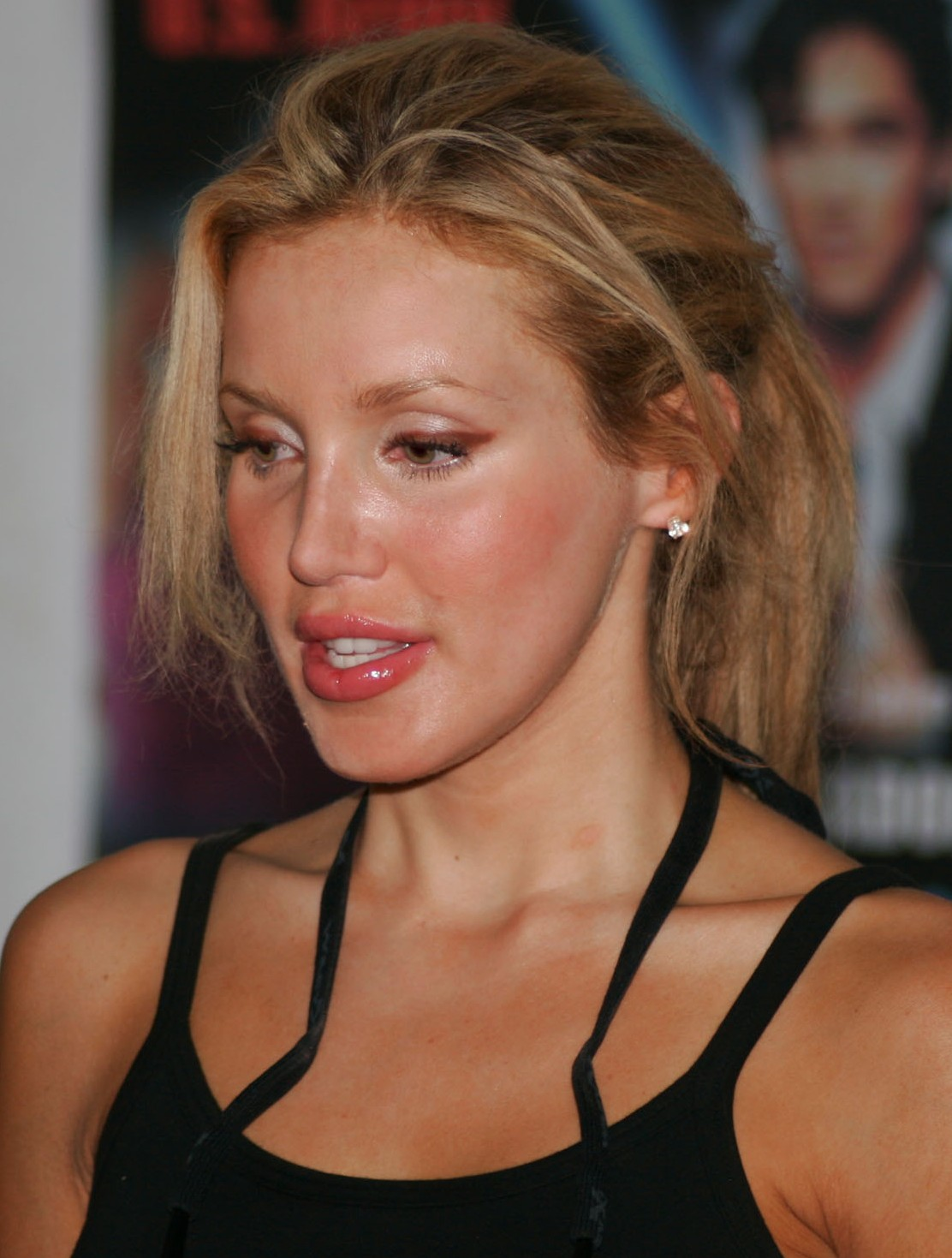
- Swisten in 2005
- Born: New York City, U.S.
- Occupation: Actress
- Years active: 2003–2006
- Modelling information
- Height: 1.75 m (5 ft 9 in)
- Hair colour: Blonde
- Eye colour: Green

Amanda Swisten is a former American actress and model born of Scandinavian ancestry. She was born in Manhattan. Swisten spent most of her childhood in Connecticut before she moved to Los Angeles to pursue her career in acting.

Swisten started her career in acting in the movie American Wedding. She is also known for her role in The Girl Next Door and Two and a Half Men. She also appeared in the music videos William Hung’s "She Bangs", Eminem’s "The Real Slim Shady" and Kid Rock’s "Bawitdaba". Swisten is also known for her modelling in magazines including Maxim and Stuff, and calendars including DreamsGirls and Women of Soccer.

Additionally, Swisten visited Iraq with Dean Cain during the Iraq War. They visited various bases spending 12 to 18 hours signing autographs and giving out T-shirts. In her spare time she enjoys reading forensic science, looking up cars and listening to music.

== Early life ==
Swisten was born in Manhattan, but grew up in Connecticut. She moved to Connecticut soon after she was born, where she spent most of her childhood. Swisten describes herself as a tomboy and a curious child, partaking in activities such as building forts and kickball. During this time she developed an interest in swimming at age 4. This interest led her to participate in swimming competitions at age 9, breaking records and briefly becoming a lifeguard.

At age 15, she moved to Charlottesville, Virginia as her family wanted a change of life. During this time she attended a private school, where she did not fit in. She describes this change as being shy and trapped like a wallflower. This occurred due to the school opposition towards the performing arts, an interest she accumulated when she was younger. She was also bullied by other girls her age. During this period she developed an interest for poetry, art and going to the gym. In an interview with Maxim, she stated that when she was a student she was also interested in science and medicine. She also volunteered at a sexual assault center to give herself a feeling of purpose.

At 16, Swisten worked at a gym, receiving aerobics and personal training certification. Upon visiting the mall with her mother she was approached by a scout who offered her a chance to model in New York. Swisten was unable to accept the offer, however instead got her mother to take pictures of her. Eventually she was able to move to New York to attend a drama school at the University of Virginia. Whilst she could have pursued a career in medicine and science, she couldn't see herself “wearing a labcoat somewhere”. Swisten also did an apprenticeship as a designer, and received a degree in interior design. She additionally possesses a license for interior design.

== Career ==
=== Acting ===
At the University of Virginia, Swisten took acting lessons from Judith Reagan. She then performed in theatrical performances such as The Cocktail Party, It's Just Sex, Grease, Brighton Beach Memoirs, Sound of Music, East and Sexually Perversity in Chicago.

Swisten made her debut in the music video "Bawitdaba" by Kid Rock, as a supporting role. She also appeared in Eminem's "The Real Slim Shady".

In 2000 she appeared in an unaired episode of the TV show Brutally Normal. Swisten also appeared on the TV show Backstage Pass, The Extreme Gong Show, Major Payne, Gold's Gym Healthtalk, CPR Training Series and Bolt Upright.

She also appeared in the 2001 film Rockstar where she was uncredited. She made her next appearance in the 2003 film American Wedding, where she played the stripper Fraulein Brandi alongside Nikki Ziering. In an interview, Swisten stated that “the whole movie was an experience”. In an interview with Stuff she describes how awkward the ordeal was for her initially. However she soon got into it playing the character with the intent to be “exploited…. But have some meaning obviously”.

In 2004 she portrayed April in The Girl Next Door. To prepare for this movie she went to Maxim parties to talk with porn stars. She also appeared in TV shows such as Two and a Half Men, I'm With Her, Quintuplets, Las Vegas and Joey. Swisten also appeared in The Last Run as Sage. Additionally she also portrayed William Hung's girlfriend in "She Bangs". Swisten, having prior dance experience, was told to “wing it” and base her entire performance around Hung. Swisten is also in 10 Things Every Guy Should Experience, and Love Lounge. Swisten also hosted the US bikini bowling team. 2005 marked her appearance in the movie Freezerburn, where she played Star Penumbra Gold the Talent. In 2006, she appeared in an unaired episode of Cracking Up as Candy Biscoe.

=== Modelling ===
Swisten began modelling at age 16 after a scout approached her, whilst shopping with her mother. Initially she got her mother to take pictures of her, due to her experience as an artist. Swisten appeared in the Women of Soccer 2001 calendar, as the cover girl for September. She also appeared on the cover of DreamGirls 2001 calendar and the Iron and Lace 2002 calendar. Swisten latered appear in magazines such as THE One magazine, the Swedish Imagine Magazine, Top Model, Cosmopolitan, Elle, Mademoiselle, Stuff and Maxim. In an interview with the Stuff she states that she dislikes modelling. Swisten claims that “ït’s really boring”, and “takes a toll on your body”.

=== Guest appearances ===
On March 9, 2005, Swisten was the first guest star on the Coast to Coast AM podcast. In the podcast she was asked by George Noory about her opinions on serial killers and how she became interested in forensic science. She was also asked by audience members of the show, about different questions related to serial killers.

== Accolades ==
=== Iraq War ===
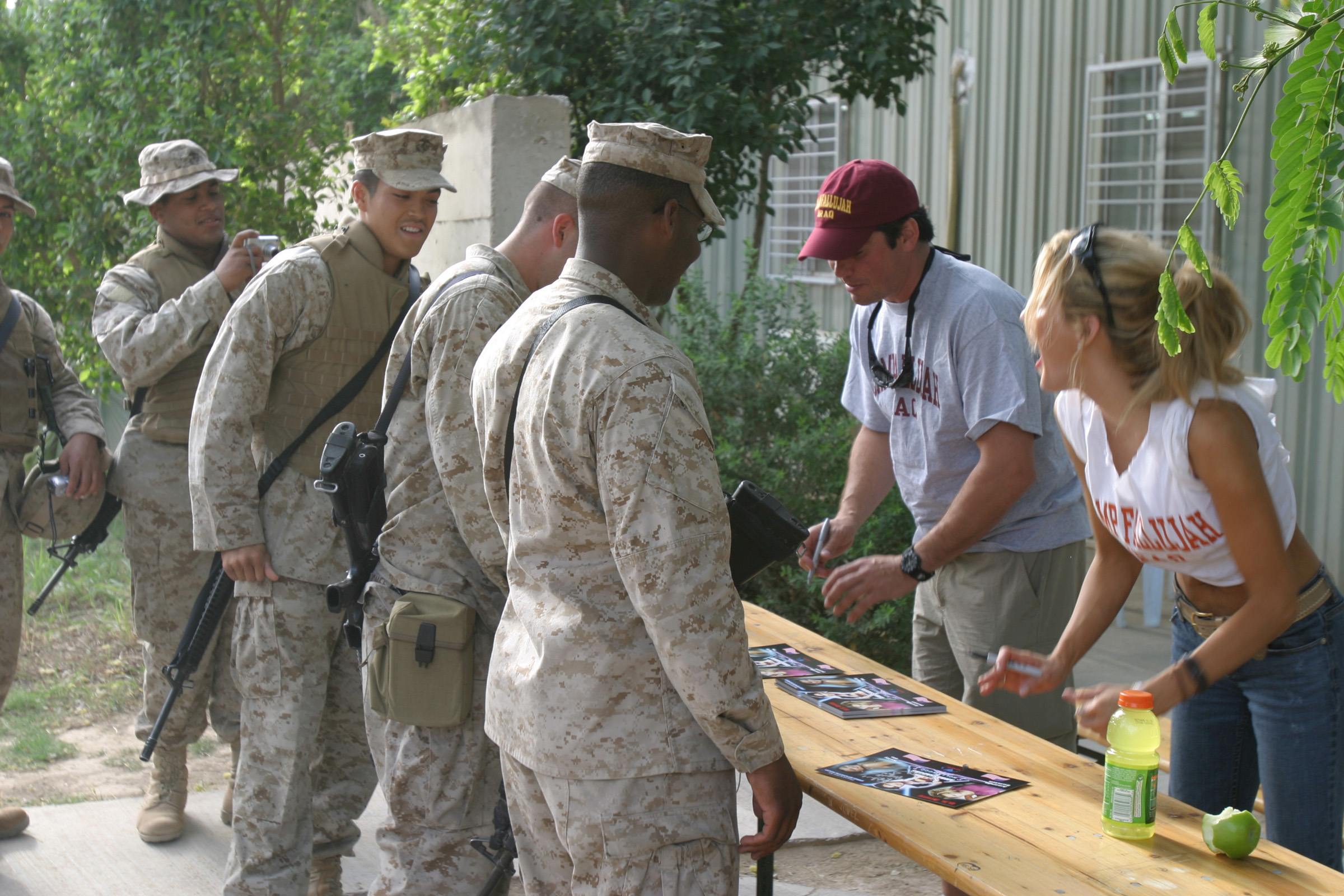
Amanda Swisten and Dean Cain signing autographs for troops at a camp exchange on May 15, 2005.

On the 10th of May 2005, Pro Sports MVP asked 500 celebrities if they were interested in spending two weeks in Iraq meeting American militia. Out of the 500, only Swisten and Dean Cain volunteered to go. Swisten was invited to go on a luxury cruise however rejected it due to the following reasons. She states that her reason for joining this cause was due to the initial support provided by the company when she first started out. Another reason she joined was because she lost friends during the 9/11 incident, and wanted to give back to the soldiers risking their lives.

During this campaign she was accompanied by two guards to ensure her safety. Swisten and Cain spent most of their time signing autographs, handing out merchandise and conversing amongst soldiers. She mentions that she would “say hello, pass out T-shirts, posters and sign autographs” to guards. Swisten also spent hundreds on cosmetics before the trip, in order to hand them out to female militia. They visited a variety of different bases close to the front and back line including: Forward Operation Base Bernstein and Forward Operation Base Sparta.

On 22 May 2005, they visited a base in Baghdad called Camp Tahji where they signed autographs, posed, socialised and dined with soldiers. During the camp's weekly boxing event Swisten announced that “The tour has given us a great opportunity to show our support for the troops”. They also witnessed the tragic side effects of war, in a hospital at Baghdad they visited a little boy and girl who were injured. The boy they met had been shot, whilst being used as a hostage. The girl had her leg blown off, after she chose to join the Iraq military. Swisten mentions that “both her and Dean broke down crying, because he had a little boy around the same age as the victims”. In various interviews, Swisten respects the soldiers. In an interview with the United States Department of Defence she states that “They have more courage than anybody I know back home”. She's also grateful for the experience stating that “This has been really grounding to see it for myself, that everybody here is out to do good work and serve their country, even though at the end of the day, they'd love to go home”.

=== Animals ===
According to her website every product bought from her website allowed a small sum of money to be donated to SPCA. Additionally she also supported animals during Hurricane Katrina, by raising awareness on her website.

== Personal life ==
=== Experiences with Fans ===
In 2004, Swisten was stalked by a fan. The fan managed to get her home address by using Swisten's website. Swisten states that “it was so frightening that the police had to get involved”. Because of this event she claims that she carries a gun everywhere, stating that she is "... a bad girl. I can hold my own. I grew up learning how to use a gun".

== Public image ==
=== Modelling ===
Swisten has been praised by both the media and individuals for her physique. The website Maxim stated that she is beautiful and a stunner to their audiences. Additionally her fans on her website have also praised her appearance. In 2004, she was ranked 99th place in Maxim's top 100 sexiest women.

She states on her website that her fashion sense is based on a girlie-girl and tomboyish style. For her tomboyish style she enjoys wearing jeans, classic white button-down men's oxfords, black boots, white t-shirts, ribbed wife-beater tanks, pearls and silver and turquoise jewellery. For her girlish style she wears dresses, skirts and high-heels. She also enjoys wearing vintage clothes, specifically “black leather biker chick-stuff flannel shirts and boxers”.

=== Acting ===
Swisten has portrayed porn stars and prostitutes in the films American Wedding, The Last Run and The Girl Next Door. She states that the casting director of The Girl Next Door, Malli Finn, was after the Victoria Secret type of look. She has appeared topless in American Wedding; however, in an interview she states that her breasts were prosthetic. Due to this scholars have used her as a representation of American culture within the early 2000s. Daniel K. Cortese and Pamela M. Ling uses her as an example when describing the effects of smoking and masculinity. In a thesis by Barikatul Hikmah, he uses her to express the requirements of masculine norms. She is also used by Díaz-Granados Prieto and Pablo Esteban as a benchmark for attractive women in their thesis.

=== Iraq War ===
During their visit they were praised by soldiers. Lance Cpl. Russ Bonham, an air traffic controller assigned to Marine Air Control Squadron 2, welcomed the arrival of Cain and Swisten, stating that “Occasions like this definitely benefit morale here”. He also states “Amanda Swisten is a sexy girl and after seeing her here I’m forced to go watch ‘American Wedding’ again.” She was also praised by her fans and general audiences. In a forum post by Zoomway multiple recipients praised Swisten and Cain. They claimed “that there needed to be more people like them”. On Twitter they were also praised by numerous soldiers a decade after the event occurred.

== Filmography ==
=== Film ===
Year	Title	Role
2003	American Wedding	Fraulein Brandi
2004	The Girl Next Door	April
2004	The Last Run	Sage
2005	Freezerburn	Star Penumbra Gold the Talent

=== Television ===
Year	Title	Role	Notes
2004	I'm with Her	Actress	Episode "The Heartbreak Kid"
2004	Two and a Half Men	Darlene	Episode "My Doctor Has a Cow Puppet"
2004	Quintuplets	Joela	Episode "Pilot"
2004	Joey	Miss Santa Fe	Episode "Joey and the Roadtrip"
2004	Las Vegas	Rachel	Episode "My Beautiful Launderette"
