= Vyto Ruginis =

American actor

- Born: Vytautas Ignacas Ruginis; April 17, 1956 (age 70); Wolverhampton, Staffordshire, England
- Education: University of Illinois (BFA); Yale University (MFA)
- Occupation: Actor
- Years active: 1985–present

Vytautas Ignacas "Vyto" Ruginis (born April 17, 1956) is an American actor. He is best known for playing vampire Russell Winters in the television series Angel in its first episode, "City Of", as well as for his appearances in CSI, Murder, She Wrote, House, M.D., The X-Files, ER, Law & Order, NCIS: Los Angeles and other television programs.

== Early life ==
Ruginis was born in Wolverhampton, England, to Lithuanian parents. He grew up in Cicero, Illinois. He received a BFA degree from the University of Illinois and an MFA from Yale University in 1982.

On September 12, 2015, Ruginis was inducted into the National Lithuanian American Hall of Fame.

== Career ==
Ruginis has appeared in such films as The Devil's Advocate with Al Pacino and Keanu Reeves, Cliffhanger with Sylvester Stallone, Broken Arrow with John Travolta and Christian Slater, Jumpin' Jack Flash with Whoopi Goldberg, The Fast and the Furious, Auto Focus, and many more.

In 2014, Ruginis appeared in the stage play In the Water, directed by Sharyn Rothstein.

== Filmography ==
=== Film ===
Year	Title	Role	Notes
1986	8 Million Ways to Die	Joe Durkin	
1986	Jumpin' Jack Flash	Carl	
1987	Burglar	K.E. Graybow	
1987	The Verne Miller Story	Fitzsimmons	
1987	Made in Heaven	Lyman McCray	
1988	Hot to Trot	Mr. Pandolfi	
1988	Slipping Into Darkness	Otis	
1989	Casualties of War	The Prosecutor	
1990	The Palermo Connection	Ted	
1992	Bad Love	Evan	
1993	Cliffhanger	FBI Agent Mathesen	
1994	Clean Slate	Hendrix	
1995	Last Gasp	Ray Tattinger	
1996	Broken Arrow	Johnson	
1996	Phenomenon	Ted Rhome	
1997	A Thousand Acres	Charles Carter	
1997	The Devil's Advocate	Mitch Weaver, Justice Department	
1998	Yakima Wash		
1999	The Secret Life of Girls	Daniel	
1999	Wishmaster 2: Evil Never Dies	Hosticka	
1999	The Insider	Junior Lawyer	
2000	Robbers	Dayton	
2001	The Fast and the Furious	Harry	
2001	The Glass House	Don	
2002	Auto Focus	Nickie D	
2004	The Last Run	Clancy	
2006	Home of the Brave	Hank Yates	
2007	The Gray Man	Detective Maher	
2008	Player 5150	Governor Elect Lanzelin	
2011	Moneyball	Chris Pittaro	
2012	Bad Blood	Sheriff	
2014	Lost Time	Mr. Coffey	
2017	Miracle	Bernardas	

=== Television ===
Year	Title	Role	Notes
1988	Star Trek: The Next Generation	Chief Engineer Logan	Episode: "The Arsenal of Freedom"
1991	Law & Order	Daniel Magadan, Jr.	Episode: "Confession
1994	Law & Order	Shep Watson	Episode: ”Snatched”
1999	Ally McBeal	Mr. Goodman	Episode: "Love Unlimited"
1999	Angel	Russell Winters	Episode: "City Of"
2000	CSI: Crime Scene Investigation	Phil Swelco	Episode: "Pledging Mr. Johnson"
2001	Private Lies	Bob	Television movie
2001	The X-Files	Lieutenant Bianco	Episode: "Medusa"
2002	Crossing Jordan	Stuart Felding	Episode: "As If By Fate"
2002	The West Wing	Mitch	Episode: "Arctic Radar"
2002–2003	Presidio Med	Tom Roback	4 episodes
2003	JAG	Agent Dawkins	Episode: "Meltdown"
2004	CSI: Miami	David Jeffers	Episode: "Innocent"
2004–2007	Law & Order	William Wachtler	Episode: ”Nowhere Man"/"Avatar"
2006–2007	ER	Paramedic Wright	3 episodes
2009–2023	NCIS: Los Angeles	Arkady Kolchek	29 episodes
2010	The Mentalist	Heaton Krupp	Episode: "Bleeding Heart"
2012	Blue Eyed Butcher	Philip Gross	Television movie
2012	Major Crimes	Detective Miller	Episode: "Reloaded"
2013	Shameless	Edward Gretsky	Episode: "The American Dream"
2014	Rizzoli & Isles	Christopher Carnahan	Episode: "You're Gonna Miss Me When I'm Gone"
2020	Deputy	King #2	2 episodes

=== Video games ===
Year	Title	Role	Notes
2017	Grand Theft Auto Online	Bogdan (voice)	The Doomsday Heist update
