= Norman (2010 film) =

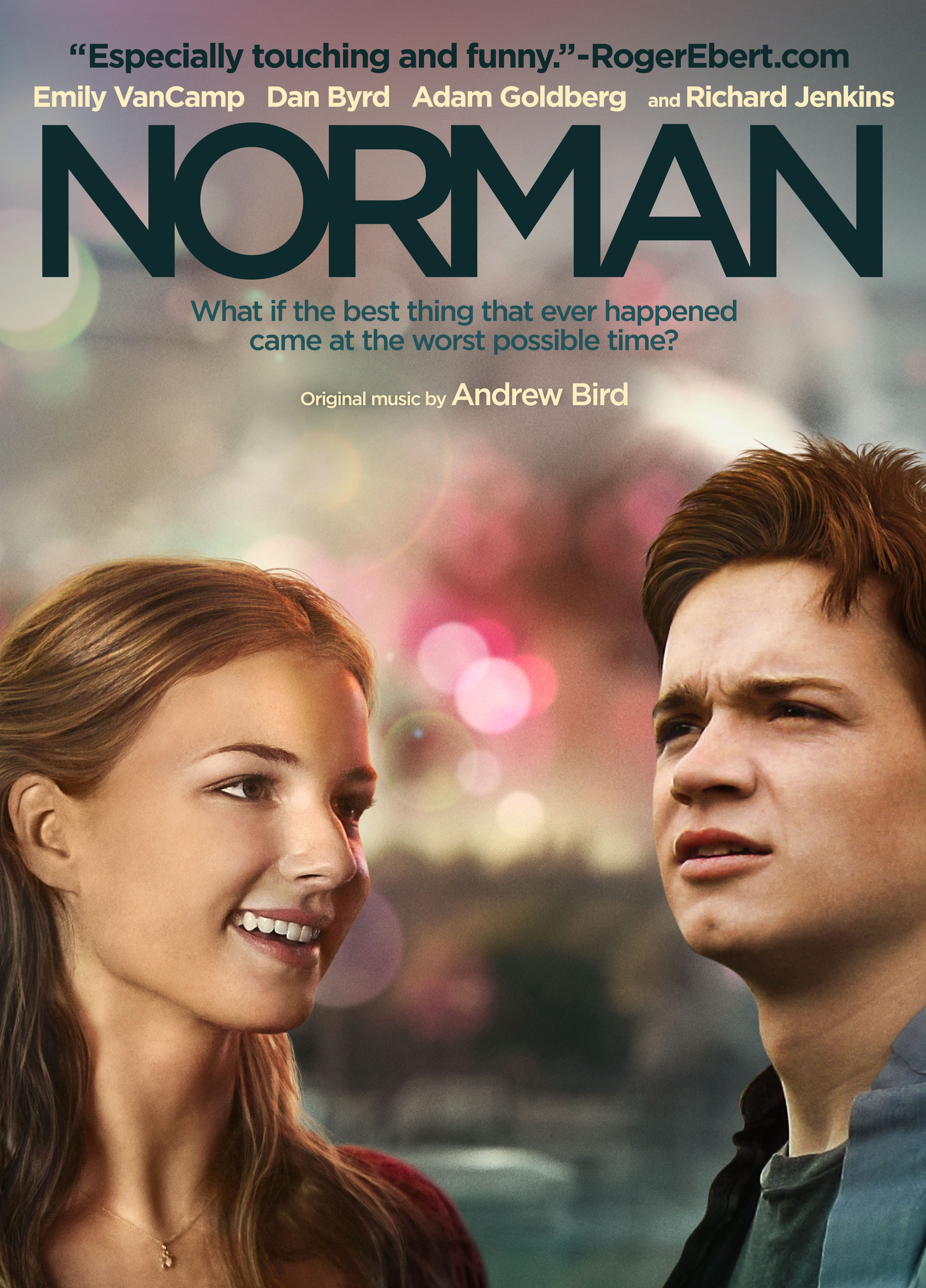
- Film poster
- Directed by: Jonathan Segal
- Written by: Talton Wingate
- Produced by: Jonathan Segal; Kim Blackburn; Dan Keston; Rich Cowan
- Starring: Dan Byrd; Emily VanCamp; Adam Goldberg; Richard Jenkins
- Cinematography: Darren Genet
- Edited by: Robert Hoffman
- Music by: Andrew Bird
- Production company: North by NorthWest Entertainment
- Release dates: June 11, 2010 (Waterfront Film Festival); October 21, 2011 (United States)
- Running time: 97 minutes
- Country: United States
- Language: English

Norman is a 2010 drama film directed by Jonathan Segal from a screenplay written by Talton Wingate. It stars Dan Byrd, Emily VanCamp, Adam Goldberg, and Richard Jenkins. It follows the titular protagonist, a young teenager faking his cancer in order to face the problems of his life and to deal with his father's terminal illness.

Norman was shot in Spokane, Washington in a four-week period. The film features an original score and songs by multi-instrumentalist Andrew Bird in his film scoring debut. The film was screened at various film festivals before its limited theatrical release at various locations in United States on October 21, 2011. It received positive reviews for its emotional depth, Byrd and Jenkins' performance.

== Plot ==
Norman is an alienated, but self-aware and outsmarted high school teenager who faces a tough life, as his mother died in a car accident and his father Doug suffering from stomach cancer. He then pretends to die from cancer so that he could cope up the realities of his daily existence. Though creating a persona as a loner, he is supported by his best friend James, a homosexual, his English teacher Mr. Angelo and Emily, a freshman junior, whom Norman befriends.

== Cast ==
- Dan Byrd as Norman Long
- Emily VanCamp as Emily Harris
- Richard Jenkins as Doug Long
- Adam Goldberg as Mr. Angelo
- Billy Lush as James
- Camille Mana as Helen Black
- Jesse Head as Bradley
- John Aylward as Robert Bessent
- Sewell Whitney as Dr. Malloy

== Production ==
"I'm interested in psychology and storytelling [...] The craft of filmmaking is a fusion of the two. Every time you approach a scene, you're trying to reverse-engineer an emotion: where do you put the camera, how do you want your actors to be, what do you want the audience to feel. It's like a Rubik's cube—there are so many different ways to approach it."

— Jonathan Segal on directing Norman

The film marked the sophomore directorial of Jonathan Segal, who made his debut with The Last Run (2004). One of his agents had presented him the spec script of Norman written by Talton Wingate and was fascinated by the "elements of adolescent psychology, the identity-changing experiences and the high stakes" which he further considered it "a great love story".

Segal auditioned numerous actors and actresses for the protagonist and his love interest, before finalizing on Dan Byrd and Emily VanCamp. Segal liked Byrd's choices and the approach to the character being "spot-on" while VanCamp was a chosen as the "perfect choice as the girl next door but who also has an enchanting quality". VanCamp did not have time to rehearse for the role owing to her commitments on the fifth season of Brothers & Sisters.

He expected Jenkins' casting would be difficult, but his agent liked the script and sent it to Jenkins, who then called Segal from London. They discussed the film and his role as Norman's father for about a half hour, and Jenkins signed on for the film the next day. Getting Adam Goldberg to play Norman's teacher involved a similar process.

Segal paid close attention to the tone of the film, avoiding being melodramatic despite its being a "heavy film" but also wanted certain things to be funny even in the darkest times. He wanted the audience to go through a broad spectrum of emotions, taking an emotional rollercoaster, but also wanted them to feel uplifted. In a sequence where Norman pretends to be a cancer patient, by shaving his head, which Byrd does on camera, Segal considered it as an exciting and logistical challenge, as that scene was shot in a single take. He added "it's one of those quintessential things for an actor: gaining weight for a role or shaving your head. Dan was nervous about it but it went pretty quickly. We had to prepare meticulously." The film was shot in Spokane, Washington, in 21 days within a four-week period.

== Soundtrack ==
The film's soundtrack features, in majority, songs composed and performed by multi-instrumentalist Andrew Bird, and three songs performed by other notable acts: The Blow with Richard Swift, Chad VanGaalen, and Wolf Parade. The soundtrack was released by Mom + Pop Music on October 11, 2011.

== Release ==
Norman premiered at the Waterfront Film Festival on June 11, 2010, and was then shown at fifteen other film festivals across United States, including Rhode Island International Film Festival, San Diego International Film Festival, Chicago International Film Festival amongst others. The film received a limited release across AMC Theatres in the United States on October 21, 2011. It was further released by Freestyle Digital Media in DVD and Blu-ray home media formats in early 2013. It was available on Netflix as of early 2019.

== Reception ==
=== Critical response ===
On the review aggregator website Rotten Tomatoes, 67% of 15 critics' reviews are positive, with an average rating of 6/10. Metacritic, which uses a weighted average, assigned the film a score of 60 out of 100, based on 11 critics, indicating "mixed or average" reviews.

Jon Frosch of The Hollywood Reporter wrote "Norman has some big things going for it, not least of which is the stupendous central performance, one of the most intelligent and deeply felt big-screen portrayals of a troubled teen in the last several years. The character lingers with you even after the film starts to fade from memory." Critic Roger Ebert wrote "The film will not be about these tragedies happening to him, but with how he deals with them. That’s a worthy change from a more ordinary teen movie." He complimented Jenkins' performance as the heart of the film, adding "even in unworthy roles, he has such strength, he never seems the need to try." Andy Webster of The New York Times wrote "Norman may not conquer the box office, but it will certainly be a worthy calling card for its director and its leading man."

Dennis Harvey of Variety wrote "Jenkins is fine as usual, Byrd appealingly antic and pained by turns; their familial rapport feels very natural. Likewise, Norman’s first romance is handled without cliched beats." Betsy Sharkey of Los Angeles Times wrote "It’s all too much to ask of a teenager who doesn’t even know how to drive, yet watching Norman learn how to manage a stick shift and life is definitely worth it." Bill Weber of Slant Magazine wrote "Alternately maudlin and snarky, Norman just doesn’t risk enough, and can be consigned to the status of what the school drama geek would call 'some contemporary, obscure, teen-angst thing.'" Joel Brown of The Boston Globe wrote "Whenever Norman and his father are onscreen, you can’t help feeling that there’s an even better, tougher movie inside “Norman,’’ trying to get out."

Lou Lumenick of New York Post wrote "Norman isn’t perfect — Norman’s suicide-themed theater-class monologue is sloughed off, which seems unlikely, and his autobiographical film-within-the-film is fairly trite. But there’s a winning emotional truth in the father-son scenes in this Spokane-shot sleeper, directed with skill and sensitivity by Jonathan Segal." Sam Adams of The A.V. Club wrote "Perhaps there was a disjuncture between director Jonathan Segal and screenwriter Talton Wingate, or the two first-timers didn't realize how difficult their movie-world premise makes it to take anything else in the film seriously."

Leor Galil of PopMatters wrote "Norman discusses confronting mortality in a way that’s far more affecting than most films this year." Jonathan Sullivan of The Film Stage wrote "There is definitely some good in Norman; Byrd and Jenkins give great and effective performances and there are scenes that are successful in manipulating your emotions (especially the third act, which I still can’t get out of my head). But despite the good, the overall blandness and cookie cutter feel of the movie ultimately undermines its positives. There is a market for a truly effective and profound coming-of-age story, something Norman strives for, but fails to be."

=== Accolades ===
Emily VanCamp won the Best Actress Award at the San Diego Film Festival for her performance in this film in 2010.
