= Better Off Ted =

Television series

- Better Off Ted's logo
- Genre: Satire; Science fiction; Dark comedy; Sitcom
- Created by: Victor Fresco
- Starring: Jay Harrington; Portia de Rossi; Andrea Anders; Jonathan Slavin; Malcolm Barrett; Isabella Acres
- Narrated by: Jay Harrington
- Composers: Chris Alan Lee; Scott Clausen
- Country of origin: United States
- Original language: English
- No. of seasons: 2
- No. of episodes: 26 (2 unaired in the U.S.)

Production
- Executive producer: Victor Fresco
- Producers: Marc Solakian; Skip Beaudine
- Production locations: Los Angeles, California
- Editors: Lisa Bromwell; Robert Bramwell; Peter Beyt
- Camera setup: Single-camera
- Running time: 21 minutes
- Production companies: Garfield Grove Productions; 20th Century Fox Television

Original release
- Network: ABC (episodes 1–24); Network Ten (episodes 25–26)
- Release: March 18, 2009 – August 24, 2010

Better Off Ted is an American satirical sitcom series, created by Victor Fresco, who also served as the show's executive producer. The series ran on the ABC network from March 18, 2009, to January 26, 2010.

Better Off Ted focuses Ted Crisp (Jay Harrington), beloved head of a research and development department at the fictional, soulless conglomerate of Veridian Dynamics. Ted narrates the series' events by regularly breaking the fourth wall and directly addressing the audience on camera. Supporting characters include Ted's supervisor Veronica Palmer (Portia de Rossi), co-worker and love interest Linda Zwordling (Andrea Anders), his daughter Rose (Isabella Acres), and laboratory scientists Phillip Myman (Jonathan Slavin) and Lem Hewitt (Malcolm Barrett).

The series received critical acclaim, with particular praise going towards its witty and satirical humor. Its second season holds a score of 84 out of 100 on Metacritic. However, despite such positive feedback, the show's debut drew in only 5.64 million viewers and continued to have extremely low ratings. Although many expressed skepticism that it would return, it was renewed for a second season. On May 13, 2010, ABC officially canceled the series due to low viewing figures. Two episodes that went unaired in the United States were broadcast in international markets and are available to view on Hulu, digital stores, and home video.

== Plot ==
Better Off Ted is a satirical workplace comedy, centred around the employees of a stereotypically evil megacorporation of Veridian Dynamics.

Veridian Dynamics experiments on its employees, twists the truth, and will stop at nothing to achieve its goals. It has been mentioned that Veridian has swayed presidential elections, created killer pandas and robots, and weaponized pumpkins, and that there are only three governments left in the world more powerful than Veridian. Although not promoted as such, and rarely the focus of storylines, the show's frequent references to futuristic technologies, killer robots, sentient computers, etc., places Better Off Ted partly in the futuristic comedy genre.

Most of the characters are fully aware of Veridian's nature, and often try to manipulate the system in order to stop bad things from happening to them (and sometimes to mitigate the evil effects of some of Veridian's projects). They are also all susceptible to the potential rewards the company can offer despite the consequences of their actions, such as the company's attempt to hire Lem's mother, or the company's introduction of scented light bulbs with known flaws. Much of the comedy of the show comes from the characters' navigation of these morally ambiguous areas.

Jay Harrington, who plays Ted Crisp on the show, serves both as a main character and as an on-camera narrator. Throughout the show, he breaks the fourth wall and speaks directly to viewers, offering inside information and observations while the action continues around him. Another plot element involves the use of mock commercials for Veridian Dynamics, thematically related to individual episodes and placed at the end or beginning of actual commercial breaks in most episodes.

== Episodes ==
=== Series overview ===
Season	Episodes	Originally released	
Season	Episodes	First released	Last released
1	13	March 18, 2009	August 11, 2009
2	13	December 8, 2009	January 26, 2010 (Note: This is the final date an episode aired on ABC. Two episodes left unaired by ABC later aired internationally.)

=== Season 1 (2009) ===
No. overall	No. in season	Title	Directed by	Written by	Original release date	Prod. code
1	1	"Pilot"	Michael Fresco	Victor Fresco	March 18, 2009	1APX79
Ted struggles to find the line between right and wrong, especially after the company decides to freeze Phil in its new cryonics chamber.
2	2	"Heroes"	Michael Fresco	Victor Fresco	March 25, 2009	1APX01
Ted and Veronica fake an award for Phil so he won't sue the company after getting frozen. Phil and Lem try to grow cowless beef.
3	3	"Through Rose-colored HAZMAT Suits"	Michael Fresco	Justin Adler	April 1, 2009	1APX02
Ted brings his daughter, Rose, to work, where she surprisingly bonds with Veronica. Meanwhile, Phil and Lem reexamine their working relationship and Linda's ex-boyfriend resurfaces.
4	4	"Racial Sensitivity"	Paul Lazarus	Michael Glouberman	April 8, 2009	1APX03
Ted discovers a glitch in the company's state-of-the-art sensor system, prompting Veronica and other execs to try half-witted (and racially insensitive) solutions instead of replacing the system.
5	5	"Win Some, Dose Some"	Michael Fresco	Elijah Aron & Jordan Young	April 15, 2009	1APX07
Linda is accidentally dosed with an experimental drug that gives her bursts of energy and unexpected side effects. Ted and Veronica try to outdo each other while helping Rose with a school fund-raiser.
6	6	"Goodbye, Mr. Chips"	Paul Lazarus	Becky Mann & Audra Sielaff	April 22, 2009	1APX08
Ted is inadvertently deleted from Veridian's system when he tries to fix his employee ID, and, as the lab falls into chaos, his peers try to remedy the situation.
7	7	"Get Happy"	Gail Mancuso	Mike Teverbaugh	May 5, 2009	1APX06
Veronica works on improving morale at the company and reinventing herself as someone more likeable after a survey reveals that the staff is miserable and Ted tries to win over an older demographic.
8	8	"You Are the Boss of Me"	Michael Spiller	Dan O'Shannon	June 23, 2009	1APX05
Lem and Phil reluctantly invite Ted to their Medieval Fight Club. Linda tries to befriend Veronica.
9	9	"Bioshuffle"	Michael Fresco	Michael A. Ross	June 30, 2009	1APX09
Tension occurs when Veronica, Linda, and Ted are forced to share offices. Lem asks Lucy, a beautiful scientist, out on a date.
10	10	"Trust and Consequence"	Lee Shallat-Chemel	Mike Teverbaugh	July 14, 2009	1APX10
Veridian blames Linda for a perfume with unexpected side effects, and friends fall out when they are forced to testify.
11	11	"Father, Can You Hair Me?"	Michael Fresco	Michael Glouberman	July 21, 2009	1APX11
Veronica's rivalry with her dad, the CEO for another big company, is out of control until she learns a shocking bit of news. Ted is thrilled that Phil and Lem may have discovered a cure for baldness.
12	12	"Jabberwocky"	Michael Fresco	Michael A. Ross	August 11, 2009	1APX04
Ted is forced to create a fake project for Linda rather than admit that Veridian lied in an advertisement about going green, but things go awry when other employees want to sign up.
13	13	"Secrets and Lives"	Michael Spiller	Dan O'Shannon and Mike Teverbaugh	August 11, 2009	1APX12
The team learns a shocking secret about Veronica when an invention goes awry. Meanwhile, Linda tries to set up Ted with another woman (played by Rachelle Lefevre).

=== Season 2 (2009–10) ===
No. overall	No. in season	Title	Directed by	Written by	Original release date	Prod. code
14	1	"Love Blurts"	Michael Fresco	John Hoberg & Kat Likkel	December 8, 2009	2APX06
Veridian Dynamics tries to match employees based on their genetic compatibility; Linda and Ted find themselves instantly attracted to their supposed matches and the company wants Phil to get a vasectomy but won't tell him why.
15	2	"The Lawyer, the Lemur and the Little Listener"	Chris Koch	Tim Doyle	December 15, 2009	2APX04
When a wave of layoff hits Veridian and little Rose seems to have inside info because of a friend in her aftercare Hive playgroup, Veronica tries to pump her for information, much to Ted's disapproval. Meanwhile, Linda secretly works on a comical lemur that looks strikingly similar to Phil, but finds out it has been approved for a Japanese beer commercial for children.
16	3	"Battle of the Bulbs"	Marc Buckland	Michael Shipley	December 22, 2009	2APX05
Lem's mother (Khandi Alexander), a brilliant scientist who has always intimidated him, visits and begins an affair with Dr. Bhamba. Plus, Ted and Linda try to work together on a sweet-scented lightbulb, but Ted opts for his own longer-lasting bulb.
17	4	"It's Nothing Business, It's Just Personal"	Marc Buckland	Victor Fresco	December 29, 2009	2APX02
When Veronica's magician boyfriend comes to town, she slacks off at work; oddly, Lem is given a red lab coat, while everyone else has a white one.
18	5	"The Great Repression"	Reginald Hudlin	Becky Mann & Audra Sielaff	January 1, 2010	2APX08
A misunderstanding leads Sheila to falsely accuse Ted and Linda of sexual harassment. Veronica responds by convincing the company that sexual harassment attitudes are a disease and those doing so aren't responsible for their actions.
19	6	"Beating a Dead Workforce"	Marc Buckland	Ingrid Escajeda	January 5, 2010	2APX09
When an employee drops dead, Veronica tries to use his example to inspire the other employees to work harder.
20	7	"Change We Can't Believe In"	Lee Shallat-Chemel	Elijah Aron & Jordan Young	January 5, 2010	2APX07
A security guard insists on being Ted's best friend, while Phil and Lem have to work on a project alone with Veronica.
21	8	"The Impertence of Communicationizing"	Michael Fresco	Michael Teverbaugh	January 12, 2010	2APX03
Due to a typo, a memo from Veridian to its employees inadvertently tells them that it is mandatory to use offensive language in the workplace.
22	9	"The Long and Winding High Road"	Michael Spiller	Michael A. Ross	January 12, 2010	2APX01
Ted takes on a rival executive and refuses to compromise his principles. Veronica has no such scruples.
23	10	"Lust in Translation"	Lee Shallat-Chemel	Michael Shipley	January 19, 2010	2APX12
Ted uses a Veridian translator to strike up a romantic relationship with a German executive.
24	11	"Mess of a Salesman"	Marc Buckland	Tim Doyle	January 26, 2010	2APX13
Ted convinces a Veridian supplier to hire his brother (Eddie McClintock) as a salesman. Meanwhile, Veronica receives an award from a charity for young girls.
25	12	"It's My Party and I'll Lie If I Want To"	Michael Spiller	Mike Teverbaugh	August 17, 2010 (Network Ten); Unaired (ABC)	2APX11
Veronica is suspicious that Ted might be using his daughter to bond with the boss in an effort to advance his career. Meanwhile, Phil and Lem tentatively start a friendship with Linda.
26	13	"Swag the Dog"	Lee Shallat-Chemel	Michael A. Ross	August 24, 2010 (Network Ten); Unaired (ABC)	2APX10
Phil and Lem embark on a quest to gain respect around the office, Veronica goes on a reluctant treasure hunt inside the Veridian building, and Ted has to confront rumors of staff favoritism. Cast member Malcolm Barrett's rap recording "Revenge of the Nerds" is heard during the episode.

== Cast ==
- Jay Harrington as Theodore Margaret "Ted" Crisp: Ted is the titular character, and also the show's narrator. He is the senior vice-president of the Research and Development department at Veridian Dynamics, and is well respected and loved by most of the employees – and even members of the otherwise difficult upper management. He balances his desire to maintain his position at the company with his feeling that he must demonstrate a moral center to his daughter. He has had sexual relations with his immediate supervisor, although she remains emotionally distant. He also has interest in Linda, who was a new hire to Veridian Dynamics at the launch of the series.
- Portia de Rossi as Veronica Palmer: Veronica is Ted's boss and immediate supervisor at Veridian Dynamics. She maintains a fierce and unapproachable workplace demeanor, and many employees have a deep fear of her. She seems cold and calculating, but it is also clear that she has more than grudging respect for Ted, and often recognizes what moral action is necessary to maintain balance in the workplace. An ongoing subplot touched on sporadically in the first season but more frequently in the second sees Veronica becoming a mentor to Linda and, to a lesser degree, Rose.
- Andrea Anders as Linda Katherine Zwordling: Linda is a tester in one of Veridian's departments. She finds herself very attracted to Ted, but maintains other relationships and reminds Ted repeatedly that he has rejected the idea of a workplace romance with her. She seems to be a bit of an outsider to the corporate culture. Often she demands that Ted consider the horrible ramifications of the company policies or activities. Her relationship with the scientists is strained by her rejection of the weird things they do in the name of science. Despite this, she finds herself increasingly looking at Veronica as a mentor as the series progresses.
- Jonathan Slavin as Dr. Philip "Phil" Myman: Phil is one of the laboratory scientists in Veridian's Research Department. He is usually working or hanging out with Lem, who works with him on almost every project. He generally does whatever he can to be accepted and avoid conflicts. He is married, and makes frequent references to his wife, who seems to hate him. In season 2's episode 6, "Beating a Dead Workforce", we learn she was a member of Mossad.
- Malcolm Barrett as Dr. Lem Hewitt: Lem is one of the laboratory scientists in Veridian's Research Department. He is best friends with his lab partner Phil, who works with him on almost every project. Lem is just as conflict-averse as Phil, and seems just as willing to roll over and take whatever abuse the company has to offer. He grew up in the shadow of his mother (Khandi Alexander) a renowned scientist.
- Isabella Acres as Rose Crisp: Rose is Ted's daughter. She attends the Veridian Dynamics daycare program when her nanny is not available, but prefers to stay at home. According to Ted, "her mom ran off to Africa to go save the world." She is often the voice of reason on the show. When Ted talks with her about work she points out the terrible choices the company makes, and often helps Ted focus on what needs to be done to set things straight. She attends Eugene Debs Elementary School. In season 2, she tells Veronica that she's 8 years old.

== Production ==
=== Origin ===
Victor Fresco, the show's creator, has cited his being a new parent as inspiration for the show. In an interview with NPR, he discussed how having a kid piqued his interest to develop a show about the disconnection between a person's public and personal lives, such as how parents teach their kids to be moral, yet work for giant corporations. According to Fresco, Ted Crisp is the single father and his daughter serves as his moral compass. Fresco stated that since he's worked for a few giant companies, he didn't base Veridian Dynamics on any specific corporation. The show's name was based on the idea that a person is better off if they are Ted, that essentially the average person wants to be Ted. Fresco has stated that he wasn't a fan of the show's title, but hadn't spoken of changing it.

=== Casting ===
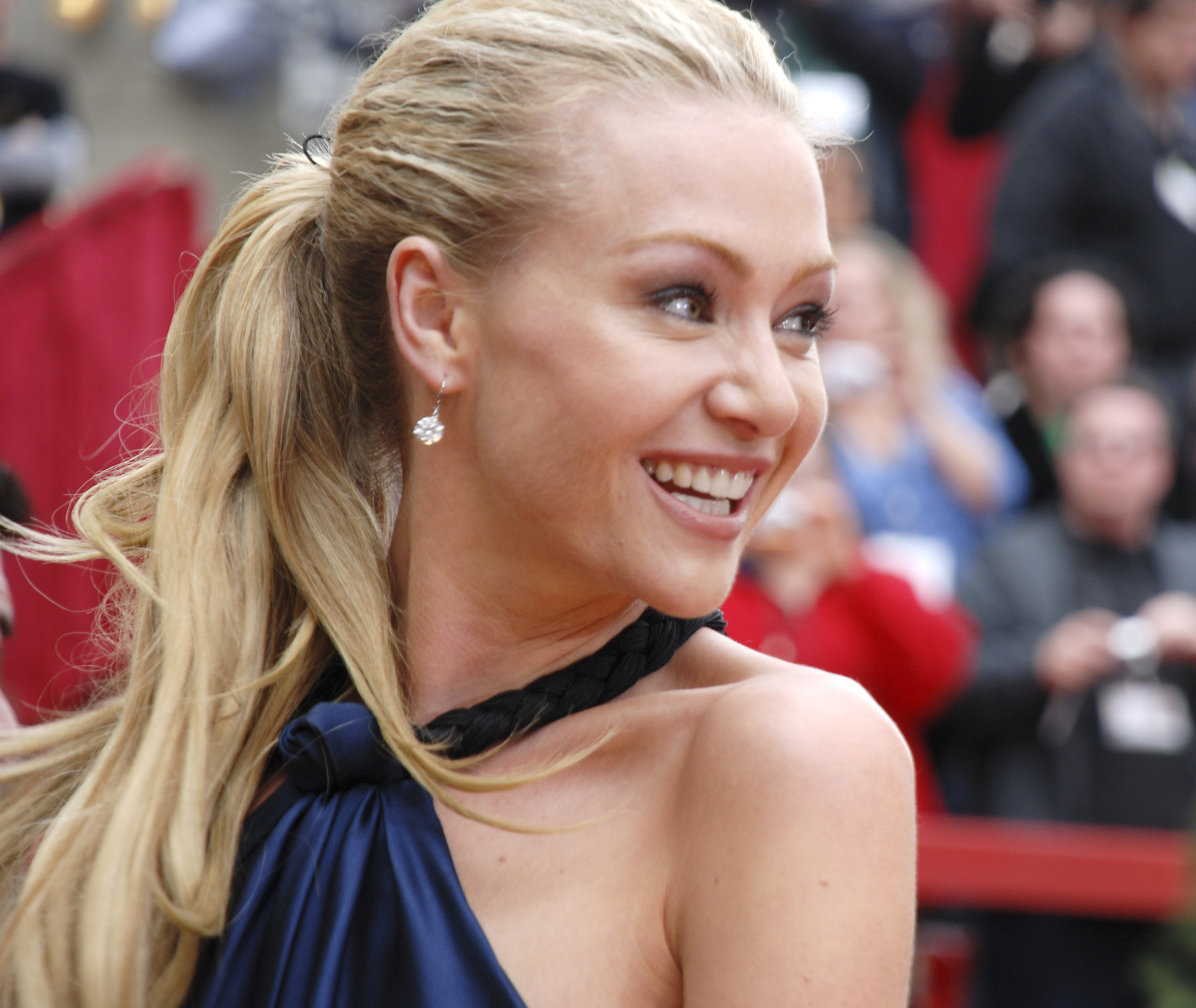
Fresco was convinced Portia de Rossi (pictured) was perfect for the role of Veronica.

In casting his crew, Fresco and his team worked fairly quickly. "You don't have a lot of time to cast, unfortunately, and it's the most important thing in the show, I think." says Fresco, "Good casting can transcend mediocre material but the best material in the world cannot transcend the mediocre casting. It's all about casting and I think we got really lucky in all five of these regulars."

Fresco approached Jonathan Slavin, with whom he had previously worked on the sitcom Andy Richter Controls the Universe, about playing the role of Phil. Being a fan of Slavin's work, he thought he'd be great for the role. Andrea Anders, whom Fresco previously enjoyed on The Class, and Malcolm Barrett were cast for the roles of Linda and Lem respectively. Portia de Rossi met with Fresco about the role of Veronica. Fresco assessed during their meeting that de Rossi was completely convinced that the role was perfect for her and that she was born to play it. He thought de Rossi nailed the role and cast her. When asked what drew her to the role, de Rossi replied, "I'm really attracted to strong women." De Rossi further went on to say, "I kind of had to throw myself at [Fresco]. I told him I'd played this character who had similar qualities, very work driven, strong, insensitive, slightly chilly. I had to convince him I could play this character well and could play a character of this nature." Jay Harrington was the first person Fresco met with when trying to cast someone as Ted Crisp. Although Fresco really liked Harrington, he decided to see more people before casting the role. After five weeks, Harrington was cast.

=== Cancellation ===
The series was officially canceled by ABC on May 13, 2010. In an interview with New York Magazine, Victor Fresco, the show's creator, was asked why he thought the show didn't catch on. He responded, "I think not enough people knew about it. It wasn’t like we had a lot of people watch it and they didn’t come back to it. If anything, I think we were building slowly, but to me the way TV works is you spend a lot of money advertising and promoting, or you have to let a show stay some place for a long period of time and an audience slowly comes to it. And I don’t think we got either of that". Fresco also added, "I still feel there’s an audience out there for it, because I know that the people who liked it, liked it a lot."

At the time of its cancellation, two episodes of Better Off Ted had yet to be broadcast by ABC. The network announced on May 27, 2010, that it would air the two episodes back-to-back on June 17, 2010, contingent on the 2010 NBA Finals not requiring a seventh game. Ultimately a seventh game was needed, and thus ABC did not air the final two episodes of the series.

== DVD release ==
Better Off Ted: The Complete First Season
Set details: 13 episodes; 2 disc set		Features: Anamorphic widescreen (1.78:1 aspect ratio); 5.1 Dolby Digital Surround; Language: English and Spanish; Subtitles: English, French, and Spanish	
Release dates:	Region 1	Region 2	Region 4
Release dates:	December 1, 2009		2011

Better Off Ted: The Complete Second Season
Set details: 13 episodes; 2 disc set		Features: Multiple Formats; AC-3; Color; Dolby; DTS Surround Sound; Widescreen; NTSC	
Release dates:	Region 1	Region 2	Region 4
Release dates:	November 25, 2014		

== Reception ==
=== Critical response ===
Critics have praised Better Off Ted's witty and satirical humour, as well as its cast. According to Metacritic, which assigns a rating out of 100 to reviews from mainstream critics, the show's first season holds a score of 68 out of 100, indicating "generally favorable reviews", based on 21 reviews. Misha Davenport of the Chicago Sun-Times wrote favorably of the show, comparing its characters to those of the highly acclaimed show Arrested Development. Linda Stasi of the New York Post gave the show three-and-a-half out of four stars, lauding the cast and simply referring to it as "a very funny comedy". Ken Tucker of Entertainment Weekly gave the show a B+, stating "'Better Off Ted' is certainly the most original sitcom to come along in a while." Robert Bianco from USA Today referred to the show as "well-cast and reasonably entertaining."

After returning for a second season, the show became even more acclaimed and is considered by some critics to be a vast improvement on its first. On Metacritic, it holds a score of 84 out of 100, indicating "universal acclaim", based on 11 reviews. Linda Stasi of the New York Post gave the show's second season a perfect score, calling it "hilarious and even funnier this year than last." Tim Goodman of the San Francisco Chronicle also gave the show's second season a perfect score, praising the show's return, saying it "means there's finally something good (and funny) on Tuesday nights." Ken Tucker of Entertainment Weekly gave the show's return an A−, stating "Thank goodness Better Off Ted has returned intact. I love everything about this show, from star Jay Harrington's delivery of Ted's straight-man lines with WASP ramrod posture to the show's up-front critiques of corporate capitalism."

=== Ratings ===
The show's pilot episode averaged a total of 5.64 million viewers, which made it ABC's lowest-rated comedy debut since 2005. The show's first season continued to experience both a drop and mild fluctuation in ratings, taking in only 2.41 million for its finale. After being renewed, the show's second season premiered to a low 3.82 million viewers.

Episode Number	Season	Episode	Rating	18–49 Rating	Viewers (millions)
1	1	"Pilot"	3.6	2.2/6	5.64
2	1	"Heroes"	3.0	1.8/5	4.69
3	1	"Through Rose-colored HAZMAT Suits"	3.1	1.8/5	4.71
4	1	"Racial Sensitivity"	2.7	1.7/5	4.21
5	1	"Win Some, Dose Some"	2.9	1.9/6	4.72
6	1	"Goodbye, Mr. Chips"	2.7	1.7/5	4.20
7	1	"Get Happy"	2.1	1.2/3	3.22
8	1	"You Are the Boss of Me"	1.3	0.8/2	1.87
9	1	"Bioshuffle"	1.2	0.6/2	1.78
10	1	"Trust and Consequence"	1.7	1.0/3	2.57
11	1	"Father, Can You Hair Me?"	1.4	0.7/2	1.87
12	1	"Jabberwocky"	1.7	0.9/3	2.75
13	1	"Secrets and Lives"	1.7	0.9/3	2.41
14	2	"Love Blurts"	2.5	1.5/4	3.82
15	2	"The Lawyer, The Lemur and the Little Listener"	2.1	1.3/3	3.18
16	2	"Battle of the Bulbs"	1.9	1.0/3	2.88
17	2	"It's Nothing Business, It's Just Personal"	1.7	1.0/3	2.69
18	2	"The Great Repression"	3.4	1.7/5	5.62
19	2	"Beating a Dead Workforce"	1.9	1.3/3	2.99
20	2	"Change We Can't Believe In"	1.7	1.1/3	2.60
21	2	"The Impertence of Communicationizing"	1.4	0.8/2	2.23
22	2	"The Long and Winding High Road"	1.8	1.0/2	2.53
23	2	"Lust in Translation"	2.1	1.3/3	3.24
24	2	"Mess of a Salesman"	1.7	1.0/2	2.55
25	2	"It's My Party, and I'll Lie if I Want To"			
26	2	"Swag the Dog"			

=== Awards and accolades ===
On TV.com, editorial assistant Anna Hiatt included the show in the website's list of The Best TV Shows of 2009. Josh Bell, a writer from About.com, ranked the series second on his list of The Best TV Comedies of 2010. In 2009, the show was nominated for an EWwy Award for Best Comedy Series.

== Reunions ==
In mid-2011 series co-star Malcolm Barrett released his first single, "Revenge of the Nerds" under his alternate performance name, Verbal. The official music video for the song, released in June 2011, reunited all the major cast members of Better Off Ted, although only Barrett, Slavin and de Rossi reprised their original series characters (Harrington and Anders appear as a high school jock and a cheerleader, respectively, while series creator Victor Fresco also appears in the video). Barrett's recording is also included on the soundtrack of the final episode of Better Off Ted, "Swag the Dog."

In 2020, the cast virtually reunited for a table read of an episode and moderated discussion to raise money for Feeding America.
