= Home Front (play) =

Home Front is a play by Warren Leight. It tells the story of an interracial couple, Annie and James, who meet while celebrating V-J Day, and was inspired by the famous photo of a kiss in Times Square. The story showcases the daily life of the couple in New York City and the deep South, where James is stationed awaiting his final release.

== Production history ==
The character of James was inspired by the men of the Golden 13 and Eddie, the neighbor, by Leight's uncle.

The show, whose first scene was written as part of a benefit event in 1998 and had an original run under the name James and Annie in 2003, had readings in 2011 and 2018 before a Twitter inquiry brought fresh eyes to it.

It made its West Coast premiere in January 2023 at the Victory Theater Center in Burbank, California, with Austin Highsmith Garces as Annie, C.J. Lindsey as James and Jonathan Slavin as their gay neighbor. The show's set design was by Evan Bartoletti, sound design by Noah Andrade, and costume design by Carin Jacobs. The run was extended through February 26, 2023.
