= The Last Run (2004 film) =

- Directed by: Jonathan Segal
- Written by: Todd Camhe; Jonathan Segal
- Produced by: Todd Camhe; Jonathan Segal
- Starring: Fred Savage; Amy Adams; Steven Pasquale; Andrea Bogart; Erinn Bartlett; Vyto Ruginis; Robert Romanus; Ray Baker; Abby Brammell; Amanda Swisten; Lisa Arturo; Jillian Bach; Ina Barrón
- Cinematography: Donald M. Morgan; Joaquin Sedillo
- Edited by: Matt Friedman
- Music by: Laura Karpman
- Production companies: Run it Raw, Inc.
- Release date: 2004
- Running time: 101 min.
- Country: United States
- Language: English

The Last Run is a 2004 American comedy-drama/erotic thriller film directed by Jonathan Segal.

== Plot ==
An accountant finds out that his girlfriend is cheating him. He goes on a "run" to sleep with as many women as he can to get over his heartbreak after his best friend advises him to do so.

== Cast ==
- Fred Savage
- Amy Adams
- Steven Pasquale
- Andrea Bogart
- Erinn Bartlett
- Vyto Ruginis
- Robert Romanus
- Ray Baker
- Abby Brammell
- Amanda Swisten
- Lisa Arturo
- Jillian Bach
- Ina Barrón
- Angela Sarafyan
- Robert Peters

== Production ==
The film music was composed by Laura Karpman.
