= École supérieure de ballet du Québec =

Dance school in Montreal, Canada

Coordinates: 45.5262°N 73.5869°W

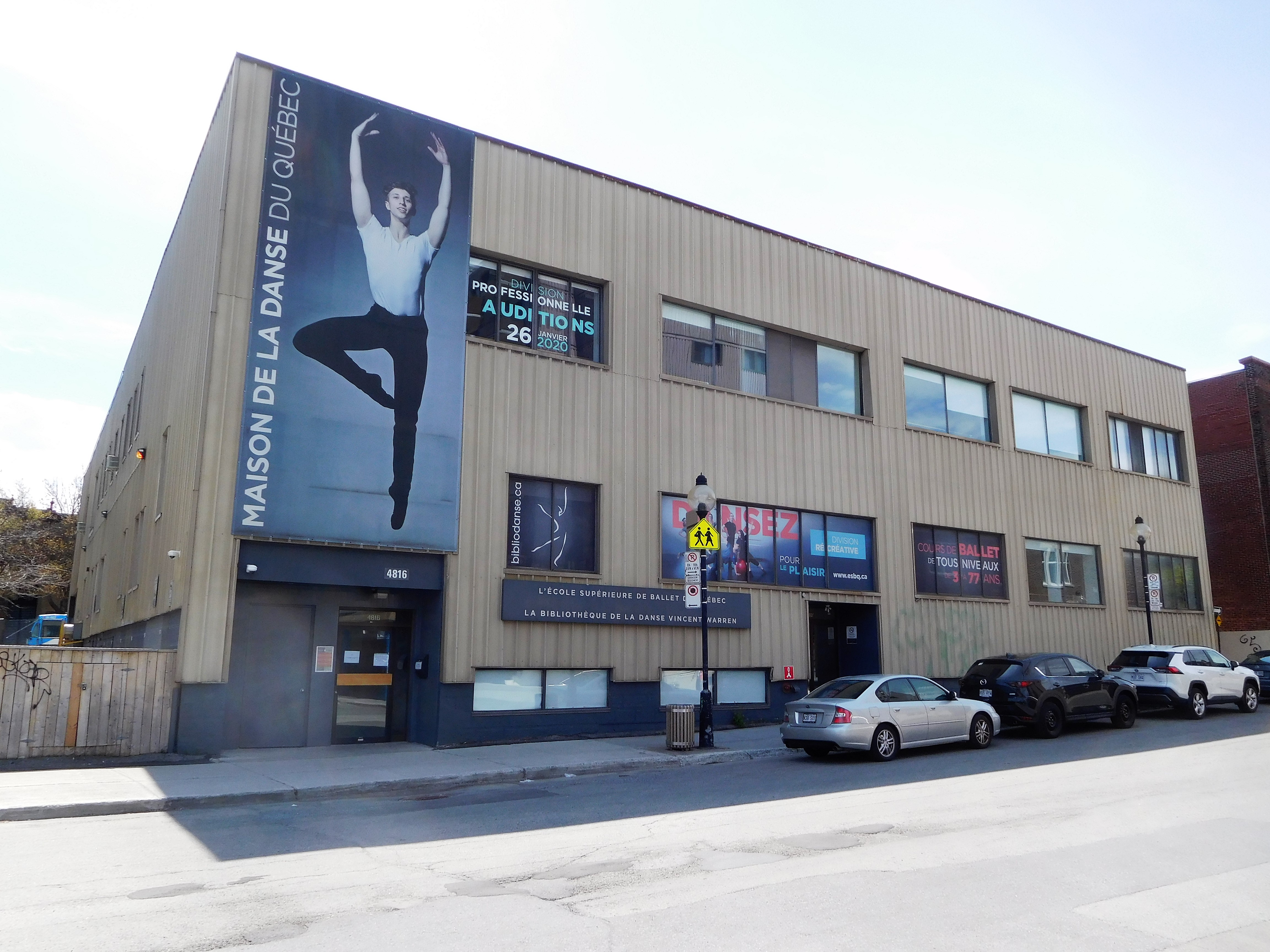
4816 Rivard Street, Montreal

The École supérieure de ballet de Montréal (ESBQ) is a professional dance training school in Montreal, Quebec, Canada which is part of the Maison de la danse Ludmilla Chiriaeff, a building that it has owned since 1982 and which is also home to the dance company Les Grands Ballets Canadiens de Montréal.

The school is located in central Montreal in the Plateau-Mont-Royal borough, a few yards from the Laurier subway station. It is the only institution in Quebec to offer a complete professional training program in classical ballet. Montreal is home to more than 30 professional dance companies, with more than 200 dance performances presented every year in some 20 different theatres and performance spaces.

== History ==
Since 2010, the ESBCM is directed by Anik Bissonnette, whose professional credits include being principal dancer with Les Grands Ballets Canadiens many years. In 2011, the school was renamed L'École supérieure de ballet du Québec to reflect its role in dance development in Quebec.

== Dance program ==
The school's dance-study program is recognized by the Quebec Ministry of Education and subsidized by both the Ministry of Culture and Communications and the Department of Canadian Heritage. It offers a full 12-year program from the primary school level up to a high school and college diploma. Students are accepted following an audition, and take academic classes at partner institutions: École Saint-Joseph (grade school), Pensionnat du Saint-Nom-de-Marie (high school), and Cégep du Vieux-Montréal (college). Students from outside Montreal can board with local families or at the Pensionnat du Saint-Nom-de-Marie student residence. Primary and secondary school students are transported from their academic institution by school bus to the Maison de la danse Ludmilla Chiriaeff. Students take classes in classical dance, pointe work, folklore, suppleness and flexibility, physical conditioning, choreography, career management and dance history, and also attend workshops on health and nutrition. At the end of each year students must pass an exam where they are evaluated by a jury of professional dance artists. They also present a public performance of classical ballet and contemporary dance, usually at the end of the school year.

== Jeune Ballet du Québec ==
Established in 1980, the Jeune Ballet du Québec is an apprenticeship troupe that introduces freshly graduated students to the world of professional dance. Since 1997 this young company features new dance work, and tours regularly. The Jeune Ballet du Québec commissions works by several contemporary choreographers, demonstrating that a dancer with classical training is able to perform any style of dance.
