= Isabella Acres =

American actress

- Born: February 21; Atlanta, Georgia, U.S.
- Occupation: Actress
- Years active: 2006–present

External image
- Acres in 2019.

Isabella Acres (born February 21) is an American actress who played Rose on Better Off Ted, Katie on Phineas and Ferb, and Mirabelle Harris in The Kicks.

== Early life ==
Acres was born in Atlanta, Georgia, where she discovered her love for acting in children's theater.

Acres is best known for her series regular role as Rose Crisp on Better Off Ted, the seven-year-old daughter of Ted (Jay Harrington) who is often the most mature person at his home and workplace. The show ran for two seasons from 2009 to 2010.

== Appearances ==
Acres also appeared on an episode of Monk in 2007, and single episodes of The Mentalist where she plays Patrick Jane's (Simon Baker) daughter and on the hit television show Hannah Montana. Acres was nominated for Best Performance in a TV Series, Guest Starring Young Actress at the Young Artist Awards 2009 for her performance in The Mentalist.

She had a recurring role of Soleil Friedman in the second season of the Fox television series Touch.

In 2016, she played Mirabelle Harris in the Amazon Studios television series The Kicks.

== Filmography ==
=== Television ===
Year	Series	Role	Episode/Notes
2007	Monk	Other Child	Episode: "Mr. Monk and the Man Who Shot Santa Claus"
2008	The Mentalist	Charlotte Jane	Episode: "Redwood"
2008	Hannah Montana	Little Girl	Episode: "Killing Me Softly with His Height"
2009–10	Better Off Ted	Rose Crisp	Recurring role
2009–15, 2025	Phineas and Ferb	Katie	Voice role; 7 episodes
2010–12	Scooby-Doo! Mystery Incorporated	Mary Anne Gleardan	Voice role; 2 episodes
2011	Desperate Housewives	Jenny Hunter-McDermott	3 episodes
2011	The Middle	Autumn Wagner	Episode: "Valentine's Day II"
2011	Adventure Time	Young Princess Bubblegum, Erin	Voice role; 4 episodes
2011	The Event	Mary "The Little Girl"	Episode: "The Beginning of the End"
2011	Beyond the Blackboard	Dana	Television movie
2013	Touch	Soleil Friedman	Recurring role (season 2)
2014	The Spoils of Babylon	Young Cynthia Morehouse	Television miniseries
2016	The Kicks	Mirabelle Harris	Season 1
2013–18	Sofia the First	Jade	Recurring voice role
2026	Sofia the First: Royal Magic	Jade	Recurring voice role

=== Film ===
Year	Film	Role	Notes
2006	Air Buddies	Rosebud Sound Alike	DVD Special Features
2007	30 Days of Night	Little Vampire Girl	ADR voice role
2007	Fred Claus	Little Girl	ADR voice role
2007	Life with Fiona	Dancing Girl	
2010	Free Willy: Escape from Pirate's Cove	Kirra Cooper Sound Alike	
2010	The Future	Gabriella	
2012	A Monster Christmas	Lilly	Voice role
2013	Scooby-Doo! Stage Fright	Emma Gale	Voice role
2014	Home	Girl	
2015	Hello, My Name Is Doris	Vivian	
2017	The Meanest Man in Texas	Ruthie Welsey	

=== Video games ===
Year	Title	Voice role	Notes
2011	Resistance: Burning Skies	Rachel	
