= Melissa Schroeder =

American writer of romance fiction

- Born: United States
- Occupation: Writer
- Writing career
- Pen name: Kiera West
- Period: 2004–present
- Genres: Romance – historical, erotic, contemporary, paranormal, futuristic
- Notable awards: The Hired Hand 2005 Eppie Finalist for Contemporary Romance Tempting Prudence, a 2005 CAPA finalist for short erotic romance
- Website: melissaschroeder.net

Melissa Schroeder is an American writer of romance fiction. She has been published since 2004. Her publishers include Samhain Publishing, Siren Publishing, Ellora's Cave, Liquid Silver Books and Whiskey Creek Press. She has also self-published works. She made the USA Today Bestseller list in September 2013 with her book, The Santinis Collection and again in November 2013 with Uniform Desires.

Schroeder writes in various genres of romance including contemporary, historical, paranormal, romantic comedy, futuristic action adventure and erotic fiction.

== Bibliography ==
=== Series ===
==== Harmless series ====
- A Little Harmless Sex (Feb 2007)
- A Little Harmless Pleasure (Feb 2008)
- A Little Harmless Obsession (Sep 2010)
- A Little Harmless Lie (Dec 2010)
- A Little Harmless Addiction (Mar 2011)
- A Little Harmless Surprise (May 2011) Novella, Bonus Material A Little Harmless Fling & A Little Harmless Kalikimaka
- A Little Harmless Submission (Oct 2011)
- A Little Harmless Gift (Dec 2011) Novella
- A Little Harmless Fascination (Apr 2012)
- A Little Harmless Fantasy(Jan 2013)
- A Little Harmless Ride(July 2013)

==== Military Harmless series ====
- Infatuation (Nov 2011)
- Possession (May 2012)
- Surrender (July 2012)

==== The Santinis ====
- Leonardo (May 2013)
- Marco (May 2013)
- Gianni (May 2013)
- Vicente (May 2013)
- The Santinis Collection (Aug 2013)
- A Santini Christmas (Nov 2013)

==== Semper Fi Marines ====
- Tease Me (Sept 2013)
- Tempt Me (scheduled May 2014)
- Touch Me (schedule July 2014)

==== The Cursed Clan ====
- Callum (Jan 2012)
- Angus ( scheduled April 2014)

==== Once Upon and Accident ====
- The Accidental Countess (May 2007)
- Lessons in Seduction (Aug 2007)
- The Spy Who Loved Her (Mar 2011)

==== Hawaiian Holidays ====
- Mele Kalikimaka, Baby (Dec 2010)
- Sex on the Beach (Dec 2010)
- Getting Lei'd (Dec 2011)

==== Bounty Hunters, Inc. ====
- For Love or Honor (Sep 2011)
- Sinner's Delight (Oct 2011)

==== Texas Temptations ====
- Conquering India (Mar 2010)
- Delilah's Downfall (Nov 2010)

==== Sweet Shoppe ====
- Turning Paige (Jun 2009)

==== Saints and Sinners ====
- Seducing the Saint (Mar 2008)
- Hunting Mila (Sep 2008)

=== Connected stories ===
==== Connected ====
- A Calculated Seduction (Dec 2004)
- Going for Eight (Future Release)

==== Connected ====
- The Hired Hand (Sep 2004)
- Hands on Training (Apr 2005)

=== Stand Alone ===
- Grace Under Pressure (Nov 2006)
- Telepathic Cravings (Feb 2009)
- Her Mother's Killer (May 2009)
- The Last Detail (Sep 2011)

=== Part of Anthologies ===
- The Zodiac Series: Cancer (Jun 2005)
- Operation: L.O.V.E Anthology (Jul 2005)
- The Seduction of Widow McEwan (Nov 2007) Leather and Lace Anthology

=== Writing as Kiera West ===
This is a serialized imprint at Siren Publishing.

- Seducing Their Mate (Feb 2011)
- The Alpha's Fall (Mar 2011)
- Convincing Ethan (Jun 2011)
- Shane's Need (Sep 2011)
- Rand's Craving (Dec 2011)
- Jason's Salvation (Future Release)
- Max's Hunger (Future Release)
- Claiming Their Mate (Future Release)
