= Jonathan Segal (director) =

American film director

Jonathan Segal is a film director and producer, known for The Last Run (2004), Norman (2010) and Ripple (1995).
