= Stacey Bess =

American author and educator

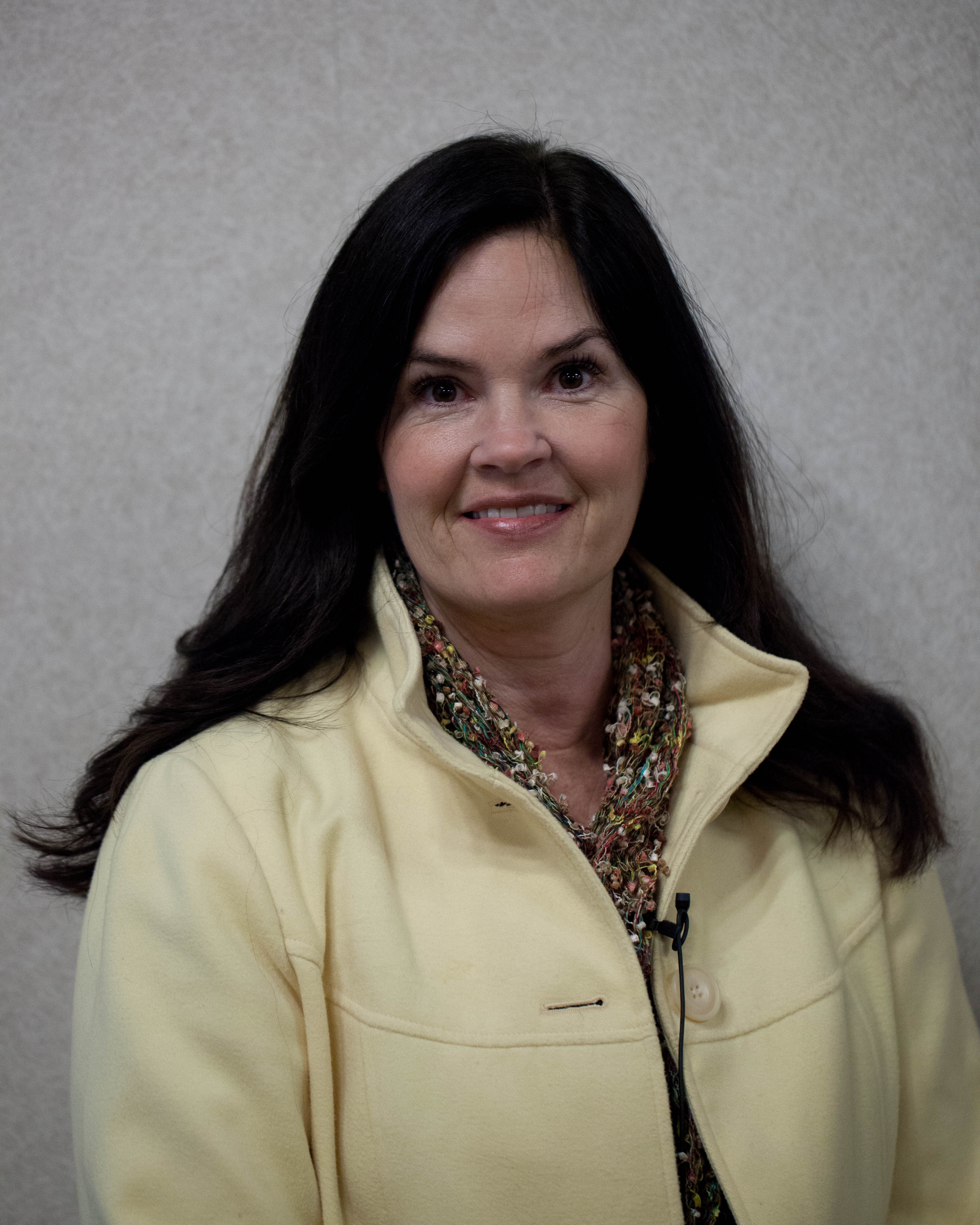
- Born: 16 October 1963 (age 61); Salt Lake City, Utah, U.S.
- Education: University of Utah (BA)
- Occupations: Author; educator

Stacey Bess (born October 16, 1963 in Salt Lake City, Utah) is an American author and educator. She wrote the memoir Nobody Don't Love Nobody, which was made into a Hallmark Hall of Fame movie in 2011 called Beyond the Blackboard.

== Early life ==
Bess was born on October 16, 1963 in Salt Lake City, Utah. Her mother, Susan, was a secretary for a juvenile detention center in Salt Lake City. Her step-father, Roger Coon, was a fundraiser.

Bess attended the University of Utah, graduating with a B.A. in elementary education in 1987.

== Career ==
Bess' first teaching job, the only assignment she could find, was teaching math and reading at a school for children in a homeless shelter in Salt Lake City, Utah. She was told she would teach grades K–6, but she instead had to teach grades K–12. The school was known as "The School With No Name"

She wrote the memoir Nobody Don’t Love Nobody: Lessons on Love From the School With No Name in 1994, about her experiences teaching homeless children at the homeless shelter. In 2011, the book was made into a Hallmark Hall of Fame movie called Beyond the Blackboard. After her book was published, she continued to teach at the homeless shelter part time.

Bess now works as a public speaker, advocating for the educational rights of impoverished children. She also wrote Planting More Than Pansies: A Fable about Love in 2003.

== Awards and honors ==
Her service has been recognized with a number of awards, including the National Jefferson Award for Greatest Public Service by Someone 35 Years or Younger in 1995. She received the Delta Kappa Gamma Educator's Award in 1995 and the Rescuer of Humanity from Project Love in 1996.

== Personal life ==
Bess married Greg Bess, a commercial real estate appraiser in 1980 when she was sixteen and he was seventeen. The couple then went on to finish high school. They have six children. She has had thyroid cancer twice, surviving her first round when she was thirty.
