= Jonathan Slavin =

American actor (born 1969)

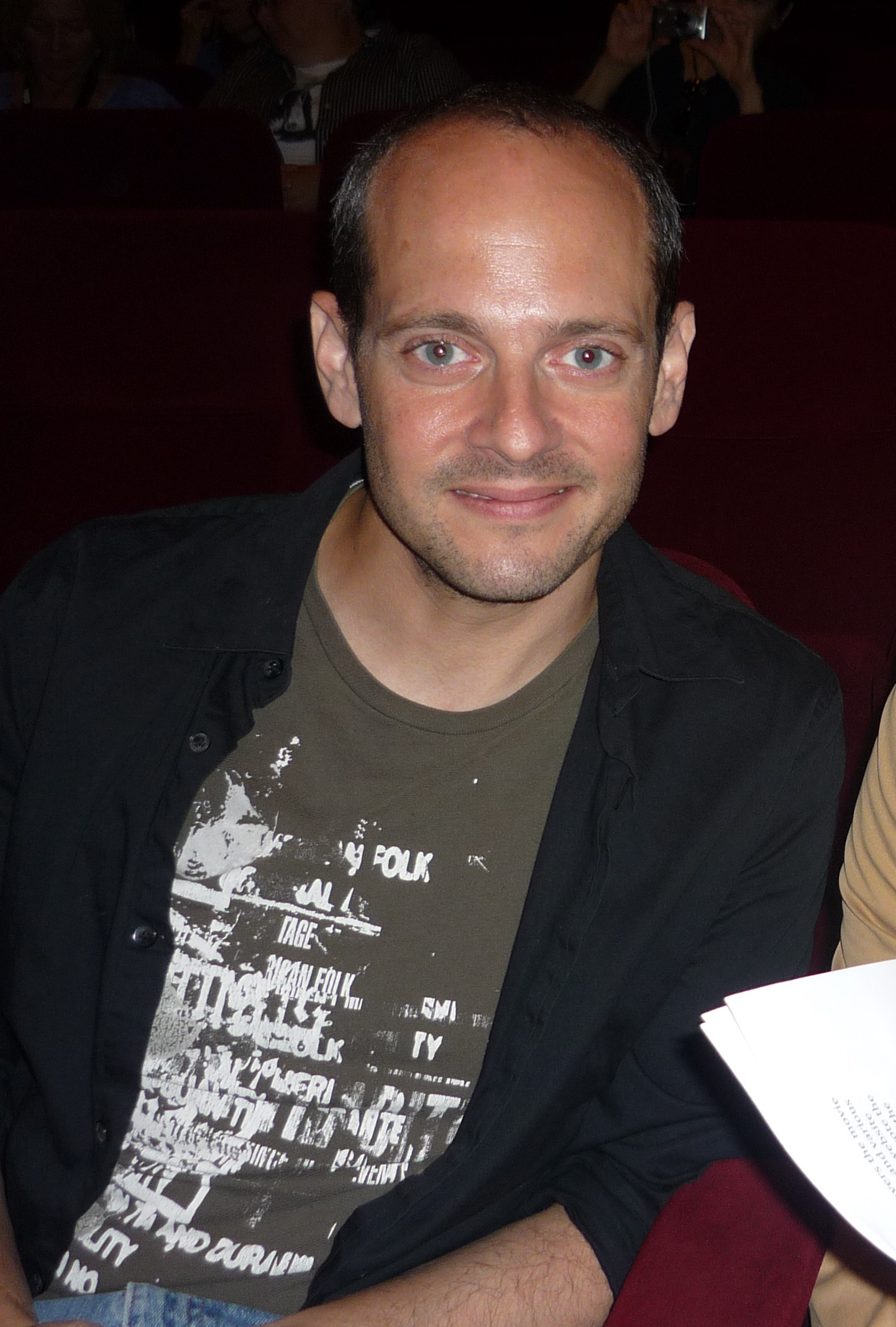
- Slavin in 2010
- Born: November 8, 1969 (age 56); Camp Lejeune, North Carolina, U.S.
- Occupation: Actor
- Years active: 1994–present

Jonathan Slavin (born November 8, 1969) is an American actor.

== Early life ==
Slavin was born in Camp Lejeune, North Carolina and raised in Wilkes-Barre, Pennsylvania.

== Career ==
Slavin portrayed illustrator Byron Togler on the Fox network's sitcom Andy Richter Controls the Universe, Ogo on the CGI animated show Robot and Monster, and scientist Phil Myman on ABC's sitcom Better Off Ted. He appeared as a member the main cast of Dr. Ken and The Republic of Sarah and as a recurring character on Speechless and Santa Clarita Diet.

Slavin has also had guest roles on series such as Dharma & Greg, Castle, Grey's Anatomy, My Name Is Earl, Summerland, Friends, Grimm, Weeds, Wings, ER, Chicago Hope, Ugly Betty, CSI: Crime Scene Investigation, Bones, Better with You, Raising Hope, The Finder, Grace and Frankie and Friends with Better Lives.

He has also appeared in such feature films as Free Enterprise, Race to Witch Mountain, Backwoods, A Cinderella Story, Dirty Girl, and Love & Mercy.

In January 2023, he returned to the stage in Home Front.

== Personal life ==
Slavin is Jewish. He is gay and in July 2016 he married his partner of 22 years. He is also a vegan and animal rights activist, with a large menagerie of adopted pets.
