= Jay Harrington =

American actor (b. 1971)

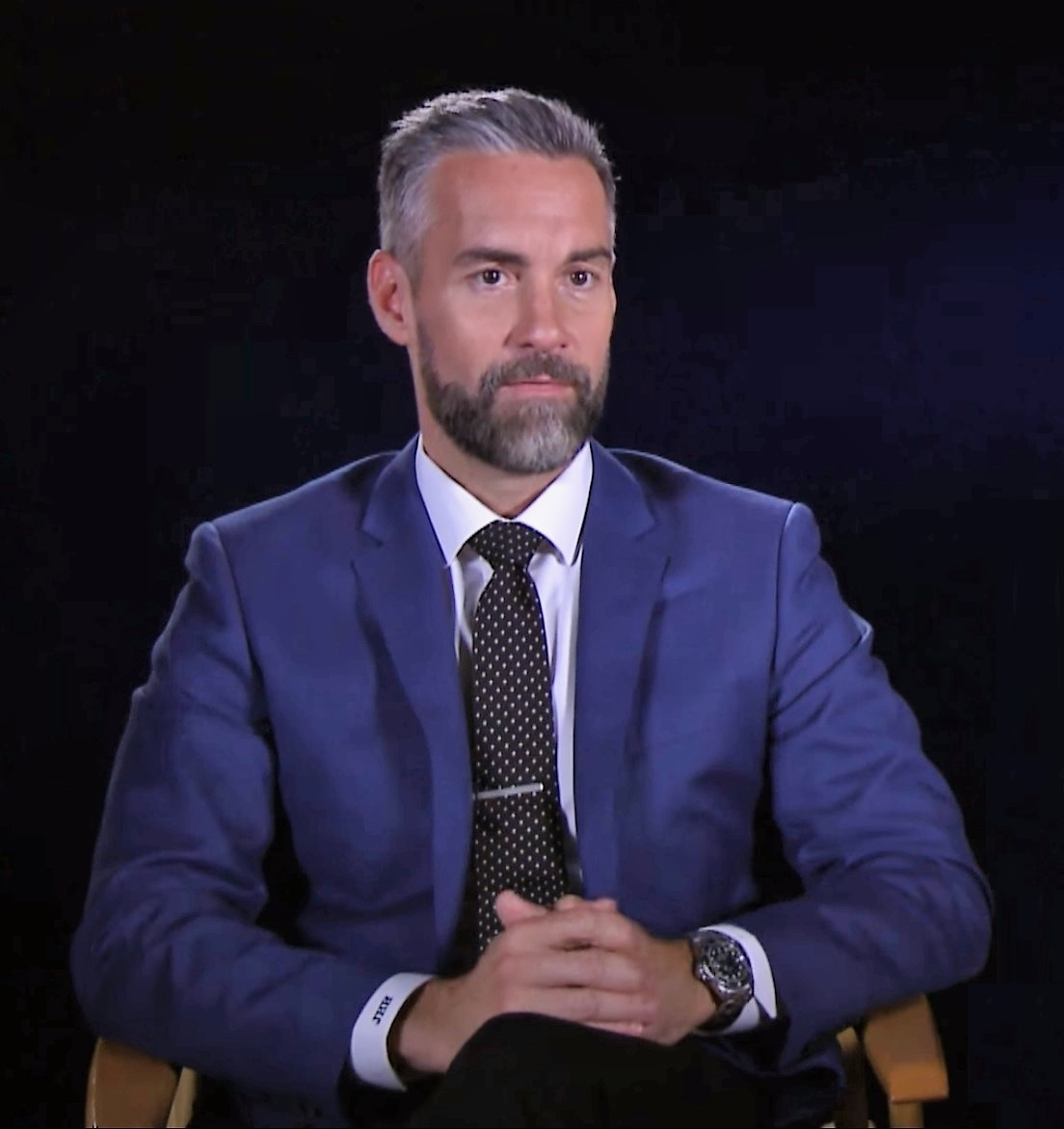
- Harrington discusses S.W.A.T. in 2018
- Born: James H. Harrington III; November 15, 1971 (age 54); Wellesley, Massachusetts, U.S.
- Education: Syracuse University
- Occupations: Actor, director

James H. Harrington III (born November 15, 1971), professionally known as Jay Harrington, is an American actor and director. He is known for his role as the title character in the ABC sitcom Better Off Ted (2009–2010), and as Sgt. David "Deacon" Kay in S.W.A.T. from 2017 to 2025.

== Early life ==
Harrington was born and raised in Wellesley, Massachusetts to Judy and Terry Harrington. He has two brothers, actor Adam and Matt. As a child, his family spent summers on Cape Cod up the road from The Harwich Junior Theater. He attended Wellesley High School and then studied theater at Syracuse University.

== Career ==
Harrington has been featured as Dr. Simon O'Keefe on the WB drama Summerland, FBI Special Agent Paul Ryan on FOX's short-lived The Inside, and Steve on NBC's version of Coupling. He appeared in a recurring role on the police drama series The Division. He has also had roles on A.U.S.A., The Shield, Time of Your Life, Private Practice, and Burn Notice.

In 2006, Harrington began appearing as Dr. Ron McCready on the series Desperate Housewives. He starred as Ted Crisp in the comedy series Better Off Ted from March 2009 to January 2010. He had a recurring role in Season 4 of the TV Land comedy series Hot in Cleveland. In 2014, he co-starred on the short-lived USA Network comedy series Benched. In 2017, he had a guest role on Suits as Mark Meadows, Donna's ex-boyfriend. He starred as Sergeant II David "Deacon" Kay on S.W.A.T., based on the 1975 television series and 2003 movie of the same name, and was a series regular for all eight seasons.

Harrington has appeared in films such as American Reunion (with his character again – like in Desperate Housewives – being called "Dr. Ron"), Whatever It Takes, Anywhere but Here, Catalina Trust, A Little Inside, and Partner(s). He has also performed on stage, starring as Jack in Boy's Life and appearing in the off-Broadway productions Barefoot in the Park and Tony and Tina's Wedding, Harrington is an avid sports fan who plays in the Entertainment League, a private celebrity basketball league (formerly the NBA-E League), and skates for a local amateur ice hockey team.

== Filmography ==
=== Film ===
Year	Title	Role	Notes
1999	Anywhere But Here	Waiter	
1999	A Little Inside	Ryan McGillian	
2000	Whatever It Takes	Cop	
2000	Octopus	Special Agent Roy Turner	
2011	A Monster in Paris	Emile	Voice role
2012	American Reunion	Dr. Ron	
2015	Turkey Hollow	Ron Emmerson	

=== Television ===
Year	Show	Role	Notes
1998	Pacific Blue	Mitch	1 episode
1998	The Pretender	Det. Maxwell	1 episode
1999	Nash Bridges	Scott	Episode: "Gimme Shelter"
2001	Star Trek: Voyager	Ravoc	Episode: "Workforce Part 2"
2002	The Shield	Tom Ross	1 episode
2003	Coupling	Steve Taylor	Main role
2004	Without a Trace	Will Sterling	Episode: "Life Rules"
2004	Las Vegas	Cole Helmsley	1 episode
2004–2005	Summerland	Simon	Recurring role
2005	Ghost Whisperer	Mark	Episode: "Ghost Bride"
2005	The Inside	Paul Ryan	Main role
2005–2006	Desperate Housewives	Dr. Ron McCready	7 episodes
2008–2009	Private Practice	Wyatt Lockhart	5 episodes
2009	Burn Notice	Erik Luna	Episode: "Shot in the Dark"
2009–2010	Better Off Ted	Ted	Main role
2012–2014	Hot in Cleveland	Alec	Recurring role
2014	Benched	Phil Quinlan	Main role
2016	Code Black	Dr. Leo Fields	3 episodes
2017	Suits	Mark Meadows	Recurring role (season 7)
2017–2025	S.W.A.T.	Sergeant II David "Deacon" Kay	Main role
2026	S.W.A.T. Exiles	Sergeant II David "Deacon" Kay	1 episode

=== Director ===
Year	Show	Notes
2023–2025	S.W.A.T.	Episodes: "All That Glitters", "Allegiance", "Open Season"
