= James C. Roberts =

American businessman (born 1946)

James Cleveland Roberts (born August 9, 1946) is the President of the American Studies Center, a non-profit foundation founded in 1978 and currently headquartered in Arlington, Virginia.

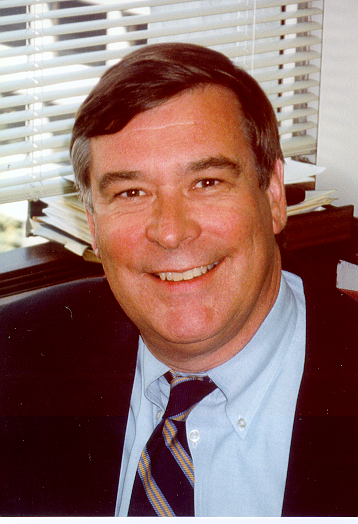
James C. Roberts

In 1985, Roberts founded Radio America, a news/talk network that now has more than 700 affiliates nationwide and more than 7 million listeners.

In 1995, Roberts founded the American Veterans Center, an organization "honoring the sacrifice and guarding the legacy of America’s veterans." The AVC supports a wide range of programs including organizing the National Memorial Day Parade in Washington, DC, a national conference, several educational efforts and an oral history program and a quarterly publication, American Valor Quarterly.

== Family ==
Roberts was born on August 9, 1946, in Chicago, Illinois, the son of William H.T. Roberts and Marjorie Cox Roberts. In 1948, the family moved to Summitville, Ohio. Roberts graduated from Mt. Hermon School for Boys in 1964 and then attended Miami University, graduating in 1968.

Roberts and his wife, Patricia (O’Connor) Roberts currently have four children and five grandchildren. They reside in Great Falls, Virginia.

== College ==
While at Miami, Roberts was a member of Sigma Nu fraternity and the Naval ROTC program. He founded a campus magazine, On the Right, was a columnist for the student newspaper and vice president of the college Young Republicans program. He was also the recipient of the LBJ Congressional Internship in 1967.

== Military ==
Following his graduation from Miami, Roberts served in the U.S. Navy for three years as anti-submarine warfare and nuclear weapons officer on the destroyer USS Henderson, home ported in Long Beach, California. The ship made two extended deployments to the Western Pacific in 1969-1970 and 1971-72.

During his tour of duty in the Navy, Roberts received several awards including the Navy Achievement Medal and letters of commendations from the commanding officer, USS Henderson and the commanders of Destroyer Squadron 19 and the United States Seventh Fleet.

== Early career ==
Following his discharge from the U.S. Navy, Roberts worked from 1972 to 1973 as a journalist in Mexico, writing for the “Mexico City News” and the financial magazine “Expansion.”

In January 1974, Roberts assumed the position of political director of the American Conservative Union, based in Washington, DC. From 1975 to 1977 he served as the ACU’s executive director. During his time at ACU Roberts organized the founding of the American Legislative Exchange Council (ALEC) an organization that currently counts state legislators as members. He also helped organized the first Conservative Political Action Conference (CPAC) in 1974. More than 40 years later CPAC continues to be the preeminent conservative event in the nation.

In 1978, Roberts founded James C. Roberts and Associates a public relations and public policy firm while he researched and wrote The Conservative Decade: Emerging Leaders of the 1980s. The book was published in May 1980 with a foreword by former Governor Ronald Reagan.

In February 1981, Roberts was appointed director of the President’s Commission on White House Fellowships, a position which he held until June 1984 at which time he was named director of the Campaign for Prosperity Political Action Committee, headed by Congressman Jack Kemp. The next year he headed Rep. Kemp’s foundation, the Fund for an American Renaissance.

== Later career ==
In 1985 Roberts founded Radio America, a news/talk network that now has more than 700 affiliates nationwide and more than 7 million listeners.

In 1995, Roberts founded the American Veterans Center, an organization “honoring the sacrifice and guarding the legacy of America’s veterans.” The AVC supports a wide range of programs including organizing the National Memorial Day Parade in Washington, DC, a national conference, several educational efforts and an oral history program and a quarterly publication, American Valor Quarterly.

== Books and articles ==
Roberts has written two books: The Conservative Decade, and Hardball on the Hill: Baseball Stories from the Nation’s Capital. He has also edited two books and authored several monographs. His articles have appeared in numerous publications including The New York Times, The Wall Street Journal, The Washington Times, The Washington Post, the Los Angeles Times, Human Events, National Review, ESPN, and Naval History.

== Major awards recognizing the work of Radio America ==
- New York International Radio Festival Gold Medal
- New York International Radio Festival Silver Medal
- New York International Radio Festival World Medal
- Freedom's Foundation Valley Forge Award
- Gabriel Award
- American Bar Association Silver Gavel Award
- Ohio State University Award
- First Place Award, National Association of Black Journalists
- The Armstrong Foundation Award

== Memberships and organizations ==
Roberts has served on two presidential commissions, the White House Conference on Library and Information Exchange and the White House Commission on Remembrance.

He is a board member of the Education and Research Institute and the Miami University NROTC Alumni Council and is a member of the Army and Navy Club, The American Legion, and the Church of the Epiphany (Anglican).
