= Madeleine Stowe =

American actress (born 1958)

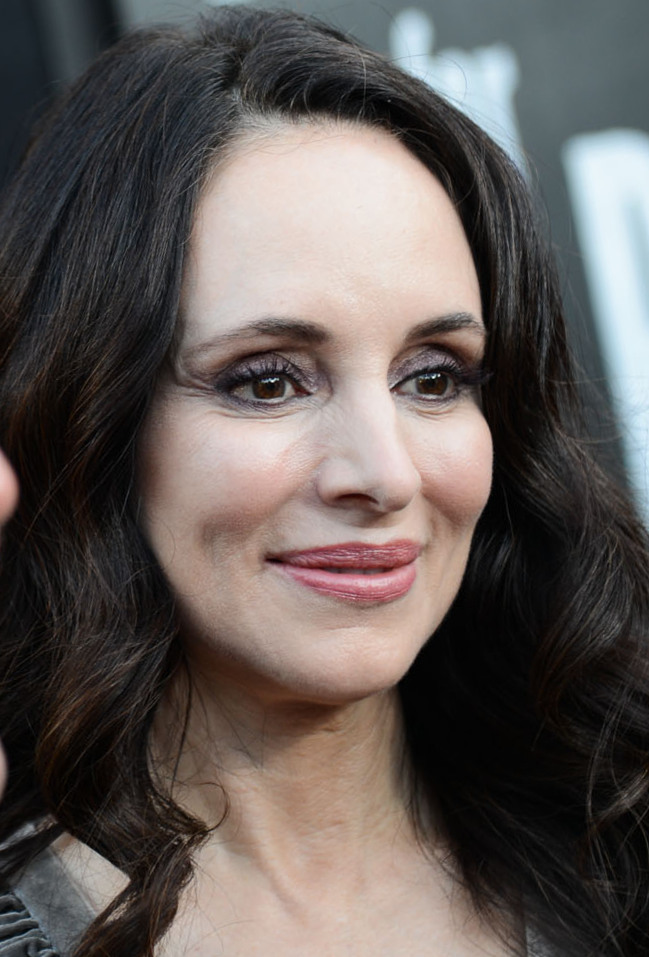
- Stowe in 2014
- Born: August 18, 1958 (age 68); Los Angeles, California, U.S.
- Occupation: Actress
- Years active: 1978–present
- Spouse: Brian Benben (m. 1982)
- Children: 1

Madeleine Stowe (born August 18, 1958) is an American actress. She appeared mostly on television before her role in the 1987 crime-comedy film Stakeout. She went on to star in the films Revenge (1990), Unlawful Entry (1992), The Last of the Mohicans (1992), Blink (1993), 12 Monkeys (1995), The General's Daughter (1999), and We Were Soldiers (2002). For her role in the 1993 independent film Short Cuts, she won the National Society of Film Critics Award for Best Supporting Actress.

From 2011 to 2015, Stowe starred as Victoria Grayson, the main antagonist of the ABC drama series Revenge. For this role, she was nominated for the 2012 Golden Globe Award for Best Actress – Television Series Drama. She also played Ingrid Kersh / Periwinkle in the HBO series It: Welcome to Derry.

== Early life and education ==
Madeleine Stowe was born at the Queen of Angels Hospital in Los Angeles, California, on August 18, 1958, the first of three children. She was raised in Eagle Rock, a section of Los Angeles. Her father, Robert, was a civil engineer from Oregon, while her mother, Mireya (née Mora Steinvorth), came from a prominent family in Costa Rica.

Stowe's father suffered from multiple sclerosis, and she accompanied him to all his medical treatments.

== Acting career ==
=== Early years ===
Stowe began her career performing on stage at the Solaris, a Beverly Hills theater, where a movie agent saw her in a play and got her several offers of appearances in TV and films. In 1978, she made her debut in an episode in the police drama series Baretta, followed by a string of TV work, with guest appearances on The Amazing Spider-Man, Barnaby Jones and Little House on the Prairie. In 1978, she played a leading role as Mary in the television movie, The Nativity (1978). She starred in two NBC miniseries: Beulah Land (1980) and The Gangster Chronicles (1981), which starred Brian Benben, her future husband. She also starred in several television films, such as Amazons (1984) and Blood & Orchids (1986). In 1984, she was featured in the music video for JD Souther's song "Go Ahead and Rain"

=== Breakthrough and film career ===
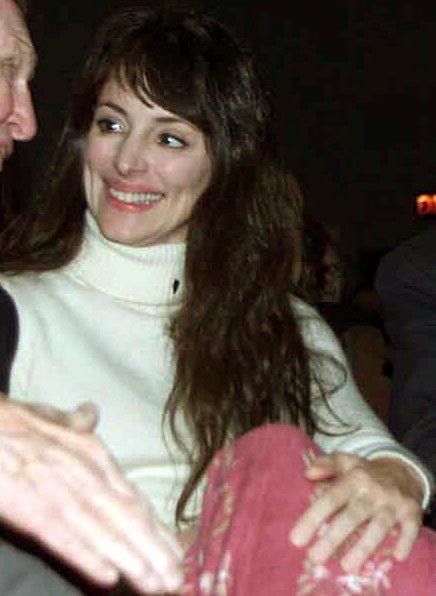
Madeleine Stowe in 2002

In 1987, Stowe appeared in her first breakthrough role in the feature film Stakeout with Richard Dreyfuss and Emilio Estevez. The film debuted at number one at the U.S. box office. In 1988, she played a leading role in Ciro Durán's film Tropical Snow, with David Carradine. She co-starred with Mark Harmon in the comedy Worth Winning, with Kevin Costner in the 1989 thriller Revenge, and opposite Jack Nicholson in 1990 in The Two Jakes. She played a leading role in the 1991 independent film Closet Land.

In 1992, she appeared opposite Kurt Russell in the crime drama Unlawful Entry. That same year, Stowe played Cora Munro in The Last of the Mohicans, which also starred Daniel Day-Lewis. Her critically acclaimed performance in the film, which grossed more than $75 million worldwide, elevated Stowe from supporting player to an A-list movie star. The next year, director Robert Altman cast Stowe in his ensemble film Short Cuts, where she gave one of her most acclaimed screen performances as the wife of a compulsively lying and adulterous police officer played by Tim Robbins. She won the National Society of Film Critics Awards for Best Supporting Actress, a Golden Globe Award and a Volpi Cup for Best Ensemble Cast for her performance in the movie. She also made a cameo appearance in Stakeout's sequel Another Stakeout. The following year, Stowe played a leading role as a blind musician in the thriller Blink, in the neo-noir thriller China Moon, and in the Western Bad Girls. The year after that, she played Kathryn Railly, a sympathetic psychiatrist, in Terry Gilliam's dystopian science fiction film 12 Monkeys. Stowe received a Saturn Awards nomination for this performance.

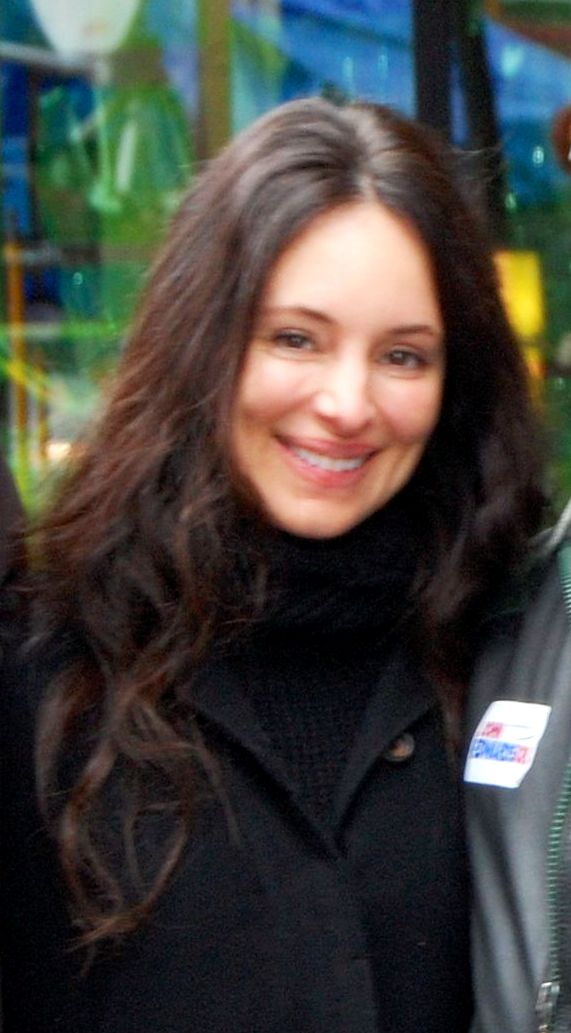
Madeleine Stowe in 2008

In 1994, Stowe was named one of People magazine's "50 Most Beautiful People in the World". In 1995, Stowe was chosen by Empire magazine as one of the "100 Sexiest Stars in Film History".

=== 2000–present ===
Stowe postponed her acting career in 1996 to concentrate on her family life. She settled for several years in a Texas ranch, with her daughter May and husband Brian Benben. In 1998, she came back with The Proposition and Playing by Heart, and then The General's Daughter, opposite John Travolta in 1999. In 2001, she starred in the science-fiction box office bomb Impostor. In 2002, she played Julia Moore in the war film We Were Soldiers with Mel Gibson, and the box office flop action-comedy Avenging Angelo opposite Sylvester Stallone. In 2003, she starred in the thriller Octane as Senga Wilson, a single mother trying to save her teenage daughter (Mischa Barton) from a bizarre cult obsessed with blood and cars.

Stowe's onscreen appearances became increasingly rare in the 2000s, as she focused on motherhood. She occasionally appeared in some TV productions, such as Saving Milly, an adaptation of Morton Kondracke's book of the same name, of a woman diagnosed with Parkinson's disease. Stowe starred in the not-picked-up Fox pilot Southern Comfort about a woman who takes over her mobster husband's business when he gets sent to prison. In 2007, she appeared in the recurring role of Dr. Samantha Kohl in Jeff Goldblum's detective drama Raines on NBC, a mid-season replacement. The series was canceled after two months. In 2009 she starred in the Lifetime movie, The Christmas Hope.

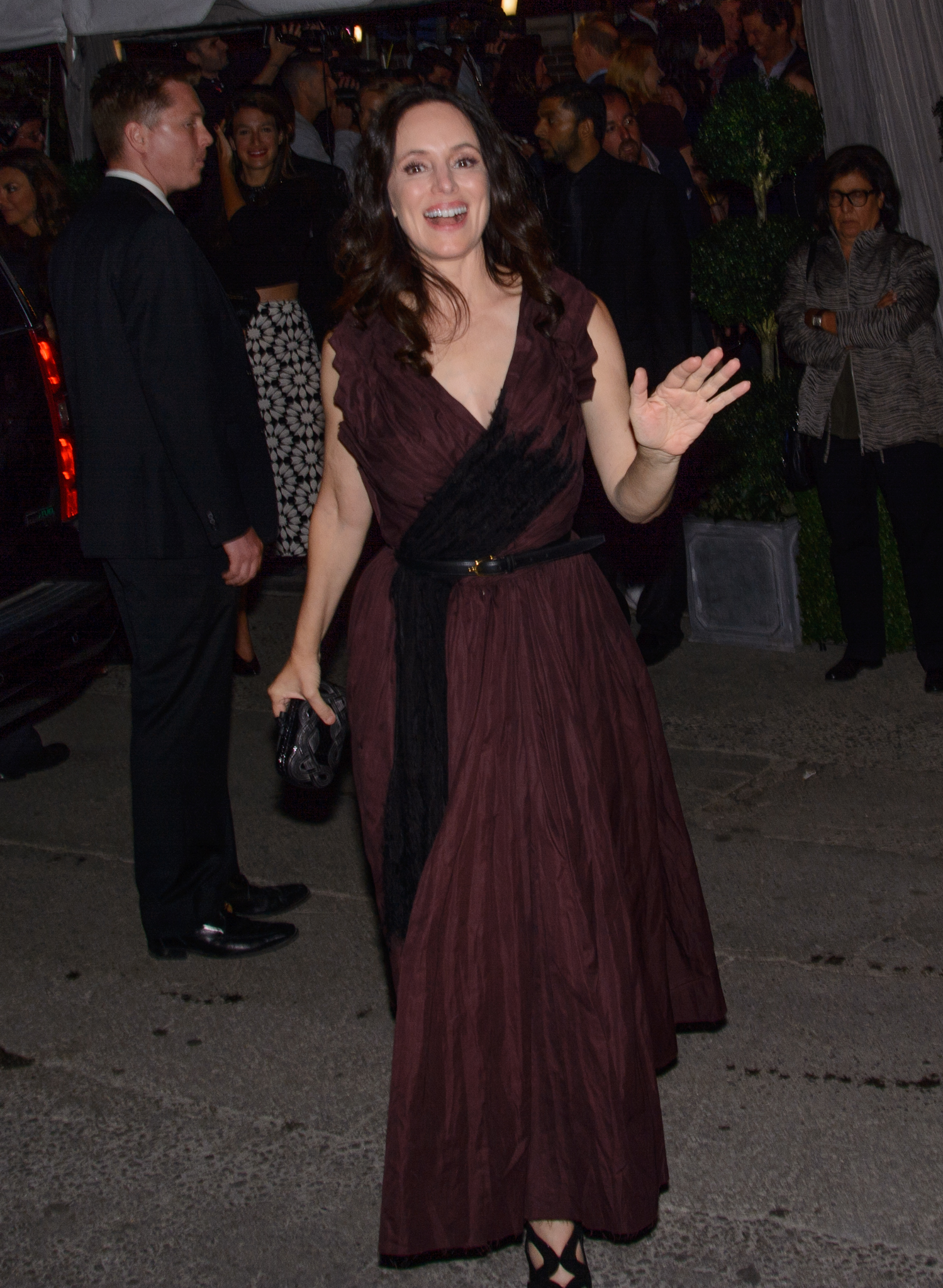
Stowe at the 2014 Toronto International Film Festival

In 2011, Stowe announced her return and began playing Victoria Grayson, the glamorous and powerful matriarch of the Grayson family, on ABC's television drama series Revenge. It debuted on September 21, and was picked up for a full season by ABC on October 13. Stowe's portrayal of the character received critical praise, and she was nominated for a Golden Globe Award for Best Actress – Television Series Drama for this role. In April 2012, she was listed at No. 5 in People magazine's annual Most Beautiful Woman list. The series ended in 2015 after four seasons and 89 episodes.

In May and June 2016, Stowe guest hosted primetime films on Turner Classic Movies, appearing in dozens of wraparounds on the channel. In 2019, she returned to acting starring as actress Margot Weston in the Netflix musical drama series, Soundtrack. The series was canceled after one season.

In 2025, Stowe stars in the HBO supernatural horror television series It: Welcome to Derry which is based on Stephen King's novel It (1986) and serves as a prequel to the films It (2017) and It Chapter Two (2019).

In 2026, Stowe stars as the conniving, wealthy heiress, Gertrude Payne in the Netflix crime drama miniseries I Will Find You adapted from Harlan Coben's 2023 novel of the same name.

== Personal life ==
In 1982, Stowe married Brian Benben, whom she had met on the set of the NBC miniseries The Gangster Chronicles the previous year. Together they have one daughter, born in 1996. Before living in Pacific Palisades, Los Angeles, they lived on a ranch west of Austin, near Fredericksburg, Texas. As of 2025, Stowe resides in Memphis, Tennessee in the Midtown historic district of Chickasaw Gardens.

In 2008, Stowe traveled to Haiti and helped found Artists for Peace and Justice. She serves on the board of directors of the foundation.

== Filmography ==
=== Film ===
Year	Title	Role	Notes
1981	Gangster Wars	Ruth Lasker	
1987	Stakeout	Maria McGuire	
1988	Tropical Snow	Marina	
1989	Worth Winning	Veronica Briskow	
1990	Revenge	Mireya Mendez	
1990	The Two Jakes	Lillian Bodine	
1991	Closet Land	Victim	
1992	Unlawful Entry	Karen Carr	
1992	The Last of the Mohicans	Cora Munro	
1993	Another Stakeout	Maria McGuire	Uncredited cameo
1993	Short Cuts	Sherri Shepard	
1994	China Moon	Rachel Munro	
1994	Blink	Emma Brody	
1994	Bad Girls	Cody Zamora	
1995	12 Monkeys	Kathryn Railly	
1998	The Proposition	Eleanor Barret	
1998	Playing by Heart	Gracie	
1999	The General's Daughter	Warr. Off. Sara Sunhill	
2001	Impostor	Maya Olham	
2002	We Were Soldiers	Julia Moore	
2002	Avenging Angelo	Jennifer Barrett Allieghieri	
2003	Octane	Senga Wilson	aka Pulse

=== Television ===
Year	Title	Role	Notes
1978	Baretta	Anna	Episode: "The Marker"
1978	The Amazing Spider-Man	Maria Calderon	Episode: "Escort to Danger"
1978	The Nativity	Mary, mother of Jesus	Movie
1978	The Deerslayer	Hetty Hutter	Movie
1979	Barnaby Jones	Diane	Episode: "School of Terror"
1980	Beulah Land	Selma Kendrick Davis	Miniseries
1980	Little House on the Prairie	Annie Crane	Episode: "Portrait of Love"
1981	Trapper John, M.D.	Cassie	Episode: "Creepy Time Gal"
1981	The Gangster Chronicles	Ruth Lasker	Miniseries
1984	Amazons	Dr. Sharon Fields	Movie
1986	Blood & Orchids	Hester Ashley Murdoch	Movie
2002	The Magnificent Ambersons	Isabel Amberson Minafer	Movie
2005	Saving Milly	Milly Martinez	Movie
2006	Southern Comfort	Charlotte	Pilot
2007	Raines	Dr. Samantha Kohl	5 episodes
2009	The Christmas Hope	Patricia Addison	Movie
2011–2015	Revenge	Victoria Grayson	89 episodes
2016	12 Monkeys	Lillian	Episode: "Memory of Tomorrow"
2019	Soundtrack	Margot Weston	10 episodes
2021	Eli Roth's History of Horror	Herself	Docuseries; episode: "Infections"
2025	It: Welcome to Derry	Ingrid Kersh / Periwinkle	6 episodes
2026	I Will Find You	Gertrude Payne	5 episodes

== Awards and nominations ==
Year	Association	Category	Work	Result
1993	Venice Film Festival	Special Volpi Cup for Best Ensemble Cast	Short Cuts	Recipient
1994	National Society of Film Critics	Best Supporting Actress	Short Cuts	Won
1994	Golden Globe Awards	Special Award for Ensemble Cast (non-competitive)	Short Cuts	Recipient
1996	Sci-Fi Universe Magazine, USA	Best Actress in a Genre Motion Picture	12 Monkeys	Won
1996	Saturn Awards	Best Actress	12 Monkeys	Nominated
2000	Blockbuster Entertainment Awards	Favorite Supporting Actress - Suspense	The General's Daughter	Nominated
2000	ALMA Awards	Outstanding Actress in a Feature Film	The General's Daughter	Nominated
2003	American Veterans Center	Best Actress	We Were Soldiers	Won
2005	Imagen Awards	Best Actress	Saving Milly	Won
2012	Golden Globe Awards	Best Actress – Television Series Drama	Revenge	Nominated
2012	Dorian Awards	Television Performance of the Year	Revenge	Nominated
2012	ALMA Awards	Favorite TV Actress – Drama	Revenge	Nominated
2013	TV Guide Awards	Favorite Villain	Revenge	Nominated
2014	Keck School of Medicine of USC	Humanitarian Award		Won
