= Saving Milly =

2005 American television film

- Genre: Drama
- Based on: Saving Milly by Morton Kondracke
- Teleplay by: Jeff Arch
- Directed by: Dan Curtis
- Starring: Bruce Greenwood; Madeleine Stowe; Robert Wisden; Claudia Ferri; Rob LaBelle
- Theme music composer: Lee Holdridge
- Country of origin: United States
- Original language: English

Production
- Producers: Daniel H. Blatt; Tracy Jeffery; David Kennedy
- Cinematography: Jon Joffin
- Running time: 87 minutes

Original release
- Network: CBS
- Release: March 13, 2005

Saving Milly is a 2005 American made-for-television drama film that stars Madeleine Stowe and Bruce Greenwood, which first aired on CBS on March 13, 2005. It is an adaptation of Morton Kondracke's nonfiction book of the same name.

== Plot ==
Madeleine Stowe and Bruce Greenwood star in this drama based on the best-selling book and real-life journey of political journalist Mort Kondracke. The movie recounts his inspiring love story with his activist wife, Milly, and the dramatic change in their lives in the years after she is diagnosed with Parkinson's disease.

As a young journalist in Chicago in the '60s, Mort Kondracke envisioned marrying a Vassar graduate whose status would facilitate his goal of becoming a top Washington journalist. His calculated plans go awry when he meets and marries Milly Martinez, a brash part-Mexican, part-Catholic, part-Jewish liberal activist who captures his heart. In Washington, D.C., the loving, strong-willed partners build a passionate and volatile marriage while debating everything from politics to how to raise their two daughters as well as her insatiable, all-consuming desire to save the world by championing a never-ending list of causes—all overshadowed by Mort's struggle with alcoholism.

In 1987, their lives take a dramatic turn when Milly notices a change in her handwriting and a numbness in her fingers. After a series of tests, her worst fears are confirmed and, at the age of 47, Milly is diagnosed with Parkinson's disease.

Holding to his promise of "in sickness and in health," Mort changes his focus from being a die-hard careerist to becoming a devoted caregiver and Parkinson's advocate and the love between the couple grows stronger. As her illness progresses, his life becomes committed to saving Milly."

== Cast ==
- Madeleine Stowe as Milly
- Bruce Greenwood as Mort Kondracke
- Robert Wisden as Fred Barnes
- Claudia Ferri as Norma Alvarado
- Rob LaBelle as Mark
- Brenda Campbell as Joan Samuelson
- Kyla Wise as Andrea Kondracke (as Kyla Anderson)
- Erica Carroll as Alexandra Kondracke
- Kylee Dubois as Alexandra Kondracke (Age 16) (as Kyle Dubois)
- Jessica Lowndes as Andrea Kondracke (Age 15)
- Jose Del Buey as Carlos
- Dan Joffre as Tony Hot Dog (as David 'Dan' Joffre)
- Leah Cairns as Senator's Aide
- Susan Hogan as Senator Bates
- Michael J. Fox as Himself (Uncredited)
- Allison Hossack

== Reception ==
The film received a positive review from The New York Times.

== Awards and nominations ==
- 2005 Humanitas Prize - Nominated - Jeff Arch for 90 Minute or Longer Category
- 2005 Imagen Award - Won - Madeleine Stowe for Best Actress - Television
