= Blood & Orchids =

1986 television film directed by Jerry Thorpe

- Genre: Drama
- Based on: Blood & Orchids by Norman Katkov
- Written by: Norman Katkov
- Directed by: Jerry Thorpe
- Starring: Kris Kristofferson; Jane Alexander; Madeleine Stowe; José Ferrer; Sean Young
- Music by: Charles Fox; Mark Snow
- Country of origin: United States
- Original language: English

Production
- Executive producer: Malcolm Stuart
- Producers: Andrew Adelson; Kim C. Friese
- Cinematography: Chuck Arnold
- Editors: Marvin Adelson; Lori Jane Coleman
- Running time: 240 minutes (including commercials)
- Production company: Lorimar Productions

Original release
- Network: CBS
- Release: February 23, 1986

Blood & Orchids is a 1986 made-for-TV crime-drama film. Written for the screen by Norman Katkov, it was an adaptation of Katkov's own novel which, in turn, was inspired by the 1932 Massie Trial in Honolulu, Hawaii. The film was aired on CBS as a two-night broadcast on February 23 and 24, 1986.

== Plot ==
In Hawaii in 1937, four young men find a white woman, beaten nearly to death, and take her to a hospital, only to be charged later with her rape and assault. During their trial, the woman's husband, a lieutenant in the US Navy, fatally shoots one of them and later stands trial himself. The trial brings into stark relief the racial tensions that tear at the social fabric of Territorial Hawaii in the years prior to World War II.

Socialite Hester Ashley Murdoch leaves an officers' dinner party at the US naval base in Honolulu in the company of a man who is not her husband, Lieutenant Lloyd Murdoch, but rather Murdoch's best friend. The friend coldly announces that he is terminating their relationship, though Hester is carrying his child. Outraged, she announces that she will tell her husband and the commanding admiral on the station. In retaliation, the friend beats her savagely and leaves her where she lies.

Four young men find her and take her to a hospital, although they fear being blamed for her beating because she is haole (white) and they are variously of Hawaiian or Asian descent. At the hospital, Hester's mother Doris assumes that the four are to blame, but Hester says, "It's nobody's fault; I was the pregnant one!" The shocked Doris tells her daughter that she must cooperate in Doris's campaign to blame the young men, saying that Hester must think of Doris's "position" in high society. Accordingly, the four are charged with rape and assault.

Most of the law-enforcement officers involved, including those of the Honolulu Police Department and the Navy Shore Patrol, assume that the young men are guilty, but Detective Captain Curt Maddox is unconvinced. Meanwhile, the defendants get a court-appointed attorney who strives valiantly to show that the four must be innocent of the crime because of time-line conflicts with the best estimate of when the beating took place. The trial of the four ends abruptly when Lieutenant Murdoch, at the height of an at-the-bench discussion between the judge and the two opposing counsels, abruptly draws his service automatic and shoots the lead defendant twice in the head, killing him.

Now Murdoch must stand trial (in a civilian court) for murder in the first degree. Doris hires famed criminal attorney Walter Bergmann to defend him. The pretrial investigation is complicated by an affair between Detective Maddox and Bergmann's wife Leonore.

The case is further complicated when some Navy petty officers, all friends of Murdoch, kidnap the three remaining defendants, tie them in spread-eagle fashion to an improvised rack, and beat them to get them to confess. The Navy men repeatedly use the word "bilge", which, according to the film, is common Navy slang for useless information or known falsehood. The defense lawyer interviews the three after they are taken to a hospital. There, they finally blurt out, "They said, 'Bilge!'" This gives the lawyer the vital clue he needs. Maddox follows up the clue and has the three arrested.

Murdoch's trial climaxes with Bergmann summing up by claiming that Murdoch's action was excusable: "Those animals beat her!" Then Hester, plagued by her conscience, blurts out, "They're innocent! They're innocent!" Although Bergmann roughly escorts her from the courtroom, the damage is done: Murdoch is convicted.

Subsequently, Doris hires an interior decorator to redecorate her home. In the middle of her interview with the decorator, Detective Maddox arrives with a warrant for the arrests of Doris and Hester. Hester, crushed, rushes to her bathroom and hangs herself from the shower head. Doris discovers Hester's body and cries out in anguish.

== Cast ==
- Kris Kristofferson as Detective Captain Curtis "Curt" Maddox, HPD
- Jane Alexander as Doris Ashley
- Sean Young as Leonore Bergmann, Walter Bergmann's wife
- Jose Ferrer as Walter Bergmann, counsellor-at-law
- Susan Blakely as Marie Farrell
- David Clennon as Philip Murray
- George Coe as Dr. Lansing, who examines Hester
- Richard Dysart as Harvey Koster
- Elizabeth Lindsey as Sarah
- Haunani Minne as Princess Luahine, presumably a member of the deposed royal house of Hawaii, she breaks her self-imposed isolation to take up the cause of the four Hawaiians who are so ill-used by the haole community
- William Russ as Lieutenant Lloyd Murdoch USN
- James Saito as Halehone, the Hawaiian lawyer who represents the accused men
- Matt Salinger as Bryce Parker
- Madeleine Stowe as Hester Ashley Murdoch, Lloyd's wife
- Arthur Rosenberg as Sergeant Jack Keller
- Sandy McPeak as Rear Admiral Glenn Langon, USN, the 14th Naval District commandant

== Reception ==
The film's acting, courtroom scenes, Hawaii scenery, and insights into Hawaii's territorial history were praised. Critics felt the subplots involving romances among the lead characters were unnecessary.

The New York Times critic John J. O'Connor gave a positive review in which he wrote Blood and Orchids "captures a remarkably authentic sense of period and Miss Alexander, coldly elegant in her relatively small role, creates a scheming villain with an aplomb that leaves Joan Collins looking like an amateur". He added the film "robustly roots for the underdogs as it exposes the diseased underbelly of power and exploitation".

This film was nominated for two awards, including one Emmy Award for costuming and an Artios Award for casting.

== Home media ==
Warner Bros. released Blood & Orchids on DVD on February 2, 2010, as part of the Archive Collection.
