= David Kennedy (film producer) =

American film producer

- Born: November 21, 1941; Stamford, Connecticut, U.S.
- Died: June 14, 2015 (aged 73); Los Angeles, California, U.S.
- Education: University of Notre Dame
- Occupations: Producer, talent agent

David Michael Kennedy (November 21, 1941 – June 14, 2015) was an American film producer and talent agent. His work includes Saving Milly and Dark Shadows, based on the popular gothic soap opera created by Dan Curtis. Kennedy coincidentally ran Dan Curtis Productions until Curtis' death in March 2006.

Kennedy was born in Stamford Connecticut in November 1941, the son of J. Walter Kennedy, who served as commissioner of the National Basketball Association (NBA). He attended University of Notre Dame where he played football and was on the track team. His first job after college was as a producer with NBC Sports.

He died in June 2015, following knee replacement surgery in Los Angeles, at the age of 73.
