= Wesley Theological Seminary =

United Methodist Church seminary in Washington, D.C.

Coordinates: 38.9398°N 77.0901°W

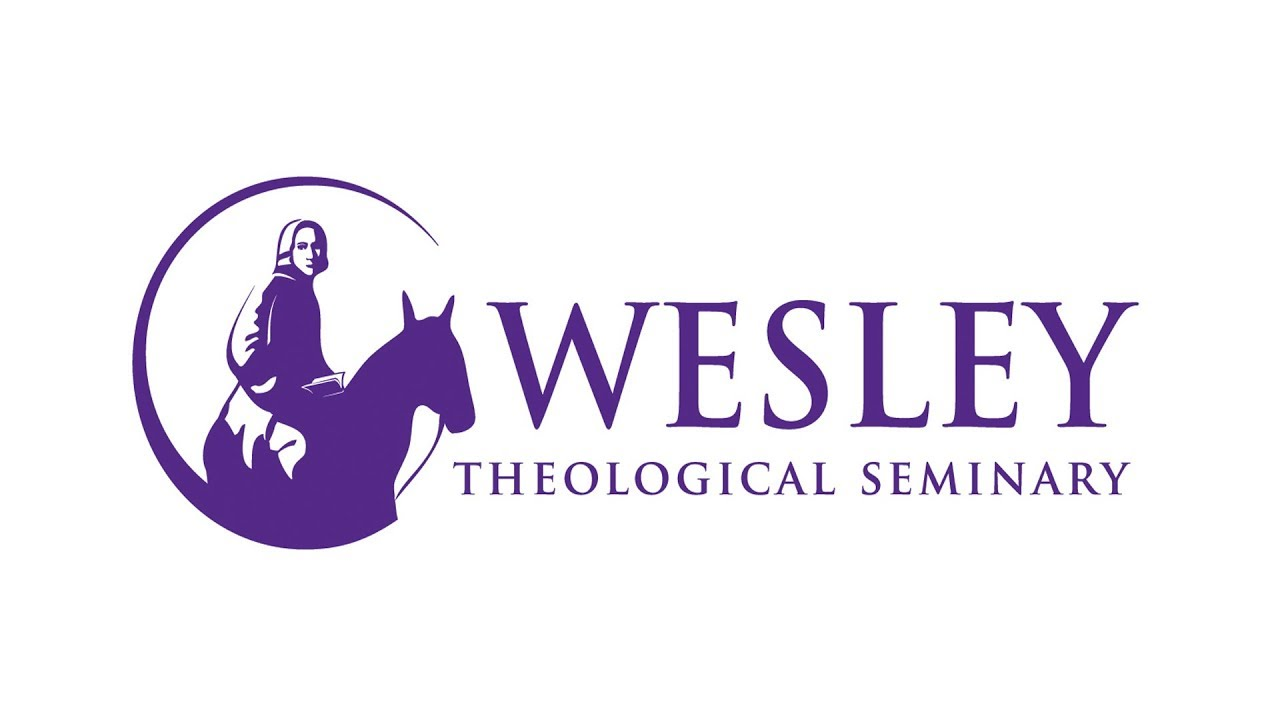
- Former name: Westminster Theological Seminary
- Type: Seminary
- Established: 1882
- Religious affiliation: United Methodist Church
- Academic affiliations: Washington Theological Consortium
- President: David McAllister-Wilson
- Location: Washington, D.C., United States
- Campus: Urban
- Colors: Purple and White
- Website: www.wesleyseminary.edu

Wesley Theological Seminary is a United Methodist Church seminary in Washington, D.C. It was founded in 1882.

== History ==
Wesley Theological Seminary can trace its roots back to the 1881 meeting of the Methodist Protestant Church's Maryland Annual Conference. Legislation was passed during the meeting that would lead to the founding of Westminster Theological Seminary in 1882. The seminary was located on the campus of Western Maryland College in Westminster, Maryland (hence its name).

In 1939, Westminster became one of the ten theological schools under the newly formed Methodist Church. Upon its association with this new, larger denomination, Westminster quickly experienced a period of growth. Because of this continued growth, it was determined in 1955 that Westminster should move to a more central location, namely, Washington, D.C. In 1958, Westminster moved to its current location and was renamed Wesley Theological Seminary.

Upon the formation of the United Methodist Church, Wesley became one of the 13 theological schools under the jurisdiction of the United Methodist Church and still is to this day.

== Academics ==
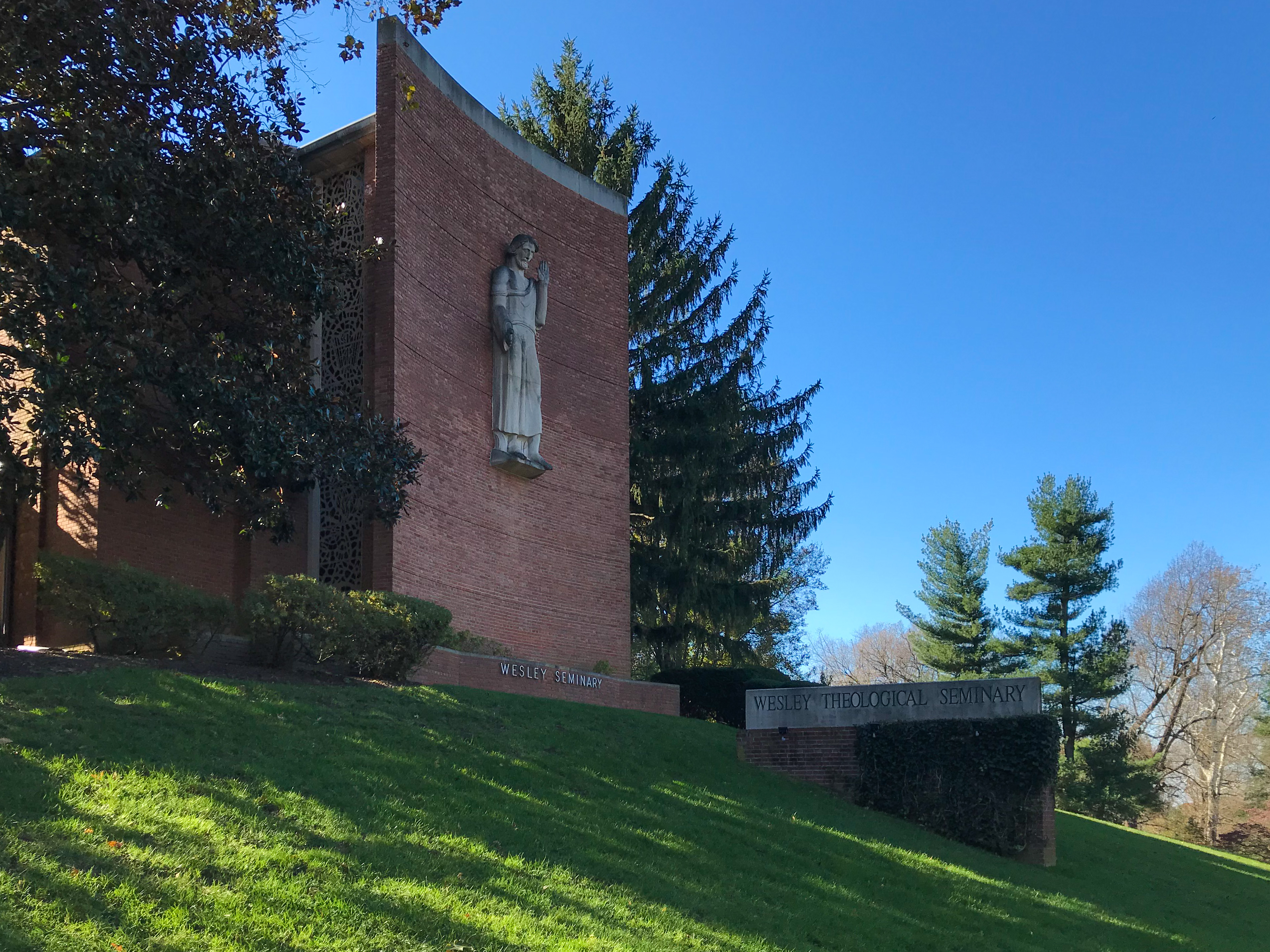
Wesley Theological Seminary's campus in northwest Washington, D.C.

Wesley is a member of the Washington Theological Consortium and is accredited by the Association of Theological Schools in the United States and Canada.

Wesley offers Master of Divinity (M.Div.), Master of Arts (MA), Master of Theological Studies (MTS), and Doctor of Ministry (D.Min.) degrees. In addition, Wesley offers a dual degree program in concert with neighboring American University. Graduates of the dual degree program receive a Master of Theological Studies from Wesley and a Master of Arts degree in International Peace and Conflict Resolution or International Development.

Wesley also offers the National Capital Semester for Seminarians program which gives seminarians the opportunity to come to Washington, DC to see how theology interacts with public policy. This program is conducted by the Churches' Center for Theology and Public Policy which is an ecumenical organization that serves to research and explore the relationship between theology and issues of social and public policy.

== Administration ==
Wesley Theological Seminary is governed by a Board of Governors and is under the jurisdiction of the Baltimore-Washington Conference of the United Methodist Church.

As of late 2023, the president is David McAllister-Wilson, who was installed in 2002. Since its formation in 1882, Westminster/Wesley has had ten presidents: Thomas Hamilton Lewis (1882-1886), James Thomas Ward (1886-1897), Hugh Latimer Elderdice (1897-1933), Fred Garrigus Holloway (1933-1935), Charles Edward Forlines (1935-1943), Lester Allen Welliver (1943-1955), Norman L. Trott (1955-1967), John Lowden Knight (1967-1982), and G. Douglass Lewis (1982-2002).

== Student body ==
The student body of Wesley Theological Seminary is culturally, denominationally, and theologically diverse. In 2008 there were 760 master and doctoral students of which 56% were women and 43% were an ethnic minority. Thirty-eight denominations were represented among members of the student body. Denominationally, the student body was primarily made up of United Methodists. However, there were significant numbers of students from other Methodist and non-Methodist faith traditions such as African Methodist Episcopal, African Methodist Episcopal Zion, Baptist, Presbyterian Church (U.S.A.), Episcopal, United Church of Christ, and Unitarian Universalist.

By 2013, the seminary hosted 700 students from 30 denominations.

By 2023, the seminary hosted 701 students, of which 53.21% were from an ethnic minority background and 48.5% were women.

== Notable alumni ==
- Asnage Castelly, Olympic wrestler
- Canaan Banana - First President of Zimbabwe
- Arlester Brown - U.S. Army veteran, Methodist minister, Legion of Honour recipient
- Leontine Kelly - First black woman to become a bishop in a major Christian denomination
- Don Knight (actor) - English Movie, Television, and Stage Actor
- Michel Martin - Journalist
- C. Anthony Muse - Maryland State Senator
- Mike McCurry - former White House Press Secretary
- Ann Ritonia - U.S. marine and Episcopal priest
- Harvey Stower - Member of the Wisconsin State Assembly and mayor of Amery, Wisconsin
- Ed Whitfield - United States Representative from Kentucky
