= Avenging Angelo =

- Official DVD cover
- Directed by: Ron Samuels
- Written by: Will Aldis; Steve Mackall
- Produced by: Tarak Ben Ammar; Elie Samaha; Stanley Wilson
- Starring: Sylvester Stallone; Madeleine Stowe; Anthony Quinn
- Music by: Bill Conti
- Production companies: Quinta Communications; Cinema Holdings; Lionweed
- Distributed by: Columbia TriStar Home Video
- Release dates: September 8, 2002 (Deauville American Film Festival); May 20, 2003 (United States)
- Running time: 96 minutes
- Country: United States
- Language: English
- Budget: $17 million
- Box office: $824,597

Avenging Angelo is a 2002 American action comedy film starring Sylvester Stallone (who also directed), Madeleine Stowe, and Anthony Quinn. The film follows bodyguard Frankie Delano (Stallone) who vows to protect Jennifer Allieghieri Barrett (Stowe) after her father, mafia kingpin Angelo Allieghieri (Quinn) is gunned down. The film was the second straight-to-video American release for Stallone after D-Tox (2002). Quinn was suffering from terminal throat cancer while Avenging Angelo was being filmed—and died before it was released. The film received mostly negative reviews from critics.

== Plot ==
Years ago, a mob boss named Lucio Malatesta (George Touliatos) pinned the murder of rival Sammy Carboni (Gino Marrocco) on another rival named Angelo Allieghieri (Anthony Quinn), which led to Sammy's son Gianni vowing revenge.

Frankie Delano (Sylvester Stallone) has spent his life safeguarding Angelo as well as Angelo's daughter, Jennifer Barrett (Madeleine Stowe), whose unsavory husband Kip Barrett (Harry Van Gorkum) has had their young son Rawley (Ezra Perlman) placed in a boarding school against Jennifer's wishes.

Jennifer was raised by her adoptive parents Whitney Towers (John Gilbert) and Peggy Towers (Dawn Greenhalgh) and is not aware that Angelo is her father.

After Angelo is killed in a restaurant by a hit man named Bruno (Billy Gardell), Frankie introduces himself, tells Jennifer who he is and what he has been doing.

A neurotic mess, Jennifer can barely handle the news that Kip is a philanderer, let alone the revelation that she is a gangster's daughter. But a DVD prepared by Angelo in the case of just such an event convinces Jennifer that it's the truth.

Jennifer certainly doesn't want a full-time bodyguard, even Frankie. She ditches Kip and then falls for Italian romance novelist Marcello (Raoul Bova), who lectures at her book club. Frankie has suspicions about Marcello, but his job is to stay on the sidelines.

Frankie rescues Jennifer from a string of attacks. With many of Angelo's enemies, including Lucio Malatesta, terminated, Frankie allows her to visit Italy with Marcello. But it turns out that Marcello is actually Gianni Carboni, who had Angelo killed. And now Gianni plans to kill Jennifer.

It is up to Frankie to protect her one more time.

== Cast ==
- Sylvester Stallone as Frankie Delano
- Madeleine Stowe as Jennifer Allieghieri Barrett
- Anthony Quinn as Angelo Allieghieri
- Raoul Bova as Marcello/Gianni Carboni
- Harry Van Gorkum as Kip Barrett
- Billy Gardell as Bruno
- George Touliatos as Lucio Malatesta

== Production ==
=== Filming ===
The film was shot in Hamilton, Ontario, Canada and Castellammare del Golfo, Sicily.

== Reception ==
=== Critical response ===
The film was met with mostly negative reviews by most critics. Scott Weinberg for eFILMCRITICS.com wrote that "Sly - despite his seemingly unquenchable desire to prove me otherwise - deserves better than this".

Rotten Tomatoes gives it a 13% approval rating based on 8 reviews, with an average score of 4.41/10.
