= The Proposition (1998 film) =

- Directed by: Lesli Linka Glatter
- Written by: Rick Ramage
- Produced by: Ted Field; Scott Kroopf; Diane Nabatoff
- Starring: Kenneth Branagh; Madeleine Stowe; William Hurt; Neil Patrick Harris; Robert Loggia; Blythe Danner
- Cinematography: Peter Sova
- Edited by: Jacqueline Cambas
- Music by: Stephen Endelman
- Distributed by: PolyGram Filmed Entertainment
- Release date: March 27, 1998
- Running time: 110 minutes
- Country: United States
- Language: English
- Box office: $147,773

The Proposition is a 1998 American drama film directed by Lesli Linka Glatter and starring Madeleine Stowe, Kenneth Branagh, William Hurt and Robert Loggia.

== Plot ==
A young man, Roger Martin, is propositioned by the lawyer of a wealthy businessman, Arthur Barret, to sleep with his wife Eleanor for a large sum, as the couple wish to have a child but Arthur is sterile. At the first attempt Eleanor does not fall pregnant, but subsequent efforts yield success. However, by then Roger is obsessed by Eleanor, believing he is madly in love, even though she makes it clear it is only a business arrangement and that she loves her husband. Arthur bans Roger from seeing Eleanor again, but Roger then threatens to expose the scheme, bringing disgrace to the family. Arthur then phones his lawyer to tell him of the problems Roger is causing.

A young priest, Father Michael McKinnon, arrives in the parish and is introduced by the Senior priest to the Barrets as “his favourite family in the whole world” as they make large donations to the church. He is told to “befriend” them, but keeps declining their dinner invitations. Eventually he accepts, but ends up in an argument with Arthur about his brother's financial investment with Nazi Germany. The furious Arthur throws him from his house, but Michael reveals that he is the son of his brother, i.e. Arthur's nephew.

Eleanor seems drawn to Michael, and goes to assist him with a pauper's burial. Michael says that he always looks at the dead faces, and remembers them always. He opens the coffin, and Eleanor recognizes the face of Roger! In her shock she staggers backwards and falls into the empty grave. She is very traumatized and loses the baby. In the following days she shuns her husband, believing that he had Roger killed out of jealous hatred. Eventually she relents and they are reconciled.

But then Eleanor starts to see more of Father Michael, and they develop a relationship which leads to love. Arthur has a lady running the house, Syril, who realizes that Eleanor is seeing Michael. She tells Arthur of this, but encourages him to allow it, as Eleanor can then fall pregnant again. One night Michael comes to the Barret mansion and breaks in to find Eleanor. Syril sees this happening but doesn't prevent it. Eleanor then finds herself pregnant again, this time with Michael's child. But she abruptly ends her relationship with him, and refuses to see him again. When Eleanor begins to give birth she is in agony, and thinks she may not survive. She sends for Father Dryer to minister last rites to her, but he is out of town. So Michael goes instead, but before the baby is born she dies. However the doctor is able to complete the delivery, with Michael assisting, and twins are born. Michael tells Arthur that they are his children, and that he will be taking them with him to England – No Negotiation! As Eleanor is lying in her coffin in the church, Michael comes to see her, but is stopped when he realizes that Arthur and Syril are at the coffin. He stops short, and overhears Arthur asking Syril why she killed Roger. She explains that she poisoned him once Eleanor conceived as a favour to Arthur, whom she loves. Arthur refuses to accept her, and Michael then agrees to negotiate a compromise. A deal is reached, in which Arthur keeps the children, naming one Michael, while Michael remains at the Boston church. But Arthur has a large funeral for Eleanor – with an empty coffin, whilst Michael buries her in a pauper's coffin and grave. Afterwards Arthur brings some flowers to her grave, and says that she would have preferred that burial.

== Cast ==
- Kenneth Branagh as Father Michael McKinnon
- Madeleine Stowe as Eleanor Barret
- William Hurt as Arthur Barret
- Robert Loggia as Hannibal Thurman
- Blythe Danner as Syril Danning
- Ken Cheeseman as Wayne Fenton
- Josef Sommer as Father Dryer
- Neil Patrick Harris as Roger Martin
- Thomas Downey as Torrey Harrington
- Michael Bradshaw as The Butler

== Reception ==
The Proposition was poorly received by critics and flopped at the box office upon its limited release. On the review aggregator website Rotten Tomatoes, 11% of 9 critics' reviews are positive.

== Filming locations ==
Church scenes were filmed at Emmanuel Episcopal Church, Boston. Scenes for the Barret's estate were filmed at Castle Hill (Ipswich, Massachusetts).
