= Warren Eckstein =

American pet trainer and author

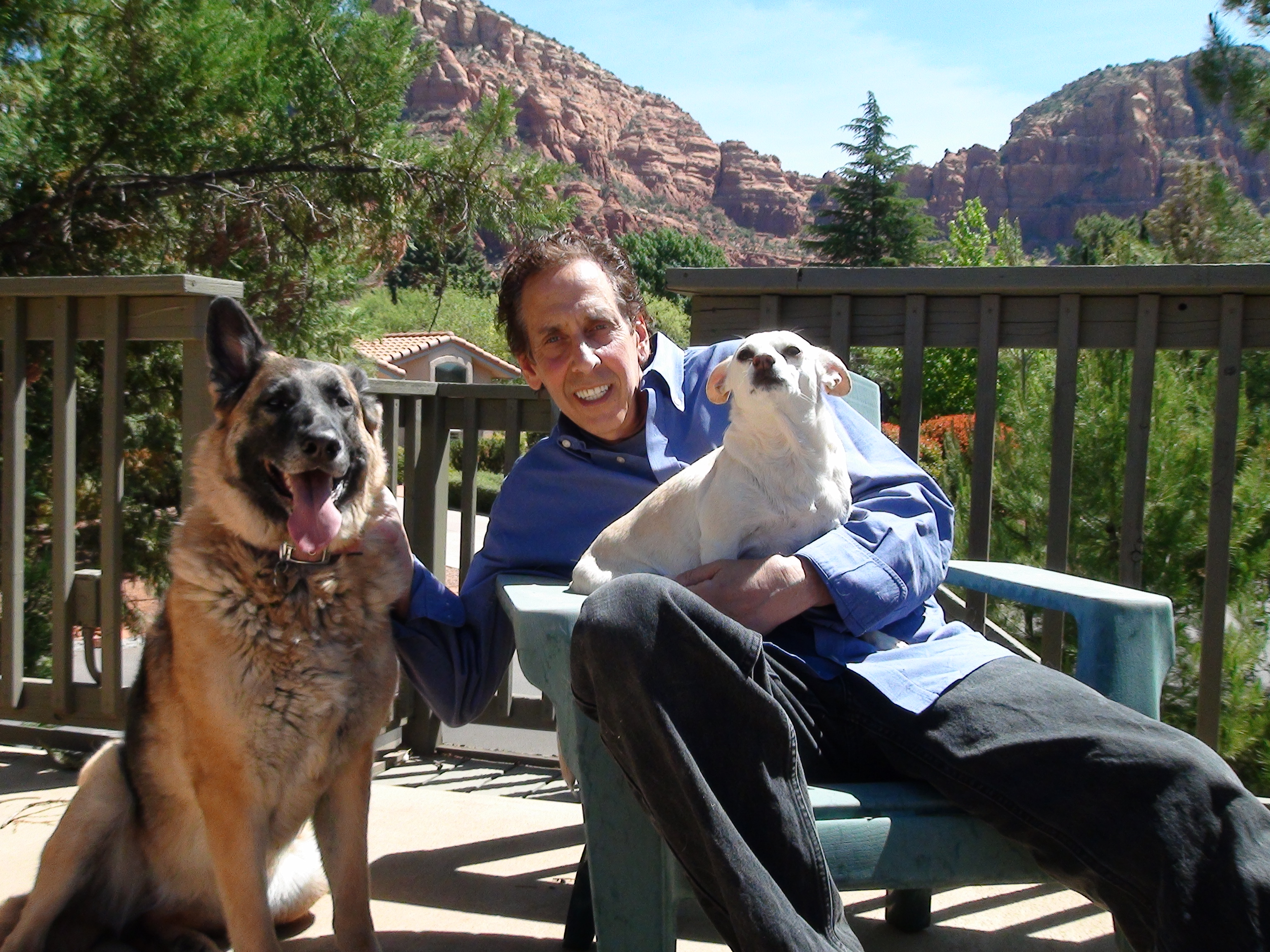
Eckstein in Sedona, Arizona

Warren Eckstein (born April 6, 1949) is an American "pet behaviorist", animal trainer, animal rights activist, humorist, author, director of the Hugs & Kisses Animal Fund, and broadcaster in the United States who hosts The Pet Show, a radio talk show syndicated by Radio America. Prior to that, Eckstein was resident animal expert for Saturday Morning Live, a local New York City-based series hosted by Gene Rayburn, which aired on WNEW-TV from 1982 to 1983.

Eckstein was born in Oceanside, New York, the son of Ruth and Charles Eckstein. His nephew (his sister's son) is actor Michael Rosenbaum.

== Bibliography ==
=== Books ===
Books authored by Warren Eckstein include:

- 1980: Yes, Dog, That's Right! (with Fay Eckstein) Alpine Pubns (ISBN 978-0931866036)
- 1984: Pet Aerobics: How to Solve Your Pets' Behavior Problems, Improve Their Health, Lengthen Their Lives and Have Fun Doing It (with Fay Eckstein) Holt, Rinehart and Winston (ASIN: B001I4QRZO)
- 1985: Understanding Your Pet: The Eckstein Method of Pet Therapy and Behavior Training (with Fay Eckstein) Henry Holt & Company (ISBN 978-0030006999)
- 1990: How to Get Your Cat to Do What You Want (With Fay Eckstein) Villard (ISBN 978-0394579078)
- 1990: The Illustrated Cat's Life Fawcett Publications (ISBN 978-0449904664)
- 1992: How to Get Your Dog to Do What You Want Ballantine Books (ISBN 978-0449909560)
- 1996: Understanding Your Pet Random House (ASIN: B001LNK0A0)
- 1995: The Illustrated Dog's Life Fawcett Publications (ISBN 978-0449906699)
- 1998: Memoirs of a Pet Therapist: A Tail All Book (with Denise Madden), Fawcett Publications (ISBN 978-0449911235)
