= Arlester Brown =

U.S. Army veteran, minister, and educator (born 1924)

The Reverend Arlester Brown
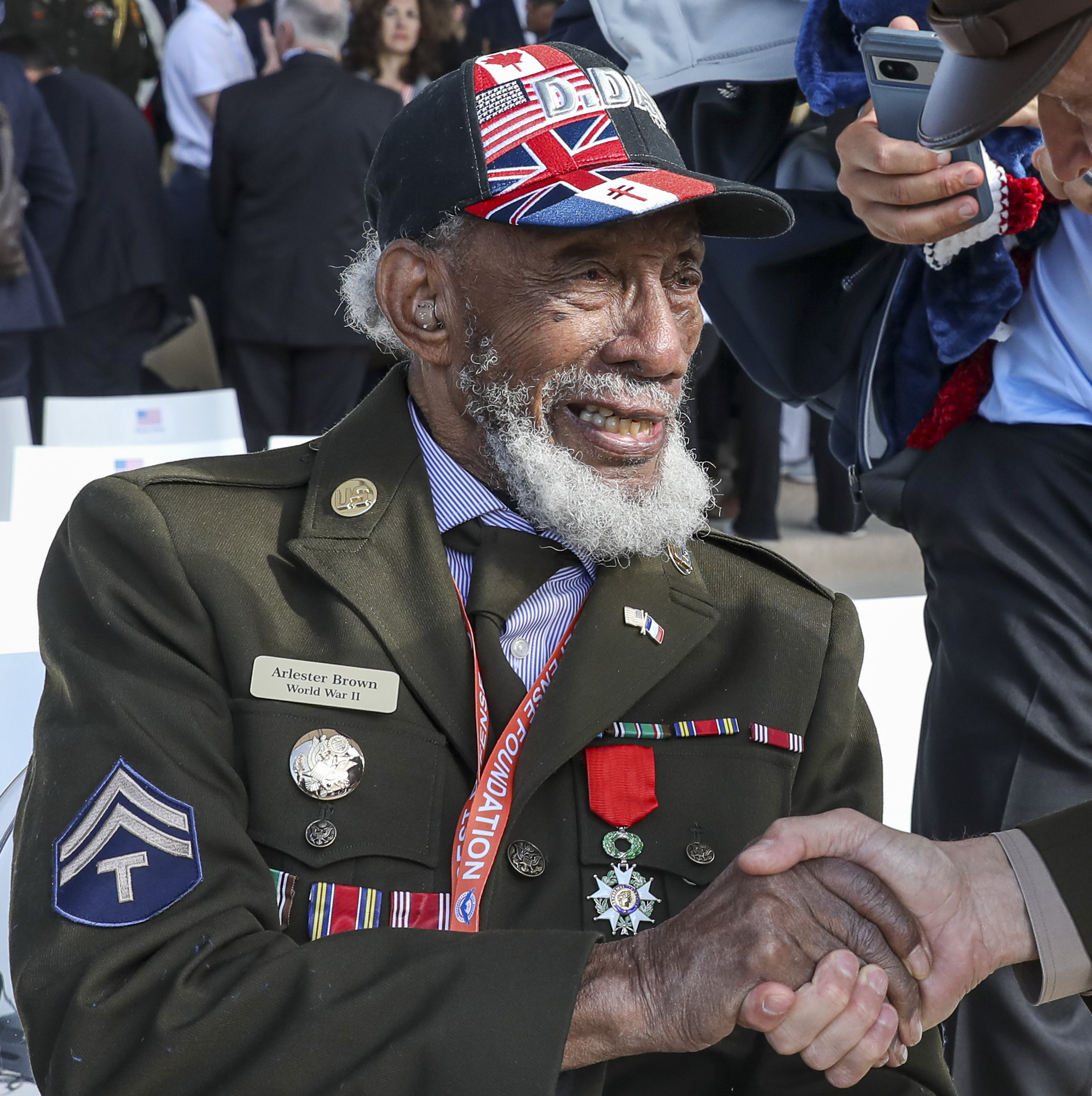
- Brown pictured during D-Day Anniversary Ceremony, 2024

Personal details
- Born: April 1, 1924 (age 102) Homer, Louisiana, U.S.
- Spouse(s): Ozeal Shyne Brown (m. 1949; d. 2018)
- Education: Grambling State University; Texas Southern University; Wesley Theological Seminary; Howard University School of Divinity
- Occupation: Minister; school principal; quartermaster engineer

Military service
- Branch/service: United States Army
- Years of service: 1942–1945
- Rank: Private
- Battles/wars: World War II; Normandy landings
- Awards: Purple Heart; World War II Victory; Legion of Honour; See full list
- Football career

Grambling State University Tigers
- Position: Running back

Awards and highlights
- 9–0 record (1942); Grambling Legends Hall of Fame

Arlester Brown (born April 1, 1924) is an American minister, educator, and U.S. Army veteran who served in France during World War II. At the age of 101, he is one of the few remaining veterans of D-Day. He has been awarded the Legion of Honour and Knight of the French Order by the French government.

== Early life ==
Arlester Brown was born on April 1, 1924, in Homer, Louisiana and grew up for a period in Shreveport, Louisiana. He attended high school in Grambling, Louisiana. His mother was a sharecropper and he spent much of his childhood being raised by his grandmother.

== Military service ==
On July 6, 1942, Brown was drafted into the U.S. Army at age 18. He attended basic training at Camp Ellis.

During his military service, Brown held the rank of private and served as a Quartermaster engineer with the 599th Quartermaster Laundry Company. He was deployed in England, Belgium, Germany, and France, where he was stationed during D-Day.

In January 1945, an unmanned V-1 flying bomb exploded near Brown and he was hit in the face by shrapnel.

Brown was honorably discharged from military service on December 28, 1945, at Camp Shelby.

== Career ==
=== College football ===
After returning home from military service, Brown attended Grambling State University on the G.I. Bill where he played on the Grambling State Tigers. He was a running back on the infamous 1942 team which was "unbeaten, untied and unscored upon" during the entire season (Eddie Robinson’s second as head coach).

=== Educator ===
Brown received a bachelor's degree in teaching education in 1949. He later earned a master's degree in education administration from Texas Southern University. Brown worked for many years in the educational system, including as a school principal in the Shreveport Public Schools. He retired from education in 1970. While a principal in Shreveport, he founded the Shreveport Teachers Association Credit Union.

=== Ministry ===
After retiring from education, he attended Wesley Theological Seminary and Howard University School of Divinity, where he graduated with a master's of divinity degree and additional theological studies. Brown served as pastor of several United Methodist churches in the Washington, D.C. metropolitan area, and was presiding elder for the Christian Methodist Episcopal Church, where he oversaw churches in Virginia, Maryland, and D.C. He has conducted mission trips in South Africa, Israel, and the Panama Canal Zone. For several years, he was chaplain and instructor at the Oak Hill Youth Prison Center, and chaplain of the Capitol Hill Hospital.

Brown was a volunteer for the 1995 White House Conference on Aging. In 1999, Brown and his wife flew on Air Force One with President Bill Clinton for the Grambling State University commencement ceremony, of which Clinton was keynote speaker.

=== Later life ===
In 2022, Brown was one of 44 veterans who returned to Normandy on a program with the Best Defense Foundation.

In 2024, Brown was a guest speaker at the 2024 American Veterans Center Conference in Washington, D.C. He was also the guest of honor for the Grambling State's "Black and Gold" spring football game.

On June 6, 2024, Brown was awarded the Legion of Honour by French President Emmanuel Macron during an international ceremony at Omaha Beach marking the 80th anniversary of D-Day.

On February 24, 2025, French President Emmanuel Macron met with Brown at the Embassy of France during his visit to Washington, D.C., and paid a public tribute to his service.

== Personal life ==
Brown was married to Ozeal Shyne Brown, who died in 2018. He currently resides at the Armed Forces Retirement Home in Washington, D.C., where he is a member of the resident board.

Brown is a member of the Mu Lambda chapter of the Alpha Phi Alpha fraternity.

== Honors and awards ==
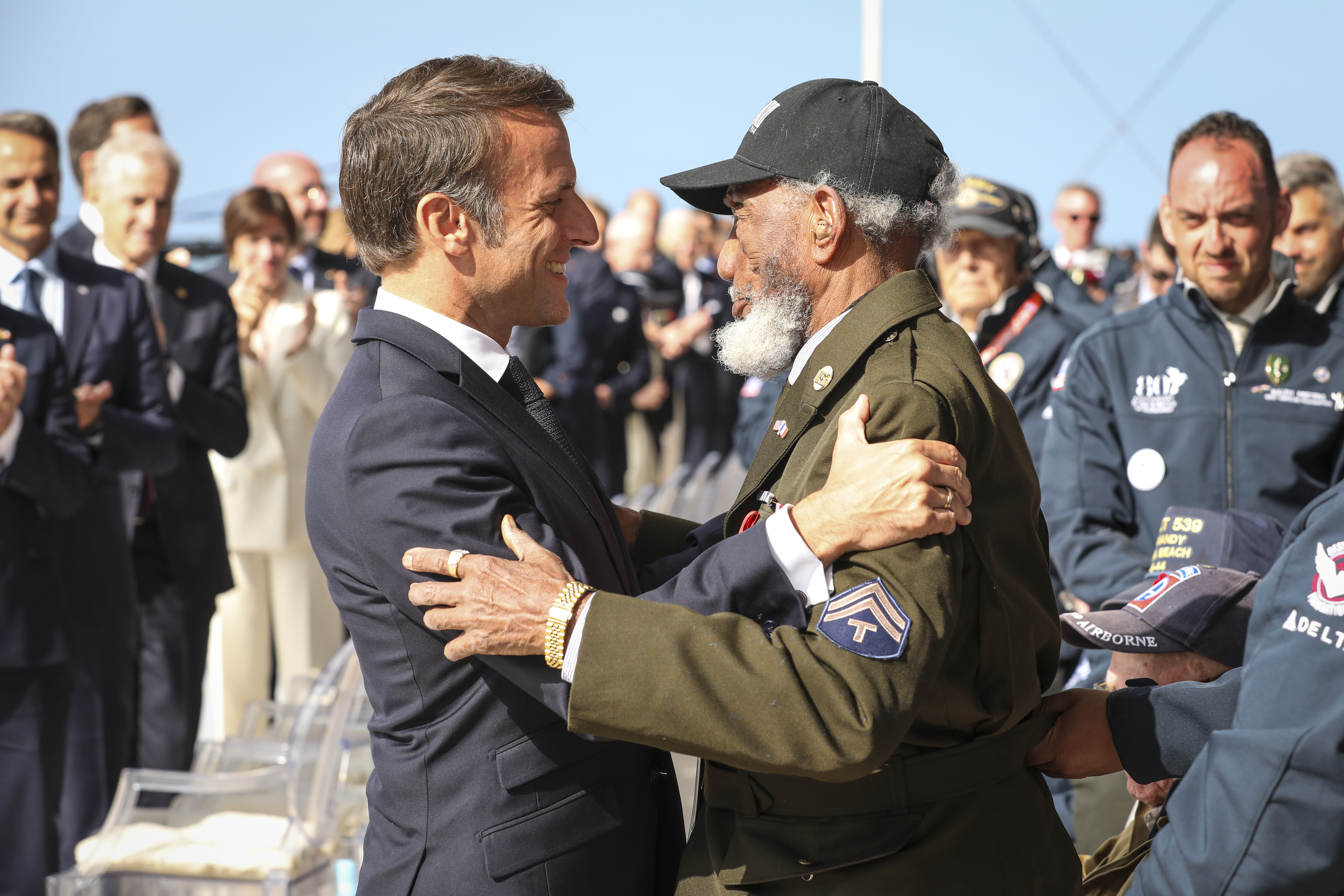
Brown being awarded the Legion of Honour by President of France Emmanuel Macron, June 6, 2024

Brown is a recipient of various U.S. and foreign military awards and honors, including the Purple Heart, World War II Victory Medal, Bronze Star Medal, Good Conduct Medal, American Campaign Medal, European–African–Middle Eastern Campaign Medal, Legion of Honour, and Knight of the French Order.

Brown is the recipient of various other awards and honors:

- Brown received an honorary Doctor of Divinity degree from the Universal Life Church.
- In 2003, Brown was inducted into the Simpson Hamline United Methodist Church's Preacher Hall of Fame.
- In 2024, Brown was inducted into the Grambling Legends Sports Hall of Fame.
- In 2024, the Grambling University National Alumni Association renamed their annual Lifetime Achievement Award in Brown's honor.
- In May 2024, Brown was selected to participate in the Flame of Liberty Ceremony at the Tomb of the Unknown Soldier at Arlington National Cemetery.
