= The Beltway Boys =

- Presented by: Mort Kondracke; Fred Barnes
- Country of origin: United States
- No. of episodes: Unknown

Production
- Running time: 30 minutes

Original release
- Network: Fox News Channel
- Release: 1998 – 2009

The Beltway Boys is an American weekly television show. The title referred to the Capital Beltway – the circumferential freeway surrounding Washington, D.C. (see Inside the Beltway) – and to the two journalists who hosted the show: Mort Kondracke and Fred Barnes. Airing initially in the United States on Saturday evenings at 6:00 pm ET on the Fox News Channel, the program was a weekly digest and discussion of political issues. The show was taped in Fox News' Washington studios on Fridays. Fox News Channel cancelled the show in April 2009.

== Overview ==
Mort Kondracke (left) and Fred Barnes (right)

Typically, the program began with three primary topics ("Hot Stories") that Kondracke and Barnes discussed at length. It then looked at newsworthy events in the political lives of national leaders in its "Ups and Downs" segment, characterizing the events as positive for the individual (up) or negative (down).
