= Radio America (United States) =

American conservative talk radio network

Radio America is an American radio network specializing in conservative-oriented talk programming. A division of the American Studies Center, the network says its mission is "to produce and syndicate quality radio programs reflecting a commitment to traditional American values, limited government and the free market."

Radio America has a roster of talk shows syndicated to hundreds of radio stations in the U.S. The company's headquarters are on North Glebe Road (Virginia State Route 120) in Arlington, Virginia, a suburb of Washington, D.C.

== Weekday shows ==
- Doctor Asa Show with Asa Andrew (Medical show)
- The Chad Benson Show (Conservative Talk)
- The Dana Show with Dana Loesch (Conservative Talk)
- What's Cooking Today with Michael Horn (Food and wine show)
- When Radio Was (Old-Time Radio episodes)

== Weekend shows ==
- The Pet Show with Warren Eckstein
- Paul Parent Garden Club
- Intelligent Medicine with Dr. Ronald Hoffman
- Tech It Out with Marc Saltzman
- The National Defense Network with Randy Miller

== Past shows ==
- Good Day with Doug Stephan
- The Drive with Adam Taylor
- The Alan Keyes Show
- What's the Story? with Fred Barnes
- Common Sense Radio with Oliver North
- Bob Barr's Laws of the Universe
- The Dr. Joy Browne Show
- The G. Gordon Liddy Show
- The Greg Knapp Experience
- Dateline Washington with Greg Corombos
- Veterans Chronicles with Gene Pell

== History ==
Radio America was founded in 1985 by its current president, James C. Roberts. In 1997, it achieved full network status, broadcasting 24 hours a day, seven days a week. Currently, Radio America distributes 17 hours of new programming each weekday. Throughout its existence, Radio America has been producing news, talk, documentary and short-features programming that has been picked up by stations around the nation. The American Studies Center has funded special broadcast projects at Radio America, such as a documentary series on African-American conservatives,

Radio America programming is delivered to radio stations via satellite. Weekdays feature mainly news and political talk shows, while weekends offer specialty programs ranging from home finance and sports to medical advice and politics.

Radio America has a sister organization, the American Veterans Center, which is also funded by the American Studies Center.

== Awards ==
In 1994, Radio America produced The Blues Story: Triumph of An American Musical Art Form, a six-part radio documentary that won a Keeping the Blues Alive Award from the Blues Foundation.

The network has won a host of other awards, including the New York International Radio Festival's Gold and Silver medals, the ABA Silver Gavel, Gabriel, Ohio State, and Freedom Foundation.
