= Worth Winning =

1989 film by Will Mackenzie

- Film poster
- Directed by: Will Mackenzie
- Screenplay by: Josann McGibbon; Sara Parriott
- Based on: Worth Winning by Dan Lewandowski
- Produced by: Gil Friesen; Dale Pollock
- Starring: Mark Harmon; Madeleine Stowe; Lesley Ann Warren; Maria Holvöe
- Cinematography: Adam Greenberg
- Edited by: Sidney Wolinsky
- Music by: Patrick Williams
- Distributed by: 20th Century Fox
- Release date: October 27, 1989 (US)
- Running time: 103 minutes
- Country: United States
- Language: English
- Box office: $3,690,400 (US)

Worth Winning is a 1989 American romantic comedy film directed by Will Mackenzie and starring Mark Harmon, Madeleine Stowe and Lesley Ann Warren. It was written by Josann McGibbon and Sara Parriott, based on the novel by Dan Lewandowski.

== Plot ==
Taylor Worth is a devastatingly handsome and charming weatherman for a Philadelphia television station. A confirmed bachelor, he sees a lot of women and gains the envy of his closest friends.

One of them, Ned Broudy, offers Taylor a wager, that he cannot get three randomly chosen women to fall in love with him over a three-month period of time and accept a proposal of marriage.

Taylor takes the bet, putting up his weekend cabin against a valuable painting that Ned and Clair Broudy own.

Clair knows nothing of the bet, so she is pleased when her husband fixes up Taylor with her friend Veronica Briskow, a concert pianist. Ned is sure that the haughty Veronica will have nothing in common with a shallow TV weatherman, but Taylor does find a way to attract her interest.

The remaining two women Taylor must persuade to fall in love with him are Erin Cooper, a sexy Philadelphia Eagles receptionist, and Eleanor Larimore, an attractive older woman. The choice of Eleanor is a dirty trick on Ned's part, inasmuch as she is already married.

Eager to teach Ned a lesson, Taylor quickly seduces Erin, then proposes marriage to her in front of a hidden TV camera. This causes jealousy in her protective friend Tarry Childs, who plays for the football team, but he wants Erin to be happy. And although Taylor doesn't have many scruples, he refuses to sleep with Erin after learning she is still a virgin.

His next mission is Eleanor. It turns out she is unsatisfied at home and a willing participant when Taylor flirts with her while posing as a shoe salesman, engaging him in dangerous sex in public places. She, too, accepts Taylor's secretly filmed marriage proposal—two down and one to go.

Veronica won't be easy. She is career-minded and not eager for marriage. Plus the sex between her and Taylor is surprisingly disappointing so far.

The more time they spend together, though, Taylor realizes he doesn't want to lose Veronica after the wager is won. He proposes at his cabin and she accepts. Clair is delighted, Ned devastated.

Then the real trouble begins. Taylor first needs to break it off with Erin, disappointing her desire to start a family, which he does by pretending to be impotent. Eleanor, alas, is enjoying her improved sex life and brags about it to Clair and Veronica.

It becomes clear that three women are seeing the same man. Taylor is dumped by his fiancées. Erin finds solace in the arms of her football player while Eleanor takes pleasure in Taylor's humiliation at being exposed for what he really is, but Veronica is genuinely heartbroken.

A broken man, Taylor tells his friend Ned to forget the bet. As a grand gesture, he makes a public apology to Veronica at a benefit auction in a giant hall, expressing his love and his desire to be with her for everybody to hear.

== Cast ==
- Mark Harmon as Taylor Worth
- Madeleine Stowe as Veronica Briskow
- Lesley Ann Warren as Eleanor Larimore
- Maria Holvöe as Erin Cooper
- Mark Blum as Ned Broudy
- Andrea Martin as Clair Broudy
- Tony Longo as Terry Childs
- Alan Blumenfeld as Howard Larimore
- Brad Hall as Eric
- Jon Korkes as Sam
- Arthur Malet as Ticket Taker
- Joan Severance as Lizbette
- David Brenner as Charity Ball Auctioneer
- Devin Ratray as Howard Larimore Jr.

== Critical reception ==
Janet Maslin of The New York Times does not write negatively about the acting but closes her review with the following about the direction and writing:

The screenplay, by Josann McGibbon and Sara Parriott, is sometimes a shade funnier than Will Mackenzie's direction, which is phenomenally flat. Mr. Mackenzie's idea of wit is to load the film with carrots, cigars and many other phallic objects, most of which get clipped or chopped. If Freud were here, he'd sue.
