= Morton Kondracke =

American political commentator and journalist

- Born: Morton Matt Kondracke; April 28, 1939 (age 87); Chicago, Illinois, U.S.
- Education: Dartmouth College (BA); Georgetown University (MA)
- Occupations: Journalist, political commentator
- Spouses: Millicent Martinez (m. 1967; died 2004) Marguerite Sallee (m. 2006)
- Children: 2
- Website: http://rollcall.com

Morton Matt Kondracke (/kənˈdræki/; born April 28, 1939) is an American journalist and political commentator. He became well known due to a long stint as a panelist for the television series The McLaughlin Group. Kondracke worked for several major publications, serving for twenty years as executive editor and columnist for the non-partisan Capitol Hill newspaper Roll Call. He was also co-host of the series The Beltway Boys of Fox News Channel and was a regular nightly contributor to the series Special Report with Brit Hume and Special Report with Bret Baier.

== Professional career ==
Kondracke was born in Chicago, Illinois, the son of Matthew Kondracke and Genevieve Marta (née Abrams). His father was of Polish ancestry, while his maternal grandfather was from a Jewish family. Kondracke graduated from Joliet Township High School in 1956, and from Dartmouth College in 1960. While at Dartmouth, he majored in English and was president of the college newspaper The Dartmouth. Kondracke was a board member of the Dartmouth Alumni Magazine and served as his class secretary. Later he received a Daniel Webster Award for Public Service from the Dartmouth Club of Washington.

After college, Kondracke joined the U.S. Army and served in Washington, DC in the Counter Intelligence Corps while pursuing graduate work at Georgetown University and working part-time for the newspaper Washington Star. After quitting the Army in 1963, Kondracke joined the staff of the Chicago Sun-Times, transferring to the paper's Washington bureau in 1968, eventually becoming White House correspondent in 1974. In that role, his name was on the master list of Nixon political opponents. He was a Nieman Fellow at Harvard University in 1973–74.

Kondracke quit the Sun-Times in 1977 to become executive editor of the news magazine The New Republic. He worked there until 1985, when he quit to become Washington bureau chief for the magazine Newsweek. In the meantime, his increasing renown resulted in his becoming a commentator for National Public Radio, This Week with David Brinkley and The Wall Street Journal.

In 1982, Kondracke joined The McLaughlin Group as one of the original panelists, a job he held for 16 years. Moderator John McLaughlin consistently teased him by pronouncing his name "more-TAHN", emphasizing the second syllable, and when guest panelist Mortimer Zuckerman appeared with Kondracke on the show as he did several times, McLaughlin would claim to be "MORT-ified".

For the US's 1984 presidential election, he was a panelist for the second televised debate (concerning foreign policy) between President Ronald Reagan and Democratic challenger Walter Mondale. During the campaign Kondracke praised Reagan for economic recovery and his policies regarding the Cold War, but called Reaganism "an amalgam of tactics, public relations, virulent anti-Sovietism, and institutionalized selfishness that will do nothing to deal with real-world economic and geopolitical realities" and predicted that Reagan would cause "depression, social chaos, and war" if reelected.

In a newspaper column published in September 1985, Kondracke stated that more Republicans should favor emergency contraception and civil unions for same-sex couples, and that Republicans should stop relying on "gay-bashing" to win elections.

In 1991, Kondracke began serving as executive editor of Roll Call, retiring in 2011. During this time he wrote a twice-weekly column for Roll Call ("Pennsylvania Avenue") that was syndicated by Newspaper Enterprise Association, part of United Media. After resigning as executive editor he remained with Roll Call as contributing editor.

External videos
- Washington Journal interview with Kondracke and Fred Barnes on Jack Kemp: The Bleeding-Heart Conservative Who Changed America, October 8, 2015, C-SPAN

In October 1998, Kondracke began co-hosting his own television series, The Beltway Boys, with Fred Barnes, for the Fox News Channel. He was also a regular nightly contributor to Special Report with Brit Hume on the same network. In 2010, he became the main interviewer for the Jack Kemp Foundation's Oral History Project, performing more than 100 interviews with teammates, colleagues, staff members and family of the late Representative, presidential and vice-presidential candidate and Secretary of Housing and Urban Development. Kondracke was the Jack Kemp Professor of Political Economy in the John W. Kluge Center at the Library of Congress from September 2011 to June 2012, where he researched and wrote about "the late Jack Kemp's congressional career, his leadership role during the Reagan Era, his presidential campaign and his influence on the Republican Party and the nation".

In the 1996 science fiction movie Independence Day, Kondracke appears at the beginning of the movie as part of The McLaughlin Group, speaking about the ineffectual policies of President Thomas J. Whitmore (Bill Pullman) and saying, "Leadership as a pilot in the Gulf War has no relationship to political leadership. It's a different animal." Kondracke also appeared in the 1993 film Dave. Kondracke was supportive of the NATO bombing of Yugoslavia and referred to the Serbs as "bastards" on national television.

For his correct prediction of the Democratic takeover of Congress he won The Washington Post's Crystal Ball Tournament of Champions Award in 2006.

Kondracke appeared on C-SPAN in July 2017, calling for a revival of the "political center" in America.

== Personal life ==
In 1967, Kondracke married Millicent Martinez, a half Mexican, half Jewish liberal activist. They had two daughters, Alexandra (a movie-maker) and Andrea (a medical doctor).

His daughter Alexandra is partners with American movie and television director and moviemaker Angela Robinson. In 2009, Alexandra gave birth to her first child, Diego.

Kondracke struggled with alcoholism during the 1980s, and he credits Millicent for helping him end his addiction by 1987. In 1988, Millicent was diagnosed with Parkinson's disease. Her long struggle with the disease prompted Kondracke to become an advocate for Parkinson's disease research and for increased government spending for medical research. Millicent Kondracke grew increasingly incapacitated by the disease, and died on July 22, 2004.

External videos
- Booknotes interview with Kondracke on Saving Milly, June 10, 2001, C-SPAN

Kondracke detailed his family's struggle with Parkinson's in a 2001 book titled Saving Milly: Love, Politics, and Parkinson's Disease (ISBN 0-345-45197-X). The book was the basis of a CBS television movie named Saving Milly, featuring Madeleine Stowe and Bruce Greenwood, which was broadcast on March 13, 2005.

On May 6, 2006, Kondracke married Marguerite Sallee, CEO of America's Promise. He is a trustee of Dartmouth College, a board member of the Parkinson's Action Network and a member of the Founders Council of the Michael J. Fox Foundation for Parkinson's Research.

== Works ==
- Saving Milly: Love, Politics, and Parkinson's Disease, PublicAffairs, 2001, ISBN 9781586480370
- Enough Already, PublicAffairs, 2007, ISBN 9781586484859
- Morton Kondracke, Fred Barnes, Jack Kemp: The Bleeding-Heart Conservative Who Changed America, Penguin, 2015, ISBN 9780698174993
