= Amazons (1984 film) =

- VHS box cover
- Genre: Crime; Drama; Thriller
- Screenplay by: David Solomon
- Story by: David Solomon; Guerdon Trueblood
- Directed by: Paul Michael Glaser
- Starring: Jennifer Warren; Peter Scolari; Madeleine Stowe; Jack Scalia; Tamara Dobson; Stella Stevens; Leslie Bevis
- Theme music composer: Basil Poledouris
- Country of origin: United States
- Original language: English

Production
- Executive producer: David Levinson
- Producer: Stuart Cohen
- Production locations: California; Washington, D.C.
- Cinematography: Dean Cundey
- Editor: Patrick Kennedy
- Running time: 98 minutes
- Production company: ABC Circle Films

Original release
- Network: ABC
- Release: January 29, 1984

Amazons is an American made-for-television thriller film, first aired on ABC on January 29, 1984. The film was directed by Paul Michael Glaser and starred Madeleine Stowe.

== Plot ==
Dr. Sharon Fields is framed for malpractice following the death of a patient, an influential congressman, and uncovers the existence of a secret cult of "Amazons" who assassinate powerful men.

== Cast ==
- Madeleine Stowe as Dr. Sharon Fields
- Jennifer Warren as Dr. Diane Cosgrove
- Tamara Dobson as Rosalund Joseph
- Jack Scalia as Lt. Tony Monaco
- Stella Stevens as Kathryn Lundquist
- William Schallert as Congressman Stanford Barstow
- Nicholas Pryor as Dr. Thompson
- Peter Scolari as Dr. Jerry Menzies
- Leslie Bevis as Vivian Todd
- Jordan Charney as Congressman Harris Stowe
- Greg Monaghan as James
- Stephen Shellen as Kevin
- Hansford Rowe as Price

== See also ==
- List of American films of 1984
