= Fred Barnes (journalist) =

American political commentator (born 1943)

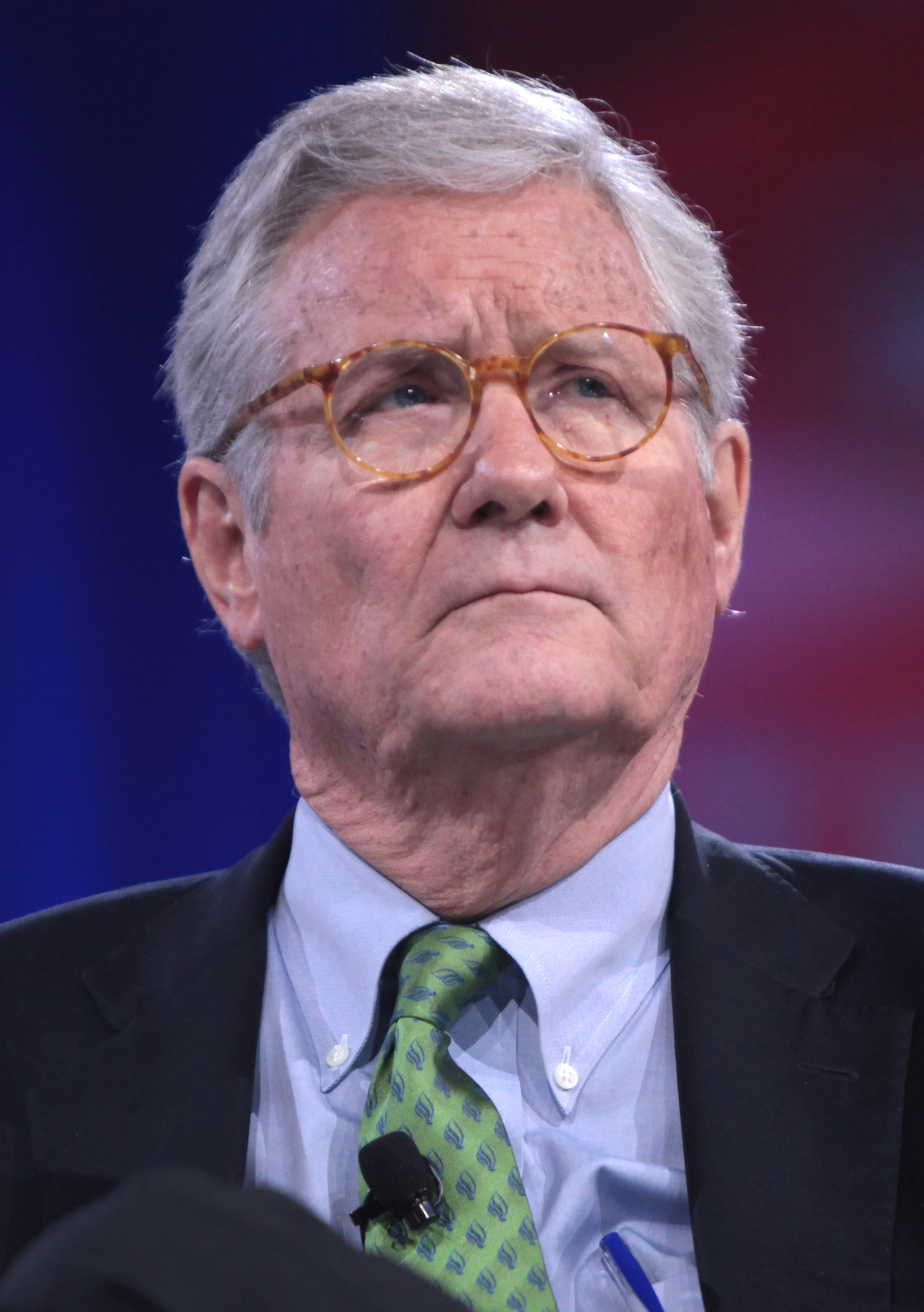
- Barnes at CPAC, March 2016
- Born: Frederic Wood Barnes Jr. February 1, 1943 (age 83); West Point, New York, U.S.
- Education: University of Virginia (BA)
- Occupations: Journalist; Political commentator
- Spouse: Barbara Beatty (m. 1967)
- Children: 4

Frederic Wood Barnes Jr. (born February 1, 1943) is an American political commentator. He was the executive editor of the defunct news publication The Weekly Standard and regularly appears on the Fox News Channel program Special Report with Bret Baier. He was previously co-host of The Beltway Boys with Mort Kondracke, which previously aired on the Fox News Channel. Barnes remains a prolific writer on presidential and many other political topics as well.

== Early life and education ==
Barnes was born in West Point, New York. He earned a B.A. degree from the University of Virginia in 1965.

== Career ==
After spending several years as a journalist with The Charleston News and Courier in Charleston, South Carolina, he became a reporter for the Washington Star. He covered the Supreme Court and the White House for the Star before moving to the Baltimore Sun, where he was the national political correspondent.

From 1985 to 1995, he was senior editor and White House correspondent for The New Republic. He also wrote the "Presswatch" media column for the American Spectator. He was a panelist on the public affairs show The McLaughlin Group from 1985 to 1998, where he was often referred to by the show's host as Freddy "the Beadle" Barnes. Barnes hosted the radio show What's the Story for Radio America. He is currently a moderator for the Voice of America show Issues in the News.

In 1984, Barnes was chosen to be one of three panelists quizzing then-President Ronald Reagan and challenger Walter Mondale in the first nationally televised debate of the 1984 presidential campaign.

Barnes has made cameo appearances in the Hollywood films Dave, Getting Away with Murder, and Independence Day. He has thrown out the first pitch for a Boston Red Sox baseball game at Fenway Park.

In 2006 Barnes wrote a favorable biography of President George W. Bush titled Rebel in Chief. Reviewing it in The Washington Monthly, Isaac Chotiner called it "fawning and at times unintentionally amusing", revealing its author as a "perfect Bush hack". He is a member of the board of the Institute on Religion and Democracy. As a member of The Falls Church, he and his family voted to disaffiliate the congregation from the Episcopal Church in the United States of America. He is a member of the board of trustees of The Fund for American Studies, in which he also serves as a senior fellow.

In the days leading up to the 2008 United States election, Barnes was the only political pundit out of 27 catalogued by the Huffington Post (including Karl Rove, Alex Castellanos, Matthew Dowd, Ed Rollins, and George Will) to predict a John McCain victory for U.S. President (286 to 252 electoral votes).

== Personal life ==
Barnes married Barbara Beatty in 1967. The couple has four children.
