= American Veterans Center =

American non-profit organization

- Formation: 1996
- Type: nonprofit organization
- Purpose: preserve and promote the legacy of America’s servicemen and women of every generation
- Headquarters: Arlington County, Virginia
- Website: https://americanveteranscenter.org/

The American Veterans Center is a non-profit educational organization and one of two programs of the American Studies Center. The mission of the American Veterans Center is "to preserve and promote the legacy of America’s servicemen and women of every generation".

The American Studies Center has funded numerous events and projects at the American Veterans Center such as; the National Memorial Day Parade, the Annual Veterans Day weekend conference and awards banquet, a quarterly publication (American Valor Quarterly), two different hour-long radio programs (Veterans Chronicles and Proudly We Hail), Wounded Warrior dinners and receptions for veterans recovering at Walter Reed and Bethesda Naval Hospitals, The Andrew J. Goodpaster Lecture, and the conducting of oral history interviews of veterans from all conflicts and archiving their self-published books and journals, photographs, maps, and supplies.

== History ==
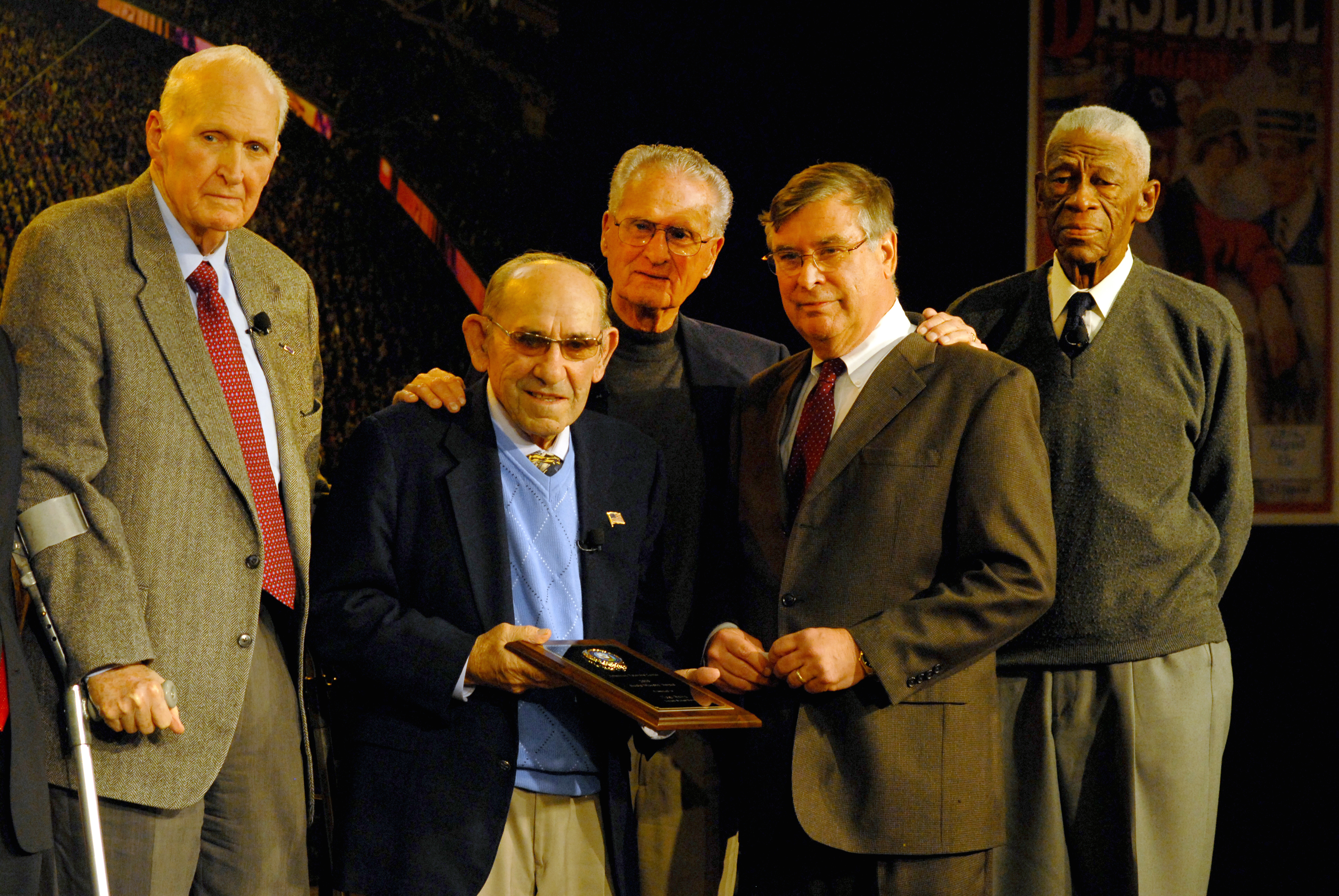
November 5, 2010: Four of Major League Baseball's greatest players gathered at Nationals Park to be honored for their service in World War II. American Veterans Center President James C. Roberts, center-right, presented Hall of Fame catcher Yogi Berra, center-left, with the 2010 Audie Murphy Award for his Navy service. Also attending was pitcher Lou Brissie, left, second baseman Jerry Coleman, center, and outfielder John "Mule" Miles, right.

The American Veterans Center is an outgrowth of the World War II Veterans Committee which itself grew out of World War II Chronicles, a weekly radio series co-produced by Radio America (the other program of the American Studies Center) and the National Archives. The World War II Veterans Committee was founded in 1996, and was responsible for several activities and projects including an annual Chesty Puller Award and an Audie Murphy Award. The Committee's motto was "From the Greatest Generation to the Latest Generation", and most of its activities focused on educating America's youth about the legacy of the World War II generation.

In 2005, the National Vietnam Veterans Committee was formed to pursue a parallel education mission for America's Vietnam veterans, and in 2006, both organizations were combined under the umbrella of the American Veterans Center, with the mission of honoring the service of all America's Veterans "From World War II to Operation Iraqi Freedom," as well as active duty personnel. Since then, the American Veterans Center has seen significant growth and has produced and sponsored numerous events and panels including the 2008 rededication of "Trimble Field" at Yona, Guam, in honor of Jimmie Trimble (James Thimble III), a Marine who was killed during the Battle of Iwo Jima after he had served on Guam and played baseball there as a star pitcher for the 3rd Marine Division (in 1944, Guam became the baseball hub in the Pacific for morale building during the war):

- American Valor Quarterly – A quarterly publication produced by the American Veterans Center with stories written by distinguished veterans and military historians.
- American Veterans Conference – Annually on Veterans Day Weekend in Washington D.C.
- Andrew J. Goodpaster Lecture and Prize – Annual Lecture in Washington D.C. honoring a Scholarly Veteran who has distinguished themselves on and off the battlefield.
- National Memorial Day Parade – The Nation's largest Memorial Day Parade every year on Memorial Day in Washington D.C.
- Proudly We Hail – A weekly radio program syndicated by Radio America airing live from 12:00 am – 1:00 am ET on Monday
- Veterans Chronicles with Gene Pell – A weekly radio program produced and syndicated by Radio America airing live from 11:00 pm – 12:00 am ET on Sunday
- Wounded Warrior dinners and receptions – Held in Washington, D.C., and focused at honoring the veterans recovering at Walter Reed and Bethesda Naval Hospital.

== National Memorial Day Parade ==
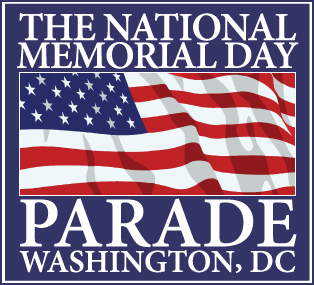
National Memorial Day Parade Logo

The National Memorial Day Parade is co-produced by the American Veterans Center and Music Celebrations International, and is held annually in Washington, D.C., every Memorial Day since 2005. The parade has been a popular destination for thousands of Americans to come together and honor the men and women who have served in uniform from the American Revolution to Operation Iraqi Freedom, and has sought to educate the public about the meaning of this hallowed day. For nearly 70 years, Washington, D.C., was without a parade on Memorial Day despite the fact that Memorial Day parades have been a tradition in cities throughout the United States for well over a century. While being the national grand parade in honor of this holiday, it is also a remembrance of the historic 1865 Grand Review of the Armies military parade. It should be considered that the first parade of 2005 was held partly as a commemoration of the 140th anniversary of the conclusion of the American Civil War and the historic Grand Review held in the national capital, as well as in honor of the diamond jubilee year of the Allied victory in the Second World War.

Ever since the American Veterans Center and Music Celebrations International started the National Memorial Day Parade, it has quickly become an event for the entire country and a major parade, which draws mainstream media attention and Hollywood stars to participate in honoring those who have died in American military service. The National Memorial Day Parade has become an event in which Americans of all ages and generations can participate. In 2006, the parade drew over 250,000 spectators and significant national media attention. The parade includes nearly 200 elements, including Government nominated marching bands, active duty and retired military units of the Armed Forces, youth groups (youth uniformed organizations inclusive), parade floats, celebrities, VIP's, as well as hundreds of veterans from World War II, Korea, Vietnam, Desert Storm, and Operations Enduring Freedom and Iraqi Freedom, together with veterans' organizations, both local and foreign, and support organizations for military families. To mark the centennial of the Australian-US military alliance, an Australian Army company marched on the parade in 2018, becoming the first foreign military contingent in the history of the parade, they returned in 2022.

Each year the parade highlights a branch of the Armed Services. The 2009 parade highlighted the U.S. Navy and featured Navy World War II veteran and actor Ernest Borgnine (McHale's Navy, 1962–66), country singer Lee Greenwood ("God Bless the USA", 1984), and actor Gary Sinise (Forrest Gump, 1994) as Honorary Marshals.

The parade is nationally-televised, live-streamed on YouTube, both of which expand the parade's reach to television and online viewers all over the world. The parade is also streamed to American Forces and Service Members stationed around the world both on Youtube and the official website of the AVC.

In May 2020, The American Veterans Center announced the cancellation of the Washington, D.C. 2020 National Memorial Day Parade due to the COVID-19 pandemic and instead would nationally broadcast a pre-recorded television special entitled, The National Memorial Day Parade: America Stands Tall. The special broadcast will return with an early weekend premiere on May 29, 2021.

The live broadcast of the annual parade resumed on May 30, 2022.

=== Notable participants ===
==== Individuals ====
- Pat Boone, Singer – Honorary Marshall
- Frank W. Buckels, Last surviving American World War I Veteran- Honorary Marshall
- Rita Cosby – Event co-host
- Adrian Cronauer, veteran and famous disc jockey portrayed by Robin Williams in the movie Good Morning, Vietnam – Parade Announcer
- Bob Feller, MLB Hall of Famer and veteran – Honored Guest
- Walker Mahurin, Colonel, WW II pilot and ace – Honored Guest
- Joe Mantegna, Actor – Honorary Marshall
- James McEachin, Actor and decorated veteran- Honorary Marshall
- Miss America, Pageant Queen- Honored Guest
- Steve Ritchie, Brigadier General, Vietnam War jet pilot ace – Honored Guest
- Mickey Rooney, Actor and Veteran- Honorary Marshall
- Edith Shain, Nurse from the famous Times Square Kiss photo (WW II) – Honored Guest
- Gary Sinise, Actor – Honorary Marshall

==== Groups ====
- Band of Brothers (Easy Company, 506th Infantry Division, 101st Airborne, WW II) – Honored Guests
- Doolittle Raiders, WW II – Honored Guests
- Flying Tigers, WW II – Honored Guests
- Pearl Harbor Survivors Association – Honored Guests
- The Tuskegee Airmen, WW II – Honored Guests
- United States Air Force Band – Honored Guests
- United States Marine Corps Band – Honored Guests
- Australian Army – Honored Guests, notable to be the first ever foreign military formation to send a contingent to the NMDP in 2018

== American Veterans Conference ==
Since 1998, the World War II Veterans Committee, and now the American Veterans Center, has brought together some of America's most distinguished veterans for an annual conference held over Veterans Day weekend, at which they share their experiences with an audience of several hundred high school and college students, as well as fellow veterans and members of the public.

The conference has been televised live on C-SPAN and covered by the national media. In addition, the conference features wreath-laying ceremonies at Washington, D.C. war memorials, private receptions for attendees with the veterans, and the annual awards banquet which honors the valor of American veterans from World War II up to the Iraq War and War in Afghanistan. The American Veterans Center's mission with the annual conference is to present American citizens with educational opportunities to learn first-hand from some of America's greatest heroes.

=== Notable participants ===
- David Bellevia, staff sergeant
- Lynn "Buck" Compton, lieutenant colonel
- Arlester Brown
- Donald Burgett
- B.G. Burkett
- Fran T. Carter
- Bruce P. Crandall, lieutenant colonel
- Adrian Cronauer
- George "Bud" Day, colonel
- Donald Dencker
- Walter Ehlers
- Bob Feller
- Joseph L. Galloway
- Andrew J. Goodpaster, general
- William "Wild Bill" Guarnere
- Edward "Babe" Heffron
- Pete Hegseth, first lieutenant
- Thomas J. Hudner Jr., captain
- Grant Ichikawa
- Bryan Jackson, captain
- Harry W.O. Kinnard, lieutenant general
- Leonard Lazarick
- Donald G. Malarkey
- Marvin Margoshes
- Marco Martinez, sergeant
- Donald Mates
- James McEachin
- Hiroshi "Hershey" Miyamura
- Harold G. "Hal" Moore Jr., lieutenant general
- Darrell "Shifty" Powers
- R. Steve Ritchie, brigadier general
- Lorraine Rodgers
- Celia Sandys
- George Joe Sakato
- Lewis Sorley
- John Robert Slaughter
- Charles "Chuck" Tatum
- Michael E. Thornton
- Renwyn Triplett
- Jack Valenti
- James A. White
- Warren Wiedhahn, colonel
- Jeremiah Workman, sergeant

== Media ==
The American Veterans Center is involved in several different forms of media and outreach; this includes Radio, Television, Video, and Print. Free internet broadcasts of both of the Veteran Center's radio programs "Veterans Chronicles"/"Proudly We Hail" and downloads of the podcast of Veterans Chronicles are available. The American Veterans Center has its own YouTube Channel with all the conference videos and event clips including parade clips from past years. The center also produces a quarterly magazine called American Valor Quarterly, which can be read online. Many of the American Veterans Center's events are broadcast live on television and covered by national print and online media.
