= Hawaii Five-0 (2010 TV series) season 10 =

Season of CBS television drama series

Hawaii Five-0
- Season 10
- United States DVD cover
- Showrunners: Peter M. Lenkov; Matt Wheeler; David Wolkove
- Starring: Alex O'Loughlin; Scott Caan; Ian Anthony Dale; Meaghan Rath; Jorge Garcia; Beulah Koale; Katrina Law; Taylor Wily; Dennis Chun; Kimee Balmilero; Chi McBride
- No. of episodes: 22

Release
- Original network: CBS
- Original release: September 27, 2019 – April 3, 2020

Season chronology
- ← Previous; Season 9

The tenth and final season of the CBS police procedural drama series Hawaii Five-0 premiered on September 27, 2019, for the 2019–20 television season. CBS renewed the series for a tenth season on May 9, 2019. The season contained 22 episodes and concluded on April 3, 2020.

The series continues to center on the Five-0 Task Force, a specialized state police task force, established by the Hawaiian Governor that investigates major crimes in the state of Hawaii including murder, terrorism, and human trafficking. All ten main cast members returned from season 9, however Jorge Garcia only appeared in one episode this season. Katrina Law was added to the main cast as Quinn Liu. Former main cast members Masi Oka and Michelle Borth guest-starred as Dr. Max Bergman and Catherine Rollins, respectively.

Four characters from Magnum P.I. guest starred in episode 12, which was a two-part crossover that concluded on Magnum P.I. As with season 9, several characters continued to make guest appearances on Magnum P.I.

The most watched episode of the season was the series finale, "Aloha", with 9.59 million viewers. The second-most-watched was the penultimate episode, "A ʻohe ia e loaʻa aku, he ulua kapapa no ka moana", with 8.44 million viewers.

== Cast and characters ==
=== Main cast ===
- Alex O'Loughlin as Lieutenant Commander Steven "Steve" McGarrett, United States Navy Reserve
- Scott Caan as Detective Sergeant Daniel "Danny" "Danno" Williams
- Ian Anthony Dale as Officer Adam Noshimuri
- Meaghan Rath as Officer Tani Rey
- Jorge Garcia as Special Consultant Jerry Ortega
- Beulah Koale as Officer Junior Reigns
- Katrina Law as Army CID Sergeant Quinn Liu, later Five-0 Task Force
- Taylor Wily as Kamekona Tupuola
- Dennis Chun as Sergeant Duke Lukela, Honolulu Police Department
- Kimee Balmilero as Dr. Noelani Cunha, Medical Examiner
- Chi McBride as Captain Lou Grover

=== Recurring ===
- Shawn Mokuahi Garnett as Flippa
- Fernando Chien as Kenji Higashi

=== Guest stars ===
- Gabriel Ellis as Roger Maliah
- Eugenia Yuan as Daiyu Mei
- Sonny Saito as Hajime Masuda
- Rob Morrow as Wes Cullen
- Joey Lawrence as Aaron Wright
- Masi Oka as Dr. Max Bergman
- Christine Lahti as Doris McGarrett
- Presilah Nunez as Dr. Emma Okino
- Meta World Peace as himself
- Cassandra Hepburn as Junior's mother
- Michelle Hurd as Renee Grover, Lou's wife
- Alon Aboutboul as Zev Shazam
- Colby Ryan McLaughlin as Luke
- Kate Siegel as Joanna Di Pietra
- Sumalee Montano as Yang
- Jack Cutmore-Scott as Gabe/Michael Blanton
- Lance Gross as Lincoln Cole, a decorated former Marine Gunnery Sergeant with the Fleet Anti-terrorism Security Team.
- Suzanne Cryer as Suzanne Ridge
- Jean Ota as Iolana Cunha
- Roy M. Balmilero as Joseph Cunha
- Enson Inoue as Etsuji
- Rodney Rowland as Oz
- Donavon Frankenreiter as himself
- Zach Sulzbach as Charlie Williams
- Brittany Ishibashi as Tamiko Masuda
- Nia Holloway as Bonnie Siobhan; Grover's niece
- Jimmy Buffett as Frank Bama
- Willie Garson as Gerard Hirsch
- Eva De Dominici as Maria
- James Marsters as Victor Hesse
- William Sadler as John McGarrett
- Mark Dacascos as Wo Fat
- Chuck Norris as Lee Phillips, a retired sergeant major who is helping his mentee; Lincoln Cole
- Michelle Borth as Catherine Rollins

=== Crossover characters ===
- Jay Hernandez as Thomas Magnum, a former Navy SEAL who is currently a security consultant
- Perdita Weeks as Juliet Higgins, a former MI6 agent who is currently a majordomo
- Zachary Knighton as Orville "Rick" Wright, a Marine veteran and former door gunner, who runs his own tiki bar
- Stephen Hill as Theodore "TC" Calvin, a Marine veteran and helicopter pilot who runs helicopter tours of Hawaii

== Episodes ==
The title of each episode is in the Hawaiian language with the English translation directly underneath.

No. overall	No. in season	Title	Directed by	Written by	Original release date	Prod. code	U.S. viewers (millions)
219	1	"Ua ʻeha ka ʻili i ka maka o ka ihe" "The skin has been hurt by the point of the spear"	Duane Clark	Story by : Peter M. Lenkov; Teleplay by : David Wolkove & Matt Wheeler	September 27, 2019	1002	7.03
In the Five-0 offices, Lou kills Azra, Omar Hassan's wife, but not before Jerry is shot by her. While recovering at a hospital, Jerry begins thinking about moving on to other things and leaves the team later. While off duty, Junior and Tani witness a murder-for-hire hit on a Chinese triad leader, but the hitman escapes. They then find out that military police officer Quinn Liu is also looking for the suspect. The team tracks a stolen car to a warehouse, but the hitman commits suicide before they can arrest him. Adam meets with Yakuza leaders to figure out who is behind the hits, but the hitman's accomplice arrives and attempts to kill Masuda, one of the leaders. Afterwards, Steve asks Quinn to pursue the case further, after no charges are pressed due to lack of evidence. Lastly, an unknown figure is seen putting a small explosive in Steve's tool box from his father. Note: This is the first episode to feature Katrina Law as a series regular and the last episode to feature Jorge Garcia as a main cast member.
220	2	"Kuipeia e ka makani apaa" "Knocked flat by the wind; sudden disaster"	Karen Gaviola	Talia Gonzalez & Bisanne Masoud	October 4, 2019	1003	6.56
Tani and Junior get inadvertently trapped while trying to save civilians inside a tunnel collapse. McGarrett discovers that the collapse was an intentional plot for Jackson Wilcox, the most notorious methamphetamine dealer outside of Mississippi, to escape. With Quinn's help, Five-0 discover that the van Wilcox was transported in belonged to the Department of Defense, but was actually used by the FBI to bring Wilcox from a safe house to treat his cancer. After a bomb is discovered in his home, McGarrett calls the bomb squad to investigate, but they don't get any clues of who could have planted it.
221	3	"E uhi ana ka wa I hala I na mea I hala" "Passing time obscures the past"	Brad Turner	Matt Wheeler & David Wolkove	October 11, 2019	1004	7.09
Five-0 investigates the murder of diver Jay Kahale who was discovered inside the wreckage of downed airliner flight 912 from 1983. The team discover conspiracy theories about the crash online. Lou and Tani talk to one member of the sites, Tim Pollock, who reveals that someone under a username has fueled conspiracies about the crash and is considered to have published about 80% of it. Quinn is arrested by military police for money-laundering after being offered to join Five-0. After McGarrett confronts Cullen, his house explodes with him inside, killing Cullen.
222	4	"Ukuli'i ka pua, onaona i ka mau'u" "Tiny is the flower, yet it scents the grasses around it"	Peter Weller	Zoe Robyn	October 18, 2019	1006	6.34
Five-0 investigates the suspicious attempted kidnapping of high-school student Yumi Chun, whom they later discover is actually a North Korean agent who was deployed to Hawaii to bring back a defector, Jae-Sung. With the help of Aaron Wright, they manage to stop Chun from releasing classified black site documents from an army general. McGarrett brings Eddie to the vet after being attacked by another dog in the dog park, and later goes on a date with the vet who treated Eddie, Emma Okino.
223	5	"He 'oi'o kuhihewa; he kaka ola i 'ike 'ia e ka makaula" "Don't blame ghosts and spirits for one's troubles; a human is responsible"	Yangzom Brauen	Rob Hanning & Zoe Robyn	October 25, 2019	1005	6.70
Halloween in Hawaii has Five-0 working two cases, a murder of an elderly woman, Edith Lahela who was murdered in an attempted robbery gone wrong and the discovery of the body of a disappearance victim, Lana Nakua. Grover, Adam, and Tani discover that Edith Lahela was a nun for over 20 years and had adopted the son of Mother Superior Decosta, Kimo, who she locked in the safe in her basement to protect him from the outside world because of his deformity. With the help of Max Bergman, who has returned for a visit from Africa with his adopted son Tunde, they get Kimo to stand down with also bringing Decosta to convince him. Steve and Junior discover that someone stole Lana Nakua's body from the morgue, and later find two of the original suspects in her case, Todd Hughes and Remy Mitchell, murdered in their homes with Nakua's initials written in blood near them. They conclude that given that the third suspect, Zach Wyatt, has not been found murdered and that he is the killer and the one who orchestrated the theft of Lana's body.
224	6	"A'ohe pau ka 'ike i ka halau ho'okahi" "All knowledge is not learned in just one school"	Karen Gaviola	Duppy Demetrius	November 1, 2019	1007	7.13
Five-0 works two cases, one of an autonomous vehicle that was carrying cocaine that was involved in a hit and run, and the second of an elderly woman murdered in her apartment. Steve, Danny, Grover, Junior, and Adam discover that the autonomous vehicles belonged to a tech company run by Julia Wahea, and whoever utilized her vehicles used her login to access them. Tani and Quinn investigate the case of the murdered elderly woman. Social media influencers Scooter and Skeez ride-along in the process of making an HPD recruitment video. Though reluctant to let them help at full scale, they allow assistance to a certain degree. Scooter and Skeez's recruitment video is later a success.
225	7	"Ka 'i'o" "DNA"	Alex O'Loughlin	Alex O'Loughlin	November 8, 2019	1001	7.13
A CIA operative meets with Five-0 and tells them that another CIA operative was found dead in Mexico with a bullet matching Doris' service issued weapon. Steve is ordered to go to Mexico alone to find her as well as kill a powerful cartel leader. Meanwhile, while in Mexico, Junior tracks Steve using security cameras and goes to assist him. After infiltrating a storage facility of the drug cartel leader Steve and Junior find Doris. However, before he can talk her into coming with them, Steve is shot and Doris is fatally stabbed by the cartel leader. It is revealed that Doris had set up the cartel leader, successfully completing a deep-cover mission for the U.S. government.
226	8	"Ne'e aku, ne'e mai ke one o Punahoa" "That way and this way shifts the sand of Punahoa"	Carlos Bernard	Chi McBride & Matt Wheeler	November 15, 2019	1008	7.36
Five-0 investigate the hijacking of a medevac helicopter. Quinn and Tani manage to track down an address from a burner phone he bought. They and Steve arrive at the address where they find DEA agent Richie Gormican, who is looking for the same culprit whose name is Ben Tam. Tam was on a small plane carrying $10 million worth of heroin, which they also learn is connected to Sam Bishop, Wes Cullen's associate. Adam and Junior, along with Eddie, search the jungle and find the plane and the heroin. McGarrett's suspicions about Gormican are proved when Five-0 learn that he was suspended by the DEA, had worked with Tam, and is in the middle of completing his drug deal with a Serbian gang. Separately, Lou's niece, Siobhan, comes to visit Hawaii to enroll for a basketball scholarship at the UH, but concerns of her past dealings with a gang in Chicago raises concerns. Lou later discovers that Siobhan had always wanted to be a cop since she was five years old and that she had saved a friend at school from a gang member, which was why she was expelled. At the hospital, Sam Bishop, who remains unconscious, is murdered.
227	9	"Ka la'au kumu 'ole o Kahilikolo" "The trunkless tree of Kahilikolo"	Ron Underwood	Paul Grellong & Noah Evslin	November 22, 2019	1010	7.33
Thanksgiving in Hawaii has Five-0 investigating the murder of philanthropist George Parks, who seemed to have fallen witness to a robbery on his own property. The case takes an odd turn when they discover that a koa tree is what was stolen. Upon arriving at the suspected address, they find the robbers dead with the wood still with them. Junior and Tani investigate a robbery at his parents' house, and discover that the robber stole his father's Purple Heart medal which he had hid. Junior suspects his childhood best friend Owen Ocampo, who is revealed to actually have done it, but didn't pawn the Purple Heart, not forgetting his friendship with Junior. He later accepts Junior's offer to go to rehab. Junior invites his parents to the Thanksgiving celebrations at McGarrett's house.
228	10	"O 'oe, a 'owau, nalo ia mea" "You and me; it is hidden"	Kristin Windell	Paul Grellong & Rob Hanning	December 6, 2019	1009	6.55
Five-0 is faced with the seemingly unconnected triple murders of a chef, boat captain, and a photographer. Upon investigation, the team deduces that the murders are connected to the murder of a banker ten years prior. Lou and Tani look into the HPD report from the banker's murder, and discover that all three victims had told the police that they never saw anything. Five-0 suspects that one of the three had gotten cold feet and wanted the truth to come out. Meanwhile, Adam and Masuda-San both work to save Tamiko, who has been kidnapped. Though Tamiko returns safely, her father is shot and dies en route for treatment. Adam confronts Kenji only for Kenji to threaten to reveal Adam's role which would see his Five-0 career ruined. Despite Adam's pleas, Kenji then murders the Filipino gang member Adam had abducted and brought to Masuda, whom Masuda-San had tortured. Horrified by the cold-blooded execution, Adam then answers a phone call from Steve and agrees to see him at the office straightaway. Unbeknown to Adam, Duke had learned that he was the one who had attacked the Filipino gang and abducted one of them, and Duke has given Steve the information.
229	11	"Ka i ka 'ino, no ka 'ino" "To return evil for evil"	Karen Gaviola	Kendall Sherwood	December 13, 2019	1011	6.57
Continuing from the previous episode, Adam arrives at the Five-0 HQ and is confronted by Steve and Duke about his involvement in the robbery of the Filipino gang. Adam hands his badge and gun, resigning from the task force and refusing to tell Steve the truth. Meanwhile, the team investigates a helicopter attack which is revealed to have been shot down by a rocket launcher. Digging deeper, they learn that the pilot and founder, Jordan Notua, had turned off the helicopter's transponder over a no-fly zone for the Hawaii state bird. Searching the area, Steve and Danny discover that someone professional has gunned down a mansion's guards and stolen hidden weapons. They learn that the suspect is Daiyu Mei, unknowingly to them that she is Wo Fat's wife, who has continued his work of selling weapons. In the real location, Mei is making a weapons sale, but turns on the buyers and shoots them. She tells the survivor that she will call an ambulance for him, provided he passes on a message to McGarrett that she is Wo Fat's wife.
230	12	"Ihea 'oe i ka wa a ka ua e loku ana?" "Where were you when the rain was pouring?"	Katie Boyum	Story by : Peter M. Lenkov; Teleplay by : David Wolkove	January 3, 2020	1013	8.06
McGarrett and the task force track down a suspect who might be connected to the stolen list of undercover CIA agents. When the suspect gets away, the task force runs into Thomas Magnum (Jay Hernandez) and his partner, Higgins (Perdita Weeks) discovering that they are looking for the same suspect for a client they are looking after. McGarrett reluctantly begins working together to try to find the stolen list. Meanwhile, Tani reaches out to Adam concerning his well-being only for Adam to flee Hawaii. Tani asks Junior out on a date. Note : This episode begins a crossover event that concludes on Magnum P.I. season 2 episode 12.
231	13	"Loa'a pono ka 'iole i ka punana" "The rat was caught right in the nest"	Antonio Negret	Kendall Sherwood & Chris Wu	January 10, 2020	1012	7.75
While on a round of golf at a luxurious country club, Grover gets roped into a murder of a man found frozen in a nitrogen cool steamer room. Grover is immediately asked to do the case quietly to not damage the club's reputation. Meanwhile, McGarrett comes to Danny's side when the latter finds out that Charlie has been getting bullied at school and not telling him. Also, Adam faces a huge decision of loyalty between Five-0 and the Yakuza. Tani receives shocking news that Junior had been recalled to active duty.
232	14	"I ho'olulu, ho'ohulei 'ia e ka makani" "There was a lull, and then the wind began to blow about"	Peter Weller	Story by : Peter M. Lenkov; Teleplay by : Paul Grellong	January 31, 2020	1014	7.56
At a local bar, Danny meets a woman, Leslie, with whom he gets to know and share few things in common with. On the way home, they encounter an oncoming car that almost collides with them, but end up crashing in the ditch after Danny tries swerving out of the way. The unnamed woman is critically injured and loses much blood. Danny tends to her wounds while also trying to flag the attention of passerby. By the time a rescue team arrives, the woman has already died. Meanwhile, Steve gets Eddie checked by the vet after he wanders into traffic. The vet concludes that Eddie is suffering from PTSD after having supposedly experienced some kind of traumatic event in his life. Steve to bring Eddie to a military doctor, who further confirms Eddie's PTSD. Steve, Quinn, and Tani start digging into Eddie's past service record with Marines who served in Afghanistan. They learn that Eddie had watched his original handler getting killed by a bomb and a sort of purple flowers in the grass had triggered him. In the midst of everything, Adam makes his return to Hawaii.
233	15	"He waha kou o ka he'e" "Yours is the mouth of an octopus"	Ian Anthony Dale	Matt Wheeler & Chi McBride	February 7, 2020	1015	6.69
Following his car accident, Danny meets Leslie, Joanna's sister (the woman he met in the previous episode), and apologizes to her, but she doesn't blame him for her death and reassures him that he did everything he could. Tani stands in as an instructor at the HPD academy but is also checking on Siobhan, Grover's niece. After shooting practice, Siobhan expresses to Tani that she thinks her boyfriend, fellow recruit Endo Tanaka, is cheating on her and that he has two phones. That night, Siobhan drives to Endo's house, but he tells her he is out with a friend. Regardless, Siobhan decides to investigate the house and overhears Endo speaking to a Yakuza member, before getting revealed and kidnapped. Five-0 investigate Siobhan's kidnapping, subsequently having HPD intercept Endo after he is told by Kenji Higashi to continue his day as normal. Grover doesn't believe Endo's story about Siobhan supposedly committed suicide. Realizing he put himself in a bad situation, Adam decides to do good by exchanging Endo for Siobhan with the Yakuza.
234	16	"He kauwa ke kanaka na ke aloha" "Man is a slave of love"	Jerry Levine	Rob Hanning	February 14, 2020	1016	6.95
Valentine's Day has Five-0 investigate the murder of Thai diplomat Prin Khomsiri who was allegedly killed by his own wife, Lorena Massey who confessed to the murder and is brought into HPD custody. Danny doubts that she actually committed the murder, citing his prior experience with domestic abuse cases to back him. The case gets more complicated as the State Department gets involved and wants to keep the case out of the public spotlight. Documents from the State Department reveals that Lorena's citizenship has been revoked and is due to be sent to Thailand for a trial for her husband's murder. McGarrett and Five-0 remain convinced that Lorena didn't kill her husband, and Danny brings her to a safe house owned by Kamekona, but the State Department gets to them and has him and Lorena arrested. In other matters, Noelani and Tani are taken hostage at a convenience store when a Bonnie and Clyde couple attempt a robbery. However, the man collapses after having a seizure, and Noelani assist medically and Tani manages to convince the wife to surrender for the sake of her husband getting proper medical treatment.
235	17	"He kohu puahiohio i ka ho'olele i ka lepo i luna" "Like a whirlwind, whirling the dust upward"	Karen Gaviola	Paul Grellong & Matt Wheeler	February 21, 2020	1017	6.66
Five-0 investigates a series of murders that are tied to an unpublished manuscript for the last Deerdie Naismith novel by Maureen Townsend. All of the crime scenes are replicated according to the manuscript, and Five-0 is assisted by Maureen Townsend expert Suzane Ridge (Suzanne Cryer). After inspecting a pen owned by Ridge, McGarrett finds a tracker inside it and the team digs into an event in Minneapolis that Ridge attended, where she got the pen from a fellow Maureen Townsend fan, Colin Hansen. Hansen is however, revealed to be the third victim, and McGarrett and Danny discover that Ridge is the fourth victim after they find her submerged in her hotel bathtub. Junior returns from his duty abroad and starts a relationship with Tani. They assist Harry Langford (Chris Vance) after his public actor Gabe is kidnapped. The kidnappers want to transfer Langdon's 10 million dollars to their account in the Cayman Islands. Also, Adam expresses worry to Kenji after Endo and Haru go missing. Kenji doesn't offer him much, other than that they were both sent on a plane back to Japan. While Adam discovers that Kenji had both Endo and Haru killed, masked men prepare to enter his apartment complex.
236	18	"Nalowale i ke 'ehu o he kai" "Lost in the sea sprays"	Tate Donovan	Story by : Zoe Robyn; Teleplay by : Talia Gonzalez & Bisanne Masoud	February 28, 2020	1018	6.81
Continuing from the previous episode, Adam shoots Kenji's men as they enter his apartment and Lou arrives with a SWAT team soon afterwards. Adam tells Lou that he has key evidence that will bring the Hawaiian faction of the Yakuza to justice. With help from Lou and Junior, Adam is able to arrest Kenji. With assistance from Rick Wright (Zachary Knighton), Five-0 investigates the murder of a captain onboard a cargo ship after it was boarded by pirates. When they reach the pirates' base of operations, they find them dead after having taken an unknown substance disguised as heroin. Also, in Maui, Noelani enlists the help of Quinn when she suspects that her uncle Akumu did not die of a heart attack after discovering a rash on one of his arms that indicate carbon dioxide poisoning. She and Quinn learn that Eke Mohoe had asked the coroner to report that Noelani's uncle died of a heart attack to not bring shame to the kids he (Akumu) helped out from gangs. However, one of the kids tells them that Councilman Mikala was behind it all, and Noelani deduces that he killed her uncle to eliminate him as a threat to his illegal dealings.
237	19	"E ho'i na keiki oki uaua o na pali" "Home go the very tough lads of the hills"	Geoff Shotz	Noah Evslin & Rob Hanning	March 6, 2020	1020	6.98
Five-0 investigates the murder of rancher Daniel Kalakua after he was dragged by horses across his field. They later discover that he was murdered after he uncovered human skeletons on his property. The remains are revealed to be those of the previous owners, who were buried with gold coins. McGarrett deduces this was why their murdered rancher was celebrating at the local bar because he had finally discovered gold to pay his debt. Meanwhile, Quinn's former stepdaughter, Olivia (Siena Agudong), reaches out to her for help after her father doesn't come home. Quinn enlists Adam and Kamekona's help to find her ex-husband Jake, who is known to go out gambling. Quinn and Adam find Jake at another gambling location, where Quinn has him arrested for illegal gambling and threatens to revoke his custody of Olivia.
238	20	"He puhe'e miki" "A gripping cuttlefish"	Andi Armaganian	Kendall Sherwood & Chris Wu	March 13, 2020	1019	7.11
The Five-0 team investigates a robbery-turned-murder of Chicago tourist Greg Dean, whose car was stolen. They discover that the theft of the car is reminiscent of the "Fix-a-Flat" robberies, which had the robbers steal tourists' rental vehicles from Honolulu Airport. They conclude that their robbers utilized the same strategy, but are puzzled because the theft was allegedly committed to stealing Dean's wife's ring after they find her in the woods nearby. They later learn that Greg Dean was protecting a suitcase before he was killed when they find it in their perpetrators' house. It is revealed that a Samoan gang was after Dean's suitcase and that they have his wife, Cynthia. Meanwhile, Tani helps Gerard Hirsch when it appears his uncle has committed a murder. Determined that his uncle is innocent, Hirsch almost gives in when his uncle's friend, who dealt with pawning, reveals that he knew that Tabitha May's housekeeper was shot in the eye, something that only the police and killer would know. Also, McGarrett receives a call informing him his mother hired an English lawyer to hand-deliver a package to him four months after her death.
239	21	"A ʻohe ia e loaʻa aku, he ulua kapapa no ka moana" "He cannot be caught for he is an ulua fish of the deep ocean"	Roderick Davis	Peter M. Lenkov & David Wolkove	March 27, 2020	1021	8.44
Continuing from the previous episode, the English lawyer arrives in Hawaii and makes his visit short by handing McGarrett the "package" that Doris left for him, which is a letter containing a cipher. McGarrett and the Five-0 task force investigate a botched home invasion/attempted kidnapping, where a good samaritan stepped in and killed one of the robbers and saved a mother and her son. The case takes a dramatic turn when the good samaritan, Lincoln Cole, who stopped the robbers, turns out to be an ex-marine gone AWOL. The brother of the deceased robber, Hector Acosta, seeks revenge on Cole for his brother's murder, and has the mother and son that he rescued earlier, recaptured in exchange for himself. Cole is taken into Five-0 custody for his own protection, and McGarrett learns why he went AWOL. Meanwhile, Danny and Tani are worried about McGarrett after he received the cipher from Doris. On the other hand, McGarrett contemplates leaving Five-0.
240	22	"Aloha" "Goodbye"	Duane Clark	Story by : Peter M. Lenkov; Teleplay by : David Wolkove & Matt Wheeler	April 3, 2020	1022	9.59
Steve and Lincoln head to meet Marshall, the guy Lincoln got to solve the cipher, Danny calls Steve and says that someone is tailing him. The two go to assist and when they find Danny's car, they find he has been kidnapped. Daiyu Mei contacts Steve and says she will trade the cipher for Danny's life. Steve meets Daiyu Mei and gives her the cipher, in exchange he gets the address of Danny's location. Danny breaks free but is shot on his way out. Five-0 rushes Danny to the hospital. Lincoln finds out the cipher were coordinates which Steve recognizes to be the grave of Doris when she faked her death. Five-0 finds that the grave was full of cash and Daiyu Mei's associates emptied it out. Facial recognition allows Five-0 to track their location. Daiyu Mei is ultimately arrested. It is revealed that Steve is leaving the island, Steve and Danny share their goodbyes. Steve says bye to Eddie and the rest of Five-0 shows up to say goodbye. Steve puts Lincoln in charge of the Five-0 task force before leaving. Catherine Rollins joins Steve on the plane and reveals she is the one who solved the cipher.

== Production ==
=== Development ===
On May 9, 2019, CBS renewed the series for a tenth season. CBS announced its fall schedule on May 15, 2019, and it was revealed that the series would undergo a time slot change, with the series being replaced by Magnum P.I. at its previous time slot, and the series now airing an hour earlier, holding the time slot formerly held by MacGyver which moved to mid-season. When interviewed about possible story lines for the tenth season, executive producer Peter M. Lenkov stated, "We're playing it real, with the real things that happen in people's lives as time marches on". CBS revealed its fall premiere dates on June 12, 2019, and announced that the season would premiere on September 27, 2019. Series star Alex O'Loughlin wrote the first filmed episode of the season. On February 14, 2020, it was announced that the season would conclude with a two-part season finale on April 3. It was later revealed this would be the series finale. The decision was based on several factors, most notably O'Loughlin's recovery from on-set injuries and contracts that were set to end this season. CBS had hoped to continue the Danno character in a sequel or continuation, but the producers decided not to go with the idea. As a result of the COVID-19 pandemic the NCAA announced that March Madness 2020 would be cancelled. Following this announcement, on March 13, 2020, CBS announced that with the timeslot being opened up the series finale would be split into two parts, the first part airing on March 27, with the second part airing on April 3, but keeping the series' regular timeslot.

=== Filming ===
Early filming for the season began on July 2, 2019, in Los Angeles, California. Filming officially began in Hawaii on July 18 with a traditional Hawaiian blessing. O'Loughlin also directed the first episode filmed. Primary filming for the series continued to take place in Honolulu, Hawaii, on the island of Oahu. The series had a sound stage at Hawaii Film Studio in Diamond Head where it filmed various indoor scenes. Exterior shots and outdoor scenes for McGarrett's house were filmed at the Bayer Estate in ʻĀina Haina.

=== Casting ===
On July 20, 2019, Christine Lahti announced that she would be returning as McGarrett's mom Doris McGarrett as a guest star in an episode. On August 14, 2019, it was announced that Katrina Law was joining the main cast as Quinn Liu, a former staff sergeant with Army CID recently demoted for insubordination.

On September 27, 2019, Jorge Garcia, who had played Jerry Ortega since the fourth season, left the series following the season premiere to focus on other projects; in the show, after recovering from being shot in the ninth season finale, Jerry leaves the task force to focus on writing a book. Garcia and producer Peter Lenkov both confirmed the former's exit, but assured that the door would be open for Jerry to later return as a guest star. Garcia is set to cross-over onto one of Lenkov's other series MacGyver during its fifth season portraying Jerry Ortega as a guest star. MacGyver previously crossed-over with Hawaii Five-0 in their first and seventh seasons, respectively.

On February 14, 2020, it was revealed that Lance Gross would have a major guest role for the two-part season finale with the possibility for Gross to become a series regular pending renewal of an eleventh season. However, on February 28, 2020, it was announced that the series would end after the tenth season. Chuck Norris made a cameo appearance in the season's penultimate episode as Lee Phillips, a retired sergeant major who is helping his mentee; Lincoln Cole. Former main cast member Michelle Borth returned in the final moments of the series finale as Catherine Rollins; however, her appearance was not mentioned in any press releases put out prior to the episodes airing. To avoid any spoiler she was also not included in the opening guest star credits. Instead, she appeared in the closing credits within her own caption.

== Viewing figures ==
№	Episode	Air date	18-49 rating	Viewers (millions)	Live+7 18-49	Live+7 viewers (millions)
1	Ua 'eha ka 'ili i ka maka o ka ihe	September 27, 2019	0.7	7.03	1.2	9.72
2	Kuipeia e ka makani apaa	October 4, 2019	0.7	6.56	—N/a	8.91
3	E uhi ana ka wa I hala I na mea I hala	October 11, 2019	0.7	7.09	—N/a	9.39
4	Ukuli'i ka pua, onaona i ka mau'u	October 18, 2019	0.6	6.34	1.0	8.54
5	He 'oi'o kuhihewa; he kaka ola i 'ike 'ia e ka makaula	October 25, 2019	0.7	6.70	1.0	8.99
6	A'ohe pau ka 'ike i ka halau ho'okahi	November 1, 2019	0.7	7.13	1.1	9.48
7	Ka 'i'o	November 8, 2019	0.7	7.13	—N/a	9.44
8	Ne'e aku, ne'e mai ke one o Punahoa	November 15, 2019	0.7	7.36	1.1	9.66
9	Ka la'au kumu 'ole o Kahilikolo	November 22, 2019	0.8	7.33	1.2	9.77
10	O 'oe, a 'owau, nalo ia mea	December 6, 2019	0.6	6.55	1.1	8.86
11	Ka i ka 'ino, no ka 'ino	December 13, 2019	0.6	6.57	1.0	8.82
12	Ihea 'oe i ka wa a ka ua e loku ana?	January 3, 2020	0.9	8.06	1.4	10.57
13	Loa'a pono ka 'iole i ka punana	January 10, 2020	0.8	7.75	1.1	9.88
14	I ho'olulu, ho'ohulei 'ia e ka makani	January 31, 2020	0.7	7.56	1.1	9.80
15	He waha kou o ka he'e	February 7, 2020	0.7	6.69	1.1	9.42
16	He kauwa ke kanaka na ke aloha	February 14, 2020	0.7	6.95	1.1	9.71
17	He kohu puahiohio i ka ho'olele i ka lepo i luna	February 21, 2020	0.6	6.66	1.1	9.60
18	Nalowale i ke 'ehu o he kai	February 28, 2020	0.7	6.81	1.1	9.55
19	E ho'i na keiki oki uaua o na pali	March 6, 2020	0.6	6.98	1.1	9.65
20	He puhe'e miki	March 13, 2020	0.7	7.11	1.2	10.05
21	A 'ohe ia e loa'a aku, he ulua kapapa no ka moana	March 27, 2020	0.9	8.44	1.4	11.08
22	Aloha	April 3, 2020	0.9	9.59	1.4	12.14

== Home media ==
Hawaii Five-0: The Final Season
Set details	Special features	
22 episodes; 5-disc set; 16:9 aspect ratio; English (Dolby Digital, 5.1 with subtitles)	"Desperate Measures" (Magnum P.I. crossover episode); Shorelines: Aloha; Reflection on Five-0: An Interview with Alex O'Loughlin; Gag Reel; Deleted/Extended Scenes	
DVD release dates
Region 1	Region 2	Region 4
July 28, 2020	Sept 14, 2020	
