= Aloha (Hawaii Five-0) =

- Hawaii Five-0 episode
- Episode no.: Season 10; Episode 22
- Directed by: Duane Clark
- Story by: Peter M. Lenkov
- Teleplay by: David Wolkove and Matt Wheeler
- Production code: 1022
- Original air date: April 3, 2020

Guest appearances
- Lance Gross as Lincoln Cole; Eugenia Yuan as Daiyu Mei; William Sadler as John McGarrett; James Marsters as Victor Hesse; Mark Dacascos as Wo Fat; Michael Hagiwara as Ryo; Amelia Cooke as Lead Doctor; Robert Law as Nurse; Geraldo Morales as Airline Passenger; Michelle Borth as Catherine Rollins

Episode chronology
← Previous "A ʻohe ia e loaʻa aku, he ulua kapapa no ka moana"	Next → —
- Hawaii Five-0 (2010 TV series, season 10)

"Aloha" (Hawaiian for: "Goodbye") is the second part of the two-part series finale of Hawaii Five-0. It is also the twenty-second episode of the tenth season. It aired on April 3, 2020, on CBS. The story for the episode was written by Peter M. Lenkov, and the teleplay was written by David Wolkove and Matt Wheeler. The episode was directed by Duane Clark.

== Plot ==
In a flashback Wo Fat, Victor Hesse, and Daiyu Mei, Wo Fat's wife, are shown planning of the attempted extraction of Anton Hesse, Victor's brother, that led to the murder of Steve McGarrett's father, John McGarrett, and the eventual events of the pilot episode. Steve and Lincoln are discussing the cipher he offered to get solved for him and it is revealed that Lincoln also knows Catherine Rollins. The two go to meet Marshall, the guy Lincoln got to solve the cipher, Danny calls Steve and says that someone is tailing him. The two go to assist Danny hearing gunshots while en route. When Steve and Lincoln find Danny's car they find Danny has been kidnapped. Steve receives a call from Daiyu Mei who tells him that she will trade the cipher from Doris McGarrett, Steve's mother, for Danny's life. Steve meets Daiyu Mei and gives her the cipher, in exchange he gets the address of Danny's location. Danny breaks free but gets shot on his way out. Five-0 finds Danny badly wounded and rushes him to the hospital. Lincoln and Quinn go to meet Marshall but all they find are bloody drag marks. The two track Marshall's car to a car graveyard where they find Marshall's car crushed with blood. Lincoln finds out the cipher were coordinates which Steve recognizes to be the supposed grave of Doris when she faked her death. Through security footage Five-0 finds that the grave was full of cash and Daiyu Mei's associates emptied it out. Facial recognition finds identity of one of the associates and they track their location. Steve gets Daiyu Mei at gun point where she reveals her motivation to be Wo Fat's death and is taken into custody. In another flashback scene, Victor Hesse enters John's house, holds him at gunpoint, and puts Wo Fat and John into contact with each other. When Danny is released from the hospital, he and Steve have a conversation revealing that Steve is leaving the island, which reiterates the fact that he needs peace. The two share their goodbyes. As Steve says bye to his dog, Eddie, the rest of Five-0 shows up to say goodbye. Before he leaves, Steve puts Lincoln in charge of the Five-0 task force. After boarding the plane, Catherine joins Steve and reveals she is the one who solved the cipher after Lincoln contacted her.

=== Continuity ===
In the series fourth season premiere, Danny Williams' (portrayed by actor Scott Caan) car was blown up by the show's portrayal of the National Liberation Movement. The blown-up car was shown atop a stack of cars in the car graveyard. When arresting Daiyu Mei, Steve McGarrett (portrayed by actor Alex O'Loughlin) said "Book 'em Cole" contrary to the normal "Book 'em Danno" stated when McGarrett ordering that someone be booked into jail by his partner Danny Williams.

== Production ==
=== Development ===
On February 28, 2020, it was announced that Hawaii Five-0 would conclude after the tenth season with a two-part series finale. The episode's title was revealed to be "Aloha" in an instagram post by developer, showrunner, and executive producer Peter M. Lenkov on March 3, 2020, when he also announced that it would be the final day of filming. Five for Fighting recorded an acoustic version of All for One, a song by the same band made for the one-hundredth episode, and entitled it All for One Ohana. A cut version of the song was used in the episode's trailer, with the song originally set to release on streaming on platforms on March 20. The release date, however, was pushed back and the song was instead released on April 3.

=== Casting ===
Despite being credited in the opening title sequence Taylor Wily and Dennis Chun did not appear in the episode with Lenkov revealing the reason for their absence being time constraints. On February 14, 2020 it was announced that Lance Gross would appear as Lincoln Cole. On February 28, 2020 it was announced that James Marsters, William Sadler, and Mark Dacascos would return as Victor Hesse, John McGarrett, and Wo Fat, respectively. Will Yun Lee, who recurred in the series as Sang Min, revealed that due to his tight schedule he was not able to appear in the finale despite the heavy attempt. When asked about bringing back former main cast members Daniel Dae Kim and Grace Park Lenkov stated that "If I would have brought those characters back, I feel like they needed more time on-screen. I couldn't just put them in for a moment at the end. They deserved more." Former main cast member Michelle Borth returned in the episodes final moments as Catherine Rollins; however, her appearance was not mentioned in any press releases put out prior to the episodes airing.

=== Filming ===
In an interview with Entertainment Tonight Canada, Lenkov revealed that the scene where most of the characters said goodbye to Steve was mostly ad-libbed. He also said that the scene was shot two hours after he told the cast and crew that the series was going to end.

=== Post-production ===
In an interview with TVLine after the episode aired Lenkov revealed that twelve minutes of the episode had been cut in post-production due to time constraints.

=== Release ===
The episode was originally set to be part of a two-hour series finale, however due to the cancellation of the 2020 NCAA Division I men's basketball tournament, the first part was moved up a week, and this episode aired an hour earlier on April 3, 2020, keeping its regular timeslot.

== Reception ==
=== Viewing figures ===
In the United States, the episode was watched live by 9.59 million viewers, making it the most watched episode since season eight. Within seven days, the episode was watched by 12.14 million viewers.

=== Critical response ===
Dale McGarrigle with TV Fanatic, said "Despite the lateness of the cancellation, the finale still felt organic, not hastily rearranged to fit the new finality. Would a longer episode, so that Jerry, Kamekona, and Duke could have made finale appearances, been worthwhile? Probably not. This finale did what needed to be done inside a tight 43 minutes, no easy feat. Most importantly, it brought McGarrett full circle, from Wo Fat's scheme bringing him back to Hawaii to Wo Fat's widow being the last perp he takes down before leaving the islands, after solving the mystery of Doris." He also gave the episode a perfect 5 out of 5 stars.

== Part 1 ==
The first part of the two-part finale, titled "A ʻohe ia e loaʻa aku, he ulua kapapa no ka moana", aired on March 27, 2020.

== Future ==
Following the episode, multiple Hawaii Five-0 characters continued to make appearances on Magnum P.I, as they have done throughout Magnum P.I.'s run, and it is confirmed that characters from Hawaii Five-0 will appear in the third season of Magnum P.I. Jorge Garcia, who left Hawaii Five-0 in the tenth season premiere, "Ua ʻeha ka ʻili i ka maka o ka ihe", reprised his role as Jerry Ortega in a fifth season episode of MacGyver.

== See also ==
- List of Hawaii Five-0 (2010 TV series) episodes
- Hawaii Five-0 (2010 TV series) season 10
