= Hawaii Five-0 and Magnum P.I. crossover =

Fictional crossover

- Lenkov-verse crossover event
- Original air date: January 3, 2020

Part 1: Hawaii Five-0
- Episode title: "Ihea 'oe i ka wa a ka ua e loku ana?"
- Episode no.: Season 10; Episode 12
- Directed by: Katie Boyum
- Story by: Peter M. Lenkov
- Teleplay by: David Wolkove
- Production code: 1013

Episode chronology
← Previous "Ka i ka 'ino, no ka 'ino"	Next → "Loa'a pono ka 'iole i ka punana"
- Hawaii Five-0 (2010 TV series) season 10

Part 2: Magnum P.I.
- Episode title: "Desperate Measures"
- Episode no.: Season 2 Episode 12
- Directed by: Maja Vrvillo
- Written by: Peter M. Lenkov & Eric Guggenheim
- Production code: MPI212

Episode chronology
← Previous "Day I Met the Devil"	Next → "Mondays Are for Murder"
- Magnum P.I. (2018 TV series) season 2

The Hawaii Five-0 and Magnum P.I. crossover is a two-part crossover event between Hawaii Five-0 and Magnum P.I. that aired on CBS. The event aired on January 3, 2020, with the Hawaii Five-0 episode "Ihea 'oe i ka wa a ka ua e loku ana?" which is Hawaiian for "Where were you when the rain was pouring?", followed by the Magnum P.I. episode "Desperate Measures". Jay Hernandez, Perdita Weeks, Zachary Knighton, Stephen Hill, Meaghan Rath, Katrina Law, and Beulah Koale appeared in both parts of the event as Thomas Magnum, Juliet Higgins, Orville "Rick" Wright, Theodore "TC" Calvin, Tani Rey, Quinn Liu, and Junior Reigns, respectively (Melissa Tang also guest starred in both parts as Erin Hong).

== Cast and characters ==
=== Main ===
The following contains a list of actors receiving main billing in the crossover event:

Actor	Character	Episode	
Actor	Character	Hawaii Five-0	Magnum P.I.
Alex O'Loughlin	Steve McGarrett	Main	
Scott Caan	Danny "Danno" Williams	Main (Note: Credited but did not appear in the episode)	
Ian Anthony Dale	Adam Noshimuri	Main	
Meaghan Rath	Tani Rey	Main	Guest
Beulah Koale	Junior Reigns	Main	Guest
Katrina Law	Quinn Liu	Main	Guest
Taylor Wily	Kamekona	Main	Guest
Dennis Chun	Sgt. Duke Lukela	Main	
Kimee Balmilero	Dr. Noelani Cunha	Main	
Chi McBride	Captain Lou Grover	Main	
Jay Hernandez	Thomas Magnum	Guest	Main
Perdita Weeks	Juliet Higgins	Guest	Main
Zachary Knighton	Orville "Rick" Wright	Guest	Main
Stephen Hill	Theodore "TC" Calvin	Guest	Main
Amy Hill	Kumu		Main
Tim Kang	Det. Gordon Katsumoto		Main

=== Guests ===
The following contains a list of notable guests appearing in the crossover event:

Actor	Character	Episode	
Actor	Character	Hawaii Five-0	Magnum P.I.
Melissa Tang	Erin Hong	Guest	Guest
Jo Sung	Charlie Fong	Guest	
Jason Lee Hoy	Baldy	Guest	
Chad X Lerma	Officer Hollis	Guest	
Ken Kirby	Eli Sung		Guest
Amy Tsang	Loi Chau		Guest
Terrence Arashi Elliott	CIA Agent		Guest
Lloyd Barachina	Thug #1		Guest

== Plot ==
=== Part 1: "Ihea 'oe i ka wa a ka ua e loku ana?" ===
McGarrett and the task force track down a suspect who might be connected to the stolen list of undercover CIA agents. When the suspect gets away, the task force run into Thomas Magnum and his partner, Higgins and discover that they are looking for the same suspect for a client they are looking after. McGarrett reluctantly begins working with Magnum and his team to try to find the stolen list. Meanwhile, Tani reaches out to Adam concerning about his wellbeing only for Adam to flee Hawaii. Also, after getting advice from Higgins, Tani asks Junior out on a date only to get kidnapped by thugs.

=== Part 2: "Desperate Measures" ===
When Hong, a man that Magnum and Higgins are monitoring for a client, gets shot and killed and his killer escapes, the team from Hawaii Five-0 gets involved. Magnum, Higgins, TC and Rick assist as the group recovers a secret list of CIA double-agents. Soon after, Junior Reigns is kidnapped as leverage for the criminals to get the list back, leading to Magnum's team helping Tani Rey and Quinn Liu in a search-and-rescue mission.

== Production ==
Before the crossover, Hawaii Five-0 characters had crossed over to Magnum P.I., such as Kamekona (Taylor Wily), Duke (Dennis Chun), Noelani (Kimee Balmilero), Flippa (Shawn Mokuahi Garnett) and P.I. Harry Brown (William Forsythe). The showrunner for both shows, Peter M. Lenkov, had wanted to include MacGyver (also showrunned by Lenkov) in the crossover, but eventually it was decided to just do a Hawaii Five-0 and Magnum P.I. crossover.

== Reception ==
=== Critical response ===
Dale McGarrigle with TV Fanatic said "Finally, a crossover that felt genuinely organic." and gave the episode an editorial rating of 4.5 out of 5 stars.

=== Viewing figures ===
==== United States ====
In the United States the first part of the crossover was watched live by 8.06 million viewers. Within seven days, the episode was watched by a total of 10.56 million viewers. The second part was watched live by 7.83 million viewers. Within seven days, the episode was watched by a total of 10.38 million viewers.
