= Nalowale i ke 'ehu o he kai =

- Hawaii Five-0 episode
- Rick Wright (Zachary Knighton) in a crossover appearance as his Magnum P.I. character.
- Episode no.: Season 10; Episode 18
- Directed by: Tate Donovan
- Story by: Zoe Robyn
- Teleplay by: Talia Gonzalez & Bisanne Masoud
- Production code: 1018
- Original air date: February 28, 2020

Guest appearances
- Zachary Knighton as Rick Wright; Fernando Chien as Kenji; Jean Ota as Iolana Cunha; Roy M. Balmilero as Joseph Cunha; Max Phyo as Councilman Mikala; Enson Inoue as Etsuji; Stephen Lau as Hideo; Victor Naval as Akumu; Ian Verdun as Chief Mate Lawson; Peter James Smith as Dr. Hidoko; Gregory Cruz as Eke Mohoe; Rodney Rowland as Oz; Denny McAuliffe as Lewis; Grant Udagawa as Ishi; Joseph E. Agudo as CSU Tech; Donavon Frankenreiter as himself

Episode chronology
← Previous "He kohu puahiohio i ka ho'olele i ka lepo i luna"	Next → "E ho'i na keiki oki uaua o na pali"
- Hawaii Five-0 (2010 TV series, season 10)

"Nalowale i ke 'ehu o he kai" (Hawaiian for: "Lost in the sea sprays") is the eighteenth episode of the tenth and final season of Hawaii Five-0. It aired on February 28, 2020 on CBS. The story for the episode was written by Zoe Robyn, and the teleplay was written by Talia Gonzalez and Bisanne Masoud. Tate Donovan directed the episode. The episode included a crossover appearance from Zachary Knighton as Rick Wright, his character from Magnum P.I.

== Plot ==
Five-0 investigates a murder on a coast guard ship and suspect that pirates are impersonating as Coast Guard officers to board ships. With some help from Rick Wright, they are able to solve the case. Meanwhile, Adam holds the key evidence to take down Hawaii’s Yakuza once and for all. Also, Noelani enlists the help from Quinn when she suspects that her uncle did not die of a heart attack and thinks it was a murder cover up. Lastly, everyone celebrates at La Mariana, Rick's bar.

== Production ==
Hawaii Five-0 and Magnum P.I. had previously crossed over in a two-part crossover event earlier in the season, and Hawaii Five-0 characters have also appeared in numerous episodes of Magnum P.I.

=== Casting ===
The episode featured a crossover appearance from Magnum P.I, Zachary Knighton as Rick Wright. Roy M. Balmilero, the father of series regular, Kimee Balmilero, appeared as the father of his daughter's character, Noelani. Also, musician Donavon Frankenreiter appeared as himself. Despite being credited in the opening title sequence Taylor Wily and Dennis Chun did not appear in the episode.

== Reception ==
=== Viewing figures ===
In the United States the episode was watched live by 6.81 million viewers. Within seven days, the episode was watched by a total of 9.55 million viewers.

=== Critical response ===
Dale McGarrigle with TV Fanatic said "importantly, the Adam storyline finally, finally got tied up. ... In, what, like 10 minutes? 'Enough already. No one is liking this concept.'" He also gave the episode an editorial rating of 4.3 out of 5 stars.

== See also ==
- List of Hawaii Five-0 (2010 TV series) episodes
- Hawaii Five-0 (2010 TV series, season 10)
