= A ʻohe ia e loaʻa aku, he ulua kapapa no ka moana =

- Hawaii Five-0 episode
- Episode no.: Season 10; Episode 21
- Directed by: Roderick Davis
- Written by: Peter M. Lenkov & David Wolkove
- Production code: 1021
- Original air date: March 27, 2020

Guest appearances
- Lance Gross as Lincoln Cole; Chuck Norris as Lee Phillips; John Douglas as Marc Acosta; Lobo Sebastian as Hector

Episode chronology
← Previous "He puhe‘e miki"	Next → "Aloha"
- Hawaii Five-0 (2010 TV series, season 10)

"A ʻohe ia e loaʻa aku, he ulua kapapa no ka moana" (Hawaiian for: "He cannot be caught for he is an ulua fish of the deep ocean") is the first part of the two-part series finale of Hawaii Five-0. It is also the twenty-first and penultimate episode of the tenth and final season. It aired on March 27, 2020, on CBS. The episode was written by Peter M. Lenkov and David Wolkove, and directed by Roderick Davis.

== Plot ==
Steve McGarrett receives a visit from a person Doris, Steve's mother, hired to hand-deliver a letter after her death. Meanwhile, two bank robbers are escorting two hostages, Sylvia and her child back from a local diner to her home. A busboy from the diner returns a toy the child left behind, notices the two men, and engages them, defusing the situation by killing one of the men and chasing away the other. Before Sylvia can dial 911 the busboy disappears. Danny finds Steve at John's, Steve's fathers, grave. Steve reveals to Danny that the letter Doris left is only a cipher, confiding in Danny how much things have changed in the ten-years since his father died, that he doesn't plan on solving the cipher because he doesn't need another mystery in his life.

Five-0 begins looking for the two men along with the mysterious busboy who is found to be living under an assumed identity of a person who's been dead for three years. Adam searches the busboy's hotel room and finds DNA which matches to Lincoln Cole, a former marine who went AWOL. McGarrett and Junior go to see Lee Phillips, a former commanding officer of Cole's. They find Cole and take him into custody. The brother of the man Cole killed takes Sylvia and her child hostage again and orders Five-0 to give Cole up or he will kill Sylvia and her child. Military Police arrive to take Cole into their custody for going AWOL, with no other options McGarrett releases Cole into their custody. While in transport, Cole manages to break free. Cole exchanges himself for Sylvia and her child, the man's brother is about to shoot Cole but Five-0, who suspected Cole's next move, engages him and his men in a gun battle, saving everyone.

McGarrett arranges for Cole's charges to be dropped. In McGarrett's office Cole notices the cipher and offers to reach out to his contacts to have it solved and McGarrett takes him up on the offer. Danny, concerned about McGarrett's mental health reaches out to him; McGarrett talks about needing a break in the near future. In McGarrett's house Danny finds a burglar going through McGarrett's stuff. Danny manages to fight off the burglar, McGarrett reveals that the burglar took the envelope that Doris's cipher was in but that he never put the cipher back in the envelope.

== Production ==
The episode was the first part of the show's series finale.

=== Casting ===
Despite being credited in the opening title sequence Taylor Wily and Dennis Chun did not appear in the episode. On February 14, 2020 it was announced that Lance Gross would appear as Lincoln Cole. On March 5, 2020 it was announced that Chuck Norris would appear as Lee Phillips (This would be Norris’ final television role before his death in March 2026.)

=== Release ===
The episode was originally set to air on April 3, as part of a two-hour series finale, however due to the cancellation of the 2020 NCAA Division I men's basketball tournament, the episode was moved up a week to March 27, 2020.

== Reception ==
=== Viewing figures ===
In the United States the episode was watched live by 8.44 million viewers.

=== Critical response ===
Dale McGarrigle with TV Fanatic said "well, that was a peek at what will never be," and "as far as Chuck Norris's appearance, I call criminal misuse. You don't have Walker, Texas Ranger on the show and have him do nothing more threatening than holding an ax. Seriously underutilized." He also gave the episode an editorial rating of 4.5 out of 5 stars.

== Part 2 ==
The second part of the two-part finale, titled "Aloha", aired on April 3, 2020.

== See also ==
- List of Hawaii Five-0 (2010 TV series) episodes
- Hawaii Five-0 (2010 TV series) season 10
