= Ua ʻeha ka ʻili i ka maka o ka ihe =

- Hawaii Five-0 episode
- Episode no.: Season 10; Episode 1
- Directed by: Duane Clark
- Story by: Peter M. Lenkov
- Teleplay by: David Wolkove; Matt Wheeler
- Production code: 1002
- Original air date: September 27, 2019

Guest appearances
- Katie Wee as Brooke; Paul S.W. Lee as Dr. Paulson; Eddie Anderson as SWAT Commander; Rob Morrow as Cullen; Roland Nip as Zhang; Wes Zane as Yakuza Leader; Hank Holliday as Mayor; Grace Lee as TV Anchor; Dennis Takeshita as Yakuza Leader #2; Lehua Kalima as Singer #1; Ryan Souza as Singer #2

Episode chronology
← Previous "Hana Mao 'ole ka ua o Waianae"	Next → "Kuipeia e ka makani apaa"
- Hawaii Five-0 (2010 TV series, season 10)

"Ua 'eha ka 'ili i ka maka o ka ihe" (Hawaiian for: "The skin has been hurt by the point of the spear") is the first episode of the tenth season of Hawaii Five-0. It aired on September 27, 2019 on CBS. The story for the episode was written by Peter M. Lenkov and the teleplay was written by David Wolkove and Matt Wheeler. The episode was directed by Duane Clark.

== Plot ==
In the Five-0 offices Lou shoots and kills Azra, Omar Hassan's wife. Meanwhile, Jerry was shot by Azra and Steve begins tending to his wounds. Two weeks later Jerry is recovering in the hospital and begins thinking about moving on to other things. While Junior and Tani are at an opera show they witness a murder-for-hire hit on a Chinese triad leader. Steve and Danny engage in a firefight with the hitman but he escapes. Adam finds out that a woman at a bar asked as if anyone had seen the suspect and leaves a phone number. They track the phone number and find Quinn Liu, a staff sergeant with Army CID who had been recently demoted to Military Police for insubordination, who informs them that two military veterans had recently gone missing. At a local hospital the stolen car was found along with a trail of blood leading to a doctor's parking spot who didn't show up for work. The doctor's car is tracked to a warehouse where Five-0 along with the Honolulu Police Department (HPD) plan to raid but the hitman commits suicide before they can arrest him. Upon searching his phone they find out he had an accomplice who plans on carrying out more hits. Adam gets a meeting with Yakuza leaders in an attempt to find out who could possibly be behind the hits. The hitman's accomplice attempts to carry out the hit on Masuda, one of the leaders. When HPD backup arrives the partner escapes without performing the hit. Quinn later shoots and kills him when he attempts to perform a final hit. At Kamekona's shrimp truck Steve informs Quinn that the District Attorney decided not to pursue charges due to lack of evidence and Steve asks her if she would be interested in pursuing the case further with him which she accepts. Also, Jerry informs the team that he decided to move on from Five-0 to write a book that he didn't want to put off until it's too late. At Steve's house an unknown figure is seen putting a small explosive in Steve's "Champ" tool box that had belonged to his father John.

== Production ==
The episode was the second filmed episode of the season, after "Ka 'i'o".

=== Casting ===
The episode marked the final appearance for series regular Jorge Garcia, who played Jerry Ortega, in the series. Garcia, who had played Ortega since the fourth season and became a series regular in the fifth season, remained for the episode allowing for his story line to be wrapped up. The door was left open for Garcia to return as a guest character later in the series. The episode also marks the first appearance for Katrina Law who joined as a series regular to replace Garcia. Law was cast as Quinn Liu, a former Army CID Staff Sergeant demoted for insubordination. Despite being credited in the opening title sequence Kimee Balmilero did not appear in the episode.

== Reception ==
=== Viewing figures ===
In the United States the episode was watched live by 7.03 million viewers. Within seven days, the episode was watched by a total of 9.72 million viewers.

=== Critical response ===
Dale McGarrigle with TV Fanatic said, "after one episode, I'm not at all sold that [Quinn replacing Jerry] is an improvement," but he did go on to say that "Jerry's departure did feel organic, which was important." He also gave the episode an editorial rating of 4.3 out of 5 stars.

== See also ==
- List of Hawaii Five-0 (2010 TV series) episodes
- Hawaii Five-0 (2010 TV series) season 10
