= Danny "Danno" Williams =

Danny "Danno" Williams is a fictional character from CBS' Hawaii Five-O, and is the partner of Five-0 leader, Steve McGarrett. Williams was portrayed by James MacArthur in the original show from 1968 to 1979, and later by Scott Caan in the series' remake from 2010 to 2020

== Hawaii Five-O (1968–1980) ==
Danny Williams
- Hawaii Five-O character
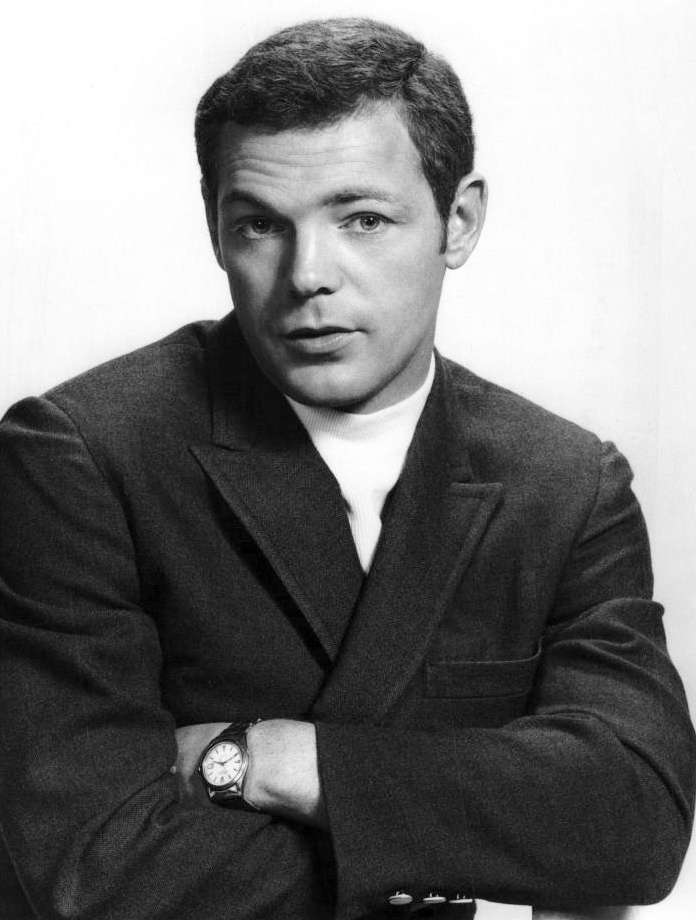
- James MacArthur portrayed Danny Williams in the original show
- First appearance: "Cocoon" (episode 1.01), (portrayed by Tim O'Kelly) "Full Fathom Five" (episode 1.02), (portrayed by James MacArthur)
- Last appearance: "The Year of the Horse" (episode 11.21)
- Portrayed by: Tim O'Kelly ("Cocoon"); James MacArthur

In-universe information
- Full name: Daniel Williams
- Nickname: Danno
- Title(s): Detective Sergeant; Lieutenant
- Occupation: Member of the Five-0 Task Force
- Relatives: Clara (aunt)

In the original show, Danny Williams was portrayed by James MacArthur from 1968 to 1979. In the series premiere, "Cocoon", Danny was played by Tim O'Kelly. MacArthur played the role for the rest of the first eleven seasons, appearing in 268 episodes. The only episode of the first eleven seasons, other than "Cocoon", that MacArthur did not appear in, was "Once Upon a Time: Part 2". In season twelve, the character was replaced by a new character, James Carew, who was portrayed by William Smith. MacArthur returned to reprise the role of Danny, who had become Hawaii's governor in the plot, in the 1997 unaired pilot of Hawaii Five-O.

In "Retire in Sunny Hawaii...Forever", it is revealed that Danny has an aunt named Clara (portrayed by MacArthur's mother, Helen Hayes). In "The Clock Struck Twelve", it is revealed that Danny is skilled at defusing bombs.

MacArthur had agreed to guest-star in an episode of the first season of the reboot, but he died on October 28, 2010, before filming his appearance.

== Hawaii Five-0 (2010–2020) ==
Danny Williams GC
- Hawaii Five-0 character
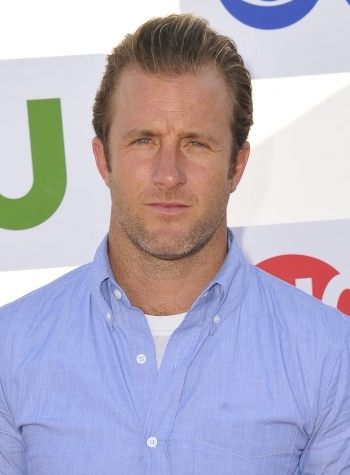
- Scott Caan portrayed Danny Williams in the reboot
- First appearance: Pilot (episode 1.01)
- Last appearance: "Aloha" / "Goodbye" (episode 10.22)
- Portrayed by: Scott Caan
- Other appearances: NCIS: Los Angeles ("Touch of Death")

In-universe information
- Nicknames: Danno (by Grace, Charlie, and Steve); Jersey (by Kamekona and Melissa); Haole (by Kamekona)
- Title: Detective Sergeant
- Occupation: Member of the Five-0 Task Force; Detective, Honolulu PD (formerly); Police officer/detective, Newark PD (formerly)
- Family: Eddie Williams (father); Clara Williams (mother); Matthew Williams (brother; deceased); Stella Williams Russo (sister); Bridgett Williams (sister)
- Spouse: Rachel Hollander (ex-wife)
- Significant others: Melissa Armstrong (ex-girlfriend); Gabrielle “Gabby” Asano (ex-girlfriend)
- Children: Grace Williams (daughter); Charlie Williams (son)
- Relatives: Eric Russo (nephew) unnamed niece unnamed nephew

In the reboot, Danny Williams is portrayed by Scott Caan from 2010 to 2020. Caan portrayed Danny in all ten seasons, appearing in 208 episodes. Caan also portrayed Danny in a crossover episode with NCIS: Los Angeles. Scott Caan was nominated for the Golden Globe Award for Best Supporting Actor – Series, Miniseries or Television Film, in 2011, and for the Teen Choice Award for Choice Action TV Actor, in 2013, for his portrayal of Danny. Caan, along with Alex O'Loughlin, won the TV Guide Award for Favorite Bromance, in 2013, for their portrayal's of Danny and Steve McGarrett, respectively.

Detective Sergeant Daniel "Danny" "Danno" James Williams is a member of the Five-0 Task Force and the de facto second in command. He is an experienced detective whose police background and tendency to go "by the book" clashes with McGarrett's "shoot now, talk later" style.

It is established in Season 1 that Danny was from New Jersey, presumably around the New York metropolitan area, and was only living in Hawaii because his ex-wife Rachel had remarried and moved there with their daughter Grace to join her new husband Stan Edwards. He transferred from Newark PD to the Honolulu PD to be closer to Grace. In the Pilot, Danny had moved to Hawaii six months ago and was a "greener than grass" homicide detective with the HPD when he was assigned the murder investigation of John McGarrett. He comes into contact with John's son Lieutenant Commander Steve McGarrett, then still on active duty, who returns home to Hawaii seeking revenge and intending to take over the investigation into the murder of his father. The Governor had requested the younger McGarrett to set up a task force and Danny was his first recruit. They then recruit Chin Ho Kelly and Kono Kalakaua to form the Five-0 Task Force.

Danny often rants to McGarrett about his dislike for everything Hawaiian, from pineapples on pizza to surfing etiquette, while McGarrett would mock his affinity for wearing ties and loafers at work, a practice not common in Hawaii. Regarded as a haole for being a non-Hawaiian and not following island customs during the first season, Danny is often viewed as a curiosity or with disdain by the locals and other HPD cops and the first season sees the rest of the team often having to explain to him the idiosyncrasies of life in Hawaii. For example, his insistence on wearing what he deemed to be "professional attire" (tie and loafers) and disregard for surf etiquette or Native Hawaiian culture is met with ridicule and light-hearted derision from his co-workers. He eventually stops wearing ties and, in the season 5 premiere, admits that he feels at home in Hawaii and views his Five-0 co-workers as his extended family.

The son of Eddie and Clara Williams, he comes from a large working-class family and is the second oldest of four children. He has a younger brother Matt and two sisters (one of whom is older sister named Stella), both of whom are married. It is implied through his conversations with McGarrett that Danny is close to his family, although the rift between him and Matt never closed due to Matt drifting towards the criminal side of the business world. In season 3 Stella sends her son Eric Russo, who had dropped out of college, to Danny in a desperate attempt to set him straight. Eric, who calls Danny "Uncle D", spends the day tailing the Five-0 team on a case involving college professor and his students and finds his calling in forensics after providing some valuable insights which led to the arrest of the perpetrator. He moves to Hawaii and begins working in the forensics lab from season 5 onwards.

Danny began his career as a police officer with the Newark PD. When he was a patrol officer, he testified against his training officer, Rick Peterson (Peter Greene), under a subpoena during Peterson's trial for corruption. He worked his way up to become a respected homicide detective with 87 convictions before transferring to the Honolulu Police Department. In 2001, he witnessed the murder of his partner Grace Tilwell by a pair of gangsters they had been sent to apprehend. After barely making it out alive, he notices smoke billowing from the World Trade Center and was later ordered to New York City to assist the NYPD. That day still haunts Danny and his daughter Grace was named after Tilwell. He often describes his time with the Newark PD as a "happy time" of his life as he was still happily married to Rachel and Grace was born. Danny is portrayed as a loyal cop who is married to his job first and life second. As a consequence, he is often at odds with his ex-wife Rachel for sometimes not being on time to pick up Grace. He is very loyal to his friends and colleagues, once refusing to believe that his former HPD partner Meka was corrupt even when pitted against overwhelming evidence after the partner was found dead under suspicious circumstances. Likewise, he often gives Steve the benefit of the doubt even when the latter resorts to more "unorthodox" methods in an investigation as he trusts Steve's judgment.

A running gag in the show is the regular "carguments" between Danny and McGarrett. Much of Danny's interaction with McGarrett outside work usually involves an argument on the way to and from a crime scene or when interviewing suspects, resulting in characters commenting about the duo being like an "old married couple". Their partnership even being referred to as a marriage by Danny (and several other characters), and him even calling McGarrett "babe" on several occasions. Their polar opposite personalities and work styles are often a source of both friction and banter. For example, McGarrett is extremely neat and organized, likely a result of his military days, whereas Danny tends to be a slob, as evidenced by the appearance of their offices and homes. Danny's "by-the-book" style contrasts with McGarrett's "the ends justify the means" approach (which Danny calls "shoot now, ask questions later"). Lou Grover once described Danny as "the brains" to McGarrett's "brawn". Indeed, by season 2, he adopts some of McGarrett's crude and unorthodox interrogation techniques, prompting Chin to comment that he has been "hanging out with McGarrett too long".

In "Hana Keaka", it is mentioned that Danny attended Seton Hall University where he minored in business, which made him the ideal candidate to go undercover at Oahu State University as an economics professor.

In "No Ke Ali'i' Wahine A Me Ka Aina", Danny and Steve, along with an MI-6 officer (Chris Vance) are awarded the George Cross by Queen Elizabeth II for stopping a terrorist attack against Europe.

Danny's pistol is an H&K P30 although he carried a SIG Sauer SP2009 in the pilot.

Later, in seasons 8 and 9, Danny and Rachel reconcile. He is a passionate football fan and has mentioned that he is a fan of the New York Jets and Super Bowl–winning quarterback Peyton Manning.

== See also ==
- List of Hawaii Five-0 (2010 TV series) characters
