= Steve McGarrett =

Fictional character from Hawaii Five-O

Steven Jack McGarrett is a fictional character who is the protagonist of CBS' Hawaii Five-O created by Leonard Freeman. McGarrett is a former United States Navy officer and the leader of a special state police task force, which is called Five-O. McGarrett was portrayed by actor Jack Lord in the original show from 1968 to 1980, and later by Alex O'Loughlin in the series' remake from 2010 to 2020. Throughout the show, McGarrett is partner to Detective Danny "Danno" Williams.

== Hawaii Five-0 (1968–1980) ==
Steve McGarrett
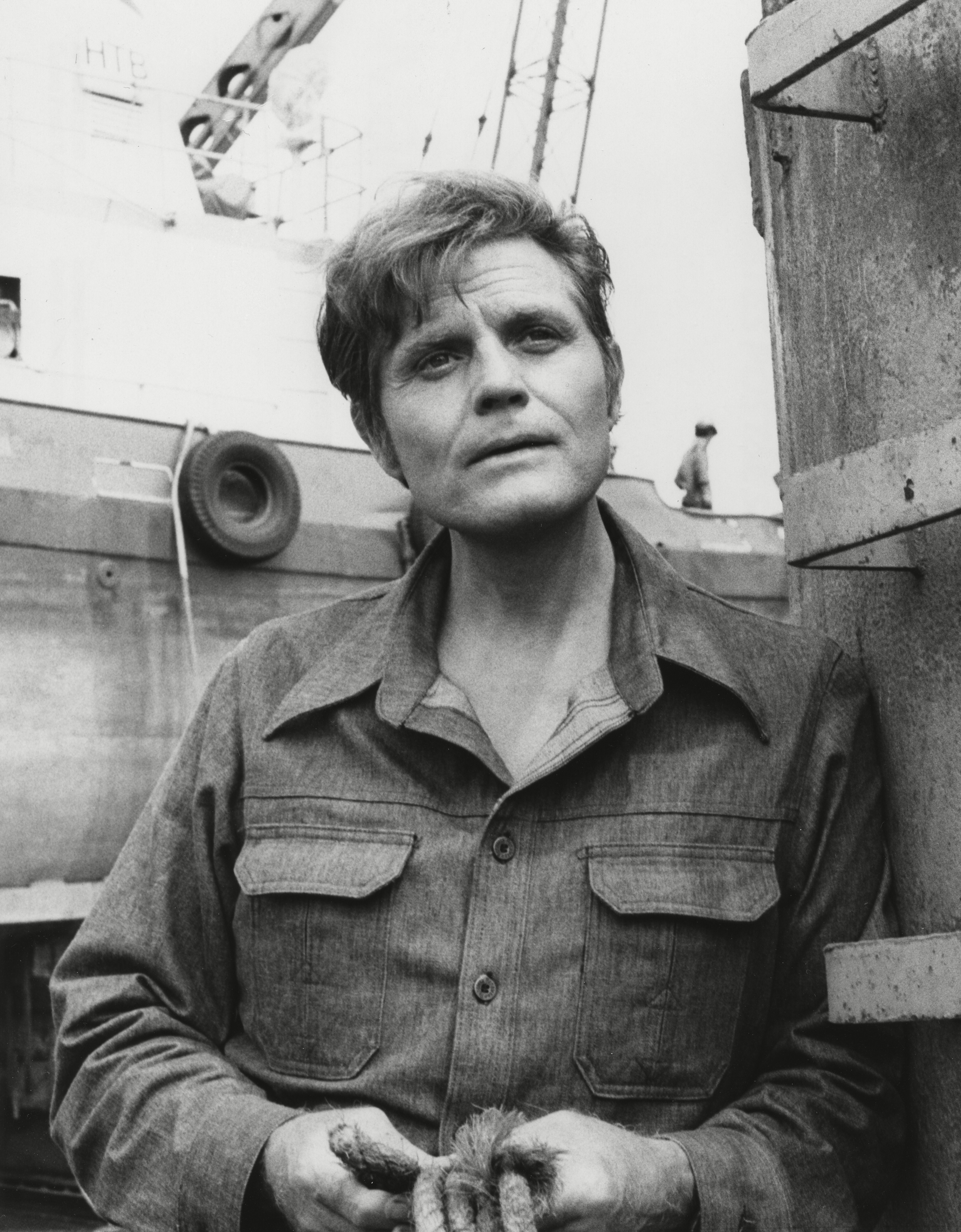
- First appearance: "Cocoon" (episode 1.01)
- Last appearance: “Woe to Wo Fat” (episode 12.19)
- Created by: Leonard Freeman
- Portrayed by: Jack Lord

In-universe information
- Title: Detective Captain
- Occupation: Head of Five-0 Task Force; Former United States Navy Lieutenant; rose to Commander USNR
- Family: Mary Ann Whalen (sister)
- Relatives: Tom Whalen (brother-in-law)

In the original show, Steve McGarrett was portrayed by Jack Lord from 1968 to 1980. McGarrett was a former United States Navy Lieutenant with the Judge Advocate General's office who, during the Korean War in 1953, sent a murderous US Navy CPO to prison; 15 years later the ex-convict shot and almost killed McGarrett (1.7 "Yesterday Died and Tomorrow Won’t be Born"). McGarrett had a sister Mary Ann (Nancy Malone). In the episode "Number One with a Bullet, Part 2", McGarrett tells a criminal, "It was a bastard like you who killed my father." His 42-year-old father had been run down and killed by someone who had just held up a supermarket. It was revealed that this personal tragedy was what motivated McGarrett to become a police officer. In one episode when two mob bosses think they have outsmarted him; McGarrett ironically refers to himself as "dumb Irish cop". McGarrett joined the Honolulu Police Department and rose to Detective Captain; at the recommendation of the ex-US Navy Prosecutor (now Attorney General of Hawaii), McGarrett was requested by Governor Paul Jameson to head the Five-O Task Force, a fictional equivalent of a state police investigative unit with broad powers of authority. He was portrayed as a highly driven cop and workaholic, often staying at his office until midnight. It was said that he "only takes orders from the Governor and God – and occasionally even they have trouble".

Little of his personal life is revealed: in the pilot episode "Cocoon", McGarrett is shown dating; in "Man in a Steel Frame" (season 9, episode 14) McGarrett's current girlfriend has been murdered and McGarrett is nearly framed for the murder.

Throughout the series he drives a black Mercury; a 1967 2-door Mercury Marquis hardtop with a red interior in the pilot episode, followed by a 1968 4-door Mercury Park Lane Brougham hardtop, then ultimately a 1974 4-door Mercury Marquis Brougham hardtop in subsequent episodes. He has only three predictable routines: a morning jog on a Hawaii beach (1.7 "Yesterday Died and Tomorrow Won't Be Reborn"), an afternoon jog in a Hawaii park Monday and Friday (but not on Wednesday) and a Tuesday haircut.

== Hawaii Five-0 (2010–2020) ==
Steve McGarrett GC
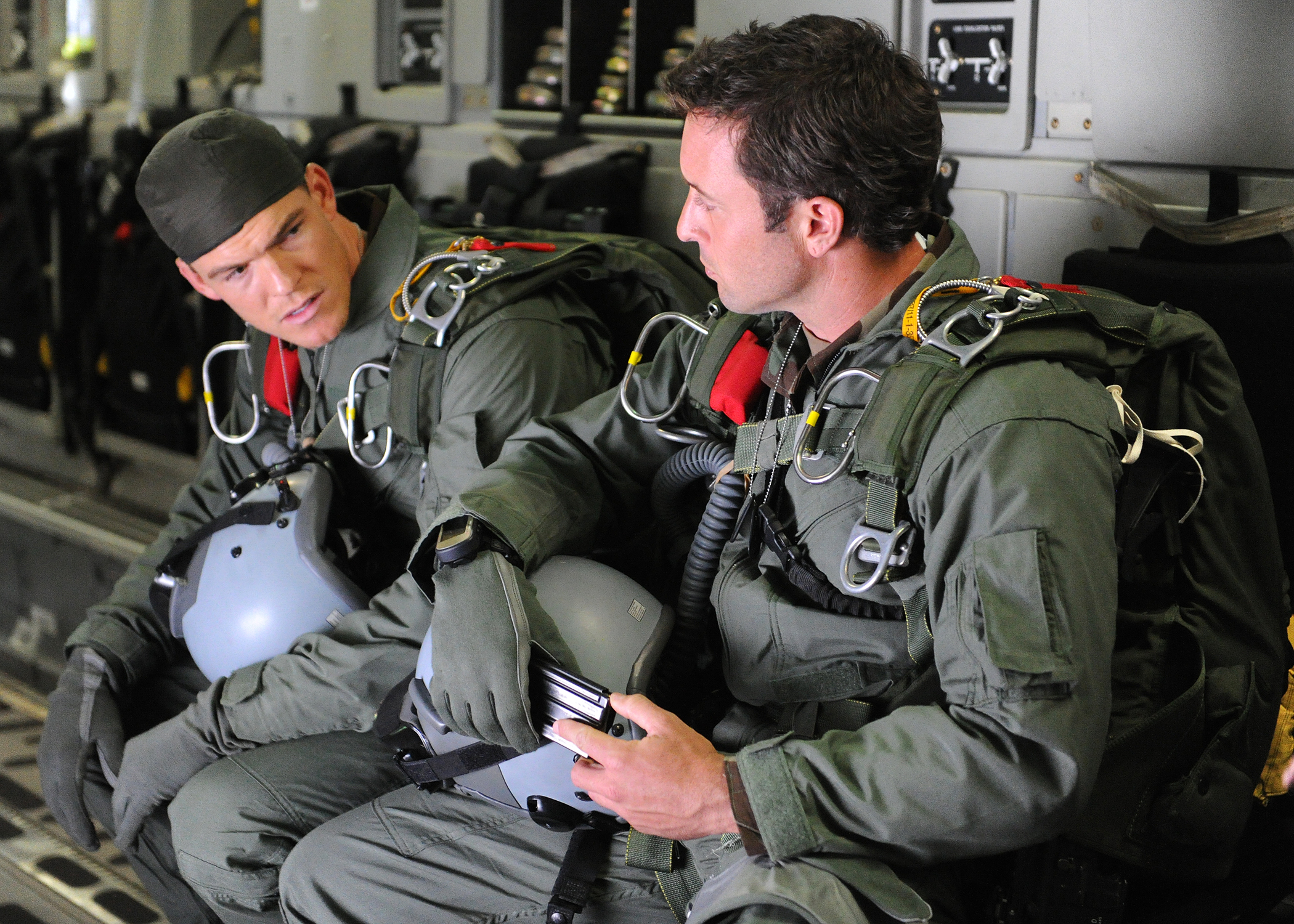
- First appearance: "Pilot" (episode 1.01)
- Last appearance: "Aloha" (episode 10.22)
- Created by: Leonard Freeman; Peter M. Lenkov
- Portrayed by: Alex O'Loughlin

In-universe information
- Full name: Steven J McGarrett
- Nicknames: Stevie (by Aunt Deb); Smooth Dog; McGruff; Sailor (by Catherine)
- Title: Lieutenant commander
- Occupation: Head of Five-0 Task Force; USNR; United States Navy (former)
- Family: John McGarrett (father; deceased); Doris McGarrett (mother, deceased); Mary Ann McGarrett (sister); Steven McGarrett (grandfather; deceased); Joan McGarrett (niece)
- Significant others: Catherine Rollins (girlfriend); Lynn Downey (ex-girlfriend); Greer (ex- girlfriend); Brooke (ex-girlfriend); Dr Okino (ex-girlfriend)
- Relatives: Deborah "Deb" McGarrett (aunt) (deceased)

Australian actor Alex O'Loughlin portrays McGarrett in the reboot of the series from 2010 to 2020. This incarnation bears some similarities to Lord's character from the original, such as their Navy Intelligence background and a long-standing nemesis in Wo Fat.

In the pilot episode, Lieutenant Commander Steven J. "Steve" McGarrett was in South Korea on a classified mission escorting wanted arms dealer Anton Hesse when he received a call via satellite phone from his father John and finds out that Anton's brother Victor was coincidentally holding John hostage on an unrelated matter. McGarrett's convoy was attacked by a helicopter of armed men trying to rescue Anton, resulting in Anton being killed. When Victor finds out, he shoots John point blank with the younger McGarrett still on the line. McGarrett returns to Hawaii to bury his father and is asked by Governor Jameson to set up a task force with "full immunity and means" to investigate and capture criminals such as the Hesse brothers. Despite his initial hesitation, he eventually agrees and transfers to the United States Navy Reserve. He then recruits Newark PD transfer, Detective Sergeant Danny "Danno" Williams, his father's former trainee Lieutenant Chin Ho Kelly and recent HPD Academy graduate Officer Kono Kalakaua. These four make up the original members of the "Governor's Task Force", later renamed "Five-0". When McGarrett assembles his task force, he partners with Williams.

=== Background ===
Steven Jack McGarrett was born in Hawaii on March 10, 1977 to John and Doris McGarrett. Since returning to Hawaii, McGarrett has lived in his childhood home along the beach, where his father continued to live in after the break-up of his family and was murdered. Unlike Danny, Steve is a native White Hawaiian. In several episodes, he is shown to be conversant in "bird" (Hawaiian Pidgin). As such, he was not antagonized as much as Danny was by the locals' prejudice and teasing during the first several seasons, evidenced by his friendship with Mamo and the deference shown to him even by Kapu leader Kawika and Kamekona, who affectionately calls McGarrett "the big kahuna".

Based on McGarrett's flashbacks and statements from other characters, he had a happy childhood and enjoyed spending time in the garage watching his father fix the antique 1974 Mercury Marquis. He inherited his father's passion for antique cars and occasionally drove the Marquis after fixing it up himself. He was a high school sophomore when his mother Doris was presumed to be killed in a car accident in April 1992, prompting John to send Steve and his younger sister Mary away to the mainland for their own safety. Steve was sent to boarding school while Mary went to live with John's older sister Deb. With the surfacing of crime lord Wo Fat and the theft of John's mysterious tool box after Steve's return to Hawaii, the truth behind Doris' "death" is gradually revealed; while the siblings reunite with their mother, they are still suspicious of her and consider Aunt Deb to be their maternal figure. Steve is said to be fifteen or sixteen in 1992, which roughly corresponds with the fact that he was in BUD/S in the year 2000. A star quarterback, he attended the fictional Kukui High School before being sent to the Army and Navy Academy in California for his junior and senior years after the death of his mother. This led to a decade-long period of estrangement between John and his children. In the season 6 episode "Ka Pohaku Kihi Pa'a / The Solid Cornerstone", Steve admitted that he deeply regretted not patching things up with his father when he had the chance to.

=== Military and Five-0 ===
McGarrett is a third-generation Navy veteran, and he was named after his late grandfather, Ensign Steven McGarrett, who perished on the USS Arizona during the attacks on Pearl Harbor in December 1941. His grandfather has been referenced a number of times as the younger McGarrett had met a Japanese American internee and a retired Petty Officer, both of whom knew Ensign McGarrett when he was still alive. He graduated from the United States Naval Academy and went on to have a distinguished career. Governor Jameson once outlined his resume: "Annapolis, five years Naval Intelligence, six years with the SEALs. Your superiors say that you are the best they have ever seen." McGarrett graduated from BUD/S Class 203 (in real life, Class 203 graduated in 1996, not the 2000s) at the top of his class. His time in the military is largely unknown or vague due to the highly classified nature of most of his missions, but it was mentioned that he has been deployed to Afghanistan, Iraq and North Korea, served on board the USS Enterprise, was stationed at Coronado at some point in his career and was known by the nickname "Smooth Dog". He is multilingual and is mainly conversant in Asian languages; he understands Pashto (he did several tours in Afghanistan), speaks and reads Mandarin fluently and knows conversational Korean and Japanese. He is friends with former Navy SEAL Senior Chief Petty Officer, now NCIS Special Agent Sam Hanna from NCIS: Los Angeles and former Delta Force operative turned Phoenix Foundation agent Jack Dalton from MacGyver. Due to his background in intelligence and special ops, he is well-connected to high-ranking officials in the Navy and the CIA, which he has used to his advantage on several occasions. Prior to his father's murder, he served on a "black op" with his best friend, Freddie Hart, but the mission went south and Hart was killed; his body was not recovered until Season 3 when McGarrett personally flew to North Korea to oversee the repatriation. In season 4, he admits to Lou Grover that after Hart's death, the Navy "didn't feel the same" anymore and that he jumped at the chance to leave when Governor Jameson asked him to set up the task force.

McGarrett uses the same weapons he used as a SEAL including a P226 Navy as his sidearm as well as the Heckler & Koch MP5K and MP7 sub-machine guns, and HK416 assault rifle. Besides his father's vintage Marquis, McGarrett drives a blue Chevrolet Silverado. Its license plate registration number is F6-3958, which was also used by Jack Lord's character in the original series.

In "No Ke Ali'i' Wahine A Me Ka Aina", Steve and Danny, along with an MI-6 officer (Chris Vance) are awarded the George Cross by Queen Elizabeth II for stopping a terrorist attack against Europe.

=== Characterization and relationships ===
Despite the fact that he is no longer on full-time active duty, McGarrett's military background and SEAL training are still evident in his daily routine and habits; he still takes a "Navy shower", keeps his house impeccably neat and tidy, maintains a fitness regimen and is extremely sensitive to sound even when asleep. His military mannerisms are also apparent in the way he approaches his cases, some of the lingo he uses and his ability to remain calm even when under intense pressure, and he is frequently mocked by Danny for his lack of "human" touch. In later seasons he becomes more affable around the other task force members and would be seen cracking jokes with other team members. Despite his stoicism, he has a soft spot for children, especially his adoptive niece Joan and Danny's children Grace and Charlie, both of whom often refer to him as 'Uncle Steve', and is extremely protective of his younger sister Mary.

Much of McGarrett's interaction with Danny outside of work usually begins and ends with the duo bickering over trivial matters or good-naturedly mocking one another; there is a running gag in the show where various characters would comment on how the duo bicker like an "old married couple". Although they seem like polar opposites—for example, McGarrett keeps his house neat and tidy and keeps his emotions bottled up while Danny is shown to be a slob and often vocalizes his frustrations by ranting—they form an unlikely friendship, with McGarrett mocking Danny in his deadpan humor several times about how the latter misses him secretly but refuses to admit it. Although he is often referred to as "Boss" by the other members of Five-0 and he is usually seen giving orders, he considers the other members of the team as his peers and ohana (family), as mentioned in the Season 5 premiere.

McGarrett was in a long-term on-and-off relationship with Catherine Rollins (Michelle Borth), a rekindled old flame introduced early in season 1. In season 8, it is revealed that his romantic relationship with Catherine dates back to 2002-eight years prior to the events of the pilot. Early in season 6, she leaves on a classified CIA operation before he's able to propose to her. He begins to date Lynn (Sarah Carter) later that season. Despite his ongoing relationship with Lynn, in the season seven premiere McGarrett confesses to a fellow police officer he meets in a hospital chapel that he "met the right woman but couldn't hold on to her". In a subsequent episode later that season MI6 agent Harry Langford tells Steve that his deceased wife was "the only one he ever let in" to which McGarrett replies that he "got one of those" but has "no chance of getting her back". In the season nine premiere, it is revealed that he has broken up with Lynn. In season ten, he is seen dating multiple women before eventually admitting to Danny that he is “feeling lost” and used the dating as a “distraction”.

In the series finale, McGarrett laments to new friend Lincoln Cole that Catherine was “the one who got away”. In the final moments of the series, McGarrett is seen smiling and holding Catherine's hand as they await to depart Hawaii.

McGarrett is an extremely private man who rarely shares aspects of his personal life or preferences, in contrast to Danny, who rants about anything and everything he dislikes. For example, he attempted to keep his relationship with Catherine a secret from the team for much of season 1, although Danny later stated that he knew whenever Catherine was in town from McGarrett's "stupid smile". Although used to working in a team environment, he is usually a "lone wolf" who is extremely self-reliant and has difficulty relying on others for emotional support, which was a source of concern for his Aunt Deb. Despite Danny's persistent prying, McGarrett never speaks of his military service, largely because of the classified nature of most of his missions, often brushing Danny off with "It's classified" or "I can neither confirm nor deny". He frequently displays little or no emotion in situations where Danny is extremely emotional. It is not until Season 5 that McGarrett finally explains to Danny that he was raised in a family environment where males were not encouraged to express emotion.

== See also ==
- List of Hawaii Five-0 (2010 TV series) characters
