= Pilot (Hawaii Five-0) =

- Hawaii Five-0 episode
- The new Unnamed Police State Task Force becomes used to their new office space and begins to think of a name for their team.
- Episode no.: Season 1 Episode 1
- Directed by: Len Wiseman
- Story by: Alex Kurtzman; Roberto Orci; Peter M. Lenkov
- Teleplay by: Peter M. Lenkov
- Editing by: Nick de Toth
- Production code: 101
- Original air date: September 20, 2010
- Running time: 44 minutes

Guest appearances
- Jean Smart as Governor Pat Jameson; Will Yun Lee as Sang Min; Norman Reedus as Anton Hesse; James Marsters as Victor Hesse; William Sadler as John McGarrett; Allison Chu as Chen Chi; Patrick Crowley as Co-Pilot; Teilor Grubbs as Grace Williams; Lexi Hara as Local Girl; Meagen Hensley as Jaycee; David B. Johnson as Captain DeMarco; Blaine Kia as Minister; Thomas McCurdy as Jovan Eteinne; Kelemete Misipeka as Samoan No. 1; Brendon Pave as Local Boy; Jonathan Clarke Sypert as Fred Doran; Taylor Wily as Kamekona; Sonya Seng as Car Jack Lady

Episode chronology
← Previous —	Next → "Ohana"
- Hawaii Five-0 (2010 TV series, season 1)

The pilot episode of the reimagined crime series Hawaii Five-0 premiered on CBS in the United States on September 20, 2010. The pilot's teleplay was written by Peter M. Lenkov, based on a story developed by Lenkov, Alex Kurtzman and Roberto Orci, and was directed by Len Wiseman. The episode introduces the four main characters: Alex O'Loughlin as series protagonist and Navy SEAL, Lt. Commander Steve McGarrett, Scott Caan as Steve's partner Danny Williams, a former Detective from New Jersey who moved to Hawaii to be close to his daughter, Grace, Daniel Dae Kim as Chin Ho Kelly, a disgraced HPD cop and Grace Park as Kono Kalakaua, a former surfer-turned-HPD Academy graduate who is also Chin's cousin. In the pilot, McGarrett returns to Hawaii to find Victor Hesse (James Marsters), a terrorist who murdered his father, John McGarrett. The Governor of Hawaii, Pat Jameson (Jean Smart) offers McGarrett to head a new task force to fight serious crimes by any means.

Since the end of the original Hawaii Five-O series, there had been a number of attempts to create a remake, but ultimately none went beyond the pilot stage. CBS later hired Lenkov to pitch a pilot story. Kurtzman and Orci were approached; while originally hesitant to participate in the project, they were impressed with Lenkov's pitch. The episode was filmed in March 2010 and took over two weeks to shoot. When the episode became too long certain sequences were cut from the final product, including the funeral scene with Taryn Manning as McGarrett's sister; the character would be introduced in a later episode. Almost 14.2 million Americans viewed the pilot, increasing to 17.59 million when Live+7-day digital video recordings (DVR) are taken into account, and was also considered a ratings success in other countries. Critical reactions were generally positive.

== Plot ==
The episode begins in Pohang, South Korea, where United States Navy SEAL Lieutenant Commander Steve McGarrett (Alex O'Loughlin) is transporting prisoner Anton Hesse (Norman Reedus). Anton's brother, Victor (James Marsters) calls McGarrett to announce he is holding his father, John McGarrett (William Sadler), in Honolulu, and wants to make an exchange. However, Victor is in fact tracking McGarrett's convoy; two helicopters arrive and ambush it. In the midst of the skirmish, McGarrett is forced to kill Anton when he brandishes a weapon. In response, Victor executes John.

McGarrett returns to Hawaii to attend his father's funeral, where he meets State Governor Patricia Jameson (Jean Smart). Jameson offers McGarrett to lead a new independent state police task force to apprehend Hesse and clean up the criminal underworld in the state by any means. However, McGarrett initially refuses and goes to his father's home to investigate the crime scene. While searching the house he finds that Hesse has an accomplice, and also notices a tool box marked "Champ" (in the beginning of the episode, John referred to his son as "champ" despite never calling him that before). As he takes the box, which has evidence on a case John must have wanted his son to solve, he is confronted by the lead detective in the case, Honolulu Police Department Detective Sergeant Danny Williams (Scott Caan), a divorcee from New Jersey who moved to Hawaii to be close to his daughter Grace (Teilor Grubbs) after she moved with her mother and her new husband. Despite initial friction between the two, McGarrett decides to accept Jameson's offer, and appoints a reluctant Danny as his partner. They find a lead in suspected gun runner Fred Doran (Jonathan Clarke Sypert); ballistics evidence suggests it came from a gun once owned by Doran. When they arrive at his quonset hut, he attempts to flee, but is killed by Danny following a standoff.

Initially dismayed that Danny shot the only lead to Hesse, McGarrett finds Chen Chi (Allison Chu), a smuggled immigrant from China who was sold to Doran, leading McGarrett to believe human traffickers smuggled Hesse to Hawaii. In order to find out who, McGarrett and Danny turn to Chin Ho Kelly (Daniel Dae Kim), one of John's proteges. He left the Honolulu Police Department disgraced after he was accused of corruption. After Chin Ho asserts his innocence, McGarrett offers him to join his task force. The trio meet with Chin Ho's friend, former police informant and current owner of a shave ice business Kamekona (Taylor Wily). Kamekona believes the snakehead leader is Sang Min (Will Yun Lee). In order to apprehend Sang Min, Chin Ho decides to appoint his cousin, Kono Kalakaua (Grace Park) as a plant. Kono was a former professional surfer turned police academy graduate. She goes undercover as a Chinese immigrant to meet with Sang Min. The conversation is monitored by the rest of the team through up-to-date laser audio surveillance, eliminating the need for a wire. However, it has emerged that Sang Min has a mole in HPD, who identifies Kono as a cop. The team storm the warehouse, and McGarrett apprehends Sang Min.

In the interrogation, McGarrett informs Sang Min that if he goes to prison, his Rwandan wife and son will be deported, leaving his son at the mercy of the Hutu militias. If he cooperates, McGarrett will ensure they stay in America. Sang Min reveals that Hesse is going to leave the island on a Chinese freighter. Danny and McGarrett hastily drive to the docks. They then proceed to assault the freighter, where they dispatch several of Hesse's guards. McGarrett confronts Hesse, and shoots him off the boat. At the end of the episode, the new team settle into their new office space, and cannot settle on a name for their new unit.

== Production ==
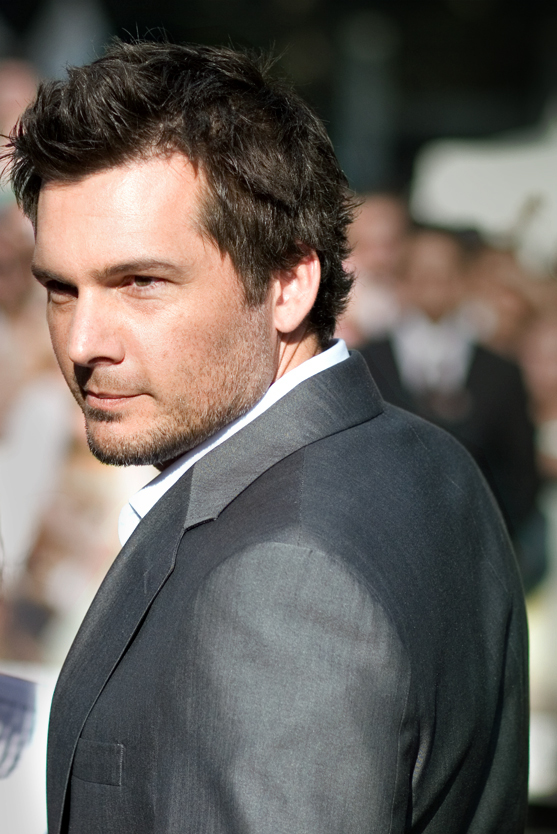
Len Wiseman directed the episode; it was his first time working on television.

=== Background and writing ===
The idea for a remake of Hawaii Five-O first came about in 1996, when CBS commissioned a sequel starring Gary Busey and Russell Wong, along with a cameo appearance by James MacArthur, who portrayed the original Danny Williams, as Danny who was promoted to the state governor. Though the pilot was produced, it was never released. Twelve years later, on August 12, 2008, CBS commissioned another sequel to Five-O, with Criminal Minds executive producer Edward Allen Bernero appointed to write the pilot. The sequel would center on Steve McGarrett's son. However the sequel was never produced.

Later, CBS approached CSI: NY writer Peter M. Lenkov to pitch a reimagined pilot of the show, as Lenkov himself was a fan of the original. When executive producers Roberto Orci and Alex Kurtzman known about the remake, the two were originally hesitant to participate, but were impressed by Lenkov's pitch, since the story had "such a great kind of paradigm for the show and how to really get into the characters that he really talked us into it." All three developed the story of the pilot, though Lenkov was the one who wrote the script. On February 19, 2010, CBS ordered the production of the pilot, with Len Wiseman chosen to direct. It was the first time Wiseman worked on a television program, and it was also the first time he used digital cinematography rather than film.

The producers discussed changing Kono to a female character. Lenkov noted that the producers did not have reservations as he initially though, but instead embraced the idea, as it would empower women in the remake by including them as main characters and not just victims or other minor characters. The pilot episode of the original series already established the Five-O task force, and when writing the pilot Lenkov wanted to give a proper introduction to the characters so that the audience can get to know them. Another difference in both the original and reimagined shows was the genre; the original was more police procedural, whereas the remake would be more action orientated, as well as some comedy mixed in, particularly from the banter between McGarrett and Danny. In the original script, there was no fighting between the two main characters, but the producers felt this would launch their partnership. Lenkov also included the return of an iconic catch phrase from the original series, "Book 'em, Danno". A table read-through of the pilot took place on February 19, 2010.

=== Casting ===
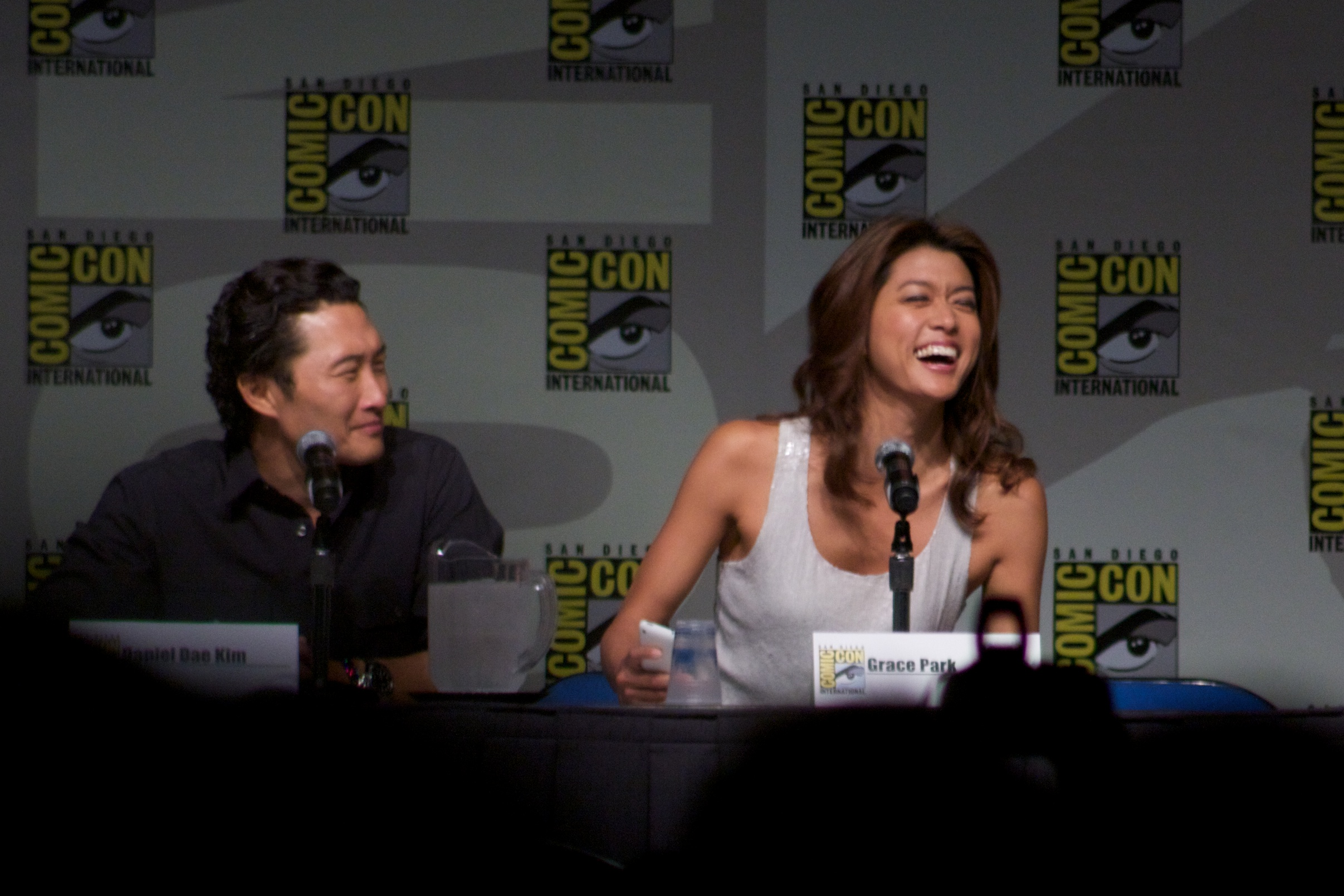
Daniel Dae Kim (left) and Grace Park (right) play cousins Chin Ho Kelly and Kono Kalakaua. It is the second time Park starred in a reimagined show, after Battlestar Galactica, in which her role was previously played by a male.

The first principal actor to be cast was Daniel Dae Kim for the role of Chin Ho Kelly. Before he was cast, Dae Kim was working on the final season of Lost, in which he portrayed regular character Jin-Soo Kwon. The actor wanted to find more work after he finished, and was offered a chance to appear on Five-0. Dae Kim spent some time with HPD officers, as well as viewing some episodes of the original series as "homework" for the character. Alex O'Loughlin was next to be cast as the main protagonist Steve McGarrett. Despite playing two series on CBS, Moonlight and Three Rivers, that were cancelled in their first year, CBS was still interested in having O'Loughlin headline another series. However, the producers initially had reservations casting the actor, until they realized his dedication towards the role. Grace Park was later cast as Kono Kalakaua. It is the second time she starred in a re-imagined television series in which her role was previously portrayed by a male in its original incarnation, the first being Battlestar Galactica in which she portrayed Sharon "Boomer" Valerii, a part that was played by Herbert Jefferson Jr. in the original series. The producers had Park in mind because of her previous role on Battlestar. The producers also felt that another male Kono would be boring for the show. Scott Caan was the last principal cast member to be cast on the show, as Danny Williams. Being cast at "the eleventh hour", the first time Caan and O'Loughlin met was during rehearsal.

In addition to the regular cast, a number of recurring characters were introduced in the pilot. Taylor Wily was introduced as confidential informant and shave ice entrepreneur Kamekona. Lenkov, who initially designed the character from Huggy Bear on Starsky & Hutch, took a liking to the actor following his audition, and was given the role. In March 2010 it was announced that Jean Smart would play state governor Pat Jameson. In the same month it was announced that James Marsters would appear in the pilot as the nemesis to McGarrett. After some speculation, in July Lenkov announced that Marsters would "most likely" return later in the season. In one of the deleted scenes of the pilot from the first season DVD boxset, an alternate ending featured Hesse swimming ashore after McGarrett shot him. Will Yun Lee was cast as Sang Min. The character was originally a one-off, but because the producers were impressed by Yun Lee's performance, he would appear in a further three episodes in the first season. In February 2010, Taryn Manning was cast as McGarrett's sister, Mary Ann, who was originally intended to appear at her father's funeral. However, her scenes were cut. Mary Ann would later be formally introduced in the fourth episode, "Lanakila".

=== Filming ===
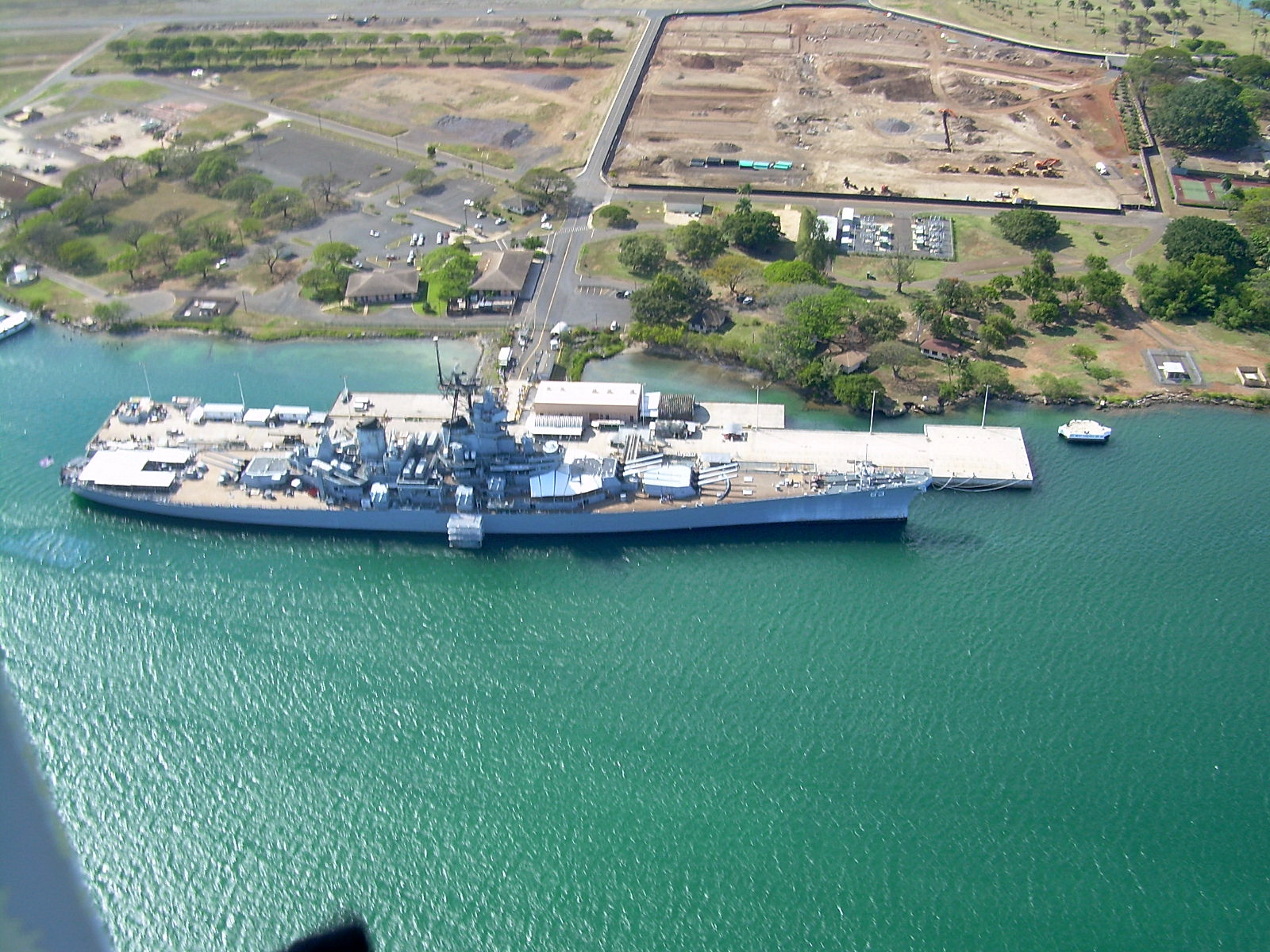
Filming began near the USS Missouri (BB-63) in Pearl Harbor.

Filming began two weeks after the readthrough, on March 5, 2010, and took over two weeks to shoot. Wiseman's direction was to film the episode like a "postcard of Hawaii," but at the same time show its darker side when the team fight the antagonists. Dae Kim's schedule overlapped between the Five-0 pilot and Lost, although at the time his character in the latter show was in the process of being killed off. The first few days of filming was affected due to bad weather conditions, particularly strong winds and sudden sporadic rain showers. The first day was spent in Pearl Harbor, near the USS Missouri (BB-63). Line producer Pat Crowley made an appearance as a helicopter pilot. The second day of filming took place at the North Shore, shooting scenes for Kono's introduction. Before filming began, Park, who had never surfed before, was taught the basics, though the scenes in which Kono surfs were mostly done by a body double. Filming was severely hindered by bad weather, forcing the production team to reschedule. Day three was spent on Kamekona's scenes.

March 10 and 11 were dedicated to the scenes in Sang Min's warehouse. The team's assault of the warehouse was filmed by three separate units. Kono's fight sequence was included to assert to the audience that she would be a valuable asset to the team. In the scene where McGarrett shoots Sang Min's Mercedes-Benz before it crashes into a shipping container was done with two separate takes, the first of which involved O'Loughlin shooting blanks into a car. The car would swerve away. The second take saw the car crash into the container with O'Loughlin away from the shot as McGarrett was in close proximity to the car. The eighth day of filming was spent in a village of quonset huts where McGarrett and Danny chase Doran. In one part of the sequence, McGarrett jumps over the trunk of one car as it was hit from behind by another car. To make the scene a reality, the film crew made a three-part composite shot to ensure no harm came to O'Loughlin.

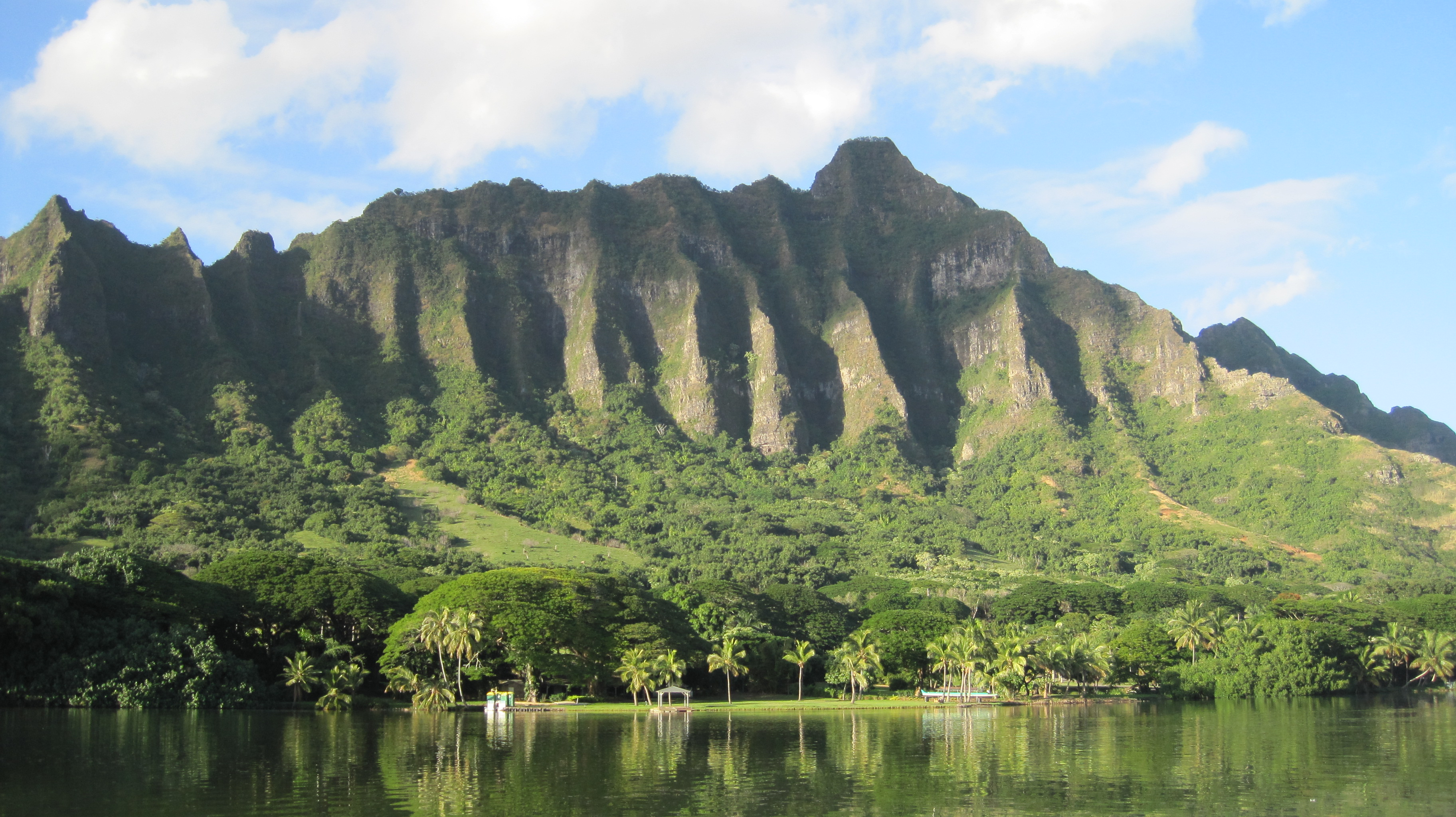
The scenes in the cold open were some of the last scenes to be shot and took place at Kualoa Ranch over the course of three days.

The tenth and eleventh filming days were spent shooting the scenes of McGarrett and Danny assaulting Hesse's freighter. The fight scene between McGarrett and Hesse were shot with the portraying actors. Stunt doubles were on hand, but the production staff found they were not needed in the fight scenes until both characters fell into a boat below or the sea. The first "Book 'em, Danno" line was filmed several times as the staff wanted to pick out the right version. Some of the last scenes to be shot were the cold open scenes. Three days were spent on those scenes, and were filmed at Kualoa Ranch. In one scene of the episode, McGarrett goes to the garage of his father's house and unravels a Mercury Marquis. The car was in fact used on the original show and was on loan to the production staff by its owner, who was the stand-in for Jack Lord, who played the original McGarrett.

=== Post-production ===
Some scenes of the episode contained backgrounds that were added with digital effects. One such scene was on Danny's ex-wife's house, which did not have mountains in the background; the mountains were digitally added in post-production. The same technique was used again on the village of quonset huts, and again on the freighter assault scenes, only with the background of the sea when Hesse and McGarrett fight. After the episode was filmed, the producers discovered that it was too long and spent two weeks deciding what to cut out. One of the scenes involved the team deciding on a name of their task force, but that scene was cut in favor of another episode. Manning's scenes were also cut due from the final broadcast to the length, though viewers could still make out the top of her head in the finished episode.

== Reception ==
=== Ratings ===
The pilot aired on CBS on September 20, 2010, during the 10 to 11 pm (ET) timeslot. It was on the 42nd anniversary of the airing of the original Hawaii Five-O pilot in 1968. The pilot episode was seen by 14.199 million viewers, with a total household rating/share of 8.9/15, and a 3.9/11 ratings/share among those aged 18 through 49. The pilot came first in its timeslot, beating the third-season premiere of ABC crime comedy-drama Castle, and the series premiere of the NBC crime series Chase. However, the 18 to 49 ratings for the pilot fell ten per cent against the eighth season premiere of CSI: Miami, which occupied the timeslot in the previous year. Regardless, the pilot became the eleventh most viewed show on American television the week it aired. Ratings for the pilot was also given a significant boost in Live+7-day digital video recording (DVR); the 18 to 49 ratings/share went up to 5.0, whereas total viewership increased to 17.587 million viewers, the largest increase of the week.

In Canada, the pilot aired on the Global Television Network on the same day and timeslot, and was watched by 2.136 million viewers, placing eleventh for the week. In Australia it was seen by 1.25 million viewers across the five major cities. It helped achieve a strong night for Network Ten. In the United Kingdom, the pilot aired alongside the following episode "ʻOhana" on February 6, 2011 on digital channel Sky1. The pilot was watched by 1.024 million viewers, placing it as the second most seen show for the channel, and sixth on all digital channels.

=== Reviews ===
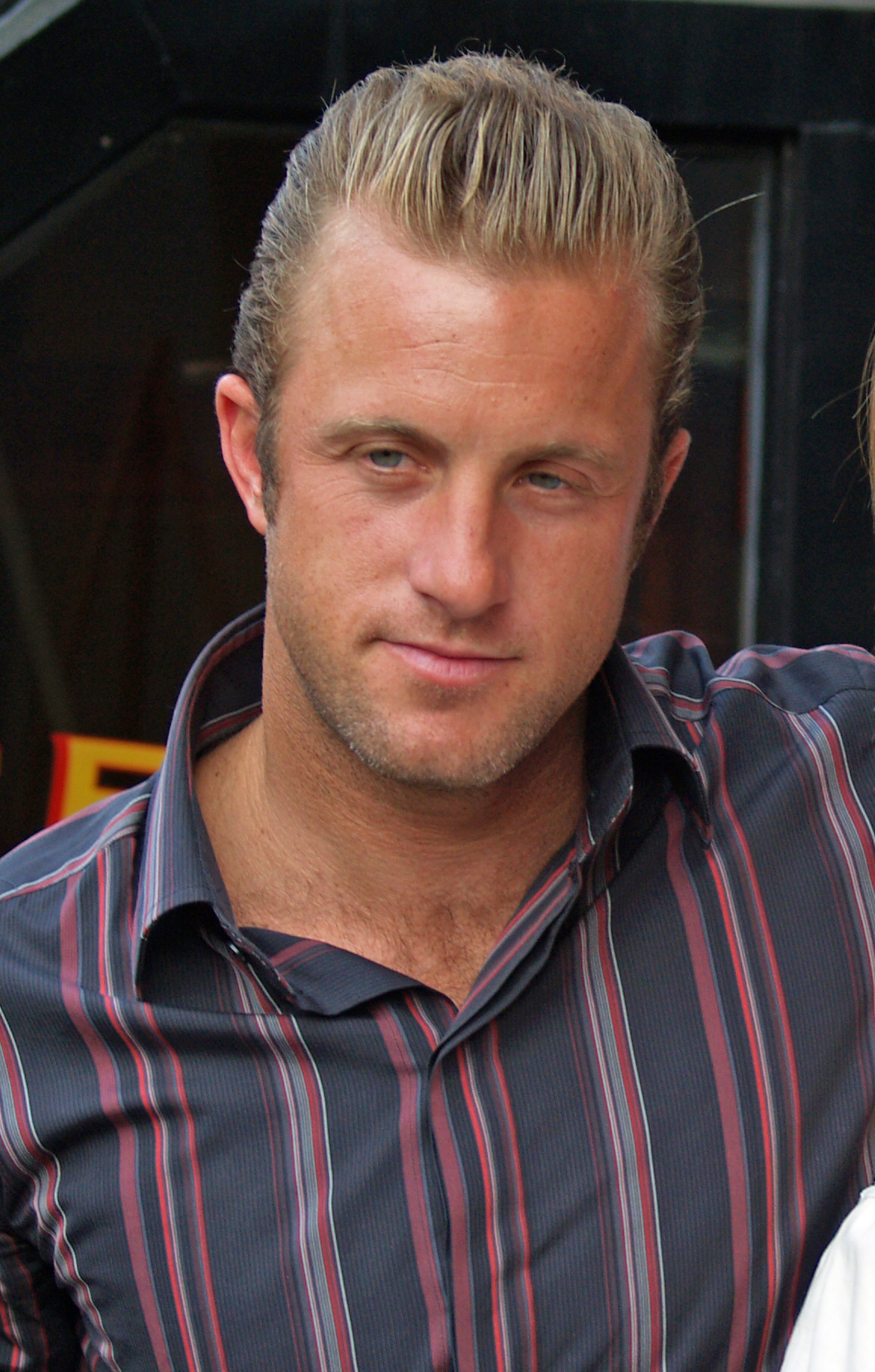
Scott Caan's (pictured) performance as Danny Williams was praised by some critics.

Critical reaction towards the pilot were generally positive. Eric Goldman of IGN rated the pilot eight out of ten. Goldman admitted that while he "never had any interest in the many stories of forensics investigators and the various bodily fluids they can use to solve crimes," he found "new series engaging and fun." Goldman particularly praised Caan's performance in the episode, stating he "is very good, bringing a lot of humor to the part and finding an easy chemistry with O'Loughlin. Per usual for this type of story, McGarrett and Danny don't get along initially and Caan is able to add a lot of charm to small moments like Danny saying to himself, 'I hate him. I hate him so much.'" However, the reviewer also enjoyed the main cast in general, stating they were a "very well cast and likable bunch and make this an easily accessible series. They're a group you want to spend more time with." Adam Sweeting of The Arts Desk stated "The refreshing thing about Five-0 (revisited) is that while it has been given a brisk 21st-century spring clean, with international terrorism, people-smuggling and a blast of ultra-modern spook technology, its uncomplicated heart still belongs to the 1970s." Sweeting added that "the good guys (and girl) are clearly identified," and "the baddies are unambiguously despicable."

A reviewer from The Honolulu Advertiser called it "A smart script," with "slick production values and maybe a splash of nostalgia got the remake of Hawaii Five-O placed on the CBS prime-time lineup this fall, but it will take more than beefcake and a remixed theme song to keep the show on the air." The piece also pointed out that times have changed since the original series left the air, citing other shows that were set in Hawaii which have come and gone. It expressed a hope that the producers will succeed in bringing a new life to the title with this remake. Ken Tucker of Entertainment Weekly graded the episode B+, calling it an "unexpected pleasure," and praised Caan for being "terrific as the moody but excellent" Danno. Tucker also believed that Kim and Park "play off each other nicely." Mary McNamara of the Los Angeles Times felt that the script was "neatly balanced between action, clever banter and serious issues," adding that it "seems poised to hold its own in the modern age." McNamara also liked O'Loughlin's performance, stating that his "limpid-eye woodenness" worked well for the role. Hanh Nguyen of Zap2it stated that it was "damn entertaining" and "visually stimulating," and enjoyed the chemistry between McGarrett and Danny.

Not all reviews were positive. David Hinkley of The New York Daily News rated the pilot three out of five stars, stating "The story and the chemistry work, but periodically the action feels rushed, as if we all know the drill and we might as well get it over with. Future episodes may correct that, because they'll need less setup work." Brian Lowry of Variety stated "On paper, "Hawaii Five-0" appears destined for can't-miss success, offering a pre-sold name, an attractive cast and a stunning location," but felt the millions spent on the pilot "doesn't necessarily indicate smooth sailing, relying as it does on playful banter (more like frat-boy hazing) between the leads that grows tiresome even before the hour's over." Ellen Gray of the Philadelphia Daily News felt it was "a huge let down," and was critical of the cast's performance, in particular O'Loughlin and Caan.

== Home video release ==
The pilot, along with the other 23 episodes from the first season, was released on a six-disc DVD and Blu-ray Disc set in the United States on September 20, 2011. The box-set had a series of deleted scenes from most episodes, including the pilot. The deleted scenes shown included Mary Ann during John's funeral, Chin Ho interrogating an underaged shoplifter, and Hesse waking up on shore. The episode also contained an audio commentary track by Peter M. Lenkov, Len Wiseman and Roberto Orci, along with its own featurette entitled Picture Perfect – The Making of the Pilot.
