= Hawaii Five-O (1968 TV series) season 12 =

Hawaii Five-O
- Season 12
- No. of episodes: 19

Release
- Original network: CBS
- Original release: October 4, 1979 – April 5, 1980

Season chronology
- ← Previous; Season 11

This is a list of episodes from the twelfth and final season of Hawaii Five-O. Main cast members for the final season are Jack Lord (as Steve McGarrett), Herman Wedemeyer (as Edward "Duke" Lukela), William Smith (as James "Kimo" Carew), Moe Keale (as Moe "Truck" Kealoha) and Sharon Farrell (as Lori Wilson).

== Broadcast history ==
The season originally aired Thursdays at 9:00-10:00 pm (EST) from October 4 to November 29, 1979, Tuesdays at 9:00-10:00 pm (EST) from December 4, 1979 to January 15, 1980 and Saturdays at 9:00-10:00 pm (EST) from March 1 to April 5, 1980

== DVD release ==
The season was released on DVD by Paramount Home Video.

== Episodes ==
No. overall	No. in season	Title	Directed by	Written by	Original release date	Prod. code
264	1	"A Lion in the Streets"	Reza Badiyi	Robert Janes	October 4, 1979	1310-1729-0905
A hotly-contested union election leads to major trouble for McGarrett and Duke, while police officer James "Kimo" Carew (William Smith) comes to the islands looking for his wife's murderer. Ross Martin, Paul L. Smith, Harry Guardino and Barbara Luna guest stars. NOTE: Shown in syndication in two parts.
265	2	"Who Says Cops Don't Cry?"	Jack Lord	Robert Janes	October 11, 1979	1310-1729-0901
A Honolulu policewoman (Sharon Farrell) watches in horror as robbers gun down her husband, a fellow officer who was about to join Five-O. This prompts her to seek justice at any cost. Alan Fudge and Darrell Fetty guest stars.
266	3	"Though the Heavens Fall"	Harry F. Hogan III	Frank Telford	October 18, 1979	1310-1729-0913
McGarrett has to cope with the activities of a white-collar club whose members claim to be dedicated to justice, since he has few reasons to consider them other than vigilantes taking the law into their own hands. Robert Reed, Michael Strong, Dennis Patrick and Elyssa Davalos guest stars.
267	4	"Sign of the Ram"	Ralph Levy	Sam Roeca	October 25, 1979	1310-1729-0909
An astrologer (Jayne Meadows) warns a heavyweight to hang up his gloves after his owner is murdered. Anthony Ponzini and Eddie Firestone guest stars.
268	5	"Good Help is Hard to Find"	Beau van den Ecker	Frank Telford	November 1, 1979	1310-1729-0910
Crime boss Tony Alika (Ross Martin) is determined to discredit the Five-O team by making them look like the Keystone Cops at any opportunity. John P. Ryan and Jason Evers guest stars. NOTE: Final appearance of the character Tony Alika (Ross Martin).
269	6	"Image of Fear"	Herbert Hirschman	James Schmerer	November 8, 1979	1310-1729-0908
A divorcée (Linda Marsh) is haunted by an intruder (Soon-Tek Oh) she thought she killed. Katy Kurtzman and Guy Boyd guest stars.
270	7	"Use a Gun, Go to Hell"	Ed Abroms	Sam Roeca	November 29, 1979	1310-1729-0914
The team must track down a handgun that was used to murder a senator, only to leave a trail of death and anguish as it passes from one possessor to another. Andrew Duggan, Paul Koslo, Jack Stauffer and Richard Dimitri guest stars.
271	8	"Voice of Terror"	Beau van den Ecker	Frank Telford	December 4, 1979	1310-1729-0916
Political terrorists wound a police officer and threaten to torture his partner unless their demands are met. Cal Bellini and Kaz Garas guest stars.
272	9	"A Shallow Grave"	Dennis Donnelly	Robert and Esther Mitchell	December 11, 1979	1310-1729-0915
A thief's release from prison coincides with the arrival of a student who has psychic visions of the theft. John David Carson, John Ireland, John Zenda and Bill Edwards. NOTE: This was Sharon Farrell's final episode to be filmed.
273	10	"The Kahuna"	Robert L. Morrison	James Menzies	December 18, 1979	1310-1729-0912
When two healthy young people die mysteriously, local traditions prevent autopsies. A strange conspiracy is gradually uncovered when Truck seems to fall under the power of a kahuna. Cathy Lee Crosby guest stars.
274	11	"Labyrinth"	Barry Crane	S : Paul Playdon; T : Michael Janover	December 25, 1979	1310-1729-0904
A million-dollar kidnap case turns bizarre as Five-O delves into the past of a victim (Tricia O'Neil) and her plastic surgeon husband (James Olson). Lyle Bettger and Ted Hamilton guest stars.
275	12	"School for Assassins"	Don Weis	S : Carey Wilber; S/T : Frank Telford	January 1, 1980	1310-1729-0919
McGarrett and Kimo must stop a gang of trained assassins from disrupting a meeting of energy ministers. Monte Markham, Lloyd Bochner, Gary Lockwood and Pamela Susan Shoop guest stars.
276	13	"For Old Times Sake"	Dennis Donnelly	S : Susan Wakeford; T : Ben Masselink	January 8, 1980	1310-1729-0917
An aging counterfeiter (Peter Bromilow) decides to use counterfeit printing plates he made to raise cash for a charitable home, but fails to realize the trouble that this will cause. Neva Patterson and Kelly Preston (her first television credit; credited as Kelly Palzis) guest stars.
277	14	"The Golden Noose"	Beau van den Ecker	George F. Slavin	January 15, 1980	1310-1729-0922
A mercenary (Ed Lauter) plans a heist as part of his scheme to take over an Asian nation.
278	15	"The Flight of the Jewels"	Don Weis	James Menzies	March 1, 1980	1310-1729-0921
A group of college students use armed radio-controlled model airplanes to steal the queen's jewels from a museum. Jeff Daniels (his first television credit) and Linwood Boomer guest star.
279	16	"Clash of Shadows"	Ralph Levy	George F. Slavin	March 8, 1980	1310-1729-0918
The disappearance of a Nazi hunter (George DiCenzo) leads to the exposure of a Nazi war criminal (Albert Paulsen). Elaine Giftos, Lloyd Bochner and Lou Richards guest stars.
280	17	"A Bird in Hand..."	Beau van den Ecker	Sam Roeca	March 22, 1980	1310-1729-0920
Bird watchers become targets for murder after taking pictures of an abandoned sugar mill. John Dehner and Lara Parker guest stars.
281	18	"The Moroville Covenant"	Robert L. Morrison	Seeleg Lester	March 29, 1980	1310-1729-0903
After a blackmailer is murdered, the team believes that the person he was blackmailing, a senatorial candidate (Paul Burke) is a suspect.
282	19	"Woe to Wo Fat"	Barry Crane	Frank Telford	April 5, 1980	1310-1729-0923
McGarrett poses as a scientist and allows himself to be kidnapped, setting up his final confrontation with his nemesis, Wo Fat (Khigh Dhiegh).
