= Matt Wheeler =

British screenwriter and producer

Matt Wheeler (also known as Matt J. L. Wheeler) is a British screenwriter and producer who has worked in television and film.

== Education ==
Wheeler graduated from Cambridge University with a 3rd class degree in English literature, before attending the UCLA School of Theater, Film and Television where he gained an MFA in screenwriting. He was awarded the BAFTA scholarship, and in addition to winning the 2010 UCLA showcase competition, he also received the Samuel Goldwyn Award.

== Works ==
Wheeler adapted "The Informant" for Sony (based on the Thomas Perry novel) and "Tin Men" for Warner Brothers, as well as writing the screenplay for the 2016 film Who Gets the Dog?, starring Alicia Silverstone.

In 2015, he joined CBS's Hawaii Five-0, where he worked for five seasons, with writing credits on 32 episodes. For seasons 9 and 10, Wheeler was a co-showrunner. Wheeler wrote the pilot and co-created the summer event series, Salvation, which premiered on CBS in July 2017.
