= Kimee Balmilero =

American actress

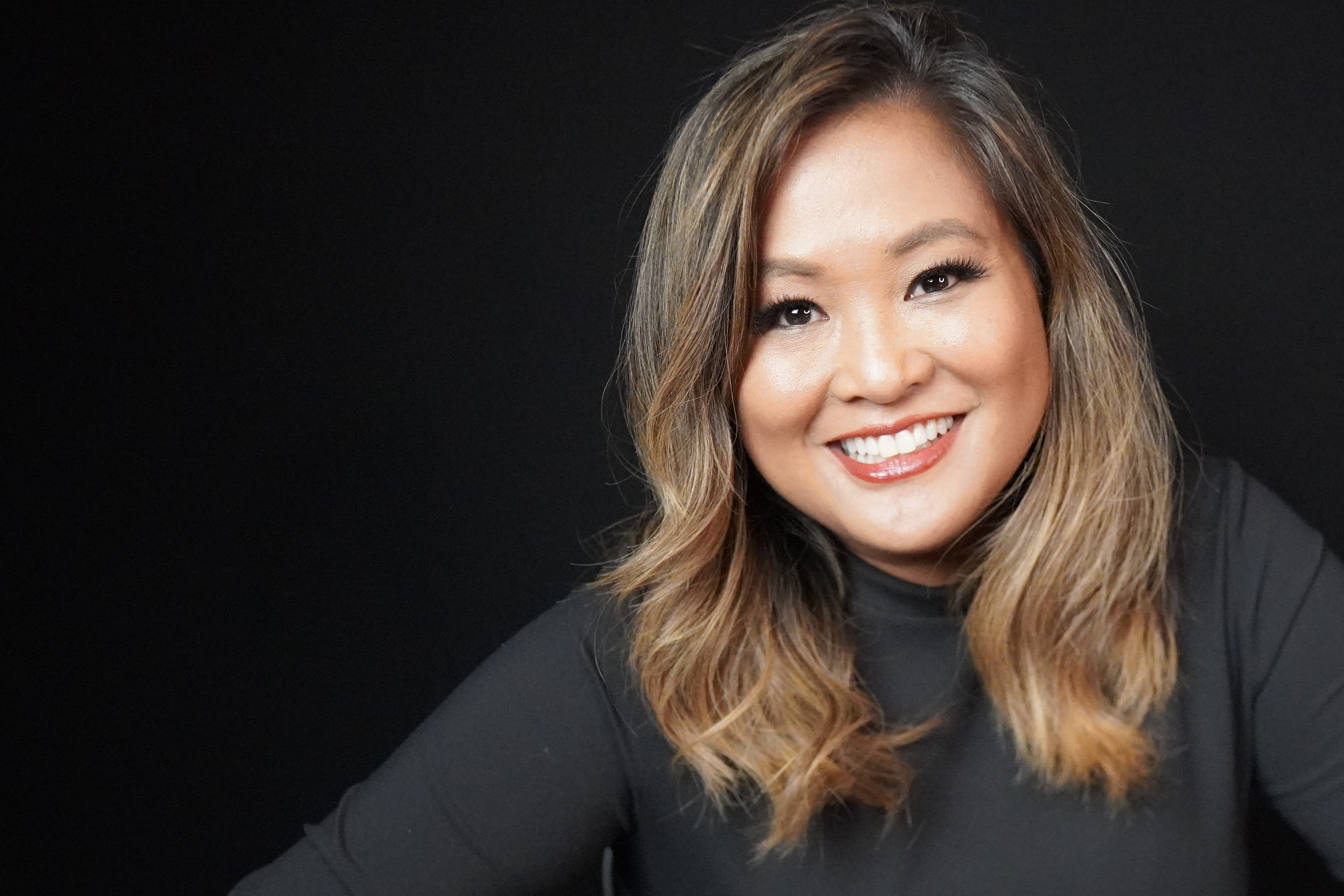
- Kimee Balmilero 2025 Tiny Stage Hawaii
- Occupations: Stage, film, television actress, singer
- Years active: 1999–present
- Website: kimeeb.com

Kimee Balmilero is an American actress and singer.

== Early life and education ==
Of Filipino descent, she is the daughter of Roy Balmilero who appears in Hawaii Five-0 portrayed as Noelani's father Joseph Cunha. Balmilero graduated from James B. Castle High School, home of the Castle Performing Arts Center on Oahu.

== Career ==
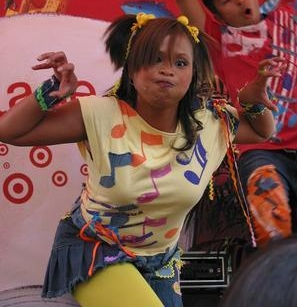
Balmilero performs at a Hi-5 concert.

Balmilero left Hawaii at 17 and joined the second national touring company of Miss Saigon. After touring for almost three years she moved to San Francisco to study at Studio A.C.T. for six months. Balmilero then moved to New York City and was part of the Original Broadway Cast of Mamma Mia!

In 2003, Balmilero joined the three-time Emmy-nominated TV series Hi-5, the American counterpart to the Australian kid's show of the same name.

== Filmography ==
=== Film ===
Year	Title	Role	Notes
1999	Amazing Journey	Herself	Documentary
2004	Hi-5, Vol 2: Music Magic	Herself	Video
2004	Hi-5, Vol. 3: Game Time	Herself	Video
2006	Hi-5: Move Your Body	Herself	Video
2006	Hi-5: Action Heroes	Herself	Video
2007	Hi-5: Making Music	Herself	Video
2007	Hi-5: Wonderful Wishes	Herself	Video
2008	Hi-5: Animal Adventures, Vol. 5	Herself	Video
2008	Hi-5: Summer Rainbows	Herself	Video
2008	Hi-5 Hits	Herself	Video
2008	Brown Soup Thing	Maria Mansalud	
2010	Hi-5: Best of Jenn	Herself	Video
2011	Let's Talk About It	N/A	Short; also producer
2011	Diagnosis Total Eclipse	Doctor	Short; also producer and editor
2013	Slow Night	Marie	Short
2013	Hung	N/A	Video short; also producer, editor, director and writer
2016	Mike and Dave Need Wedding Dates	Weird Girl No. 1 (Uncredited)	
2018	Stoke	Maggie Paras	
2022	Two Tickets to Paradise	Kailani	Television film

=== Television ===
Year	Title	Role	Notes
2002	The 54th Annual Tony Awards	Herself	Television special
2003–2006	Hi-5	Herself	70 episodes
2005–2006	Today	Herself	Episodes: June 12, 2006 and June 28, 2005
2007	Live! With Kelly	Herself	July 19, 2007
2009	The Battery's Down	Door Girl	Episode: "I Think I'm Gonna Like it Here"
2010	Pretty Little Liars	Beth	Episode: "The Jenna Thing"
2010	General Hospital	Tina	Episodes #1.12125 and #1.12126
2012	Hawaii Five-0	Allison	Episode: "Kupale"
2016–2020	Hawaii Five-0	Dr. Noelani Cunha	Series Regular: 66 Episodes
2018–2021	Magnum P.I.	Dr. Noelani Cunha	Recurring role: 16 episodes
2021; 2023	Doogie Kameāloha, M.D.	Jenny	2 episodes

=== Video games ===
Year	Title	Role	Notes	Source
2024	Like a Dragon: Infinite Wealth	Additional voices		
