= Taylor Wily =

American actor (1968–2024)

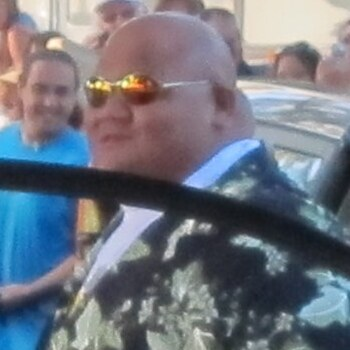
- Wily in 2011

Personal information
- Born: Taylor Tuli Wily; June 14, 1968 Honolulu, Hawaii, U.S.
- Died: June 20, 2024 (aged 56) Hurricane, Utah, U.S.
- Height: 6 ft 2 in (1.88 m)
- Weight: 450 lb (200 kg)

Sport
- Sport: Sumo
- Retired: July 1989
- Heya: Azumazeki
- Record: 57–27–14
- Debut: March 1987
- Highest rank: Makushita 2 (March 1989)
- Championships: 1 (Makushita); 1 (Jonidan); 1 (Jonokuchi)

Taylor Tuli Wily (June 14, 1968 – June 20, 2024) was an American actor, sumo wrestler and mixed martial artist. He competed in UFC where he was billed as Teila Tuli and also competed in sumo wrestling. As an actor, he was known for his recurring role as Kamekona Tupuola on both Hawaii Five-0 and Magnum P.I.

== Early life ==
Wily was born in Honolulu, Hawaii, on June 14, 1968, to Kuinise Wily and Levaosina Alo. He was of American Samoan descent. He first went to Kahuku High School, but transferred to Farrington High School and played for the high school gridiron football team where he earned the nickname "Big T". At the time he weighed 396 pounds (180 kg) and played tackle. He later played for the semi-professional Kauai Enforcers, a grid-iron football team on the island of Kauai.

== Sumo career ==
In March 1987, Wily was recruited by former sekiwake Takamiyama Daigorō, another Hawaiian, and joined Azumazeki stable, which Takamiyama had founded the previous year. He was given the shikona (ring name) of Takamishū Daikichi (高見州 大吉). In a 2016 interview with Sherdog he remarked on his first bout saying "I won a case of Spam and some rice, and that was it, I was into sumo."

He was unbeaten in his first 14 official bouts, winning two consecutive yūshō or tournament championships. Weighing nearly 440 lb (200 kg) and at 6 feet 2 inches, he was one of the largest wrestlers in sumo. In March 1988, he was promoted to the third highest makushita division, and became the first foreign-born wrestler to ever win the championship in that division. In the same month, future yokozuna Akebono Tarō, also from Hawaii, joined the Azumazeki stable. As the highest-ranking wrestler in the stable, he was a mentor to Akebono and gave him advice on how to adjust to life in Japan. In March 1989, he was at the rank of makushita (top junior division) and competed Spring Grand Sumo Tournament in Osaka, Japan. Takamishū (Wily) was never to reach sekitori status himself.

He did not compete in the following tournament, and retired from sumo in July 1989 due to knee problems.

== Sumo career record ==
Takamishū Daikichi
Year	January Hatsu basho, Tokyo	March Haru basho, Osaka	May Natsu basho, Tokyo	July Nagoya basho, Nagoya	September Aki basho, Tokyo	November Kyūshū basho, Fukuoka
1987	x	(Maezumo)	East Jonokuchi #7; 7–0; Champion	East Jonidan #48; 7–0–P; Champion	East Sandanme #49; 4–3	West Sandanme #31; 5–2
1988	East Sandanme #10; 4–3	East Makushita #55; 7–0; Champion	East Makushita #10; 2–5	West Makushita #23; 4–3	East Makushita #16; 5–2	West Makushita #8; 5–2
1989	West Makushita #4; 4–3	East Makushita #2; 3–4	East Makushita #6; 0–0–7	East Makushita #46; Retired; 0–0–7	x	x
Record given as wins–losses–absences Top division champion Top division runner-up Retired Lower divisions Non-participation Sanshō key: F=Fighting spirit; O=Outstanding performance; T=Technique Also shown: ★=Kinboshi; P=Playoff(s); Divisions: Makuuchi — Jūryō — Makushita — Sandanme — Jonidan — Jonokuchi Makuuchi ranks: Yokozuna — Ōzeki — Sekiwake — Komusubi — Maegashira

== Ultimate Fighting Championship ==
After leaving sumo, Wily went to New Japan Pro Wrestling in September 1990 and joined Tatsumi Fujinami's stable, Dragon Bombers, as a trainee, alongside fellow former sumo Nankairyū Tarō. However, the stable dissolved in 1992 and he left NJPW. He continued his training, which evolved into mixed martial arts, preparing him for the first-ever Ultimate Fighting Championships. He adopted the name "Teila Tuli" that he was billed for during the competition. He explained his reasoning saying "They didn't want me to come with such an English name," he said. "So I took Taylor and spelled it the way we spell it here in Polynesia, Teila, and used my middle name, Tuli, and got rid of Wily."

He competed in the first bout of the UFC 1 in November 1993, facing savate expert Gerard Gordeau. This was the first UFC fight on broadcast television as a previous match had not been broadcast. Tuli rushed forward, but lost his balance and was met with a brutal kick to the head that knocked a few of his teeth out, and a punch that broke Gordeau's hand, with the referee stopping the fight as a TKO win for Gordeau. Reportedly, several teeth were lodged in Gordeau's foot, while another landed in the audience. This was Tuli's only MMA fight. Afterwards he suffered from blurred vision in one eye for several years.

The match has been described as one of the top five David and Goliath match-ups in MMA history.

== Return to sumo ==
Wily returned briefly to amateur competitions in 1994, to win the Hawaii State Sumo Championship held in Bishop Museum beating Kenna Heffernan. At the time he weighed 425 lb (193 kg) and was hoping to become a prison guard. In 1995, he also took part in the World Sumo Championship in Tokyo, competing with the United States team, which placed second.

== Mixed martial arts record ==
Professional record breakdown
1 match	0 wins	1 loss
By knockout	0	1
By submission	0	0
By decision	0	0

Res.	Record	Opponent	Method	Event	Date	Round	Time	Location	Notes
Loss	0–1	Gerard Gordeau	TKO (head kick)	UFC 1	November 12, 1993	1	0:26	Denver, United States	First televised fight in UFC history

== Acting career ==
Wily appeared as an extra in Magnum, P.I.'s 1982 season, which was his first appearance. He also had small roles on the television series North Shore and One West Waikiki. Wily had a role in the comedy film Forgetting Sarah Marshall as a hotel worker who befriended the main character played by Jason Segel. He also appeared in the 2017 film Radical.

He had a recurring role on the television series Hawaii Five-0 where he played Kamekona who was both an informant and an entrepreneur. Throughout the series, the character would hold various jobs, such as running a helicopter tours company, a shave ice company, or running a shrimp truck. "It's the best job in the world—you get to play Hollywood but be right here in Hawaii," he said. He also made cameo appearances playing the same character in the reboot series Magnum, P.I. and MacGyver.

Wily made a cameo on the 20th edition of The Amazing Race and handed out clues to racing contestants.

He also appeared as a sumo wrestler in "Battle of the Titans", an episode of One West Waikiki, another TV show filmed in Hawaii.

=== Select filmography ===
Year	Film/Series	Role	Note
2004	North Shore	Bartender	"Ties That Bind"
2008	Forgetting Sarah Marshall	Kemo	
2010–2020	Hawaii Five-0	Kamekona Tupuola	171 episodes
2012	The Amazing Race 20	Cameo	12th Leg
2017	MacGyver	Kamekona Tupuola	
2018–2020	Magnum P.I.	Kamekona Tupuola	7 episodes

== Death ==
Wily died in Hurricane, Utah, on June 20, 2024, at the age of 56. His death was announced by host Lina Girl Langi during the show Island Life Live. According to his manager, he died of natural causes. He was married and had a daughter and a son. Peter M. Lenkov and Andre Jackson posted tributes to him online.

== See also ==
- Glossary of sumo terms
- List of past sumo wrestlers
