= Peter M. Lenkov =

Canadian writer, producer and author (born 1964)

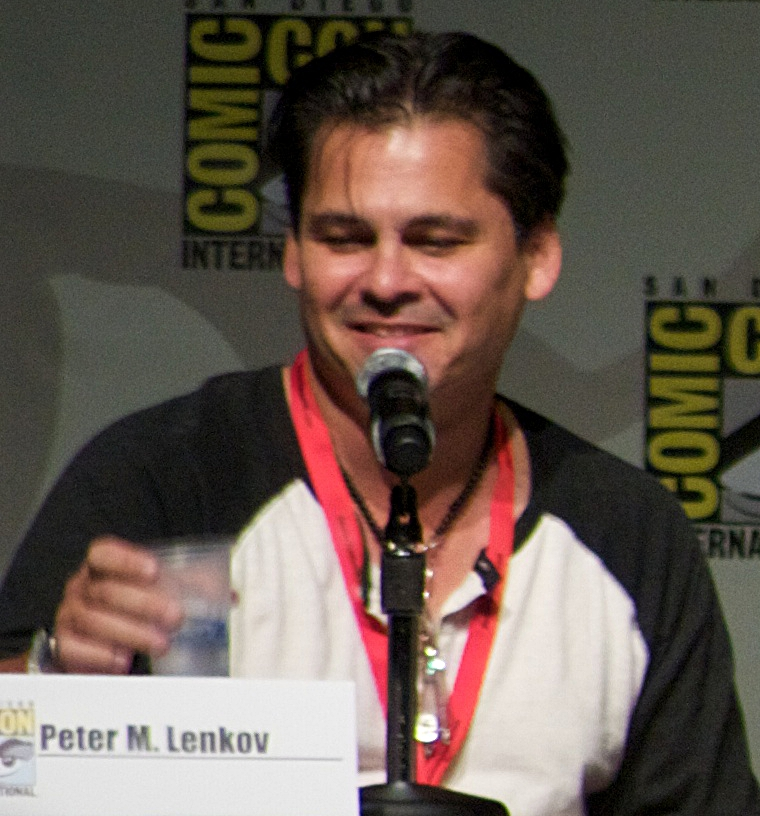
- Lenkov in 2010
- Born: 9 May 1964 (age 62); Montreal, Quebec, Canada
- Education: Concordia University
- Occupations: Writer, producer
- Years active: 1990–present
- Notable work: Hawaii Five-0; MacGyver; Magnum P.I.
- Spouse: Audie England
- Children: 4

Peter M. Lenkov (born 9 May 1964) is a Canadian television and film writer, producer, and comic book author. He is best known as the developer and showrunner of the CBS reboot series Hawaii Five-0, MacGyver, and Magnum P.I., until his firing in July 2020.

== Early life ==
Lenkov was born in Montreal, Quebec, Canada in 1964 and he studied film at Concordia University in the 1980s. His family includes a younger brother, Jeff, who is a California-based lawyer, sports agent and professor.

== Career and awards ==
Lenkov's notable work includes the TV series La Femme Nikita, Hawaii Five-0, 24 and CSI: NY and films such as R.I.P.D., Demolition Man and Son in Law.

In comics, he wrote R.I.P.D. and Fort: Prophet of the Unexplained, for which he was nominated for the Bram Stoker Award for Best Illustrated Narrative. In 2005, he was nominated for an Emmy Award for his work on the hit TV series 24. In 2009, he wrote an episode of CSI: NY for which acclaimed actor Ed Asner was nominated for an Emmy for Guest Star. In 2011, Hawaii Five-0 was awarded Best New Drama at the People's Choice Awards. Other awards include a CAPE Award for Best Drama for Hawaii Five-0, a Media Access Award for his work on CSI: NY and a Huntington Disease Honor for an episode of The District.

In 2010, Lenkov launched his reboot of the long-running CBS series Hawaii Five-0, which formerly aired on CBS and in over 200 countries around the world. He also created "Metajets" and "Kung Fu Dino Posse", two new animated TV shows. Lenkov was a co-executive producer on the Franco-Belgian television film, XIII: The Conspiracy, based on the popular graphic novel and video game by the same name, which aired in the United States on NBC as a two-part miniseries. XIII: The Conspiracy stars Stephen Dorff and Val Kilmer. The film served as a pilot for a cable TV series XIII: The Series which began airing in 2011. In 2011, a feature film based on R.I.P.D. began shooting. R.I.P.D. starred Jeff Bridges, Ryan Reynolds and Kevin Bacon, and was released by Universal in summer 2013. In 2011, he signed a deal with CBS TV Studios.

From 2022 to 2024, Lenkov was the executive producer of five feature films: The Wind & the Reckoning, Shelter in Solitude, Marlowe, R.I.P.D. 2: Rise of the Damned and BANG. Lenkov is also developing numerous properties, including writing a new graphic novel.

In 2021, Lenkov also purchased a minority interest in several minor league sports teams.

=== Allegations and termination ===
Lenkov was fired from his CBS shows on 7 July 2020 due to reports that he fostered a "toxic work environment" and his overall deal with CBS TV Studios was terminated. MacGyver star Lucas Till reported being suicidal due to Lenkov's body shaming.

== Credits ==
=== Writer ===
- Demolition Man (1993)
- Son in Law (1993)
- Universal Soldier II: Brothers in Arms (1998)
- Universal Soldier III: Unfinished Business (1998)
- Dr. Jekyll and Mr. Hyde (1999)
- Ballistic: Ecks vs. Sever (2002; uncredited rewrites)

=== Producer ===
- Son in Law (1993)
- Jury Duty (1995)
- Chairman of the Board (1998)
- Ballistic: Ecks vs. Sever (2002)
- Pursued (2003)
- XIII (2008)
- The Wind & the Reckoning (2022)
- Marlow (2022)
- R.I.P.D. 2: Rise of the Damned (2022)
- Shelter in Solitude (2023)
- BANG (2024)

=== TV ===
==== Writer/producer ====
Year	Title	Credited as				Network
Year	Title	Creator	Writer	Executive Producer	Producer	Network
1990	Parker Kane	No	No	No	Yes	N/A
1991	Haunted Lives: True Ghost Stories	No	Yes	No	No	CBS; UPN
1994	The Crow: Stairway to Heaven	No	Yes	No	No	Syndication
1997	La Femme Nikita	No	Yes	No	supervising	USA Network
1998	Ghost Stories	No	Yes	No	No	The Family Channel
1999	The Hunger	No	Yes	No	No	Showtime
2000	Level 9	No	Yes	No	supervising	UPN
2000	Tracker	No	Yes	co-executive	No	N/A
2000	The District	No	Yes	co-executive supervising	No	CBS
2004–2005	24: Day 4	No	Yes	co-executive	No	Fox
2005–2013	CSI: NY	No	Yes	Yes	No	CBS
2010–2020	Hawaii Five-0	Yes	Yes	Yes	No	CBS
2016–2020	MacGyver	Yes	Yes	Yes	No	CBS
2017–2018	Salvation	No	No	Yes	No	CBS
2018–2021	Magnum P.I.	Yes	Yes	Yes	No	CBS

==== Writer (animated) ====
- Metajets (2009)
- Kung Fu Dino Posse (2009)

=== Comics ===
- Fort: Prophet of the Unexplained (with Frazer Irving, 4-part mini-series, Dark Horse Comics, 2003 ISBN 1-56971-781-8 Titan Books, 2003 ISBN 1-84023-579-9)
- R.I.P.D. (1999)
