= List of Magnum P.I. (2018 TV series) episodes =

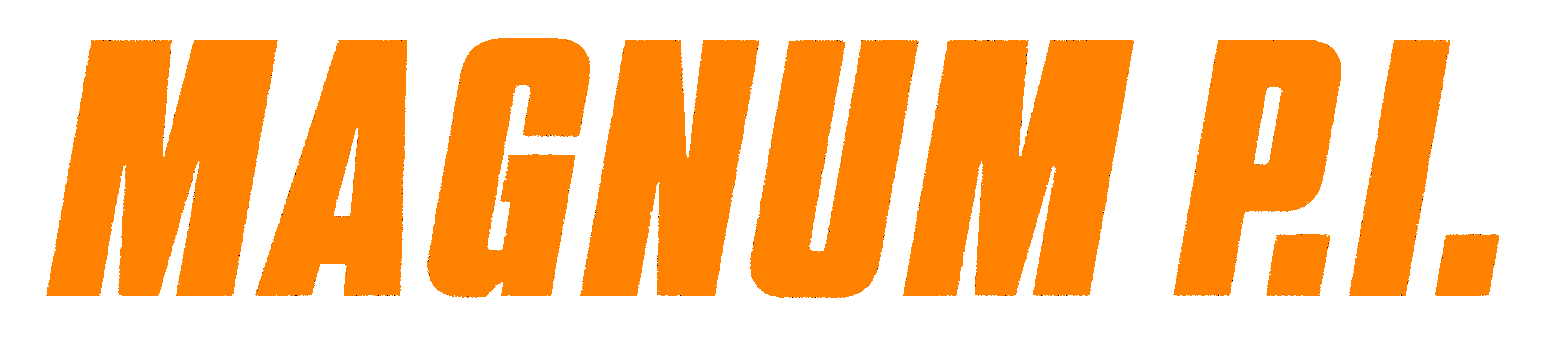

Magnum P.I. is an American action and crime drama television series developed by Peter M. Lenkov and Eric Guggenheim for CBS. The program is a reboot of the 1980–1988 show of the same name, which was created by Donald P. Bellisario and Glen A. Larson. The series features Jay Hernandez in the titular role of Thomas Magnum, originally made famous by Tom Selleck. Magnum is a private investigator and former Navy SEAL who solves crimes in Hawaii. The remainder of the cast is made up of Perdita Weeks as Juliet Higgins (a role which was gender flipped from Jonathan Higgins in the original series), Zachary Knighton as Orville "Rick" Wright, Stephen Hill as Theodore "T.C." Calvin, Amy Hill as Kumu Tuileta, and Tim Kang as Honolulu Police Department Detective Gordon Katsumoto.

The first season premiered on September 24, 2018, and ran until April 1, 2019. A second season was split into two parts, with the first airing from September 27, 2019, to January 31, 2020, before continuing on April 10, 2020, and ultimately concluding on May 8, 2020. Season three was delayed as a result of the COVID-19 pandemic. As a result, it had a reduced episode count. It began broadcasting on December 4, 2020, and its finale aired on May 7, 2021. The penultimate season transmitted from October 1, 2021 – May 6, 2022. Despite Magnum P.I. being a top-25 rated series, CBS cancelled the show six days later as a cost-cutting measure. Following negotiations with the studio, NBC picked the program up for an additional 20 episodes to be split over two seasons. They later made the decision to market the order as a two-part fifth and final season rather than a 10-episode fifth and sixth seasons, so that the studio wouldn't have to pay the actors a higher salary, which would be required if it was called a sixth season. Part 1 was broadcast from February 19 to April 23, 2023. Two months later, NBC cancelled the series as the performers' contracts were set to expire and they were unsure when production would continue as a result of the 2023 Writers Guild of America strike. The second part began airing on October 4, 2023, and concluded with a two-hour finale on January 3, 2024.

Magnum P.I. shares a fictional universe with the 2010 reboot of Hawaii Five-O, and the 2016 reboot of MacGyver; Magnum P.I. had a crossover event with the former in 2020. The three shows are collectively referred to as the Lenkov-verse as they are all developed by Lenkov; Guggenheim was also a co-showrunner on Hawaii Five-0 from 2016 to 2018.

During the course of the series, 96 episodes of Magnum P.I. aired over five seasons, between September 24, 2018, and January 3, 2024.

== Series overview ==
Series overview for Magnum P.I.
Season	Episodes		Originally released			Average viewership (in millions)
Season	Episodes		First released	Last released	Network	Average viewership (in millions)
1	20		September 24, 2018	April 1, 2019	CBS	5.99
2	20	14	September 27, 2019	January 31, 2020	CBS	6.67
2	20	6	April 10, 2020	May 8, 2020	CBS	6.67
3	16		December 4, 2020	May 7, 2021	CBS	5.59
4	20		October 1, 2021	May 6, 2022	CBS	5.24
5	20	10	February 19, 2023	April 23, 2023	NBC	3.35
5	20	10	October 4, 2023	January 3, 2024	NBC	3.31

== Episodes ==
=== Season 1 (2018–19) ===
List of Magnum P.I. season 1 episodes
No. overall	No. in season	Title	Directed by	Written by	Original release date	Prod. code	US viewers (millions)
1	1	"I Saw the Sun Rise"	Justin Lin	Peter M. Lenkov & Eric Guggenheim	September 24, 2018	MPI101	8.12
2	2	"From the Head Down"	Karen Gaviola	Peter M. Lenkov & Eric Guggenheim	October 1, 2018	MPI102	6.23
3	3	"The Woman Who Never Died"	Sylvain White	Joe Gazzam	October 8, 2018	MPI103	6.08
4	4	"Six Paintings, One Frame"	Antonio Negret	Ashley Gable	October 15, 2018	MPI104	5.48
5	5	"Sudden Death"	David Grossman	David Fury	October 22, 2018	MPI106	5.63
6	6	"Death is Only Temporary"	Duane Clark	Gene Hong & Scarlett Lacey	October 29, 2018	MPI105	5.69
7	7	"The Cat Who Cried Wolf"	Eagle Egilsson	Neil Tolkin	November 5, 2018	MPI107	5.27
8	8	"Die He Said"	Peter Weller	Joe Gazzam	November 12, 2018	MPI108	5.50
9	9	"The Ties That Bind"	Ron Underwood	Ashley Gable	November 19, 2018	MPI109	5.39
10	10	"Bad Day to be a Hero"	Lin Oeding	Ashley Charbonnet	December 10, 2018	MPI110	5.47
11	11	"Nowhere to Hide"	Mark Tinker	Story by : Peter M. Lenkov; Teleplay by : Joe Gazzam	January 14, 2019	MPI112	6.02
12	12	"Winner Takes All"	Amanda Marsalis	Gene Hong	January 20, 2019	MPI113	8.76
13	13	"Day of the Viper"	Bryan Spicer	Story by : David Fury; Teleplay by : Gene Hong & Eric Guggenheim	January 21, 2019	MPI111	5.33
14	14	"I, The Deceased"	Krishna Rao	Scarlett Lacey	January 28, 2019	MPI114	5.69
15	15	"Day the Past Came Back"	Bryan Spicer	Peter M. Lenkov & Eric Guggenheim	February 18, 2019	MPI115	5.97
16	16	"Murder is Never Quiet"	David Straiton	Barbie Kligman	February 25, 2019	MPI116	6.29
17	17	"Black is the Widow"	Kirstin Windell	Neil Tolkin	March 4, 2019	MPI117	5.61
18	18	"A Kiss Before Dying"	Bryan Spicer	Barbie Kligman & Ashley Charbonnet	March 11, 2019	MPI118	6.05
19	19	"Blood in the Water"	Karen Gaviola	Gene Hong	March 25, 2019	MPI119	5.74
20	20	"The Day It All Came Together"	Bryan Spicer	Peter M. Lenkov & Eric Guggenheim	April 1, 2019	MPI120	5.54

=== Season 2 (2019–20) ===
==== Part 1 ====
List of Magnum P.I. season 2 episodes
No. overall	No. in season	Title	Directed by	Written by	Original release date	Prod. code	US viewers (millions)
21	1	"Payback for Beginners" "Payback is for Beginners"	Bryan Spicer	Peter M. Lenkov & Eric Guggenheim	September 27, 2019	MPI201	6.40
22	2	"Honor Among Thieves"	Carlos Bernard	Gene Hong	October 4, 2019	MPI203	6.09
23	3	"Knight Lasts Forever"	Eagle Egilsson	Neil Tolkin	October 11, 2019	MPI202	6.43
24	4	"Dead Inside"	Krishna Rao	Barbie Kligman	October 18, 2019	MPI204	5.79
25	5	"Make It 'Til Dawn"	Bryan Spicer	Gene Hong & Tera Tolentino	October 25, 2019	MPI206	5.97
26	6	"Lie, Cheat, Steal, Kill"	Ron Underwood	Alfredo Barrios Jr.	November 1, 2019	MPI205	6.42
27	7	"The Man in the Secret Room"	Allison Liddi-Brown	Joe Gazzam	November 8, 2019	MPI208	6.69
28	8	"He Came by Night"	Antonio Negret	Barbie Kligman	November 15, 2019	MPI207	6.55
29	9	"A Bullet Named Fate"	Doug Hannah	Story by : Scarlett Lacey & Neil Tolkin; Teleplay by : Neil Tolkin	November 22, 2019	MPI209	6.72
30	10	"Blood Brothers"	Peter Weller	Peter M. Lenkov & Eric Guggenheim	December 6, 2019	MPI210	6.33
31	11	"Day I Met the Devil"	Kristin Windell	Alfredo Barrios Jr.	December 13, 2019	MPI211	6.12
32	12	"Desperate Measures"	Maja Vrvillo	Peter M. Lenkov & Eric Guggenheim	January 3, 2020	MPI212	7.83
33	13	"Mondays Are For Murder"	Alexandra LaRoche	Story by : Peter M. Lenkov & Eric Guggenheim; Teleplay by : Alfredo Barrios Jr.	January 10, 2020	MPI213	7.04
34	14	"A Game of Cat and Mouse"	Roderick Davis	Gene Hong	January 31, 2020	MPI216	7.05

==== Part 2 ====
List of Magnum P.I. season 2 episodes
No. overall	No. in season	Title	Directed by	Written by	Original release date	Prod. code	US viewers (millions)
35	15	"Say Hello to Your Past"	Avi Youabian	Joe Gazzam	April 10, 2020	MPI215	7.40
36	16	"Farewell to Love"	Bronwen Hughes	Ashley Charbonnet & Alfredo Barrios Jr.	April 17, 2020	MPI214	7.14
37	17	"The Night Has Eyes"	David Straiton	Ashley Charbonnet	April 24, 2020	MPI217	7.20
38	18	"A World of Trouble"	Peter Weller	Tera Tolentino & Neil Tolkin	May 1, 2020	MPI219	7.21
39	19	"May The Best One Win"	Rocky Carroll	Gene Hong	May 8, 2020	MPI218	6.87
40	20	"A Leopard on the Prowl"	Bryan Spicer	Eric Guggenheim & Peter M. Lenkov	May 8, 2020	MPI220	6.09

=== Season 3 (2020–21) ===
List of Magnum P.I. season 3 episodes
No. overall	No. in season	Title	Directed by	Written by	Original release date	Prod. code	US viewers (millions)
41	1	"Double Jeopardy"	Bryan Spicer	Peter M. Lenkov & Eric Guggenheim	December 4, 2020	MPI301	5.50
42	2	"Easy Money"	Bryan Spicer	David Wolkove	December 11, 2020	MPI302	5.69
43	3	"No Way Out"	Eagle Egilsson	Barbie Kligman	December 18, 2020	MPI303	5.48
44	4	"First the Beatdown, Then the Blowback"	Eagle Egilsson	Teleplay by : Eric Guggenheim & Mike Diaz; Story by : Aaron Lam & Peter M. Lenkov	January 8, 2021	MPI304	5.87
45	5	"The Day Danger Walked In"	Krishna Rao	Peter M. Lenkov & Eric Guggenheim	January 15, 2021	MPI305	5.52
46	6	"Tell No One"	Eagle Egilsson	Gene Hong	January 22, 2021	MPI306	5.86
47	7	"Killer on the Midnight Watch"	Geoff Shotz	Gene Hong	February 5, 2021	MPI307	5.70
48	8	"Someone to Watch Over Me"	Geoff Shotz	Barbie Kligman	February 12, 2021	MPI308	5.76
49	9	"The Big Payback"	Yangzom Brauen	David Wolkove	February 19, 2021	MPI309	5.97
50	10	"The Long Way Home"	Yangzom Brauen	Teleplay by : Katie Varney; Story by : Katie Varney and Peter M. Lenkov & Eric Guggenheim	March 5, 2021	MPI310	5.63
51	11	"The Lies We Tell"	Rubba Nada	Katie Varney	March 26, 2021	MPI311	5.62
52	12	"Dark Harvest"	Rubba Nada	Gene Hong	April 2, 2021	MPI312	5.37
53	13	"Cry Murder"	Peter Weller	Story by : Emily Singer; Teleplay by : Peter M. Lenkov & Eric Guggenheim	April 9, 2021	MPI313	5.61
54	14	"Whispers of Death"	Peter Weller	Tera Tolentino	April 16, 2021	MPI314	5.58
55	15	"Before the Fall"	Kurt Jones	Mike Diaz	April 30, 2021	MPI315	5.35
56	16	"Bloodline"	Avi Youabian	Eric Guggenheim & Geoffrey Thorne	May 7, 2021	MPI316	5.00

=== Season 4 (2021–22) ===
List of Magnum P.I. season 4 episodes
No. overall	No. in season	Title	Directed by	Written by	Original release date	Prod. code	US viewers (millions)
57	1	"Island Vibes"	Bryan Spicer	Eric Guggenheim & Gene Hong	October 1, 2021	MPI401	5.23
58	2	"The Harder They Fall"	Doug Hannah	David Wolkove	October 8, 2021	MPI402	5.20
59	3	"Texas Wedge"	Antonio Negret	Gene Hong	October 15, 2021	MPI403	5.37
60	4	"Those We Leave Behind"	Allison Liddi-Brown	Barbie Kligman	October 22, 2021	MPI404	5.07
61	5	"Til Death"	Eagle Egilsson	Katie Varney	November 5, 2021	MPI405	5.59
62	6	"Devil on the Doorstep"	Claudia Yarmy	Tera Tolentino	November 12, 2021	MPI406	5.45
63	7	"A New Lease on Death"	Rubba Nadda	Teleplay by : Barbie Kligman; Story by : Barbie Kilgman & Zachary Knighton	November 19, 2021	MPI407	5.17
64	8	"A Fire in the Ashes"	Lisa Robinson	David Slack	December 3, 2021	MPI408	5.34
65	9	"Better Watch Out"	Ruba Nadda	Katie Varney	December 10, 2021	MPI409	5.39
66	10	"Dream Lover"	Avi Youabian	David Wolkove	January 7, 2022	MPI410	5.32
67	11	"If I Should Die Before I Wake"	Lin Oeding	Gene Hong & Andre Jackson	January 14, 2022	MPI411	5.77
68	12	"Angels Sometimes Kill"	Marcus Stokes	Story by : Mike Diaz; Teleplay by : Mike Diaz & Barbie Kligman	January 21, 2022	MPI412	5.43
69	13	"Judge Me Not"	Benny Boom	David Slack	January 28, 2022	MPI413	5.22
70	14	"Run, Baby, Run"	Roderick Davis	David Wolkove	February 25, 2022	MPI414	5.21
71	15	"Dead Man Walking"	David Straiton	Gene Hong	March 4, 2022	MPI415	4.88
72	16	"Evil Walks Softly"	Alexandra La Roche	Tera Tolentino	March 11, 2022	MPI416	5.01
73	17	"Remember Me Tomorrow" "Sleep with the Fishes"	Bryan Spicer	Mike Diaz & Barbie Kligman & Katie Varney	April 1, 2022	MPI417	4.87
74	18	"Shallow Grave, Deep Water"	Jay Hernandez	David Slack	April 8, 2022	MPI418	5.31
75	19	"The Long Sleep"	Eagle Egilsson	Mike Diaz & Andre Jackson & David Wolkove	April 29, 2022	MPI419	4.81
76	20	"Close to Home"	Bryan Spicer	Eric Guggenheim	May 6, 2022	MPI420	5.06

=== Season 5 (2023–24) ===
==== Part 1 ====
List of Magnum P.I. season 5 episodes
No. overall	No. in season	Title	Directed by	Written by	Original release date	Prod. code	U.S. viewers (millions)
77	1	"The Passenger"	Bryan Spicer	Eric Guggenheim	February 19, 2023	MPI501	3.87
78	2	"The Breaking Point"	Bryan Spicer	Gene Hong	February 19, 2023	MPI502	3.30
79	3	"Number one with a Bullet"	Eagle Egilsson	David Wolkove	February 26, 2023	MPI503	3.70
80	4	"NSFW"	Eagle Egilsson	David Slack	March 5, 2023	MPI504	3.56
81	5	"Welcome to Paradise, Now Die!"	Marcus Stokes	Tera Tolentino	March 12, 2023	MPI505	3.29
82	6	"Dead Ringer"	Marcus Stokes	Barbie Kligman	March 19, 2023	MPI506	3.07
83	7	"Birthright"	Doug Hannah	Andre Jackson & Eric Guggenheim	March 26, 2023	MPI507	2.73
84	8	"Dark Skies"	Doug Hannah	Andrew Blazensky & Tera Tolentino	April 2, 2023	MPI508	3.59
85	9	"Out of Sight, Out of Mind"	Jay Hernandez	David Slack	April 16, 2023	MPI509	3.29
86	10	"Charlie Foxtrot"	Lisa Robinson	David Wolkove	April 23, 2023	MPI510	3.12

==== Part 2 ====
List of Magnum P.I. season 5 episodes
No. overall	No. in season	Title	Directed by	Written by	Original release date	Prod. code	U.S. viewers (millions)
87	11	"Hit and Run"	David Straiton	Gene Hong	October 4, 2023	MPI511	3.57
88	12	"Three Bridges"	David Straiton	Barbie Kligman	October 11, 2023	MPI512	3.35
89	13	"Appetite for Danger"	Ruba Nadda	Eric Guggenheim & David Slack	October 18, 2023	MPI513	3.27
90	14	"Night Has a Thousand Eyes"	Ruba Nadda	Tera Tolentino	October 25, 2023	MPI514	3.19
91	15	"The Retrieval"	Benny Boom	Gene Hong & Katie Varney	November 1, 2023	MPI515	3.07
92	16	"Run with the Devil" "Suffer Little Children"	Benny Boom	David Wolkove	November 15, 2023	MPI516	3.32
93	17	"Consciousness of Guilt"	Zachary Knighton	Andre Jackson & David Slack	December 6, 2023	MPI517	3.01
94	18	"Extracurricular Activities"	Perdita Weeks	Katie Varney	December 13, 2023	MPI518	2.93
95	19	"Ashes to Ashes"	Eagle Egilsson	Tera Tolentino & Andrew Blazensky & Barbie Kligman	January 3, 2024	MPI519	3.88
96	20	"The Big Squeeze"	Avi Youabian	Eric Guggenheim & David Wolkove	January 3, 2024	MPI520	3.48

== Ratings ==
Magnum P.I. : U.S. viewers per episode (millions)

Season	Episode number																				Average
Season	1	2	3	4	5	6	7	8	9	10	11	12	13	14	15	16	17	18	19	20	Average
1	8.12	6.23	6.07	5.47	5.63	5.69	5.26	5.50	5.38	5.47	6.01	8.75	5.32	5.68	5.96	6.29	5.60	6.04	5.74	5.53	5.99
2	6.40	6.08	6.42	5.79	5.96	6.41	6.69	6.55	6.72	6.32	6.12	7.83	7.04	7.05	7.40	7.13	7.19	7.24	6.87	6.08	6.67
3	5.50	5.69	5.48	5.87	5.52	5.86	5.70	5.76	5.97	5.63	5.62	5.37	5.61	5.58	5.35	5.00	–				5.59
4	5.23	5.20	5.37	5.07	5.59	5.45	5.17	5.34	5.55	5.32	5.77	5.43	5.22	5.21	4.88	5.01	4.87	5.31	4.81	5.06	5.24
5	3.87	3.30	3.70	3.56	3.29	3.07	2.73	3.59	3.29	3.12	3.57	3.35	3.27	3.19	3.07	3.32	3.01	2.93	3.88	3.48	3.33

Audience measurement performed by Nielsen Media Research
