= Lenkov-verse =

American media franchise

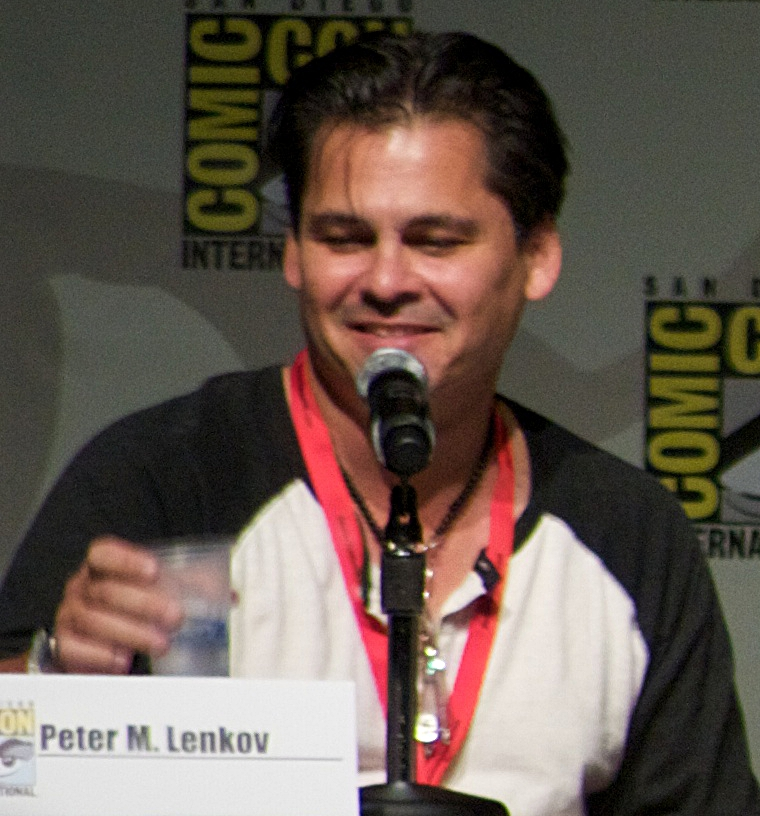
- Peter M. Lenkov
- Created by: Peter M. Lenkov
- Original work: Hawaii Five-0
- Owners: CBS (Paramount) (Note: MacGyver is the only series whose original version did not air on CBS; instead, it ran for seven seasons on ABC (1985–1992). Additionally, Magnum P.I. was revived by NBC after it ran for four seasons on CBS (2018–2022).); NBC (NBCUniversal) (Note: Magnum P.I. was revived by NBC after it ran for four seasons on CBS (2018–2022).)
- Years: 2010–2024

Print publications
- Book: The Official MacGyver Survival Manual: 155 Ways to Save the Day

Films and television
- Television series: Hawaii Five-0; MacGyver; Magnum P.I.

Audio
- Soundtracks: Hawaii Five-0: Original Songs from the Television Series; Hawaii Five-0 Original Series Soundtrack

Miscellaneous
- Related TV series: NCIS: Los Angeles

The Lenkov-verse (sometimes written as the Lenkoverse) is a media franchise that consists of a group of three interconnected television reboots that share a fictional universe, and their related media. All three of the television series, Hawaii Five-0, MacGyver, and Magnum P.I., were developed by Peter M. Lenkov who also served as the showrunner on the series. They are each American crime dramas that aired on CBS. (Note: MacGyver is the only series whose original version did not air on CBS; instead, it ran for seven seasons on ABC (1985–1992). Additionally, Magnum P.I. was revived by NBC after it ran for four seasons on CBS (2018–2022).) Hawaii Five-0 revolves around a task force, led by Steve McGarrett, that investigates crimes in Hawaii. MacGyver centers around Angus MacGyver who uses nonviolent methods to keep the world safe, with the help of a team of undercover government agents. Magnum P.I. follows private investigator Thomas Magnum, who solves crimes in Hawaii with the help of his friends. The universe is also connected to the so-called Bellisario-verse, which consists of the entire NCIS franchise and JAG, via two direct crossovers between Hawaii Five-0 and NCIS: Los Angeles.

Three television series make up the Lenkov-verse franchise: Hawaii Five-0, MacGyver, and Magnum P.I.. All series in total amount to 430 episodes across 20 seasons of television. On May 6, 2020, the remaining series in the franchise, MacGyver and Magnum P.I., were renewed for their fifth and third seasons, respectively, for the 2020–21 broadcast season. On July 7, 2020, it was reported that Lenkov was fired from his role as executive producer and showrunner on MacGyver and Magnum P.I, following an investigation into allegations that he created a toxic work environment. Monica Macer and Eric Guggenheim replaced Lenkov as showrunner, on MacGyver and Magnum P.I, respectively. On November 9, 2020, it was announced that the fifth season of MacGyver and the third season of Magnum P.I, would premiere on December 4, 2020. In April 2021, CBS announced that MacGyver would end after its fifth season. Later that month, Magnum P.I. was renewed for a fourth season, which premiered on October 1, 2021. In May 2022, Magnum P.I. was cancelled after four seasons, however, on June 30, 2022, the series was picked up by NBC with a two-season, twenty-episode order, which was later clarified to be split as a two-part fifth season rather than two separate seasons. The fifth season premiered on February 19, 2023 and the 2-hour series finale aired on January 3, 2024.

== Development ==
=== Television ===
There are possibilities...the Hawaii Five-0 opportunity popped up and we said, "That's great; let's do it." Those things happen without a lot of planning. It's not anything you plan and set before. It's something that pops up in the writing... It has to be organic or else it feels bolted on. It has to be a natural extension of the story that's going on. For Hawaii Five-0, that's exactly what it is.

— Shane Brennan, producer on NCIS: Los Angeles, on future crossovers with Hawaii Five-0.

Up until the reboot of MacGyver in 2016, CBS's Hawaii Five-0 was the only show in the Lenkov-verse. Debuting in September 2010, the show had enjoyed solid ratings and had helped to boost Hawaii's economy with increased tourist visits to local businesses and cultural sites featured on the show. Despite solid viewership during its first season and the ability to hold its own against powerhouses like ESPN's NFL Monday Night Football and ABC's Castle, Five-0 wasn't pulling the same ratings as CBS's flagship police procedural, NCIS. As such, Peter Lenkov outlined that the second season would have a lot more to it, promising new cast members and an expanded setting, stating, "...we wanted to explore the other islands, and I think we just never got the chance. We're going to do that this year. We have these little ambitions, and that's one of them. Because it's Hawaii Five-0 and not Oahu Five-0, they can go to the other islands. And ultimately we want to explore off the islands. It's a task force, and the idea is there are no real boundaries for them." But an even bigger surprise came two months later on August 18, 2011, just prior to the 2nd season premiere, when NCIS: Los Angeles star Daniela Ruah tweeted, "Aloha hoaloha! Read my lips closely... Kensi will make her way to Hawaii Five-0 this season! Stay tuned... #H50 #NCISLA", hinting that Five-0 would not only expand to other islands, but to other shows. It also left NCIS fans to speculate that Ruah was leaving her show for greener pastures. Shortly after the news was confirmed, however, Ruah tweeted that it was a one-time crossover and that she would be coming back to her regular show while NCIS producer Shane Brennan mused "Interestingly, Daniela has never been to Hawaii, so it took no convincing," Brennan also stated that the visit to the show wasn't gratuitous and would have a purpose, jokingly adding, "I'm a bit concerned they might not give her back!"

Five-0 viewers would not have to wait long for a second crossover with NCIS. At the beginning of 2012, CBS approached Brennan with the idea of a two-part crossover event for May Sweeps involving both Hawaii Five-0 and NCIS: Los Angeles to which Brennan agreed. While Brennan was thrilled about the "high-octane story" that would bring out the best in both shows, Five-0 producer Peter Lenkov was excited about exploring the relationship between the two main characters of both shows: Five-0 Task Force leader Steven McGarrett and NCIS's Sam Hanna, who became friends during their military service. "Chris and LL are going to come to Hawaii" Lenkov said. "There's a bit of a history there." The two-part episode, titled "Pa Make Loa (Touch of Death)", drew big ratings for both shows. Five-0 saw over 14 million viewers(Live/Delayed DVR figures combined) while NCIS: Los Angeles saw over 18 million viewers(Live/Delayed DVR figures combined). NCIS producer Shane Brennan remarked that the reaction with fans and critics seemed largely positive and added "Crossovers are not easy to pull off when you're working in the same town, and when you've got the other show being shot a five-hour flight away, it's particularly challenging." Nonetheless, Brennan again expressed optimism for a future crossover with Five-0, stating, "I think the audiences are willing to accept crossovers when both shows operate in the same world and that was certainly the case with NCIS and Hawaii Five-0. Having them overlap in terms of crimes was very easy for us to do. Whether or not we'll do more is up to CBS. It's something I'd be very happy to do again." Lenkov was equally acquiescent, stating, "It just seemed like a natural to continue the relationship."

Despite the seemingly good rapport between the production crews of Five-0 and NCIS, the two shows would not see another crossover again nor was there a single crossover between Five-0 and another show until 2016, when viewers saw the debut of Lenkov's second "universe" offering, the CBS reboot of the 1985 ABC series, MacGyver. Immediately, Peter Lenkov hinted that MacGyver was not only in the same universe as Hawaii Five-0 but that he was forced to cut a scene in the pilot episode of MacGyver where Jack Dalton's sniper rifle had "ALOHA" painted on the barrel of the gun as a nod to Five-0's Steve McGarrett. "...the idea was that he knew McGarrett...in the military. I still would like to take advantage of that," Lenkov told the press, adding, "Somehow we'll do a cross-over and those two guys knew each other. I'm hoping." While Lenkov's wish for a McGarrett/Dalton crossover never came to fruition (Hawaii Five-0 ended in 2020 and George Eads who plays Dalton left MacGyver in the middle of season three), the first season of MacGyver officially and firmly placed the series in the same fictional universe as Five-0 with the episode, "Magnifying Glass". In the episode, MacGyver and the Phoenix Foundation travel to Northern California to track down a copycat serial murderer who has been mimicking San Francisco's infamous Zodiac Killer. When they find out that the killer has been mentored and trained remotely from Oahu by Dr. Madison Gray (a serial killer who fled Hawaii for California in a preceding Five-0 episode), Jack Dalton notifies Steve McGarrett of the 5-0 Task Force that Gray has returned to Hawaii. This plot thread continued into Five-0, with the episode, "Hahai i na pilikua nui (Hunting Monsters)" in which Chin Ho Kelly follows up on Dalton's tip-off, telling McGarrett "that call from your friends at the Phoenix Foundation wasn't wrong". After this set-up, Five-0 actors Daniel Dae Kim, Grace Park, and Taylor Wily crossed over into the MacGyver episode "Flashlight". In the episode, The Phoenix Foundation is sent to Oahu to help the Hawaii Police Department and Five-0 with rescue and recovery efforts and ends up working closely with Chin Ho Kelly and Kono. The episode closes out with Kamekona traveling to California to cater MacGyver's birthday party with a shrimp buffet. The Phoenix Foundation was subsequently mentioned in the Five-0 episode that aired immediately following "Flashlight" when Steve McGarrett tells Kono that The Phoenix Foundation appreciated the help from herself and Chin Ho Kelly. After Henry Ian Cusick joined MacGyver as the new owner of The Phoenix Foundation, Cusick tweeted a selfie of himself and actor Jorge Garcia (of Five-0), proclaiming, "Look who came out to playyayy!!!" Immediately, fans speculated on whether this meant that Garcia was coming to MacGyver and reprising his role as Jerry Ortega or as a completely new character. CBS would later confirm that Garcia was going to reprise his role as Jerry in the 5th season with a Tweet which read, "Anyone call for a conspiracy theorist? @jorgegarcia (Jerry Ortega from @HawaiiFive0CBS) will guest star on an upcoming episode of #MacGyver!", confirming the next crossover event between MacGyver and the cancelled Hawaii Five-0.

Numerous Five-0 characters guest starred in the first season of Magnum, most notably Kimee Balmilero and Taylor Wily who had recurring roles before a full crossover aired between the two shows in their tenth and second seasons, respectively. In a third season episode of Five-0, McGarrett, Williams, Bergman, and Kamekona, have a discussion about the television show Magnum, P.I. and its theme song, causing a continuity issue when the two series later crossover. Lenkov said "That was at a time when I had lost hope that I could get [my Magnum reboot] launched. I had been trying to do it for so long, I thought there was just no way it was going to happen, so I did a little tribute in that episode. But we'll take that one out of rotation."

Other actors, such as Henry Ian Cusick, Corbin Bernsen, Lance Gross, Elisabeth Röhm, Patrick Monahan, Andre Reed, and Janel Parrish have played various characters in the different series, also causing continuity issues that were not addressed. In March 2021, Katrina Law was cast in the recurring role of Jessica Knight in NCIS, the parent series of NCIS: Los Angeles, furthering the continuity concern.

== Franchise overview ==
=== Television series ===
Series	Television seasons													
Series	2010–11	2011–12	2012–13	2013–14	2014–15	2015–16	2016–17	2017–18	2018–19	2019–20	2020–21	2021–22	2022–23	2023–24
Hawaii Five-0	1	2	3	4	5	6	7	8	9	10				
MacGyver							1	2	3	4	5			
Magnum P.I.									1	2	3	4	5	

==== Hawaii Five-0 (2010–2020) ====
Hawaii Five-0 is the first series in the universe and is a reboot of the 1968 TV series of the same name. The rebooted series uses the numerical zero in place of the letter O (Five-0 instead of Five-O). It premiered on September 20, 2010, and aired 240 episodes over a ten-season run before concluding on April 3, 2020. The series focuses on a fictional state police task force, known as "Five-0" led by Steve McGarrett, that is set up by the Hawaiian governor to fight major crimes in Hawaii including murder, kidnapping, and terrorism. The series is filmed on location in Hawaii.

==== MacGyver (2016–2021) ====
MacGyver is the second series in the universe and is a reboot of the 1985 TV series of the same name. It premiered on September 23, 2016, and aired 94 episodes over a five-season run before concluding on April 30, 2021. The series focuses on the fictional "Phoenix Foundation" which is a covert organization masquerading as a think tank. The titular character, Angus MacGyver uses a talent for problem solving along with an extensive knowledge in science to solve problems. The series is set in Los Angeles, California, but is filmed in Atlanta, Georgia.

==== Magnum P.I. (2018–2024) ====
Magnum P.I. is the third and final series in the universe and is a reboot of the 1980 TV series of the same name. It premiered on September 24, 2018, and ended on January 3, 2024. The series focuses on a Navy SEAL turned private investigator named Thomas Magnum who investigates various crimes around Hawaii. Like Hawaii Five-0, the series is filmed in Hawaii.

==== Related ====
The universe is also connected to the NCIS franchise series, NCIS: Los Angeles, which had two direct fictional crossovers with Hawaii Five-0. Potential crossover opportunities between Magnum P.I. and NCIS: Hawaiʻi were considered possible as both series film in Hawaii.

=== Other media ===
Two of the television series have also spawned other media that are related to the series' themselves. On October 4, 2011, a television soundtrack entitled Hawaii Five-0: Original Songs from the Television Series was released featuring music that was used in Hawaii Five-0. In addition, a survival manual was released on September 17, 2019, entitled The Official MacGyver Survival Manual: 155 Ways to Save the Day that gives instructions on how to "MacGyver" things as seen in MacGyver. An additional television score from Hawaii Five-0, featuring music written for the series by Brian Tyler and Keith Power was released in July 2023.

== Season overview ==
Series	Season	Episodes		Originally released			Showrunner	Rank	Rating	Average viewers (million)	Status
Series	Season	Episodes		First released	Last released	Network	Showrunner	Rank	Rating	Average viewers (million)	Status
Hawaii Five-0	1	24		September 20, 2010	May 16, 2011	CBS	Peter M. Lenkov	22	7.5	11.26	Released/Ended
Hawaii Five-0	2	23		September 19, 2011	May 14, 2012	CBS	Peter M. Lenkov	26	7.6	11.83	Released/Ended
Hawaii Five-0	3	24		September 24, 2012	May 20, 2013	CBS	Peter M. Lenkov	35	6.8	10.36	Released/Ended
Hawaii Five-0	4	22		September 27, 2013	May 9, 2014	CBS	Peter M. Lenkov	21	7.5	11.66	Released/Ended
Hawaii Five-0	5	25		September 26, 2014	May 8, 2015	CBS	Peter M. Lenkov	20	7.8	12.28	Released/Ended
Hawaii Five-0	6	25		September 25, 2015	May 13, 2016	CBS	Peter M. Lenkov	25	7.0	11.04	Released/Ended
Hawaii Five-0	7	25		September 23, 2016	May 12, 2017	CBS	Peter M. Lenkov and Eric Guggenheim	15	7.6	12.15	Released/Ended
Hawaii Five-0	8	25		September 29, 2017	May 18, 2018	CBS	Peter M. Lenkov and Eric Guggenheim	18	6.8	11.00	Released/Ended
Hawaii Five-0	9	25		September 28, 2018	May 17, 2019	CBS	Peter M. Lenkov	26	6.2	10.01	Released/Ended
Hawaii Five-0	10	22		September 27, 2019	April 3, 2020	CBS	Peter M. Lenkov, David Wolkove, and Matt Wheeler	21	TBA	9.68	Released/Ended
MacGyver	1	21		September 23, 2016	April 14, 2017	CBS	Peter M. Lenkov and Craig O'Neill	27	6.1	9.80	Released/Ended
MacGyver	2	23		September 29, 2017	May 4, 2018	CBS	Peter M. Lenkov and Craig O'Neill	38	—N/a	8.59	Released/Ended
MacGyver	3	22		September 28, 2018	May 10, 2019	CBS	Peter M. Lenkov and Craig O'Neill	51	—N/a	7.63	Released/Ended
MacGyver	4	13		February 7, 2020	May 8, 2020	CBS	Peter M. Lenkov and Terry Matalas	44	TBA	7.50	Released/Ended
MacGyver	5	15		December 4, 2020	April 30, 2021	CBS	Monica Macer	TBA	TBA	TBA	Released/Ended
Magnum P.I.	1	20		September 24, 2018	April 1, 2019	CBS	Peter M. Lenkov and Eric Guggenheim	37	—N/a	8.26	Released/Ended
Magnum P.I.	2	20	14	September 27, 2019	January 31, 2020	CBS	Peter M. Lenkov and Eric Guggenheim	26	—N/a	8.91	Released/Ended
Magnum P.I.	2	20	6	April 10, 2020	May 8, 2020	CBS	Peter M. Lenkov and Eric Guggenheim	26	—N/a	8.91	Released/Ended
Magnum P.I.	3	16		December 4, 2020	May 7, 2021	CBS	Peter M. Lenkov, Eric Guggenheim, and Gene Hong	TBA	TBA	TBA	Released/Ended
Magnum P.I.	4	20		October 1, 2021	May 6, 2022	CBS	Eric Guggenheim and Gene Hong	TBA	TBA	TBA	Released/Ended
Magnum P.I.	5	20		February 19, 2023	January 3, 2024	NBC	Eric Guggenheim and Gene Hong	TBA	TBA	TBA	Released/Ended

== Cast and characters ==
Lenkov has been noted on his use of gender flipping of characters in his reboots. The character of Kono Kalakaua was portrayed by Zulu as a male character in the original Five-O but by Grace Park as a female character in the rebooted Five-0. Jean Smart was cast to play Governor Pat Jameson in the reboot as opposed to Paul Jameson in the original, and Larisa Oleynik was cast to play Jenna Kaye in the reboot as opposed to Jonathan Kaye in the original. In MacGyver, the character of Peter Thornton was renamed to Patricia Thornton, while in Magnum the character of Jonathan Higgins was renamed to Juliet Higgins to allow for gender flipping. Names of original Five-O cast members and characters although changed but non-gender swapped serve as the namesake for rebooted Five-0 characters, actors Richard Denning and Danny Kamekona from the original Five-O serve as the namesake for Governor Richard Denning and confidential informant Kamekona Tupuola in the reboot; while characters Doc Bergman and Che Fong serve as the namesake for Max Bergman and Charlie Fong, respectively, in the reboot.. Numerous Five-0 recurring characters who never received main billing have also appeared in Magnum as the same character including Larry Manetti as Nicky "The Kid" DeMarco, Shawn Mokuahi Garnett as Flippa, William Forsythe as P.I. Harry Brown, and Willie Garson as Gerard Hirsch. In addition a few actors who portrayed characters on original versions of the series have returned to portray the same or different characters in their respective reboots. Although not officially portrayed by the original actor who played the original Steve McGarrett, Jack Lord appeared in a seventh season episode of the reboot as an unnamed character; the episode replicated the appearance of Lord by using CGI effects along with a body and voice double. Dennis Chun, the son of Kam Fong Chun who played the original Chin Ho Kelly, who stars as Duke Lukela in Five-0 and Magnum, previously portrayed minor characters on both the original Five-O and Magnum. Al Harrington portrayed series regular Ben on the original Five-O as well as other minor characters on the original Five-O and Magnum series, in the 2010 reboot of Five-O he stars as recurring character Mamo Kahike. Ed Asner portrayed August March in the 1968 Five-O and also reprised his role in the second and third seasons of the rebooted series. Manetti previously starred as the original Rick in the original Magnum before portraying DeMarco in the rebooted Five-0 and Magnum. The universe has also been cited for causing Lost reunions between cast members. Daniel Dae Kim, Jorge Garcia, Henry Ian Cusick, and Five-0's recurring star Terry O'Quinn and guest stars Rebecca Mader, Tania Raymonde and others all appeared on Lost as well as Five-0 with Kim, Garcia, and Cusick, also appearing on MacGyver.

=== Main characters ===
Series	Character	Appearances				Actor	Duration
Series	Character	Franchise			Universe	Actor	Duration
Series	Character	Hawaii Five-0	MacGyver	Magnum P.I.	NCIS: LA	Actor	Duration
Hawaii Five-0	Steve McGarrett	Main				Alex O'Loughlin	2010–2020
Hawaii Five-0	Danny "Danno" Williams	Main			Guest	Scott Caan	2010–2020
Hawaii Five-0	Chin Ho Kelly	Main	Guest		Guest	Daniel Dae Kim	2010–2017
Hawaii Five-0	Kono Kalakaua	Main	Guest			Grace Park	2010–2017
Hawaii Five-0	Mary Ann McGarrett	Also starring				Taryn Manning	2010–2013, 2016, 2019
Hawaii Five-0	Max Bergman	Main				Masi Oka	2010–2017, 2019
Hawaii Five-0	Lori Weston	Also starring				Lauren German	2011–2012
Hawaii Five-0	Catherine Rollins	Main				Michelle Borth	2010–2016, 2018–2020
Hawaii Five-0	Lou Grover	Main				Chi McBride	2013–2020
Hawaii Five-0	Jerry Ortega	Main	Guest			Jorge Garcia	2013–2019, 2021
Hawaii Five-0	Tani Rey	Main		Guest		Meaghan Rath	2017–2020
Hawaii Five-0	Kamekona Tupuola	Main	Guest	Recurring		Taylor Wily	2010–2020
Hawaii Five-0	Duke Lukela	Main		Recurring		Dennis Chun	2010–2022
Hawaii Five-0	Noelani Cunha	Main		Recurring		Kimee Balmilero	2016–2021 (Note: Prior to being cast as Noelani Chuna in 2016, Balmilero portrayed a minor character named Allison in a 2012 episode of Five-0.)
Hawaii Five-0	Junior Reigns	Main		Guest		Beulah Koale	2017–2020
Hawaii Five-0	Adam Noshimuri	Main		Guest		Ian Anthony Dale	2011–2020
Hawaii Five-0	Quinn Liu	Main		Guest		Katrina Law	2019–2020
MacGyver	Angus MacGyver		Main			Lucas Till	2016–2021
MacGyver	Jack Dalton		Main			George Eads	2016–2019
MacGyver	Patricia Thornton		Main			Sandrine Holt	2016–2017
MacGyver	Riley Davis		Main			Tristin Mays	2016–2021
MacGyver	Wilt Bozer		Main			Justin Hires	2016–2021
MacGyver	Matty Webber		Main			Meredith Eaton	2017–2021
MacGyver	Samantha Cage		Main			Isabel Lucas	2017–2018
MacGyver	Desi Nguyen		Main			Levy Tran	2019–2021 (Note: Following the conclusion of MacGyver in 2021, Tran portrayed a minor character named Tia in a 2022 episode of Magnum.)
MacGyver	Russell Taylor		Main			Henry Ian Cusick	2020–2021 (Note: Prior to being cast as Russell Taylor in 2020, Cusick portrayed a minor character named Ernesto in a 2013 episode of Five-0.)
Magnum P.I.	Thomas Magnum	Guest		Main		Jay Hernandez	2018–2024
Magnum P.I.	Juliet Higgins	Guest		Main		Perdita Weeks	2018–2024
Magnum P.I.	Orville Wright	Guest		Main		Zachary Knighton	2018–2024
Magnum P.I.	Theodore Calvin	Guest		Main		Stephen Hill	2018–2024
Magnum P.I.	Kumu Tuileta			Main		Amy Hill	2018–2024 (Note: Prior to being cast as Kumu Tuileta in 2018, Hill had a minor role as a tour guide in a 2014 episode of Five-0.)
Magnum P.I.	Gordon Katsumoto			Main		Tim Kang	2018–2024

== Crossovers ==
Although the Lenkov-verse principally comprises Hawaii Five-0, MacGyver and Magnum P.I., its fictional continuity also extends to NCIS: Los Angeles through several crossover episodes. These connections developed through individual guest appearances, shared supporting characters and multi-episode storylines.

The earliest crossover occurred on October 24, 2011, when Daniela Ruah appeared as NCIS special agent Kensi Blye in the Hawaii Five-0 episode "Ka Hakaka Maikaʻi". Her character assisted Steve McGarrett and Joe White by examining a video recording. The programmes subsequently participated in a two-night crossover event, broadcast on April 30 and May 1, 2012, comprising the Hawaii Five-0 episode "Pa Make Loa" and the NCIS: Los Angeles episode "Touch of Death". The storyline involved the investigation of a suspect possessing a deadly virus, with characters from both programmes collaborating in Hawaii and Los Angeles. Executive producers Peter M. Lenkov and Shane Brennan discussed the crossover as an opportunity to develop the existing relationship between their programmes.

Following the introduction of the MacGyver reboot in September 2016, Lenkov began developing connections between that series and Hawaii Five-0. He explained that he had conceived the two programmes as existing in the same fictional world while writing the MacGyver pilot. Early references included an intended connection between Jack Dalton and Steve McGarrett through their military backgrounds, together with references to the Phoenix Foundation in Hawaii Five-0. The first direct crossover occurred in the MacGyver episode "Flashlight", broadcast on March 10, 2017. The episode featured Daniel Dae Kim, Grace Park and Taylor Wily reprising their Hawaii Five-0 characters Chin Ho Kelly, Kono Kalakaua and Kamekona Tupuola. Its storyline brought the Phoenix Foundation team to Hawaii to assist with earthquake relief and the rescue of government scientists.

The crossover required coordination between the two productions, as MacGyver was filmed primarily in Atlanta while Hawaii Five-0 was filmed in Hawaii. Lenkov explained that limited filming time for MacGyver stars Lucas Till and George Eads required some Hawaii-set scenes to be filmed in Atlanta. He described the production as an opportunity to establish a process for future crossovers.

Following the premiere of Magnum P.I. in September 2018, characters from Hawaii Five-0 began appearing in the newer series, including Noelani Cunha, Kamekona Tupuola and Sergeant Duke Lukela. A full crossover involving the principal characters of both programmes was subsequently arranged for January 3, 2020. The two-part event comprised the Hawaii Five-0 episode "Ihea 'oe i ka wa a ka ua e loku ana?" and the Magnum P.I. episode "Desperate Measures". The storyline began with the theft of a list identifying undercover CIA agents, bringing the Five-0 task force into contact with private investigators Thomas Magnum and Juliet Higgins. The second episode followed members of the Magnum P.I. team assisting Five-0 officers after Junior Reigns was kidnapped. Lenkov described the storyline as a production intended to resemble a two-hour film.

Crossovers continued after Hawaii Five-0 concluded in April 2020. On February 12, 2021, Jorge Garcia reprised his role as former Five-0 member Jerry Ortega in the fifth-season MacGyver episode "SOS + Hazmat + Ultrasound + Frequency + Malihini". The episode involved Ortega assisting Russ Taylor and Wilt Bozer with an investigation into the organisation Codex. Garcia's appearance also reunited him with Henry Ian Cusick, with whom he had previously appeared in the television series Lost.

Note: Due to the amount at which Five-0 actors crossover into Magnum, guest-appearances by Five-0 actors in Magnum are listed in a separate table.

Lenkov-verse crossovers
Crossover between		Episode(s)	Type	Actors crossing over	Date aired
Series A	Series B	Episode(s)	Type	Actors crossing over	Date aired
Hawaii Five-0	NCIS: Los Angeles	"Ka Hakaka Maikaʻi" (Hawaii Five-0 2.6)	Guest appearance	Appearing in Series A: Daniela Ruah	October 24, 2011
Main article: Ka Hakaka Maikaʻi Joe White calls in Agent Kensi Blye from NCIS: Los Angeles Office to review the video of John McGarrett, Governor Jameson, and Wo Fat for Steve, but only recognizes the word "Shelburne".
Hawaii Five-0	NCIS: Los Angeles	"Pa Make Loa" (Hawaii Five-0 2.21) "Touch of Death" (NCIS: Los Angeles 3.21)	Two-part crossover	Appearing in Series A: Chris O'Donnell, LL Cool J, Craig Robert Young; Appearing in Series B: Scott Caan, Daniel Dae Kim	April 30, 2012 – May 1, 2012
Main article: Touch of Death (crossover event) Agents Sam Hanna and G. Callen of NCIS: Los Angeles are called in to assist Five-0 finding a suspect, Dracul Comescu. Later, Callen and Sam must return to Los Angeles to stop a possible smallpox outbreak from becoming a reality with Danny "Danno" Williams and Chin Ho Kelly coming along to help.
MacGyver	Hawaii Five-0	"Flashlight" (MacGyver 1.18)	One-part crossover	Appearing in Series A: Daniel Dae Kim, Grace Park, Taylor Wily	March 10, 2017
Main article: Flashlight (MacGyver) The Phoenix Foundation team of MacGyver gets rerouted to Hawaii after a 7.2 magnitude earthquake hits the coast of Hawai'i Island. While aiding Detective Chin Ho Kelly and Officer Kono Kalakaua from Five-0 task force, they also have to deal with the Chinese intelligence soldiers who use the earthquake to steal top-secret weaponry that the scientists are currently developing.
Hawaii Five-0	Magnum P.I.	"Ihea 'oe i ka wa a ka ua e loku ana?" (Hawaii Five-0 10.12) "Desperate Measures" (Magnum P.I. 2.12)	Two-part crossover	Appearing in Series A: Jay Hernandez, Perdita Weeks, Zachary Knighton, Stephen Hill Appearing in Series B: Beulah Koale, Meaghan Rath, Katrina Law, Taylor Wily	January 3, 2020
Main article: Hawaii Five-0 and Magnum P.I. crossover While the Five-0 Task Force take up the case of a stolen list of undercover CIA agents, they cross paths with Thomas Magnum and Juliet Higgins who are investigating the same case. Soon after, Junior Reigns is kidnapped as leverage for the criminals to get the list back, leading to Magnum's team helping Tani Rey and Quinn Liu in a search-and-rescue mission.
Hawaii Five-0	Magnum P.I.	"Nalowale i ke 'ehu o he kai" (Hawaii Five-0 10.18)	Guest appearance	Appearing in Series A: Zachary Knighton	February 28, 2020
Main article: Nalowale i ke 'ehu o he kai Five-0 investigates a murder on a coast guard ship and suspect that pirates are impersonating as Coast Guards to board ships. Meanwhile, Adam hold the key evidence to take down Hawaii's Yakuza once and for all. Also, Noelani enlists the help from Quinn when she suspects that her uncle did not die of a heart attack and thinks it was a murder cover up.
MacGyver	Hawaii Five-0	"SOS + Hazmat + Ultrasound + Frequency + Malihini" (MacGyver 5.8)	Guest appearance	Appearing in Series A: Jorge Garcia	February 12, 2021
Phoenix receives help from former Five-0 member Jerry Ortega, who once helped Mac and is known for his conspiracy theories. Ortega has discovered some recruitment efforts by CODEX that he thinks may be valuable. Ortega also learns of a bomb request from CODEX, and Russ realizes Jerry is the best person to impersonate a bomb maker. During the meet, Russ and Bozer are able capture four CODEX members, while Ortega grabs a flash drive off one member. Russ learns from the flash drive that the CODEX recruiting efforts are more widespread than anyone thought.

Guest-appearances by Hawaii Five-0 actors in Magnum P.I. (Note: This table does not include actors who portrayed different characters in each series)
Actor	Character	No. of Appearances	Season	Episodes
Kimee Balmilero	Noelani Cunha	16	1	"I Saw the Sun Rise" • "Sudden Death" • "Death Is Only Temporary" • "I, The Deceased" • "Day the Past Came Back" • "A Kiss Before Dying" • "The Day It All Came Together"
Kimee Balmilero	Noelani Cunha	16	2	"Lie, Cheat, Steal, Kill" • "The Man in the Secret Room" • "A Bullet Named Fate" • "The Night Has Eyes" • "May The Best One Win"
Kimee Balmilero	Noelani Cunha	16	3	"Double Jeopardy" • "First the Beatdown, Then the Blowback" • "Tell No One" • "Cry Murder"
Taylor Wily	Kamekona Tupuola	7	1	"From the Head Down" • "Day of the Viper"
Taylor Wily	Kamekona Tupuola	7	2	"Lie, Cheat, Steal, Kill" • "Desperate Measures" • "Mondays Are For Murder" • "A Game of Cat and Mouse" • "A World of Trouble"
Dennis Chun	Sergeant Duke Lukela	4	1	"Black is the Widow"
Dennis Chun	Sergeant Duke Lukela	4	2	"The Night Has Eyes"
Dennis Chun	Sergeant Duke Lukela	4	3	"First the Beatdown, Then the Blowback"
Dennis Chun	Sergeant Duke Lukela	4	4	"Evil Walks Softly"
Shawn Makuahi Garnett	Flippa	4	2	"Lie, Cheat, Steal, Kill" • "A World of Trouble"
Shawn Makuahi Garnett	Flippa	4	3	"Double Jeopardy" • "Tell No One"
Larry Manetti	Nicky "The Kid" DeMarco	3	2	"Honor Among Thieves" • "The Man in the Secret Room"
Larry Manetti	Nicky "The Kid" DeMarco	3	5	"Appetite For Danger"
Kala Alexander	Kawika	2	1	"I Saw the Sun Rise" • "Day the Past Came Back"
William Forsythe	Harry Brown	2	2	"Lie, Cheat, Steal, Kill" • "A Bullet Named Fate"
Willie Garson	Gerard Hirsch	1	2	"Blood Brothers"
Meaghan Rath	Tani Rey	1	2	"Desperate Measures"
Katrina Law	Quinn Liu	1	2	"Desperate Measures"
Beulah Koale	Junior Reigns	1	2	"Desperate Measures"
Ian Anthony Dale	Adam Noshimuri	1	2	"A Leopard on the Prowl"

=== Reception of crossovers ===
Several crossover events produced increases in television viewership. The May 1, 2012 episode of NCIS: Los Angeles, which concluded the two-night crossover with Hawaii Five-0, attracted approximately 15 million viewers in its initial broadcast. According to TVLine, its adults aged 18–49 rating increased by 25 percent compared with the programme's previous original episode, while its total audience increased by 17 percent.

The January 2020 Hawaii Five-0 and Magnum P.I. crossover also recorded increased audiences. Preliminary same-day ratings showed that the Hawaii Five-0 instalment attracted approximately 8 million viewers, an increase of 21 percent compared with its previous episode, while Magnum P.I. attracted approximately 7.8 million viewers, an increase of 28 percent. The broadcasts achieved some of the strongest ratings of their respective seasons.

Reviewing the opening episode of the 2020 crossover for Cultured Vultures, Kacie Lillejord praised the interaction between the characters from both series, particularly the contrasting personalities of Steve McGarrett and Thomas Magnum. She highlighted the humour generated by the differences between the two investigative teams and the performances of Alex O'Loughlin and Jay Hernandez.

== Production ==
Lenkov, Guggenheim, and David Wolkove have all written for Hawaii Five-0 and Magnum P.I, with Lenkov also having written for MacGyver. Lenkov wrote fifty-eight episodes of Hawaii Five-0, seven of MacGyver, and fifteen of Magnum P.I. Guggenheim has written twenty-five episodes of Hawaii Five-0 and sixteen of Magnum P.I. Wolkove has written forty-eight episodes of Hawaii Five-0 and two episodes of Magnum P.I. The series have also used many of the same directors.

People who have directed episodes of multiple shows in the Lenkov-verse
Name	Number directed		
Name	Hawaii Five-0	MacGyver	Magnum P.I.
Brad Turner	10	3	0
Matt Earl Beesley	3	1	0
Duane Clark	8	4	1
Joe Dante	10	1	0
Bryan Spicer	35	0	9
Christine Moore	2	2	0
Jerry Levine	14	1	0
Sylvain White	8	1	1
Peter Weller	15	3	5
Allison Liddi-Brown	2	0	1
Maja Vrvilo	13	1	1
Brad Tanenbaum	4	1	0
Stephen Herek	3	11	0
Eagle Egilsson	11	5	5
Bobby Roth	2	2	0
Bronwen Hughes	3	0	1
Ron Underwood	4	2	2
Carlos Bernard	4	3	1
Roderick Davis	4	2	1
Krishna Rao	2	0	3
Antonio Negret	3	2	2
Liz Allen Rosenbaum	1	2	0
Gabriel Beristain	2	3	0
Karen Gaviola	6	0	2
Yangzom Brauen	1	2	2
Kristin Windell	1	0	2
Geoff Shotz	1	1	2
Andi Armaganian	1	1	0
David Straiton	0	8	2
Avi Youabian	0	2	2
