= Magnum P.I. (2018 TV series) season 3 =

Third season of the crime and action drama Magnum P.I. on CBS

Magnum P.I.
- Season 3
- United States DVD cover
- Showrunners: Peter M. Lenkov; Eric Guggenheim; Gene Hong
- Starring: Jay Hernandez; Perdita Weeks; Zachary Knighton; Stephen Hill; Amy Hill; Tim Kang
- No. of episodes: 16

Release
- Original network: CBS
- Original release: December 4, 2020 – May 7, 2021

Season chronology
- ← Previous; Season 2 Next → Season 4

The third season of the crime and action drama Magnum P.I. premiered on December 4, 2020, on CBS, for the 2020–21 United States network television schedule. The series is a remake of the 1980 series of the same name and centers on Thomas Magnum, a former Navy SEAL who works as a private investigator and solves mysteries with his business partner Juliet Higgins and other friends. It stars Jay Hernandez, Perdita Weeks, Zachary Knighton, Stephen Hill, Amy Hill, and Tim Kang. The season was ordered on May 8, 2020. It was later revealed that the season would only consist of 16 episodes as a result of the COVID-19 pandemic in the United States. Multiple Hawaii Five-0 stars appeared as their Hawaii Five-0 characters in minor crossover events throughout the season and a possible crossover between the series and MacGyver was discussed by the writers. Magnum P.I., Hawaii Five-0, and MacGyver are collectively referred to as the Lenkov-verse.

This is the first season not to feature co-developer Peter M. Lenkov as co-showrunner and executive producer after he was fired over allegations for a toxic work environment. Eric Guggenheim, who also co-developed the series and served as co-showrunner and executive producer alongside Lenkov, took over the main day-to-day operations of the series. In addition, Gene Hong, a writer and executive producer for the series, also became a co-showrunner. Production crew from Hawaii Five-0, including a writer, a line producer, and a cinematographer, moved to the series after Hawaii Five-0's cancellation. The season premiere, "Double Jeopardy," was watched by 5.50 million viewers.

== Cast and characters ==
=== Main ===
- Jay Hernandez as Thomas Magnum, a former Navy SEAL who is a security consultant for the successful novelist Robin Masters, living in the guest house on his estate, while also working as a private investigator
- Perdita Weeks as Juliet Higgins, a former MI6 agent who is majordomo to Robin Masters; she and Magnum bicker but become allies
- Zachary Knighton as Orville "Rick" Wright, a Marine veteran and former door gunner, who runs his own tiki bar and is also a playboy
- Stephen Hill as Theodore "T.C." Calvin, a Marine veteran and helicopter pilot who runs helicopter tours of Hawaii and is a member of Magnum's team
- Amy Hill as Teuila "Kumu" Tuileta, the cultural curator of Robin Masters' estate
- Tim Kang as Honolulu Police Department (HPD) Detective Gordon Katsumoto, who dislikes Magnum but usually comes to the team's aid when needed

=== Recurring ===
- Jay Ali as Dr. Ethan Shah
- Christopher Thornton as Kenny "Shammy" Shamberg
- Lance Lim as Dennis Katsumoto
- Betsy Phillips as Suzy Madison

=== Notable guests ===
- Paola Nunez as Helen
- Brian Letscher as Bruce
- Juan-Pablo Veizaga as Max Martinez
- Hayden Szeto as Det. Pono Palima
- Dominic Hoffman as USCIS Tenney
- Eric Ladin as Freddie
- Eddie Lee Anderson as HPD SWAT Commander Fong
- Leith Burke as CIA Officer Grayson
- Roger E. Mosley as John Booky
- Janel Parrish as Maleah
- Bobby Lee as Jin Jeong
- Corbin Bernsen as Francis "Icepick" Hofstetler
- Kelen Coleman as Gina Gow
- Steven Michael Quezada as Uncle Bernardo
- Grace Victoria Cox as Chloe Dawson
- Alex Carter as Henry Sellers

=== Crossover ===
- Kimee Balmilero as Dr. Noelani Cunha
- Shawn Mokuahi Garnett as Flippa
- Dennis Chun as HPD Sergeant Duke Lukela

== Episodes ==
The number in the "No. overall" column refers to the episode's number within the overall series, whereas the number in the "No. in season" column refers to the episode's number within this particular season. Numerous episodes are named after similarly named episodes from the original series. "Production code" refers to the order in which the episodes were produced while "U.S. viewers (millions)" refers to the number of viewers in the U.S. in millions who watched the episode as it was aired.

List of Magnum P.I. season 3 episodes
No. overall	No. in season	Title	Directed by	Written by	Original release date	Prod. code	US viewers (millions)
41	1	"Double Jeopardy"	Bryan Spicer	Peter M. Lenkov & Eric Guggenheim	December 4, 2020	MPI301	5.50
Magnum and Higgins are hired by a couple, with the woman, Helen, saying she is trying to find her missing brother, Max. It turns out that the couple was using the detectives to lead them to Max, and when they do, Helen shoots and kills Max for making her take the rap and serve 16 years in prison for a homicide he committed. During their escape, Higgins is shot, and Magnum rushes her to the hospital. At the same time, the couple forces T.C. at gunpoint to take them to an airport in his chopper, but Rick uses an old trick to end that threat. Magnum is taken aback when he overhears Ethan, Higgins' surgeon, ask her out on a date. As the episode closes, a white SUV follows Magnum and Higgins as they leave the hospital in the Ferrari.
42	2	"Easy Money"	Bryan Spicer	David Wolkove	December 11, 2020	MPI302	5.69
Magnum and Higgins are hired to repossess a private jet. Upon boarding the plane and taking off, masked gunmen shoot at the plane, causing damage that forces Higgins to crash land shortly after takeoff. She and Magnum then find a wanted fugitive stowed away, who reveals the plane is owned by a cartel and he has been working with an undercover DEA agent. Rick, T.C., and Katsumoto assist with a successful rescue. After their first date, Higgins expresses concerns that Ethan is "too perfect." Meanwhile, Katsumoto has further news about the vehicle that followed Magnum and Higgins.
43	3	"No Way Out"	Eagle Egilsson	Barbie Kligman	December 18, 2020	MPI303	5.48
After concocting a story for a federal immigration agent looking into Juliet's two marriage license applications, she, Magnum, and T.C. are leaving the building when they hear gunshots. They make their way out of a stalled elevator, and discover the building's occupants have been taken hostage by a group of masked gunmen. Magnum is able to contact Katsumoto, who later learns from a CIA agent holding an accused conspirator named Ray Vaughn that Ray's brother is demanding an exchange: Ray for the hostages. Magnum, T.C., and Higgins engage in a number of schemes and deceptions to ultimately subdue the attackers. The immigration agent then says that while he didn't believe the group's story, Higgins is a hero and is welcome to stay in Hawaii.
44	4	"First the Beatdown, Then the Blowback"	Eagle Egilsson	Teleplay by : Eric Guggenheim & Mike Diaz; Story by : Aaron Lam & Peter M. Lenkov	January 8, 2021	MPI304	5.87
A man tells Katsumoto that his daughter, MMA fighter Kai Durrell, has not checked in as she usually does, and wants to report her missing. Katsumoto can't do anything because Kai hasn't been missing long enough, but he asks Magnum and Higgins to look into it after video evidence shows her getting into a vehicle with known members of a Japanese organized crime group. Magnum and Higgins learn that Kai is being forced to throw a high-stakes fight, and her father is later taken hostage by the mobsters to ensure her compliance. Meanwhile, Kumu is arrested after stealing a valuable 225-year old skull from a collector, stating that it was previously stolen from its rightful burial place.
45	5	"The Day Danger Walked In"	Krishna Rao	Peter M. Lenkov & Eric Guggenheim	January 15, 2021	MPI305	5.52
As the group hunkers down in Rick's bar to ride out a hurricane, along with several customers, they learn that two customers dressed as armored truck guards are actually thieves who killed the real guards. As Magnum and the team try to minimize the danger, they get help from an unlikely source: T.C.'s elderly friend Booky (Roger E. Mosley). Meanwhile, Magnum has a heart-to-heart with Higgins' boyfriend Ethan, and Rick worries about telling T.C. that he let the bar's hurricane insurance lapse during the pandemic.
46	6	"Tell No One"	Eagle Egilsson	Gene Hong	January 22, 2021	MPI306	5.86
A wealthy real estate developer hires Magnum and Higgins to find his missing wife. A kidnapper demands a $3 million ransom, but Magnum and Higgins find the wife dead anyway after the money is exchanged. The trail leads to the man's brother, who is in dire need of cash. However, Magnum and Higgins are bothered by how the kidnapper seemed to be aware of all their actions during their investigation. Further, the coroner determines the wife was dead at least eight hours before her husband got the call from the kidnappers. Elsewhere, Kumu tries to connect with Maleah, her late husband's illegitimate daughter, but her suspicion of Maleah's new boyfriend only deepens their divide.
47	7	"Killer on the Midnight Watch"	Geoff Shotz	Gene Hong	February 5, 2021	MPI307	5.70
Two men from a neighborhood watch ask Magnum and Higgins to investigate their neighbor, whom they suspect of being a murderer. The detectives tail the man and find a young Chinese woman in his trunk, but soon learn he is a good Samaritan trying to rescue girls from a sex trafficking ring. Meanwhile, Magnum's friend Jin has started a new, legitimate business, and meets an intriguing older woman who gives him a purpose for his first profits. Also, Magnum continues to have nightmares about being apprehended by men in a white SUV.
48	8	"Someone to Watch Over Me"	Geoff Shotz	Barbie Kligman	February 12, 2021	MPI308	5.76
Magnum and Higgins track down Paul, a 22-year old patient of Ethan's who fled after Ethan found a bullet in him that punctured a lung. Ethan says Paul has no more than a few hours to live without surgery. Magnum and Higgins learn of a secret involving Paul's family, an accidental shooting, and a 12-year old unsolved murder case. Meanwhile, T.C. offers to help his Marine friend with recruiting efforts, but soon realizes that one particular recruit is joining for the wrong reasons. Also, Rick hires Suzy, a woman he previously helped (S.2, Ep.19), to paint a mural on the newly-repaired bar wall. After learning she's down on her luck, Rick offers Suzy a bartender job.
49	9	"The Big Payback"	Yangzom Brauen	David Wolkove	February 19, 2021	MPI309	5.97
Higgins is abducted, and Magnum soon learns it's related to one of his first-ever cases as a P.I., in which he was forced to turn in his client, Elliott Hamler. Elliott's son, Miles, is now requiring Magnum and his team to break his father out of a prison transport van in exchange for Higgins' life. This means Magnum cannot ask HPD for help. After the situation is resolved, Rick gets closer to Suzy, with some help from Magnum.
50	10	"The Long Way Home"	Yangzom Brauen	Teleplay by : Katie Varney; Story by : Katie Varney and Peter M. Lenkov & Eric Guggenheim	March 5, 2021	MPI310	5.63
Magnum is hired by a woman looking for her missing husband, an Army Ranger who should be on a tour but apparently returned home and left her money. Magnum discovers that the man is likely suffering from survivor's guilt, and he enlists help from T.C. and Rick to find him before tragedy strikes. Meanwhile, Higgins and Ethan are enjoying some alone time on vacation when a hotel patron asks them to help find a lost engagement ring. Also, Gordon tries to bond with his son, Dennis, later learning that Dennis feels caught in the middle with his friends, given all the negative media coverage about cops.
51	11	"The Lies We Tell"	Rubba Nada	Katie Varney	March 26, 2021	MPI311	5.62
Magnum and Higgins are approached by Elena, a woman who was in the process of cheating on her husband when she witnessed her suitor being murdered in his home by two masked men. It turns out the suitor was a real estate agent pretending to live in the luxurious home, and was using the name of the real homeowner. While the P.I.s try to avoid contacting HPD due to the client's request for privacy, Katsumoto becomes involved when the victim's body washes ashore. Magnum and Higgins learn Elena was not alone, uncovering a blackmail ring with multiple victims. Meanwhile, Rick goes to visit Icepick in prison, only to learn he was transferred to a hospital and is near death.
52	12	"Dark Harvest"	Rubba Nada	Gene Hong	April 2, 2021	MPI312	5.37
Gina, a veteran and Shammy's friend, has her car stolen with her support dog inside. It turns out the car thief is a victim himself, and is fleeing the Korean mafia. Meanwhile, T.C. gets sued by a former chopper passenger for allegedly causing whiplash when he diverted the chopper to help Magnum. With Jin's help, T.C. and Rick determine it is a false accusation and an attempt at extortion.
53	13	"Cry Murder"	Peter Weller	Story by : Emily Singer; Teleplay by : Peter M. Lenkov & Eric Guggenheim	April 9, 2021	MPI313	5.61
A baby is left at the gate of Robin's Nest, making Magnum and Higgins want to find the mother before calling child protective services. However, that mission becomes difficult as the P.I.s also have a high-paying insurance case involving rare truffles valued at over $400,000 that have been stolen from an Italian restaurant. Magnum and Higgins smell something funny when they track down the supplier, who admits the truffles are cheap imitations and says the restaurant owner knew that.
54	14	"Whispers of Death"	Peter Weller	Tera Tolentino	April 16, 2021	MPI314	5.58
Magnum and Higgins are hired by a psychic who tells them a man is going to murder his wife the next day. Determined to see it through regardless of their skepticism, the two investigate the couple, only to learn from Katsumoto that the psychic was herself murdered. The P.I.s then learn that, to boost her reputation for accuracy, the psychic hid listening devices in the crystals she sold. However, she only heard part of the suspect husband's conversation, and he's really a mob hitman intent on killing someone else. The case hits Higgins hard, as she realizes she's also keeping a secret from Ethan about her MI6 past. Meanwhile, Kumu gets involved when a card with her name is found in a duffel bag full of stolen jewels, which she recognizes as once belonging to Imelda Marcos.
55	15	"Before the Fall"	Kurt Jones	Mike Diaz	April 30, 2021	MPI315	5.35
Magnum's Uncle Bernardo visits and later reveals a family secret, while Higgins confesses to Ethan about her past. T.C. is flying Shammy in his chopper with hopes that Shammy will train to be a pilot and serve as his backup, but Shammy is reluctant. During their flight, they witness people on a mountain stair attraction that is supposed to be closed for repairs, and T.C. later sees on the news that a woman fell from the steps and died. Recognizing the woman's shirt and knowing someone else was with her on the steps, T.C. takes the matter to Katsumoto, suspecting foul play. With Magnum's help, they are able to learn that the victim was getting close to the truth about her younger brother murdering her best friend. Ethan tells Higgins he thinks they need a break, and as such he will be going on a six-month assignment for Doctors Without Borders. Shammy comes clean with Rick about his apprehension over becoming a chopper pilot.
56	16	"Bloodline"	Avi Youabian	Eric Guggenheim & Geoffrey Thorne	May 7, 2021	MPI316	5.00
Magnum and Higgins help Chloe Dawson (Grace Victoria Cox), a graduate student Kumu hired to work in the cultural center. Chloe has just discovered a tracking device in her car's wheel well and feels like someone is stalking her. After determining the tracker was planted by a man named Braydon Marshall, the P.I.s look for him only to find him dead in the trunk of a rental car. The renter is found to be Henry Sellers, Chloe's father whom she was told had died 22 years ago. Henry returned to Hawaii to check up on Chloe following the death of her mother, but it appears his past as a Russian spy has caught up with him. Meanwhile, Ethan forgives Higgins for holding back information about her past, saying he can't bear the thought of losing her. He invites Higgins to accompany him on his trip to Kenya, and after some deliberation, she accepts.

=== Crossovers ===
Following the cancellation of Hawaii Five-0 in early 2020, numerous actors from the series still made appearances throughout the season, most notably Kimee Balmilero who recurred in the season as Dr. Noelani Cunha. In addition Shawn Mokuahi Garnett appeared in two episodes of the season as Flippa and Dennis Chun appeared as Honolulu Police Department Sergeant Duke Lukela in the seasons fourth episode.

== Production ==
=== Development ===
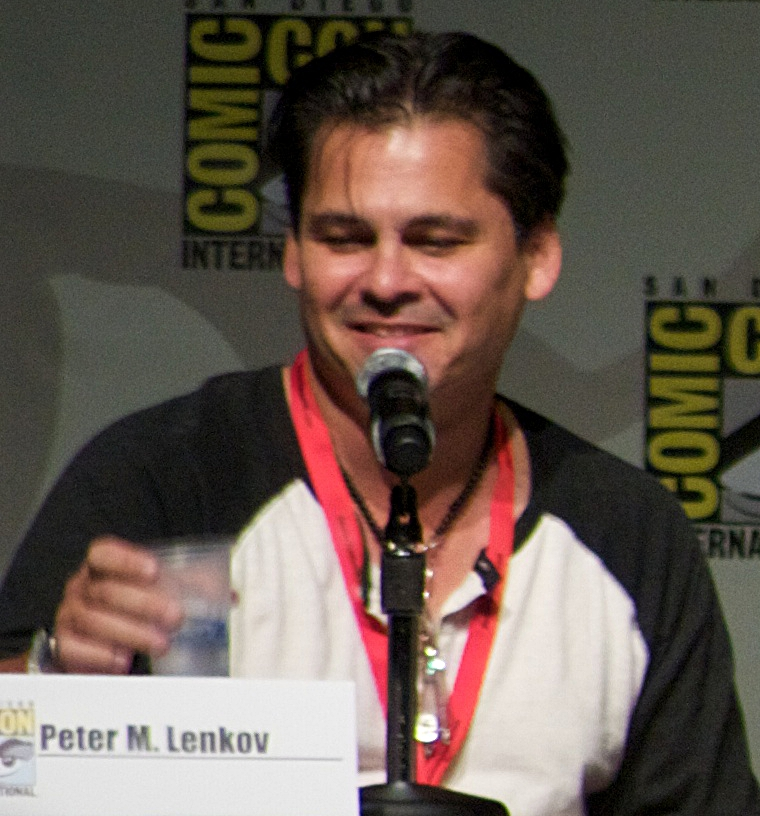
Co-showrunner, co-developer, and executive producer Peter M. Lenkov was fired by CBS after allegations over a toxic work environment.

On May 6, 2020, CBS renewed Magnum P.I. for a third season, along with eighteen other series including MacGyver, the second and only other remaining series from the Lenkov-verse after the cancellation of Hawaii Five-0. On July 7, 2020, it was revealed that co-showrunner, executive producer, and co-developer Peter M. Lenkov would not have any involvement in the season after being fired from CBS over toxic work environment allegations. Lenkov was originally expected to continue work on the series for another year after signing a three-year deal with CBS Television Studios in 2018. Lucas Till who portrays the title character of Angus MacGyver on MacGyver stated that Lenkov made him suicidal and constantly body shamed him. Lenkov's lawyers initially denied all allegations. Lenkov later responded to the situation by stating "It's difficult to hear that the working environment I ran was not the working environment my colleagues deserved, and for that, I am deeply sorry. I accept responsibility for what I am hearing and am committed to doing the work that is required to do better and be better." Lenkov still received writing credits for various episodes throughout the season written prior to his termination. Numerous production staff moved to the series also following the cancellation of Hawaii Five-0 including co-showrunner of its final season, David Wolkove, a line producer, and editors. Eight different writers wrote episodes throughout the season. Gene Hong replaced Lenkov as co-showrunner joining other co-showrunner Eric Guggenheim who also co-developed and executive-produces for the series. On October 27, 2020, it was reported that the season would have a reduced episode order of sixteen-episodes as a result of the COVID-19 pandemic. The season's main storylines revolved around a post-pandemic world; however, its effects continue to play a part in storylines throughout the season.

=== Filming ===
On July 1, 2020, it was revealed that the series was eyeing a delayed mid-August start date to begin filming as a result of the COVID-19 pandemic. Previous seasons had begun filming in July. In August 2020, it was announced that the series had been given permission to begin filming but had yet to set a start date; September 14, was later stated as a tentative start date to filming. Filming for the season began two days later on September 16, 2020, with a traditional Hawaiian blessing. COVID-19 protocols were required on set including the wearing of masks, social distancing, COVID testing, and reduced cast and crew on set. Due to the limited numbers of extras allowed on the set, crowd replication visual effects were used as a replacement. Kurt Jones, a cinematographer for the season, who also worked on Hawaii Five-0, directed the fifteenth produced episode of the season. Filming on the season concluded on March 4, 2021.

=== Casting ===
On October 16, 2020, it was announced that Jay Ali had been cast in a recurring role for the season as Dr. Ethan Shah, a love interest for the character of Juliet Higgins. It was later revealed that Lance Lim would also recur throughout the season as Dennis Katsumoto, the son of Detective Gordon Katsumoto. Roger E. Mosley, who portrayed Theodore Calvin on the original Magnum, P.I. reprised his role as John Booky from the first season of the rebooted series. Dennis Chun, who portrayed various minor characters on the original series also returned as Honolulu Police Department Sergeant Duke Lukela. Christopher Thornton, Kimee Balmilero, and Shawn Mokuahi Garnett continue to recur in the series after being introduced in the first season. Bobby Lee and Janel Parrish also reprised their roles after both being introduced as characters in the second season.

== Release ==
When CBS revealed its fall schedule for the 2020–2021 broadcast season it was revealed that Magnum P.I. would keep the timeslot it held in the previous season of Friday's at 9:00 PM ET. In October 2020, CBS announced premiere dates for its scripted series; Magnum P.I. and its Friday evening counterparts Blue Bloods and MacGyver remained absent from the schedule. In November 2020, CBS gave the season a premiere date of December 4, 2020; delayed from its usual late-September premiere date as a result of the COVID-19 pandemic. The season aired three episodes in December 2020 before taking its regular mid-season break and returned in January 2021. "The Lies We Tell," the seasons eleventh episode was originally scheduled to air on March 12, 2021. When CBS chose to air a rebroadcast of Oprah with Meghan and Harry in its place the episode was rescheduled to be broadcast on March 26. In March 2021, CBS announced that the season would conclude on May 7, 2021. In Canada, CTV aired the series in simulcast with CBS. In the United Kingdom, the third season began airing on Sky One on January 3, 2021.

== Ratings ==
Viewership and ratings per episode of Magnum P.I. (2018 TV series) season 3
No.	Title	Air date	Rating (18–49)	Viewers (millions)	DVR (18–49)	DVR viewers (millions)	Total (18–49)	Total viewers (millions)
1	"Double Jeopardy"	December 4, 2020	0.5	5.50	0.3	1.81	0.8	7.31
2	"Easy Money"	December 11, 2020	0.5	5.69	0.3	1.86	0.8	7.55
3	"No Way Out"	December 18, 2020	0.5	5.48	—N/a	—N/a	—N/a	—N/a
4	"First the Beatdown, Then the Blowback"	January 8, 2021	0.6	5.87	0.3	1.93	0.9	7.80
5	"The Day Danger Walked In"	January 15, 2021	0.5	5.52	0.3	1.84	0.8	7.36
6	"Tell No One"	January 22, 2021	0.6	5.86	—N/a	—N/a	—N/a	—N/a
7	"Killer on the Midnight Watch"	February 5, 2021	0.5	5.70	—N/a	—N/a	—N/a	—N/a
8	"Someone to Watch Over Me"	February 12, 2021	0.5	5.76	0.3	2.01	0.8	7.77
9	"The Big Payback"	February 19, 2021	0.6	5.97	0.3	1.97	0.9	7.94
10	"The Long Way Home"	March 5, 2021	0.5	5.63	—N/a	—N/a	—N/a	—N/a
11	"The Lies We Tell"	March 26, 2021	0.5	5.62	—N/a	—N/a	—N/a	—N/a
12	"Dark Harvest"	April 2, 2021	0.5	5.37	—N/a	—N/a	—N/a	—N/a
13	"Cry Murder"	April 9, 2021	0.5	5.61	—N/a	—N/a	—N/a	—N/a
14	"Whispers of Death"	April 16, 2021	0.5	5.58	—N/a	—N/a	—N/a	—N/a
15	"Before the Fall"	April 30, 2021	0.5	5.35	—N/a	—N/a	—N/a	—N/a
16	"Bloodline"	May 7, 2021	0.4	5.00	0.3	1.91	0.7	6.91

== Home media ==
Magnum P.I.: Season Three
Set details	Special features	
16 episodes; 4-disc set; 16:9 aspect ratio; Subtitles: English	Deleted scenes on select episodes; Gag reel	
DVD release dates
Region 1	Region 2	Region 4
September 14, 2021	TBA	N/a
Blu-ray release dates
Region A		Region B
TBA		TBA
