= Magnum P.I. (2018 TV series) season 4 =

Magnum P.I.
- Season 4
- United States DVD cover
- Showrunners: Eric Guggenheim; Gene Hong
- Starring: Jay Hernandez; Perdita Weeks; Zachary Knighton; Stephen Hill; Amy Hill; Tim Kang
- No. of episodes: 20

Release
- Original network: CBS
- Original release: October 1, 2021 – May 6, 2022

Season chronology
- ← Previous; Season 3 Next → Season 5

The fourth season of the American crime and action drama Magnum P.I. premiered on October 1, 2021, on CBS, for the 2021–22 television season. It concluded on May 6, 2022. The series is a remake of the 1980 series of the same name and centers on Thomas Magnum, a former Navy SEAL who works as a private investigator and solves mysteries with his business partner Juliet Higgins and other friends. It stars Jay Hernandez, Perdita Weeks, Zachary Knighton, Stephen Hill, Amy Hill, and Tim Kang. The season was ordered on April 15, 2021, and consisted of twenty episodes. On May 12, 2022, it was announced that CBS had canceled the series after four seasons, however, on June 30, 2022, the series was picked up by NBC for a fifth and sixth seasons, consisting of twenty episodes. Dennis Chun appeared in the sixteenth episode of the season as his Hawaii Five-0 character in a minor crossover event. The season premiere, "Island Vibes", was watched by 5.23 million viewers.

== Cast and characters ==
=== Main ===
- Jay Hernandez as Thomas Magnum, a former Navy SEAL who is a security consultant for the successful novelist Robin Masters, living in the guest house on his estate, while also working as a private investigator
- Perdita Weeks as Juliet Higgins, a former MI6 agent who is majordomo to Robin Masters; she and Magnum bicker but become allies
- Zachary Knighton as Orville "Rick" Wright, a Marine veteran and former door gunner, who runs his own tiki bar and is also a playboy
- Stephen Hill as Theodore "T.C." Calvin, a Marine veteran and helicopter pilot who runs helicopter tours of Hawaii and is a member of Magnum's team
- Amy Hill as Teuila "Kumu" Tuileta, the cultural curator of Robin Masters' estate
- Tim Kang as Honolulu Police Department (HPD) Detective Gordon Katsumoto, who dislikes Magnum but usually comes to the team's aid when needed

=== Recurring ===
- Martin Martinez as Cade Jensen
- Christopher Thornton as Kenny "Shammy" Shamberg
- Jay Ali as Ethan Shah
- Chantal Thuy as HPD Detective Lia Kaleo
- Bobby Lee as Jin Jeong
- Marsha Thomason as Eve
- Betsy Phillips as Suzy

=== Notable guests ===
- Sebastian Roché as Zev Marker
- Robert Baker as Randall
- Kaylee Hottle as Joon, Jin's niece
- Nikki Hahn as Amanda Davis
- Devon Sawa as Robbie Nelson
- Greg Ellis as Sean Cavendish
- Brooke Nevin as Emily
- Levy Tran as Tia Min
- Maya Stojan as Maya
- Domenick Lombardozzi as Sebastian Nuzo
- Janel Parrish as Maleah
- Parker Queenan as Ryder Simmons
- Emily Alabi as Mahina, a firefighter
- Hala Finley as Ella Vaughn
- Niall Matter as Cole Vaughn
- Robert Pine as Daniel "Danny" Braddock
- Max Gail as Bob Braddock

=== Crossover ===
- Dennis Chun as HPD Sergeant Duke Lukela

== Episodes ==
The number in the "No. overall" column refers to the episode's number within the overall series, whereas the number in the "No. in season" column refers to the episode's number within this particular season. Numerous episodes are named after similarly named episodes from the original series. "Production code" refers to the order in which the episodes were produced while "U.S. viewers (millions)" refers to the number of viewers in the U.S. in millions who watched the episode as it was aired.

List of Magnum P.I. season 4 episodes
No. overall	No. in season	Title	Directed by	Written by	Original release date	Prod. code	US viewers (millions)
57	1	"Island Vibes"	Bryan Spicer	Eric Guggenheim & Gene Hong	October 1, 2021	MPI401	5.23
With Higgins still overseas, Magnum goes solo and solves the case of his new client, who initially disappeared before they could meet for the first time. In Kenya, Higgins goes on a mission to recover stolen vaccines, but is forced to return to Hawaii without Ethan after learning from MI6 that she is in danger. Rick and Suzy finally begin a relationship, only to have Suzy get accepted into an art program in San Diego. With Rick's blessing, she chooses to leave Hawaii. Magnum and Katsumoto's new partner, Lia Kaleo, attempt to keep their new relationship hidden from the rest of HPD.
58	2	"The Harder They Fall"	Doug Hannah	David Wolkove	October 8, 2021	MPI402	5.20
When an ex-con dies in a fall at his construction job, his wife hires Magnum and Higgins to look into the incident, believing it was no accident. Elsewhere, T.C. takes Shammy on one more chopper trip with clients before his first solo flight, but the two customers turn out to be armed drug dealers who force them to land in a field on Molokai. As the episode closes, Higgins deduces that Magnum is dating Detective Kaleo.
59	3	"Texas Wedge"	Antonio Negret	Gene Hong	October 15, 2021	MPI403	5.37
When golf bags are stolen at a local golf club, Higgins and Magnum are hired by the accused staff member to exonerate him. They discover the bags were used to smuggle illegal ivory. At La Mariana, Jin asks T.C. to perpetuate a lie he told his niece about where he got the money to help her and her mother for years. He ultimately tells his niece that he's not a high rolling businessman, but she forgives him. Also, Higgins does a job for MI6, and learns it is just the beginning of what they need from her. Ethan tells Higgins he is staying in Kenya for another 6 months.
60	4	"Those We Leave Behind"	Allison Liddi-Brown	Barbie Kligman	October 22, 2021	MPI404	5.07
While Dennis Katsumoto is driving with his mother, the two are carjacked and Dennis suffers a critical head injury when he is thrown to the pavement. Higgins brings Magnum a case of a teenage girl who committed suicide, not telling him she got the case while seeing a therapist, as the therapist strongly feels the girl was not suicidal. While working the case, Magnum was also able to help Gordon locate the carjackers who hurt his son. Dennis has successful surgery to repair a brain bleed.
61	5	"Til Death"	Eagle Egilsson	Katie Varney	November 5, 2021	MPI405	5.59
Magnum and Higgins take the case of a groom-to-be wanting last-minute proof that his fiancée is not cheating, but they find that the woman has a much more sinister past. Meanwhile, T.C. enlists Kumu's help to find Cade, the teenager who buses tables at La Mariana, after the boy disappears. Also, Higgins realizes that what she feels for Ethan isn't true love.
62	6	"Devil on the Doorstep"	Claudia Yarmy	Tera Tolentino	November 12, 2021	MPI406	5.45
A reporter fears a source in Hawaii may be in danger after she led him to write an article about a deceased Jane Doe. Upon hiring Magnum and Higgins to help, the reporter says the source believed there was something bigger behind the woman's death, but she's now gone quiet. Magnum handles the case without Higgins, as she lies about needing to meet with immigration concerning her trip to Kenya. In reality, Higgins has another assignment from MI6, later learning she may be a target herself. Elsewhere, Robbie, Rick's childhood friend from Chicago, comes to Hawaii needing help restarting his life after several stints in prison. Rick later learns the FBI is looking into a murder with Robbie being the prime suspect.
63	7	"A New Lease on Death"	Rubba Nadda	Teleplay by : Barbie Kligman; Story by : Barbie Kilgman & Zachary Knighton	November 19, 2021	MPI407	5.17
A woman hires Magnum and Higgins to figure out how her father Joseph (Richard Gant), who lives in a retirement community, lost his entire life savings of $43,000. Kumu goes undercover as a new resident and gathers information about the others who live there. Complications arise when the resident accused of conning Joseph into an investment scheme ends up dead. Meanwhile, Rick learns that his friend Robbie was involved with an Albanian mob in Chicago. Robbie claims that he was forced to kill a man whom he did not know was a federal agent. While helping Rick, Magnum learns that a pair of Albanians tracked Robbie to Hawaii. After Robbie gets in a car to go to the airport, the car explodes.
64	8	"A Fire in the Ashes"	Lisa Robinson	David Slack	December 3, 2021	MPI408	5.34
Still reeling over the death of his friend Robbie, Rick also has to deal with being a possible target as the Albanian gang members are still at large. Higgins is offered a position with the rogue group trying to expose MI6 secrets, which she accepts as a way to destroy whatever information they have. Things come to a head when she is forced to roughly interrogate her Hawaiian contact. Having figured out Higgins' secret, Magnum eventually comes to her aid.
65	9	"Better Watch Out"	Ruba Nadda	Katie Varney	December 10, 2021	MPI409	5.39
A cyber-attack on HPD is soon revealed to be an inside job, after Lia reveals her brother has ties to a known mob boss on the island. It's later discovered that the mob's motive is not money. It was about infiltrating HPD. Meanwhile, Cade is surprisingly despondent after T.C., Rick, Kumu and others pitch in to buy him a used truck.
66	10	"Dream Lover"	Avi Youabian	David Wolkove	January 7, 2022	MPI410	5.32
Higgins is troubled by persistent dreams and asks her psychiatrist for another appointment. Magnum and Higgins are looking for proof of infidelity for a new client. They get the proof and then ask Rick to serve the man with divorce papers. In the meantime, an unknown man at a coffee shop surreptitiously leaves a memory card in the purse of a girl he “accidentally” ran into. The girl engages Higgins and Magnum to track him down for the purposes of pursuing him romantically, but they later learn the man is out to avenge his sister's death.
67	11	"If I Should Die Before I Wake"	Lin Oeding	Gene Hong & Andre Jackson	January 14, 2022	MPI411	5.77
Jin starts a dog walking business, and Higgins hires him to walk Zeus and Apollo. He inadvertently poisons them with chocolate and has to take them to a veterinary clinic. A church receives a large anonymous donation speckled with blood and engages Magnum and Higgins to investigate the source of the cash. They eventually discover two thieves are involved, who are holding Jin and the others at the veterinary clinic hostage while the veterinarian treats one of the thieves for a gunshot wound. Suzy later drops a bombshell on Rick via a FaceTime call.
68	12	"Angels Sometimes Kill"	Marcus Stokes	Story by : Mike Diaz; Teleplay by : Mike Diaz & Barbie Kligman	January 21, 2022	MPI412	5.43
T.C. offers to foster Cade, after Gordon discovered Cade was not in social care and was living in T.C.'s hangar office. Magnum and Higgins investigate the disappearance of one of Shammy's friends, discovering he had been deliberately killed in a hit and run and uncovering an insurance scam. Higgins gives ownership of Robin's Nest back to Robin Masters because MI6 has fast-tracked her US citizenship. Rick shows everyone Suzy's pre-natal scan. Lia and Magnum break up.
69	13	"Judge Me Not"	Benny Boom	David Slack	January 28, 2022	MPI413	5.22
Judge Rachel Park (Moon Bloodgood) hires Magnum and Higgins to discover who is trying to blackmail her, after a photo of Park's brief past as an escort is sent to her phone. It transpires she is being blackmailed to throw a murder trial over which she is presiding. Magnum and Higgins have to contend with Maya (Maya Stojan), who is working for the blackmailer to stop them. With a new baby now on the way, Rick tries to improve La Mariana to increase profits.
70	14	"Run, Baby, Run"	Roderick Davis	David Wolkove	February 25, 2022	MPI414	5.21
A bail bondsman who years ago gave Magnum some of his first cases hires him and Higgins to track down a woman who has fled following a possession charge, leaving the bondsman on the hook for $250,000 bail. Lia Kaleo helps on the HPD side but worries about her already tarnished reputation when it's suspected that an HPD narcotics detective may be involved. Magnum learns the bondsman's client is pregnant and is being blackmailed to give up her baby to the narcotics detective and his wife, who cannot have children. Elsewhere, Gordon tells T.C. he's obligated to try and find Cade's mother before finalizing the adoption. His investigation leads him to discover that Cade's mother died in a fire after blacking out from drug use.
71	15	"Dead Man Walking"	David Straiton	Gene Hong	March 4, 2022	MPI415	4.88
Magnum is given a fatal poison which will kill him in eight hours unless he "earns" the antidote by finding the kidnapped son of Osi Shima, a Yakuza boss. Higgins and Magnum's friends attempt to find the poison antidote. Magnum discovers the kidnapping was an inside job, done to start a war with the local Korean mob, and fights through his deteriorating faculties to prevent it.
72	16	"Evil Walks Softly"	Alexandra La Roche	Tera Tolentino	March 11, 2022	MPI416	5.01
An office block is bombed. Nora comes to Magnum and Higgins saying she thinks the suspect is her son Ryder and asks them to find him. While serving food to the emergency workers, T.C. accidentally meets Mahina, an old acquaintance with whom he had a one-night stand. Magnum and Higgins find Ryder who confesses to planting the bomb, but it's later discovered Ryder acted under duress from their neighbor Pete, who is planning a heist on a nearby FBI facility. Magnum compares his relationship with his own mother to Ryder's and Nora's. Mahina shows up at La Mariana and T.C. apologizes, saying he only ghosted her because his then-girlfriend suddenly reappeared in his life.
73	17	"Remember Me Tomorrow" "Sleep with the Fishes"	Bryan Spicer	Mike Diaz & Barbie Kligman & Katie Varney	April 1, 2022	MPI417	4.87
Suzy returns, but she wants to live apart from Rick. Magnum is visiting Bob, a terminally ill Vietnam vet, and reunites him with his estranged brother. Higgins is hired by a young girl, Ella, to investigate the triple homicide that her late mother had been working on. They discover one of the murder victims had been having an affair with Clara, a neighbor, who had killed them all including accidentally her lover. Clara tries to gas herself and Higgins, but they are rescued by Gordon.
74	18	"Shallow Grave, Deep Water"	Jay Hernandez	David Slack	April 8, 2022	MPI418	5.31
Magnum arranges a full military memorial service for Bob. Higgins is starting a friendship with Ella's father, Cole. The body of Bruce Fletcher is discovered in a shallow forest grave and Magnum's late teammate Sebastian Nuzo (from season 1) is a suspect. Magnum and Higgins discover they were partners in an underwater salvage operation and had accidentally found a sunken shipping container full of dead immigrants. The members of the illegal immigrant trafficking ring are arrested, and Nuzo's name is cleared.
75	19	"The Long Sleep"	Eagle Egilsson	Mike Diaz & Andre Jackson & David Wolkove	April 29, 2022	MPI419	4.81
Magnum finally comes to terms with his romantic feelings for Higgins and tries asking if she would spend the day with him until they are interrupted when Greg contacts them. He was drugged in Wisconsin and woke up 2 days later on a Hawaiian beach. As he regains his memory, Magnum, Higgins and HPD discover his recently murdered grandfather was a partner in a diamond heist, and his grandfather's partner's daughter abducted Greg in order to retrieve the diamonds. Higgins admits to her psychiatrist her romantic feelings for Magnum but is fearful of jeopardizing their friendship and partnership. Meanwhile, Cade's grandmother visits and they have an uncomfortable meeting while Rick prepares for fatherhood.
76	20	"Close to Home"	Bryan Spicer	Eric Guggenheim	May 6, 2022	MPI420	5.06
Gordon's ex-wife Beth is kidnapped, and the kidnappers want Gordon to kill his ex-partner Whelan who is in prison. Magnum and Higgins help Gordon break Whelan out of prison and discover the blackmailer is Ray Nasano who was also responsible for Gordon's sister Kim's death. They rescue Beth and catch Ray, but Gordon is suspended from HPD. Meanwhile Suzy gives birth to a baby girl. Higgins and Magnum admit their feelings to each other, and kiss.

=== Crossovers ===
Despite Hawaii Five-0 ending in 2020, Dennis Chun still made a guest appearance in the sixteenth episode of the season as his Hawaii Five-0 character, Honolulu Police Department Sergeant Duke Lukela, after making a guest appearance in all three previous seasons of Magnum P.I.

== Production ==
=== Development ===
On April 15, 2021, it was announced that CBS had renewed Magnum P.I. for a fourth season. This came following the announcement that MacGyver had been canceled after five seasons, leaving Magnum P.I. as the last remaining series in the Lenkov-verse. The series' writers have confirmed that it will be a full season consisting of eighteen to twenty-two episodes, later stating it will be twenty. Christopher Duddy joined the series as the director of photography after previously doing the same job on MacGyver. Multiple crew members left the series prior to the season to work on NCIS: Hawaiʻi. On May 12, 2022, CBS canceled the series after four seasons, however, on June 30, 2022, the series was picked up by NBC for a fifth and sixth seasons, consisting of twenty episodes.

=== Casting ===
On August 27, 2021, it was announced that Chantal Thuy had been cast in an undisclosed capacity as Lia Kaleo, an HPD detective who is Katsumoto's partner and Magnum's secret girlfriend. On September 28, 2021, Martin Martinez was cast in a recurring role as Cade Jensen, a troubled teenager looking for a job at La Mariana who ends up bonding with T.C. On December 30, 2021, it was reported that Levy Tran had been cast in a guest-starring role as Tia Min, a bodyguard for a powerful crime lord. Tran previously portrayed a different character as a series regular on MacGyver. Christopher Thornton, Bobby Lee, and Jay Ali returned as Kenny "Shammy" Shamberg, Jin Jeong, and Ethan Shah, respectively, after being introduced in previous seasons.

=== Filming ===
Filming for the season began July 20, 2021, with a traditional Hawaiian blessing. Filming concluded on March 9, 2022.

== Release ==
In May 2021, it was confirmed that Magnum P.I. would keep the timeslot it held for previous two seasons of Fridays at 9:00 PM ET. In July 2021, the season was revealed to be premiering on October 1, 2021. The series continues to lead into Blue Bloods and follows S.W.A.T. and Undercover Boss.

== Ratings ==
Viewership and ratings per episode of Magnum P.I. (2018 TV series) season 4
No.	Title	Air date	Rating (18–49)	Viewers (millions)	DVR (18–49)	DVR viewers (millions)	Total (18–49)	Total viewers (millions)
1	"Island Vibes"	October 1, 2021	0.4	5.23	—N/a	—N/a	—N/a	—N/a
2	"The Harder They Fall"	October 8, 2021	0.4	5.20	—N/a	—N/a	—N/a	—N/a
3	"Texas Wedge"	October 15, 2021	0.4	5.37	—N/a	—N/a	—N/a	—N/a
4	"Those We Leave Behind"	October 22, 2021	0.4	5.07	0.3	2.09	0.7	7.16
5	"Til Death"	November 5, 2021	0.4	5.59	—N/a	—N/a	—N/a	—N/a
6	"Devil on the Doorstep"	November 12, 2021	0.4	5.45	—N/a	—N/a	—N/a	—N/a
7	"A New Lease on Death"	November 19, 2021	0.4	5.17	0.2	2.06	0.7	7.23
8	"A Fire in the Ashes"	December 3, 2021	0.4	5.34	0.2	2.00	0.7	7.34
9	"Better Watch Out"	December 10, 2021	0.5	5.39	0.3	2.07	0.8	7.46
10	"Dream Lover"	January 7, 2022	0.5	5.32	—N/a	—N/a	—N/a	—N/a
11	"If I Should Die Before I Wake"	January 14, 2022	0.5	5.77	—N/a	—N/a	—N/a	—N/a
12	"Angels Sometimes Kill"	January 21, 2022	0.5	5.43	—N/a	—N/a	—N/a	—N/a
13	"Judge Me Not"	January 28, 2022	0.5	5.22	—N/a	—N/a	—N/a	—N/a
14	"Run, Baby, Run"	February 25, 2022	0.4	5.21	—N/a	—N/a	—N/a	—N/a
15	"Dead Man Walking"	March 4, 2022	0.4	4.88	—N/a	—N/a	—N/a	—N/a
16	"Evil Walks Softly"	March 11, 2022	0.4	5.01	—N/a	—N/a	—N/a	—N/a
17	"Remember Me Tomorrow"	April 1, 2022	0.4	4.87	—N/a	—N/a	—N/a	—N/a
18	"Shallow Grave, Deep Water"	April 8, 2022	0.4	5.31	—N/a	—N/a	—N/a	—N/a
19	"The Long Sleep"	April 29, 2022	0.3	4.81	—N/a	—N/a	—N/a	—N/a
20	"Close to Home"	May 6, 2022	0.3	5.06	—N/a	—N/a	—N/a	—N/a

== Home media ==
Magnum P.I.: Season Four
Set details	Special features	
20 episodes; 5-disc set; 16:9 aspect ratio; Subtitles: English	Deleted scenes on select episodes; Gag reel	
DVD release dates
Region 1	Region 2	Region 4
September 13, 2022	TBA	N/a
Blu-ray release dates
Region A		Region B
TBA		TBA
