= Magnum P.I. (2018 TV series) season 2 =

Season of television series

Magnum P.I.
- Season 2
- American DVD cover
- Showrunners: Peter M. Lenkov; Eric Guggenheim
- Starring: Jay Hernandez; Perdita Weeks; Zachary Knighton; Stephen Hill; Amy Hill; Tim Kang
- No. of episodes: 20

Release
- Original network: CBS
- Original release: September 27, 2019 – May 8, 2020

Season chronology
- ← Previous; Season 1 Next → Season 3

The second season of the crime and action drama Magnum P.I. premiered on September 27, 2019, on CBS, for the 2019–20 United States network television schedule. The series is a remake of the 1980 series of the same name and centers on Thomas Magnum, a former Navy SEAL who works as a private investigator and solves mysteries with his business partner Juliet Higgins and other friends. It stars Jay Hernandez, Perdita Weeks, Zachary Knighton, Stephen Hill, Amy Hill, and Tim Kang. The season was ordered on January 25, 2019, for a twenty-episode season. Multiple Hawaii Five-0 stars appeared as their Hawaii Five-0 characters in a two-part crossover event as well as in guest roles throughout the season in minor crossover events.

The season was split into two parts, with the first part concluding on January 31, 2020, after airing fourteen episodes, to allow for MacGyver to enter the television schedule as a mid-season replacement. It then continued airing its remaining six episodes on April 10, 2020, holding the timeslot that was freed up by Hawaii Five-0 airing its series finale. The season was viewed by an average of 8.91 million viewers and ranked 27 out of all television series for the season. "Payback For Beginners," the season premiere, brought in 6.40 million viewers while "A Leopard on the Prowl," the season finale was viewed by 6.49 million. "Desperate Measures," the seasons twelfth episode, which also served as the conclusion to the two-part fictional crossover with Hawaii Five-0, was the highest viewed episode of the season at 8.76 million. The season concluded on May 8, 2020, and was renewed for a third season that premiered on December 4, 2020.

== Cast and characters ==
=== Main ===
- Jay Hernandez as Thomas Magnum, a former Navy SEAL who is a security consultant for the successful novelist Robin Masters, living in the guest house on his estate, while also working as a private investigator
- Perdita Weeks as Juliet Higgins, a former MI6 agent who is majordomo to Robin Masters; she and Magnum bicker but become allies
- Zachary Knighton as Orville "Rick" Wright, a friend of Magnum's who is a Marine veteran and former door gunner, who runs his own tiki bar and is also a playboy
- Stephen Hill as Theodore "T.C." Calvin, a friend of Magnum's who is a Marine veteran and helicopter pilot who runs helicopter tours of Hawaii
- Amy Hill as Teuila "Kumu" Tuileta, the cultural curator of Robin Masters' estate
- Tim Kang as Honolulu Police Department (HPD) Detective Gordon Katsumoto, who dislikes Magnum but usually comes to the team's aid when needed.

=== Recurring ===
- Christopher Thornton as Kenny "Shammy" Shamberg
- Bobby Lee as Jin Jeong

=== Notable guests ===
- Brooke Lyons as Abby Miller
- Deontay Wilder as Noah
- Aaron Donald as himself
- Corbin Bernsen as Icepick
- Hans Hedemann as himself
- Patrick Monahan as himself
- Skylar Grey as herself
- Jerry Becker as himself
- Luis Carlos Maldonado as himself
- Stephanie Lum as herself
- Domenick Lombardozzi as Sebastian Nuzo
- Louis Lombardi as Paulie Nuzo
- James Remar as Captain Buck Greene
- Peter Facinelli as Gene Curtis/Ivan
- Melissa Tang as Erin Hong
- Chef Roy Yamaguchi as himself
- Janel Parrish as Maleah
- Andre Reed as Eddie Butler and himself
- Betsy Phillips as Suzy Madison
- Cowboy Cerrone as Reese
- Sonya Balmores as Leanna Owens
- Bre Blair as Lina
- Eve Brenner as Helen
- Barbara Eve Harris as Lucy Akina
- Catherine Dent as Georgia Preston

=== Crossover ===
- Larry Manetti as Nicky "The Kid" DeMarco
- Taylor Wily as Kamekona Tupuola
- Kimee Balmilero as Dr. Noelani Cunha
- William Forsythe as Harry Brown
- Shawn Mokuahi Garnett as Flippa
- Willie Garson as Gerard Hirsch
- Meaghan Rath as Tani Rey
- Katrina Law as Quinn Liu
- Beulah Koale as Junior Reigns
- Dennis Chun as HPD Sergeant Duke Lukela
- Ian Anthony Dale as Adam Noshimuri

== Episodes ==
The number in the "No. overall" column refers to the episode's number within the overall series, whereas the number in the "No. in season" column refers to the episode's number within this particular season. Numerous episodes are named after similarly named episodes from the original series. "Production code" refers to the order in which the episodes were produced while "U.S. viewers (millions)" refers to the number of viewers in the U.S. in millions who watched the episode as it was aired.

=== Part 1 ===
List of Magnum P.I. season 2 episodes
No. overall	No. in season	Title	Directed by	Written by	Original release date	Prod. code	US viewers (millions)
21	1	"Payback for Beginners" "Payback is for Beginners"	Bryan Spicer	Peter M. Lenkov & Eric Guggenheim	September 27, 2019	MPI201	6.40
A missing persons case turns sour when Magnum discovers that his client's wife was linked to a bank robbery. Also, Rick quits the club scene, and Higgins is "recalled" to London.
22	2	"Honor Among Thieves"	Carlos Bernard	Gene Hong	October 4, 2019	MPI203	6.09
An incorrigible pickpocket, Jin (Bobby Lee), asks Magnum for help when a cell phone he recently lifted receives a very suspicious text message. Also, Magnum is frustrated when Higgins still won't give him an answer to whether or not she will become his partner, and when Rick decides to make a bold career move, TC comes to his rescue.
23	3	"Knight Lasts Forever"	Eagle Egilsson	Neil Tolkin	October 11, 2019	MPI202	6.43
When a team of mercenaries tricks Higgins into letting them take over Robin's Nest, their assignment to hunt down the "White Knight" of Robin Masters' novels gets far too real. At the end of it all, Higgins finally agrees to partner up with Magnum.
24	4	"Dead Inside"	Krishna Rao	Barbie Kligman	October 18, 2019	MPI204	5.79
Katsumoto comes to Magnum and Higgins to look into a fellow cop suspected of being dirty, only to realize they're going after the wrong man. Meanwhile, Aaron Donald asks Magnum and his friends to recover his stolen tablet computer because it contains the Los Angeles Rams playbook, but the culprit turns out to be someone completely unexpected.
25	5	"Make It 'Til Dawn"	Bryan Spicer	Gene Hong & Tera Tolentino	October 25, 2019	MPI206	5.97
Jin the compulsive pickpocket, in a convoluted attempt to go straight as a bail bondsman, comes to Magnum for help tracking down a skip-trace at a Halloween party, but things get even more complicated with a notorious serial killer on the loose, leading to a showdown in a haunted house where Rick and Higgins are staying on a dare. Meanwhile, TC and Kumu protect a sacred Hawaiian burial ground from a developer's construction crew.
26	6	"Lie, Cheat, Steal, Kill"	Ron Underwood	Alfredo Barrios Jr.	November 1, 2019	MPI205	6.42
Magnum's lawyer girlfriend Abby (Brooke Lyons) asks for his help in a sensitive off-the-books case investigating a novelist suspected of murder, leading to a long and winding case of literary plagiarism and serial killing. Because the killer was Abby's client, she gets disbarred in Hawaii and tells Magnum she is leaving to start a legal clinic on the mainland.
27	7	"The Man in the Secret Room"	Allison Liddi-Brown	Joe Gazzam	November 8, 2019	MPI208	6.69
Filling in for a friend as a hotel detective, Magnum tries to contain his heartbreak over Abby's departure while investigating a mystery involving the death of a journalist and a secret hotel bungalow. Meanwhile, Icepick (Corbin Bernsen), Rick's father figure, is evasive with Rick about the reason for his recent release.
28	8	"He Came by Night"	Antonio Negret	Barbie Kligman	November 15, 2019	MPI207	6.55
Magnum and Higgins experience their first major differences when a client who has become an unwilling drug mule for dealers seeks help to recover stolen money; Magnum wants to respect the client's wishes to leave the police out of it, while Higgins thinks they should contact Katsumoto. Meanwhile, Rick convinces Train to play at his tiki bar and TC looks into an apparent case of identity theft by a fellow veteran only to find a complicated history of love and correspondence worthy of a Nicholas Sparks novel.
29	9	"A Bullet Named Fate"	Doug Hannah	Story by : Scarlett Lacey & Neil Tolkin; Teleplay by : Neil Tolkin	November 22, 2019	MPI209	6.72
Magnum sets out to avenge the shooting of friend and fellow P.I. Harry Brown (William Forsythe), who took over a probate case that Magnum declined in favor of a higher-paying job, and he and Higgins stumble into a three-year-old history of unsolved child disappearances. Meanwhile, Kumu leads a protest to protect a wilderness area from developers. She is joined by a 16-year old acquaintance, whose mother becomes furious at Kumu when the girl is arrested for civil disobedience.
30	10	"Blood Brothers"	Peter Weller	Peter M. Lenkov & Eric Guggenheim	December 6, 2019	MPI210	6.33
Nuzo's brother Paulie (Louis Lombardi) comes to Magnum and his team to get them to help him smuggle in an Afghani boy whom they had bonded with during their military service, dodging ICE and human traffickers all the while.
31	11	"Day I Met the Devil"	Kristin Windell	Alfredo Barrios Jr.	December 13, 2019	MPI211	6.12
Magnum's former C.O., Captain Buck Greene (James Remar), calls him up from the reserves to tackle a secret mission in the "triple frontier" area of South America. Magnum wants to bring T.C. and Rick along to help, but Greene tells him a team has already been selected. When he arrives, Magnum soon realizes Greene lied and he is on a suicide mission. The ringleader, an arms dealer named Gene (Peter Facinelli), is revealed to be the mysterious Ivan, the man who sent mercenaries to Robin's Nest in search of the "White Knight" (ep. 2.3). Greene's confession has Higgins worried that something is amiss, so she arranges a rescue with help from T.C., Rick, Shammy and Katsumoto. While Magnum is rescued, Ivan escapes.
32	12	"Desperate Measures"	Maja Vrvillo	Peter M. Lenkov & Eric Guggenheim	January 3, 2020	MPI212	7.83
When Hong, a man that Magnum and Higgins are monitoring for a client, gets shot and killed and his killer escapes, the team from Hawaii Five-0 gets involved. Magnum, Higgins, TC and Rick assist as the group recovers a secret list of CIA double-agents. Soon after, Junior Reigns is kidnapped as leverage for the criminals to get the list back, leading to Magnum's team helping Tani Rey and Quinn Liu in a search-and-rescue mission. Note : This episode concludes a crossover event that begins on Hawaii Five-0 season 10 episode 12.
33	13	"Mondays Are For Murder"	Alexandra LaRoche	Story by : Peter M. Lenkov & Eric Guggenheim; Teleplay by : Alfredo Barrios Jr.	January 10, 2020	MPI213	7.04
While Magnum and TC are working undercover as efficiency experts at a sunblock company's headquarters, they get hired to look into an "accidental" death in a stairwell. As they get lost on a trail of red herrings, they require an insider...someone whom Magnum encountered on a previous case. Meanwhile, Rick tries to figure out why Higgins faked an injury to get herself removed from the case.
34	14	"A Game of Cat and Mouse"	Roderick Davis	Gene Hong	January 31, 2020	MPI216	7.05
Jin the pickpocket calls Magnum and Higgins from jail with information about an imminent assassination, forcing Magnum and Higgins to bail him out of jail to track down the killer. After the assassination goes wrong, their work gets even more complicated when the shooter goes on the run.

=== Part 2 ===
List of Magnum P.I. season 2 episodes
No. overall	No. in season	Title	Directed by	Written by	Original release date	Prod. code	US viewers (millions)
35	15	"Say Hello to Your Past"	Avi Youabian	Joe Gazzam	April 10, 2020	MPI215	7.40
Kumu is kidnapped by Milo (Dohn Norwood), a man who has been shot and is on the run from the law. Milo says he'll be arrested for killing his wife over stolen drug money, but insists he is innocent of the murder. As Magnum and his team hunt for the real killer, Kumu's captor tells a poignant story about second chances that helps her confront her own past.
36	16	"Farewell to Love"	Bronwen Hughes	Ashley Charbonnet & Alfredo Barrios Jr.	April 17, 2020	MPI214	7.14
Magnum and Higgins go undercover as a couple on a romantic wilderness tour to tail a man suspected of cheating on his wife. However, their original assignment takes a back seat when an older man on the tour, who recently remarried, is found dead in a body of water down a steep drop. Magnum determines the man was dead before the fall, making everyone in the tour group a suspect. Elsewhere, TC reconnects with his old flame Teresa (Meagan Holder), who he learns moved on and married another man while TC was missing in action.
37	17	"The Night Has Eyes"	David Straiton	Ashley Charbonnet	April 24, 2020	MPI217	7.20
Magnum and Higgins are hired to recover a stolen urn containing the ashes of a woman's late husband. When the thief is found murdered soon after, the trail leads to a decades-old case of blackmail. Meanwhile, Higgins tells Magnum she overstayed her visa and likely has to return to the UK for an extended time, prompting Magnum to suggest they get married. Also, Rick and TC encounter a car salesman (played by Andre Reed, who also appears as himself) who pretends to be NFL player Andre Reed.
38	18	"A World of Trouble"	Peter Weller	Tera Tolentino & Neil Tolkin	May 1, 2020	MPI219	7.21
Magnum's marriage to Higgins approaches and everyone is involved in the preparations except Katsumoto, who tries to talk Higgins out of going through with the marriage solely to get her green card. The current case is to help an anonymous benefactor for a school who has suddenly gone missing, but the gifts she gave the school are revealed to have been stolen. Rick and TC help a now-retired veteran as he tries to transition to civilian life after 30 years in the Marines. Higgins decides it will be safer and easier if she marries TC instead of Magnum.
39	19	"May The Best One Win"	Rocky Carroll	Gene Hong	May 8, 2020	MPI218	6.87
Magnum learns through a divorce mediator that the wife of his race car driver client is also looking for a detective. He suggests Higgins, even though it pits them on opposite sides of the case. The two decide to have a fun competition, but the fun ends quickly. Meanwhile, Rick opens the bar for the morning and finds a man dead of a heart attack. As the man has no I.D. on him, Rick's only clue is that a waitress overheard the man say something about "Suzy" during last call. As the episode closes, Higgins tells Magnum that she doesn't want to go through with a green card marriage, to TC or anyone.
40	20	"A Leopard on the Prowl"	Bryan Spicer	Eric Guggenheim & Peter M. Lenkov	May 8, 2020	MPI220	6.09
Rick thinks he's talked Icepick out of one last score with a guy he knew in prison, but Icepick goes through with it and is shot by his partner, who also shoots and kills a security guard. Magnum, Higgins and TC all rally to find the murderer, who is determined to eliminate all loose ends. Meanwhile, Magnum learns from Hawaii Five-0 contact Adam Noshimuri of a legal "Hail Mary" that could resolve Higgins' visa situation, but it's very expensive. He decides to call Robin Masters for help.

=== Crossovers ===
Prior to the first season's airing, executive producer, co-showrunner, and co-developer Peter M. Lenkov stated that he had plans for a major two-part crossover event between Magnum P.I and fellow reboot Hawaii Five-0 (for which he was also developer, executive producer, and showrunner). A full crossover event did not occur during the first season, although series regulars from Hawaii Five-0 appeared throughout the season. On September 9, 2019, TVLine reported via an interview with Lenkov that a story for the crossover had been developed and that he intended on making it happen sooner than later. It was later reported that the two-part crossover would air on January 3, 2020. The crossover event featured Magnum P.I. actors Hernandez, Weeks, Knighton, and Hill appearing in the Hawaii Five-0 episode while Hawaii Five-0 actors Meaghan Rath, Katrina Law, and Beulah Koale appeared in the Magnum P.I. episode. Knighton also appeared in a second episode later on in the tenth season of Hawaii Five-0. In addition, other Hawaii Five-0 actors made appearances throughout the entire season.

== Production ==
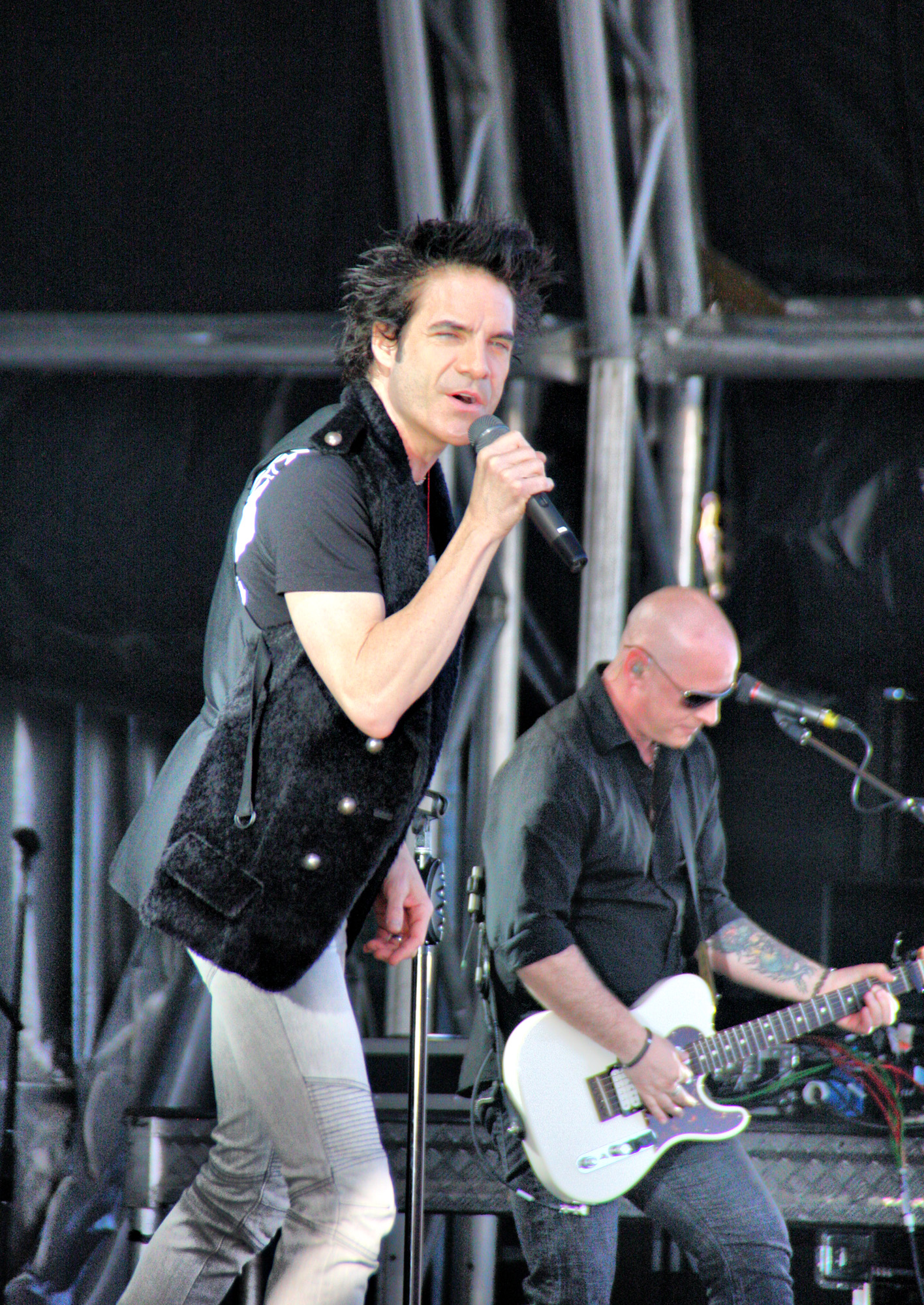
Patrick Monahan, part of the band Train, appeared in the season when the band exclusively premiered a song.

=== Development ===
On January 25, 2019, Magnum P.I. was renewed for a second season along with other CBS freshman series FBI and The Neighborhood. Peter M. Lenkov returned to the series as executive producer and co-showrunner after signing a three-year deal with CBS Television Studios in 2018. Eric Guggenheim also returned as executive producer and co-showrunner. On the November 15, 2019, episode, "He Came by Night," the band Train with artist Skyler Grey made the first public performance of their new song "Mai Tais" on the series. It was later revealed that the season would consist of twenty-episodes. On May 8, 2020, Magnum P.I. was renewed for a third season which premiered on December 4, 2020, after being delayed due to the COVID-19 pandemic. On July 7, 2020, after the season concluded, it was announced that this would be the final season for Lenkov in his role after he was fired with a year left in his contract due to allegations over creating a toxic work environment.

=== Filming ===
Filming for the season began with a traditional Hawaiian blessing on July 8, 2019. A new filming location in the season is the La Mariana Restaurant, an operating Tiki Bar in Hawaii. "Desperate Measures," the second half of the crossover with Hawaii Five-0 filmed in mid-November 2019.

=== Casting ===
Christopher Thornton, who recurred in the first season, continued to recur throughout the season. Bobby Lee was introduced as a new character in the season and also recurred. Brooke Lyons returned for two episodes this season as Abby Miller, Magnum's love interest, after guest starring in an episode of the first season. Lyons was subsequently written out after being cast in another series. Corbin Bernsen who also guest starred in the first season and returned for two episodes. Numerous professional athletes appeared in guest roles throughout the season including Deontay Wilder, a World Boxing Council heavyweight champion, Aaron Donald and Andre Reed, National Football League players, Hans Hedemann, a competitive surfer, and Cowboy Cerrone, an Ultimate Fighting Championship mixed martial artist. Patrick Monahan, Skyler Grey, Jerry Becker, and Luis Carlos Maldonado appeared as themselves and performed as their real world band Train. Stephanie Lum, a Hawaii News Now anchor, also appeared as herself. Roy Yamaguchi, an American-Japanese chef guest starred as himself. Betsy Phillips, series star Zachary Knighton's wife, appeared in the seasons final episode. Hawaii Five-0 series regulars Kimee Balmilero and Taylor Wily recurred throughout the season as their Hawaii Five-0 characters medical examiner Dr. Noelani Cunha and entrepreneur Kamekona Tupuola. Meaghan Rath, Katrina Law, Beulah Koale, Dennis Chun, and Ian Anthony Dale also Hawaii Five-0 series regulars made guest appearances in the season as their Hawaii Five-0 characters. In addition, other Hawaii Five-0 guest stars including Larry Manetti, William Forsythe, Shawn Mokuahi Garnett, Willie Garson all appeared as their characters as well. Both Chun and Manetti previously starred on the original Magnum, P.I..

== Release ==
When CBS revealed its fall schedule for the 2019–2020 broadcast season it was revealed that Magnum P.I. would feature a timeslot change for the season moving from Monday's to Friday's at 9 PM ET. In August 2019, it was announced that the first episode of the season would have an advanced premiere screening along with the premiere of the tenth season of Hawaii Five-0. The annual event known as "Sunset on the Beach" took place on September 18, 2019, and featured a performance form the band Train. It was later reported that the season would premiere on September 27, 2019. In January 2020 it was announced that the season would be split into two parts, with the first part concluding with episode fourteen on January 31, 2020, to allow MacGyver to enter the television schedule as a mid-season replacement. Following the timeslot being freed up by the Hawaii Five-0 series finale, the season continued airing its remaining six episodes on April 10, 2020. The final two episodes of the season aired back-to-back on May 8, 2020, with the series holding the 10 PM ET timeslot as well and concluding with a total of twenty episodes. In Canada, CTV aired the series in simulcast with CBS. Meanwhile, in the United Kingdom, the season began airing on Sky One on December 29, 2019, while the second part began airing on April 19, 2020.

== Ratings ==
Viewership and ratings per episode of Magnum P.I. (2018 TV series) season 2
No.	Title	Air date	Timeslot (ET)	Rating/share (18–49)	Viewers (millions)	DVR (18–49)	DVR viewers (millions)	Total (18–49)	Total viewers (millions)
1	"Payback is for Beginners"	September 27, 2019	Friday; 9:00 p.m.	0.6/3	6.40	0.5	2.54	1.1	8.91
2	"Honor Among Thieves"	October 4, 2019	Friday; 9:00 p.m.	0.6/3	6.09	0.4	2.35	1.0	8.44
3	"Knight Lasts Forever"	October 11, 2019	Friday; 9:00 p.m.	0.6/3	6.43	0.4	2.13	1.0	8.56
4	"Dead Inside"	October 18, 2019	Friday; 9:00 p.m.	0.5/3	5.79	0.4	2.23	1.0	8.02
5	"Make It 'Til Dawn"	October 25, 2019	Friday; 9:00 p.m.	0.6/3	5.97	0.4	2.23	1.0	8.18
6	"Lie, Cheat, Steal, Kill"	November 1, 2019	Friday; 9:00 p.m.	0.6/4	6.42	0.4	2.14	1.0	8.56
7	"The Man in the Secret Room"	November 8, 2019	Friday; 9:00 p.m.	0.6/4	6.69	0.4	2.25	1.0	8.94
8	"He Came by Night"	November 15, 2019	Friday; 9:00 p.m.	0.6/3	6.55	0.4	2.17	1.0	8.73
9	"A Bullet Named Fate"	November 22, 2019	Friday; 9:00 p.m.	0.7/4	6.72	0.4	2.25	1.1	8.98
10	"Blood Brothers"	December 6, 2019	Friday; 9:00 p.m.	0.6/4	6.33	0.4	2.04	1.0	8.37
11	"Day I Met the Devil"	December 13, 2019	Friday; 9:00 p.m.	0.6/4	6.12	0.4	2.22	1.0	8.34
12	"Desperate Measures"	January 3, 2020	Friday; 9:00 p.m.	0.8/5	7.83	0.5	2.55	1.3	10.38
13	"Mondays Are For Murder"	January 10, 2020	Friday; 9:00 p.m.	0.7/4	7.04	0.3	2.19	1.0	9.23
14	"A Game of Cat and Mouse"	January 31, 2020	Friday; 9:00 p.m.	0.7	7.05	0.4	2.35	1.1	9.40
15	"Say Hello to Your Past"	April 10, 2020	Friday; 9:00 p.m.	0.7	7.40	0.3	2.02	1.0	9.43
16	"Farewell to Love"	April 17, 2020	Friday; 9:00 p.m.	0.7	7.14	0.3	2.16	1.0	9.30
17	"The Night Has Eyes"	April 24, 2020	Friday; 9:00 p.m.	0.8	7.20	0.3	2.23	1.1	9.43
18	"A World of Trouble"	May 1, 2020	Friday; 9:00 p.m.	0.7	7.21	0.3	2.01	1.0	9.22
19	"May The Best One Win"	May 8, 2020	Friday; 9:00 p.m.	0.7	6.87	0.3	2.03	0.9	8.91
20	"A Leopard on the Prowl"	May 8, 2020	Friday; 10:00 p.m.	0.6	6.09	0.3	2.26	1.2	8.34

== Home media ==
Magnum P.I.: Season Two
Set details	Special features	
20 episodes; 5-disc set; Subtitles: English	Hawaii Five-0 crossover episode; Deleted scenes on select episodes; Gag reel; Stephen Hill's video diary; "Better Together: The Story of Magnum P.I. Season 2"	
DVD release dates
Region 1	Region 2	Region 4
September 1, 2020	TBA	N/a
Blu-ray release dates
Region A		Region B
TBA		TBA
