= Magnum, P.I. (disambiguation) =

Magnum, P.I. is a 1980 American crime drama.

Magnum, P.I. may also refer to:

- Magnum P.I. (2018 TV series), a 2018 remake of the 1980 series
- Thomas Magnum, the lead character of both series
