= Grace Park =

Grace Park may refer to:

People

- Grace Park (actress) (born 1974), American-born Canadian actress of Korean descent
- Grace Park (golfer) (born 1979), South Korean professional golfer
- Grace Park (violinist), an American violinist.

Fictional characters

- Grace Park, a fictional NBC page portrayed by Charlyne Yi in the 30 Rock episode, "The C Word"

Places

- Grace Park Estate, a subdivision of the Grace Park House in Hawthorn, Melbourne, Victoria, Australia
