= Krishna Rao (director) =

American film director

- Occupation(s): Film/television director, cinematographer
- Years active: 1978–present

Krishna Rao is an American film, television director and cinematographer.

As a director, he has directed episodes of Dawson's Creek, Angel, The Pretender, The Chronicle, She Spies, The Unit, 90210 also working as a cinematographer on three of the latter series. In 1997, his first directorial credit was the sci-fi film Crossworlds.

Rao has also worked as a camera operator on number of notable films namely, Halloween (1978), The Fog (1980) (both directed by John Carpenter), Bachelor Party (1984), Predator 2 (1990), Ricochet (1991) and Star Trek Generations (1994).
