= Eric Guggenheim =

American screenwriter (born 1973)

- Born: October 22, 1973 (age 52); Long Island, New York, United States
- Occupations: Writer, producer, screenwriter
- Years active: 1973–present
- Notable work: Hawaii Five-0; Magnum P.I.
- Family: Marc Guggenheim (brother); David Guggenheim (brother)

Eric Guggenheim (born October 22, 1973) is an American screenwriter. He graduated from NYU's Tisch School of the Arts in 1995. Two years later he sold a script, Trim, to Fox 2000 at age 23. Following that, he wrote an unproduced drama for Warner Bros. and a one-hour drama pilot for USA Network. In 2004, Guggenheim wrote the feature film Miracle. Guggenheim is currently a writer, executive producer and co-showrunner of the CBS series Hawaii Five-0 and Magnum P.I., he was announced as the sole showrunner of Magnum P.I. after co-creator Peter Lenkov was fired by CBS. Before that he spent four seasons as a writer on the NBC series Parenthood. His brothers are screenwriters Marc Guggenheim and David Guggenheim. His family is Jewish.
