= Perdita Weeks =

Welsh actress

- Born: Perdita Rose Weeks; 25 December 1985 (age 40); Cardiff, Wales, UK
- Occupation: Actress
- Years active: 1992–present
- Relatives: Honeysuckle Weeks (sister); Rollo Weeks (brother)

Perdita Rose Weeks (born 25 December 1985) is a British actress who played Juliet Higgins in the CBS/NBC reboot series Magnum P.I.

== Life and education ==
Weeks was born in South Glamorgan to Robin and Susan (née Wade) Weeks, was raised in the English countryside, educated at Roedean School in East Sussex, and studied art history at the Courtauld Institute in London. She is the younger sister of Honeysuckle Weeks and the elder sister of Rollo Weeks, both actors.

== Acting career ==
Weeks portrayed Mary Boleyn in the Showtime historical drama The Tudors (2007–08). In 2008 she appeared as Lydia Bennet in the ITV series Lost in Austen. She played a murdering teen in the "Death and Dreams" episode of Midsomer Murders in 2003.

Weeks has worked on productions such as Stig of the Dump (2002), Sherlock Holmes and the Case of the Silk Stocking (2004), and Miss Potter (2006) and played the role of Kitten in the episode "Counter Culture Blues" of Lewis in 2009. In 2007 she appeared in the radio comedy Bleak Expectations, and in 2011 Weeks appeared in the TV miniseries The Promise.

Weeks co-starred, in an uncredited role, with her sister Honeysuckle in Episode 3 of Goggle Eyes (1993), and in Catherine Cookson's The Rag Nymph (1997): in the latter production she played the younger version of her sister's character. She also stars in the 2010 horror film Prowl, and the 2014 found footage horror film As Above, So Below.

In 2018, Weeks began starring as Juliet Higgins in the CBS reboot of Magnum P.I., filming in Hawaii. After four seasons, the series was picked up by NBC in 2022, with Weeks confirmed to continue in the role. The series ended in January 2024 after five seasons and 96 episodes.

== Filmography ==
Year	Title	Role	Notes
1993	Goggle-Eyes	Uncredited	TV mini-series; episode 3
1995	Loving	Moira	TV film
1995	The Shadowy Third	Dottie	TV film
1996	The Cold Light of Day	Anna Tatour	
1996	Robert Rylands' Last Journey	Sue	
1996	Hamlet	Second Player	
1997	Rag Nymph	Young Millie	2 episodes: "Episode 1.1", "Episode 1.2"
1997	Spice World	Evie	
2000	The Prince and the Pauper	Lady Jane Grey	
2002	Stig of the Dump	Lou	TV series
2003	Midsomer Murders	Hannah Moore	1 episode: "Death and Dreams"
2004	Sherlock Holmes and the Case of the Silk Stocking	Roberta Massingham	TV film
2007–2008	The Tudors	Mary Boleyn	Recurring role
2008	Lost in Austen	Lydia Bennet	TV mini-series
2009–2009	Four Seasons	Imogen Combe	TV mini-series
2009	Junction		Short
2009	Lewis	Kitten	1 episode: "Counter Culture Blues"
2010	Prowl	Fiona	
2010–2011	The Promise	Eliza Meyer	TV mini-series
2011	Great Expectations	Clara Pocket	TV mini-series
2012	Titanic	Lady Georgiana Grex	TV mini-series
2013	Flight of the Storks	Sarah Gabbor	TV mini-series
2013	The Invisible Woman	Maria Ternan	Feature film
2014	As Above, So Below	Scarlett Marlowe	Feature film
2014	The Great Fire	Elizabeth Pepys	TV mini-series
2015	The Musketeers	Louise	1 episode: "A Marriage of Inconvenience"
2016	Rebellion	Vanessa Hammond	TV mini-series
2016	Penny Dreadful	Catriona Hartdegen	TV series
2018	Ready Player One	Kira	Feature film
2018–2024	Magnum P.I.	Juliet Higgins	TV series; main role (96 episodes)
2019	Du Lac & Fey: Dance of Death	Morgan le Fay (voice)	Video game
2020	Hawaii Five-0	Juliet Higgins	TV series; 1 episode
2025	Fountain of Youth	Harold's Lawyer	Short appearance
2025	The Gold	Tina Keyes	TV series; episodes 2.4, 2.5
2026	The Face of Horror	Lady Mortimer	Feature film
