= Eagle Egilsson =

Television director, cinematographer

- Born: Egill Örn Egilsson; 31 August 1966 (age 59); Reykjavík, Iceland
- Occupations: Television director; cinematographer
- Years active: 1993–present

Egill Örn "Eagle" Egilsson (Note: He is known in the English-speaking world by the nickname "Eagle", a direct translation of his middle name "Örn". Despite visual similarities, the name "Eagle" is unrelated to his forename "Egill".) ([ˈeiːjɪtl œrtn ˈeiːjɪlson]; /ˈiːɡəl ˈeɪ.əlsən/ EE-gəl AY-əl-sən; born 31 August 1966) is an Icelandic television director and cinematographer.

== Life and career ==
Egill Örn Egilsson was born in Reykjavík on 31 August 1966 and studied filmmaking at Columbia College Hollywood in Los Angeles. As a cinematographer, he is perhaps best known for his work on The Wire, CSI: Miami (also a co-producer), Dark Blue (also a director), and numerous television commercials and music videos. In 2008, he directed the Heroes spin-off miniseries Heroes: Destiny. Since 2011, he has mostly worked as a director. He directed numerous episodes of Nikita, including the finale, and episodes of Fringe, Alcatraz, and Gotham. He was also a frequent director on the fourth, fifth, and sixth seasons of CSI: Miami, and has directed several episodes of the original CSI series.

For his cinematography, Egill has been nominated for four American Society of Cinematographers Outstanding Achievement Awards, winning in the television category in 2010 for the Dark Blue episode "Venice Kings", which he also directed. Later that year, at the age of 44, he became the first Icelander to join the American Society of Cinematographers.
