= Thomas Magnum =

Fictional character on American television series Magnum, P.I.

- Magnum, P.I. character
- First appearance: "Don't Eat the Snow in Hawaii" (1980)
- Last appearance: "Resolutions" (1988)
- Created by: Donald P. Bellisario; Glen A. Larson
- Portrayed by: Tom Selleck (original)

In-universe information
- Occupation: Former Navy SEAL; Naval Intelligence; Private Investigator; Robin Master's White Knight (books and tapes)
- Family: Thomas Sullivan Magnum III (father); Katherine Magnum-Peterson, née Courier (mother); Thomas Sullivan Magnum Jr. (grandfather); Everett Wendell Courier (grandfather)
- Spouse: Michelle Hue (former)
- Children: Lily Catherine Hue (daughter)
- Relatives: Phoebe Sullivan (aunt); Frank Peterson (stepfather); Joey Peterson (half-brother)

Thomas Magnum is the main character on the American television series Magnum, P.I. created by Donald P. Bellisario and Glen A. Larson. The titular private investigator was originally portrayed by actor Tom Selleck from 1980 to 1988, and later by Jay Hernandez in a reboot developed by Peter M. Lenkov.

== Magnum, P.I. (1980–1988) ==
Magnum is a former naval officer, turned private investigator and "beach bum" in Hawaii.

Despite irregular employment, he manages to secure a cushy job and live a comfortable existence as a security expert on the estate of celebrity author Robin Masters. The job perks included use of the guest house on Masters' Hawaii estate "Robin's Nest" and his red Ferrari 308 GTS in exchange for looking after the estate security. This often puts him in conflict with the estate's more responsible and serious majordomo, Higgins.

In the course of the series, Magnum and his friends (former Vietnam comrades, Rick Wright and T.C. Calvin) become involved, not only in typical private investigator cases, but also a wide variety of adventures involving espionage, covert operations, paramilitary escapades, and "lifestyles of the rich and famous".

Often appearing in khaki pleated shorts or blue jeans, an Aloha shirt, Sperry boat shoes or white Puma Easy Rider Sneakers, ankle socks, and a battered baseball cap, Magnum was originally envisioned as a James Bond type character but, at Selleck's request, was made into more of an average "everyman" with numerous character flaws.

== Character ==
=== Early life ===
Thomas Sullivan Magnum IV is around forty years old during the original series, although a variety of birthdates are given in at least 5 episodes, ranging from August 1944 to February 1947.

Magnum was born in Detroit but raised in the Tidewater region of Virginia. Both his father and grandfather were naval officers.

Magnum's father was a Naval Aviator killed in the Korean War when Magnum was only five. In the show, one of Magnum's most valued possessions is his father's Rolex GMT Master aviator's wristwatch. After Magnum's father's death, his mother Katherine married Frank Peterson. They had a son Joey, who died while serving in Vietnam.

Magnum also has an aunt, Phoebe Sullivan, a novelist, and a cousin named Karen.

=== United States Navy career ===
Magnum attended the United States Naval Academy, in the class of '67 or '68, depending on the episode referenced. While at the Naval Academy, he dated Ginger Grant who became a professional tennis player and re-entered his life in the episode "Mixed Doubles".

In the episode, "From Moscow to Maui", Magnum states that he was the captain of the Annapolis football team during at least one Army–Navy game with Navy scoring a touchdown early in the first quarter from a play he called.

Magnum served in the Navy for ten or more years as an officer, rising to the rank of lieutenant commander before resigning in disillusionment in 1979. Magnum was a Vietnam War veteran and a former POW. He served in both the SEALs and Naval Intelligence during his Navy years. In the episode "Solo Flight", he is seen wearing the rank insignia for a lieutenant commander. In the episode Memories are Forever part 1, Magnum is promoted to full Commander, as part of being reinstated by Buck Green. In the final episode of Magnum P.I. in 1988, Thomas decides to return to active duty in the Navy at the rank of commander (O-5).

==== Military decorations and awards ====
On his Navy uniform, Magnum wears service ribbons for the Navy Cross, Purple Heart, National Defense Service Medal, Vietnam Service Medal, Gallantry Cross Unit Citation with Palm and Frame, and the Republic of Vietnam Campaign Medal.

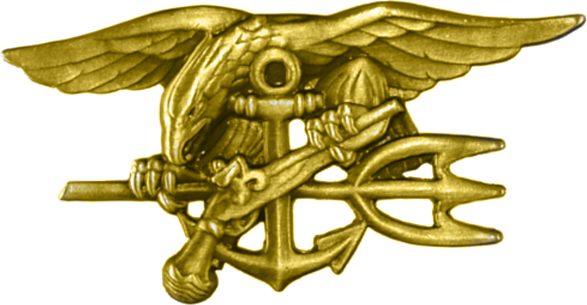

In the season 2 episodes 23/24, "Memories are Forever" parts 1 & 2 Magnum's uniform is with the collar of a commander, the Special Warfare insignia with the Navy Cross, Purple Heart, National Defense Service Medal, Vietnam Service Medal with 2 service star, Gallantry Cross Unit Citation with Palm and Frame and the Republic of Vietnam Campaign Medal.

=== Friendships ===
The theme of friendship run through many episodes of the show.

Magnum's most enduring friendships were with his former Vietnam comrades, Orville Wilbur Richard "Rick" Wright and Theodore "T.C." Calvin.

His also develops a love-hate relationship with Jonathan Quayle Higgins III, the majordomo of the estate where Magnum was a perennial guest or "moocher". Magnum persistently tries to foil Higgins' efforts to impose an orderly regimen on Magnum's disordered lifestyle, as they trade verbal jabs and one-upmanship games with each other.

Magnum lives in the guest house on Robin Masters' estate, Robin's Nest, as part of his being in-charge of security on the estate.

Magnum enjoys sneaking fine wines out of Robin Masters's wine cellar when he believes Higgins is not looking. He has free use of Masters' Ferrari 308 GTS, and he often barters with Higgins for the use of expensive cameras, the tennis courts, and other accoutrements of wealthy living.

Other friendships were woven throughout the series.

Magnum continuously took advantage of Lieutenant "Mac" MacReynolds, a Navy officer and intelligence source for many of his cases, but was devastated when Mac was killed in an assassination attempt on Magnum by "Ivan," a Soviet intelligence operative who had also overseen the torture of Magnum when he was a POW in Vietnam.

For almost every season in the series, Magnum's investigations paralleled and sometimes crossed over with those of Honolulu Police Lieutenant Tanaka.

Magnum also maintained friendships with Assistant District Attorney Carol Baldwin and Lieutenant Maggie Poole, MacReynolds' successor. Magnum was no less apt to exploit his friendship with Carol or Maggie as he was his male friends, and no less loyal.

Numerous episode plots featured "old friends" calling on Magnum for help, requests he always honored, even when helping conflicted with his best judgment.

=== Wife and child ===
While serving in South Vietnam, Magnum married a French-Eurasian nurse named Michelle Hue, the presumed widow of North Vietnamese General Nguyen Hue.

Magnum left Vietnam believing Michelle was killed during the 1975 evacuation of Saigon. However, her death was staged presumably because General Hue had resurfaced and Michelle knew Magnum wouldn't leave Vietnam without her.

In the episode "Memories Are Forever" (November 1981), Magnum was reunited with his wife and learned the truth behind her deception. Unbeknownst to Magnum, at the time, they had conceived a daughter, Lily Catherine. Lily Catherine appeared in five episodes of the show ("Little Girl Who", "Limbo", "Infinity and Jelly doughnuts", "Unfinished Business", and "Resolutions").

General Hue, Michelle, and Michelle's second husband, Edward Durant are killed by Hue's enemies who presume that Lily Catherine is also dead. Following her reunion with Magnum, he later returns to his career as a Naval Intelligence officer in a bid to protect her.

== Magnum P.I. (2018–2024) ==
Thomas Magnum
- Magnum P.I. character
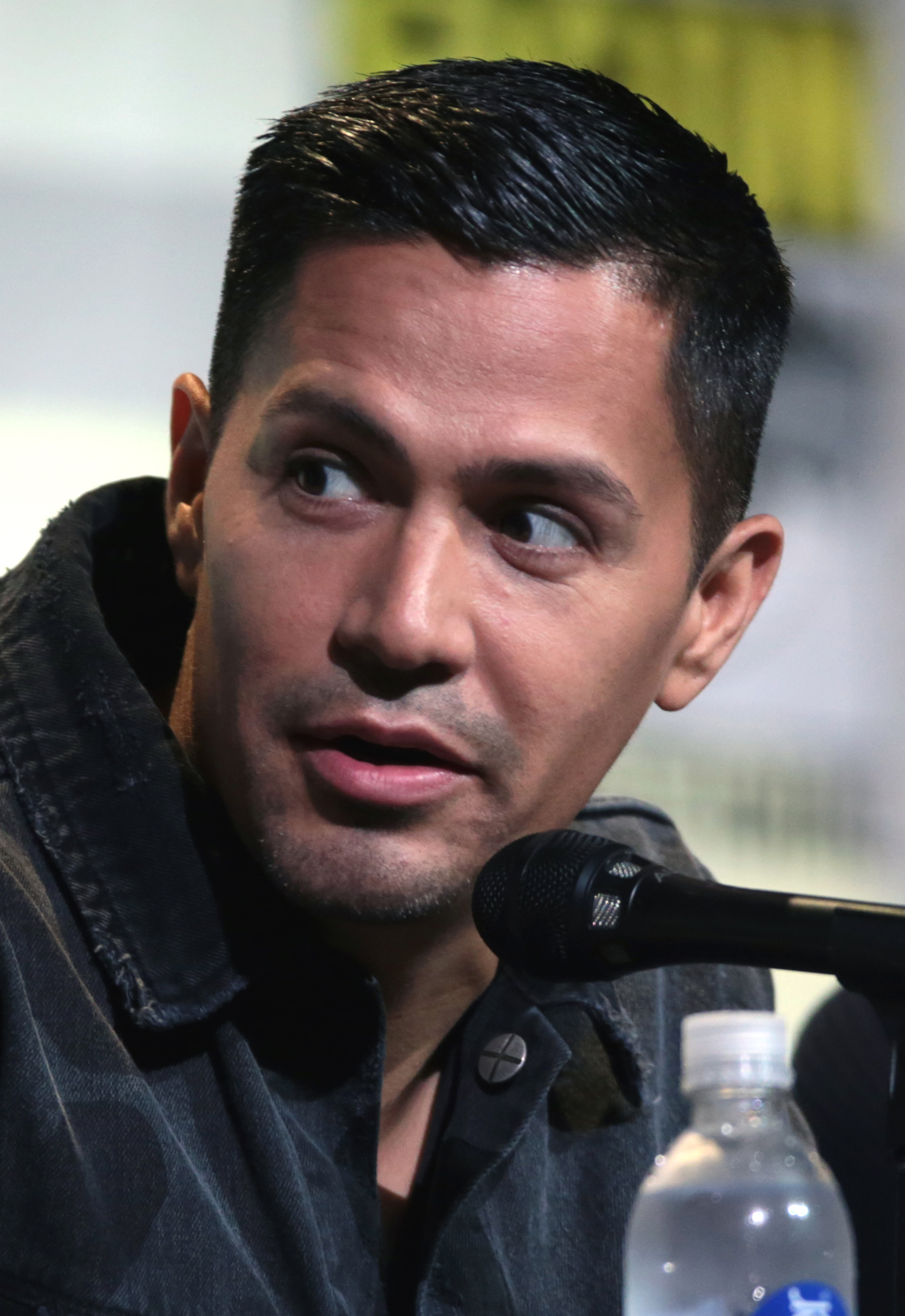
- Jay Hernandez portrays Thomas Magnum in the reboot
- First appearance: "I Saw the Sun Rise"
- Last appearance: "The Big Squeeze"
- Created by: Donald P. Bellisario; Glen A. Larson
- Portrayed by: Jay Hernandez
- Developed by: Peter M. Lenkov
- Other appearances: Hawaii Five-0 ("Ihea 'oe i ka wa a ka ua e loku ana?")

In-universe information
- Full name: Thomas Sullivan Magnum
- Occupation: Navy SEAL; Private Investigator
- Family: Thomas Sullivan Magnum (father); Catarina Magnum, née Hall (mother)
- Relatives: Bernardo Hall (uncle)
- Nationality: American

Jay Hernandez portrays Thomas Magnum in the 2018 reboot of the series.

In the new series, Thomas Magnum is a decorated ex-Navy SEAL who returns home from Afghanistan, where he spent time as a prisoner of war, to become a private investigator. He gets help on cases from his two old friends, former Marines Theodore "TC" Calvin and Orville "Rick" Wright, and from former MI6 agent Juliet Higgins.

In season two, Higgins becomes Magnum's partner. Later in the season, Magnum asks Higgins to marry him in order for her to stay in the country after her visa expires. She initially accepts his offer but later reverses her decision.

Hernandez also played Magnum in a crossover episode with Hawaii Five-0.

=== Military decorations and awards ===
On his U.S. Navy uniform, Magnum wears the following medals and naval insignia in the 2018 reboot series:

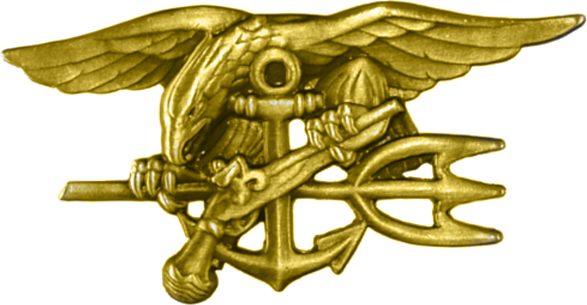

Special Warfare insignia
Navy Cross	Bronze Star with "V" device	Navy and Marine Corps Commendation Medal
Navy and Marine Corps Achievement Medal with 1 5/16 inch stars	Combat Action Ribbon	Navy Unit Commendation
Navy Meritorious Unit Commendation	Navy Good Conduct Medal	National Defense Service Medal
Armed Forces Expeditionary Medal	Afghanistan Campaign Medal with 3 Service Stars	Iraq Campaign Medal with 2 Service Stars
Global War on Terrorism Expeditionary Medal	Global War on Terrorism Service Medal	Navy and Marine Corps Sea Service Deployment Ribbon with 3 Service Stars
Overseas Service Ribbon with 2 Service Stars	Rifle Marksmanship Medal with Expert Device	Pistol Marksmanship Medal with Expert Device
Navy and Marine Corps Parachutist Badge
