= Oia'i'o =

- Hawaii Five-0 episode
- Chin Ho Kelly (right) placing Steve McGarrett (middle) under arrest for murder of Governor Jameson (left)
- Episode no.: Season 1 Episode 24
- Directed by: Brad Turner
- Written by: Peter M. Lenkov & Paul Zbyszewski
- Cinematography by: Ron Garcia
- Editing by: Scott Powell
- Production code: 124
- Original air date: May 16, 2011
- Running time: 44 minutes

Guest appearances
- Mark Dacascos as Wo Fat; Claire van der Boom as Rachel Edwards; Teilor Grubbs as Grace Williams; Taylor Wily as Kamekona; Larisa Oleynik as Jenna Kaye; Jean Smart as Governor Pat Jameson; Kelly Hu as Laura Hills; Brian Yang as Charlie Fong; Val Lauren as Dale O'Reilly; Shane Seggar as Sgt. Gary O'Reilly; Kelvin Han Yee as Chief Mahaka; Garret T. Sato as Detective Ahuna; Dennis Chun as Sgt. Duke Lukela

Episode chronology
← Previous "Ua Hiki Mai Kapalena Pau"	Next → "Haʻiʻole"
- Hawaii Five-0 (2010 TV series, season 1)

"Oia'i'o" (Hawaiian, 'Trust') is the twenty-fourth episode of the first season of Hawaii Five-0. It also serves as the first season finale and aired on May 16, 2011 on CBS. The episode was written by Peter M. Lenkov & Paul Zbyszewski and was directed by Brad Turner. In the episode the Five-0 Task Force attempts to hunt down Wo Fat while keeping the group together.

== Plot ==
Chin is offered a job at the Honolulu Police Department. Steve receives another envelope with a missing piece from his fathers "Champ" toolbox, which contains a key. Following a meeting at the 'Iolani Palace, Laura starts her car which explodes, killing her.

The Five-0 Task Force investigates the explosion and finds remnants of a claymore mine. Jenna recognizes it as work of Wo Fat. Charlie Fong matches a writing sample on the envelopes to Laura's. Jenna finds out that a shipment of military supplies containing claymore's were stolen and that the main suspect was Dale O'Riley. Steve and Danny visit Dale, who claims that he sold the mine to Steve McGarrett.

Chin tells Steve, Danny, and Jenna that when HPD processed Laura's house Steve's fingerprints were found inside. Dale is offered a deal, and is offered leniency in exchange for testimony that he actually sold the mine to Wo Fat. Steve recognizes an antique in the Governor's office which he believes the key will fit. Steve is told that Dale had been murdered during transport to prison. Steve comes up with a plan to break into the Governor's mansion and when he does he finds more items from the toolbox along with photos of Laura delivering envelopes to him. Rachel tells Danny that she is pregnant with his child and wants to move back to the mainland.

Steve shares his findings with Danny and the two deduce that the Governor had Laura killed for helping Steve. Chin is informed that an arrest warrant has been issued for Steve for the murder of Laura. HPD arrives to arrest him but he escapes. Steve visits Kamekona acquiring weapons from him. Meanwhile, an internal affairs officer brings Kono in on suspicion of stealing money from the HPD asset forfeiture locker. Steve breaks into the Governor's mansion for a second time, holds her at gunpoint, and gets the Governor to confess to putting out the murder hit for his father, mother, and Laura. Wo Fat tasers Steve from behind, causing him to pass out. Wo Fat shoots and kills the Governor and places the gun in Steve's hand. Chin, who accepted the position his job back at HPD, arrests Steve.

A witness recognizes Kono as the one who stole from the forfeiture locker. Kono is forced to turn in her gun and badge pending investigation while Steve is being processed for jail.

== Production ==
It's sort of our all-star episode because everybody who started with us is coming back

— Peter M. Lenkov

=== Casting ===
A large number of supporting actors who had previously portrayed recurring and guest characters from the season reprised their roles including Mark Dacascos, Claire van der Boom, Teilor Grubbs, Taylor Wily, Larisa Oleynik, Jean Smart, Kelly Hu, Brian Yang, and Dennis Chun. The episode marked the final appearances of actors Jean Smart and Kelly Hu who portrayed recurring characters Governor Pat Jameson and Laura Hills respectively who were both killed off.

=== Filming ===
Filming for the episode began on April 8 and concluded on April 15 of 2011. Producers kept pieces of the script hidden until filming to keep certain aspects of the story confidential.

=== Promotion ===
The press release for the episode occurred on April 21, 2011. The teaser trailer aired immediately following the previous episode on May 9.

== Reception ==
=== Cast and crew interviews ===
Lead actor Alex O'Loughlin stated "I think it is always really important to bring it home, but this one is a clincher [...]" while executive producer and showrunner, Peter M. Lenkov stated "The fact that you can survive, 24 episodes later, is pretty significant."

=== Viewing figures ===
The episode aired on September 28, 2018 and was watched live and same day by 10.41 million viewers. It ranked as the fifteenth most viewed series for the week of May 16–22, 2011. Within seven days, by means of DVR and video on demand services the total number of viewers rose to 13.61 million.

=== Critical response ===
Reviews toward the episode were mostly positive. TV Fanatic gave the episode an editorial rating of 4.7 out of 5 saying "Overall, there were a lot of thrilling and unexpected moments, but there were some things that were slightly predictable.".

== Broadcast, streaming, and home video release ==
The episode was released on DVD and Blu-ray along with the other season 1 episodes in a 6-disc box set including deleted scenes and other special features. It was released in region one on September 20, 2011 and in region two on September 26. It can also be viewed on demand with a CBS All Access subscription as well as Netflix. The episode can be individually purchased, or with the season as a whole, on Amazon, iTunes and Vudu.

== See also ==
- List of Hawaii Five-0 (2010 TV series) episodes
- Hawaii Five-0 (2010 TV series) season 1
