= Kai eʻe =

- Hawaii Five-0 episode
- Episode no.: Season 1 Episode 15
- Directed by: Duane Clark
- Written by: Melissa Glenn & Jessica Rieder
- Production code: 115
- Original air date: January 23, 2011

Guest appearances
- Joel David Moore as Deputy Director Sheldon Tunney; Brian Goodman as Commander Sam Hale; Joanna Levesque as Courtney Russell; John Sullivan as Dr. Norman Russell; Agnes Bruckner as Tanya; Tamayo Perry as Spike/Harrison Dunphy; Dennis Chun as Sgt. Duke Lukela; Melissa Puana-Martin as Governor's Assistant; Al Harrington as Mamo

Episode chronology
← Previous "He Kane Hewaʻole"	Next → "E Malama"
- Hawaii Five-0 (2010 TV series, season 1)

"Kai eʻe" (Hawaiian for: "Tidal Wave") is the fifteenth episode of the first season of Hawaii Five-0. It aired on January 23, 2011 on CBS. The episode was written by Melissa Glenn and Jessica Rieder, and directed by Duane Clark. The episode holds the record for the most watched Hawaii Five-0 episode in the series history with 19.34 million viewers.

== Plot ==
Life for citizens on the island of Hawaii takes a turn when a tsunami warning alert is sounded, forcing everyone to evacuate. During this, the team investigates the disappearance of Dr. Norman Russell, the head of the Tsunami Warning Center. Steve later comes to the conclusion that the tsunami was actually a hoax. The team discovers that Sam Hale, a Commander with the Coast Guard, is the one responsible for arranging everything, as Hale was planning on breaking into the empty precinct where the $28 million (first mentioned in "Hana ʻaʻa Makehewa") is held. The team then heads to the precinct and successfully arrest Hale, knowing that their theft of $10 million to save Chin will be noticed when the money is audited. Later, Steve learns from Governor Pat Jameson that all $28 million was recovered, which leaves the team greatly disturbed, because they do not know how the $10 million they stole was returned.

== Production ==
=== Release ===
The episode aired immediately following the 2011 AFC Championship Game.

== Reception ==
=== Viewing figures ===
In the United States the episode was watched live by 19.34 million viewers. The episode put Hawaii Five-0 in the Guinness World Records 2012 for Highest-Rated New Show in the U.S.

=== Critical response ===
An editor review by TV Fanatic said "On one hand, "Kaie'e" was very exciting, surprising me by bringing up potential consequences from the money the Five-O had taken in order to save Chin's life. This required serious suspension of disbelief. I was nearly able to get into that head space, but once McGarrett started to suspect that the tsunami wasn't real, it made it difficult to do so. The hoax seemed too grand a scheme to be pulled off without more people realizing it was a fake. ... Despite the few moments where the slight ridiculousness of the scenario hit me, this was a good episode. I'm looking forward to future developments regarding the reappearing money." He also gave the episode an editorial rating of 4.3 out of 5 stars.

== See also ==
- List of Hawaii Five-0 (2010 TV series) episodes
- Hawaii Five-0 (2010 TV series, season 1)
