= Hawaii Five-0 (2010 TV series) season 1 =

Season of the television series Hawaii Five-0

Hawaii Five-0
- Season 1
- Season 1 U.S. DVD cover
- Showrunner: Peter M. Lenkov
- Starring: Alex O'Loughlin; Scott Caan; Daniel Dae Kim; Grace Park; Taryn Manning
- No. of episodes: 24

Release
- Original network: CBS
- Original release: September 20, 2010 – May 16, 2011

Season chronology
- Next → Season 2

The first season of the police procedural drama series Hawaii Five-0 premiered on CBS on September 20, 2010, for the 2010–11 television season in the United States. Production began for the pilot on February 18, 2010. CBS gave a full series order on May 19, 2010, and later ordered a full 24-episode season on October 21, 2010. The season concluded on May 16, 2011.

The series centers on the "Five-0", a specialized task force established by the Hawaiian Governor that investigates a wide series of crimes on the islands, including murder, terrorism and human trafficking. The series stars Alex O'Loughlin, Scott Caan, Daniel Dae Kim, and Grace Park. Taryn Manning receives an "Also starring" credit for three episodes before departing the series in the thirteenth episode of the season.

The first season ranked number 22 for the 2010–11 United States television season, had an average of 11.96 million viewers, and received mostly positive reviews. "Kai e'e", the fifteenth episode of the season, holds the record for the most watched Hawaii Five-0 episode in the series history with 19.34 million viewers. In addition, the series premiere holds the record for second-most-watched episode with 14.20 million. Hawaii Five-0 received generally positive reviews from critics and became one of CBS' top rated programs. It was renewed for a second season on May 18, 2011, which premiered on September 19, 2011.

== Cast and characters ==
=== Main cast ===
- Alex O'Loughlin as Lieutenant Commander Steven "Steve" McGarrett, United States Navy Reserve
- Scott Caan as Detective Sergeant Daniel "Danny" "Danno" Williams
- Daniel Dae Kim as Detective Lieutenant Chin Ho Kelly
- Grace Park as Officer Kono Kalakaua
- Taryn Manning as Mary Ann McGarrett

=== Recurring ===
- James Marsters as Victor Hesse
- Jean Smart as Governor Pat Jameson
- Teilor Grubbs as Grace Williams
- Taylor Wily as Kamekona Tupuola
- Will Yun Lee as Sang Min Sooh
- Michelle Borth as Lieutenant Catherine Rollins, United States Navy
- Dennis Chun as HPD Sergeant Duke Lukela
- Masi Oka as Dr. Max Bergman, Chief Medical Examiner
- Claire van der Boom as Rachel Edwards
- Mark Dacascos as Wo Fat
- Larisa Oleynik as Jenna Kaye
- Kelly Hu as Laura Hills

=== Guest stars ===
- Norman Reedus as Anton Hesse
- Andrea Bowen as Amy
- Sean "Diddy" Combs as Reggie Cole
- Dane Cook as Matthew Williams
- Selita Ebanks as Lisa
- Patrick Gallagher as Carlos Bagoyo
- Balthazar Getty as Walton Dawkins
- Nasir "Nas" Jones as Gordon Smith
- Nick Lachey as Tyler
- Joanna Levesque as Courtney Russell
- Robert Loggia as Ed McKay
- Vanessa Minnillo as Susan
- Masaharu Morimoto as himself
- William Sadler as John McGarrett
- Jason Scott Lee as Detective Kaleo
- Kevin Sorbo as Carlton Bass
- Rick Springfield as Renny Sinclair
- Peter Stormare as Drago Zankovic
- Cary-Hiroyuki Tagawa as Hiro Noshimuri
- Joshua Dallas as Ben Bass
- Justin David Ross as Swat Guy

== Episodes ==
With the exception of the pilot, the title of each episode is in the Hawaiian language with the English translation directly underneath.

No. overall	No. in season	Title	Directed by	Written by	Original release date	Prod. code	U.S. viewers (millions)
1	1	"Pilot"	Len Wiseman	Story by : Alex Kurtzman & Roberto Orci & Peter M. Lenkov; Teleplay by : Peter M. Lenkov	September 20, 2010	101	14.20
U.S. Navy SEAL Steve McGarrett returns to his native Hawaii to find Victor Hesse, a terrorist who murdered McGarrett's father, John McGarrett, a retired officer from the Honolulu Police Department (HPD). He is enlisted by Hawaiian Governor Pat Jameson to head a new task force with legal immunity to clean up the underworld of Oʻahu. In turn, McGarrett enlists Honolulu newcomer Danny Williams, a divorced detective who moved from New Jersey to be closer to his daughter; Chin Ho Kelly, a disgraced police officer and a protege of McGarrett's father; and Kono Kalakaua, Chin Ho's cousin, a former surfer and soon-to-be Police Academy graduate. Together they discover a link between Hesse and a Chinese human trafficking ring with a mole in HPD. After threatening to deport the family of the ring leader, Sang Min, to Rwanda, McGarrett is given the location where Hesse is, on a freighter heading to China.
2	2	"ʻOhana" "Family"	Brad Turner	Sarah Goldfinger & Paul Zbyszewski	September 27, 2010	103	12.72
A National Security Agency expert in cyberterrorism, Roland Lowery (Scott Cohen), is kidnapped by a Serbian gang. While Kono is tasked with looking after Lowery's son Evan (Colin Ford), the rest of the team discover Lowery was working on a "skeleton key", a computer program that would allow the user to hack into anything. Soon, Kono and Evan are kidnapped by the same gang led by Drago Zankovic (Peter Stormare). The rest of the team realize the gang is using the program to shut down the island's radar, allowing a plane to smuggle through. Zankovic intends to sell the program to the occupants of the plane. In the end, the team celebrate Kono's Police Academy graduation.
3	3	"Malama Ka ʻAina" "Respect the Land"	Paul Edwards	Carol Barbee & Kyle Harimoto	October 4, 2010	102	12.24
The team fall witness to a shooting between Triad and Samoan gangs during a high school football game which they were watching. Chin Ho chases a suspect, only to find it is Sid (Sidney Liufau), his cousin, who later reveals himself to be working undercover in a gang unit. Sid refuses to have anything to do with Chin Ho because of Chin's past with the HPD and also because of the corruption charge that Chin has. McGarrett and Danny discover that Frank Salvo (James Russo), a Mafia boss from New Jersey, is meeting with the head of the Samoan gang, after which there could be a full blown gang war. Meanwhile, Danny fights to keep shared custody of his daughter as she was present at the football game shooting. In the end, the team decides to name themselves "Five-0", after McGarrett's high school football jersey number.
4	4	"Lanakila" "Victory"	Alex Zakrzewski	Peter M. Lenkov & Alex Kurtzman & Roberto Orci	October 11, 2010	105	10.69
Five-0 are tasked to find Walton Dawkins (Balthazar Getty) a convict who broke out of prison. They later find he is targeting a couple, who recently won a million dollars and free trip to Hawaii on a game show. Dawkins kidnaps the boyfriend, Craig Ellers (Kenneth Mitchell), who is revealed to be Dawkins' former partner in crime. The two previously robbed five million dollars before Ellers placed it in a bank while Dawkins goes to prison. Meanwhile, McGarrett reunites with his sister Mary (Taryn Manning) when she comes to visit and asks his on-again, off-again girlfriend Navy Intelligence Officer Catherine Rollins for "a favor" in watching over her. Danny has a knee injury which he jokingly blames on McGarrett's unorthodox tactics for getting the job done. Note: This is the first episode to feature Taryn Manning as a main cast member credited as "also starring"
5	5	"Nalowale" "Forgotten/Missing"	Brad Turner	J. R. Orci & David Wolkove	October 18, 2010	104	10.94
Amanda Reeves, the adult daughter of U.S. Ambassador to the Philippines Michael Reeves, is found drowned. Governor Jameson takes a personal pledge to find those responsible and enlists Five-0. Over the course of the investigation, they learn Amanda's sister Robin is still alive and was last found in a nightclub. McGarrett and Danny discover somebody drugged both sisters and sold them to a sex trafficking ring. They learn from the head of the operation that they were ordered to kidnap the sisters from a Filipino terrorist organization, headed by Carlos Bagoyo (Patrick Gallagher), who is using the ransom demand to get to Reeves and log into a database. Meanwhile, Mary finds her father's tool box that he left for her brother to solve a crime and starts investigating herself. The team meets quirky medical examiner Max Bergman (Masi Oka).
6	6	"Koʻolauloa" "North Shore of Oʻahu"	Matt Earl Beesley	Carol Barbee & Kyle Harimoto	October 25, 2010	106	10.23
Ian Adams (Mark Cunningham), the head of Kono's former pro surfing team, is shot in front of a large crowd. McGarrett suggests Kono sit out the case, but she insists on finding the killer. She talks with old friend Ben Bass (Joshua Dallas), the son of Carlton Bass (Kevin Sorbo) who was Adams's business partner. She learns that he founded a surf village located near the beach where Adams was killed, but local gangsters are trying to get them to leave.
7	7	"Hoʻapono" "Accept"	James Whitmore Jr.	Peter M. Lenkov & Jim Galasso	November 1, 2010	107	10.86
Ex-Navy SEAL Graham Wilson (Adam Beach) is being pursued by HPD, fleeing the scene of his wife's murder, and takes a group of tourists hostage aboard the USS Missouri in Pearl Harbor. He claims to be innocent and forces the authorities to find the real killer. Governor Jameson's new public safety liaison Laura Hills seeks the help of Five-0. McGarrett boards the Missouri while the rest of the team pieces together what actually happened at the crime scene. On-board Missouri, McGarrett's plan is assisted by Ed McKay (Robert Loggia), a retired sailor who had served with McGarrett's grandfather on the USS Arizona during the attack on Pearl Harbor. After Wilson's daughter (Mackenzie Foy) is kidnapped, it seems apparent he was framed, and the team shifts priority to recovering the girl.
8	8	"Manaʻo" "Belief"	Matt Earl Beesley	Paul Zbyszewski & Jim Galasso	November 8, 2010	108	10.23
Danny is shocked to discover his former HPD partner, Meka Hanamoa, is found dead at a lūʻau. Furthermore he learns HPD is not investigating who murdered him because Internal Affairs detective Cage is investigating Hanamoa for possible police corruption, Cage had previously investigated Chin Ho. Hanamoa's most recent partner Kaleo (Jason Scott Lee) works with Five-0 and find Hanamoa may have worked with the Ochoa cartel, led by Emilio Ochoa (Christian George). Although they plan to capture him alive, Kaleo kills him, claiming he was defending himself. McGarrett remembers that Sang Min had a mole in HPD (who identified Kono as a cop in "Pilot",) so they ask Sang Min to identify the mole, who reveals that Kaleo is the mole. Danny beats him, and with Meka cleared, the HPD hold a memorial service.
9	9	"Poʻipu" "The Siege"	Brad Turner	Story by : Peter M. Lenkov & Shane Salerno; Teleplay by : Shane Salerno	November 15, 2010	109	10.34
When a security detail member is found murdered in a hotel room, Five-0 discovers he was assigned to protect General Pak (Ric Young), a mass-murdering military general from Sandimar, who is due at the upcoming Oʻahu Foreign Aid Summit. Working with an old SEAL buddy Nick Taylor (Max Martini), McGarrett and the team discover the murderer is Erica Raines (Emmanuelle Vaugier), a former Central Intelligence Agency (CIA) assassin. When the team confronts her, she attempts to flee but gets hit by a bus and dies. When Pak and his family arrive in Hawaii, Five-0 learns that Taylor was in on a plan to assassinate Pak.
10	10	"Heihei" "Race"	Elodie Keene	Sarah Goldfinger	November 22, 2010	110	12.34
In Waikiki, four masked assailants in white coats rob an armored car shooting all three guards, killing two of them in broad daylight. Five-0 quickly recover the van as well as the money, leaving them confused but realizes the gang is likely to strike a bigger target during a triathlon event, which is being held the next day. Furthermore, the robbers are athletes taking part in the event and are living next door to Danny's ex-wife Rachel (Claire van der Boom).
11	11	"Palekaiko" "Paradise"	Frederick E. O. Toye	David Wolkove & J. R. Orci	December 6, 2010	111	10.51
Five-0 investigate when Erica Harris is found by two hunters, not knowing what she was running from. Erica is on her honeymoon with her husband, Jake Harris. Her mother-in-law suspects her of being involved, having possibly only married Jake for his money and that she is in debt. Jake is found dead in their hotel room, and Max Bergman discovers a series of related murders in 2009 where couples were targeted. Five-0 realize they are dealing with a serial killer who was engaged to a woman that called off the wedding, and Five-0 believe he later killed her. Meanwhile, McGarrett reveals to Chin the Champion Spark Plugs tool box left to him by his father, showing pictures and files about Yakuza activity. There are also a set of unexplained numbers. Chin reveals the numbers were a case file that mysteriously disappeared, involving McGarrett's mother's death.
12	12	"Hana ʻaʻa Makehewa" "Desperate Measures"	Chris Fisher	Story by : Peter M. Lenkov; Teleplay by : Carol Barbee & Kyle Harimoto	December 13, 2010	112	10.91
A weapons dealer wanted by Interpol is found dead after washing ashore. Surveillance shows the victim walking with Victor Hesse, the man who killed McGarrett's father and survived being shot. He visited a doctor whom he later kills after having the bullets removed from his torso, and has been off the grid for four months. To track him down, Five-0 reluctantly enlist the help of Sang Min, the human trafficker arrested from the pilot. When they arrive at the bar, Sang Min betrays them and helps Hesse escape. Chin Ho tracks them to a ship, but is knocked out and awakens the next morning with a bomb attached to his neck. Hesse demands $10 million in exchange for his life. Five-0 is forced to break into the vault and "borrow" the money they need. As Five-0 celebrate Christmas, Hesse is seen meeting with Wo Fat in prison, who wants to know how much McGarrett knows about his father's case.
13	13	"Ke Kinohi" "The Beginning"	Brad Turner	Story by : Peter M. Lenkov; Teleplay by : Nicole Ranadive	January 3, 2011	113	11.00
McGarrett awakens to masked men breaking into his house and stealing the Champ box containing the investigation into his mother's murder. Mary is kidnapped for her own investigation and calls McGarrett from the trunk of a car. Five-0 track the car and rescue her. The two hostiles are members of the Yakuza. Despite that the box is still missing, Mary previously took pictures of every item in the box. They later raid a gambling den and find the third assailant, Hiro Noshimuri, believed to be involved in not only the kidnapping but McGarrett's mother's death. However, he is also connected to Governor Jameson, who warns McGarrett that to put Noshimuri away, they must find solid evidence. After finding the missing box, McGarrett manages to tie Hiro Noshimuri to Mary's kidnapping, but not his mother's death. In the end, McGarrett hears that Hiro Noshimuri's brother has been killed in a car accident. Note: This is the final episode to feature Taryn Manning as a main cast member credited as "also starring"
14	14	"He Kane Hewaʻole" "An Innocent Man"	Chris Fisher	Peter M. Lenkov & Paul Zbyszewski	January 17, 2011	114	10.83
Chin Ho and Kono join HPD in a car chase, which ends with the car crashing and killing the driver. Five-0 finds a severed head in a cardboard box. After finding out the driver's family are illegal immigrants from China, McGarrett tries to clear him, but Danny does not resort to the same courtesy. The team identify the man as Henry Duncan, a thyroid cancer patient being treated by Chin Ho's former fiancée Malia (Reiko Aylesworth). Later, they discover Nicole Duncan (Amanda Schull), the victim's wife is missing. Robert Rovin (Greg Germann), the woman's father and businessman, is given a call to deliver five million dollars to a specified location in exchange for his daughter's safety. Things go awry when McGarrett and Danny kill the suspect who takes the money.
15	15	"Kai eʻe" "Tidal Wave"	Duane Clark	Melissa Glenn & Jessica Rieder	January 23, 2011	115	19.34
The population of Hawaii are forced to evacuate the coast in the wake of a tsunami threat. Five-0 investigates the disappearance of Dr. Norman Russell (John Sullivan), the head of the Tsunami Warning Center. McGarrett later realizes that the approaching tsunami does not exist, and that Russell was kidnapped to transmit the false data. After they rescue him, Five-0 discovers that Sam Hale (Brian Goodman), a United States Coast Guard Commander, orchestrated the plot to break into the empty precinct where the $28 million (first mentioned in "Hana ʻaʻa Makehewa") is held. Five-0 decides to confess their previous theft to Governor Jameson, however McGarrett is somewhat disturbed to learn that all $28 million were recovered. Meanwhile, McGarret and Catherine Rollins continue their on-again, off-again relationship. Also, Danny tasks Kamekona with watching over Grace during the investigation.
16	16	"E Malama" "To Protect"	Brad Turner	Story by : Carol Barbee; Teleplay by : Kyle Harimoto & Shane Salerno	February 7, 2011	116	11.01
Five-0 are tasked to find Julie Masters (Mariana Klaveno), the key witness against drug cartel leader Aaron Brenner (Robert Prescott). She disappears after Brenner sends two assassins after her. McGarrett and Chin Ho journey through the forest to find her. When Chin Ho finds her, they find there is also a third assassin after her, and a "cleaner". Meanwhile, Danny hears that two assailants carjacked his ex-wife's car. Because Grace was present, he becomes fixated on solving the case. After confronting Rachel's current husband Stan (Mark Deklin), he discovers tapes incriminating housing commissioner Bruce Hoffman (Barry Levi) of corruption. Danny threatens Hoffman to back off or he will expose the tapes to the press.
17	17	"Powa Maka Moana" "Pirate"	Brad Turner	Joe Halpin	February 14, 2011	117	10.73
Twelve college students on a catamaran during spring break are kidnapped by a gang of pirates. As Five-0 lead a search to find the hostages, the pirates make ransom demands of $20 million for each hostage to their wealthy parents. The team storms a house believed to be where the hostages are kept, but instead find a pirate stronghold who were not involved in the kidnapping. After the parents of one of the hostages pay the pirates $400,000 as down payment, their son is found murdered. Afterwards the kidnappers demand that Susan (Vanessa Minnillo), a crew member of the catamaran who evaded the pirates, deliver the money to them. McGarrett gives in, but realizes Susan was involved.
18	18	"Loa Aloha" "The Long Goodbye"	Eric Laneuville	Paul Zbyszewski & Mike Schaub	February 21, 2011	118	10.45
The children of a state judge and prosecutor are killed, one by having the rope cut while zip-lining, the second in a car bombing. After researching cases the state judge & prosecutor worked together on, Five-0 believe the murderer is Travis Roan (Theo Coumbis). His 20-year-old son was prosecuted by the two men for DUI, and was later killed in prison. Meanwhile, Danny's younger brother Matthew (Dane Cook) comes to Hawaii. He later learns that the Federal Bureau of Investigation (FBI) suspects him of fraud. Danny reluctantly tips off his brother. As Matthew leaves the Island, Danny realizes he was wanted for laundering money to a drug cartel.
19	19	"Ne Meʻe Laua Na Paio" "Heroes and Villains"	Matt Earl Beesley	J. R. Orci & David Wolkove	March 21, 2011	119	10.01
Alex Baker, dressed as superhero Captain Fallout during a science fiction convention, falls to his death from a high hotel floor. After following leads in the investigation, Five-0 ultimately learn that Baker was drunk and went to the wrong room that was just above his own. The room's owner was in possession of a memory card containing footage of Lindsay Roberts, a young woman who disappeared (and was murdered) in late 2008, who had been having an affair with her boss, Richard Davies (D. B. Sweeney). Meanwhile, McGarrett teams up with CIA analyst Jenna Kaye (Larisa Oleynik), who is running her own investigation without the CIA's backing, regarding the deaths of his parents killed by Wo Fat. In the end, Wo Fat meets with McGarrett and warns McGarrett not to dig into his parents' past.
20	20	"Ma Ke Kahakai" "Shore"	Larry Teng	Elwood Reid	April 11, 2011	120	9.54
While hiking in the Ko'olau Range, McGarrett and Danny find a dead body with a gunshot wound. McGarrett falls and breaks an arm while examining him. Later, the team finds the body matches 53-year-old fisherman Jack Leung. It is revealed that Leung took a second job at an air strip, where he came across plans for Donald Rutheford (Wayne Duvall) to help his son leave the country after he is wanted for murder, and was killed for it. Meanwhile, Chin Ho and Kono visit their ailing Aunt Mele. Chin Ho is later forced to admit that it was their uncle who stole the $200,000 for a kidney from the black market to save Auntie Mele, and Chin Ho got the heat for the theft. In the end, they learn Mele died.
21	21	"Hoʻopaʻi" "Revenge"	Duane Clark	Story by : Shane Salerno & Peter M. Lenkov; Teleplay by : Shane Salerno	April 18, 2011	121	11.44
NYPD detective Reggie Cole (Sean Combs) has been undercover for the FBI working for a New York crime boss Jimmy Cannon (Keith David) for two years. The boss' trip to Hawaii also allows for Reggie to briefly drop in on Lisa, his wife (Selita Ebanks) and son Kevin. One night, two gunmen attack his home, kill his wife and seriously wound him. Though warned by the FBI not to pursue Cannon, Five-0 continue anyway. Realizing Cole is tracking the investigation, the team later catch up to him, where he announces a surprising development in the case: Cannon did not order his wife's death. Cole is cleared for the first gunman's death and is then allowed to continue the investigation in taking down Cannon.
22	22	"Hoʻohuli Naʻau" "Close to Heart"	Brad Turner	Story by : Peter M. Lenkov; Teleplay by : Kyle Harimoto	May 2, 2011	122	9.83
A world-renowned photographer, Renny Sinclair, is shooting swimsuit models, one of which he was planning a new life with after finding out she is pregnant with his child, when he returns to his trailer, which then explodes. Five-0 discovers a connection to Sinclair and Derek Marcum, a betting shop owner who loaned Sinclair almost $291,570. It is later revealed that this amount of money is equal to the Department of Agriculture's estimated cost of raising a child to age 18. Sinclair has a daughter from a previous relationship, who also happens to be an assistant of his. Chin Ho is called by Internal Affairs to testify against his uncle after he confesses that it was he and not Chin Ho, who stole the money in the corruption case. Chin Ho responds by "confessing" he took the money, but never spent it. He is ordered to pay it back, but since he was bluffing, Chin Ho goes to Marcum for a loan.
23	23	"Ua Hiki Mai Kapalena Pau" "Until the End is Near"	Steve Boyum	Story by : Peter M. Lenkov; Teleplay by : David Wolkove	May 9, 2011	123	9.45
Five-0 and Jenna Kaye close in on Wo Fat's whereabouts, but find Sang Min instead. Min evades the team during a chase, during which Danny spots a dead man in an apartment. Danny is infected with sarin nerve gas. While he recovers, the team's search for Wo Fat is on hold until they solve the sarin case. Kono finds that a Russian terrorist with connections to sarin is on the island. He dies accidentally exposing himself to sarin while Five-0 give chase to him, but they find the canisters in his car are all empty and were made by a company run by Elliot Connor and owned by Jeff Fallon, who lives in the same house in which the first victim was found. Meanwhile, IA reveals the money Chin Ho paid back was not from the 28 million dollars, and they would arrest his uncle. Sang Min shows up and gives himself up. He wants protection because Wo Fat wants him dead.
24	24	"Oia'i'o" "Trust"	Brad Turner	Peter M. Lenkov & Paul Zbyszewski	May 16, 2011	124	10.41
Chin Ho turns down HPD's offer to rejoin the force. On his way out, he finds officers bringing in the burnt money Hesse burned (in "Hana ʻaʻa Makehewa"). Meanwhile Laura Hills is killed by a bomb. McGarrett and Danny examine her home and find she was the one who sent McGarrett clues from the Champ box. They also find a key McGarrett believes opens a desk in Governor Jameson's mansion, that has fingerprints belonging to McGarrett. They find a suspect who can testify against Wo Fat, but is later killed during transport. McGarrett believes Jameson is involved. He breaks into the mansion to find evidence that she knew Hills was sending McGarrett the information. When he returns to Five-0, HPD arrives to arrest him for Hills' murder. He escapes and asks Kamekona for arms. McGarrett breaks into the mansion again and forces Jameson to confess to Hills' murder only to be tasered by Wo Fat, who takes his gun, kills Jameson, and places it back in McGarrett's hand. Police and Chin Ho, who regained his position with HPD, arrive to arrest McGarrett. Kono is also arrested for stealing the $10 million from the forfeiture locker.

== Production ==
=== Development ===
CBS initially announced that a pilot for a possible Hawaii Five-O reboot had been ordered into production on February 18, 2010. Len Wiseman was announced as the director a few days later. Based on the strength of the pilot, the network ordered Hawaii Five-0 to series on May 19, 2010. The series premiered on September 20, 2010, and after five episodes aired, CBS gave the show a full season order on October 21. The first season was executive produced by the three co-creators Alex Kurtzman, Roberto Orci and Peter M. Lenkov, with the latter serving as head writer and day-to-day showrunner. Len Wiseman also executive produced the pilot episode, which he directed. Brad Turner, Sarah Goldfinger, J. R. Orci, Elwood Reid and Paul Zbyszewski all served as co-executive producers along with Carol Barbee and Shane Salerno, who were consulting producers. The season's twenty-four episodes had thirteen different directors. Brad Turner accumulated the most credits with eight episodes, including the season finale. Matt Earl Beesley directed three episodes while Duane Clark and Chris Fisher directed two each. The remaining eight episodes were directed by Paul Edwards, Alex Zakrzewski, James Whitmore, Jr., Elodie Keene, Frederick E. O. Toye, Eric Laneuville, Larry Teng and Steve Boyum. Filming of the season concluded on April 14, 2011. The season concluded on May 16, 2011. A day earlier, on May 15, 2011, CBS announced that the show would be renewed for a second season that premiered on September 19, 2011.

=== Casting ===
Daniel Dae Kim was the first to be cast in the series on February 8, 2010, to play Chin Ho Kelly, an ex-cop trained by Steve McGarrett's father. Several days later on February 10 it was announced that Alex O'Loughlin joined as Steve McGarrett. Taryn Manning also joined the cast as Mary Ann McGarrett, Steve's sister. Actress Grace Park was announced to be starring on March 1, 2010, as rookie detective Kona "Kono" Kalakaua. Although in the original series, the character of Kono was male, the reboot series swapped the cop's gender in order to steer clear of a task force void of women. Scott Caan was the final member join the series on March 5, 2010, cast as Danny "Danno" Williams. On December 22, 2010, it was announced that Taryn Manning would be departing the series. She was originally expected to appear in the first four episodes and then recur throughout the season however, her only appearance in "Pilot" ended up being a deleted scene and her first appearance broadcast on television did not come until episode four. Manning's third and final episode as a main cast member was "Ke Kinohi" but she makes guest appearances in subsequent seasons. On September 3, 2010, it was reported that Jean Smart had been cast as Governor Pat Jameson Masi Oka appeared as guest star playing the chief medical examiner Max Bergman. It was reported that Mark Dacascos would be starring as Wo Fat on November 3, 2010. Michelle Borth had a recurring role in the season as Lieutenant Rollins, Steve McGarrett's girlfriend. Larisa Oleynik was cast in a recurring role, as ex-CIA analyst Jenna Kaye, with the option to become a series regular in the second season. Claire van der Boom appeared in a recurring role as Rachel Edwards, Danny's ex-wife. Dennis Chun, son of Kam Fong Chun who played Chin Ho Kelly on the original series, guest starred in multiple episodes as Honolulu Police Department Sergeant Duke Lukela.

== Release and marketing ==
The pilot episode was originally released as an advance screening at Queen's Surf Beach in Waikiki on September 13, 2010. One week later, the season began airing on television on September 20, in the 10 p.m. (ET) timeslot on Mondays, on the 42nd anniversary the original show premiered. The fifteenth episode, "Kai eʻe", aired as a special episode following an AFC Championship Game on Sunday, January 23, 2011. The season finale, "Oiaʻiʻo", aired on May 16, 2011, at the same Monday timeslot.

== Reception ==
=== Critical response ===
The season was met with generally positive reviews from critics. R. L. Shaffer of IGN rated the season eight out of ten, signifying a "great" season. Shaffer stated that although it was not "particularly refreshing," the season was "damn good, with great cinematography, solid performances and slick, stylized action and drama." Dave Trumbore of Collider stated "The new Five-O plays like an action-packed combination of The A-Team's antics with the realism of The Shield. Though season one doesn't choose to go nearly as dark as many episodes of The Shield did, Alex O'Loughlin brings his physical presence and stunt training from that series into Five-O." Trumbore was also receptive towards the action sequences, which he felt was "one main sell of the show." Stuart Galbraith of DVD Talk had "many criticisms" with the season, but liked some aspects of the show because "clearly there's an attempt to draw from the best elements of the original series."

=== Awards and nominations ===
The first season was nominated for seven awards, two of which were won. The season was voted "Favourite New TV Drama" at the 37th People's Choice Awards. Keith Power and Brian Tyler also won the series a Broadcast Music, Inc. (BMI) award. Scott Cann was nominated for a 68th Golden Globe Awards for Best Supporting Actor – Series, Miniseries or Television Film; Glee actor Chris Colfer became the winner of the award. Series stunt coordinator Jeff David Cadiente was nominated for a 63rd Primetime Emmy Awards for Outstanding Stunt Coordination in the episode "Ua Hiki Mai Kapalena Pau", but lost to cable crime drama Southland. The first season was also nominated for three 2011 Teen Choice Awards; the season for Choice TV Show: Action, Daniel Dae Kim for Choice TV Actor: Action, and Grace Park for Choice TV Actress: Action. They lost to NCIS: Los Angeles, Nikita actor Shane West, and NCIS: Los Angeles actress Linda Hunt, respectively.

=== Ratings ===
The first season premiered to 14.2 million viewers and earned a 3.9/11 ratings share among adults aged 18–49. Although it was one of the highest-rated new series of the season, its premiere was down ten percent from the eighth-season premiere of CSI: Miami, which had occupied the same time slot the previous year. The season reached its highest ratings with the fifteenth episode, "Kai eʻe", which attracted 19.34 million viewers and earned a 5.6 rating among adults aged 18–49. The season's lowest audience came with the penultimate episode, "Ua Hiki Mai Kapalena Pau", which was watched by 9.45 million viewers. Viewership rebounded for the season finale, which drew 10.41 million viewers.

The season also recorded the second-largest increase in Digital video recorder (DVR) viewership during the 2010–11 television season, behind Modern Family, gaining an average of 3.3 million viewers through DVR playback. Overall, Hawaii Five-0 ranked as the 22nd most-watched television series of the 2010–11 season, averaging 11.96 million viewers. In the adults 18–49 demographic, it ranked 33rd with an average 3.3 rating.

No.	Episode	Air date	18–49 rating	Viewers (million)	Weekly rank	Live +7 18–49 (Note: Live +7 refers to viewers who watched the episode either live or within seven days of its original broadcast by means of DVR or online streaming.)	Live +7 viewers (million)
1	"Pilot"	September 20, 2010	3.9	14.20	11	5.0	17.59
2	"Ohana"	September 27, 2010	3.6	12.72	16	4.7	16.07
3	"Malama Ka Aina"	October 4, 2010	3.5	12.24	16	4.6	15.42
4	"Lanakila"	October 11, 2010	3.1	10.70	25	4.2	13.61
5	"Nalowale"	October 18, 2010	2.9	10.94	25	3.9	13.95
6	"Ko'olauloa"	October 25, 2010	2.8	10.23	N/A	3.7	13.14
7	"Ho'apono"	November 1, 2010	3.0	10.86	21	4.1	14.11
8	"Mana'o"	November 8, 2010	2.9	10.23	N/A	4.1	13.76
9	"Po'ipu"	November 15, 2010	2.8	10.34	N/A	3.9	13.58
10	"Heihei"	November 22, 2010	3.3	12.34	9	4.4	15.72
11	"Palekaiko"	December 6, 2010	2.8	10.51	21	3.9	13.94
12	"Hana 'a'a Makehewa"	December 13, 2010	2.8	10.91	16	3.9	14.11
13	"Ke Kinohi"	January 3, 2011	2.9	11.00	17	4.1	14.92
14	"He Kane Hewa'ole"	January 17, 2011	2.9	10.83	18	4.2	14.38
15	"Kai e'e"	January 23, 2011	5.6	19.34	6	N/A	N/A
16	"E Malama"	February 7, 2011	2.8	11.01	18	4.0	14.33
17	"Powa Maka Moana"	February 14, 2011	2.8	10.73	16	4.0	13.99
18	"Loa Aloha"	February 21, 2011	2.8	10.45	20	4.0	13.82
19	"Na Me'e Laua Na Paio"	March 21, 2011	2.9	10.01	18	4.1	13.45
20	"Ma Ke Kahakai"	April 11, 2011	2.5	9.54	18	3.5	12.73
21	"Ho'opa'i"	April 18, 2011	2.8	11.44	6	3.8	14.71
22	"Ho'ohuli Na'au"	May 2, 2011	2.5	9.83	23	3.5	12.88
23	"Ua Hiki Mai Kapalena Pau"	May 9, 2011	2.3	9.45	N/A	3.3	12.67
24	"Oia'i'o"	May 16, 2011	2.7	10.41	15	3.7	13.61

== Home video release ==
The DVD box set of the first season was first released by CBS DVD and Paramount Home Entertainment in the United States (Region 1) on September 20, 2011, the United Kingdom (Region 2) on September 26, 2011, and Australia (Region 4) on December 1, 2011. The season was also released on Blu-ray in the US and UK on the same day as their DVD counterparts. The season box set consists of six discs, featuring all 24 episodes as well as bonus material including behind the scenes footage, deleted scenes, and audio commentaries on two episodes.

Hawaii Five-0: The First Season
Set details	Special features	
24 episodes; 6-disc set; 1.78:1 aspect ratio; Languages: English (Dolby Digital 5.1, with subtitles); Subtitles in French, Spanish, Portuguese, Dutch, Finnish, Swedish, Danish, and Norwegian; Audio commentaries on "Pilot" and "E Malama"	Shore Lines: The Story of Season 1; Aloha Action!; Grace Park's Hawaiian Tour; Legacy (comparing both series); Picture Perfect: The Making of the Pilot; Re-scoring the Theme Song; Inside Comic-Con; Inside the Box; CBS Launch Promos; Deleted Scenes; Gag Reel	
DVD release dates
Region 1	Region 2	Region 4
September 20, 2011	September 26, 2011	December 1, 2011
Blu-ray release dates
Region A		Region B
September 20, 2011		September 26, 2011
