= Magnum P.I. (2018 TV series) season 5 =

Magnum P.I.
- Season 5
- Promotional poster
- Showrunners: Eric Guggenheim; Gene Hong
- Starring: Jay Hernandez; Perdita Weeks; Zachary Knighton; Stephen Hill; Amy Hill; Tim Kang
- No. of episodes: 20

Release
- Original network: NBC
- Original release: February 19, 2023 – January 3, 2024

Season chronology
- ← Previous; Season 4

The fifth and final season of the American crime and action drama Magnum P.I. premiered on February 19, 2023 and ended on January 3, 2024, on NBC. It is the only season of the series to air on NBC after it was canceled by CBS following the conclusion of the previous season.

A remake of the 1980 series of the same name, Magnum P.I. centers on Thomas Magnum, a former Navy SEAL who works as a private investigator and solves mysteries with his business partner Juliet Higgins and other friends. The season stars Jay Hernandez, Perdita Weeks, Zachary Knighton, Stephen Hill, Amy Hill, and Tim Kang. It is set to consist of twenty episodes split into two parts. Larry Manetti, who starred on the original Magnum, P.I., appeared in an episode of the season as his Hawaii Five-0 character in a minor crossover event.

== Cast and characters ==
=== Main ===
- Jay Hernandez as Thomas Magnum, a former Navy SEAL who is a security consultant for the successful novelist Robin Masters, living in the guest house on his estate, while also working as a private investigator
- Perdita Weeks as Juliet Higgins, a former MI6 agent who is majordomo to Robin Masters; she and Magnum are partners in the PI business and, following the events of the previous season, pursuing a romantic relationship.
- Zachary Knighton as Orville "Rick" Wright, a Marine veteran and former door gunner, who runs his own tiki bar and is also a former playboy and is now a father.
- Stephen Hill as Theodore "T.C." Calvin, a Marine veteran and helicopter pilot who runs helicopter tours of Hawaii and is a member of Magnum's team.
- Amy Hill as Teuila "Kumu" Tuileta, the cultural curator of Robin Masters' estate.
- Tim Kang as suspended Honolulu Police Department (HPD) Detective Gordon Katsumoto, who dislikes Magnum's investigative methods but usually comes to the team's aid when needed.

=== Recurring ===
- Michael Rady as HPD Detective Chris Childs, who took the job vacated by Katsumoto
- Bobby Lee as Jin Jeong
- James Remar as Captain Buck Greene
- Michael DeLara as M.E. Gabriel Santos
- Lee Anne Kuper as HPD Officer Lee
- Christopher Thornton as Kenny "Shammy" Shamberg
- Betsy Phillips as Suzy Madison

=== Guest ===
- Emily Alabi as Mahina
- Martin Martinez as Cade Jensen
- Lance Lim as Dennis Katsumoto
- Rachel Baeq as K-Pop star Rae Song
- Shawn Christian as Cole Graham, a lifeguard working at a beach near Robin's Nest
- Jonathan Stanley as Mercenary Paul Swyzak
- Michele Hicks as Nadine Amherst
- Alain Uy as Milo
- Dennis Oh as Kanoa Clarke
- Sab Shimono as George Nakamura

=== Crossover ===
- Larry Manetti as Nicky "The Kid" DeMarco

== Episodes ==
The number in the "No. overall" column refers to the episode's number within the overall series, whereas the number in the "No. in season" column refers to the episode's number within this particular season. "Production code" refers to the order in which the episodes were produced while "U.S. viewers (millions)" refers to the number of viewers in the U.S. in millions who watched the episode as it was aired.

=== Part 1 ===
List of Magnum P.I. season 5 episodes
No. overall	No. in season	Title	Directed by	Written by	Original release date	Prod. code	U.S. viewers (millions)
77	1	"The Passenger"	Bryan Spicer	Eric Guggenheim	February 19, 2023	MPI501	3.87
Magnum and Higgins take a woman's case when she suspects a car crash that killed her husband was not an accident. Images from a traffic light camera reveal a blonde woman was in the passenger seat of the man's car just minutes before the crash. Meanwhile, Magnum and Higgins decide to keep their new romantic relationship hidden from their friends. Elsewhere, T.C. tries to convince Katsumoto to fight for his badge, after Gordon was fired from HPD for breaking a man out of prison to help rescue his kidnapped ex-wife (episode 4.20). Also, Magnum learns his former Navy Captain Buck Greene has not been seen for several days. It's revealed that Greene was kidnapped by a group of men who want him to give up the location of Magnum, Rick and T.C.
78	2	"The Breaking Point"	Bryan Spicer	Gene Hong	February 19, 2023	MPI502	3.30
Magnum and Higgins pose as lifeguards to investigate the suspicious overdose death of former lifeguard Karina, whose brother says she had been clean for three years. Meanwhile, as they help Rick move into his new place, T.C. and Jin bid on a storage unit that Jin later admits is owned by a thief. They then find a stolen Purple Heart, which T.C. is determined to return to its owner. The episode closes with a body in the morgue that is revealed to be Captain Buck Greene.
79	3	"Number one with a Bullet"	Eagle Egilsson	David Wolkove	February 26, 2023	MPI503	3.70
As Magnum and T.C. identify Captain Greene's body in the morgue, Higgins assists Rick who says his friend had a case of rare, valuable whiskey stolen. They arrive to find Rick's friend dead, and three armed men take them hostage until Magnum and T.C. can locate the whiskey. Elsewhere, Gordon takes a job as a security guard for a young K-pop singer who is in town for a concert, only for Gordon to suffer a stabbing which he later ties to the Korean mob. The episode closes with Magnum, Rick and T.C. realizing that Captain Greene died from asphyxiation related to waterboarding. Using a clue from Greene's watch hands, they determine that whoever killed Greene was also looking for the black ops team that successfully eliminated a high value target back in 2016 – namely, Magnum, T.C. and Rick.
80	4	"NSFW"	Eagle Egilsson	David Slack	March 5, 2023	MPI504	3.56
Magnum and Higgins search for a solar power company CEO named Sandra Perez, who has mysteriously gone missing on the day of a major shareholder announcement. It is so unlike her that her business partner, Jordan Hines, decides to hire Magnum and Juliette to investigate. When Higgins finds Sandra dead, a capital management company backed by big oil is the initial suspect, but she and Magnum later find a more personal motive was involved. Meanwhile Rick braces for a visit from his little sister, Ruthie. Also, Magnum asks Gordon to get an HPD file that may help with the case of Captain Greene's death. Gordon is initially reluctant because he has a reinstatement hearing coming up, but he ultimately comes through for Thomas.
81	5	"Welcome to Paradise, Now Die!"	Marcus Stokes	Tera Tolentino	March 12, 2023	MPI505	3.29
Magnum enlists Gordon's help in locating a husband and father who suddenly disappeared during a family vacation. They learn the man is using the identity of someone who died ten years ago, and make a connection to past mob activity. Meanwhile, Higgins and Kumu help a woman whose cherished dog unexpectedly died. They learn the dog ate lemon squares laced with strychnine, making Higgins sure that the poison was meant for the dog's owner. Elsewhere, T.C. and Rick find evidence that Magnum is seeing someone, but they aren't yet sure that it's Higgins.
82	6	"Dead Ringer"	Marcus Stokes	Barbie Kligman	March 19, 2023	MPI506	3.07
Magnum and Higgins receive a stack of cash from an unknown client asking them to investigate a man named Jack Hill. They deduce through multiple clues that the client is an anesthesiologist who believes she heard a confession from Hill as he was going under for an appendectomy, telling the detectives that Hill mumbled, "no one will ever find her." Elsewhere, Gordon prepares for his reinstatement hearing and gets unexpected advice from his son, Dennis. Meanwhile, Rick and T.C. are now certain that Magnum's mystery woman is Higgins, and they share their theory with Kumu.
83	7	"Birthright"	Doug Hannah	Andre Jackson & Eric Guggenheim	March 26, 2023	MPI507	2.73
Magnum and Higgins investigate the robbery of an elderly man called Gus. Two masked men broke into his home, and to their surprise, he suddenly pulled a gun and killed one of them. The other guy got away with some valuables, including a precious necklace that belonged to the elderly man’s late wife, so Gus wants justice. With the police unable help him, he and his daughter Kerry turn to Higgins for help. Higgins agrees to look into the thieves, while Magnum meets up with a woman named Verna who wants help finding her estranged son. Verna then tells Magnum that her son is T.C.
84	8	"Dark Skies"	Doug Hannah	Andrew Blazensky & Tera Tolentino	April 2, 2023	MPI508	3.59
Magnum and Rick make a shocking discovery in the Captain Greene case. Lewis Peele was paid to lie about Greene, and now Magnum wants his assistance finding the men that had Greene murdered. Higgins and T.C. head to Maul to help an eccentric billionaire named Nolan Pierce find the owner of a pesky drone harassing him. Shammy helps Kumu after decorations made of precious wood are stolen from La Mariana. The culprit turns out to be a young kid, who gets caught quickly, but Kumu soon learns of the kid's situation.
85	9	"Out of Sight, Out of Mind"	Jay Hernandez	David Slack	April 16, 2023	MPI509	3.29
Magnum and Higgins are hired by the fiancee of a deceased man who worked as an orderly in a psychiatric hospital. While the death was listed as suicide, there are several suspicious circumstances. Higgins goes undercover as a newly hired psychotherapist, and nearly becomes a victim herself when the killer is cornered. Meanwhile, Gordon and his son take a trip to the mainland to visit a college that Dennis is interested in attending. While in a restaurant, the two are harassed by a racist man, which has Dennis reconsidering his school choice. Elsewhere, Detective Childs follows up on leads regarding the men who are after Magnum, Rick and T.C., and he ends up in a house that explodes. Soon, one of the mercenaries corners T.C. at his jobsite and points a gun at him.
86	10	"Charlie Foxtrot"	Lisa Robinson	David Wolkove	April 23, 2023	MPI510	3.12
As T.C. lay bleeding out from a gunshot wound, Rick is taken hostage, but not before he is able to get a message to Magnum that the mercenaries who are set on avenging the death of Ahmad Hadid are after all of them. Magnum gets the message just in time to thwart an attack at Robin's Nest. Juliette is able to identify the mastermind of the plot as Nadine Amherst, who was once Hadid's handler before forming a romantic bond with him and then giving birth to their son after Hadid was killed. Magnum engineers a prison escape for one of the mercenaries, knowing the man will lead them to Nadine and Rick. Magnum, Higgins, Gordon and HPD are able to rescue Rick while taking down Nadine and her cohorts. T.C. wakes up in a hospital alive, but unable to feel his legs or feet.

=== Part 2 ===
List of Magnum P.I. season 5 episodes
No. overall	No. in season	Title	Directed by	Written by	Original release date	Prod. code	U.S. viewers (millions)
87	11	"Hit and Run"	David Straiton	Gene Hong	October 4, 2023	MPI511	3.57
Magnum and Higgins are contacted anonymously by a contract killer who was hired to kill a 12 year old girl but refuses the job, informing Magnum and Higgins that someone else will take the contract and they must act to save her. While tracking the girl, Magnum and Higgins wrestle with the possibility that they might be expecting a child of their own. Meanwhile, Rick meets a potential new love interest and Shammy and Kumu help TC adjust to his paralysis.
88	12	"Three Bridges"	David Straiton	Barbie Kligman	October 11, 2023	MPI512	3.35
Magnum and Higgins take on the case of a woman whose life savings was stolen by an online scammer. The case takes an interesting turn, however, when the scammer is revealed to be the victim of human trafficking and his victim implores the detectives to find and save the online mystery man. Meanwhile, Rick struggles with potentially dating again due to his unresolved relationship with Suzy and T.C. is pushing his friends and family away while struggling with his physical therapy, until he receives an unexpected visit from his mother.
89	13	"Appetite for Danger"	Ruba Nadda	Eric Guggenheim & David Slack	October 18, 2023	MPI513	3.27
Magnum and Higgins take the case of a gourmet chef who goes missing. While they try to track his movements, they send Katsumoto undercover in the kitchen to question the staff. Kumu and Cade listen to the story of a man who was held in Japanese internment camps during World War II and lost his sister to the system. While T.C. continues to struggle with his physical therapy, Rick struggles to coach the Island Hoppers Little League team. Special Guest Appearance by Larry Manetti, who starred in the original series as Rick Wright, as his Hawaii Five-0 character Nicky "The Kid" DeMarco.
90	14	"Night Has a Thousand Eyes"	Ruba Nadda	Tera Tolentino	October 25, 2023	MPI514	3.19
Magnum and Higgins take a P.I. license renewal test. While Magnum passes, Higgins surprisingly fails and says she has never failed anything in her life and says she'll pass next time. Thomas chooses Rick to work on a case and decided to help someone named Justin whom Magnum met in prison. Justin had confessed that he and his friend Adam were driving home from La Mariana and crashed into a police car, killing Adam and the cop in both vehicles. Justin was sitting in the passenger seat and would have suffered the same fate, if not for a mysterious stranger, breaking the windows, and pulling both men out of the car. When the cops found both men outside, it wasn’t possible to tell who was driving. Because it was Justin’s car, the cops arrest him with vehicle manslaughter, even though he wasn’t driving. Justin will face eight years in prison, unless Magnum and Rick can find the witness that dragged him out of the car and prove he wasn’t driving it.
91	15	"The Retrieval"	Benny Boom	Gene Hong & Katie Varney	November 1, 2023	MPI515	3.07
Magnum and Higgins are hired to find a missing gamer whose online friends believe he might be in trouble; Jin Jeong enlists the help of TC in a treasure hunt after his ex-partner gets out of prison.
92	16	"Run with the Devil" "Suffer Little Children"	Benny Boom	David Wolkove	November 15, 2023	MPI516	3.32
Magnum and Higgins are hired by a young Amish teenager to help track down his sister, who came to the island for her rumspringa and never returned. They soon learn that the girl is caught up in a deep world of trouble. Meanwhile, Rick is preparing for the annual Marine Corps Ball and is trying to figure out why T.C. is refusing to attend.
93	17	"Consciousness of Guilt"	Zachary Knighton	Andre Jackson & David Slack	December 6, 2023	MPI517	3.01
After a high-stakes homicide case falls apart at trial, Katsumoto asks Magnum to help him stop a killer from walking free. Higgins helps Jin Jeong with a mystery surrounding Jin's dog-sitting client.
94	18	"Extracurricular Activities"	Perdita Weeks	Katie Varney	December 13, 2023	MPI518	2.93
Magnum and Higgins are hired by a University of Oahu dean to quietly investigate a professor who has been accused of having an inappropriate relationship with a female grad student. TC and Katsumoto take Cade and Dennis on a father-son camping trip, where TC is surprised to learn that Cade wants to join the Marines.
95	19	"Ashes to Ashes"	Eagle Egilsson	Tera Tolentino & Andrew Blazensky & Barbie Kligman	January 3, 2024	MPI519	3.88
Magnum and Higgins re-examine a fatal arson investigation at the request of TC and Mahina, leading to a sinister discovery. Kumu volunteers with Rick at a veterans' crisis call centre.
96	20	"The Big Squeeze"	Avi Youabian	Eric Guggenheim & David Wolkove	January 3, 2024	MPI520	3.48
Magnum and Higgins take a major step forward in their relationship, but Higgins has conflicting thoughts when she finds an engagement ring in the guest house. At the same time, the past comes back to haunt them when a previous suspect becomes their client. TC aims to scale up Island Hoppers, while Rick gets a new business partner. Higgins learns that Magnum was only holding the engagement ring for Rick, when Suzy enters La Mariana flashing the ring on her finger. Higgins and Magnum have a heart-to-heart about their future, with Higgins saying she was prepared to say "yes."

=== Crossovers ===
Despite Hawaii Five-0 ending in 2020, Larry Manetti is still set to make a guest appearance in an episode of the season as his Hawaii Five-0 character, Nicky "The Kid" DeMarco, after previously making a guest appearance in the second season of Magnum P.I.

== Production ==
=== Development ===
On May 12, 2022, six days after the conclusion of the fourth season, Magnum P.I. was canceled by CBS. However, on May 23, 2022, it was reported by TVLine that Universal Television was trying to shop the series around. Ten days later, Deadline Hollywood reported that talks were underway for the series to potentially be carried by NBC and/or USA. Such a move would require a deal with CBS Studios by June 30, 2022, when the cast members' options on their contracts end. By June 10, Production Weekly reported a fifth season to be in "active development", though with no network attached to the listing. On June 30, 2022, NBC officially picked up the series for 20 episodes, initially to be split over two 10-episode seasons, with the option for more episodes. At the time, it was reported that the executive producers would return and CBS Studios and Universal TV would continue to co-produce the series. It was later clarified that the twenty episodes would be split as a two-part fifth season rather than into two separate seasons. On June 23, 2023, it was announced that the fifth season would be its last.

=== Filming and writing ===
On July 4, 2022, it was reported by TVLine that production on the season would begin in late 2022. Filming began on September 19, 2022, with a traditional Hawaiian blessing. The season is being written at the same time as the sixth season.

=== Casting ===
With the renewal in June 2022, it was expected that all six cast members would return. On October 3, 2022, it was reported by TVLine that Michael Rady has been cast in a recurring role as HPD Detective Chris Childs, debuting in the season premiere. Returning guest stars for the season include Emily Alana and Martin Martinez.

== Release ==
In July 2022, it was reported that the season was not likely to premiere until January 2023 at the earliest. In November 2022, it was announced that the season would premiere on February 19, 2023. The season airs on Sundays at 9:00 PM ET. It follows Dateline NBC and leads into the tenth and final season of The Blacklist. The season premiered with two back-to-back episodes. Each episode is available to stream on Peacock the day after it airs on NBC. The final two episodes were set to air in late-December 2023 but were pushed to early-2024 to fill in gaps left by the 2023 SAG-AFTRA strike. The series ended on January 3, 2024.

== Ratings ==
Viewership and ratings per episode of Magnum P.I. (2018 TV series) season 5
No.	Title	Air date	Rating (18–49)	Viewers (millions)
1	"The Passenger"	February 19, 2023	0.4	3.87
2	"The Breaking Point"	February 19, 2023	0.3	3.30
3	"Number one with a Bullet"	February 26, 2023	0.3	3.70
4	"NSFW"	March 5, 2023	0.3	3.56
5	"Welcome to Paradise, Now Die!"	March 12, 2023	0.3	3.29
6	"Dead Ringer"	March 19, 2023	0.3	3.07
7	"Birthright"	March 26, 2023	0.2	2.73
8	"Dark Skies"	April 2, 2023	0.3	3.59
9	"Out of Sight, Out of Mind"	April 16, 2023	0.2	3.29
10	"Charlie Foxtrot"	April 23, 2023	0.3	3.12
11	"Hit and Run"	October 4, 2023	0.4	3.57
12	"Three Bridges"	October 11, 2023	0.4	3.35
13	"Appetite for Danger"	October 18, 2023	0.4	3.15
14	"Night Has a Thousand Eyes"	October 25, 2023	0.2	3.10
15	"The Retrieval"	November 1, 2023	0.2	2.95
16	"Run with the Devil"	November 15, 2023	0.2	3.32
17	"Consciousness of Guilt"	December 6, 2023	0.2	2.93
18	"Extracurricular Activities"	December 13, 2023	0.2	2.82
19	"Ashes to Ashes"	January 3, 2024	0.1	3.80
20	"The Big Squeeze"	January 3, 2024	0.1	3.43
