= Tamayo Perry =

American actor and big wave surfer (1975–2024)

- Born: April 15, 1975; Oahu, Hawaii, US
- Died: June 23, 2024 (aged 49); Oahu, Hawaii, US
- Cause of death: Shark attack
- Occupations: Surfer, lifeguard and actor
- Years active: 1998–2024
- Known for: Pipeline surfer
- Works: Pirates of the Caribbean: On Stranger Tides; Hawaii Five-0
- Spouse: Emilia Perry (m. 2001)

Tamayo Perry (April 15, 1975 – June 23, 2024) was an American professional surfer, lifeguard, and actor. He was a regular fixture on Oahu's Banzai Pipeline, one of the world's most notable reef surf breaks, and was considered as one of the most prominent pipeline specialists of all time. His death was the first fatal shark attack on Oahu in over 20 years.

== Biography ==
Tamayo Perry was born in Hau'ula, on the island of Oahu, Hawaii, in 1975. He grew up around the corner from the North Shore's famous and deadly Banzai Pipeline, where he would become a regular presence and would go on to ride some of his most prominent waves.

Perry began surfing at the age of 12, and by 17 had travelled to California to take part in surfing competitions. He would go on to spend 15 years as a professional surfer.

In 1999 he won the Pipeline Master trials, coming in fourth the next year. He also travelled regularly to Tahiti to surf, where he competed in several installments of the Billabong Pro Teahupo'o competition, and filmed some of his most notable sports films, including Islands in the Stream.

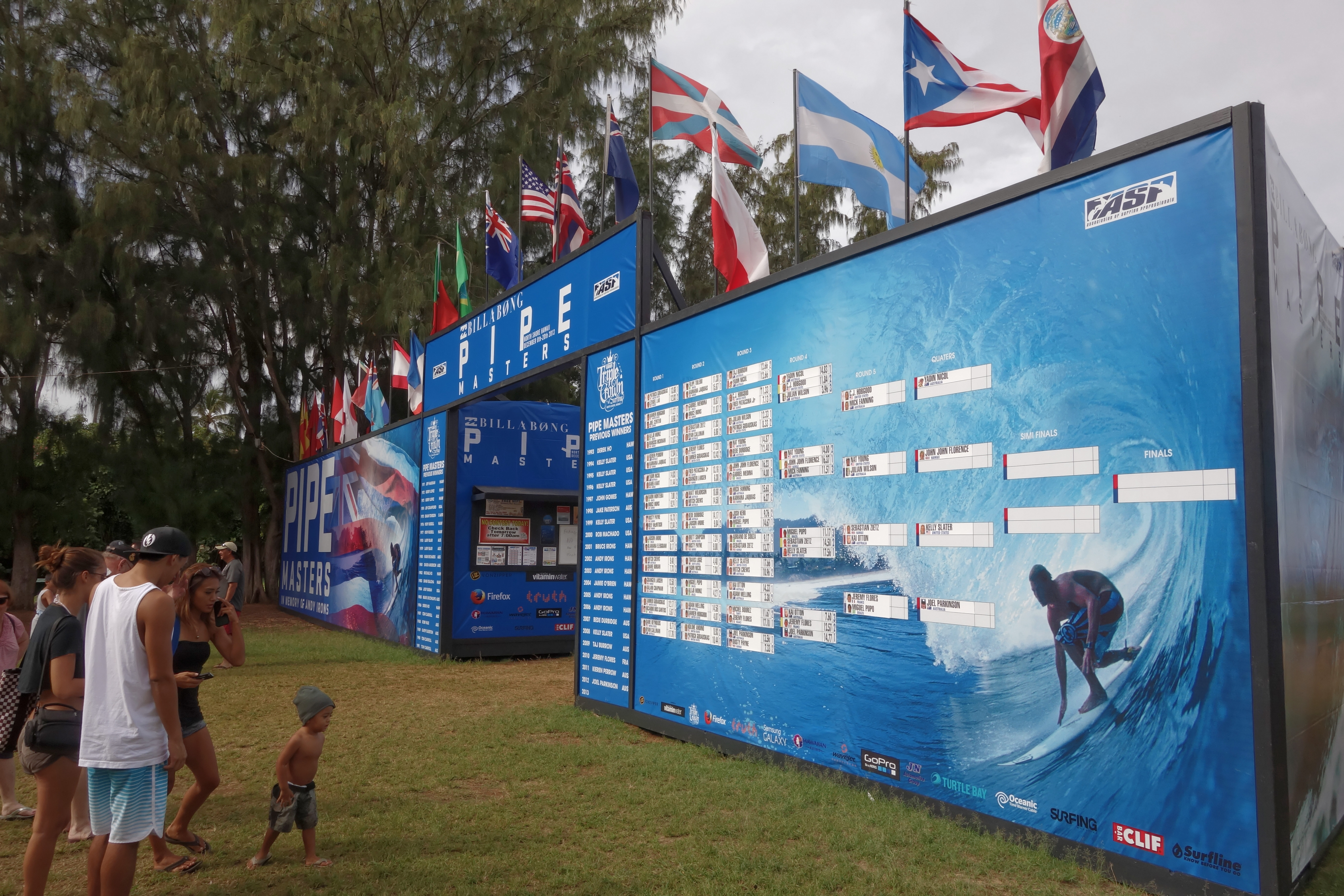
Oahu's Banzai Pipeline Masters event, where Perry competed

Outside competition he was known for his free-surfing and mastery of pipeline surfing, where he frequently appeared in surfing magazines and surf films.

Perry transitioned his on-camera experience in surfing films, notably with Walt Disney Studios as a surfing double in the film, as well as one of the title character's competitors, in the 1999 film Johnny Tsunami, and to wider audiences when he appeared in the 2002 film Blue Crush. In 2010, Tamayo Perry was one of six Hawaiian Queen Anne's Revenge crewmen cast by director Rob Marshall for the 2011 film Pirates of the Caribbean: On Stranger Tides. He also appeared in the episode Kai eʻe of the TV series Hawaii Five-O.

=== Injury and new career ===
In 2005 he suffered a near-fatal head injury at the Pipeline, when he was hit by another surfer's errant surfboard. The board caused an 8-inch gash in his scalp, and "peeled his skull from ear to ear", requiring nearly 50 staples to close the wound. The incident was widely reported, and alongside the fatal injury of Malik Joyeux that same year, was cited to encourage surfers to wear helmets when surfing reef breaks. Perry would continue to wear a helmet while surfing Pipeline after the accident.

After his recovery the experience encouraged him to start a career as a lifeguard, where he would be in a position to highlight the importance of surf etiquette and safety.

In 2016 he became a lifeguard for the City and County of Honolulu Ocean Safety. In 2020, he was involved in the rescue of Tomy Dragich, a Peruvian big-wave surfer who hit his head on his board and was knocked unconscious while surfing at Sunset Beach in Oahu.

His wife, Emilia Perry, is an Australian-born bodyboarder. The two ran the Oahu Surfing Experience, offering surfing lessons and also surfing together at various locations around the world, from rivers in England to Easter Island. He identified as a born-again Christian.

== Death ==
On June 23, 2024, Perry was attacked by a shark near Goat Island, while surfing off Oahu's North Shore. During the attack, he sustained fatal injuries, losing an arm and a leg. Lifeguards brought his body to shore using jetskis and he was pronounced dead by paramedics responding to the scene. He was 49.

== Filmography ==
=== Films ===
Year	Title	Role	Notes
1998	Next in Line	Himself	Surf film
1998	The Bomb	Himself	Surf film
2000	Revelation	Himself	Surf film
2002	All Aboard	Himself	Surf film
2002	Blue Crush	Tamayo	
2004	The Big Bounce	Stunt performer	
2004	Islands in the Stream	Surfer	Surf film
2004	Loaded Pipe	Himself	Surf film
2006	NU: Nalu Underground	Himself	Surf film by Quicksilver
2009	Beyond the Dream: The Joey Buran Story	Himself	Documentary
2009	The Arena: North Shore	Himself	Surf film
2010	Six Days in Paradise	Himself	
2011	Pirates of the Caribbean: On Stranger Tides	Buccaneer	Uncredited
2015	The Bridge	Manoa	Short film
2022	This Surfing Life: Big Wave Guardians	Himself	
2023	The Best One Ever	Himself	Sports film (final role)

=== Television ===
Year	Title	Role	Notes
2001	Primo Freerider	Himself	Surfing television series
2005	Firsthand	Himself	
2006	The Daily Habit	Himself	
2011	Hawaii Five-0	Spike	Episode: Kai eʻe
2012	Clean Break	Himself	Two episodes
