= Al Harrington (actor) =

American television actor (1935–2021)

- Born: Tausau Ta'a; December 12, 1935; Pago Pago, American Samoa
- Died: September 21, 2021 (aged 85); Honolulu, Hawaii, U.S.
- Occupation: Actor
- Children: 4

Al Harrington (born Tausau Ta'a; December 12, 1935 – September 21, 2021) was a Samoan-American actor. He is best known for his role as Detective Ben Kokua on television series Hawaii Five-O and as Mamo Kahike on its 2010 reboot. He had previously appeared in five episodes of the series as other characters.

== Biography ==
Al Harrington was born Tausau Ta'a on December 12, 1935, in Pago Pago, American Samoa. He was raised by his maternal grandmother in the village of Mapusaga in Pago Pago until he was three. His mother, Lela Suapaia, sent for him to join her while she was working as a nurse in Honolulu, Hawaii, USA. She later married Roy Milbur Harrington, a native of Iron Mountain, Michigan, who had come to Honolulu as a serviceman with the US Army. The elder Harrington later became a member of the Honolulu Police Department. However, it was not until Al Harrington's sophomore year in high school that he took his stepfather's last name.

He excelled at theater and American football at Punahou School, where he was a member of the class of 1954. He participated in several productions at the school while at the same time wowed people on the football field. He led his team to the league championships at Honolulu Stadium and was the first high school football All-American to come out of Hawaii.

Before transferring to Stanford University, Al attended Menlo College, a private business school location in Atherton, CA, from 1954 to 1955, where he was close friends with the soon to be Kingston Trio's Nick Reynolds ‘56 and Bob Shane ‘56. Al Harrington then went on to play for Stanford University, where he aspired to become a drama major. Unfortunately, there was some opposition to minority drama majors there. When he graduated in 1958 with a B.A. in History, the Baltimore Colts were interested in him. However, it did not offer the kind of money American professional football teams now offer, so he returned to Honolulu. Also, in order to pay for his tuition, he would work as a Polynesian dancer. It was this interesting occupation that led to an appearance on the game show To Tell the Truth.

On his return to Hawaii, Harrington would eventually work as a history teacher at Punahou and professor at the University of Hawaii. He also performed for many years as an entertainer in Waikiki, earning the well-known moniker of "The South Pacific Man". His popularity in the 1970s and 1980s made him a household name in Hawaii. He had a long running dance revue show, including Tahitian fire dancing, at the Hilton Hawaiian Village in Waikiki. And, along with other entertainers such as Don Ho, he helped define the entertainment industry in Hawaii, known to tourists and dignitaries alike from around the world.

Harrington was one of the few supporting cast members of Hawaii Five-O still alive, along with Sharon Farrell and Dennis Chun (also the son of Kam Fong, he had spot cameos). Harrington and Chun had recurring roles as Mamo Kahike and Sgt. Duke Lukela respectively in the 2010 reboot. He also appeared as Uncle John in three episodes of Doogie Kameāloha, M.D. on Disney+ in 2021.

Harrington died at 85 in Honolulu, Hawaii, on September 21, 2021, after suffering a massive stroke. He is survived by his wife, Rosa Harrington, sons Alema and Tau, daughters Summer Harrington and Cassi Harrington Palmer, and several grandchildren.

== Religion and family ==
Harrington was a member of The Church of Jesus Christ of Latter-day Saints. He had one of the lead parts in The Testaments, a film produced by the LDS Church. He also played the role of Thomas Trueblood in Light of the World, A Celebration of Life, that was put on by the LDS Church in Salt Lake City during the Olympics there in 2002.

Al's sons Alema and Tau Harrington both attended Punahou School and later played football at Brigham Young University.
