= Stephen Hill (actor) =

American actor (born 1976)

- Born: Stephen Hill; October 14, 1976 (age 50); New York, U.S.
- Occupation: Actor
- Years active: 2006–present

Stephen Hill (born October 14, 1976) is an American actor, best known for playing Theodore "T.C." Calvin in the rebooted version of the TV series Magnum P.I. from 2018 to 2024.

== Life and career ==
Hill was born in New York and raised in Willingboro, New Jersey.

He attended Hampton University in Hampton, Virginia, with a degree in Mass Media and Broadcasting. While in university he started modeling. After graduation he spent time in New York selling copiers, then turned to acting. He took acting lessons from Susan Batson, who had previously coached Nicole Kidman and Oprah Winfrey.

From 2009 to 2018 Hill acted in over two dozen movies and TV shows. He played in the 2018 Netflix miniseries Maniac, in the feature film Widows and in HBO’s Boardwalk Empire, among others.

In 2018, he was cast in the main role of Theodore "T.C." Calvin on the Hawaii-based CBS drama series Magnum P.I., which reprised the role played by Roger E. Mosley in the original 1980s series. The series ran for five seasons and 96 episodes from 2018 to 2024. Hill said he paid homage to Mosley in his work, particularly in season 5 after Mosley's death in 2022. The Honolulu Star-Advertiser described Hill as "natural and easy" in his portrayal of the role, and "hard to find fault in his fresh take on the classic television character." Hill was also active in volunteer work in Hawaii.

== Selected Filmography ==
Filmography credits from IMDb

=== Film ===
Year	Title	Role	Notes
2009	Pro-Black Sheep	Cashmere	
2013	Dead Man Down	Roland	
2014	An American in Hollywood	Kingston	
2014	Christmas Wedding Baby	Isaac	
2014	Draft Day	Robert Starks	
2015	Jack of the Red Hearts	Officer Mike	
2018	One Bedroom	Ted	
2018	Widows	Big Guy	
2020	Jesse	Marcus	
2023	The Color Purple	Henry "Buster" Broadnax	

=== Television ===
Year	Title	Role	Notes
2010-2012	12 Steps to Recovery	Blue Garner	8 episodes
2011	It's Always Sunny in Philadelphia	Traffic Officer	1 episode
2011-2018	Law and Order: Special Victims Unit	Glanville, Hospital Guard	2 episodes
2012	Fake Henrik Zetterberg	Roger Podactor	1 episode
2012	Political Animals	Omar	2 episodes
2012	Louie	Electronics Store Security Guard	1 episode
2013	Disciplinary Actions	Paul Bishop	1 episode
2014	Unforgettable	Teddy	1 episode
2014	Boardwalk Empire	Priest	3 episodes
2016	Blue Bloods	Det. Ted Foster	1 episode
2016	Luke Cage	Bert Hunter	1 episode
2018	Random Acts of Flyness	Tyeski Washington	1 episode
2018	Maniac	7	8 episodes
2018	Date.Love.Repeat.	Monty Everett	3 episodes
2018–24	Magnum P.I.	Theodore "T.C." Calvin	Main role, 96 episodes
2020	Hawaii Five-0	Theodore "T.C." Calvin	1 episode (crossover with Magnum P.I.)
2025	FBI	Simon Briggs	1 episode
