= Magnum P.I. (2018 TV series) =

American action drama television series

- Genre: Crime drama; Action
- Based on: Magnum, P.I. by: Donald P. Bellisario; Glen A. Larson
- Developed by: Peter M. Lenkov; Eric Guggenheim
- Showrunners: Peter M. Lenkov; Eric Guggenheim; Gene Hong
- Starring: Jay Hernandez; Perdita Weeks; Zachary Knighton; Stephen Hill; Amy Hill; Tim Kang
- Narrated by: Jay Hernandez
- Theme music composer: Mike Post; Pete Carpenter
- Composers: Brian Tyler; Keith Power
- Country of origin: United States
- Original language: English
- No. of seasons: 5
- No. of episodes: 96 (list of episodes)

Production
- Executive producers: John Davis; John Fox; Eric Guggenheim; Peter M. Lenkov; Justin Lin; Danielle Woodrow
- Producers: Craig Cannold; Jay Hernandez
- Cinematography: Stephen F. Windon; Krishna Rao; Rodney Charters; Spencer Combs; Ross Berryman; Kurt Jones
- Running time: 45 minutes
- Production companies: 101st Street Entertainment (Note: Seasons 1–2 only); Perfect Storm Entertainment; Davis Entertainment; Universal Television; CBS Studios (Note: Credited as CBS Television Studios in seasons 1–2.)

Original release
- Network: CBS
- Release: September 24, 2018 – May 6, 2022
- Network: NBC
- Release: February 19, 2023 – January 3, 2024

Related
- Magnum, P.I. (original series)

Magnum P.I. is an American action television series developed by Peter M. Lenkov and Eric Guggenheim. It stars Jay Hernandez as Thomas Magnum, the titular private investigator and former Navy SEAL who solves crimes in Hawaii. It is a reboot of the 1980–88 television series of the same name created by Donald P. Bellisario and Glen A. Larson. The series co-stars Perdita Weeks, Zachary Knighton, Stephen Hill, Amy Hill, and Tim Kang.

It was ordered to series in May 2018, and premiered on September 24, 2018, on CBS. On October 19, 2018, it was announced that the series had received a full season order from CBS. In April 2021, the series was renewed for a fourth season, which premiered on October 1, 2021. Despite being a Top 25 show in viewers, in May 2022, the series was canceled after four seasons, following CBS's failure to reach a new agreement with rights holders CBS Studios and Universal Television. On June 30, 2022, the series was picked up by NBC with a two-season, twenty-episode order, later clarified to be produced and broadcast as a two-part fifth season. The fifth season premiered on February 19, 2023. In June 2023, it was announced that the fifth season would be the final season. The series ended on January 3, 2024.

Magnum P.I. takes place in the same fictional universe as two other series, both also developed by Lenkov and both also reboots of earlier crime shows: Hawaii Five-0 and MacGyver. The three shows have been collectively referred to as the "Lenkov-verse". Initially, the series aired on Monday nights at 9:00 p.m., but aired its latter three CBS seasons on Friday nights in the same timeslot, immediately followed by Blue Bloods starring Tom Selleck, who portrayed the title character from the original series.

== Premise ==
Similar to the original series, Magnum P.I. revolves around the titular ex-United States Navy SEAL, Thomas Magnum, who occupies the guest house on Robin's Nest, the Hawaiian Estate owned by famous author Robin Masters. In exchange for allowing Magnum to live in his guest house, Masters writes a fictional book series about a "white knight" centered around Magnum's time in the military. In addition, Magnum works for Masters as a security consultant; despite this, Masters never appears in the series. Also living on the estate are Juliet Higgins, an ex-MI6 agent who serves as the estate's majordomo, and native Hawaiian Kumu Tuileta, who is the estate's cultural curator. Magnum's living arrangement gives him access to the guest house and Masters' Ferrari 488 Spider but does not come with a salary, so he solves crimes as a private investigator. His investigations often include Higgins, who officially joins him as his partner in the second season. The two are frequently assisted by ex-United States Marines, Orville "Rick" Wright and Theodore "T.C." Calvin. Rick is now a bar owner, while T.C. is a pilot whose main business is running helicopter tours of the islands. Gordon Katsumoto is a detective for the Honolulu Police Department (HPD) who frequently disagrees with Magnum's investigative methods, but nonetheless respects his crime-solving expertise.

Despite both having serious relationships throughout the first four seasons, Magnum and Higgins often share sexual tension with each other, which is finally addressed in the fourth season finale. Rick also finds himself in a serious relationship in the latter half of the series, leading to his girlfriend giving birth to their child. Meanwhile, the divorced Katsumoto often faces trouble with his son, and T.C. becomes a father figure to a homeless teenager in the fourth season.

The show shares a direct fictional universe with Hawaii Five-0. The six main characters of Magnum P.I. share many allies with the Five-0 Task Force, including further law enforcement professionals, confidential informants, and city employees.

== Cast ==
=== Main ===
- Jay Hernandez as Thomas Magnum, an ex-US Navy SEAL who is a security consultant and private investigator
- Perdita Weeks as Juliet Higgins, an ex-MI6 agent who is majordomo of Robin Masters' estate and Magnum's investigative partner
- Zachary Knighton as Orville "Rick" Wright, a retired Marine Sergeant who runs his own tiki bar
- Stephen Hill as Theodore "T.C." Calvin, a retired Marine Major and pilot who runs helicopter tours of Hawaii
- Amy Hill as Teuila "Kumu" Tuileta, the curator for the cultural center on Masters' estate
- Tim Kang as Gordon Katsumoto, a Honolulu Police Department detective

=== Recurring ===
- James Remar as Captain Buck Greene (seasons 2 and 5; guest season 1)
- Domenick Lombardozzi as Sebastian Nuzo (season 1; guest seasons 2 and 4)
- Corbin Bernsen as Francis "Icepick" Hofstetler (seasons 1–3)
- Christopher Thornton as Kenny "Shammy" Shamberg
- Bobby Lee as Jin Jeong (seasons 2–5)
- Betsy Phillips as Suzy Madison (season 3; guest seasons 2, 4 and 5)
- Jay Ali as Dr. Ethan Shah (season 3; guest season 4)
- Lance Lim as Dennis Katsumoto (season 3; guest seasons 4–5)
- Chantal Thuy as HPD Detective Lia Kaleo (season 4)
- Martin Martinez as Cade Jensen (seasons 4-5)
- Michael Delara as Gabriel Santos/M.E. Tech (season 4)
- Michael Rady as HPD Detective Chris Childs (season 5)
- Emily Alabi as Mahina (seasons 4-5)
- Rayan Lawrence as Neil (season 4)

=== Crossover characters from Hawaii Five-0 ===
- Kimee Balmilero as medical examiner Noelani Cunha (seasons 1–3)
- Taylor Wily as entrepreneur Kamekona Tupuola (seasons 1–2)
- Dennis Chun as HPD Sergeant Duke Lukela
- Shawn Mokuahi Garnett as Flippa (seasons 2–3)
- Kala Alexander as Kawika (season 1)
- Larry Manetti as Nicky "The Kid" DeMarco (season 2 and 5)
- William Forsythe as Private Investigator Harry Brown (season 2)
- Willie Garson as Gerard Hirsch (season 2)
- Beulah Koale as Officer Junior Reigns (season 2)
- Meaghan Rath as Officer Tani Rey (season 2)
- Katrina Law as Sergeant Quinn Liu (season 2)
- Ian Anthony Dale as Officer Adam Noshimuri (season 2)

== Episodes ==
Series overview for Magnum P.I.
Season	Episodes		Originally released			Average viewership (in millions)
Season	Episodes		First released	Last released	Network	Average viewership (in millions)
1	20		September 24, 2018	April 1, 2019	CBS	5.99
2	20	14	September 27, 2019	January 31, 2020	CBS	6.67
2	20	6	April 10, 2020	May 8, 2020	CBS	6.67
3	16		December 4, 2020	May 7, 2021	CBS	5.59
4	20		October 1, 2021	May 6, 2022	CBS	5.24
5	20	10	February 19, 2023	April 23, 2023	NBC	3.35
5	20	10	October 4, 2023	January 3, 2024	NBC	3.31

== Production ==
=== Development ===
In October 2017, CBS announced development of a reboot of Magnum, P.I. from Peter M. Lenkov, who also developed the 2010 reboot of Hawaii Five-O and the 2016 reboot of MacGyver. The network ordered a pilot production commitment for the series with Lenkov and Eric Guggenheim, a Hawaii Five-0 writer and co-showrunner, as developers. John Davis and John Fox of Davis Entertainment were reported as additional executive producers. CBS Television Studios and Universal Television co-produced the series. Danielle Woodrow was also later announced to be serving as an executive producer. The series was initially picked up by CBS for thirteen episodes, and an additional seven episodes were later ordered. On January 25, 2019, Magnum P.I. was renewed for a second season along with two other CBS freshman series. Lenkov returned for the second season as an executive producer and co-showrunner after signing a three-year deal with CBS Television Studios in 2018. Guggenheim also returned as executive producer and co-showrunner. It was later revealed that the second season would consist of twenty episodes.

On May 6, 2020, CBS renewed the series for a third season, along with eighteen other television shows. In July 2020, it was revealed that Lenkov would not have any involvement in the third season after being fired from CBS over toxic work environment allegations. He was originally expected to continue work on the series throughout the season as part of the previously signed deal. Lucas Till who portrays the title character of Angus MacGyver on MacGyver stated that Lenkov made him suicidal and constantly body shamed him. Lenkov's lawyers initially denied all allegations. Lenkov later responded to the situation by stating "It's difficult to hear that the working environment I ran was not the working environment my colleagues deserved, and for that, I am deeply sorry. I accept responsibility for what I am hearing and am committed to doing the work that is required to do better and be better." Lenkov still received writing credits for various episodes throughout the season written prior to his termination. Gene Hong replaced Lenkov as co-showrunner joining Guggenheim who continued working on the series. In October 2020 it was reported that the third season would have a reduced episode order of sixteen episodes as a result of the COVID-19 pandemic. On April 15, 2021, CBS renewed the series for a fourth season, which premiered on October 1, 2021.

=== Casting ===
On February 20, 2018, it was announced that Jay Hernandez had been cast as Thomas Magnum, who was portrayed by Tom Selleck in the original series. Perdita Weeks was cast as Juliet Higgins on March 2, 2018. The character of Higgins was genderswapped, from their 1980 counterpart Jonathan Higgins. Lenkov and Guggenheim stated that while they wanted to honour the original show it was important for the reboot to "stand on its own" and genderswapping allowed for differentiation. Zachary Knighton and Stephen Hill were later cast as Orville "Rick" Wright and Theodore "T.C." Calvin, respectively. Tim Kang and Amy Hill were the last two to be cast in the series, as Detective Gordon Katsumoto and Kumu, respectively.

Kimee Balmilero, Taylor Wily, and Dennis Chun all appeared as their Hawaii Five-0 characters throughout the first season. Chun guest starred on the original Magnum, P.I. as various minor characters throughout its run. Domenick Lombardozzi, Ken Jeong, and Christopher Thornton were cast in recurring roles. Actor and former football player Carl Weathers, MLB baseball player Christian Yelich, and NASCAR driver Ryan Blaney all appeared as guest stars. Betsy Phillips, series star Zachary Knighton's wife, first appeared in the second season's final episode.

Christopher Thornton continued to recur throughout the second, third, and fourth seasons. Bobby Lee was introduced as a new recurring character in the second season and also returned for guest appearances in the third and fourth. Numerous professional athletes appeared in guest roles throughout the second season, including Deontay Wilder, a World Boxing Council heavyweight champion; Aaron Donald and Andre Reed, National Football League players; Hans Hedemann, a competitive surfer; and Cowboy Cerrone, an Ultimate Fighting Championship mixed martial artist. Patrick Monahan, Skyler Grey, and Jerry Becker, appeared as themselves in season two and performed as their real world band Train.

Balmilero, Wily, and Chun also made appearances throughout the second season as their Hawaii Five-0 characters. Other Hawaii Five-0 actors new to the second season include series regulars Meaghan Rath, Katrina Law, Beulah Koale, and Ian Anthony Dale, all of whom appeared as their Hawaii Five-0 characters.

Larry Manetti and Roger E. Mosley, who co-starred in the original Magnum, P.I., made guest appearances on the reboot. However, Tom Selleck stated in an interview that he would never appear in the series, even though he was asked, so as not to take away from the original Magnum, P.I. and due to conflicting filming of Blue Bloods, which also airs on CBS.

On October 16, 2020, it was announced that Jay Ali had been cast in a recurring role for the third season as Dr. Ethan Shah. It was later revealed that Lance Lim would also recur in the third season. Mosley again returned as a guest star in the third season. Balmilero, Chun, and Garnett from Hawaii Five-0 continued appearances in the third season despite Hawaii Five-0's cancellation.

Chantal Thuy joined the cast in a recurring capacity for the fourth season. Thuy portrayed Lia Kaleo, an HPD detective and partner to Katsumoto, as well as a love interest to Magnum. Martin Martinez also joined the recurring cast for the fourth season portraying Cade Jensen, a trouble teenager searching for a job. Chun appeared once more in the fourth season. Ahead of the fifth season Michael Rady was cast in a recurring role to portray Detective Chris Childs.

=== Filming ===
The pilot episode filmed in March and April 2018 at Hawaii Film Studio. It was directed by Justin Lin, who also directed other CBS pilots. The rest of the first season began filming on July 23, 2018, with a traditional Hawaiian blessing. Filming for the series takes place in the state of Hawaii on the island of O'ahu at Kalaeloa Studio. The fictional Robin's Nest Estate where Magnum and Higgins lives is located at Kualoa Ranch, a location which Jurassic World also used as a filming location. Other filming locations include numerous beaches, such as Maili, Waikiki, and Kapolei. A central theme of the original series was Magnum's constant use of a Ferrari, which has become a cultural icon inextricably linked to the series. Then Magnum almost exclusively favored the Ferrari 308 GTS, such that it was briefly shown in the pilot episode. The production team, however, updated his favored vehicle to a Ferrari 488 Spider. Both cars are a mid-engine, rear-wheel-drive, 2-seat, roadster variant of the current V8 Ferrari.

Filming for the second season also began with a traditional Hawaiian blessing on July 8, 2019. A new filming location in the second season is the La Mariana Restaurant, an operating Tiki Bar in Hawaii. Delayed by the COVID-19 pandemic, filming for the third season began on September 16, 2020. COVID-19 protocols were required on set including masks, social distancing, COVID testing, and reduced cast and crew on set. Fourth season filming commenced on July 20, 2021, with many COVID-19 precautions still in place. The fourth season also introduced new crew members to production after a number of those who worked on previous seasons transferred to work on NCIS: Hawaiʻi.

=== Cancellation and revival ===
On May 12, 2022, CBS canceled the series after four seasons. Cancellation of the series had negative effects on Hawaii's film industry, leaving 350–400 people without employment. However, on May 23, 2022, it was reported by TVLine that Universal Television was trying to shop the series around. Ten days later, Deadline Hollywood reported that talks were underway for Universal to carry the series in-house via NBC and/or USA. Such a move would have required a deal with CBS Studios by June 30, 2022, when the cast members' options on their contracts ended. Although not officially renewed, Production Weekly reported a fifth season to be in "active development", though with no network attached to the listing. On June 30, 2022, NBC officially picked up the series for 20 episodes, initially to be split over two 10-episode seasons, with the option for more episodes. At the time, it was reported that all six cast members were expected to return, along with the executive producers, and CBS Studios and Universal TV would continue to co-produce the series. On July 4, 2022, it was reported by TVLine that production on the fifth season would begin in late 2022, with the season not likely to premiere until January 2023 at the earliest. Filming for the fifth season began on September 19, 2022. The fifth season premiered on February 19, 2023. It was later clarified that the twenty episodes would be split as a two-part fifth season rather than into two separate seasons. On June 23, 2023, it was announced that the fifth season would be the final season. On December 15, 2023, it was revealed that the fifth season would finish with a two-hour series finale on January 3, 2024.

== Streaming ==
Magnum P.I. was added to Amazon Freevee on September 1, 2023.

== Reception ==
=== Critical response ===
Magnum P.I. has been met with mixed reviews. On review aggregation website Rotten Tomatoes, the first season holds an approval rating of 57% with an average rating of 6.35/10, based on 21 reviews. The website's critical consensus reads, "The rebooted Magnum P.I. may not be quite distinctive enough to hold up to comparisons with its source material, but a charismatic star, slickly staged action, and a handful of modern twists hint at greater potential." Metacritic, which uses a weighted average, assigned the first season a score of 48 out of 100 based on 18 critics, indicating "mixed or average reviews".

=== Ratings ===
Viewership and ratings per season of Magnum P.I.
Season	Timeslot (ET)	Network	Episodes	First aired		Last aired		TV season	Viewership rank	Avg. viewers (millions)
Season	Timeslot (ET)	Network	Episodes	Date	Viewers (millions)	Date	Viewers (millions)	TV season	Viewership rank	Avg. viewers (millions)
1	Monday 9:00 p.m.	CBS	20	September 24, 2018	8.12	April 1, 2019	5.54	2018–19	37	8.36
2	Friday 9:00 p.m.	CBS	20	September 27, 2019	6.40	May 8, 2020	6.09	2019–20	26	8.91
3	Friday 9:00 p.m.	CBS	16	December 4, 2020	5.50	May 7, 2021	5.00	2020–21	24	7.48
4	Friday 9:00 p.m.	CBS	20	October 1, 2021	5.23	May 6, 2022	5.06	2021–22	24	7.34
5	Sunday 9:00 p.m. (1, 3–10); Sunday 10:00 p.m. (2); Wednesday 9:00 p.m. (11–19); Wednesday 10:00 p.m. (20)	NBC	20	February 19, 2023	3.87	January 3, 2024	3.43	2022–23; 2023–24	TBD	TBD
