= Kam Fong Chun =

American actor (1918–2002)

- Born: Kam Tong Chun; May 27, 1918; Kalihi, Territory of Hawaii
- Died: October 18, 2002 (aged 84); Honolulu, Hawaii, U.S.
- Occupations: Police officer, actor
- Years active: 1958–1997
- Spouses: Esther N. Chun (m. 1938; died 1944) Gladys Lindo (m. 1949)
- Children: 6, including Dennis Chun

Kam Fong Chun (born Kam Tong Chun; May 27, 1918 – October 18, 2002) was an American police officer and actor, best known for his role as Chin Ho Kelly, a police detective on the CBS television network series Hawaii Five-O.

== Life ==
Kam Fong Chun was born in the Kalihi neighborhood of Honolulu, Hawaii. A 1938 graduate of President William McKinley High School, he worked at Pearl Harbor shipyard in his 20s as a boiler maker and was a witness to the attack by the Japanese on December 7, 1941. After the death of his first wife and two eldest children in 1944, he applied for a job as a police officer at the Honolulu Police Department. He served there for 16 years. After his retirement from the police force, he worked as a disc jockey and sold real estate in addition to doing community theater.

Chun's life was filled with tragedies. His father had an affair, which led to his parents' divorce and the splitting of the family. The two eldest children went with their father and the younger five, including seven-year-old Chun, lived with their mother. The affair also led to Chun's father being forced out of the family business by his paternal grandfather, which left the family in poverty. Chun watched a brother burn to death as he was painting the family home and someone lit a match. On June 8, 1944, Chun lost his family in a freak air disaster that devastated their home in Honolulu. Two B-24 bombers collided over the Chun residence, killing wife Esther, four-year-old daughter Marilyn and two-year-old son Donald.

Chun later married Gladys Lindo in 1949. They had two sons, Dennis and Dickson, and daughters, Brenda and Valerie.

=== Stage name ===
Chun's stage name came from a misunderstanding of his first name by his first teacher, who taught him to write Kam Fong Chun instead of his birth name, Kam Tong Chun. Due to confusion as he got older, he later legalized his name to the former. CBS asked him to shorten his name to Kam Fong when he was hired for Hawaii Five-O.

=== Proposed 1997 Five-O revival ===
Talk had centered around a remake or a feature film version of the show for years. In 1997, CBS and Stephen J. Cannell (The Rockford Files, Baretta, The Commish) collaborated on a pilot for a possible new Five-O series. The pilot would introduce some of the new cast and feature former regulars from the original series, including Fong. According to Five-O fan and author of a book on the show, Karen Rhodes, Fong was asked to reprise his role and appear in the pilot. Neither Fong nor any of the other regulars told Cannell that Chin Ho had been killed off at the end of the tenth season. This was only discovered after all of Fong's scenes had been shot, and to excise him from the project would have caused delays and overruns in cost. Hoping that CBS executives would not remember the one episode out of hundreds, Cannell screened the pilot.

His son Dennis Chun had a recurring role in the 2010 reboot as HPD Sgt. Duke Lukela. Beginning with the 8th season he was promoted to a series regular.

=== Death ===
Kam Fong Chun died from lung cancer on October 18, 2002, at the age of 84.

== Filmography ==
- Ghost of the China Sea (1958) — Pvt. Hakashima
- The Lost Missile (1958) — Chinese Officer (uncredited)
- Cry for Happy (1961) — Chin, Sailor (uncredited)
- Gidget Goes Hawaiian (1961) — Hotel Night Clerk (uncredited)
- Seven Women from Hell (1961) — Burly Guard (uncredited)
- Diamond Head (1962) — Loe Kim Lee (uncredited)
- Hawaii Five-O (1968–1978) — Det. Chin Ho Kelly
- Magnum, P.I. (1982–1985) — Kanki / Kam Chung
- Goodbye Paradise (1991) — Old man Yung
- Hawaii Five-O (1997) — Det. Chin Ho Kelly (final film role)
