= Hawaii Five-0 (2010 TV series) =

American police procedural series

- Genre: Police procedural; Action drama
- Based on: Hawaii Five-O by Leonard Freeman
- Developed by: Peter M. Lenkov; Alex Kurtzman; Roberto Orci
- Showrunners: Peter M. Lenkov; Eric Guggenheim; David Wolkove; Matt Wheeler
- Starring: Alex O'Loughlin; Scott Caan; Daniel Dae Kim; Grace Park; Taryn Manning; Masi Oka; Lauren German; Michelle Borth; Chi McBride; Jorge Garcia; Meaghan Rath; Taylor Wily; Dennis Chun; Kimee Balmilero; Beulah Koale; Ian Anthony Dale; Katrina Law
- Theme music composer: Morton Stevens; Brian Tyler
- Opening theme: "Hawaii Five-O Theme" by Brian Tyler
- Ending theme: Same as above
- Composers: Brian Tyler; Keith Power
- Country of origin: United States
- Original language: English
- No. of seasons: 10
- No. of episodes: 240 (list of episodes)

Production
- Executive producers: Peter M. Lenkov; Alex Kurtzman; Roberto Orci; Eric Guggenheim; David Wolkove; Matt Wheeler
- Producers: Peter M. Tassler; Alex O'Loughlin; Scott Caan
- Production locations: Oahu, Hawaii
- Cinematography: Krishna Rao; Michael Martinez
- Editors: Rodrick Davis; John Pensky; Casey Rohrs
- Running time: 42–44 minutes
- Production companies: K/O Paper Products; 101st Street Entertainment; CBS Studios (Note: Credited as CBS Productions (2010–2012) and CBS Television Studios (2012–2020))

Original release
- Network: CBS
- Release: September 20, 2010 – April 3, 2020

Related
- Hawaii Five-O (1968 series)

Hawaii Five-0 is an American police procedural drama television series developed for CBS by Roberto Orci, Alex Kurtzman and Peter M. Lenkov. It is a reboot of the 1968–1980 series (the original series had the letter "O" in its title; the 2010 series has the number zero), which also aired on CBS. The series starred Alex O'Loughlin and Scott Caan and centers around a fictional special police major crimes task force operating at the behest of the governor of Hawaii. It was produced by K/O Paper Products and 101st Street Television, initially in association with CBS Studios. The series premiered on September 20, 2010, airing for ten seasons, with the finale airing on April 3, 2020.

Alongside O'Loughlin and Caan, the cast originally consisted of Daniel Dae Kim and Grace Park, both of whom left after season seven. Other cast mates included Taryn Manning, Masi Oka, Lauren German, Michelle Borth, Chi McBride, Jorge Garcia, Meaghan Rath, Taylor Wily, Dennis Chun, Kimee Balmilero, Beulah Koale, Ian Anthony Dale and Katrina Law. The series aired on Mondays for its first three seasons. Beginning with season four, the program was moved to Fridays.

The series takes place in the same fictional universe with fellow reboot series MacGyver and Magnum P.I., both of which were also developed by Peter M. Lenkov. The three shows have been collectively referred to as the "Lenkov-verse", and Hawaii Five-0 had crossover episodes with both of the others. The series also exists in the same fictional universe as the NCIS franchise by way of a crossover event with NCIS: Los Angeles.

Hawaii Five-0 received praise for its modern take on the original series, and was a solid ratings performer for CBS at the time of its release. The series received several award nominations including a Golden Globe Award for Best Supporting Actor – Series, Miniseries or Television Film for Caan, and three Teen Choice Awards for Choice TV Action Show, Choice TV Action Actor for Dae Kim and Choice TV Action Actress for Park. In addition, the series also made a positive effect on the Hawaii economy.

== Premise ==
The series covers the actions of the Hawaii Five-0 Task Force, a fictional small, specialized Hawaii Department of Public Safety major crimes task force headed by former United States Navy SEAL Lieutenant Commander Steve McGarrett (United States Navy Reserve). The task force answers only to the Governor of Hawaii and is given full immunity and means. The task force has no restrictions and is always backed by the Governor. The team is able to investigate crimes ranging from terrorism to kidnapping as well as murder and robberies.

Steve McGarrett recruits Honolulu Police Department Detective-Sergeant Danny "Danno" Williams as his partner and unofficial second in command of the team. He fills out the team by recruiting ex-HPD Detective-Lieutenant Chin Ho Kelly, his father's protégé, and Chin's cousin, Officer Kono Kalakaua, a rookie HPD officer. Department of Homeland Security Special Agent Lori Weston is also assigned to the team later on, although she is later forced to return to the DHS by the Governor. They are assisted by Dr. Max Bergman, a medical examiner for the City and County of Honolulu. Steve later adds Captain Lou Grover, a HPD SWAT commander and a transfer from the Chicago Police Department, Special Consultant Jerry Ortega, Chin's high school classmate, a conspiracy theorist and a consultant for the task force, and for a brief time, Lieutenant Catherine Rollins, Steve's girlfriend and ex-US Navy Office of Naval Intelligence. Following Max, Chin, and Kono's departures, Max is replaced by medical examiner Dr. Noelani Cunha, and McGarrett fills in Chin and Kono's spots by hiring high-achieving HPD academy washout Tani Rey and ex-US Navy SEAL Special Warfare Operator Second Class-turned-Police Candidate Junior Reigns. Later on, Kono's husband Adam Noshimuri joins the task force following the couple's divorce, and shortly after Jerry's departure, United States Army CID Staff Sergeant Quinn Liu is recruited in his place. The team is also assisted by confidential informant Kamekona Tupuola, and HPD liaison Sergeant Duke Lukela.

== Cast and characters ==
=== Main ===
Full cast of Hawaii Five-0 seasons 8 and 9 from left to right: Jorge Garcia as Special Consultant Jerry Ortega, Chi McBride as Captain Lou Grover, Beulah Koale as Police Candidate Junior Reigns, Meghan Rath as Officer Tani Rey, Scott Caan as Detective Danny "Danno" Williams, Alex O'Loughlin as Lieutenant Commander Steve McGarrett, Ian Anthony Dale as Adam Noshimuri, Kimee Balmilero as Medical Examiner Dr. Noelani Cunha, Dennis Chun as Sergeant Duke Lukela, and Taylor Wily as Kamekona Tupola

- Alex O'Loughlin as Lieutenant Commander Steve McGarrett, USNR. A decorated former Navy SEAL, Steve McGarrett is head of the Five-0 Task Force and son of retired HPD Sergeant John McGarrett. John's murder and storyline forms the premise of Steve's return to Hawaii and the formation of the Task Force.
- Scott Caan as Detective Sergeant Danny Williams. He is a divorced single father who transferred from Newark PD in New Jersey to be with his daughter and is the de facto second-in-command of Five-0.
- Daniel Dae Kim as Detective Lieutenant Chin Ho Kelly, (seasons 1–7). A veteran HPD detective, he was John McGarrett's former rookie and provides technical expertise and local know-how. During the season 7 finale, Chin is offered the lead position of the Five-0 Task Force established in San Francisco, which he later accepts. This was written into the show after Kim departed the series in late June 2017 prior to the start of production of the eighth season due to a salary dispute with CBS. Kim had been seeking pay equality with fellow cast members Alex O'Loughlin and Scott Caan, but CBS's final offer to Kim was 10–15% lower than what O'Loughlin and Caan made in salary.
- Grace Park as Officer Kono Kalakaua, (seasons 1–7). A former surfer, she was personally recruited by Steve McGarrett while still in her final days at the HPD Academy. She is the cousin of Lieutenant Kelly, and later becomes the wife of Adam Noshimuri. In the conclusion of the season 7 finale, Kono is seen aboard a flight to Carson City, Nevada, where it is later revealed she has since joined a task force aimed at combating sex trafficking. This was written into the show following Park's departure from the series in late June 2017 prior to the start of production of the eighth season due to a salary dispute with CBS. Park had been seeking pay equality with stars Alex O'Loughlin and Scott Caan, but CBS's final offer to Park was 10–15% lower than what O'Loughlin and Caan made in salary.
- Taryn Manning as Mary Ann McGarrett, (season 1; guest seasons 2–4, 6 & 9) Steve's younger sister who lives in Los Angeles and occasionally visits Hawaii. At the beginning of the series she and Steve are largely estranged from each other, but as time goes on gradually begin to make amends. Mary works various odd jobs including flight attendant and caregiver before adopting a baby girl whom she names Joan (later nicknamed 'Joanie') after their father.
- Masi Oka as Dr. Max Bergman (seasons 2–7; recurring season 1; guest season 10), the eccentric and well-respected County of Honolulu medical examiner. He departs the series midway through season 7 upon joining Doctors without Borders in Africa.
- Lauren German as Special Agent Lori Weston (season 2; guest season 2). A senior DHS agent assigned to Five-0 to provide oversight.
- Michelle Borth as Lieutenant Catherine Rollins, USNR (seasons 3–4; recurring seasons 1 & 6; guest seasons 2, 5 & 7–10). A former Navy Intelligence officer and McGarrett's girlfriend.
- Chi McBride as Captain Lou Grover, (seasons 4–10; guest season 4). A transfer from Chicago PD who has two children with his wife Renée.
- Jorge Garcia as Special Consultant Jerry Ortega (seasons 5–10; recurring season 4), a conspiracy theorist who assisted Five-0 during several investigations and was eventually hired as a "consultant".
- Meaghan Rath as Officer Tani Rey (seasons 8–10), whom McGarrett recruits from her job as a hotel pool lifeguard after being kicked out of the police academy, despite being a first-rate candidate. She initially declines to join but later becomes a team member.
- Taylor Wily as Kamekona Tupuola (seasons 8–10; recurring seasons 1–7), a rehabilitated ex-convict, turned entrepreneur and owner of the Waiola Shave Ice, Kamekona's Shrimp Truck, and Kamekona's Helicopter Tours. He is a CI for the Five-0 Task Force and their friend.
- Dennis Chun as Sergeant Duke Lukela (seasons 8–10; recurring seasons 1–7), HPD officer who often acts as a liaison to Five-0. He was one of the few HPD cops who was not antagonistic towards Danny or the other Five-0 members from the beginning, as he was colleagues with Steve's father and also personally knew Chin and Kono's family. In "Hookman", he was shot by Curt Stoner (Peter Weller), but survived and recovered. Dennis Chun is the son of Kam Fong Chun, who played Chin Ho Kelly in the original series.
- Kimee Balmilero as Dr. Noelani Cunha (seasons 8–10; recurring season 7), a medical examiner who took over to assist the team after Max's departure. She is often seen joining in with the team during holidays and celebrations.
- Beulah Koale as Officer Junior Reigns (seasons 8–10), a former Navy SEAL ranked Special Warfare Operator Second Class who asks McGarrett, a fellow SEAL, for a job. Initially turned down he returns to McGarrett a second time. McGarrett later introduces him to Duke Lukela and informs him that before becoming a member of Five-0 he will need to join and finish the police academy.
- Ian Anthony Dale as Adam Noshimuri (seasons 8–10; recurring seasons 2–7), a member of the Five-0 Task Force; formerly the Head of Five-0 Task Force Special Division of Organized Crime; Kono's ex-husband, and a confidential informant to Five-0.
- Katrina Law as Sergeant Quinn Liu (season 10), a former staff sergeant with Army CID demoted for insubordination.

=== Recurring ===
- Teilor Grubbs as Grace Williams (seasons 1–7, 9-10).
- William Sadler as John McGarrett (seasons 1–10)
- Mark Dacascos as Wo Fat (seasons 1–5, 9, 10).
- Will Yun Lee as Sang Min Soo (seasons 1–3, 5–7).
- Al Harrington as Mamo Kahike (seasons 1–2, 4–7, 9).
- Claire van der Boom as Rachel Edwards/Hollander (seasons 1–2, 5, 7–9).
- Brian Yang as HPD forensic scientist Charles "Charlie" Fong (seasons 1–5).
- Kala Alexander as Kawika (seasons 1–6)
- Reiko Aylesworth as Dr. Malia Waincroft (seasons 1–4).
- James Marsters as Victor Hesse (seasons 1–2, 5).
- Jean Smart as Governor Patricia "Pat" Jameson (season 1).
- Kelly Hu as Laura Hills (season 1).
- Terry O'Quinn as Joe White (seasons 2–10)
- Autumn Reeser as Dr. Gabrielle "Gabby" Asano (seasons 2–4).
- Richard T. Jones as Governor Sam Denning (seasons 2–4).
- William Baldwin as Frank Delano (seasons 2–3).
- Tom Sizemore as Captain Vince Fryer (season 2).
- Shawn Mokuahi-Garnett as Shawn "Flippa" Tupuola . (season 3–10).
- Shawn Anthony Thomsen as Officer Pua Kai (season 3–9).
- Duane "Dog" Chapman as himself. (season 3–10).
- Andrew Lawrence as Eric Russo (seasons 3, 6–9).
- Christine Lahti as Doris McGarrett (seasons 3–10)
- Justin Bruening as Lieutenant Commander William "Billy" Harrington (seasons 3–4).
- Daniel Henney as Michael Noshimuri (season 3).
- Nick Jonas as Ian Wright (season 4)
- Michelle Hurd as Renee Grover (seasons 4–6, 8–10).
- Paige Hurd as Samantha Grover (seasons 4–6, 8).
- Lili Simmons as Amber Vitale / Melissa Armstrong (seasons 4–7).
- Christopher Sean as Gabriel Waincroft (seasons 4–6).
- Carol Burnett as Deb McGarrett (seasons 4–6)
- Melanie Griffith as Clara Williams (seasons 4–6).
- Joey Defore and Zach Sulzbach as Charlie Williams (season 5–10).
- Kekoa Kekumano as Nahele Huikala (season 5–9).
- Willie Garson as Gerard Hirsch (seasons 5–10).
- Amanda Setton as Dr. Mindy Shaw (season 5).
- Michael Imperioli as Odell Martin (seasons 5, 6, and 8)
- Mirrah Foulkes as Ellie Clayton (season 5).
- Chosen Jacobs as Will Grover (season 6–9).
- Michelle Krusiec as Michelle Shioma (seasons 6–8).
- Julie Benz as Detective Abby Dunn (seasons 6–7).
- Londyn Silzer as Sara Diaz (seasons 6–7).
- Sarah Carter as Lynn Downey (seasons 6–7).
- Ingo Rademacher as Robert Coughlin (seasons 6–7).
- Claire Forlani as Alicia Brown (season 7–8).
- Chris Vance as Commander Harry Langford (season 7–10).
- Kunal Sharma as Koa Rey (season 8–9).
- Christine Ko as Jessie Nomura (season 8).
- Rochelle Aytes as Agent Greer (season 9).
- Larry Manetti as Nicky "The Kid" DeMarco (seasons 3–6)
- Presilah Nunez as Dr. Okino (season 10)

=== Crossover characters ===
- Daniela Ruah as Kensi Blye (season 2)
- LL Cool J as Sam Hanna (season 2)
- Chris O'Donnell as G. Callen (season 2)
- Craig Robert Young as Dracul Comescu (season 2)
- Jay Hernandez as Thomas Magnum (season 10)
- Perdita Weeks as Juliet Higgins (season 10)
- Zachary Knighton as Orville "Rick" Wright (season 10)
- Stephen Hill as Theodore "TC" Calvin (season 10)

=== Notable guest stars ===
Among notable guests who made an appearance on show are comedian Dane Cook, actors Monica Barbaro, Norman Reedus, Balthazar Getty, Josh Dallas, Greg Germann, Ed Asner, James Remar, Robert Englund, Tom Berenger, James Caan, Patty Duke, Lewis Tan, Peter Fonda, Michael Madsen, Daryl Hannah, Bronson Pinchot, Craig T. Nelson, Robert Loggia, Kevin Sorbo, Adam Beach, Corbin Bernsen, Rebecca De Mornay, Jeff Fahey, Bruce Davison, Tim Daly, Gail O'Grady, Nathan Kress, Sung Kang, Pruitt Taylor Vince, Tony Curran, Bai Ling, Rick Springfield, Tom Arnold, Jon Lovitz, George Takei, Treat Williams, Peter Weller, Terrence Howard, Joan Collins, Cloris Leachman, Lance Gross, Joey Lawrence and Chuck Norris, athletes Michelle Wie, Clarissa Chun, Martellus Bennett, Eric Dickerson, Jerry Rice, Michael Bennett and Metta World Peace, models Jasmine Tookes, Jacquelyn Jablonski, Behati Prinsloo and Kendall Jenner, and musicians Jimmy Buffett, Sean "Diddy" Combs, Nas, Nick Jonas, Xzibit, JoJo and Patrick Monahan.

== Episodes ==
Season	Episodes	Originally released		Rank	Rating	Average viewership (in millions)
Season	Episodes	First released	Last released	Rank	Rating	Average viewership (in millions)
1	24	September 20, 2010	May 16, 2011	22	7.5	11.26
2	23	September 19, 2011	May 14, 2012	26	7.6	11.83
3	24	September 24, 2012	May 20, 2013	35	6.8	10.36
4	22	September 27, 2013	May 9, 2014	21	7.5	11.66
5	25	September 26, 2014	May 8, 2015	20	7.8	12.28
6	25	September 25, 2015	May 13, 2016	25	7.0	11.04
7	25	September 23, 2016	May 12, 2017	15	7.6	12.15
8	25	September 29, 2017	May 18, 2018	18	6.8	11.00
9	25	September 28, 2018	May 17, 2019	26	6.2	10.01
10	22	September 27, 2019	April 3, 2020	20	9.7	7.19

=== Crossovers ===
Note: The table below only accounts for full crossover events—single guest appearances are not included.

Crossover between		Episode(s)	Type	Actors crossing over	Date aired
Series A	Series B	Episode(s)	Type	Actors crossing over	Date aired
Hawaii Five-0	NCIS: Los Angeles	"Pa Make Loa" (Hawaii Five-0 2.21) "Touch of Death" (NCIS: Los Angeles 3.21)	Two-part crossover	Appearing in Series A: Chris O'Donnell, LL Cool J, Craig Robert Young; Appearing in Series B: Scott Caan, Daniel Dae Kim	April 30, 2012 – May 1, 2012
Main article: Touch of Death (crossover event) Agents Sam Hanna and G. Callen of the NCIS OSP in Los Angeles are called in to assist Five-0 finding a suspect, Dracul Comescu. Later, Callen and Sam must return to Los Angeles to stop a possible smallpox outbreak from becoming a reality with Danny "Danno" Williams and Chin Ho Kelly coming along to help.
MacGyver	Hawaii Five-0	"Flashlight" (MacGyver 1.18)	One-part crossover	Appearing in Series A: Daniel Dae Kim, Grace Park, Taylor Wily	March 10, 2017
Main article: Flashlight (MacGyver) MacGyver's Phoenix Foundation team gets rerouted to Hawaii after a 7.2 magnitude earthquake hits the coast of Hawaii. While aiding Detective Chin Ho Kelly and Officer Kono Kalakaua, they also have to deal with Chinese intelligence soldiers who use the earthquake to steal top-secret weaponry that the scientists are currently developing.
Hawaii Five-0	Magnum P.I.	"Ihea 'oe i ka wa a ka ua e loku ana?" (Hawaii Five-0 10.12) "Desperate Measures" (Magnum P.I. 2.12)	Two-part crossover	Appearing in Series A: Jay Hernandez, Perdita Weeks, Zachary Knighton, Stephen Hill Appearing in Series B: Beulah Koale, Meaghan Rath, Katrina Law	January 3, 2020
Main article: Hawaii Five-0 and Magnum P.I. crossover While the Five-0 Task Force take up the case of a stolen list of undercover CIA agents, they cross paths with Thomas Magnum and Juliet Higgins who are investigating the same case. Soon after, Junior Reigns is kidnapped as leverage for the criminals to get the list back, leading to Magnum's team helping Tani Rey and Quinn Liu in a search-and-rescue mission.

== Production ==
=== History ===
The idea to bring Hawaii Five-O back to television had been under consideration well before the 2010 version was announced. The first attempt was a one-hour pilot for a new series that was made in 1996 but never aired, although a few clips were found years later and are available online. Produced and written by Stephen J. Cannell, it was intended to star Gary Busey and Russell Wong as the new Five-0 team. Original cast member James MacArthur briefly returned as Dan Williams, this time as governor of Hawaii, with cameos made by other former Five-O regulars. Another attempt was made to turn the project into a film by Warner Bros. but that also was scrapped.

On August 12, 2008, CBS announced that it would bring Hawaii Five-O back to the network schedule for the 2009–10 television season. The new version would be an updated present-day sequel, this time centering on Steve McGarrett, who succeeds his late father Steve (Jack Lord's character in the original series) as the head of the unit. Edward Allen Bernero, executive producer and showrunner of Criminal Minds, was to helm the new take, which he described as "Hawaii Five-O, version 2.0". It was also to incorporate most of the iconic elements from the original, including the "Book 'em, Danno" catchphrase, into the remake. Bernero, who was a fan of the original, and had a ring tone of the series' theme song on his cell phone, had always wanted to bring the series back to TV.

In October 2009, it was announced that Alex Kurtzman and Roberto Orci had signed on to script a pilot episode, and that Peter M. Lenkov would serve as the series showrunner. Kurtzman and Orci decided to reboot the original concept similar to their work on the 2009 Star Trek film, rather than a sequel to the original series. Production on the pilot was shot in and around Honolulu in March 2010.

On May 17, 2010, the Hawaii Five-O remake was picked up by CBS, which scheduled it for Monday nights in the 10–11 p.m. time slot. The news was good for the state of Hawaii, which hoped that the remake would pump new life into the economy. Production of the remainder of the first season started in June 2010. On June 24, 2010, the producers announced that it would use the warehouse at the former Honolulu Advertiser building as the official soundstage studio for the series starting in July 2010. Exteriors representing Five-0 headquarters in the series are located at the Ali'iolani Hale in Honolulu, directly across the street from Iolani Palace, which represented Five-O headquarters in the original series.

On October 21, 2010, CBS announced that the first season had been given a full season order of 24 episodes. Subsequent seasons have consisted of between 23 and 25 episodes.

This revival series uses a zero as the last character in its title instead of the letter "O" that is used in the title of the original series. According to Los Angeles Times, a CBS insider said that the disambiguation was necessary because of search engine results. When Variety conducted its own search engine test on Google, it found that Hawaii Five-0 (with the zero) had 263,000 results while Hawaii Five-O (with the letter O) had over 1.7 million.

Online voting by viewers determined the ending of the January 14, 2013 episode "Kapu" ("Forbidden"), with two zones, Eastern and Central Time Zones, and Mountain and Pacific Time Zones, each getting their own result. Each alternative ending could be seen online after the episode aired.

On February 28, 2020, it was announced that the series would end after 10 seasons and 240 episodes with a two-episode series finale on April 3, 2020. This was confirmed by CBS Entertainment president Kelly Kahl and show's showrunner and co-creator Peter Lenkov.

=== Casting ===
In February 2010, it was announced that Daniel Dae Kim had been cast to play Chin Ho Kelly, an ex-cop trained by Steve McGarrett's father. He was the first actor cast for the remake. Several days later, Alex O'Loughlin was cast as Steve McGarrett, the son of ex-cop John McGarrett (portrayed by William Sadler). The producers pay homage to the original series throughout the first year by making one of Steve's hobbies restoring his father's 1974 Mercury Marquis, which is in fact the actual car driven by Jack Lord in the latter half of the original series' run. Actress Grace Park was later cast as rookie detective Kona "Kono" Kalakaua. Although in the original series, the character of Kono was male, the reboot series swapped the cop's gender in order to steer clear of a task force devoid of women. Scott Caan was cast as Danny "Danno" Williams. In the recurring cast are Jean Smart as Governor Pat Jameson and Masi Oka as the medical examiner Max Bergman. Oka was upgraded to series regular for the second season.

Of note, several recurring roles have been filled by surviving members of the original cast. Al Harrington, who played Det. Ben Kokua in the original series, now plays a friend of McGarrett's, Mamo Kahike. Dennis Chun, who had various guest roles in the original series and is the son of Kam Fong Chun (the actor who portrayed the original Chin Ho), has a recurring role as HPD Sgt. Duke Lukela in the remake. James MacArthur, the last surviving main cast member from the original series, agreed to guest-star in a first-season episode; however, he died on October 28, 2010, before filming his appearance.

Larisa Oleynik was cast as Jessica Kaye (changed to Jenna Kaye in the episode broadcast), scheduled to join the Five-0 task force in the show's 19th episode. Oleynik appeared on a recurring basis for the remainder of the 2010–11 season, with an option to become a regular in season 2; however, her character was killed off in season 2, episode 10. It was also announced that Terry O'Quinn would be joining the cast of the show in season two, along with Lauren German, who would play Lori Weston, a former Homeland Security (and FBI agent) official assigned by the new governor to keep an eye on the team.

Since the show began in 2010 Michelle Borth had a recurring role where she appeared as on and off Steve McGarrett's girlfriend, Lt. Catherine Rollins, a Navy Lieutenant. On March 26, 2012, CBS announced that Borth would become a cast regular on Hawaii Five-0 for season 3. On March 27, 2014, it was announced that she would not be returning for the fifth season, with the reason for her departure left unknown. On April 24, 2015, it was announced that Borth would return as a guest star for the shows fifth-season finale. In July 2015 it was announced that Borth would have a recurring role in the first three episodes of the shows 6th season. On September 8, 2016, it was announced that Borth would be returning as a guest for the shows 150th episode. Christine Lahti was also cast in a recurring role as Doris McGarrett, the thought-to-be-deceased mother of Steve McGarrett.

On July 10, 2013, ahead of the show's fourth season it was announced that Chi McBride would have a guest spot in the first episode of the season. On November 21, 2013, it was announced that McBride would become a series regular beginning with the seasons 10th episode. After appearing as a guest star in several season four episodes, Jorge Garcia who plays the character of Jerry Ortega (a conspiracy theorist and high school classmate of Chin's) was promoted to series regular commencing season five. This is the second time Kim and Garcia serve as regulars together with Lost being the first.

Beginning with the second episode of the 2016–17 season, Claire Forlani had a recurring role as Alicia Brown, a retired criminal profiler who helped the team find a serial killer.

On November 17, 2016, it was announced that Oka who portrays Bergman would be departing the series after the thirteenth episode of the seventh season.

On June 30, 2017, ahead of the series's eighth season, it was announced that series regulars Kim and Park would be departing the series due to a salary dispute with CBS. Kim and Park had been seeking pay equality with co-stars O'Loughlin and Caan, but did not reach satisfactory deals with CBS Television Studios. CBS's final offer to Kim and Park was 10–15% lower than what O'Loughlin and Caan make in salary. An update of their characters would be given in the first episode of the new season.

Following Kim's and Park's departures it was announced that longtime recurring cast member Ian Anthony Dale who portrays Kono Kalakaua's husband Adam Noshimuri had been upped to series regular for the eighth season. It was also announced that Meaghan Rath and Beulah Koale would join the series as new characters and new members of Five-0.

On July 21, 2017, it was announced that recurring cast members Taylor Wily, Kimee Balmilero, and Dennis Chun would also be upped to series regulars for the eighth season.

On March 19, 2018, it was announced that Borth would once again return to the series in a guest role for the twentieth episode of the series' eighth season.

=== Music ===
Hawaii Five-0 uses the original show's theme song composed by Morton Stevens. Critics received an early copy of the pilot with a synthesizer and guitar-based version of the theme. After negative reaction to the reworked song spread quickly online, Kurtzman said he and others realized that changing the music was a mistake, and arranged for studio musicians, including three who had worked on the original from 1968, to rerecord the theme "exactly as it was", except shortened to 30 seconds from its original length of about 60 seconds. Original instrumental music is composed by Brian Tyler and Keith Power. An additional television score from Hawaii Five-0, featuring music written for the series by Brian Tyler and Keith Power was released in July 2023.

=== Soundtrack ===
Hawaii Five-0: Original Songs from the Television Series

Soundtrack album by Various
- Released: October 4, 2011
- Recorded: Various dates
- Genre: Soundtrack
- Length: 44:33
- Language: English
- Label: CBS

Hawaii Five-0: Original Songs from the Television Series is a soundtrack album featuring music used in the CBS television series Hawaii Five-0. The first volume in the series received attention for how show producers integrated these new and previously unreleased tracks from major-name artists into the second-season episodes. This method contrasted with the norm for TV soundtracks, which tend to be compilations of previously released music that is already available individually or on other albums. Hawaii Five-0: Original Songs from the Television Series was released on October 4, 2011.

No.	Title	Artist	Length
1.	"Hawaii Five-0 Main Title Theme"	Brian Tyler	1:47
2.	"World Upside Down"	Jimmy Cliff	3:09
3.	"Best of Me"	Goo Goo Dolls	4:00
4.	"Out of Control"	Switchfoot	4:10
5.	"Should We Believe"	Train	3:46
6.	"Closer"	Corinne Bailey Rae	4:16
7.	"Don't Ever Take Yourself Away"	Bob Dylan	3:30
8.	"Ukulele Five-0"	Jake Shimabukuro	2:44
9.	"Love That's Bigger"	The Swell Season	2:47
10.	"Pass It On"	Ziggy Marley	3:28
11.	"Hi'ilawe"	John Cruz	3:48
12.	"Book 'Em Danno (Suite From Hawaii Five-0 2010)"	Brian Tyler & Keith Power	6:45
Total length:			44:33

=== McGarrett's car ===
There were actually three cars used by Steve McGarrett for the show. The first car driven by the original Steve McGarrett in Hawaii Five-O was a 1967 Mercury Marquis 2-door, for stock footage for the pilot. The main car used once the regular 1968 season began, was the beautiful 4-door ‘68 Mercury Park Lane Brougham. It was used through the end of the ‘73 season. The last car used, was a 1974 Mercury Marquis 4-door hardtop. The car has belonged to stuntman John Nordlum since the original series ended. Nordlum has let the car be used in the new series, where it is said to have belonged to Steve McGarrett's father John. The license plate is still F6-3958.

== Broadcast and release ==
The series premiered in the United States on CBS on September 20, 2010, exactly 42 years after the premiere of the original series. Canada's Global TV and NTV premiered the show at the same time as the United States premiere. Hawaii Five-0 has been syndicated for broadcast in several countries worldwide, including Australia, the United Kingdom, New Zealand and South Africa. In Poland, the series is premiered on Telewizja Polsat and TV4 on January 3, 2015 with Polish title "Hawaje 5-0".

=== Syndication ===
Originally, TNT acquired the off-network rights to air the series and began airing episodes on the cable channel in August 2014. Ion Television has since acquired the off-network rights to the series; episodes began airing in January 2021.

=== Streaming ===
All episodes are available to stream with Paramount+ (formerly CBS All Access).

== Home media ==
Season(s)	Episodes	Release date			
Season(s)	Episodes	Region 1/A	Region 2/B (UK)	Region 2/B (Germany)	Region 4/B
DVD
1	24	September 20, 2011	September 26, 2011	November 1, 2014	December 1, 2011
2	23 (+1) (Note: Set includes 23 episodes of Hawaii Five-0 plus one episode of NCIS: Los Angeles that concludes a crossover event.)	September 18, 2012	September 24, 2012	November 1, 2014	September 19, 2012
3	24 (+1) (Note: Set includes 24 episodes of Hawaii Five-0 plus one episode of the original Hawaii Five-O series.)	September 24, 2013	September 30, 2013	February 5, 2015	September 25, 2013
4	22	September 16, 2014	September 15, 2014	August 6, 2015	January 28, 2015
5	25	September 1, 2015	September 14, 2015	April 21, 2016	February 11, 2016
6	25	September 13, 2016	September 2016	February 2, 2017	November 16, 2016
7	25	September 5, 2017	September 18, 2017	March 8, 2018	September 20, 2017
8	25	September 4, 2018	September 10, 2018	TBA	TBA
1–8	193 (+2) (Note: Set includes 193 episodes of Hawaii Five-0 plus one episode of the original Hawaii Five-O and one episode of NCIS: Los Angeles that concludes a crossover.)	—N/a	September 24, 2018	—N/a	
9	25 (+1) (Note: Set includes 25 episodes of Hawaii Five-0 plus one episode of the original Hawaii Five-O series.)	September 10, 2019	TBA	TBA	TBA
10	22 (+1) (Note: Set includes 22 episodes of Hawaii Five-0 plus one episode of the Magnum P.I. remake that concludes a crossover.)	July 28, 2020	TBA	TBA	TBA
The Complete Series	240 (+4) (Note: Set includes 240 episodes of Hawaii Five-0 plus two episodes of the original Hawaii Five-O series as well as an episode of NCIS: Los Angeles and an episode of the Magnum P.I. remake both of which concludes crossover events.)	December 8, 2020	—N/a	—N/a	—N/a
Blu-ray
1	24	February 14, 2012	September 26, 2011	May 16, 2012	November 7, 2012
2	23	September 18, 2012	September 24, 2012	January 3, 2013	November 7, 2012
3	24	September 24, 2013	TBA	March 6, 2014	September 25, 2013
4	22	TBA	TBA	February 5, 2015	TBA
5	25	TBA	TBA	April 21, 2016	TBA
6	25	TBA	TBA	February 2, 2017	TBA
7	25	TBA	TBA	March 8, 2018	TBA
8	25	TBA	TBA	TBA	TBA

== Reception and impact ==
=== Critical reception ===
The show has received generally positive reviews from critics. Metacritic gave season one of the show a 66 out of 100 aggregate score based on reviews from 29 critics. Rotten Tomatoes gave season one a score of 74% based on 23 reviews. The site's consensus calls it: "A brisk, slick reboot of an old favorite, Hawaii Five-0's picturesque locales and attractive cast make for pleasurable viewing."

On May 19, 2010, The Honolulu Advertiser offered an opinion about the new version: "A smart script, slick production values and maybe a splash of nostalgia got the remake of Hawaii Five-O placed on the CBS prime-time lineup this fall," but went on to add, "it takes more than a brand name to capture viewers' attention." The piece also pointed out that times have changed since the original left the air, citing other shows that were set in Hawaii which have come and gone. It expressed a hope that the producers will succeed in bringing a new life to the title with this remake. Hawaii Five-0 was also in the Guinness World Records 2012 for Highest-Rated New Show in the U.S. with a record 19.34 million viewers for its January 23, 2011 episode (Kai e'e).

=== Ratings ===
Season	Time slot (ET)	Episodes	Season premiere		Season finale		TV season	Rank	Viewers (in millions)
Season	Time slot (ET)	Episodes	Date	Viewers (in millions)	Date	Viewers (in millions)	TV season	Rank	Viewers (in millions)
1	Monday 10:00 pm	24	September 20, 2010	14.20	May 16, 2011	10.41	2010–11	22	11.96
2	Monday 10:00 pm	23	September 19, 2011	12.19	May 14, 2012	11.42	2011–12	26	11.83
3	Monday 10:00 pm	24	September 24, 2012	8.06	May 20, 2013	9.00	2012–13	35	10.36
4	Friday 9:00 pm	22	September 27, 2013	9.46	May 9, 2014	9.21	2013–14	21	11.66
5	Friday 9:00 pm	25	September 26, 2014	8.97	May 8, 2015	8.27	2014–15	20	12.28
6	Friday 9:00 pm	25	September 25, 2015	8.30	May 13, 2016	8.82	2015–16	25	11.04
7	Friday 9:00 pm	25	September 23, 2016	10.22	May 12, 2017	8.22	2016–17	15	12.15
8	Friday 9:00 pm	25	September 29, 2017	8.64	May 18, 2018	6.62	2017–18	18	11.00
9	Friday 9:00 pm	25	September 28, 2018	7.49	May 17, 2019	5.11	2018–19	26	10.01
10	Friday 8:00 pm (1–14); Friday 9:00 pm (15–22)	22	September 27, 2019	7.03	April 3, 2020	9.59	2019–20	21	9.68

=== Awards and nominations ===
Series star Scott Caan was nominated for a Golden Globe Award for Best Supporting Actor – Series, Miniseries or Television Film for his role as Danny on Hawaii Five-0. Hawaii Five-0 also won the "Favorite New TV Drama" at the 37th People's Choice Awards on January 5, 2011.

Awards and nominations for Hawaii Five-0
Year	Award	Category	Nominees	Result	Ref
2011	Golden Globe Award	Best Performance by an Actor in a Supporting Role in a Series, Mini-Series or Motion Picture Made for Television	Scott Caan	Nominated	
2011	Primetime Emmy Award	Outstanding Stunt Coordination	Jeff Cadiente	Nominated	
2011	BMI Film & TV Award	BMI TV Music Award	Keith Power & Brian Tyler	Won	
2011	Hawaii International Film Festival	Mahalo Nui Loa Award	Hawaii Five-0	Won	
2011	People's Choice Award	Favorite New TV Drama	Hawaii Five-0	Won	
2011	Teen Choice Award	Choice TV Show: Action	Hawaii Five-0	Nominated	
2011	Teen Choice Award	Choice TV Actor: Action	Daniel Dae Kim	Nominated	
2011	Teen Choice Award	Choice TV Actress: Action	Grace Park	Nominated	
2012	Primetime Emmy Award	Outstanding Stunt Coordination	Jeff Cadiente	Nominated	
2012	Teen Choice Award	Choice TV: Action	Hawaii Five-0	Nominated	
2012	Teen Choice Award	Choice TV Actor: Action	Daniel Dae Kim	Nominated	
2012	Teen Choice Award	Choice TV Actress: Action	Grace Park	Nominated	
2013	BMI Film & TV Award	BMI TV Music Award	Keith Power & Brian Tyler	Won	
2013	Teen Choice Award	Choice TV Show: Action	Hawaii Five-0	Nominated	
2013	Teen Choice Award	Choice TV Actor: Action	Scott Caan	Nominated	
2013	Teen Choice Award	Choice TV Actress: Action	Grace Park	Nominated	
2013	TV Guide Award	Favorite Bromance	Alex O'Loughlin & Scott Caan	Won	
2013	Visual Effects Society Award	Outstanding Supporting Visual Effects in a Broadcast Program	Gevork Babityan, Jon Howard, Armen V. Kevorkian & Rick Ramirez	Nominated	
2013	Young Artist Awards	Best Performance in a TV Series – Guest Starring Young Actor 11–13	Gregory Kasyan	Nominated	
2014	Primetime Emmy Award	Outstanding Special and Visual Effects	Armen V. Kevorkian, Alexander Soltes, John Hartigan, Jane Sharvina, Rick Ramirez, Dan Lopez, Steve Graves, Andranik Taranyan & Chad Schott	Nominated	
2014	Hollywood Post Alliance	Outstanding Visual Effects – Television	Armen V. Kevorkian, Jane Sharvina, Andranik Taranyan, Steve Graves, Dan Lopez, Encore VFX	Nominated	
2014	Visual Effects Society Award	Outstanding Supporting Visual Effects in a Broadcast Program	Armen V. Kevorkian, Alexander Soltes, Jane Sharvina, Andranik Taranyan	Nominated	
2015	Young Artist Award	Best Performance in a TV Series – Guest Starring Young Actress 17–21	Chanel Marriott	Nominated	
2015	SOCAN Awards	International TV Series Music	Keith Power	Won	
2016	SOCAN Awards	International TV Series Music	Keith Power	Won	
2016	BMI Film & TV Awards	BMI TV Music Award	Keith Power	Won	
2017	BMI Film & TV Awards	BMI TV Music Award	Keith Power	Won	
2017	SOCAN Awards	International TV Series Music	Keith Power	Won	

=== Effect on Hawaii's economy ===
The popularity of Hawaii Five-0 resulted in a positive effect on several local businesses that saw an increase in sales after they were featured in particular episodes. Visitors to the USS Missouri Memorial Association increased 25 percent in 2010, a record year. Waiola Shave Ice, the business run by Kamekona on the show, saw a 20 percent increase in shave ice sales, along with a 30 percent rise in overall sales. Kona Brewing Company also saw a 60 percent increase in sales after their beers were featured as McGarrett's favored alcoholic beverage in several episodes. The tourist economy was also impacted, as many Mainlander fans were subsequently inspired to visit the islands after viewing the series.
