= Jonathan Higgins =

Fictional character on Magnum, P.I.

Dr Jonathan Quayle Higgins III, 1918, Baron of Perth, VC
- Magnum, P.I. character
- First appearance: Season 1
- Last appearance: Season 8
- Portrayed by: John Hillerman

In-universe information
- Occupation: Major-Domo: Robin's Nest; Sergeant Major, British Army
- Family: Baron of Perth • Albert, Duke of Perth (father) • Older brother Younger brothers Sister (with 4 children); Half-siblings: • Elmo Ziller • Fr. Paddy McGuinness • Don Luis Mongueo • Soo Ling • Elizabeth Whitefeather • Catooba Noomba
- Known military decorations include the Victoria Cross

Jonathan Quayle Higgins III, VC is a fictional character in the 1980–1988 crime drama television series, Magnum, P.I. portrayed by actor John Hillerman. Hillerman won an Emmy for the role in 1987.

The character of Higgins appeared in crossover episodes of two other television shows: Simon & Simon in 1982, and Murder, She Wrote in 1986.

== Origin ==
Although the character is English, actor John Hillerman was American, and had served in the U.S. Air Force. Hillerman practiced the English accent in onstage productions in Ohio before taking the accent to Hollywood. The character widely known as Jonathan Higgins began life as Simon Brimmer in the 1975 TV movie Ellery Queen: Too Many Suspects and the 1975–1976 TV series Ellery Queen. Brimmer was an arrogant and self-assured character who used these personality traits as a foil to Ellery Queen (Jim Hutton). Hillerman said that playing a snob came easily to him.

== Fictional character biography ==
The character Higgins was born sometime in the year 1920. In the episode "Echoes of the Mind" he reveals that he is the second son of the Duke of Perth, a retired senior British Army officer, and Baron of Perth in his own right, though he rarely uses the title. He went to school at Eton College and the Royal Military College, Sandhurst, but was sent down from the latter after another officer cadet allowed him to take the blame for a prank that had resulted in the serious injury of a third cadet. Higgins obeyed an honour code among the cadets by not revealing the true identity of the culprit at the cost of being rejected himself by Sandhurst for an officer's commission. Unable to face his father, he enlisted into the ranks of the West Yorkshire Regiment and he was awarded the Victoria Cross.

Higgins has three half brothers, also portrayed on the show by Hillerman. The first was an American, Elmo Ziller. The second was an Irish priest, Father Paddy McGuinness. The third was Don Luis Mongueo. A fourth named Soo Ling is mentioned but never seen.

The character served for 37 years in the British army in the Second World War, the Indochina War (assisting the French), New Guinea, India and Kenya, among others. Higgins carried the discipline of his military background into his civilian life. He earned the position of sergeant major in the British Army, and was in MI6 the British Secret Intelligence Service.

The character holds a 1947 doctorate in mathematics from University of Cambridge. This is revealed when he tells a pregnant woman (correctly, though misleadingly) that he is "a doctor". He owns two highly trained and intelligent Doberman Pinschers, Zeus and Apollo (whom he often refers to as "The Lads").

Higgins is well versed in both armed and unarmed (kung fu) combat techniques. He expresses fondness for older British Army weaponry such as the Sten and Sterling submachine guns, although he is more than capable of using modern weaponry such as the Heckler & Koch MP5. There is a small collection of weaponry (mostly pistols and shotguns) at the estate that he and Magnum have use of as needed. Occasional episodes show Higgins utilizing less common weapons, such as a 19th-century brass cannon and a samurai sword. Like Magnum, he does not make a habit of carrying a gun.

In regard to his personal life, Higgins was once nearly engaged to be married; years later his old flame visits him in Hawaii. He described her as being built like the Prince Albert Memorial.

Higgins is the estate manager for Robin Masters's beachfront estate on Oahu, called "Robin's Nest". The rich, eccentric (and perpetually travelling) Masters was largely an offstage character on the show, though frequently referred to. After Orson Welles (who voiced Robin Masters) died, the show's writers decided to have Thomas Magnum, a private investigator and Head of Security for Robin's Nest, begin to suspect Higgins is Robin Masters. This took some retconning, as Higgins had previously been shown alone in a room conversing on a speakerphone with Masters. There were numerous other prior examples of Masters being a different person from Higgins, but Magnum came to suspect these were staged with the help of an actor hired by Higgins to portray "Masters". The idea that Higgins could secretly be Masters became a long running gag in the series after Thomas told his friends T.C. and Rick about his idea.

In the final episode of the series, Higgins tells Magnum that he really is Robin Masters. However, Higgins later recants at Rick's wedding.

== Character ==
Higgins plays Magnum's foil. Higgins has been described as representing "the pomposity, elitism, and stuffiness of the Old Guard (literally and figuratively)". John Hillerman has stated, "Higgins in any situation thinks he's the only sane person around while everyone else is raving mad." Despite this, all four main protagonists formed close friendships, although there were the constant squabbles.

In one episode, a rabbi recounts an encounter with a young Higgins. He describes how in 1946 Higgins refused a standing order to fire on Jewish refugees trying to reach Palestine. When asked how he could disobey, Higgins replied, "I was obeying a higher law that does not permit me to shoot unarmed refugees looking for a home."

Higgins is known for his tendency to ramble when someone asks him a question. He usually manages to relate it to a story in either Korea or World War II, but sometimes other events. In one episode, when he is being robbed by people in costume, he says, "I believe I've been in a situation much like this ... actually, no, this is a first ... but I read about something like this once."

=== Crossover with Murder, She Wrote ===
Higgins is revealed to be a fan of Jessica Fletcher in the crossover episode with Murder, She Wrote and helped her free Magnum from prison in the Murder, She Wrote episode "Magnum on Ice". "Magnum on Ice" is the conclusion of the Magnum P.I. episode "Novel Connection", which had a crossover with Murder, She Wrote.

== 2018 reboot ==
For the 2018 reboot, Higgins was re-written as a woman, named Juliet Higgins, portrayed by Perdita Weeks.

In the reboot, Higgins has a more active past in British military intelligence, having been a field operative (Magnum's CIA ex-fiancée Hannah identifies her as "the first woman to infiltrate the Russian Secret Police"). She was also "widowed" in the field when her own fiancé, a fellow operative, was murdered by a contract killer she later unmasked as her mentor. It is also implied that she may be related to Robin Masters; in the reboot, Magnum describes Masters as having been "embedded with the troops", making this the first instance that either Magnum or Higgins has actually met Masters. Unlike the original Higgins, Juliet is more taciturn and curt and does not ramble. She retains the "lads" (Zeus and Apollo, two highly trained Doberman Pinschers) of the original Higgins, but enjoys setting them on Magnum in retaliation for his using the "privileges" of Robin's Nest more than the original one. This Higgins is more involved in Magnum's cases than the original, to the point that she is considered a member of Magnum's squad: he requests that she formally partner up with him in the second season, and she eventually accepts. In episode 17 Juliet says she has trouble with her visa, Thomas asks her to marry him to get her green card. She refuses at first, but later in the episode when she finds out that her lawyer can't do anything about she accepts Magnum's proposal, although she breaks the engagement three episodes later. Robin agrees to let her become the owner of Robin's Nest, which allows her to stay in the country. In the fourth season, Magnum and Higgins struggle with their mutual feelings for one another and finally kiss at the end of the season. In the fifth and final season, the two navigate maintaining a romantic relationship while remaining business and investigative partners. In the finale, Juliet is forced to take a hard look at her relationship with Magnum when she finds a ring. Though she soon learns that Thomas was only holding the ring as a favor to Rick, they have a heart to heart where she reveals that she had planned to say yes had he proposed, affirming her love for him.
