= Dennis Chun =

American actor

- Born: March 18, 1952 (age 74); Territory of Hawaii, United States
- Occupation: Actor
- Years active: 1972–present
- Known for: Sgt. Duke Lukela in Hawaii Five-0 and Magnum P.I.
- Parent(s): Gladys Lindo and Kam Fong Chun

Dennis Chun (born March 18, 1952) is an American actor. He is the son of Hawaii Five-O star Kam Fong Chun, and portrayed Sgt. Duke Lukela in the reboot of the series, in which his father was known for playing Chin Ho Kelly from the original show.

== Filmography ==
- 1972: The Brady Bunch: Young Workman
- 1974: Inferno in Paradise: Kimo
- 1974–1975: Hawaii Five-O: Officer Wade/Assistant/Attendant
- 1988: Magnum, P.I.: William Chun
- 1989–1990: Jake and the Fatman: Detective/Johnny Witt
- 1991: Goodbye Paradise: John Young
- 2010–2020: Hawaii Five-0: Sgt. Duke Lukela
- 2019–2022: Magnum P.I.: Sgt. Duke Lukela
