= Hawaii Five-0 (2010 TV series) season 9 =

9th season of 2010 American TV series

Hawaii Five-0
- Season 9
- Season 9 DVD cover
- Showrunner: Peter M. Lenkov
- Starring: Alex O'Loughlin; Scott Caan; Ian Anthony Dale; Meaghan Rath; Jorge Garcia; Beulah Koale; Taylor Wily; Dennis Chun; Kimee Balmilero; Chi McBride
- No. of episodes: 25

Release
- Original network: CBS
- Original release: September 28, 2018 – May 17, 2019

Season chronology
- ← Previous; Season 8 Next → Season 10

The ninth season of the police procedural drama series Hawaii Five-0 premiered on CBS on September 28, 2018, for the 2018–19 television season in the United States. CBS renewed the series for a ninth season in April 2018, that was originally expected to contain 22 episodes; however, CBS ordered additional episodes bringing the total count to 25. The season concluded on May 17, 2019.

The series continues to center on the Five-0 Task Force, a specialized state police task force, established by the Hawaiian Governor that investigates major crimes in the state of Hawaii including murder, terrorism, and human trafficking. The ninth season features ten starring roles, all of which returned from the previous season. In addition, former main cast members, Michelle Borth and Taryn Manning, reprised their roles in a guest starring capacity as their characters Lieutenant Catherine Rollins and Mary Ann McGarrett in the seasons eleventh and twenty-third episodes, respectively. Former major recurring cast members including Mark Dacascos and Terry O'Quinn also returned as guest stars after long absences in the series. Numerous cast members also appeared as guest stars on Magnum P.I. which Peter M. Lenkov is also the showrunner on and which is also filmed in Hawaii.

The ninth season ranked 26th for the 2018–19 television season and had an overall average of 10.01 million viewers. "Ka ʻōwili ʻōkaʻi," the season premiere, brought in 7.49 million viewers; meanwhile, "Hana Mao 'ole ka ua o Waianae," the season finale, was viewed by 5.11 million viewers. The series was also renewed for a tenth season which premiered on September 27.

== Cast and characters ==
=== Main cast ===
- Alex O'Loughlin as Lieutenant Commander Steven "Steve" McGarrett, United States Navy Reserve
- Scott Caan as Detective Sergeant Daniel "Danny" "Danno" Williams
- Ian Anthony Dale as Officer Adam Noshimuri
- Meaghan Rath as Officer Tani Rey
- Jorge Garcia as Special Consultant Jerry Ortega
- Beulah Koale as Officer Junior Reigns
- Taylor Wily as Kamekona Tupuola
- Dennis Chun as Sergeant Duke Lukela, Honolulu Police Department
- Kimee Balmilero as Dr. Noelani Cunha, Medical Examiner
- Chi McBride as Captain Lou Grover

==== 200th episode ====
In the 200th episode which was set in 1941, the main cast portrayed characters separate from their normal roles. The actor/character portrayals in the episode are as follows:

- Alex O'Loughlin as Steve McGarrett, grandfather of the present day character
- Scott Caan as Milton Cooper
- Ian Anthony Dale as Earl Blackstone
- Meaghan Rath as Alexa Alana
- Jorge Garcia as Officer Mike Flanagan
- Beulah Koale as Evan Kekoa
- Taylor Wily as “Biggie” Tupa
- Dennis Chun as Sergeant Naskiuchi
- Kimee Balmilero as Doctor
- Chi McBride as Captain Charles Sumner

=== Recurring ===
- Shawn Thomsen as Officer Pua Kai
- Rochelle Aytes as Agent Greer
- Shawn Mokuahi Garnett as Flippa
- Zach Sulzbach as Charlie Williams

=== Guest stars ===
- Kekoa Kekumano as Nahele Huikala
- Mark Dacascos as Wo Fat
- Jack Coleman as Miller
- Duane "Dog" Chapman as himself
- Andrew Lawrence as Eric Russo
- Laura Mellow as Nalani Lukela
- Cidni Romias as Akela Nakahara
- Eric Steinberg as Captain Keo
- Eddie Cahill as Carson Rodes
- Richard Herd as Milton Cooper
- Chris Mulkey as William Pettifer
- Mariano Farrar as Clarence Whitmour
- Clifton Powell as Percy Lee "PJ" Grover Jr.
- Louis Gossett Jr. as Percy Grover Sr.
- Gladys Knight as Ella Grover
- Michelle Hurd as Renee Grover
- Chosen Jacobs as Will Grover
- Sasha Colby as Malie
- Al Harrington as Mamo Kahike
- Terry O'Quinn as Joe White
- Michelle Borth as Catherine Rollins
- Chris Vance as Harry Langford
- David Keith as Wade Gutches
- Claire van der Boom as Rachel Hollander
- Teilor Grubbs as Grace Williams
- Bob Hiltermann as Hal
- Eric Scanlan as Natano Reigns
- Reed Diamond as Claude Nostromo
- Anna Enger as Layla Lee
- J.J. Soria as Tory Lehea
- Michael Ironside as Robert Castor
- Joan Collins as Amanda Savage
- Ted McGinley as Special Agent Samuel "Sam" Collins
- Willie Garson as Gerard Hirsch
- Ryan Bittle as John McGarrett
- Brittany Ishibashi as Tamiko Masuda
- Eric Elizaga as Young Duke Lukela
- Erin Smith as Young Doris McGarrett
- Revel Kolohe Sloboda as Young Steve McGarrett
- Charlie Saxton as Ricky Schiff
- Taryn Manning as Mary Ann McGarrett
- Matthew Lawrence as Josh Baker
- Joey Lawrence as Aaron Wright
- Ashley Chewning as Jane Martin

== Episodes ==
The number in the "No. overall" column refers to the episode's number within the overall series, whereas the number in the "No. in season" column refers to the episode's number within this particular season. The titles of each episode are in the Hawaiian language, though its English translations are directly underneath. "Prod. code" refers to the order in which the episodes were produced. "U.S. viewers (millions)" refers to the number of viewers in the U.S. in millions who watched the episode as it was aired.

No. overall	No. in season	Title	Directed by	Written by	Original release date	Prod. code	U.S. viewers (millions)
194	1	"Ka ʻōwili ʻōkaʻi" "Cocoon"	Bryan Spicer	Leonard Freeman & Peter M. Lenkov	September 28, 2018	903	7.49
Five-0 investigates the murder of one of McGarrett’s CIA agent friends and suspects that there might be a mole within the CIA. McGarrett’s lets himself be captured in order to find the mole, only to find out it's McGarrett's ex-girlfriend CIA Agent Greer. While in a sensory deprivation tank, McGarrett dreams that Wo Fat is responsible. Meanwhile, Tani struggles to find the nerve to tell McGarrett about possibly finding the murder weapon to Adam’s sister in his house. Also, McGarrett decides to bury the money Kamekona loaned him in a hole he and Junior dig in his backyard. Note: This episode is a re-make of the original series pilot episode "Cocoon."
195	2	"Ke Kanaka I Haʻule Mai Ka Lewa Mai" "The Man Who Fell from the Sky"	Eagle Egilsson	David Wolkove & Matt Wheeler	October 5, 2018	902	7.39
Five-0 investigates the disappearance of a vacationer and a U.S. Marshal who fled a plane mid-flight. They soon discover that the vacationer is actually a Chinese sleeper agent who killed the U.S. Marshal in the process. Agent Greer is revealed to be working with the Chinese spies and Five-0 arrests her. Meanwhile, Tani reaches out to her training instructor at the Police Academy to run ballistics on Adam’s gun off the book. Also, McGarrett and Danny lose part of Kamekona’s investment money thanks to McGarrett’s dog Eddie who dug it up.
196	3	"Mimiki Ke Kai, Ahuwale Ka Papa Leho" "When the Sea Draws Out the Tidal Wave, the Rocks Where the Cowries Hide Are Exposed"	Antonio Negret	Rob Hanning	October 12, 2018	901	7.68
During a heat wave, an arrested woman undergoing transport shoots two Honolulu Police Department (HPD) officers and a motorcyclist in cold blood. With an increase in 911 calls, Tani and Junior are forced to assist the HPD. Meanwhile, a black-out persuades Kamekona to price-gouge prices at his Shaved Ice stand, only to have the stand toppled over and damaged by angry customers. While at the grocery store, Jerry stops a robbery in progress to find out the suspect's wife is pregnant at home and in bad condition. At the golf course, Grover beats his best score.
197	4	"A'ohe Kio Pohaku Nalo i Ke Alo Pali" "On the Slope of the Cliff, Not One Jutting Rock Is Hidden from Sight"	Ron Underwood	Talia Gonzalez & Bisanne Masoud	October 19, 2018	905	7.48
Jerry travels with Junior to bring home a fallen soldier whom Junior motivated to join the service and was killed in action. Jerry opens up about how he was rejected from joining the service. Meanwhile, McGarrett and Danny investigate a footless body found in sand dumped from a truck that was part of black market dredging and selling of ocean sand, which lead to them finding not one but two weighted pairs of feet in the ocean. Also, Duke decides to retire from the HPD but McGarrett talks him into trying to clear his name first.
198	5	"A'ohe Mea 'Imi A Ka Maka" "Nothing More the Eyes to Search For"	Liz Allen-Rosenbaum	Zoe Robyn & Sean O'Reilly	October 26, 2018	904	6.97
On Halloween night, the Five-0 task force investigates a series of pictures of murder scenes that were drawn by a child's mysterious friend who has been a pawn in a series of murders. Meanwhile, Jerry revisits his childhood campsite to search for the remains of a fellow camper who had been murdered and that Jerry had witnessed. Later, Tani receives a call from her Police Academy instructor who ran the ballistics on the gun she found at Adam's house, and it was revealed as the weapon that killed Adam's sister.
199	6	"Aia I Hi'Ikua; I Hi'Ialo" "Is Borne on the Back; Is Borne in the Arms"	Peter Weller	Rob Hanning & Paul Grellong	November 2, 2018	906	7.88
McGarrett receives news that one of his Navy SEAL team members was killed and learns that he is a suspect in a kidnapping case led by an NCIS agent. Later on, McGarrett takes things too far and interferes with the investigation and gets arrested. Meanwhile, Adam returns to Hawaii and reveals that he and Kono had broken up. Tani hesitates with the decision to turn in Adam because of the gun she discovered but later finds out that someone is trying to set him up.
200	7	"Pua A'e La Ka Uwahi O Ka Moe" "The Smoke Seen in the Dream Now Rises"	Bryan Spicer	Story by : Peter M. Lenkov; Teleplay by : David Wolkove & Matt Wheeler	November 9, 2018	907	7.53
In present day Hawaii, during the soft opening of McGarrett and Danny's restaurant, a man approaches McGarrett revealing that he was best friends with and had worked with McGarrett's grandfather back in the 1940s. He gives McGarrett an unsolved 1940s case for him to investigate. Later on, while working through the case contents, McGarrett falls asleep and has a dream in which he is his grandfather and the rest of the Five-0 team are members of the unsolved case.
201	8	"Lele pū nā manu like" "Birds of a Feather..."	Carlos Bernard	Chi McBride	November 16, 2018	908	7.88
Lou has trouble with his family when his brother, mother, and father visit for Thanksgiving. Lou and his brother attempt to cook Thanksgiving dinner together and the two make it into a competition to see who can get the best turkey. When they get into an argument, a fire starts in Lou's kitchen. Meanwhile, the rest of the Five-0 task force attempt to solve the case of a missing baseball card. The thief of the baseball card turns out to be a volunteer at a local homeless shelter who only stole it to buy dinner for the shelter.
202	9	"Mai Ka Po Mai Ka 'oia'i'o" "Truth Comes from the Night"	Brad Tanenbaum	Christos Gage & Ruth Fletcher Gage	November 30, 2018	909	7.27
Five-0 investigates the murder of a local citizen who is responsible for making citizen's arrests and filming them. It is found the citizen was impersonating comic book characters. Jerry's wide knowledge of comic books along with their characters helps Five-0 solve the case. Meanwhile, Adam looks into the person responsible for killing his sister and framing him. The person however, turns themselves in before he can find them.
203	10	"Pio ke kukui, poʻele ka hale" "When the Light Goes Out, the House Is Dark"	Gabriel Beristain	Paul Grellong	December 7, 2018	911	7.81
When McGarrett is attacked and almost killed in his own home he is forced to flee Hawaii and travel to Montana with Joe White. Joe reveals that there is an assassin killing all of McGarrett’s SEAL team members who participated in an operation involving a 10-year-old boy. The rest of the Five-0 looks into the person who is trying to seek revenge. When McGarrett and Joe get into a gun battle with the assassins, Joe gets shot and later dies as a result of the injuries.
204	11	"Hala i ke ala o'i'ole mai" "Gone on the Road from which There Is No Returning"	Carl Weathers	Matt Wheeler & David Wolkove	January 4, 2019	910	7.19
Danny travels to Montana to reunite with McGarrett, who has exiled himself following Joe White’s death. Danny soon discovers that Steve and Catherine Rollins have been interrogating someone to find the person responsible for Joe’s death and upon identifying them set off with a team to take him down. Meanwhile, back in Hawaii, Grover, Tani and Adam investigate the disappearance of a bag of bones found abandoned in a storage locker.
205	12	"Ka hauli o ka mea hewa 'ole, he nalowale koke" "A Bruise Inflicted on an Innocent Person Vanishes Quickly"	Roderick Davis	Zoe Robyn	January 11, 2019	912	7.96
When Danny's daughter Grace doesn't return home from a party, his ex-wife Rachel turns to him for help. HPD finds her car rolled over in an embankment off the side of the road, with evidence pointing to her car travelling at an excessively dangerous speed. That does not match the Grace they know and Five-0 investigates, and find someone else is responsible. Meanwhile, after Tani's brother, Koa, has a friend who didn't check in during their rehab process. Tani and Adam investigate and find multiple people dead who overdosed on drugs.
206	13	"Ke iho mai nei ko luna" "Those Above are Descending"	Karen Gaviola	Story by : Johnny Richardson; Teleplay by : Rob Hanning & Sean O’Reilly	January 18, 2019	913	7.61
Murdered Jason Kamaka is washed ashore, amid signs he died deep underwater. Tani, Adam and Junior travel to Claude Nostromo's remote submarine environmental lab deep under the Pacific Ocean as one of the remaining crew must be the murderer: Walker, Brady, Nash, Cane. Junior and Tani discover a secret lab and evidence that Nostromo secretly tasked certain crew to map deposits of yttrium, a valuable substance he plans to mine illegally. It seems Nostromo remotely cut communications and set out to eliminate his own agents to keep the secret. Cane turned on Nostromo after he secretly tasked her to ensure his secret mission's success. She now plans to murder everyone aboard by sabotaging the base's oxygen supply. An evacuation ship is on the way but with the air about to run out McGarrett undertakes a risky free-dive to supply more oxygen. Meanwhile, Grace recuperates after her near-death car accident. Junior lends a hand to his estranged father.
207	14	"Ikiiki i ka la o Keawalua" "Depressed with the Heat of Keawalua"	Peter Weller	Paul Grellong	February 1, 2019	914	7.87
The Five-0 task force investigates the murder of one of Flippa’s friends and fellow band member. They soon discover that the suspect is a white supremacist, who just got out of prison four months ago, and is planning a bombing. Meanwhile, Grover grows close to this case as he dealt with a similar situation back in Chicago.
208	15	"Ho'Opio 'Ia E Ka Noho Ali'I A Ka Ua" "Made Prisoner by the Reign of the Rain"	Karen Gaviola	Rob Hanning	February 15, 2019	915	7.30
When a hurricane threatens the island, the FBI is forced to use Five-0 Headquarters as a holding spot for a recently captured most-wanted criminal, while the building is also being used as an evacuation refuge. A criminal cartel operative infiltrates Five-0 HQ and McGarrrett elicits the fact that the prisoner is about to turn State's evidence, so now the race is on to prevent the prisoner's murder. Meanwhile, after Tani and Junior are sent to aid with evacuation, Tani is held hostage in a house whose tenants are drug dealers. Also, Rachel and Danny begin rekindling their romantic relationship after she is forced to stay at his house during the storm.
209	16	"Hapai ke kuko, hanau ka hewa" "When Covetousness is Conceived, Sin is Born"	Jerry Levine	Talia Gonzalez & Bisanne Masoud	February 22, 2019	916	7.11
The Five-0 task force investigates the poisoning of Gwendoline Baker, the top salesperson of a beauty company. McGarrett finds out that the company is a pyramid scheme and that Baker was about to unmask the company's owner, Jocelyn Greene, with wrong-doing. Tani shares a personal story that involves the case. Meanwhile, Adam, who has just moved into a new home, lends a hand to a homeless man trying to reconnect with his family on the mainland.
210	17	"E'ao lu'au a kualima" "Offer Young Taro Leaves To"	Alex O'Loughlin	David Wolkove & Matt Wheeler	February 22, 2019	917	6.98
McGarrett and the task force investigates the latest in a string of high-value bank robberies. Junior runs into one of his old friends who works there and she insists she recognised one of the robbers despite the mask – Tory, the boyfriend of Junior's ex-girlfriend Layla. Junior decides to delay informing McGarrett in order to talk to him. Layla, mother to Tory's infant son, is indignant and defends Tory. Meanwhile, Five-0's police work tracks down the heist's mastermind. The murderer forces Tory to lure Junior to a meeting to force him at gunpoint to reveal what Five-0 knows, but Junior realises it is a trap and shows up with armed support. A gunfight ensues, and Tory and Junior end up in an armed stand-off, which ends in the former's death and a widowed Layla slapping Junior in retaliation.
211	18	"Ai no i ka 'ape he mane'o no ko ka nuku" "He who eats 'ape is bound to have his mouth itch"	Eagle Egilsson	Matt Wheeler & David Wolkove	March 8, 2019	918	7.27
Junior and Tani are forced to go undercover at a local gym as Five-0 investigates a series of lethal steroid injections going around Honolulu. Meanwhile, McGarrett meets and chauffeurs Danny’s ex-mother-in-law Amanda who is a famous author. Danny and Amanda initially butt heads but the two later make up when it is revealed she wants the best for Rachel.
212	19	"Pupuhi ka he’e o kai uli" "The Octopus of the Deep Spews its Ink"	Maja Vrvilo	Christos Gage & Ruth Fletcher Gage	March 15, 2019	919	6.51
Five-0 investigates the murder of a high-rise window washer. They quickly discover that he is a renowned street artist who may have had a target on his back because of his political beliefs. Tani calls in former criminal Gerard Hirsch, who is knowledgeable in art, to assist in the case. Meanwhile, Junior lends a hand to his father on the anniversary of his sister's death. Tani tries to reach out to Junior about his father but has no luck.
213	20	"Ke ala o ka pu" "Way of the Gun"	David Straiton	Paul Grellong	April 5, 2019	920	6.84
McGarrett and the rest of the Five-0 members reminisce about the memories of a .38 caliber, a "community gun", used in multiple homicides while investigating the latest homicide involving a teen girl who purchased the gun from a junkie. The gun was found to be connected to multiple Five-0 members, the same gun was used to kill Duke's former partner, in a cold case of Steve's dad, a robbery Danny responded to right after he moved to the island, and was used by Tani's ex-boyfriend who was a gang banger.
214	21	"He kama na ka pueo" "Offspring of an Owl"	Jerry Levine	David Wolkove & Matt Wheeler	April 12, 2019	921	6.87
The Five-0 task force investigates a murder of a private investigator who was getting close to solving a 20-year-old cold kidnapping case. Meanwhile, when McGarrett and Danny borrow an apartment to run surveillance, they find that one of their victims from a previous case has passed and are left with her cat.
215	22	"O ke kumu, o ka mana, ho'opuka 'ia" "The Teacher, the Pupil-let it Come Forth"	Brad Turner	Rob Hanning & Ashley Dizon	April 26, 2019	922	6.62
Five-0 investigates the murder of an undercover FBI agent. Adam has a special connection with the case as the victim was about to be married to a Yakuza boss's daughter. Meanwhile, Noelani is kidnapped and forced to assist her former mentor in performing life-saving surgery on a criminal boss, only to find out her former mentor turns out to be working with the criminal boss and is shot and killed.
216	23	"Ho'okahi no la o ka malihini" "A Stranger Only for a Day"	Gabriel Beristain	Zoe Robyn	May 3, 2019	923	6.77
McGarrett helps his visiting sister Mary, who is on vacation, spy on her shady neighbors. When Mary breaks into the neighbors' house, her and Steve find a basement full of weapons and dangerous chemicals. Meanwhile, Five-0 investigates the murders of a ride-share driver and his passenger. Also, the team teases the youngest members of Five-0 when Junior escorts Tani to a wedding.
217	24	"Hewa ka lima" "The Hand Is at Fault"	Peter Weller	Paul Grellong & Sean O'Reilly	May 10, 2019	925	6.78
When Aaron Wright begins working for the NSA, he turns to Five-0 for assistance when his co-workers are murdered. Five-0 begins investigating and finds a world of blackmails and murders, only for Adam and Jerry to figure out that Aaron tricked them into helping him. The two, along with Steve, attempt to contact his boss, agent Flores, for help but Aaron shoots Flores and escapes. Meanwhile, Lou helps out his brother Percy when someone begins stealing his recipe, only to find that Flippa wants to set up in business with Percy.
218	25	"Hana Mao 'ole ka ua o Waianae" "Endlessly Pours the Rain of Waianae"	Eagle Egilsson	Matt Wheeler & David Wolkove	May 17, 2019	924	5.11
Five-0 begins searching for Aaron Wright and runs into many dead-ends in the process. Aaron is later taken into custody and, in exchange for leniency, assists in finding the deadly weapons he sold. Meanwhile, Junior begins searching for his father after he and his gun go missing. Later, the wife of the man who killed Joe White and the rest of McGarrett's SEAL team opens fire in the Five-0 office with McGarrett and Jerry in the line of fire.

=== Crossovers ===
On July 19, 2018, it was announced that the season would see multiple crossovers with Magnum P.I. Lenkov confirmed the announcement and Kimee Balmilero as well as Taylor Wily made guest appearances as their Hawaii Five-0 characters in episodes one and two of Magnum P.I., respectively. Meanwhile, Alex O'Loughlin was set to cross paths with Jay Hernandez's character, Thomas Magnum, later in the season in a crossover event, however a full crossover event did not air until the following television season. Balmilero and Wily continued to make guest appearances throughout the first season. Dennis Chun appeared in the seventeenth episode.

== Production ==
=== Development ===
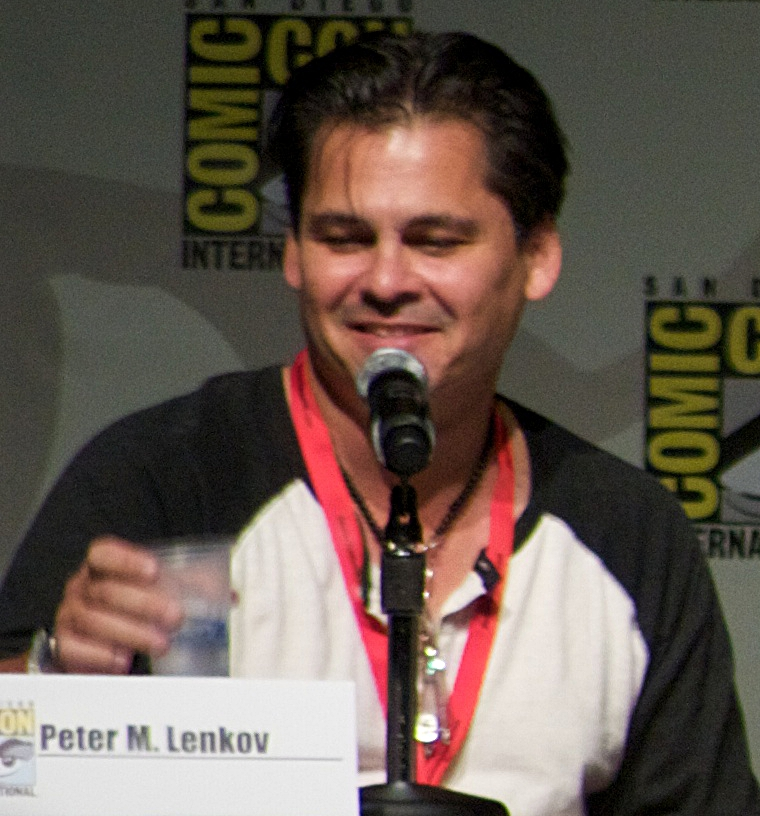
Peter M. Lenkov returned as executive producer and showrunner for a ninth consecutive season since the series' inception in 2010.

On April 18, 2018, CBS renewed the series for a ninth season. Peter M. Lenkov returned as executive producer and showrunner after signing a new multi-year deal with CBS. On July 9, 2018, it was announced that the ninth season is set to premiere on September 28, 2018, for the 2018–19 television season. The season contained the series 200th episode. The season was expected to contain 22 episodes. It was later revealed that the first episode of the season would be a remake of the 1968 episode from the original series, Hawaii Five-O, also entitled "Cocoon" On August 18, 2018, it was revealed that the 200th episode of the series would be the seventh aired episode of the season. Other series co-star Chi McBride, wrote an episode for the season. On Wednesday, August 22, 2018, with the anticipated landfall of Hurricane Lane, a Category 4 hurricane, in Hawaii CBS reported that they "were closely monitoring the situation" but that production would continue as planned. The following day CBS temporarily shut down production of both Hawaii Five-0 and Magnum P.I. until further notice. In a later interview Lenkov confirmed that CBS ordered additional episodes to the season bringing the count to 25. The season finale consisted of two episodes in a two-part story. The series was renewed by CBS for a tenth season on May 9, 2019, which premiered on September 27, 2019.

=== Filming ===
Filming for the season officially began on July 10, 2018, with a traditional Hawaiian blessing and concluded on April 19, 2019. Bryan Spicer returned as producing director and is expected to direct five episodes of the season. Primary filming for the season takes place in Honolulu, Hawaii, on the island of Oahu. The series holds a sound stage at Hawaii Film Studio in Diamond Head where it films many indoor scenes. Exterior shots and outdoor scenes for McGarrett's house are filmed at the Bayer Estate in Aina Haina. On July 11, 2018, it was revealed that the first episode to film would be third aired episode of the season. On July 20, 2018, Lenkov reported that Alex O' Loughlin would direct another episode. Filming on the first filmed episode of the season officially concluded on July 20, 2018. Meanwhile, filming was temporarily canceled in August 2018 as a result of an incoming hurricane. It was later revealed that O'Loughlin would direct the seventeenth episode of the season.

=== Casting ===
When asked about the mid-season finale, Lenkov stated, "We're bringing back a lot of people that over the years have helped us". On August 22, 2018, it was reported by TVLine that Rochelle Aytes had been cast in a guest role as a character named Greer. Mark Dacascos returned to the series as Wo Fat for the first time since the fifth season. It was later announced that Louis Gossett Jr. and Gladys Knight would guest star in an episode as the father and mother respectively of McBride's character, Lou Grover. On November 20, 2018, it was announced that Terry O'Quinn would return in the season's mid-season finale, while on December 4, 2018, it was reported that former main cast member Michelle Borth would return for the mid-season premiere. It was revealed on January 18, 2019, that Joan Collins guest starred in an episode as Amanda Savage. On March 6, 2019, it was reported that former main cast member Taryn Manning, who last appeared as a guest star in the sixth season, would be returning as Mary Ann McGarrett. Joey Lawrence, who appeared as a guest star in the eighth season, returned as a guest star in the two-part season finale. Series regular Ian Anthony Dale returned to the series in episode six due to conflicting filming of other CBS television series Salvation in which he was also a series regular.

== Release and marketing ==
The teaser trailer for the first episode was released on September 12, 2018. The season has been marketed as the series' fiftieth anniversary, being fifty years since the premiere of the original series in 1968. On August 13, 2018, it was announced that the season would have an advanced premiere screening along with an advanced premiere screening of Magnum P.I. The season premiered on September 28, 2018, in the 2018–19 television season. It held the same time slot of the previous five seasons airing Fridays at 9 p.m. ET, with the exception of the seventeenth episode which aired immediately after the sixteenth episode at 10 p.m. ET. The season concluded on May 17, 2019, after airing 25 episodes.

== Reception ==
=== Ratings ===
No.	Episode	Air date	18–49 rating	Viewers (millions)	Weekly rank	Live+7 18–49	Live+7 viewers (millions)
1	Ka ʻōwili ʻōka’i	September 28, 2018	0.9	7.49	—N/a	1.4	10.52
2	Ke Kanaka I Ha'ule Mai Ka Lewa Mai	October 5, 2018	0.8	7.39	25	1.3	10.10
3	Mimiki Ke Kai, Ahuwale Ka Papa Leho	October 12, 2018	0.8	7.68	20	—N/a	10.36
4	A'ohe Kio Pohaku Nalo i Ke Alo Pali	October 19, 2018	0.8	7.48	19	—N/a	10.11
5	A'ohe Mea 'Imi A Ka Maka	October 26, 2018	0.7	6.97	—N/a	1.1	9.57
6	Aia I Hi'Ikua; I Hi'Ialo	November 2, 2018	0.9	7.88	17	—N/a	10.58
7	Pua A'e La Ka Uwahi O Ka Moe	November 9, 2018	0.7	7.53	16	1.1	10.20
8	Lele pū nā manu like	November 16, 2018	0.8	7.88	17	1.4	10.64
9	Mai Ka Po Mai Ka 'oia'i'o	November 30, 2018	0.8	7.27	21	1.2	10.13
10	Pio ke kukui, po'ele ka hale	December 7, 2018	0.8	7.81	16	1.3	10.43
11	Hala i ke ala o'i'ole mai	January 4, 2019	0.8	7.19	11	1.3	10.02
12	Ka hauli o ka mea hewa 'ole, he nalowale koke	January 11, 2019	0.9	7.96	17	1.4	10.78
13	Ke iho mai nei ko luna	January 18, 2019	0.8	7.61	13	1.3	10.49
14	Ikliki i ka la o Keawalua	February 1, 2019	0.8	7.87	12	1.4	10.91
15	Ho'Opio 'Ia E Ka Noho Ali'I A Ka Ua	February 15, 2019	0.8	7.30	14	1.3	10.47
16	Hapai ke kuko, hanau ka hewa	February 22, 2019	0.8	7.11	17	1.3	9.87
17	E'ao lu'au a kualima	February 22, 2019	0.8	6.98	19	1.3	10.02
18	Ai no i ka 'ape he mane'o no ko ka nuku	March 8, 2019	0.9	7.27	13	1.4	10.22
19	Pupuhi ka he’e o kai uli	March 15, 2019	0.7	6.51	17	1.2	9.46
20	Ke ala o ka pu	April 5, 2019	0.8	6.84	19	1.3	9.88
21	He kama na ka pueo	April 12, 2019	0.7	6.87	13	1.1	9.66
22	O ke kumu, o ka mana, ho'opuka 'ia	April 26, 2019	0.7	6.62	13	1.1	9.49
23	Ho'okahi no la o ka malihini	May 3, 2019	0.7	6.77	15	1.1	9.33
24	Hewa ka lima	May 10, 2019	0.7	6.78	13	1.1	9.51
25	Hana Mao 'ole ka ua o Waianae	May 17, 2019	0.5	5.11	24	1.0	8.19

== Home media ==
Hawaii Five-0: The Ninth Season
Set details	Special features	
25 episodes; 6-disc set; 16:9 aspect ratio; Languages: English (Dolby Digital 5.1, with subtitles); Subtitles in English, Spanish, and Portuguese	Five-0@200; Giving Thanks; Shorelines: Season 9; Deleted/Extended Scenes; Gag Reel	
DVD release dates
Region 1	Region 2	Region 4
September 10, 2019	September 23, 2019	N/A
