= Ka ʻōwili ʻōkaʻi =

- Hawaii Five-0 episode
- Steve McGarrett being removed from the sensory deprivation tank inside the "Cocoon"
- Episode no.: Season 9 Episode 1
- Directed by: Bryan Spicer
- Written by: Leonard Freeman & Peter M. Lenkov
- Based on: "Cocoon" by Leonard Freeman
- Cinematography by: Kurt Jones
- Editing by: Roderick Davis
- Production code: 903
- Original air date: September 28, 2018
- Running time: 44 minutes

Guest appearances
- Mark Dacascos as Wo Fat; Rosalind Chao as Governor Mahoe; Shawn Thomsen as Pua Kai; Rochelle Aytes as Greer; Jack Coleman as Miller; Roger Yuan as Kang; Lamont Thompson as Kray; Susan Park as Rosemary

Episode chronology
← Previous "Waiho Wale Kahiko"	Next → "Ke Kanaka I Ha'ule Mai Ka Lewa Mai"
- Hawaii Five-0 (2010 TV series, season 9)

"Ka ʻōwili ʻōkaʻi" (Hawaiian for: "Cocoon") is the first episode of the ninth season of Hawaii Five-0. It aired on September 28, 2018, on CBS. The episode was written by Leonard Freeman and Peter M. Lenkov and was directed by Bryan Spicer. In the episode Steve is captured and placed in a sensory deprivation tank while the rest of the team attempts to rescue him. The episode is a remake of the 1968 episode of the same name.

== Plot ==
The episode opens with an unknown person inside a sensory deprivation tank. A team, led by Wo Fat, is instructed to remove the person who is then strapped to a table. Wo Fat cuts a mask off the person's face who is revealed to be Steve McGarrett and is pronounced dead by Wo Fat. The scene then restarts however this time, Steve is removed from the tank because he is hallucinating the Wo Fat scenario.

Two days earlier Steve and Junior are digging a hole in Steve's back yard to bury the investment money from Kamekona for Steve and Danny's restaurant. The team is then called into a case when a dead body washes ashore on a beach. Steve recognizes the body as Tom Hennessy, a former friend who helped him track down Victor Hesse, the killer of Steve's father. Steve and Danny visit Hennessy's apartment to investigate; they are met by an intruder. The three engage in a fist fight who is killed in the process. Upon continuing to investigate the apartment the CIA arrives, including Steve's ex-girlfriend Greer and her partner Miller to remove anything that could compromise a case.

After an autopsy Noelani informs Steve that traces of Gutta-percha were found in hair follicles of Hennessy's eyes, ears, and nose. At the Five-0 Headquarters the team begins to put together torn burnt pieces of paper found in Hennessy's fireplace. When meeting with Greer she informs Steve that there is possibly a mole inside the CIA. Five-0 is able to place together the words "Cocoon" and "SS Arcturus". Steve and Danny find a ship by the same name in a pier near where Hennessy's car was towed. Steve infiltrates the ship and finds a cocoon-like room which holds a sensory deprivation tank.

The Five-0 Task Force devises a plan to allow Steve to be captured by the members of the ship and plant false information with the CIA mole. Steve enters the ship and is drugged, prior to passing out Greer is revealed to be the mole. Steve is placed inside the tank and moments later he begins hallucinating. During a shootout between law enforcement and the ship's armed guards, Steve manages to escape detainment and fights off his kidnappers. The rest of the Five-0 team shortly finds Steve and informs him that they were forced to let Greer escape assuming she took the bait.

=== Continuity ===
The episode begins a loose story arc that concludes in the following episode, "Ke Kanaka I Ha'ule Mai Ka Lewa Mai".

== Production ==
It’s definitely not scene-by-scene, but it’s faithful to the story. I wanted to do something very special for the 50th anniversary. The way to make it was to retell the pilot of that show.

— Peter M. Lenkov

=== Development ===
On August 5, 2018, it was revealed that the episode would be a remake of the pilot from the original series, Hawaii Five-O, also entitled "Cocoon".

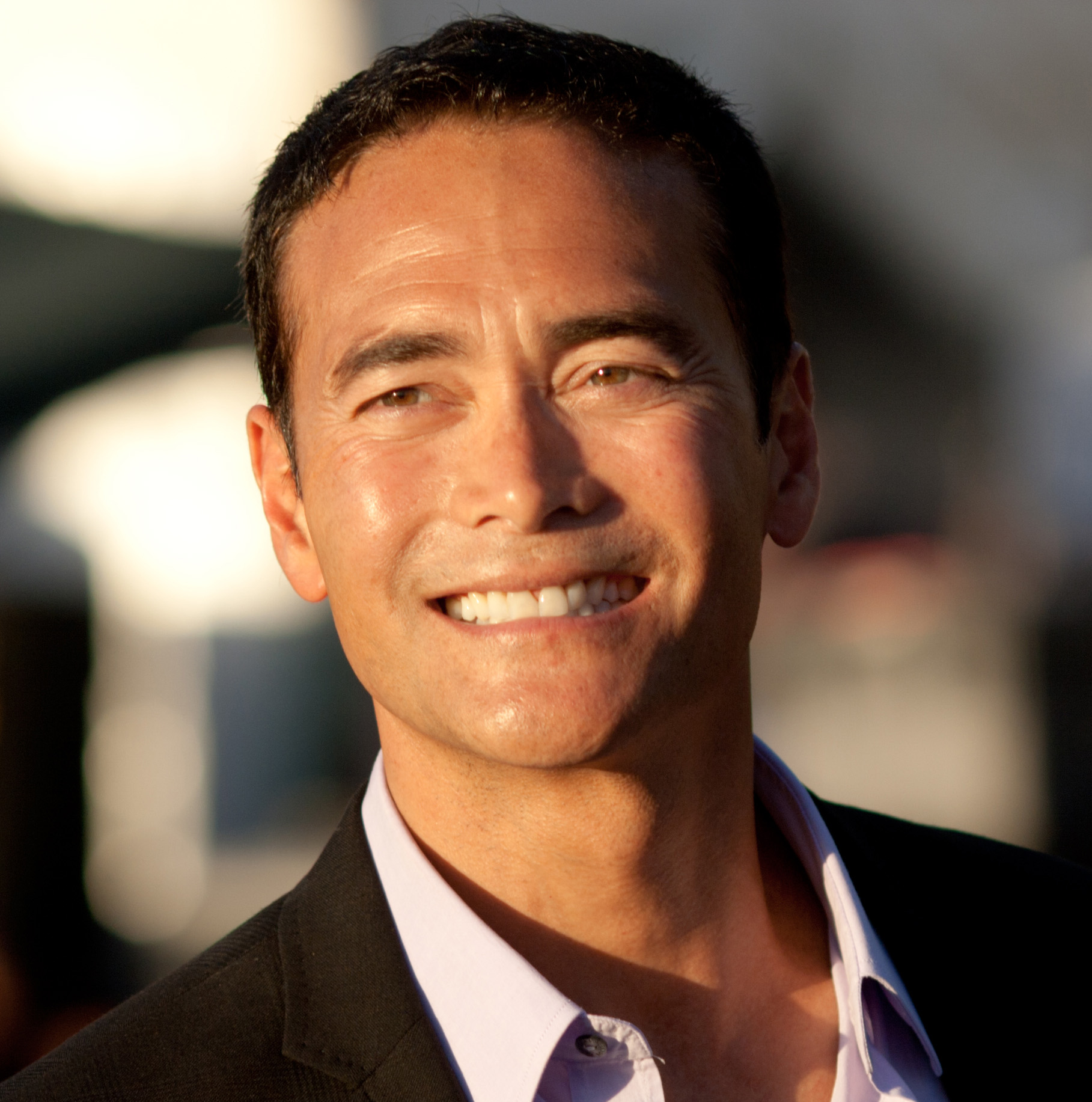
Mark Dacascos returned as Wo Fat for the first time since the season 5 episode "Ina Paha".

=== Casting ===
On August 22, 2018, it was reported by TVLine that Rochelle Aytes had been cast in a guest role as a character named Greer. The character portrays a CIA operative and a former romantic interest of O'Loughlin's character, Steve McGarrett. Mark Dacascos returned as Wo Fat for the first time since the season 5 episode "Ina Paha".

Despite being credited in the opening title sequence Ian Anthony Dale, Taylor Wily, and Dennis Chun were absent from the episode.

=== Promotion ===
The teaser trailer for the episode was released on September 12, 2018 while three additional promos were released prior to the premiere on September 26 and 28.

On August 13, 2018, it was announced that the season would have an advanced premiere screening along with and advanced premiere screening Magnum P.I.. The annual event known as "Sunset on the Beach", featuring interviews with the cast and crew as well as a special performance by Cyndi Lauper, was scheduled to take place on September 14, 2018, at Waikiki beach in Honolulu, Hawaii. It was later rescheduled to September 16 as a result of the Category 4 Hurricane Olivia.

== Reception ==
=== Viewing figures ===
The episode aired on September 28, 2018, and was watched live and same day by 7.49 million viewers. Within seven days, by means of DVR and video on demand services the total number of viewers rose to 10.52 million.

=== Critical reception ===
Reviews toward the episode were mostly positive. TV Fanatic gave the episode an editorial rating of 4.0 out of 5; and a user rating of 3.9 out of 5 based on twenty-six reviews. On IMDb the episode 8.2 out of 10 based on 110 reviews.

== Broadcast and streaming ==
The episode is available to watch on demand through the CBS website with a CBS All Access subscription. It is also available for individual purchase on Amazon, iTunes, and Vudu.

== See also ==
- List of Hawaii Five-0 (2010 TV series) episodes
- Hawaii Five-0 (2010 TV series) season 9
