= List of Hawaii Five-0 (2010 TV series) episodes =

Hawaii Five-0 is a police procedural series developed for television by Alex Kurtzman, Roberto Orci, and Peter M. Lenkov, a reboot of the 1968 series of the same name created by Leonard Freeman. It premiered on CBS on Monday, September 20, 2010, 42 years to the day from the premiere of the original show, September 20, 1968. The title of each episode (except the pilot and the season 3 episode "Hookman") is in Hawaiian rather than English.

The series covers the actions of a small special state task force created by the Governor of Hawaii, Pat Jameson, to investigate serious crimes throughout the Islands, as Hawaii does not have a conventional state police force. The team is headed by Lieutenant Commander Steve McGarrett, USNR (and former Navy SEAL) as it investigates crimes ranging from terrorism to kidnapping. McGarrett chooses as his partner Honolulu PD (and former Newark PD) Detective Danny Williams, and together McGarrett and Williams lead a team that includes Capt. Lou Grover, Adam Noshimuri, Quinn Liu, Junior Reigns and Tani Rey.

During the course of the series, 240 episodes of Hawaii Five-0 aired over ten seasons, between September 20, 2010, and April 3, 2020.

== Series overview ==
Season	Episodes	Originally released		Rank	Rating	Average viewership (in millions)
Season	Episodes	First released	Last released	Rank	Rating	Average viewership (in millions)
1	24	September 20, 2010	May 16, 2011	22	7.5	11.26
2	23	September 19, 2011	May 14, 2012	26	7.6	11.83
3	24	September 24, 2012	May 20, 2013	35	6.8	10.36
4	22	September 27, 2013	May 9, 2014	21	7.5	11.66
5	25	September 26, 2014	May 8, 2015	20	7.8	12.28
6	25	September 25, 2015	May 13, 2016	25	7.0	11.04
7	25	September 23, 2016	May 12, 2017	15	7.6	12.15
8	25	September 29, 2017	May 18, 2018	18	6.8	11.00
9	25	September 28, 2018	May 17, 2019	26	6.2	10.01
10	22	September 27, 2019	April 3, 2020	20	9.7	7.19

== Episodes ==
=== Season 1 (2010–11) ===
No. overall	No. in season	Title	Directed by	Written by	Original release date	Prod. code	U.S. viewers (millions)
1	1	"Pilot"	Len Wiseman	Story by : Alex Kurtzman & Roberto Orci & Peter M. Lenkov; Teleplay by : Peter M. Lenkov	September 20, 2010	101	14.20
2	2	"ʻOhana" "Family"	Brad Turner	Sarah Goldfinger & Paul Zbyszewski	September 27, 2010	103	12.72
3	3	"Malama Ka ʻAina" "Respect the Land"	Paul Edwards	Carol Barbee & Kyle Harimoto	October 4, 2010	102	12.24
4	4	"Lanakila" "Victory"	Alex Zakrzewski	Peter M. Lenkov & Alex Kurtzman & Roberto Orci	October 11, 2010	105	10.69
5	5	"Nalowale" "Forgotten/Missing"	Brad Turner	J. R. Orci & David Wolkove	October 18, 2010	104	10.94
6	6	"Koʻolauloa" "North Shore of Oʻahu"	Matt Earl Beesley	Carol Barbee & Kyle Harimoto	October 25, 2010	106	10.23
7	7	"Hoʻapono" "Accept"	James Whitmore Jr.	Peter M. Lenkov & Jim Galasso	November 1, 2010	107	10.86
8	8	"Manaʻo" "Belief"	Matt Earl Beesley	Paul Zbyszewski & Jim Galasso	November 8, 2010	108	10.23
9	9	"Poʻipu" "The Siege"	Brad Turner	Story by : Peter M. Lenkov & Shane Salerno; Teleplay by : Shane Salerno	November 15, 2010	109	10.34
10	10	"Heihei" "Race"	Elodie Keene	Sarah Goldfinger	November 22, 2010	110	12.34
11	11	"Palekaiko" "Paradise"	Frederick E. O. Toye	David Wolkove & J. R. Orci	December 6, 2010	111	10.51
12	12	"Hana ʻaʻa Makehewa" "Desperate Measures"	Chris Fisher	Story by : Peter M. Lenkov; Teleplay by : Carol Barbee & Kyle Harimoto	December 13, 2010	112	10.91
13	13	"Ke Kinohi" "The Beginning"	Brad Turner	Story by : Peter M. Lenkov; Teleplay by : Nicole Ranadive	January 3, 2011	113	11.00
14	14	"He Kane Hewaʻole" "An Innocent Man"	Chris Fisher	Peter M. Lenkov & Paul Zbyszewski	January 17, 2011	114	10.83
15	15	"Kai eʻe" "Tidal Wave"	Duane Clark	Melissa Glenn & Jessica Rieder	January 23, 2011	115	19.34
16	16	"E Malama" "To Protect"	Brad Turner	Story by : Carol Barbee; Teleplay by : Kyle Harimoto & Shane Salerno	February 7, 2011	116	11.01
17	17	"Powa Maka Moana" "Pirate"	Brad Turner	Joe Halpin	February 14, 2011	117	10.73
18	18	"Loa Aloha" "The Long Goodbye"	Eric Laneuville	Paul Zbyszewski & Mike Schaub	February 21, 2011	118	10.45
19	19	"Ne Meʻe Laua Na Paio" "Heroes and Villains"	Matt Earl Beesley	J. R. Orci & David Wolkove	March 21, 2011	119	10.01
20	20	"Ma Ke Kahakai" "Shore"	Larry Teng	Elwood Reid	April 11, 2011	120	9.54
21	21	"Hoʻopaʻi" "Revenge"	Duane Clark	Story by : Shane Salerno & Peter M. Lenkov; Teleplay by : Shane Salerno	April 18, 2011	121	11.44
22	22	"Hoʻohuli Naʻau" "Close to Heart"	Brad Turner	Story by : Peter M. Lenkov; Teleplay by : Kyle Harimoto	May 2, 2011	122	9.83
23	23	"Ua Hiki Mai Kapalena Pau" "Until the End is Near"	Steve Boyum	Story by : Peter M. Lenkov; Teleplay by : David Wolkove	May 9, 2011	123	9.45
24	24	"Oia'i'o" "Trust"	Brad Turner	Peter M. Lenkov & Paul Zbyszewski	May 16, 2011	124	10.41

=== Season 2 (2011–12) ===
No. overall	No. in season	Title	Directed by	Written by	Original release date	Prod. code	U.S. viewers (millions)
25	1	"Haʻiʻole" "Unbreakable"	Steve Boyum	Peter M. Lenkov & Paul Zbyszewski	September 19, 2011	201	12.19
26	2	"Ua Lawe Wale" "Taken"	Duane Clark	Melissa Glenn & Jessica Rieder	September 26, 2011	202	11.26
27	3	"Kameʻe" "The Hero"	Jeffrey Hunt	Elwood Reid	October 3, 2011	203	11.07
28	4	"Mea Makamae" "Treasure"	Duane Clark	David Wolkove	October 10, 2011	204	10.07
29	5	"Maʻemaʻe" "Clean"	Steve Boyum	Stephanie Sengupta	October 17, 2011	205	11.07
30	6	"Ka Hakaka Maikaʻi" "The Good Fight"	Larry Teng	Kyle Harimoto	October 24, 2011	206	10.70
31	7	"Ka Iwi Kapu" "Sacred Bones"	Joe Dante	Michele Fazekas & Tara Butters	October 31, 2011	207	10.60
32	8	"Lapaʻau" "Healing"	Steve Boyum	Joe Halpin	November 7, 2011	208	10.32
33	9	"Ike Maka" "Identity"	Bryan Spicer	Mike Schaub	November 14, 2011	209	11.71
34	10	"Kiʻilua" "Deceiver"	Kate Woods	Peter M. Lenkov & Paul Zbyszewski	November 21, 2011	210	10.59
35	11	"Pahele" "Trap"	Paul Edwards	Melissa Glenn & Jessica Rieder	December 5, 2011	211	11.01
36	12	"Alaheo Pauʻole" "Gone Forever"	Jeff T. Thomas	Elwood Reid	December 12, 2011	212	11.17
37	13	"Ka Hoʻoponopono" "The Fix"	Steve Boyum	Stephanie Sengupta	January 2, 2012	213	11.90
38	14	"Puʻolo" "The Package"	Christine Moore	David Wolkove	January 16, 2012	214	10.73
39	15	"Mai Ka Wa Kahiko" "Out of the Past"	Larry Teng	Bill Nuss	February 6, 2012	215	9.97
40	16	"I Helu Pu" "The Reckoning"	Eric Laneuville	Paul Zbyszewski	February 13, 2012	216	9.70
41	17	"Kupale" "Defender"	Steve Boyum	Noah Nelson & Lisa Schultz	February 20, 2012	217	10.40
42	18	"Lekio" "Radio"	Bryan Spicer	Kyle Harimoto	February 27, 2012	218	9.58
43	19	"Kalele" "Faith"	Frederick E. O. Toye	Joe Halpin	March 19, 2012	219	9.31
44	20	"Haʻalele" "Abandoned"	Jerry Levine	Elwood Reid	April 9, 2012	220	10.30
45	21	"Pa Make Loa" "Touch of Death"	Bryan Spicer	Michele Fazekas & Tara Butters & R. Scott Gemmill	April 30, 2012	221	10.91
46	22	"Ua Hopu" "Caught"	Larry Teng	Stephanie Sengupta	May 7, 2012	222	9.39
47	23	"Ua Hala" "Death in the Family"	Steve Boyum	Peter M. Lenkov & Paul Zbyszewski & Elwood Reid	May 14, 2012	223	11.42

=== Season 3 (2012–13) ===
No. overall	No. in season	Title	Directed by	Written by	Original release date	Prod. code	U.S. viewers (millions)
48	1	"La O Na Makuahine" "Mother's Day"	Bryan Spicer	Peter M. Lenkov	September 24, 2012	301	8.06
49	2	"Kanalua" "Doubt"	Frederick E. O. Toye	Joe Halpin	October 1, 2012	302	7.95
50	3	"Lana I Ka Moana" "Adrift"	Steve Boyum	Elwood Reid	October 8, 2012	303	8.39
51	4	"Popilikia" "Misfortune"	Christine Moore	Stephanie Sengupta	October 15, 2012	304	8.70
52	5	"Mohai" "Offering"	Jerry Levine	Story by : Peter M. Lenkov & David Wolkove; Teleplay by : David Wolkove	November 5, 2012	307	7.53
53	6	"I Ka Wa Mamua" "In a Time Past"	Sylvain White	Story by : Peter M. Lenkov; Teleplay by : Ken Solarz	November 12, 2012	305	7.96
54	7	"Ohuna" "The Secret"	Larry Teng	Mike Schaub	November 19, 2012	306	9.02
55	8	"Wahineʻinoloa" "Evil Woman"	Steve Boyum	Story by : Stephanie Sengupta & Courtney Kemp Agboh; Teleplay by : Stephanie Sengupta	November 26, 2012	308	10.30
56	9	"Haʻawe Make Loa" "Death Wish"	Gwyneth Horder-Payton	Bill Haynes	December 3, 2012	311	9.32
57	10	"Huakaʻi Kula" "Field Trip"	Eric Laneuville	Michele Fazekas & Tara Butters	December 10, 2012	309	9.84
58	11	"Kahu" "Guardian"	Bryan Spicer	Noah Nelson	December 17, 2012	312	10.54
59	12	"Kapu" "Forbidden"	Steven DePaul	David Wolkove	January 14, 2013	313	9.59
60	13	"Olelo HoʻOpaʻI Make" "Death Sentence"	Bryan Spicer	Steve Cwik	January 20, 2013	314	13.03
61	14	"Hana I WaʻIa" "Scandal"	Larry Teng	Mike Schaub	January 21, 2013	310	9.85
62	15	"Hookman"	Peter Weller	Story by : Glen Olson & Rod Baker; Teleplay by : Joe Halpin	February 4, 2013	315	9.86
63	16	"Kekoa" "Warrior"	Larry Teng	Al Septien & Turi Meyer	February 11, 2013	316	9.64
64	17	"Paʻani" "The Game"	Jeffrey Hunt	Kyle Harimoto & David Wolkove	February 18, 2013	317	9.11
65	18	"Na Kiʻi" "Dolls"	Duane Clark	Story by : Michael Reisz; Teleplay by : Stephanie Sengupta	March 18, 2013	318	8.99
66	19	"Hoa Pili" "Close Friend"	Jeff Cadiente	Story by : Richard Arthur & Kyle Harimoto; Teleplay by : Kyle Harimoto	March 25, 2013	319	8.61
67	20	"Olelo Paʻa" "The Promise"	Joe Dante	Peter M. Lenkov & Ken Solarz	April 15, 2013	320	7.65
68	21	"Imi Loko Ka ʻUhane" "Seek Within One's Soul"	Bryan Spicer	Bill Haynes	April 29, 2013	321	7.76
69	22	"Hoʻopio" "To Take Captive"	Steve Boyum	Story by : Peter M. Lenkov; Teleplay by : Noah Nelson	May 6, 2013	322	8.01
70	23	"He Welo ʻOihana" "Family Business"	Larry Teng	Eric Guggenheim	May 13, 2013	323	7.86
71	24	"Aloha, Malama Pono" "Farewell and Take Care"	Bryan Spicer	Peter M. Lenkov & Ken Solarz & David Wolkove	May 20, 2013	324	9.00

=== Season 4 (2013–14) ===
No. overall	No. in season	Title	Directed by	Written by	Original release date	Prod. code	U.S. viewers (millions)
72	1	"Aloha Ke Kahi I Ke Kahi" "We Need Each Another"	Bryan Spicer	Peter M. Lenkov & Ken Solarz	September 27, 2013	401	9.46
73	2	"Aʻale Maʻa Wau" "Fish Out of Water"	Joe Dante	John Dove	October 4, 2013	402	9.75
74	3	"Kaʻoia iʻo Ma Loko" "The Truth Within"	Duane Clark	Steven Lilien & Bryan Wynbrandt	October 11, 2013	403	9.24
75	4	"A ia la aku" "From This Day Forward"	Bryan Spicer	Christina M. Kim & David Wolkove	October 18, 2013	404	8.81
76	5	"Kupuʻeu" "Fallen Hero"	Jeffrey Hunt	Moira Kirland & Eric Guggenheim	October 25, 2013	405	9.46
77	6	"Kupouli ʻla" "Broken"	John Terlesky	Sue Palmer & David Wolkove	November 1, 2013	406	9.71
78	7	"Ua Nalohia" "In Deep"	Joe Dante	Story by : John Dove & Noah Nelson; Teleplay by : Bradley Paul	November 8, 2013	407	9.51
79	8	"Akanahe" "Reluctant Partners"	Jerry Levine	Steven Lilien & Bryan Wynbrandt	November 15, 2013	408	9.90
80	9	"Hauʻoli La HoʻomaikaʻI" "Happy Thanksgiving"	Allison Liddi-Brown	Eric Guggenheim & Moira Kirland	November 22, 2013	409	9.92
81	10	"Hoʻonani Makuakane" "Honor Thy Father"	Larry Teng	Peter M. Lenkov & Ken Solarz	December 13, 2013	410	9.13
82	11	"Pukana" "Keepsake"	Bryan Spicer	Bill Haynes	December 20, 2013	411	9.62
83	12	"O kela me keia Manawa" "Now and Then"	Peter Weller	John Dove	January 10, 2014	412	10.74
84	13	"Hana Lokomaikaʻi" "The Favor"	Sylvain White	Story by : Peter M. Tassler; Teleplay by : Peter M. Lenkov & Ken Solarz	January 17, 2014	413	10.63
85	14	"Na hala a ka makua" "Sins of the Father"	Peter Weller	David Wolkove	January 31, 2014	414	11.24
86	15	"Pale ʻla" "Buried Secrets"	Jerry Levine	Moira Kirkland	February 28, 2014	415	10.61
87	16	"Hoku Welowelo" "Fire in the Sky"	Jeffrey Hunt	Steven Lilien & Bryan Wynbrandt	March 7, 2014	416	10.35
88	17	"Ma Lalo o ka ʻili" "Beneath the Surface"	Bryan Spicer	Story by : Bill Haynes; Teleplay by : Bill Haynes & John Dove	March 14, 2014	417	9.53
89	18	"Hoʻi Hou" "Reunited"	Sylvain White	Christina M. Kim	April 4, 2014	418	9.67
90	19	"Ku I Ka Pili Koko" "Blood Brothers"	Maja Vrvilo	Story by : David Wolkove; Teleplay by : Steven Lilien & Bryan Wynbrandt	April 11, 2014	419	9.17
91	20	"Peʻepeʻe Kanaka" "Those Among Us"	Jeff Cadiente	John Dove	April 25, 2014	420	9.26
92	21	"Makani ʻolu a holo malie" "Fair Winds and Following Seas"	Jeffrey Hunt	Story by : Peter M. Lenkov & Ken Solarz & Eric Guggenheim; Teleplay by : Eric Guggenheim	May 2, 2014	421	8.77
93	22	"O ka PiliʻOhana ka ʻOi" "Family Comes First"	Bryan Spicer	Peter M. Lenkov & Ken Solarz	May 9, 2014	422	9.21

=== Season 5 (2014–15) ===
No. overall	No. in season	Title	Directed by	Written by	Original release date	Prod. code	U.S. viewers (millions)
94	1	"Aʻohe Kahi e Peʻe Ai" "Nowhere to Hide"	Bryan Spicer	Peter M. Lenkov & Ken Solarz	September 26, 2014	501	8.97
95	2	"Ka Makuakane" "Family Man"	Sylvain White	Steven Lilien & Bryan Wynbrandt	October 3, 2014	502	9.77
96	3	"Kanalu Hope Loa" "The Last Break"	Joe Dante	Sarah Byrd	October 10, 2014	503	9.19
97	4	"Ka Noeʻau" "The Painter"	Peter Weller	Peter M. Lenkov & Ken Solarz	October 17, 2014	504	9.18
98	5	"Hoʻoilina" "Legacy"	Bryan Spicer	Eric Guggenheim	October 24, 2014	505	8.92
99	6	"Hoʻomaʻike" "Unmasked"	Joe Dante	Story by : David Wolkove; Teleplay by : Steven Lilien & Bryan Wynbrandt	October 31, 2014	506	9.47
100	7	"Ina Paha" "If Perhaps"	Larry Teng	Peter M. Lenkov	November 7, 2014	507	8.95
101	8	"Ka Hana Malu" "Inside Job"	Jerry Levine	Moira Kirland	November 21, 2014	508	10.07
102	9	"Ke Koho Mamao Aku" "Longshot"	Bryan Spicer	Sue Palmer	December 12, 2014	509	8.77
103	10	"Wawahi moeʻuhane" "Broken Dreams"	Sylvain White	Story by : Peter M. Lenkov; Teleplay by : Steven Lilien & Bryan Wynbrandt	January 2, 2015	510	10.51
104	11	"Uaʻaihue" "Stolen"	Jeffrey Hunt	David Wolkove	January 9, 2015	511	11.50
105	12	"Poina ʻOle" "Not Forgotten"	Brad Tanenbaum	John Dove	January 16, 2015	512	10.59
106	13	"Lā Pōʻino" "Doomsday"	Maja Vrvilo	Story by : Peter M. Lenkov; Teleplay by : Sarah Byrd	January 30, 2015	513	10.50
107	14	"Powehiwehi" "Blackout"	Peter Weller	Story by : Travis Donnelly; Teleplay by : Eric Guggenheim	February 6, 2015	514	10.08
108	15	"E ʻImi pono" "Searching for the Truth"	Allison Liddi-Brown	Kenny Kyle	February 13, 2015	515	9.81
109	16	"Nanahu" "Embers"	Joe Dante	Story by : Akeba Gaddis Lynn; Teleplay by : John Dove	February 20, 2015	516	10.66
110	17	"Kukaʻawale" "Stakeout"	Daniel Dae Kim	David Wolkove & Lorenzo Manetti	February 27, 2015	517	9.79
111	18	"Pono Kaulike" "Justice for All"	Larry Teng	Peter M. Lenkov & Ken Solarz	March 6, 2015	518	9.54
112	19	"Kahania" "Close Shave"	Jerry Levine	Steven Lilien & Bryan Wynbrandt	March 13, 2015	519	9.38
113	20	"ʻIke Hanau" "Instinct"	Maja Vrvilo	Story by : Peter M. Lenkov & Peter M. Tassler; Teleplay by : Moira Kirland & Eric Guggenheim	April 3, 2015	520	8.87
114	21	"Ua heleleʻi ka hoku" "Fallen Star"	James Wilcox	David Wolkove	April 10, 2015	521	8.70
115	22	"Hoʻamoano" "Chasing Yesterday"	Stephen Herek	John Dove	April 24, 2015	522	8.35
116	23	"Moʻo ʻolelo Pu" "Sharing Traditions"	Eagle Egilsson	Story by : Peter M. Lenkov and Ken Solarz; Teleplay by : Jessica Granger	May 1, 2015	523	8.60
117	24	"Luapoʻi" "Prey"	Maja Vrvilo	Eric Guggenheim	May 8, 2015	524	8.57
118	25	"A Make Kāua" "Until We Die"	Bryan Spicer	Story by : Peter M. Lenkov; Teleplay by : Steven Lilien & Bryan Wynbrandt	May 8, 2015	525	8.27

=== Season 6 (2015–16) ===
No. overall	No. in season	Title	Directed by	Written by	Original release date	Prod. code	U.S. viewers (millions)
119	1	"Mai ho`oni i ka wai lana mālie" "Do Not Disturb the Water That Is Tranquil"	Bryan Spicer	Peter M. Lenkov & Eric Guggenheim	September 25, 2015	601	8.30
120	2	"Lehu a Lehu" "Ashes to Ashes"	Sylvain White	John Dove	October 2, 2015	602	9.24
121	3	"Ua 'o'oloku ke anu i na mauna" "The Chilling Storm Is on the Mountains"	Joe Dante	Story by : Peter M. Lenkov; Teleplay by : Steven Lilien & Bryan Wynbrandt	October 9, 2015	603	8.97
122	4	"Ka Papahana Holo Pono" "Best Laid Plans"	Maja Vrvilo	Eric Guggenheim & David Wolkove	October 16, 2015	604	9.08
123	5	"Ka 'alapahi nui" "Big Lie"	Eagle Egilsson	David Wolkove & Sue Palmer	October 23, 2015	605	8.60
124	6	"Na Pilikua Nui" "Monsters"	Joe Dante	Matt Wheeler	October 30, 2015	606	8.35
125	7	"Na Kama Hele" "Day Trippers"	Hanelle Culpepper	Ken Solarz	November 6, 2015	607	8.85
126	8	"Piko Pau 'iole" "The Artful Dodger"	Joel Surnow	Story by : Peter M. Lenkov; Teleplay by : Steven Lilien & Bryan Wynbrandt	November 13, 2015	608	8.47
127	9	"Hana Keaka" "Charade"	Bobby Roth	Carmen Pilar Golden	November 20, 2015	609	9.10
128	10	"Ka Makau kaa kaua" "The Sweet Science"	Bryan Spicer	John Dove	December 11, 2015	610	8.13
129	11	"Kuleana" "One's Personal Sense of Responsibility"	Sylvain White	David Wolkove	January 8, 2016	611	9.41
130	12	"Ua ola loko i ke aloha" "Love Gives Life Within"	Maja Vrvilo	Story by : Steve Douglas-Craig; Teleplay by : John Dove & Eric Guggenheim	January 15, 2016	612	9.48
131	13	"Umia Ka Hanu" "Hold The Breath"	Stephen Herek	Peter M. Lenkov & Eric Guggenheim	January 22, 2016	613	10.07
132	14	"Hoa 'inea" "Misery Loves Company"	Peter Weller	Matt Wheeler	February 12, 2016	614	8.88
133	15	"Ke Koa Lokomaika'i" "The Good Soldier"	Bryan Spicer	Carmen Pilar Golden & Sue Palmer	February 19, 2016	615	8.86
134	16	"Ka Pohaku Kihi Pa'a" "The Solid Cornerstone"	Jerry Levine	Story by : Peter M. Lenkov; Teleplay by : Steven Lilien & Bryan Wynbrandt	February 26, 2016	616	8.30
135	17	"Waiwai" "Assets"	Maja Vrvilo	Eric Guggenheim	March 11, 2016	617	7.97
136	18	"Kanaka Hahai" "The Hunter"	Eagle Egilsson	Story by : Travis Donnelly; Teleplay by : Matt Wheeler	April 1, 2016	618	8.45
137	19	"Malama ka Po'e" "Care For One's People"	Brad Tanenbaum	Ken Solarz & Bill Haynes	April 8, 2016	619	8.63
138	20	"Ka Haunaele" "Rampage"	Jerry Levine	Story by : Steven Lilien & Bryan Wynbrandt; Teleplay by : Sean O'Reilly	April 15, 2016	620	8.34
139	21	"Ka Pono Ku’oko’a" "The Cost of Freedom"	Peter Weller	John Dove	April 22, 2016	621	8.01
140	22	"I'ike Ke Ao" "For the World to Know"	Bryan Spicer	David Wolkove	April 29, 2016	622	8.41
141	23	"Pilina Koko" "Blood Ties"	Maja Vrvilo	Eric Guggenheim	May 6, 2016	623	8.56
142	24	"Pa'a Ka 'ipuka I Ka 'Upena Nananana" "The Entrance Is Stopped with a Spider's Web"	Stephen Herek	Steven Lilien & Bryan Wynbrandt	May 13, 2016	624	8.49
143	25	"O Ke Ali'i Wale No Ka'u Makemake" "My Desire Is Only for the Chief"	Bryan Spicer	Peter M. Lenkov & Matt Wheeler	May 13, 2016	625	8.82

=== Season 7 (2016–17) ===
No. overall	No. in season	Title	Directed by	Written by	Original release date	Prod. code	U.S. viewers (millions)
144	1	"Makaukau 'oe e Pa'ani?" "Ready to Play?"	Bryan Spicer	Peter M. Lenkov & Eric Guggenheim	September 23, 2016	701	10.22
145	2	"No Ke Ali'i Wahine A Me Ka 'Aina" "For Queen and Country"	Sylvain White	David Wolkove & Matt Wheeler	September 30, 2016	702	9.73
146	3	"He Moho Hou" "New Player"	Bryan Spicer	Peter M. Lenkov & Cyrus Nowrasteh	October 7, 2016	703	9.65
147	4	"Hu a'e ke ahi lanakila a Kamaile" "The Fire of Kamile Rises in Triumph"	Bronwen Hughes	Peter M. Lenkov & Cyrus Nowrasteh	October 14, 2016	704	9.19
148	5	"Ke Ku 'Ana" "The Stand"	Bobby Roth	Jason Gavin & Derek Santos Olson	October 21, 2016	705	9.51
149	6	"Ka hale ho'okauwel" "House of Horrors"	Ron Underwood	David Wolkove & Matt Wheeler	October 28, 2016	706	8.50
150	7	"Ka Makuahine A Me Ke Keikikane" "Mother and Son"	Bryan Spicer	Eric Guggenheim & David Wolkove	November 4, 2016	707	9.48
151	8	"Hana Komo Pae" "Rite of Passage"	Brad Tanenbaum	Rob Hanning	November 11, 2016	708	9.84
152	9	"Elua la ma Nowemapa" "Two Days in November"	Maja Vrvilo	Sean Farina	November 18, 2016	709	10.09
153	10	"Ka Luhi" "The Burden"	Carlos Bernard	Helen Shang & Zoe Robyn	December 9, 2016	710	9.40
154	11	"Ka'ili Aku" "Snatchback"	Jennifer Lynch	Matt Wheeler	December 16, 2016	711	9.46
155	12	"Ka 'Aelike" "The Deal"	Joe Dante	David Wolkove & Matt Wheeler	January 6, 2017	712	10.10
156	13	"Ua ho'i ka 'opua i Awalua" "The Clouds Always Return to Awalua"	Jim Jost	Cyrus Nowrasteh	January 13, 2017	713	9.69
157	14	"Ka laina ma ke one" "Line in the Sand"	Peter Weller	Sean O'Reilly	January 20, 2017	714	8.42
158	15	"Ka Pa'ani Nui" "Big Game"	Bryan Spicer	Helen Shang	February 3, 2017	715	9.81
159	16	"Poniu I Ke Aloha" "Crazy in Love"	Jerry Levine	David Wolkove & Matt Wheeler	February 10, 2017	716	9.86
160	17	"Hahai i na pilikua nui" "Hunting Monsters"	Roderick Davis	Rob Hanning	February 17, 2017	717	9.62
161	18	"E Malama Pono" "Handle with Care"	Eagle Egilsson	Zoe Robyn	February 24, 2017	718	9.12
162	19	"Puka 'ana" "Exodus"	Bronwen Hughes	Eric Guggenheim	March 10, 2017	719	9.20
163	20	"Huikau Na Makau A Ka Lawai'a" "The Fishhooks of the Fishers become Entangled"	Jerry Levine	Matt Wheeler	March 31, 2017	720	8.74
164	21	"Ua Malo'o Ka Wai" "The Water Is Dried Up"	Eagle Egilsson	Peter M. Lenkov & Eric Guggenheim	April 7, 2017	721	8.77
165	22	"Waimaka 'Ele'ele" "Black Tears"	Bryan Spicer	David Wolkove	April 14, 2017	722	8.49
166	23	"Wehe 'ana" "Prelude"	Maja Vrvilo	Helen Shang & Zoe Robyn	April 28, 2017	723	8.06
167	24	"He ke'u na ka 'alae a Hin" "A Croaking by Hina's Mudhen"	Krishna Rao	Rob Hanning	May 5, 2017	725	8.01
168	25	"Ua Mau Ke Ea O Ka Aina I Ka Pono" "The Life of the Land Is Perpetuated in Righteousness"	Bryan Spicer	Peter M. Lenkov & Eric Guggenheim	May 12, 2017	724	8.22

=== Season 8 (2017–18) ===
No. overall	No. in season	Title	Directed by	Written by	Original release date	Prod. code	U.S. viewers (millions)
169	1	"A'ole e 'olelo mai ana ke ahi ua ana ia" "Fire Will Never Say that It Has Had Enough"	Bryan Spicer	Peter M. Lenkov & Eric Guggenheim & Rob Hanning	September 29, 2017	801	8.64
170	2	"Na La 'Ilio" "Dog Days"	Tara Miele	David Wolkove & Matt Wheeler	October 6, 2017	803	8.53
171	3	"Kau pahi, ko'u kua. Kau pu, ko'u po'o." "Your Knife, My Back. My Gun, Your Head."	Eagle Egilsson	David Wolkove & Matt Wheeler	October 13, 2017	802	8.51
172	4	"E uhi wale no 'a'ole e nalo, he imu puhi" "No Matter How Much One Covers a Steaming Imu, The Smoke Will Rise"	Antonio Negret	Rob Hanning	October 20, 2017	804	8.67
173	5	"Kama'oma'o, ka 'aina huli hana" "At Kama'oma'o, The Land of Activities"	Bronwen Hughes	Peter M. Lenkov & Eric Guggenheim	November 3, 2017	805	8.63
174	6	"Mohala I Ka Wai Ka Maka O Ka Pua" "Unfolded by the Water Are the Faces of the Flowers"	Carlos Bernard	Eric Guggenheim & Zoe Robyn	November 10, 2017	808	9.21
175	7	"Kau Ka ‘Onohi Ali’i I Luna" "The Royal Eyes Rest Above"	Bryan Spicer	Peter M. Lenkov & Eric Guggenheim	November 17, 2017	807	9.17
176	8	"He Kaha Lu'u Ke Ala, Mai Ho'okolo Aku" "The Trail Leads to a Diving Place; Do Not Follow After"	Ron Underwood	Liz Alper & Ally Seibert	December 1, 2017	806	8.56
177	9	"Make Me Kai" "Death at Sea"	Maja Vrvilo	David Wolkove & Matt Wheeler	December 8, 2017	809	9.07
178	10	"I Ka Wa Ma Mua, I Ka Wa Ma Hope" "The Future Is in the Past"	Peter Weller	Zoe Robyn	December 15, 2017	810	8.48
179	11	"Oni Kalalea Ke Ku A Ka La'au Loa" "A Tall Tree Stands Above the Others"	Tara Miele	Rob Hanning	December 15, 2017	811	7.71
180	12	"Ka Hopu Nui 'Ana" "The Round Up"	Eagle Egilsson	David Wolkove & Matt Wheeler	January 5, 2018	812	9.96
181	13	"O Ka Mea Ua Hala, Ua Hala Ia" "What Is Gone Is Gone"	Roderick Davis	Sean O'Reilly	January 12, 2018	813	9.38
182	14	"Na Keiki A Kalaihaohia" "The Children of Kalaihaohia"	Peter Weller	Story by : Peter M. Lenkov; Teleplay by : Eric Guggenheim	January 19, 2018	814	9.14
183	15	"He Puko'a Kani 'Aina" "A Coral Reef Strengthens Out into Land"	Bryan Spicer	David Wolkove & Matt Wheeler	February 2, 2018	815	8.56
184	16	"O Na Hoku O Ka Lani Ka I 'Ike Ia Pae" "Only the Stars of Heaven Know Where Pae Is"	Jerry Levine	David Wolkove & Matt Wheeler	March 2, 2018	816	8.00
185	17	"Holapu Ke Ahi, Koe Iho Ka Lehu" "The Fire Blazed Up, Then Only Ashes Were Left"	Maja Vrvilo	Liz Alper & Ally Seibert	March 9, 2018	817	7.68
186	18	"E Ho'Oko Kuleana" "To Do One's Duty"	Alex O'Loughlin	David Wolkove & Matt Wheeler	March 30, 2018	818	7.80
187	19	"Aohe Mea Make I Ka Hewa; Make No I Ka Mihi Ole" "No One Has Ever Died For the Mistakes He Has Made; Only Because He Didn't Repent"	Jennifer Lynch	Rob Hanning & Ashley Dizon	April 6, 2018	819	7.97
188	20	"He Lokomaika’I Ka Manu O Kaiona" "Kind Is the Bird of Kaiona"	Bryan Spicer	Rob Hanning & Sean O'Reilly	April 13, 2018	820	7.48
189	21	"Ahuwale Ka Nane Huna" "The Answer To The Riddle Is Seen"	Eagle Egilsson	David Wolkove & Matt Wheeler	April 20, 2018	821	7.52
190	22	"Kopi Wale No I Ka I'a A 'Eu No Ka Ilo" "Though the Fish is Well Salted, the Maggots Crawl"	Ruba Nadda	Rob Hanning & Rachael Paradis	April 27, 2018	822	7.79
191	23	"Ka Hana A Ka Makua, O Ka Hana No Ia A Keiki" "What Parents Will Do, Children Will Do"	Jim Jost	Peter M. Lenkov & Matt Wheeler	May 4, 2018	823	7.04
192	24	"Ka Lala Kaukonakona Haki 'Ole I Ka Pa A Ka Makani Kona" "The Tough Branch That Does Not Break in the Kona Gale"	Krishna Rao	Story by : Alex O'Loughlin; Teleplay by : Zoe Robyn	May 11, 2018	825	7.09
193	25	"Waiho Wale Kahiko" "Ancients Exposed"	Bryan Spicer	Peter M. Lenkov & Eric Guggenheim	May 18, 2018	824	6.62

=== Season 9 (2018–19) ===
No. overall	No. in season	Title	Directed by	Written by	Original release date	Prod. code	U.S. viewers (millions)
194	1	"Ka ʻōwili ʻōkaʻi" "Cocoon"	Bryan Spicer	Leonard Freeman & Peter M. Lenkov	September 28, 2018	903	7.49
195	2	"Ke Kanaka I Haʻule Mai Ka Lewa Mai" "The Man Who Fell from the Sky"	Eagle Egilsson	David Wolkove & Matt Wheeler	October 5, 2018	902	7.39
196	3	"Mimiki Ke Kai, Ahuwale Ka Papa Leho" "When the Sea Draws Out the Tidal Wave, the Rocks Where the Cowries Hide Are Exposed"	Antonio Negret	Rob Hanning	October 12, 2018	901	7.68
197	4	"A'ohe Kio Pohaku Nalo i Ke Alo Pali" "On the Slope of the Cliff, Not One Jutting Rock Is Hidden from Sight"	Ron Underwood	Talia Gonzalez & Bisanne Masoud	October 19, 2018	905	7.48
198	5	"A'ohe Mea 'Imi A Ka Maka" "Nothing More the Eyes to Search For"	Liz Allen-Rosenbaum	Zoe Robyn & Sean O'Reilly	October 26, 2018	904	6.97
199	6	"Aia I Hi'Ikua; I Hi'Ialo" "Is Borne on the Back; Is Borne in the Arms"	Peter Weller	Rob Hanning & Paul Grellong	November 2, 2018	906	7.88
200	7	"Pua A'e La Ka Uwahi O Ka Moe" "The Smoke Seen in the Dream Now Rises"	Bryan Spicer	Story by : Peter M. Lenkov; Teleplay by : David Wolkove & Matt Wheeler	November 9, 2018	907	7.53
201	8	"Lele pū nā manu like" "Birds of a Feather..."	Carlos Bernard	Chi McBride	November 16, 2018	908	7.88
202	9	"Mai Ka Po Mai Ka 'oia'i'o" "Truth Comes from the Night"	Brad Tanenbaum	Christos Gage & Ruth Fletcher Gage	November 30, 2018	909	7.27
203	10	"Pio ke kukui, poʻele ka hale" "When the Light Goes Out, the House Is Dark"	Gabriel Beristain	Paul Grellong	December 7, 2018	911	7.81
204	11	"Hala i ke ala o'i'ole mai" "Gone on the Road from which There Is No Returning"	Carl Weathers	Matt Wheeler & David Wolkove	January 4, 2019	910	7.19
205	12	"Ka hauli o ka mea hewa 'ole, he nalowale koke" "A Bruise Inflicted on an Innocent Person Vanishes Quickly"	Roderick Davis	Zoe Robyn	January 11, 2019	912	7.96
206	13	"Ke iho mai nei ko luna" "Those Above are Descending"	Karen Gaviola	Story by : Johnny Richardson; Teleplay by : Rob Hanning & Sean O’Reilly	January 18, 2019	913	7.61
207	14	"Ikiiki i ka la o Keawalua" "Depressed with the Heat of Keawalua"	Peter Weller	Paul Grellong	February 1, 2019	914	7.87
208	15	"Ho'Opio 'Ia E Ka Noho Ali'I A Ka Ua" "Made Prisoner by the Reign of the Rain"	Karen Gaviola	Rob Hanning	February 15, 2019	915	7.30
209	16	"Hapai ke kuko, hanau ka hewa" "When Covetousness is Conceived, Sin is Born"	Jerry Levine	Talia Gonzalez & Bisanne Masoud	February 22, 2019	916	7.11
210	17	"E'ao lu'au a kualima" "Offer Young Taro Leaves To"	Alex O'Loughlin	David Wolkove & Matt Wheeler	February 22, 2019	917	6.98
211	18	"Ai no i ka 'ape he mane'o no ko ka nuku" "He who eats 'ape is bound to have his mouth itch"	Eagle Egilsson	Matt Wheeler & David Wolkove	March 8, 2019	918	7.27
212	19	"Pupuhi ka he’e o kai uli" "The Octopus of the Deep Spews its Ink"	Maja Vrvilo	Christos Gage & Ruth Fletcher Gage	March 15, 2019	919	6.51
213	20	"Ke ala o ka pu" "Way of the Gun"	David Straiton	Paul Grellong	April 5, 2019	920	6.84
214	21	"He kama na ka pueo" "Offspring of an Owl"	Jerry Levine	David Wolkove & Matt Wheeler	April 12, 2019	921	6.87
215	22	"O ke kumu, o ka mana, ho'opuka 'ia" "The Teacher, the Pupil-let it Come Forth"	Brad Turner	Rob Hanning & Ashley Dizon	April 26, 2019	922	6.62
216	23	"Ho'okahi no la o ka malihini" "A Stranger Only for a Day"	Gabriel Beristain	Zoe Robyn	May 3, 2019	923	6.77
217	24	"Hewa ka lima" "The Hand Is at Fault"	Peter Weller	Paul Grellong & Sean O'Reilly	May 10, 2019	925	6.78
218	25	"Hana Mao 'ole ka ua o Waianae" "Endlessly Pours the Rain of Waianae"	Eagle Egilsson	Matt Wheeler & David Wolkove	May 17, 2019	924	5.11

=== Season 10 (2019–20) ===
No. overall	No. in season	Title	Directed by	Written by	Original release date	Prod. code	U.S. viewers (millions)
219	1	"Ua ʻeha ka ʻili i ka maka o ka ihe" "The skin has been hurt by the point of the spear"	Duane Clark	Story by : Peter M. Lenkov; Teleplay by : David Wolkove & Matt Wheeler	September 27, 2019	1002	7.03
220	2	"Kuipeia e ka makani apaa" "Knocked flat by the wind; sudden disaster"	Karen Gaviola	Talia Gonzalez & Bisanne Masoud	October 4, 2019	1003	6.56
221	3	"E uhi ana ka wa I hala I na mea I hala" "Passing time obscures the past"	Brad Turner	Matt Wheeler & David Wolkove	October 11, 2019	1004	7.09
222	4	"Ukuli'i ka pua, onaona i ka mau'u" "Tiny is the flower, yet it scents the grasses around it"	Peter Weller	Zoe Robyn	October 18, 2019	1006	6.34
223	5	"He 'oi'o kuhihewa; he kaka ola i 'ike 'ia e ka makaula" "Don't blame ghosts and spirits for one's troubles; a human is responsible"	Yangzom Brauen	Rob Hanning & Zoe Robyn	October 25, 2019	1005	6.70
224	6	"A'ohe pau ka 'ike i ka halau ho'okahi" "All knowledge is not learned in just one school"	Karen Gaviola	Duppy Demetrius	November 1, 2019	1007	7.13
225	7	"Ka 'i'o" "DNA"	Alex O'Loughlin	Alex O'Loughlin	November 8, 2019	1001	7.13
226	8	"Ne'e aku, ne'e mai ke one o Punahoa" "That way and this way shifts the sand of Punahoa"	Carlos Bernard	Chi McBride & Matt Wheeler	November 15, 2019	1008	7.36
227	9	"Ka la'au kumu 'ole o Kahilikolo" "The trunkless tree of Kahilikolo"	Ron Underwood	Paul Grellong & Noah Evslin	November 22, 2019	1010	7.33
228	10	"O 'oe, a 'owau, nalo ia mea" "You and me; it is hidden"	Kristin Windell	Paul Grellong & Rob Hanning	December 6, 2019	1009	6.55
229	11	"Ka i ka 'ino, no ka 'ino" "To return evil for evil"	Karen Gaviola	Kendall Sherwood	December 13, 2019	1011	6.57
230	12	"Ihea 'oe i ka wa a ka ua e loku ana?" "Where were you when the rain was pouring?"	Katie Boyum	Story by : Peter M. Lenkov; Teleplay by : David Wolkove	January 3, 2020	1013	8.06
231	13	"Loa'a pono ka 'iole i ka punana" "The rat was caught right in the nest"	Antonio Negret	Kendall Sherwood & Chris Wu	January 10, 2020	1012	7.75
232	14	"I ho'olulu, ho'ohulei 'ia e ka makani" "There was a lull, and then the wind began to blow about"	Peter Weller	Story by : Peter M. Lenkov; Teleplay by : Paul Grellong	January 31, 2020	1014	7.56
233	15	"He waha kou o ka he'e" "Yours is the mouth of an octopus"	Ian Anthony Dale	Matt Wheeler & Chi McBride	February 7, 2020	1015	6.69
234	16	"He kauwa ke kanaka na ke aloha" "Man is a slave of love"	Jerry Levine	Rob Hanning	February 14, 2020	1016	6.95
235	17	"He kohu puahiohio i ka ho'olele i ka lepo i luna" "Like a whirlwind, whirling the dust upward"	Karen Gaviola	Paul Grellong & Matt Wheeler	February 21, 2020	1017	6.66
236	18	"Nalowale i ke 'ehu o he kai" "Lost in the sea sprays"	Tate Donovan	Story by : Zoe Robyn; Teleplay by : Talia Gonzalez & Bisanne Masoud	February 28, 2020	1018	6.81
237	19	"E ho'i na keiki oki uaua o na pali" "Home go the very tough lads of the hills"	Geoff Shotz	Noah Evslin & Rob Hanning	March 6, 2020	1020	6.98
238	20	"He puhe'e miki" "A gripping cuttlefish"	Andi Armaganian	Kendall Sherwood & Chris Wu	March 13, 2020	1019	7.11
239	21	"A ʻohe ia e loaʻa aku, he ulua kapapa no ka moana" "He cannot be caught for he is an ulua fish of the deep ocean"	Roderick Davis	Peter M. Lenkov & David Wolkove	March 27, 2020	1021	8.44
240	22	"Aloha" "Goodbye"	Duane Clark	Story by : Peter M. Lenkov; Teleplay by : David Wolkove & Matt Wheeler	April 3, 2020	1022	9.59

== Ratings ==
Hawaii Five-0 : U.S. viewers per episode (millions)

Season	Episode number																								
Season	1	2	3	4	5	6	7	8	9	10	11	12	13	14	15	16	17	18	19	20	21	22	23	24	25
1	14.20	12.72	12.24	10.69	10.94	10.23	10.86	10.23	10.34	12.34	10.51	10.91	11.00	10.83	19.34	11.01	10.73	10.45	10.01	9.54	11.44	9.83	9.45	10.41	–
2	12.19	11.26	11.07	10.07	11.07	10.70	10.60	10.32	11.71	10.59	11.01	11.17	11.90	10.73	9.97	9.70	10.40	9.58	9.31	10.30	10.91	9.39	11.42	–	
3	8.06	7.95	8.39	8.70	7.53	7.96	9.02	10.30	9.32	9.84	10.54	9.59	13.03	9.85	9.86	9.64	9.11	8.99	8.61	7.65	7.76	8.01	7.86	9.00	–
4	9.46	9.75	9.24	8.81	9.46	9.71	9.51	9.90	9.92	9.13	9.62	10.74	10.63	11.24	10.61	10.35	9.53	9.67	9.17	9.26	8.77	9.21	–		
5	8.97	9.77	9.19	9.18	8.92	9.47	8.95	10.07	8.77	10.51	11.50	10.59	10.50	10.08	9.81	10.66	9.79	9.54	9.38	8.87	8.70	8.35	8.60	8.57	8.27
6	8.30	9.24	8.97	9.08	8.60	8.35	8.85	8.47	9.10	8.13	9.41	9.48	10.07	8.88	8.86	8.30	7.97	8.45	8.63	8.34	8.01	8.41	8.56	8.49	8.82
7	10.22	9.73	9.65	9.19	9.51	8.50	9.48	9.84	10.09	9.40	9.46	10.10	9.69	8.42	9.81	9.86	9.62	9.12	9.20	8.74	8.77	8.49	8.06	8.01	8.22
8	8.64	8.53	8.51	8.67	8.63	9.21	9.17	8.56	9.07	8.48	7.71	9.96	9.38	9.14	8.56	8.00	7.68	7.80	7.97	7.48	7.52	7.79	7.04	7.09	6.62
9	7.49	7.39	7.68	7.48	6.97	7.88	7.53	7.88	7.27	7.81	7.19	7.96	7.61	7.87	7.30	7.11	6.98	7.27	6.51	6.84	6.87	6.62	6.77	6.78	5.11
10	7.03	6.56	7.09	6.34	6.70	7.13	7.13	7.36	7.33	6.55	6.67	8.06	7.75	7.56	6.69	6.95	6.66	6.81	6.98	7.11	8.44	9.59	–		

Audience measurement performed by Nielsen Media Research

== See also ==
- NCIS (franchise)
- List of NCIS episodes
- List of NCIS: Los Angeles episodes
- List of NCIS: New Orleans episodes
- List of NCIS: Hawaiʻi episodes
