= Pio ke kukui, poʻele ka hale =

- Hawaii Five-0 episode
- Promotional image for the episode
- Episode no.: Season 9 Episode 10
- Directed by: Gabriel Beristain
- Written by: Paul Grellong
- Cinematography by: Kurt Jones
- Editing by: John Pensky
- Production code: 911
- Original air date: December 7, 2018
- Running time: 44 minutes

Guest appearances
- Rochelle Aytes as Agent Greer; Terry O'Quinn as Joe White; Brad Beyer as Tim Cole; Joel Steingold as Mark Howard; David Agranov as Kasper Bauer; Alvin Ing as Gakuto Kojima; Alrico Dwayne Perkins Jr. as Wyatt Howard; Chloe Ryan Corniel as Joanna Howard; Ticondra Swartz as Cynthia Howard; Christian Rockford as Omar Hassan; River Christian as Young McGarrett

Episode chronology
← Previous "Mai Ka Po Mai Ka 'oia'i'o"	Next → "Hala i ke ala o'i'ole mai"
- Hawaii Five-0 (2010 TV series, season 9)

"Pio ke kukui, po'ele ka hale" (Hawaiian for: "When the Light Goes Out, the House is Dark") is the tenth episode of the ninth season of Hawaii Five-0. It aired on December 7, 2018 on CBS. The episode was written by Paul Grellong and was directed by Gabriel Beristain. In the episode a group of assassins attempt to kill Steve McGarrett, Joe White, and other members of a former military operation.

== Plot ==
Steve McGarrett returns home to see missed calls from Joe White. Before he can return the calls he his attacked and almost killed in his home by Kasper Bauer. Steve manages to fight the attacker off. Joe White informs him that someone is trying to take out all members of a former military operation and has already taken out two members. Steve believes the person who ordered the hits to be Agent Greer. Naolani gets a DNA hit from the attacker and matches it to a Russian militant. Steve visits Greer in prison to try and get information. Steve and Joe decide to hide out in a safe house on a ranch in Montana. Lou finds Bauer in a gas station bathroom and arrests him. Steve and Joe arrive at the safe house and the two find Tim Cole, the third surviving member. Steve, Joe, and Tim begin prepping for an impending attack. Adam visits Gakuto Kojima in prison in an attempt to find out how Greer is communicating with the outside. Steve, Joe, and Tim and begin taking gunfire and engage with the attackers. Cole is hit during the gunfight and dies, Joe also gets shot in the process. Lou begins interrogating Bauer and gets the name "Thompson" the guy who set everything up. Lou reveals the name of the person who ordered the hits to be Omar Hassan, Steve and Joe recognize the name to be a then 10-year-old boy they ran into during the mission. Steve and Joe take a pair of horses and begin riding to a nearby-clinic after Junior informs them that a med-vac is on the way. On the way Joe stops and tells Steve that there is no clinic and that he called off the med-vac. After having a conversation with Steve, Joe dies.

== Production ==
The episode serves as the season's mid-season finale.

=== Casting ===
On November 15, 2018 it was announced that Terry O'Quinn would return as Joe White marking his first appearance in the series since the fifth season. Rochelle Aytes returned as Agent Greer for the third time in the season after being cast in a recurring role earlier in the year. Meanwhile, Brad Beyer was cast as a guest star in the role of Tim Cole. Scott Caan, Taylor Wily, and Dennis Chun were all absent from the episode despite being credited in the opening title sequence.

=== Promotion ===
The press release for the episode occurred on November 15, 2018. The teaser trailer for the episode aired immediately following the previous episode on November 30, 2018. Three additional promos were later released on December 7.

== Reception ==
=== Viewing figures ===
Viewing figures increased from the previous episode. The episode aired on December 7, 2019 and was watched live and same day by 7.81 million viewers. Within seven days, by means of DVR and video on demand services the total number of viewers rose to 10.43 million. It ranked as the sixteenth most viewed episode for the week of December 3–9.

=== Critical response ===
Reviews toward the episode were mostly positive. TV Fanatic gave the episode an editorial rating of 4.25 out of 5; and a user rating of 3.1 out of 5 based on sixty-two reviews. On IMDb the episode is rated 8.7 out of 10 based on 117 reviews.

== Broadcast and streaming ==
The episode is available to watch on demand through the CBS website with a CBS All Access subscription. It is also available for individual purchase on Amazon, iTunes, and Vudu.

== See also ==
- List of Hawaii Five-0 (2010 TV series) episodes
- Hawaii Five-0 (2010 TV series) season 9
