= Pua A'e La Ka Uwahi O Ka Moe =

- Hawaii Five-0 episode
- Promotional image for the episode
- Episode no.: Season 9 Episode 7
- Directed by: Bryan Spicer
- Story by: Peter M. Lenkov
- Teleplay by: David Wolkove & Matt Wheeler
- Cinematography by: Kurt Jones
- Editing by: John Keris
- Production code: 907
- Original air date: November 9, 2018
- Running time: 44 minutes

Guest appearances
- Richard Herd as Milton Cooper; Chris Mulkey as William Pettifer; Mariano Farrar as Clarence Whitmour

Episode chronology
| ← Previous "Aia I Hi'Ikua; I Hi'Ialo" | Next → "Lele pū nā manu like" |
- Hawaii Five-0 (2010 TV series, season 9)

"Pua A'e La Ka Uwahi O Ka Moe" (Hawaiian for: "The Smoke Seen in the Dream Now Rises") is the seventh episode of the ninth season of Hawaii Five-0. It is also the two-hundredth episode of the series overall and aired on November 9, 2018 on CBS. The story was written by series co-developer Peter M. Lenkov while the teleplay was written by David Wolkove and Matt Wheeler. The episode was directed by Bryan Spicer. In the episode Steve dreams that he is his grandfather solving a case in the year 1941, on the days leading to the Japanese attack on Pearl Harbor.

== Plot ==
At the soft opening of Steve and Danny's restaurant, Sergeant Duke Lukela introduces Steve to Milton Cooper. Milton informs Steve that he was friends with his grandfather. Steve receives an old belonging of his grandfathers in which he finds a cold case former Honolulu Police Department Detective Chang Apana was working about Lila Kekoa, a girl who disappeared on April 17, 1932. He decides to try and attempt to solve the case. While going through the notes for the case Steve falls asleep and dreams that he is his grandfather investigating the case in 1941.

Steve and Milton exit the station and come under instant gun fire. Officer Mike Flanagan informs them of possible suspects. The two visit Evan Kekoa, Lila's brother to question him. They later find suspects in Chinatown, Honolulu and engage in a car chase with them which ends when the suspects have a car accident and their car catches fire killing both suspects. While Steve is getting treated by the doctor.

Steve and Milton look towards Earl Blackstone for answers who points them to Alexa Alana, a singer and her manager “Biggie” Tupa. The two find and begin questioning Alexa who is shot during questioning. Before she dies she gives them the name "James". Captain Charles Sumner takes them off the case until further notice. However, the two continue to investigate. A gun leads Steve, Milton, and Mike to Clarence Whitmour. They infiltrate Clarence's house where they engage in a gun fight with his guards. They later find and begin to question him, during questioning an alarm goes off, the three walk outside and see the first planes flying towards Pearl Harbor.

Steve wakes up and tells Danny that he thinks he solved the case. The two begin putting the pieces together and find a house where a plans were made to build a pool. Satellite imaging confirms that no pool was ever built. An HPD crime scene unit excavates the back yard and finds an old car buried with Lila's remains.

While at their restaurant Steve tell Danny that he no longer wishes to be a part of the restaurant causing Danny to inform him that Kamekona has offered to buy their shares of the business. The two agree to sell.

=== Continuity ===
The restaurant that Steve and Milton find their suspects at is the Wo Fat Restaurant. The restaurant is the namesake for recurring character and villain Wo Fat.

== Production ==
=== Casting ===
Richard Herd was cast in the episode to play Milton Cooper, a retired Honolulu Police Department detective. Meanwhile, Chris Mulkey was cast to portray a villain named William Pettifer. In addition to their regular characters, the main cast also portrayed characters as if the year was 1941.

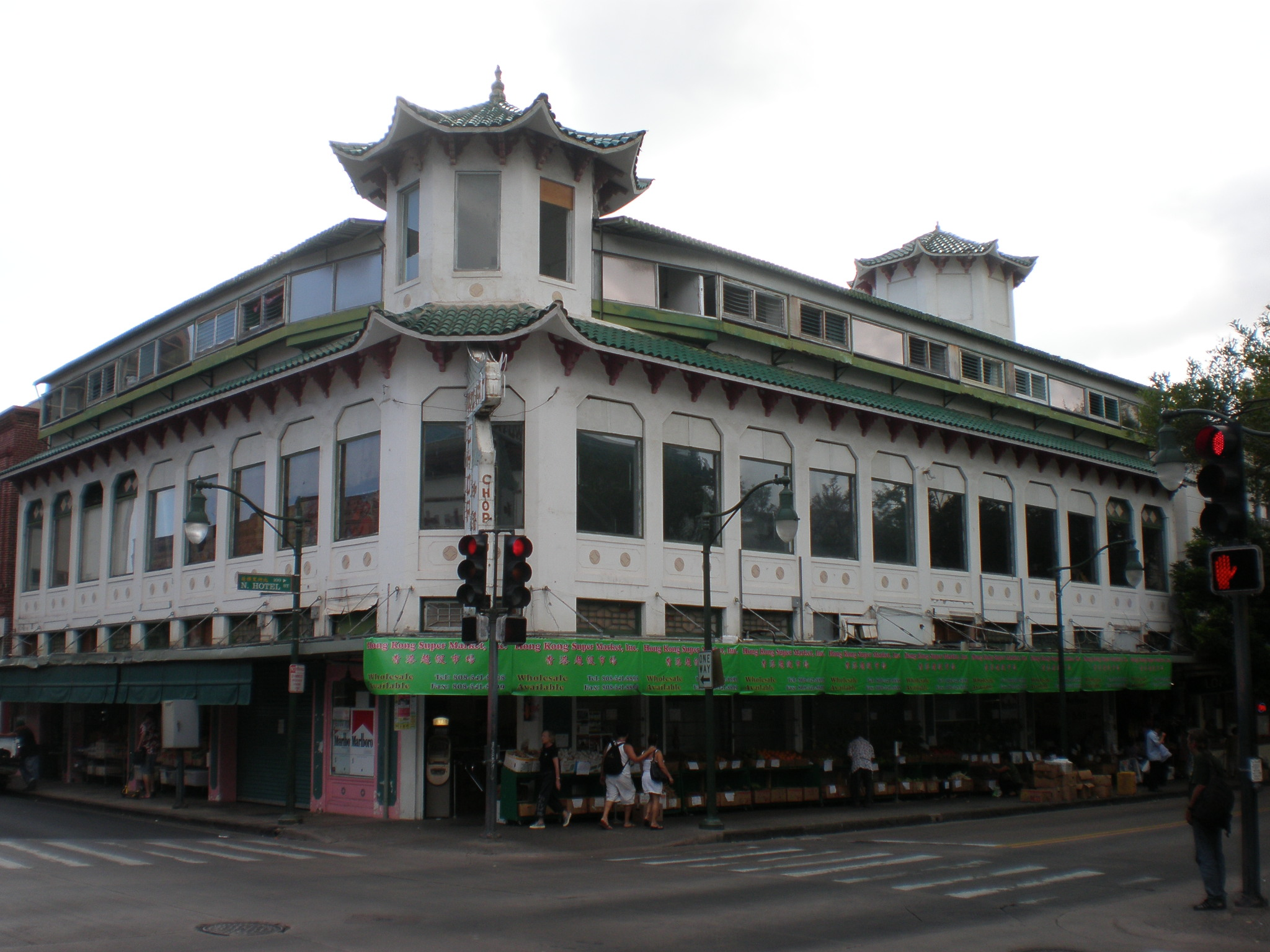
The Wo Fat Building in the Chinatown, Honolulu served as a filming location for the episode.

=== Filming ===
The episode was filmed in September 2018. Filming for the beginning of a car chase in the episode took place outside the Wo Fat building.

=== Post-production ===
This episode featured a slightly edited version of the Hawaii Five-0 theme song for the first time in the series history. Brian Tyler composed the incidental music.

=== Promotion ===
The teaser trailer was released immediately following the previous episode on November 2, 2018. Five additional promos were later released on November 9. In honor of the two-hundredth episode CBS also released a montage featuring scenes from previous episodes.

== Reception ==
=== Viewing figures ===
The episode aired on November 9, 2018 and was watched live and same day by 7.5 million viewers. It ranked as the sixteenth most viewed episode for the week of November 5–11.

=== Cast and crew interviews ===
In interviews with the cast and crew prior to the episode series star Alex O'Loughlin stated that "It’s definitely a departure episode"; meanwhile, executive producer Peter M. Lenkov compared the episode to The Wizard of Oz.

=== Critical response ===
Reviews toward the episode were mostly positive. TV Fanatic gave the episode an editorial rating of 4.5 out of 5; and a user rating of 4.0 out of 5 based on twenty-five reviews. On IMDb the episode is rated 7.5 out of 10 based on 29 reviews.

== Broadcast and streaming ==
The episode is available to watch on demand through the CBS website with a CBS All Access subscription. It is also available for individual purchase on Amazon, iTunes, and Vudu.

== See also ==
- List of Hawaii Five-0 (2010 TV series) episodes
- Hawaii Five-0 (2010 TV series) season 9
