= Lele pū nā manu like =

- Hawaii Five-0 episode
- Promotional images for the episode
- Episode no.: Season 9 Episode 8
- Directed by: Carlos Bernard
- Written by: Chi McBride
- Cinematography by: Newton Termeer
- Editing by: John Pensky
- Production code: 908
- Original air date: November 16, 2018
- Running time: 44 minutes

Guest appearances
- Kekoa Kekumano as Nahele; Shawn Mokuahi Garnett as Flippa; Michelle Hurd as Renee Grover; Chosen Jacobs as Will Grover; Al Harrington as Mamo Kahike; Shawn Thomsen as Pua Kai; Kunal Sharma as Koa; Clifton Powell as Percy Lee Grover Jr.; Louis Gossett Jr. as Percy Grover Sr.; Gladys Knight as Ella Grover; Eli K.M. Foster as John Henman; John Lavelle as Patrick Hale; Adele Chu as Mrs. Lee

Episode chronology
← Previous "Pua A'e La Ka Uwahi O Ka Moe"	Next → "Mai Ka Po Mai Ka 'oia'i'o"
- Hawaii Five-0 (2010 TV series, season 9)

"Lele pū nā manu like" (Hawaiian for: "Birds of a Feather...") is the eighth episode of the ninth season of Hawaii Five-0. It aired on November 16, 2018 on CBS. The episode was written by series star Chi McBride and was directed by Carlos Bernard. In the episode the Five-0 task Force attempts to solve the case of a house robbery while Lou has to deal with family visiting for Thanksgiving.

== Plot ==
While playing their annual flag football game the Five-0 Task Force is called into a case about a robbery gone wrong. Upon arriving, the team deduces that while a pair of thief's were stealing from a house one of them fell down a flight of stairs and that their partner finished the job and left them. Lou has trouble dealing with his brother, mother, and father while they are visiting for Thanksgiving. Tani informs Steve that a separate entry point was found in the house meaning the two thief's were not working together.

Ella, Lou's mother suggests that Lou and his brother Percy cook Thanksgiving dinner together. The two make a bet on each finding the best turkey and letting the family pick. Percy has trouble finding a turkey and gets Kamekona to find him a live one. Jerry contacts the owner of the house and finds that the only thing missing was a baseball card. Adam and Jerry visit a local baseball memorabilia store to try and find the card. The owner of the store runs but Adam catches him before he can get away.

Upon searching the store the two find the card and get a description of the thief from the store owner. While arguing with his brother a fire starts in Lou's kitchen. Tani and Junior return the baseball card to its rightful owner who identifies the suspect as Patrick Hale. They find Patrick who informs them that he stole the card so that he could buy Thanksgiving dinner for his homeless shelter. The Honolulu Fire Department is able to keep the fire contained to the kitchen with minimal damage. The team meets for a Thanksgiving meal at what is now Kamekona's restaurant where Lou gets his brother a job.

== Production ==
The episode served as the season's Thanksgiving themed episode.

=== Casting ===
On August 24, 2018 it was announced that Louis Gossett Jr. had been cast to play Percy Grover Sr., the father of McBride's character, Lou Grover. It was later revealed that Gladys Knight was set to play Ella Grover while Clifton Powell was cast to play Percy Lee Grover Jr., Lou's mother and brother respectively. Scott Caan was absent from the episode despite being credited in the opening title sequence and mentioned throughout the episode.

=== Promotion ===
The press release for the episode occurred on October 30, 2018. The teaser trailer aired immediately following the previous episode on November 2, 2018. Two additional promos were later released on November 15.

== Reception ==
=== Viewing figures ===
The episode aired on November 16, 2018 and was watched live and same day by 7.88 million viewers.

=== Critical reception ===
Reviews toward the episode were mostly positive. TV Fanatic gave the episode an editorial rating of 4.5 out of 5; and has a user rating of 3.7 out of 5 based on twenty-four reviews. On IMDb the episode is rated 6.5 out of 10 based on seventy-three reviews.

== Broadcast and streaming ==
The episode is available to watch on demand through the CBS website with a CBS All Access subscription. It is also available for individual purchase on Amazon, iTunes, and Vudu.

== See also ==
- List of Hawaii Five-0 (2010 TV series) episodes
- Hawaii Five-0 (2010 TV series) season 9
