= Ke Kanaka I Haʻule Mai Ka Lewa Mai =

- Hawaii Five-0 episode
- Steve McGarrett is transporting the rogue CIA Agent Greer after she is arrested by the Five-0 Task Force
- Episode no.: Season 9 Episode 2
- Directed by: Eagle Egilsson
- Written by: David Wolkove & Matt Wheeler
- Cinematography by: Newton Termeer
- Editing by: John Pensky
- Production code: 902
- Original air date: October 5, 2018
- Running time: 42 minutes

Guest appearances
- Rochelle Aytes as Agent Greer; Jack Coleman as Agent Miller; Eric Steinberg as Captain Keo; David Preston as Jack Teague; Susan King as Holly Teague; Kennedy King as Spencer Teague; Jiahndria Lozano-Day as Cadet Olina

Episode chronology
← Previous "Ka ʻōwili ʻōka’i"	Next → "Mimiki Ke Kai, Ahuwale Ka Papa Leho"
- Hawaii Five-0 (2010 TV series, season 9)

"Ke Kanaka I Ha'ule Mai Ka Lewa Mai" (Hawaiian for: "The Man Who Fell From the Sky") is the second episode of the ninth season of Hawaii Five-0. The episode aired on October 5, 2018 on CBS. It was written by David Wolkove and Matt Wheeler and was directed by Eagle Egilsson. In the episode the Five-0 task force attempts to hunt down a man after he is kidnapped by Chinese spies.

== Plot ==
Picking up in after the events from the last episode, aboard a Hawaiian Airlines flight above Honolulu a dad is sedated and forced to jump out of a plane along with his kidnapper. Back at Steve's house, Danny and Junior are having to collect Kamekona's investment money after Eddie, McGarrett's dog, digs it up. The Five-0 Task Force is called in to investigate a reported explosion aboard the flight. The FAA is able to use the plane's black box to determine exactly where the jump took place. The victim is revealed to be Jack Teauge.

Tani visits Captain Keo, her old HPD instructor, to ask him to run ballistics on the gun she found in Adam's house. Keo however, turns her down because he doesn't like doing things off the books. Jerry and Junior are able to narrow the possible landing zone to eight square miles. With the landing spot being dense jungle, using satellite imaging, Jerry filters out the color green and is able to find the parachute. Danny, Tani, and Junior begin pursuing the kidnapper and Teauge and find the kidnappers body.

When Lou searches through security footage from Honolulu International Airport he finds that Agent Miller, Greer's partner was waiting at Teauge's departure gate. After looking through his computer, Jerry finds that Teauge is actually a Chinese spy. Steve and Lou visit Miller to ask him why he was waiting for Teague who informs them that Teague is really a double agent working for the CIA. Danny, Tani, and Junior find a CIA Special-ops team that was hunting Teague murdered in the jungle and find out there is also a Chinese spy team looking for Teague.

The three then engage in a shootout with the Chinese. They also find and arrest Greer who was working with them. Danny continues pursuing Teague who gets away from him. Miller is able to pick up Teague. However, the Chinese who had tapped his phone shoot and kill Miller and re-capture Teague. The Five-0 team track the Chinese spy team managing to arrest the remaining member and rescue Teague.

Keo visits Tani at her house and tells her that he'll run the ballistics. Steve hands Greer off to the CIA or transports her off the island.

=== Continuity ===
The episode concludes a loose story arc that began in the previous episode, Ka ʻōwili ʻōkaʻi.

== Production ==
=== Casting ===
Despite being credited in the opening title sequence, Ian Anthony Dale, Taylor Wily, Dennis Chun, and Kimee Balmilero were absent from the episode. Rochelle Aytes and Jack Coleman returned to make their second appearances in the series, as CIA Agents Greer and Miller respectively, after they were both introduced in the previous episode. Meanwhile, David Preston was cast in the episode to play a CIA/Chinese double agent.

=== Promotion ===
The first press release for the episode occurred on September 27, 2018 The first teaser for the episode aired immediately following the previous episode on September 28 while three additional promos were released on October 4, 2018.

== Reception ==
=== Viewing figures ===
The episode aired on October 5, 2018 and was watched live and same day by 7.39 million viewers. Within seven days, by means of DVR and video on demand services the total number of viewers rose to 10.10 million. It ranked as the twenty-fifth most viewed show for the broadcast week of October 1–7.

=== Critical reception ===
Reviews toward the episode were mostly positive. TV Fanatic gave the episode an editorial rating of 4.0 out of 5; and a user rating of 4.3 out of 5 based on twenty reviews. On IMDb the episode 8.2 out of 10 based on 76 reviews.

== Broadcast and streaming ==
The episode is available to watch on demand through the CBS website with a CBS All Access subscription. It is also available for individual purchase on Amazon, iTunes, and Vudu.

== See also ==
- List of Hawaii Five-0 (2010 TV series) episodes
- Hawaii Five-0 (2010 TV series) season 9
