= Ina Paha =

- Hawaii Five-0 episode
- In the alternate universe Danny introduces Steve to Chin Ho for the first time who is having a meeting with Steve's father John
- Episode no.: Season 5 Episode 7
- Directed by: Larry Teng
- Written by: Peter M. Lenkov
- Cinematography by: Michael Martinez
- Editing by: Roderick Davis
- Production code: 507
- Original air date: November 7, 2014
- Running time: 44 minutes

Guest appearances
- Mark Dacascos as Wo Fat; James Marsters as Victor Hesse; Will Yun Lee as Sang Min; Taylor Wily as Kamekona Tupola; Ian Anthony Dale as Adam Nishomouri; Larisa Oleynik as Jenna Kaye; Gavin Rossdale as Johnny Moreau; Tracy Ifeachor as Eris; William Sadler as John McGarrett; Dennis Chun as Duke Lukela; Teilor Grubbs as Grace Williams; Nicolai Makana Perez as Young Steve McGarrett

Episode chronology
← Previous "Hoʻomaʻike"	Next → "Ka Hana Malu"
- Hawaii Five-0 (2010 TV series, season 5)

"Ina Paha" (Hawaiian for: "If Perhaps") is the seventh episode of the fifth season of Hawaii Five-0. It is also the one hundredth episode of the series overall and aired on November 7, 2014 on CBS. The episode was written by Peter M. Lenkov and was directed by Larry Teng. In the episode Steve is kidnapped and drugged by Wo Fat and McGarrett imagines what would've happened had the team never gotten together. The episode featured all current main cast members at the time, as well as current and past recurring cast members from the series.

== Plot ==
=== Show universe ===
McGarrett wakes up in an empty white room with a locked door and, immediately, begins calling for help with no success. Following a sting operation using Sang Min as a confidential informant to lock up a human trafficker, Danny receives a call. The Five-0 team responds and find McGarrett's car empty, with blood inside and tire tracks leading away from the vehicle, then realizing that McGarrett has been kidnapped. A screen then turns on in the room McGarrett is trapped in, and a home video from his childhood plays. Following this, the room is filed with gas and an unknown person in a gas mask begins entering the room as McGarrett passes out, and causing him to dream an alternate universe, where Five-0 never existed and John McGarrett is still alive. McGarrett wakes up once again, this time locked to a chair, before being drugged and passing out again. While the team searches for McGarrett, they look towards Sang Min and Adam Noshimori for help; meanwhile, Steve is being tortured by Wo Fat, who is looking for his father. McGarrett then learns that Doris secretly took in and raised a young Wo Fat for years after his mother's death, until her superiors found out and she was forced to let him go, and Wo Fat considers Steve a brother because of this. After engaging in a fight and killing Eris (Wo Fat's accomplice), Steve sets up Wo Fat in an attempt to escape. Just as the team finds out where Wo Fat is hiding Steve, Steve and Wo Fat engage in a fight, which ultimately ends with the two holding each other at gunpoint. They both fire their weapons and Steve is grazed by a bullet on the forehead, left with minor injuries from the wound; however, Wo Fat takes the shot in the head, promptly killing him. The team breaches the room and finds McGarrett injured on the ground. When they reach him, Steve, having been stuck in the alternate reality for so long, asks for his father and Danny has to remind him that his father died. The team then gazes at the deceased Wo Fat one last time, before leaving for home. The final scene in the episode features many flashbacks from the series along with a special song titled All for One written by Five for Fighting.

=== Alternate universe ===
Just like the series premiere, the episode begins in Pohang, South Korea, where Navy SEAL lieutenant commander Steve McGarrett is transporting prisoner Anton Hesse (Norman Reedus). Anton's brother, Victor (James Marsters) calls McGarrett to announce he is holding his father, John McGarrett (William Sadler), in Honolulu, and wants to make an exchange. However, Victor is in fact tracking McGarrett's convoy; two helicopters arrive and ambush it. In the midst of the skirmish, McGarrett is forced to kill Anton when he brandishes a weapon. In response, Victor attempts to execute John, only to be foiled when Detective Danny Williams with the Honolulu Police Department breaches the house and arrests Victor before John can be murdered. At the Honolulu Police Department headquarters, Lou, now a tourist, is talking with Duke Lukela to report stolen golf clubs. McGarrett then meets with his father, Danny (who is still happily married to Rachel and embraced the move to Hawaii), and Captain Chin Ho Kelly (who has never investigated by Internal Affairs) to discuss the case. On the way to the hospital, McGarrett and Danny witness Jerry Ortega as a mentally ill homeless man. Once at the hospital, the two run in to Jenna Kaye, who is looking for her fiancée who was in a motorcycle accident. Also, on the television is an advertisement featuring Kono Kalakaua, who is a professional surfer, and Max is a doctor who works at the hospital. McGarrett and Danny interrogate Victor to find out who leaked the info about McGarret's secret military operation and they receive the name Wo Fat. The two then interrogate Kamekona Tupola, who is a convict that never went legit, in an attempt to find Wo Fat. They find him and engage in a gun battle with him, in which Wo Fat loses and gets shot and killed. After returning to the HPD, Danny offers Steve a job as his partner, which he ultimately turns down. The final scene in the alternate universe involves Steve spending time with his father.

== Production ==
The episode was filmed in September 2014. The show began with a cold open which was archive footage from the pilot episode that had been redacted, however it had a different ending which led into the episode. Unlike a normal episode this episode featured scenes from an alternative universe on what would've happened had the team not joined together. Two of the most notable appearances were the return of two past recurring characters as guest stars, James Marsters as Victor Hesse and Larisa Oleynik as Jenna Kaye. The final scene in the episode featured a song titled All for One written by Five for Fighting. The song was played along with archive scenes from the past 100 episodes of the show it also featured archive footage from past main characters which include Michelle Borth as Catherine Rollins who left following season 4, Lauren German as Lori Weston as well as past recurring characters which include Christine Lahti as Doris McGarrett, Reiko Aylesworth as Malia Waincroft, and Richard T. Jones as Governor Sam Denning.

== Reception ==
The episode aired on November 7, 2014 and was watched live and same day by a total of 8.95 million viewers and within seven days the episode was watched by a total of 11.9 million viewers. Reviews toward the episode were mostly positive. Spoiler TV called this episode "the best of the season" and also stated that it was "a spectacular end to the Wo Fat story". While TV Fanatic stated that "It was compelling and it made sense why Steve would be imagining a different reality, one in which his father was still alive."

== Broadcast, streaming, and home video releases ==
The episode was released on DVD and Blu-ray along with the other season 5 episodes in a 6-disc box set and deleted scenes and commentary. It was released in region one on September 1, 2015 and in region two on September 14, 2015. The episode can be individually purchased on Amazon and Vudu or viewed on demand with a CBS All Access subscription but as of February 24, 2019, Hawaii Five-0 is not available on Netflix.

== See also ==
- List of Hawaii Five-0 (2010 TV series) episodes
- Hawaii Five-0 (2010 TV series) season 5
