= Hawaii Five-0 (2010 TV series) season 5 =

Hawaii Five-0
- Season 5
- Season 5 U.S. DVD cover
- Showrunner: Peter M. Lenkov
- Starring: Alex O'Loughlin; Scott Caan; Daniel Dae Kim; Grace Park; Masi Oka; Chi McBride; Jorge Garcia
- No. of episodes: 25

Release
- Original network: CBS
- Original release: September 26, 2014 – May 8, 2015

Season chronology
- ← Previous; Season 4 Next → Season 6

The fifth season of the CBS crime drama series Hawaii Five-0 premiered on Friday, September 26, 2014, and concluded on May 8, 2015, with a two-hour season finale. The season consisted of 25 episodes.

For the 2014–15 U.S. television season, the fifth season of Hawaii Five-0 ranked 20 with an average of 12.28 million viewers.

== Cast and characters ==
On March 13, 2014, it was announced that Jorge Garcia was promoted to a series regular beginning with the fifth season.

=== Main cast ===
- Alex O'Loughlin as Lieutenant Commander Steven "Steve" McGarrett, United States Navy Reserve
- Scott Caan as Detective Daniel "Danny" "Danno" Williams
- Daniel Dae Kim as Detective Lieutenant Chin Ho Kelly
- Grace Park as Officer Kono Kalakaua
- Masi Oka as Dr. Max Bergman, Chief Medical Examiner
- Chi McBride as Captain Lou Grover
- Jorge Garcia as Jerry Ortega

=== Recurring ===
- Taylor Wily as Kamekona Tupuola
- Dennis Chun as HPD Sergeant Duke Lukela
- Mark Dacascos as Wo Fat
- Ian Anthony Dale as Adam Noshimuri
- Teilor Grubbs as Grace Williams
- Terry O'Quinn as Commander Joe White, United States Navy (retired)
- Brian Yang as Che "Charlie" Fong
- Taryn Manning as Mary Ann McGarrett
- Richard T. Jones as Governor Sam Denning
- Shawn Mokuahi-Garnett as Shawn "Flippa" Tupuola
- Shawn Thomsen as HPD Officer Pua Kai
- Amanda Setton as Dr. Mindy Shaw
- Mirrah Foulkes as ADA Ellie Clayton
- Paige Hurd as Samantha Grover
- Lili Simmons as Amber Vitale / Melissa Armstrong

=== Guest stars ===
- Greg Grunberg as Agent Morrison
- Maa Tanuvasa as Sheriff Marcus Kalawaia
- Alvin Joiner as Jason "JC" Dekker
- Melina Kanakaredes as Kathy Millwood
- Anna Belknap as Amy Lange
- A. J. Buckley as Julius Brennan
- Nick Jonas as Ian Wright
- Michael Imperioli as Odell Martin
- Jon Lovitz as Barry Burns
- Duane "Dog" Chapman as himself ("Dog the Bounty Hunter")
- Mykelti Williamson as Clay Maxwell
- Kim Wayans as Diane Maxwell
- Pauly Shore as Jake Lockhard
- Jaleel White as Nolan Fremont
- Kevin Farley as Mickey Dickson
- Robert Flores as USCG LT Young
- Willie Garson as Gerard Hirsch
- Claire van der Boom as Rachel Edwards
- Kekoa Kekumano as Nahele Huikala
- Natasha Henstridge as Caroline Porter
- Michelle Borth as Catherine Rollins
- Carol Burnett as McGarrett's Aunt Deb
- Frankie Valli as Leonard Cassano
- Larisa Oleynik as Jenna Kaye
- Allie Gonino as Lea Nohoa
- Sonya Balmores as Alana Duncan
- Sumire as Keilani Makua

== Episodes ==
No. overall	No. in season	Title	Directed by	Written by	Original release date	Prod. code	U.S. viewers (millions)
94	1	"Aʻohe Kahi e Peʻe Ai" "Nowhere to Hide"	Bryan Spicer	Peter M. Lenkov & Ken Solarz	September 26, 2014	503	8.97
Five-0 investigate the deaths of two tourists who were hiking in the mountains, and find that the culprit is an unmanned aerial vehicle fitted with automatic weapons. The drone was stolen from a military contractor. After the drone attacks a beach crowd, the streets of Honolulu are evacuated in anticipation of further attacks. Jerry Ortega (Jorge Garcia) has a plan to hack into the drone and disable it. In the meantime, Danny Williams (Scott Caan) and Steve McGarrett (Alex O'Loughlin) attend a mandatory psychological evaluation. Adam Noshimuri (Ian Anthony Dale) proposes to Kono (Grace Park). Jerry suspects a vintage bookshop owner of counterfeiting money, and the owner tells a partner that they have to deal with Jerry. Danny learns from Marco Reyes (Anthony Ruivivar) that his brother Matt has been captured, and Danny has to pay back the money Matt had stolen from his captors. Note: This is the first episode to feature Jorge Garcia as a main cast member
95	2	"Ka Makuakane" "Family Man"	Sylvain White	Steven Lilien & Bryan Wynbrandt	October 3, 2014	502	9.77
When Sophie Larkin is kidnapped during her school recital, Five-0 initially suspect that it involves her Navy SEAL father who is on a secret mission in Afghanistan. After the Navy assures the team that there are no security breaches, they realize the kidnapper took the wrong girl when Eric Porter (William Mapother), a father of another girl from the school receives a call demanding $1.6 million. Meanwhile, Marco Reyes reveals to Danny that Matt stole $18.5 million from him. Reyes wants Danny to bring back the money believing he has it.
96	3	"Kanalu Hope Loa" "The Last Break"	Joe Dante	Sarah Byrd	October 10, 2014	501	9.19
Three young surfer women (Allie Gonino, Sonya Balmores and Sumire) rob a tour bus, and end up killing a tourist, businessman Nathan Wagner. Evidence suggests that Wagner was targeted, and Kono goes undercover as a surfer. It later surfaces that a conwoman who was after Wagner's wealth is after the surfer thieves as well. Meanwhile, Jerry is investigating antique book seller Thomas Farrow (Greg Ellis), suspecting him of running a counterfeiting ring. Although Farrow was cleared by the authorities, Jerry enlists the help of Kamekona (Taylor Wily). Also, Danny finds the money Marco Reyes was after in a remote area.
97	4	"Ka Noeʻau" "The Painter"	Peter Weller	Peter M. Lenkov & Ken Solarz	October 17, 2014	504	9.18
Joseph Stegner, hitman working for the Bagosa crime family arrives in Hawaii from Detroit. Five-0 quickly apprehend Stegner, but he is killed by a sniper. The team learn that the suspect is Nick Mercer (Timothy V. Murphy), another hitman under Bagosa's employ. Mercer claims that after he had his heart replaced, he had a change of perspective and decided to run his own Witness Protection Program, by helping Bagosa targets into hiding in a camp in Molokaʻi rather than kill them. Mob boss Albert Bagosa (Carmen Argenziano) has ultimately learned of Mercer's betrayal and is flying to the island with five more hitmen to finish the job. Meanwhile, Danny finds out he is $5.5 million short. At the risk of his career, Chin Ho Kelly (Daniel Dae Kim) gets the rest of the money from his father's killer and former brother-in-law Gabriel Waincroft (Christopher Sean). Danny and McGarrett deliver the money to Reyes only to discover that Matt was dead the entire time. In response, a grief-stricken Danny kills the henchmen before killing Reyes.
98	5	"Hoʻoilina" "Legacy"	Bryan Spicer	Eric Guggenheim	October 24, 2014	505	8.92
McGarrett visits his father's grave on the anniversary of his death, and encounters Ellie Clayton (Mirrah Foulkes), a state prosecutor who also visited his grave. McGarrett learns that Ellie was the daughter of Paul Clayton, who was killed 20 years ago in a supposed robbery gone wrong. John investigated the case which is still unsolved, and the two became close until John's death. McGarrett decides to reopen the case. Jerry continues to investigate Thomas Farrow despite multiple warnings from both McGarrett and Chin. Note:Danny is absent in this episode as he has brought his brother's body home from Colombia.
99	6	"Hoʻomaʻike" "Unmasked"	Joe Dante	Story by : David Wolkove; Teleplay by : Steven Lilien & Bryan Wynbrandt	October 31, 2014	506	9.47
Danny returns from his brother's funeral and it is revealed that Matt was dead before Marco arrived on Oahu in Aʻohe Kahi e Peʻe Ai. Chin, Grover, and Kono, investigate a murder victim who was found in a freezer on Halloween night. When a second body is found in a similar fashion, Max (Masi Oka) discovers that the killer is copying the events of Jack Knife, a 1984 horror film in which the killer was killing the students who bullied him. Meanwhile, Farrow interrogates Jerry, and then lets him go. Danny and McGarrett start believing Jerry's claim, but Farrow uses steps to avoid arrest by cleaning Jerry's basement and his home. Jerry discovers that Farrow is an alias of a British Special Forces operative, named William Corrigan, who was dishonorably discharged for attacking a suspected rebel village against orders. Farrow was counterfeiting money to aid the I.R.A.
100	7	"Ina Paha" "If Perhaps"	Larry Teng	Peter M. Lenkov	November 7, 2014	507	8.95
When McGarrett goes missing, the rest of Five-0 begins searching for him. With the help of Sang Min (Will Yun Lee), the team learns that Wo Fat (Mark Dacascos) kidnapped him. Wo Fat tortures McGarrett for the whereabouts of his father. Wo Fat drugs Steve, causing the latter to believe he's back in September 2010 where Victor Hesse (James Marsters) is arrested before he can kill Steve's father, John (William Sadler). The team also lead different lives where, as a result of Five-0 never existing, Kono is a world champion surfer, Chin was never investigated by Internal Affairs, Max is an ER doctor, Kamekona never goes legit and ends up in prison, Grover is a tourist, Jerry is a mentally ill vagrant, Danny is still happily married to Rachel and embraced the move to Hawaii, and Jenna Kaye is looking for her boyfriend who was in a motorcycle accident. Back in reality, McGarrett learns that Doris took in and raised Wo Fat for years after his mother's death until she was forced to let him go and Wo Fat considers Steve a brother. McGarrett breaks free and a final showdown with Wo Fat erupts between the two, ending with McGarrett shooting him in the head, killing him.
101	8	"Ka Hana Malu" "Inside Job"	Jerry Levine	Moira Kirland	November 21, 2014	508	10.07
Five-0 investigates the murder of David and Kate Kealoha. David was an investor who was about to be arrested for embezzling from his clients. The team suspect both his sons Jake (Nathan Kress) and Travis (Charlie Carver) to be behind the murder when their pet dog reacts violently to their presence. Travis flees, where Chin and Kono follow him to a motel. It is revealed that both sons were not involved, and Travis was covering up a relationship with his best friend's mother Patti Gabel (Josie Davis). Meanwhile, McGarrett's aunt Deb (Carol Burnett) returns to Hawaii to marry her fiancé, Leonard Cassano (Frankie Valli), who is terminally ill with cancer. Jerry discovers that Leonard was a lawyer who represented a New York City mafia family and was suspected to have destroyed evidence that would convict his client. Leonard later confronts McGarrett to explain to him that he never destroyed the evidence, but secretly kept it. He hands it to McGarrett, who decides to wait "a couple of months" before handing it to the New York District Attorney's office.
102	9	"Ke Koho Mamao Aku" "Longshot"	Bryan Spicer	Sue Palmer	December 12, 2014	509	8.77
Rodeo bull rider Keone Maka is found poisoned in a desert on the Big Island, which NASA uses to test Mars rovers. Max reluctantly joins forces with Dr. Sanjeet Dhawan (Ravi Patel), the Hawaii Island Medical Examiner, with whom he has been feuding for several years. Meanwhile, Officer Pua attempts to bring Steve and Danny to justice for cutting down a Christmas tree on a protected forest reserve. Pua eventually catches Danny with the Christmas tree and fines him $1200, but decides not to take away the tree until after Christmas.
103	10	"Wawahi moeʻuhane" "Broken Dreams"	Sylvain White	Story by : Peter M. Lenkov; Teleplay by : Steven Lilien & Bryan Wynbrandt	January 2, 2015	510	10.51
Five-0 investigate the murder of Brooke Waiakea, a hula dancer, later discovering that the dance studio is a front for an escort agency. The victim reminds Dr. Shaw (Amanda Setton), Max's intern, of a past case. The team turn to the aid of Harry Brown (William Forsythe), a former HPD detective-turned-private investigator, who was helping Brooke take down the escort agency.
104	11	"Uaʻaihue" "Stolen"	Jeffrey Hunt	David Wolkove	January 9, 2015	511	11.50
Bryan Wallace (Gerald Downey), a recently out-of-work consultant, sends his family on vacation from Michigan, but is sent to the hospital after being shot. The shooter is revealed to be Lukas Janssen (Henri Lubatti), an elusive art thief who stole a Vincent van Gogh painting and planted it in Bryan's luggage to avoid suspicion. The investigation is assisted by Nicole Booth (Rebecca Mader), an art thief who steals stolen art for money. She also happens to be an outlaw, with a criminal record and series of arrest warrants issued on her already, which comes to Steve's knowledge by Jerry's secret investigation.
105	12	"Poina ʻOle" "Not Forgotten"	Brad Tanenbaum	John Dove	January 16, 2015	512	10.59
Neurosurgeon Christine Dupont (Sarah Jane Morris) is killed. Five-0 investigate and soon realize that it has nothing to do with Delano, after they find one of her former patients dead. The patient was an employee at a local reformatory where four young boys disappeared in 1974. Meanwhile, McGarrett's father's car is stolen and later found in a disassembled state. McGarrett finds the thief, homeless young man Nahele Huikala (Kekoa Kekumano). McGarrett becomes sympathetic of Nahele and decides to help him. Grover's daughter, Samantha (Paige Hurd) continues to have nightmares of her kidnapping.
106	13	"Lā Pōʻino" "Doomsday"	Maja Vrvilo	Story by : Peter M. Lenkov; Teleplay by : Sarah Byrd	January 30, 2015	513	10.50
Joe White (Terry O'Quinn), now a private security contractor, reunites with McGarrett and aids in the transfer of Mitch Lang, who has contracted a new deadly strain of bird flu in the Philippines. However, during the transfer, Lang is hijacked by terrorists. Five-0 believe that it was linked to a hacking on Homeland Security's database, and the terrorists intend to weaponize the new strain by implanted it on bees, which would spread the virus worldwide. In the meantime, Joe confides in McGarrett that his mother is off the grid and promises to find her together. Regardless, McGarrett has Danny spy on him.
107	14	"Powehiwehi" "Blackout"	Peter Weller	Story by : Travis Donnelly; Teleplay by : Eric Guggenheim	February 6, 2015	514	10.08
JC Dekker (Xzibit) is shot while attempting to break into the Halawa Correctional Facility, but he does not remember anything for the three days leading up to that event. Kono gets into an argument with Adam over the fact that she still hasn’t accepted his marriage proposal. The team learn that Dekker was working as a confidential informant for Agent Jeff Morrison (Greg Grunberg) of ICE. Morrison is dedicated to bringing down Roman Zednik, a Bulgarian arms dealer who no law enforcement agency has ever seen in person. Following intelligence obtained from Odell Martin (Michael Imperioli), the team locate Roman’s safe house, shoot all his associates and free a wounded woman named Danielle. Adam and Jerry arrange a peace-offering for Kono. When the true identity of Roman is revealed, Dekker and Kono find themselves in a desperate fight for survival. Finally, Kono interrupts Adam’s business meeting to tell him she will indeed marry him.
108	15	"E ʻImi pono" "Searching for the Truth"	Allison Liddi-Brown	Kenny Kyle	February 13, 2015	515	9.81
Journalist Julius Brennan (A. J. Buckley) is murdered during Chinese New Year. Brennan was covering a genocide in the Congo perpetrated by warlord Roko Makoni (Barkhad Abdi), who was believed to have been killed in an air strike. Elsewhere, Danny learns that his daughter Grace might have a potential boyfriend, when her texts are accidentally forwarded to his phone.
109	16	"Nanahu" "Embers"	Joe Dante	Story by : Akeba Gaddis Lynn; Teleplay by : John Dove	February 20, 2015	516	10.66
Five-0 work together with California-based Bureau of Alcohol, Tobacco, Firearms and Explosives (ATF) agent Kathy Millwood (Melina Kanakaredes) to investigate a series of arson attacks against couples. McGarrett learns that Millwood was not authorized to run the investigation, and that similar arson attacks were committed in California, with one killing Millwood's husband. Meanwhile, Danny takes his girlfriend Amber Vitale (Lili Simmons) on a romantic getaway, but it is cut short when Amber is tracked down by her abusive ex-husband Frank Simpson (David Hoflin) after she left him in New York. Danny is stabbed as he tackles Frank. Elsewhere, Grover and McGarrett practice for a charity golf tournament, and Michelle Wie ends up offering McGarrett some helpful advice.
110	17	"Kukaʻawale" "Stakeout"	Daniel Dae Kim	David Wolkove & Lorenzo Manetti	February 27, 2015	517	9.79
A couple robs a jewelry store and steal $3 million worth of diamonds. The woman, Emma Mills (Jessica Lowndes) shoots her male accomplice Jacob Anders (Zoltán Hayth) and leaves him for dead, but his body has not been found. Believing Anders intends to get revenge on Mills, Danny and McGarrett stake out her apartment to wait for him. Meanwhile, Danny and McGarrett go on another round of therapy and are told to be more caring to each other.
111	18	"Pono Kaulike" "Justice for All"	Larry Teng	Peter M. Lenkov & Ken Solarz	March 6, 2015	518	9.54
U.S. Marshals arrest Danny for Marco Reyes' murder, while IA arrests Chin for conspiracy to commit Reyes' murder. Joe reveals to the rest of the team that Reyes was a CIA asset and they want Danny to pay for his death. Danny signs the extradition form to be transported to a Colombian prison when Marshal Sam Alexander (Raphael Sbarge) implies his family will be in danger if he does not. McGarrett later learns that the CIA was getting close to making a deal with Reyes to get access to $1.3 billion of cocaine in his possession and with Reyes dead, the location of the drugs is unknown. McGarrett offers to find the cocaine for Alexander. McGarrett later realizes that his mother was Joe's source, and that she is the reason McGarrett was not arrested for his involvement too. Meanwhile, Chin realizes that Gabriel Waincroft has tipped off IA about Chin's involvement in exchange for transfer to a minimum security prison. However, Gabriel uses this as an opportunity to murder IA detective Rex Coughlin (Robert Knepper) and escape. Now with no case against him, Chin is released. He later gets a call from Gabriel, who merely tells him "you're welcome".
112	19	"Kahania" "Close Shave"	Jerry Levine	Steven Lilien & Bryan Wynbrandt	March 13, 2015	519	9.38
As McGarrett spends the morning getting a shave from a barber acquaintance Odell Martin (Michael Imperioli), a wounded young man, Eran (Steven Krueger), stumbles in, claiming to be fleeing from an Armenian gang led by the ruthless Garig Dobrian (Mark Ivanir) after witnessing a murder. Moments later, the same gang arrives and surrounds the shop. McGarrett, Eran and Odell barricade themselves inside to wait for help. Meanwhile, Jerry is falsely accused of a series of home invasions. As Max provides an alibi for Jerry's whereabouts, Chin and Grover investigate the home invasion and learning the thief is targeting divorced women.
113	20	"ʻIke Hanau" "Instinct"	Maja Vrvilo	Story by : Peter M. Lenkov & Peter M. Tassler; Teleplay by : Moira Kirland & Eric Guggenheim	April 3, 2015	520	8.87
Grover's oldest and closest friend Clay Maxwell (Mykelti Williamson) and his wife Diane (Kim Wayans) vacation in Hawaii, but one morning, Clay calls Grover to tell him that Diane fell off a cliff to her death. Grover's instinct tells him that Clay pushed her. The rest of Five-0 are skeptical however, and Max has rules Diane's death as accidental as there is no evidence suggest otherwise. However Grover promises to find evidence that shows Clay is guilty. Meanwhile, Danny and Shaw are trapped in an elevator with the dead body of Glenn Hurd, where Danny reveals he has claustrophobia.
114	21	"Ua heleleʻi ka hoku" "Fallen Star"	James Wilcox	David Wolkove	April 10, 2015	521	8.70
Jerry and Max attend an Elvis impersonation convention when during a performance one of the Elvises, Lane Collins, collapses and dies. Max determines the death as cyanide poisoning. Five-0 discover that he was poisoned by crazed fan Jane Miller (Calico Cooper). After the case is closed, gunmen break into the ME's office and steal Collins' body. This then relates back to the episode where the jewels were stolen and never recovered. Meanwhile, Gabriel stalks Chin and asks him to smuggle him out of Hawaii. When Chin returns to his home, he finds Gabriel left behind pictures of Adam Noshimuri.
115	22	"Hoʻamoano" "Chasing Yesterday"	Stephen Herek	John Dove	April 24, 2015	522	8.35
Three middle-aged men on vacation, Nolan Fremont (Jaleel White), Jake Lockhard (Pauly Shore), and Micky Dickson (Kevin Farley), wake up hungover to find a dead woman in their hotel bathtub. When they are arrested trying to bury the body, McGarrett, Danny, and Grover find the men cannot remember the previous night, so they retrace their steps, eventually identifying the victim as Rebecca Oleana, a nightclub waitress. Meanwhile, while Jerry delivers for Kamekona, he witnesses a woman kidnapped in broad daylight. When the car is later found with the kidnapper dead, Chin and Kono work the case and find that the "kidnapper" was the woman's accomplice, the woman is Natalie Morris, who is wanted by the FBI.
116	23	"Moʻo ʻolelo Pu" "Sharing Traditions"	Eagle Egilsson	Story by : Peter M. Lenkov and Ken Solarz; Teleplay by : Jessica Granger	May 1, 2015	523	8.60
Kono sets sail on an outrigger canoe to circumnavigate the islands, only for a severe storm to pass and leaving her stranded at sea. She is forced rely on survival skills taught to her by her mother Nani (Catherine Haena Kim). The rest of Five-0 investigate a series of pharmacy robberies where hoards of drugs which can be used to produce methamphetamine is stolen. The suspect claims he is forced to keep making the drug as his son’s life is threatened.
117	24	"Luapoʻi" "Prey"	Maja Vrvilo	Eric Guggenheim	May 8, 2015	524	8.57
As they prepare for Kono's wedding, Five-0 investigates the murder of a bounty hunter who was pulled over by an HPD officer. A man was in the trunk and injured the police officer, that had pulled the hunter over, killed the bounty hunter, and escaped in the car. It later turns out that the man killed a young girl in New York and her father pays a different bounty hunter to capture and turn over the man. Five-0 must find the father before more people die. Later, Danny meets his ex-wife Rachel who has a secret to confess to him Charlie is his son, who has a serious illness. Also, Chin is concerned that Adam might have returned to his old ways.
118	25	"A Make Kāua" "Until We Die"	Bryan Spicer	Story by : Peter M. Lenkov; Teleplay by : Steven Lilien & Bryan Wynbrandt	May 8, 2015	525	8.27
In North Dakota, a weapon convoy is hijacked by an unknown group. The man leading the group hijacks a plane and forces the pilot to fly to Hawaii. Traces of radioactivity are later found on the plane. As the team prepares for Kono's wedding to Adam, a nuclear bomb is spotted in Waikiki. The team is afraid that it will blow up the city and maybe the rest of Hawaii, so Danny and Steve take it using Kamekona's helicopter and drop it into the ocean. Meanwhile, McGarett deals with his own issues as Catherine returns from Afghanistan. At the wedding, Chin forgets the wedding rings and goes to his car to get them where he is faced by Gabriel Waincroft. Chin tells him that he should shoot him while he has the chance. Some seconds later, Gabriel has mysteriously vanished, leaving Chin confused.

== Production ==
On March 13, 2014, CBS renewed Hawaii Five-0 for a fifth season. Filming began on July 8, 2014, with a traditional Hawaiian blessing. and the season premiered on September 26, 2014.

== Reception ==
=== Ratings ===
No.	Episode	Air date	18-49 rating	Viewers (millions)	Weekly rank	Live+7 18-49	Live+7 viewers (millions)
1	"Aʻohe Kahi e Peʻe Ai"	September 26, 2014	1.2	8.97	N/A	2.1	12.26
2	"Ka Makuakane"	October 3, 2014	1.3	9.77	#23	N/A	N/A
3	"Kanalu Hope Loa"	October 10, 2014	1.2	9.19	#24	1.9	N/A
4	"Ka Noeʻau"	October 17, 2014	1.2	9.18	N/A	2.0	12.09
5	"Hoʻoilina"	October 24, 2014	1.1	8.92	N/A	1.8	11.92
6	"Hoʻomaʻike"	October 31, 2014	1.1	9.47	#22	1.8	12.43
7	"Ina Paha"	November 7, 2014	1.2	8.95	#25	N/A	11.90
8	"Ka Hana Malu"	November 21, 2014	1.4	10.07	#19	N/A	13.26
9	"Ke Koho Mamao Aku"	December 12, 2014	1.1	8.77	#19	1.9	11.95
10	"Wawahi moeʻuhane"	January 2, 2015	1.4	10.51	#6	2.1	13.54
11	"Uaʻaihue"	January 9, 2015	1.5	11.50	#12	N/A	14.38
12	"Poina ʻOle"	January 16, 2015	1.5	10.59	#9	2.3	13.82
13	"La Poʻino"	January 30, 2015	1.5	10.50	#13	2.3	13.90
14	"Powehiwehi"	February 6, 2015	1.3	10.08	#11	N/A	13.27
15	"E ʻImi pono"	February 13, 2015	1.2	9.81	#14	2.0	13.11
16	"Nanahu"	February 20, 2015	1.4	10.66	#13	2.2	13.90
17	"Kukaʻawale"	February 27, 2015	1.2	9.79	#14	2.0	12.92
18	"Pono Kaulike"	March 6, 2015	1.2	9.54	#18	1.9	12.49
19	"Kahania"	March 13, 2015	1.2	9.38	#19	2.0	12.37
20	"'Ike Hanau"	April 3, 2015	1.2	8.87	#13	1.9	11.70
21	"ʻUa heleleʻi ka hoku"	April 10, 2015	1.1	8.70	#17	1.8	11.41
22	"Hoʻamoano"	April 24, 2015	1.1	8.35	#21	1.9	11.35
23	"Moʻo ʻolelo Pu"	May 1, 2015	1.2	8.60	#17	N/A	11.24
24	"Luapoʻi"	May 8, 2015	1.1	8.57	#14	1.8	11.34
25	"A Make Kāua"	May 8, 2015	1.1	8.27	#15	1.8	11.34

== Home video release ==
Hawaii Five-0: The Fifth Season
Set details			Special features
25 episodes; 6-disc set; 1.78:1 aspect ratio; Languages: English (Dolby Digital 5.1, with subtitles); Subtitles in English, Spanish, and Portuguese; Audio commentaries on select episodes.			Shore Lines: Season 5; Aloha Action! Season 5; Five-0 x 100; Five-0 Music; Directing With Daniel Dae Kim; Deleted Scenes; Gag Reel
Release Dates			Shore Lines: Season 5; Aloha Action! Season 5; Five-0 x 100; Five-0 Music; Directing With Daniel Dae Kim; Deleted Scenes; Gag Reel
Region 1	Region 2	Region 4	Shore Lines: Season 5; Aloha Action! Season 5; Five-0 x 100; Five-0 Music; Directing With Daniel Dae Kim; Deleted Scenes; Gag Reel
September 1, 2015	September 14, 2015	Unknown	Shore Lines: Season 5; Aloha Action! Season 5; Five-0 x 100; Five-0 Music; Directing With Daniel Dae Kim; Deleted Scenes; Gag Reel
