= Rob Hanning =

American producer and writer

Rob Hanning is an American producer and writer.

== Writing credits ==
- Castle
- Detroit 1-8-7
- Courting Alex
- 8 Simple Rules For Dating My Teenage Daughter
- Malcolm in the Middle
- Frasier
- Men Behaving Badly
- Class of '96
- Townies (Story Editor)

== Producing credits ==
- Castle (consulting producer)
- Detroit 1-8-7 (consulting producer)
- Courting Alex (executive producer)
- 8 Simple Rules For Dating My Teenage Daughter (co-executive producer)
- Hope & Faith (executive producer)
- Malcolm in the Middle (co-executive producer)
- Frasier (co-executive producer)

== Awards and nominations ==
Hanning had been nominated for two Primetime Emmys.
