= Bryan Spicer =

American film and television director

- Born: April 9, 1964 (age 61); Los Angeles, California
- Occupations: Film director, television director, film producer, television producer
- Years active: 1988–present

Bryan Spicer (born April 9, 1964) is an American film and television director. As a television director, his credits include Castle, 24, House, Heroes, CSI: Crime Scene Investigation, Hawaii Five-0, and Magnum P.I..

Paley Center for Media has preserved the first season Salute Your Shorts episode "Sponge Saga" in its New York archive, which was directed by Spicer.

In 1995, Spicer made his feature film directorial debut with the film Mighty Morphin Power Rangers: The Movie, and in 1997 he directed the films McHale's Navy and For Richer or Poorer.
