= Nikita season 2 =

Nikita
- Season 2
- Blu-ray cover
- No. of episodes: 23

Release
- Original network: The CW
- Original release: September 23, 2011 – May 18, 2012

Season chronology
- ← Previous; Season 1 Next → Season 3

The second season of Nikita, an American television drama based on the French film La Femme Nikita (1990), the remake Point of No Return (1993), and a previous series La Femme Nikita (1997), was announced on May 17, 2011, which premiered on September 23, 2011, at 8:00 pm (ET). The season featured 23 episodes.

== Cast ==
=== Main cast ===
- Maggie Q as Nikita Mears
- Shane West as Michael Bishop
- Lyndsy Fonseca as Alexandra "Alex" Udinov
- Aaron Stanford as Seymour Birkhoff
- Dillon Casey as Sean Pierce
- Melinda Clarke as Helen "Amanda" Collins
- Xander Berkeley as Percival "Percy" Rose

=== Recurring cast ===
- Rob Stewart as Roan
- Lyndie Greenwood as Sonya
- Noah Bean as Ryan Fletcher
- Peter Outerbridge as Ari Tasarov
- Devon Sawa as Owen Elliott
- Alberta Watson as Senator Madeline Pierce
- Peter J. Lucas as Sergei Semak
- David S. Lee as Phillip Jones

== Episodes ==
No. overall	No. in season	Title	Directed by	Written by	Original release date	Prod. code	U.S. viewers (millions)
23	1	"Game Change"	Danny Cannon	Craig Silverstein	September 23, 2011	3X7151	1.85
Nikita and Michael plot to take down Division using information from the black box they acquired. In the meantime, Alex works with Division to track Nikita and the black box in order to find Sergei Semak, the person responsible for killing her family. Amanda is now running Division and has Percy imprisoned underneath Division, and Oversight has assigned Sean Pierce to keep an eye on her. Michael and Nikita learn about Operation Game Change, a secret Division operation of stealing one billion dollars of aid money in Iraq, killing American soldiers in the process. They proceeded to frame investigator Tony Merrick for murder in order to keep him quiet. The couple break Merrick out of prison in order to learn what he knows. However he will only tell them if they save his son, who is now a Division target. When they are cornered by Division agent, they are rescued by Birkhoff, who escaped from Division, fearing Amanda's reprisals for decrypting the black box. Nikita finds Merrick's son and subdues Alex in the process. Exposed from Merrick's evidence, the Oversight member who sanctioned Game Change apparently commits suicide, and Merrick is cleared of all charges.
24	2	"Falling Ash"	Eagle Egilsson	Kalinda Vazquez	September 30, 2011	3X7152	1.73
Michael learns that a failed assassination attempt on United States Senator Charles Irving is related to P9, a corrupt Division program that uses unsuspecting brainwashed victims that turn them into assassins. Michael and Nikita are joined by Owen, who reveals the scientist behind P9, Doctor Joseph Mars, also created the Regimen, and is looking for a cure to it. Michael is reluctant to trust Owen again, but the three join forces. They learn of another attempt on Irving's life by a woman named Alicia, they subdue her and send her to Birkhoff's home. There, they learn she was a former drug addict, having been treated by Mars, who goes by an alias. They break into his office, finding several other test subjects. After Mars is captured, he sets out a signal, reactivating Alicia who returns to kill the real target, a member in Irving's administration; Michael and Nikita subdue her again. Owen leaves, having found the means to "detox" from the Regimen. It is later revealed that Owen is working with Ari Tasarov and Gogol in order to bring down Division.
25	3	"Knightfall"	Ken Fink	Carlos Coto	October 7, 2011	3X7153	1.57
A black box file reveals that an international terrorist named Ramon, who has been taking credit for some political assassinations, now works for Division. Nikita was the agent that captured Ramon years ago and turned him over to Percy. After Ramon assassinates an energy minister in Quebec City, Michael and Nikita track him to a Division compound in Colombia, only to learn Percy made him paraplegic six years ago, and could not have committed the killings, but only uploaded videos of his "achievements". Amanda convinces Alex to kill Anton Kochenko, a man who used to work for Alex's father and is now with Semak. However, she is told to hold off killing him when Nikita captures Ramon before he can upload the video of Kochenko's assassination. Division agents trap Michael in a safe room. Amanda reveals to Nikita that if she does not kill Ramon, she will order the home to be destroyed. Nikita however, convinces Ramon to help Michael escape before the house is destroyed. Although Amanda orders Alex to stand down, she shoots Kochenko anyway.
26	4	"Partners"	Dermott Downs	Kristen Reidel	October 14, 2011	3X7154	1.65
Nikita's old Division partner Kelly has escaped from a Turkish prison. Nikita thought Kelly died four years ago and feels responsible for her imprisonment, because it happened on the mission that Nikita escaped from Division by faking her own death. Michael and Nikita go to Turkey to help her escape the country and start a new life. Amanda orders Alex and Roan to find Kelly first. However on their way to Istanbul it is revealed that Gogol helped Kelly escape so she could find Nikita's black box, but after realising Alex's role in Kochenko's assassination, Tasarov, who is now working for Semak, orders Kelly to capture Alex. Nikita realises Kelly's betrayal before Gogol agents arrive. Gogol is defeated however, and Nikita is forced to kill Kelly after she attempts to shoot Alex. In return, Alex lets Michael and Nikita go.
27	5	"Looking Glass"	Ken Girotti	Albert Kim	October 21, 2011	3X7155	1.69
Michael and Nikita travel to Minsk, Belarus to help Cassandra Ovechkin, a woman Michael fell in love with on a mission six years ago to assassinate her husband, President Valeri Ovechkin in exchange for a double. However, the double is now resorting to the same tyranny as the real Ovechkin. Michael learns Cassandra has a son, Max, and Nikita realizes that Michael still desires a family after the deaths of his. Meanwhile, Amanda sends Division agent Lisa (Shauna Bradley) to stop Ovechkin, but is captured. Sean and Alex work together to rescue her, but are too late when they witness her execution. Sean then resorts to killing Ovechkin. However, their plan is inadvertently inter-twined with Michael and Nikita's plan to rescue Cassandra and Max; Sean places a bomb in Ovechkin's car, which Cassandra enters, though Nikita rescues them beforehand. Sean later succeeds in killing Ovechkin and blaming a dead bodyguard for the crime. Before they part, Nikita realises that Max is Michael's son. Meanwhile, Amanda allows Percy to have more privileges in his cell.
28	6	"343 Walnut Lane"	Nick Copus	Andrew Colville	October 28, 2011	3X7156	1.77
Percy manipulates Alex into meeting Nikita in secret, believing Semak's file would be found on the black box. However, Birkhoff cannot find anything relevant, but finds Nikita's birth certificate, which ultimately leads to Nikita's father Richard Ellison. It is revealed that Percy knows about the father and has Amanda send a strike team to Richard's home; he, Michael and Nikita escape to Birkhoff's home. However, it is revealed that Richard is not Nikita's father; he is a Division plant assigned to take back the black box. Realising the deception, Nikita captures Richard, however Birkhoff's home is later attacked by Roan's team, though Birkhoff fends them off by launching his attack drone. Nikita then kills Richard, and later admits to Michael that he is Max's father, and she killed Richard because she told him that also, and knew that Richard would use this information against him.
29	7	"Clawback"	Eagle Egilsson	Michael Brandon Guercio	November 4, 2011	3X7157	1.79
Division gets word that Ryan Fletcher has been giving Nikita information from prison. Ryan makes a connection that Division has been making hits for Oversight to make a Wall Street raider and former SEC chairman Jonathan Gaines richer. After Nikita learns of a failed attempt on Fletcher's life by Gaines and Oversight, she and Michael sneak into the prison to break him out, but are too late to stop Roan from poisoning him. Nikita later confronts Gaines to reveal the names of Oversight members. However, Amanda orders her team to kill them both; Gaines is killed as he mentions the name Madeline Pierce, but Michael saves Nikita and she escapes. Sean is revealed to be Madeline's son. Meanwhile, Sean and Alex stop Yuri Levrov, a childhood friend of hers who is now working for Semak and has been ordered to kill her. She learns that he believed she was brainwashed by Division and was trying to kill her out of "mercy". Alex fails to convince him otherwise, and Amanda cancels him. Later, it is revealed Amanda faked Fletcher's death to help her take down Oversight.
30	8	"London Calling"	Jeffrey Hunt	Kalinda Vazquez	November 11, 2011	3X7158	1.89
Michael goes to London, England to visit Cassandra's son Max. There, he learns that they are targeted by General Tupelov (Paulino Nunes), who feels that Cassandra is responsible for him not getting power after Ovechkin's death. As Nikita arrives to assist, Tupelov abducts Cassandra and reveals to Michael she took $200 million of his money and wants it back. Birkhoff tracks Cassandra to Canvey Island. However as Michael and Nikita rescue her, Cassandra reveals that she is an MI6 agent. Later, Michael is captured by Cassandra's handlers, and after Nikita rescues him, they realise that her contact wants to get his hands on the money; Nikita kills him before he could kill Cassandra. Meanwhile, Percy gives Alex information to get money from one of his off-shore accounts, with enough money to get revenge on Semak without Division's assistance. However, the transfer also relays a secret activation order to a guardian.
31	9	"Fair Trade"	Nick Copus	Carlos Coto	November 18, 2011	3X7159	1.79
With Michael away in London, Nikita steals $80 million from Oversight, forcing the committee to meet in a bunker under a hotel, so that she can identify them. However, Division is made aware of Nikita's presence during the meeting, and Birkhoff is captured while he attempts to escape and is brought back to Division, where Amanda tortures him for Nikita's location. Michael suggests Nikita make a trade between Birkhoff for the black box. Nikita requests that Sean escort Birkhoff, after realizing he is Madeline's son. However, during the exchange, Sean destroys the black box, and Nikita and Birkhoff escape by helicopter. Meanwhile, Alex poses as a Russian stripper in order to return to Russia. She and other girls are apprehend by Immigration and Naturalization Service (INS) and deported to Saint Petersburg. There she learns that Wallace, the leading INS agent has sold them as prostitutes; Alex kills the traffickers, and later uses Percy's funds to finance the girls.
32	10	"Guardians"	Dwight Little	Albert Kim	December 2, 2011	3X7160	1.68
Guardian Patrick Miller escapes from his house in France, ordered by Percy via Roan, before Owen and Gogol can intercept. Nikita approaches Owen, discovering his dealings with Taserov. Owen is using them to find and destroy the black boxes, however Tasarov desires to release the information against the Americans. Meanwhile, Miller is off to see a regimen scientist in Basel, Switzerland. There, Nikita stops Miller and recovers the black box. However, a firefight between her, Miller and Gogol alert the local police, who arrest Nikita and Miller. After discovering Owen's connection to Nikita, Tasarov captures him. Gogol intercept the police convoy and steal the black box. Before they can kill Nikita, Michael, having been called from London by Owen to save her. Nikita decides to follow Tasarov and the black box to Russia, while Michael and Owen hunt for Miller and the other guardians, who are meeting together as part of "secondary protocol". Amanda revokes Percy's privileges after learning that he sent Alex to Russia. However, Percy says that he sent Alex there so she could learn something; Alex breaks into her childhood home to see that her mother Katya is still alive.
33	11	"Pale Fire"	Deran Sarafian	Kristen Reidel	January 6, 2012	3X7161	1.56
Nikita follows Tasarov to the Udinov estate to take back the black box, only to encounter Alex. They decide to work together to help Katya escape. However in the process, Alex is captured by Semak. As Nikita comes to rescue both Alex and Katya, she learns that it was Katya who alerted Semak of Alex's presence, as he made her believe Alex was turned by Division. It is also revealed that Katya survived because she and Semak had an affair. After failing to retrieve Katya, Nikita and Alex escape the estate. Meanwhile, Amanda places Ryan in Percy's cell, so the two of them can figure out how to take down Oversight, which is also Amanda's goal. Michael and Owen follow the guardians to Amsterdam. After killing one of them, they are made aware of their meeting place. Michael infiltrates the meeting by posing as the dead guardian, after which he uses the opportunity to destroy the black boxes before escaping with Owen. Later, they deduce that Percy is using the guardians to break him out of holding.
34	12	"Sanctuary"	Steven A. Adelson	Andrew Colville	January 13, 2012	3X7162	1.49
Alex and Nikita decide to work together again. Sean, in a bid to protect his mother from Nikita, tracks her down through the tracker he placed in Alex's father's watch, but is captured. Knowing he is acting alone, they convince him to join their cause to defeat Percy. Birkhoff finds that Amanda placed a bug on Sean's phone to keep an eye on him. Oversight convene and realize that Division run by Amanda is no better than Percy's management, and decides to enact "Clean Sweep", a fail safe Percy set up when he formed Division, which will release VX nerve gas, which would kill everybody in Division. Amanda learns of Percy's attempt to escape, and has placed Division on high alert for anything out of the ordinary. Realizing that the information in the black boxes will be released if Percy dies, Amanda decides to place him in an induced coma. Before the procedure starts, the guardians hold the Oversight members captive, and demand that Amanda release Percy or they will enact Clean Sweep.
35	13	"Clean Sweep"	Brad Turner	Kalinda Vazquez	February 3, 2012	3X7163	1.45
Amanda believes there is a saboteur in Division when she finds that the safe to deactivate Clean Sweep from inside the base is rigged with explosives in case it was tampered with, and Roan is her prime suspect. To avoid detection, Roan removes his tracker, and kills those who attempt to disarm the bomb. Alex, under Birkhoff's instructions, returns to Division in order to activate the emergency generator that used to run the missile silo that Division situates. In the meantime, Amanda decides to release Percy. Percy would later kill his escorts and arrive at the house where the guardians are holding Oversight. Michael, Nikita and Sean, who already arrived there, catch Percy. Nikita threatens to kill Percy unless the guardians release Oversight. However, Percy orders them to kill all Oversight members apart from Madeline. Later, they are ambushed by a Gogol strike team. As Nikita rescues Madeline, Percy initiates Clean Sweep, though Alex successfully overrides it. She later locks herself in Percy's cell to avoid Roan's reprisal. Percy then escapes with Miller. After calling Amanda, Madeline realises that she is losing control of her. It is further revealed that Amanda is working with Gogol.
36	14	"Rogue"	Marc David Alpert	Carlos Coto	February 10, 2012	3X7164	1.45
Amanda is now in full control of Division. She offers Alex a chance to reclaim Zetrov and reveal her true identity to the world, in order to weaken Semak and rescue Katya. Percy draws Nikita out by targeting Carla Bennett, a mentor who took her off the streets when she was a junkie before her arrest for murdering a police officer. Michael and Nikita find her through Madeline. However as they meet it is discovered that Amanda is also after her, having placed her on top of her kill list, even above Percy. As Percy intercepts Carla, she agrees to come with him on the condition that he lets Nikita live. Alex uses a Division satellite to track Percy's chip. Michael and Nikita rescue Carla as Division agents storm the hideout. However Percy escapes and jams his chip. Back at the safehouse Carla reveals that she was the one who created Division.
37	15	"Origins"	Michael Robison	Albert Kim	February 17, 2012	3X7165	1.51
Nikita and Michael try to help Carla remember events from her past, which may hold the key to defeating Division. Carla tells the story that how Percy planned to make Division grow and introduces Amanda to her. Later, Amanda frames Carla, using false evidence that she is going to expose Division to Congress and Percy sanctions a hit on Carla. But Brian, the hitman, was trained by Carla and gives her a chance to escape. Later, Amanda finds out that Carla is alive and kills Brian. Meanwhile, Alex appears at a Zetrov press conference where Sergei Semak is speaking and announces that she is Alexandra Udinov, then proposes a trade; her mother for the Zetrov empire. Semak decides to kill her instead. Ari records his conversion with Semak and sends a killer to Alex's suite to kill her but she survives and escapes. Later Alex appears at the press conference and declares that she will be taking over Zetrov. Carla calls Percy and offers her help to restore Division to what it was; a program to create heroes. She tells him that Ari and Amanda are working together.
38	16	"Doublecross"	Eagle Egilsson	Kristen Reidel	March 16, 2012	3X7166	1.51
Division agents are being killed. Michael realizes they were agents he ran to work against Gogol. It is revealed that Percy is responsible for the killings and blaming Gogol for them. Amanda asks Nikita for help in capturing Percy, and she will release Fletcher in exchange, though Amanda intends to have them killed afterwards. Nikita captures Percy in Manhattan through tracking another dead agent. Carla contacts Miller and Roan about the exchange. During the exchange, Birkhoff reveals to Carla that they know she is working with Percy, and kills her when she refuses to surrender. Miller dies, but Percy and Roan escape. Meanwhile, Alex returns home in Russia with Sean as her bodyguard. They work to rescue Katya, only to find that Semak took her beforehand. Tasarov believes they should move up their plan to eliminate Semak. Sean copies the files on his laptop, and learns that Cassandra is working in MI6 as a Gogol mole.
39	17	"Arising"	Karen Gaviola	Andrew Colville	March 23, 2012	3X7167	1.46
Alex learns from Semak that Katya had actually run away. Upon realising Cassandra is a Gogol mole within MI6, used to assassinate Semak, Michael and Nikita confront her during a mission in Moscow. There, they realise that Tasarov intends to frame her team for Semak's death. When Michael and Nikita foil the plan, Tasarov is forced to kill Semak himself. He then sends a Gogol strike team to kill the MI6 team, but Michael dispatches them, allowing the team to escape back to England. However, by then Tasarov leaks Cassandra's Gogol profile to MI6. Michael, Nikita and Cassandra evade the latter's team, rescue Max and fake their deaths by destroying their plane. Meanwhile back in Russia, Alex and Sean discover that Katya is in a woodland cabin, under guard by Division agents. Amanda and Tasarov offer them a deal; their lives in exchange for the control shares of Zetrov. Alex however, refuses. After escaping from the agents, Alex says goodbye to her mother as she vows to fight with Nikita.
40	18	"Power"	Chris Peppe	Carlos Coto	March 30, 2012	3X7168	1.32
Nikita and friends learn that Amanda and Tasarov have stolen a Helium-3 replicator prototype, a device that can produce a new energy source, in their bid to take over Zetrov. During their first failed attempt to intercept the replicator, Amanda wounds Nikita, but could not bring herself to kill her before escaping. Michael and Nikita follow Amanda to Zetrov's headquarters in Moscow in another attempt to retrieve the replicator. In the meantime Amanda leaves Sonya in charge (Lyndie Greenwood). Working with an inside man, Percy allows himself to be captured, and through an unwitting Birkhoff, convinces Division that Amanda is working with Gogol, and hence takes back control of Division. Nikita takes the replicator, but is forced to seal herself in a containment vault when she is surrounded. Amanda drains the oxygen from the vault, but Nikita plays dead and escapes, but letting Amanda live. Zetrov fires Tasarov and appoints Alex their new chief executive officer, a position she passes on to friend Ilya Levkin. Without support, Amanda and Tasarov are on the run, but with a black box.
41	19	"Wrath"	Jeffrey Hunt	Albert Kim	April 20, 2012	3X7169	1.39
Percy releases Nicholas Brandt, an arms dealer and old foe of Nikita's, from a CIA detention facility in Norway; Brandt will hand over the plutonium Division failed to acquire before, if they give him Nikita. Brandt's methods are however unorthodox even by Division's standards; he begins by killing Madeline Pierce in a car bomb. Knowing Sean is his next target, Nikita and the others watch over Madeline's funeral. Brandt however captures Nikita and tortures her in an abandoned house. Percy learns that Brandt wants something else in the deal; Michael. After Michael drinks a sedative, Brandt relinquishes his plutonium, and send Michael to the house. However, Alex, Sean and Birkhoff find their location thanks to Michael's tracker, and kill Brandt. The ordeal brings Michael and Nikita closer together following their strains earlier in the season.
42	20	"Shadow Walker"	Nick Copus	Kristen Reidel	April 27, 2012	3X7170	1.29
Nikita convinces Birkhoff to use $20 million of his own money to meet with Ian Damascus, who has Percy's funds. However, Damascus uses the money to hand over to Percy. Angered that his money is gone, Birkhoff splits off from the group to get more by hacking into an old network, inadvertently trips a trap set by the FBI, which gets him arrested. Division is alerted of his arrest and Percy sends in a team to retrieve him, however Nikita gets to him first. While the two battle Division agents in the precinct, Michael and Alex realise Percy put the money in one of three trucks he sent, and after a guess, Michael and Alex follow the wrong one. However, Birkhoff deduces which truck holds the money. Because there is no time to recover the money before Division agents arrive, the team agree to destroy the truck. Percy starts searching for new funds, while Alex partly reimburses Birkhoff with some of her Udinov fortune.
43	21	"Dead Drop"	Michael Robison	Kalinda Vazquez	May 4, 2012	3X7171	1.22
Nikita and Michael travel to Germany to buy a set of nuclear triggers before Percy can get his hands on them, however, a Division team intercepts them. To stop Percy from completing his plan to build a nuclear bomb, Ryan Fletcher turns to Morgan Kendrick, the new director of the CIA. However, during a meeting a suspicious Nikita bugs Kendrick, and the team realize he is working with Percy. As Kendrick organizes another meeting with Fletcher, he realizes he is working with Percy under duress; there is a kill chip inside his pacemaker. Michael and Nikita send Kendrick underground, where the kill chip cannot be activated, and deactivate it, though in the process Sonya discovers Birkhoff's safe house; Alex rigs the house to explode when a strike team arrives, and they move to Fletcher's safe house. Sean and Alex share their first kiss.
44	22	"Crossbow"	Danny Cannon	Andrew Colville	May 11, 2012	3X7172	1.25
Robbie returns and steals three 20-year-old motherboards relevant to Project Crossbow, a missile defense satellite, from an Air Force base. Nikita and her entourage find the only remaining member of Crossbow, Donald Henderson. However, he dies after Nikita and Michael stop a Division strike team. Birkhoff later realizes that Crossbow is a satellite that can fire a particle beam. Sean and Alex find Robbie at a nuclear reactor and capture him. However, he escapes and activates a device before Sean kills him. They believe that the device sends the satellite to fire the weapon at the facility and escape before it explodes. Percy uses the weapon as leverage to blackmail President Charles Grayson into backing out of a peace treaty between Afghanistan and the Taliban. Nikita decides to return to Division. While Sean and Alex subdue the sentries (they must be kept alive, otherwise Division is alerted of a breach), Nikita and Michael enter Division through the hatch Nikita previously escaped through. (Note: In the episode "All the Way") One of the sentries kills the other, alerting Division of Nikita's presence, just as she destroys the servers controlling Crossbow.
45	23	"Homecoming"	Eagle Egilsson	Carlos Coto	May 18, 2012	3X7173	1.42
The president sends Marines to prepare a strike against Division. Percy reveals to Grayson that Crossbow is a bluff; it never worked, he is instead using his triggers to destroy nuclear reactors. He is willing to stand down so long as he has immunity from prosecution. Realizing that Roan has the second trigger, Sean and Alex evade the Marines to find him. After Michael takes operations, Nikita finds Percy in his office; if he dies, Roan will be alerted and detonate the trigger. Nikita forces Percy to admit to Division that he criminalized it, but goads Division agents to kill him. Nikita must escape Division with Percy alive. He then tries to drop Nikita down the hatch she entered earlier, but she gets the upper hand, and he falls to his death. Before Roan can activate the trigger underneath Washington, D.C., Alex and Sean intervene, resulting in Roan's electrocution. To prevent more bloodshed, Nikita convinces the Vice President to let her back into Division and get the officers to surrender, which succeeds. Fletcher later arrives; he will run Division to clean up its own mess and locate Percy's financer (David S. Lee), and Amanda, who has the remaining black box.
