= Nikita season 4 =

Nikita
- Season 4
- Blu-ray cover
- No. of episodes: 6

Release
- Original network: The CW
- Original release: November 22 – December 27, 2013

Season chronology
- ← Previous; Season 3

The fourth and final season of Nikita premiered on November 22 and ended on December 27, 2013, consisting of six episodes. It is based on the French film La Femme Nikita (1990), the remake Point of No Return (1993), and a previous series, La Femme Nikita (1997).

== Cast and characters ==
=== Main cast ===
- Maggie Q as Nikita Mears
- Shane West as Michael
- Lyndsy Fonseca as Alexandra "Alex" Udinov
- Melinda Clarke as Helen "Amanda" Collins
- Aaron Stanford as Seymour Birkhoff/Lionel Peller
- Noah Bean as Ryan Fletcher
- Devon Sawa as Owen Elliot/Sam Matthews

=== Recurring cast ===
- Lyndie Greenwood as Sonya
- David S. Lee as Phillip Jones
- Alex Carter as Matthew Graham
- Judd Nelson as Ronald Peller
- Vincent Ventresca as Trevor Adrian
- John Getz as Senator Ed Chappell

== Episodes ==
No. overall	No. in season	Title	Directed by	Written by	Original release date	Prod. code	U.S. viewers (millions)
68	1	"Wanted"	Eagle Egilsson	Kristen Reidel	November 22, 2013	4X5251	0.74
Three months after being accused of president Kathleen Spencer's murder, Nikita continues her run in Canada. Meanwhile, Alex, accompanied by Sonya, is trying to find the Shop's location and goes to Mumbai, India, to figure out their next move. Willing to do everything in order to clear her name, Nikita returns to the United States and meets Dale Gordon, a reporter for the news channel ENN — who she thinks can help her clear her name by telling him the truth. This, however, is a setup by Amanda and rest of the Shop, who are using Gordon as a trap, into which Nikita unwittingly falls. Trying to save herself, Nikita decides to kidnap Gordon. She is saved when Michael makes a deal with the FBI's head director Matthew Graham. On her way to meet Michael, when Nikita is finally able to escape out of the trap, she is shot by Graham, who is revealed as another member of the Shop. Realizing Gordon might help Nikita expose the truth, Graham arranges to have him killed in a bomb explosion. Meanwhile, Alex, who finds out about the Shop's next move in India, is taken by Owen (who now uses his real name — Sam).
69	2	"Dead or Alive"	John Badham	Albert Kim	November 29, 2013	4X5252	0.86
Nikita, who was shot by Graham, is saved by Michael and the others. After Graham frames Nikita publicly for setting up the bomb that killed Dale Gordon, Ryan discovers that the Shop is using people to replace Graham as well as others. Sam/Owen contacts Nikita and reveals that he is looking for revenge by using Alex, who is going to help him find Amanda's location. Birkhoff and Ryan come up with a plan to stop Graham's attacks against Nikita. However, when Michael and Nikita go to kill Graham, Amanda connects to Nikita to warn her that the real Matthew Graham is alive and she will kill him if Nikita kills the impostor. Alex is taken by the CIA, while Sam is able save Sonya. Ryan deduces that The Shop are planning to start a war between the United States and Pakistan, by stating that Pakistan bought Nikita to kill the president. Also, the tension between Michael and Nikita grows after Michael states he is done fighting for them.
70	3	"Set-Up"	Marc David Alpert	Carlos Coto	December 6, 2013	4X5253	0.85
Tension grows between the United States and Pakistan after Amanda plants evidence that Pakistan hired Nikita to kill the president. Alex is framed by the CIA for sending Nikita money and helping her. Meanwhile, Ryan tries to find the next impostor that The Shop are going to use and he thinks that it's Birkhoff. Ryan tries to prove it by showing that Birkhoff saved the next impostor. However, Birkhoff reveals to Nikita that his real name is Lionel Peller and that the next impostor by The Shop is actually Ronald Peller — his father. In order to save Birkhoff's father, Nikita decides to use the impostor to find The Shop's location and save the real one. Michael and Sam are forced to team together in order to save Alex from the CIA. Nikita is forced to kill the impostor after he tries to assault Birkhoff. Meanwhile, Amanda learns the true identity of Birkhoff and the fact that Ronald is his father, and is even more interested in destroying Shadownet.
71	4	"Pay-Off"	Dwight Little	Terry Matalas & Travis Fickett	December 13, 2013	4X5254	0.64
Jones calls Nikita and offers her and the team complete freedom by wiping away their identities and faking their deaths, only if they quit their mission. After Nikita refuses his offer, Jones decides to stick to the plan and send a missile from Pakistan to the United States. The team lands the plane on a secluded Pakistan air strip, but a local drug czar and his men storm the plane and demand a bribe of ten million dollars, so Nikita calls Alex for money. In Zurich, Switzerland, Alex attempts to take the money. After she pulls diamonds out of a safe deposit box, Sam sees an opportunity to recoup his losses and contemplates stealing the diamonds, leaving Alex in danger. While leaving Alex in the hotel, he sees that someone is sent to kill Alex, so he returns to save her. Alex realizes that Sam is a threat. Michael confronts an old adversary, Ramon, who is also used by The Shop. Meanwhile, Birkhoff gets a message from his father who helps them in finding The Shop's location. The team goes to Dubai to stop The Shop, who decide to send the missile there. During the attack, Amanda feigns her death.
72	5	"Bubble"	Nick Copus	Oliver Grigsby	December 20, 2013	4X5255	0.69
Nikita and the team are held in CIA custody at a Naval base. The CIA insists that Nikita tell the whole world about the runnings of Division. After revealing the truth about Division and The Shop, Nikita receives positive feedback and is named a "national heroine". Meanwhile, Alex goes to Paris, France, to save Owen/Sam from a group of men who he owes money. After saving him they admit their feelings for one another and have sex. Ryan is convinced that Amanda is still alive so he goes to visit Jones for answers. However, when he visits Jones, Ryan is attacked and captured, and later sent to Amanda for interrogation. While being used as hostage, Ryan learns that there are seven other people/impostors who are working with Amanda, and later, while trying to escape, Ryan is shot and mortally wounded, so he commits suicide by throwing himself out of the window. Nikita arrives at the hospital where a dying Ryan reveals to her the whole story. A vengeful Nikita is even more convinced to kill Amanda and the others after Ryan's death, so she decides to ask Alex for help, which she agrees to give.
73	6	"Canceled"	Eagle Egilsson	Albert Kim & Carlos Coto	December 27, 2013	4X5256	0.82
Nikita has flashbacks of her time in Division. The Marines are sent to stop her and start shooting, so Michael, Birkhoff and Sam try to convince Nikita to back off. When Nikita kills the rest of the Group, Alex is forced to attack her from behind to save her life. After Alex, Birkhoff and Nikita are arrested, Michael and Sam decide to team up to get them out by tracking down and releasing the Group's imprisoned victims, whose doubles are under Amanda's control throughout the world. While under arrest, Nikita is visited by Amanda. She is in full control now that all members of the Group are dead. However, Nikita is freed and imprisons Amanda, revealing that she did not kill the other members; she faked their deaths to track down Amanda. Nikita leaves Amanda locked up in the prison, where nobody can find her. Alex and Sam start a relationship, Birkhoff reveals more information about Shadownet to the public, and Michael and Nikita–who are happily married–move to Mompiche, Ecuador, and vow to keep going on missions.
