= Nikita season 3 =

Nikita
- Season 3
- DVD cover
- No. of episodes: 22

Release
- Original network: The CW
- Original release: October 19, 2012 – May 17, 2013

Season chronology
- ← Previous; Season 2 Next → Season 4

The third season of Nikita, an American drama/espionage television series based on the French film La Femme Nikita (1990), the remake Point of No Return (1993), and a previous series La Femme Nikita (1997), was announced in May 2012 and premiered on October 19, 2012.

== Cast and characters ==
=== Main cast ===
- Maggie Q as Nikita Mears
- Shane West as Michael Bishop
- Lyndsy Fonseca as Alexandra "Alex" Udinov
- Aaron Stanford as Seymour Birkhoff
- Noah Bean as Ryan Fletcher
- Dillon Casey as Sean Pierce
- Devon Sawa as Owen Elliot
- Melinda Clarke as Helen "Amanda" Collins

=== Recurring cast ===
- Lyndie Greenwood as Sonya
- Peter Outerbridge as Ari Tasarov
- Michelle Nolden as President Kathleen Spencer
- David S. Lee as Phillip Jones
- Isaiah Mustafa as Cyrus

== Episodes ==
No. overall	No. in season	Title	Directed by	Written by	Original release date	Prod. code	U.S. viewers (millions)
46	1	"3.0"	Eagle Egilsson	Craig Silverstein	October 19, 2012	3X7351	0.95
Division, now under the leadership of Ryan Fletcher, is tasked by the government to track down rogue agents, nicknamed the "Dirty Thirty", who refused the recall order following Percy's death. Their first target is Martin, who is using his services to eliminate undercover CIA operatives in Hong Kong for the Ministry of State Security (MSS). Michael and Nikita are sent there to bring him in. They find that Martin is having an affair with a model during his cover as a photographer. When Martin notices the couple nearby, he kills her and warns local police, where Michael is later arrested for her murder. Alex arrives to assist Nikita while Sean Pierce works to release Michael from custody. However, after Nikita saves Martin's next target, Martin has the MSS retrieve Michael, while also revealing to Nikita that Amanda made contact with him, tricking him and other rogue agents after the recall order that they would die once they turn themselves in. As Michael is being transferred, Martin aims a sniper rifle at him, only to be shot dead by Alex. After the mission, Michael proposes to Nikita.
47	2	"Innocence"	John Badham	Mary Trahan	October 26, 2012	3X7353	0.81
Wade is Division's next target after he has stolen RDX. Wade used to train Division recruits before beating one to death for failing to kill a target, and was replaced by Michael. After finding his hideout they find a young girl, Liza Abbot, who Wade kidnapped and trained into a child soldier. Nikita tries to get to her, but Liza manages to escape Division when Wade attempts to attack it. It is later revealed Wade is going to complete the failed mission, to kill Saeed Tamir, who is now an ambassador of Pakistan. Nikita realizes that Liza kept an Indian girl necklace with her, so she has Alex take a similar necklace from Liza's mother. Nikita finds Liza and, using the necklaces, manages to get through to her, and she abandons the mission, while Michael finds and kills Wade. Alex and Nikita later reunite Liza to her parents.
48	3	"True Believer"	Danny Cannon	Carlos Coto	November 2, 2012	3X7352	1.14
Ryan allows one of the rogue agents, Mia, to continue her undercover mission to infiltrate Third Wave, a domestic terrorist group who stand against the "tyranny" of the first world. After Mia is arrested from an FBI raid, Alex and Nikita break her out of prison. However, Mia turns on them and wounds Alex, revealing that she lost faith in Division and joined Third Wave's cause. Division later finds Third Wave's compound and raid it. Mia awaits and straps herself with a bomb to allow the leader, Joshua, to escape before overpowering Nikita. Despite this Nikita still believes Mia can be saved. Birkhoff finds several foreign bank accounts affiliated with Joshua, and was paid to attack a United States senator. Nikita stops Mia, who reveals another terrorist is carrying the bomb. Nikita convinces her that Joshua is corrupt like Percy was and they work together to stop the would-be suicide bomber, but Mia is killed by Herek's guards in the process. Meanwhile, Michael and Sean take down Joshua and his private security guard partner.
49	4	"Consequences"	Nick Copus	Kristen Reidel	November 9, 2012	3X7354	0.86
Amanda orders former Division cleaner Anne to break Owen out of a Russian prison regarding "Operation Skeleton Key", a cryptograph that allows users to hack into anything. Owen is the only remaining person to know its location. He escapes and later sends Michael and Nikita to recover Skeleton Key from a cemetery. The two are ambushed by Anne and ex-Gogol agents, who steal the cryptograph. One of the wounded mercenaries is brought back to Division, where doctors unwittingly unleash a vial of sarin from his lungs. Amanda later uses the cryptograph to release a video warning to destroy Division. Sonya tracks Amanda to a hideout in Luxembourg with Ari Tasarov. A team is sent to retrieve the cryptograph, while Owen confronts Amanda to learn who he was before Division (Amanda erased his memories). Amanda admits to Ari that getting Owen was the mission the entire time. However, the mission is abandoned when Nikita finds Owen, allowing Amanda, Anne and Ari to escape. Meanwhile, Sean admits to Alex, who has secretly turned to drugs again, that he loves her, but does not wish to have a relationship if she remains in Division. Birkhoff realizes that Amanda has a mole inside Division.
50	5	"The Sword's Edge"	Kenneth Fink	Albert Kim	November 30, 2012	3X7355	1.20
For six years, a rogue Division agent has gone undercover as Alexi Markov and is now the president of Uzbekistan. Division is able to capture him, but he reveals that should anything happen to him, his people would release a video to the media to expose Division. Ryan releases him after he reveals to Nikita that should Division be exposed, President Kathleen Spencer will order the termination of every agent. However, Birkhoff finds another video in Markov's harddrive revealing he will assassinate the President. The team decides to save the President's life in the White House without her knowing; Michael is able to pose as Markov while Nikita captures the real one, before Michael fakes his death, while Birkhoff uses a computer worm to erase Markov's videos. Meanwhile, Alex uncovers a murder plot against Owen. She learns that one of the agents, Carl wants him dead for killing his lover years before.
51	6	"Sideswipe"	Joshua Butler	Terry Matalas & Travis Fickett	December 7, 2012	3X7356	1.19
Nikita and Michael capture arms dealer Cyrus, who was planning to purchase a weapon-jamming device called "Sideswipe" from an Egyptian general in St. Lucia. He offers to help get to his buyer, Ari Tasarov, but during the purchase, Cyrus apparently double crosses them and escapes. However, Nikita finds clues that the sale with Ari will happen in Romania. Cyrus is betrayed by Amanda, who captures him. Michael and Nikita track him to an abandoned church in Andalusia, Spain. They find him with a bomb strapped to him, while Amanda wants to help Nikita "learn". Nikita realizes that Amanda wants her to suffer, not die, so she stands next to Cyrus, forcing Amanda to deactivate the bomb. Meanwhile, Cyrus was forced to admit to Amanda about Romania, so Ari has mercenaries attack Alex and her team, only to be defeated by Sean, who destroys Sideswipe. Ryan decides to reinstate Cyrus. Birkhoff learns that Sonya is the mole, and upon confronting her learns she is working under duress, having had a kill chip installed, and there is a second mole following her.
52	7	"Intersection"	Dwight Little	Michael Brandon Guercio	January 18, 2013	3X7357	1.27
After Birkhoff tells Nikita about Sonya's predicament, the team work to uncover the second mole watching Sonya. Michael learns of Alex's relapse to drugs, and urges her to tell Nikita and get clean. She is forced to admit to Nikita after the rest of the team see pictures of them together. They are being followed by the Watchman, a rogue agent who specializes in surveillance. The team lures the Watchman, where Nikita manages to follow and capture him, after Division traces his messages to Amanda to Quebec City. As Michael and Nikita wait to attack Amanda, Alex discovers the second mole is agent Baker and subdues him as Birkhoff deactivates Sonya's kill chip. Michael and Nikita chase Amanda and Anne, resulting in an accident where Michael's right hand is caught under the car. After Nikita kills Anne, she cuts off Michael's hand before their car explodes. Amanda escapes.
53	8	"Aftermath"	Brad Turner	Carlos Coto	January 25, 2013	3X7358	1.53
After three weeks, Michael is recovering from his injury and given a prosthetic hand, though he still has to get used to it, and is having trouble adapting with it for field work. Nikita and Owen team up to take down rogue Division cleaner Liam. Liam has branched out to drug cartel leader Guillermo Garza and is helping his men who are surrounded by Mexican police. Liam instead kills the men to get to the laptop, but has to escape without it and blows up the building once Nikita and Owen arrive. Division learns of the laptop, containing Garza's fortune, which is being held at a federal building in Houston, Texas. Liam turns on Garza to get the laptop for himself, but is killed by Owen before he can. Michael and Nikita's relationship becomes strained as he watches her work with Owen. Alex works to detox herself.
54	9	"Survival Instincts"	John Showalter	Albert Kim	February 1, 2013	3X7359	1.23
Division's next target is Ray after they find he is selling intelligence for weapons. After he kidnaps Kate Barrett, his ex-wife, Nikita and Owen pose as federal agents to help the local police, which includes Kate's new boyfriend. When they find that Ray is holding Kate somewhere in Allegheny National Forest, Sean arrives to help, though Alex is dismayed to learn she cannot return to the field yet. Ray learns Division is onto him and after exposing them to the police, Ray systematically kills Division agents. Nikita finds Ray's hideout, rescues Kate and kills Ray. She also convinces Kate not to reveal Ray kidnapped her, to keep Division secret. Alex and Sean reconcile. Michael decides not to return to work field missions again, and begins to value Owen as Nikita's partner in the field. Birkhoff later approaches Nikita to tell her there might be a way for Michael to get his hand back.
55	10	"Brave New World"	Marc David Alpert	Kristen Reidel	February 8, 2013	3X7360	1.34
Birkhoff tells Nikita about Heidecker, who helped develop kill chips and other technologies for Division. Recently, Heidecker pays monthly visits to Kosovo to check on Deputy Prime Minister Kosta Beciraj. Beciraj lost a leg following a failed assassination attempt by the CIA, but it had since been "regrown" with real flesh and blood over carbon-fiber bone. Nikita goes on a secret mission to retrieve Heidecker alone so he could bring "back" Michael's hand, until Alex and Michael discover this. After Nikita is captured by Kosovo Security Forces, Alex and Michael go after her. After they rescue her, Alex assassinates Beciraj and blames it on a bodyguard. They escape with Heidecker, but after the team learns that Heidecker is using children as lab rats for his experiments, Nikita kills him when he turns on them. Spencer's advisor Evan Danforth is apparently impressed with Division's assassination of Beciraj and hands Ryan four files of secret assignments, much to Nikita's chagrin, as she does not want Division to return performing kill missions.
56	11	"Black Badge"	David Grossman	Mary Trahan	February 22, 2013	3X7361	1.24
CIA analyst Naomi Ceaver comes across a file detailing Madeline Pierce’s involvement with Division and turns it over to the Director of the CIA, Morgan Kendrick. Division believes Amanda is targeting him. When Kendrick is killed in a car bomb, Amanda frames Sean for the assassination. Ryan convinces Sean to turn himself in so they can find the real man behind the murder. They find the man, Ellis Toyon, however Amanda had already killed and cleaned him. She also calls Nikita to tell her that she has insured that Sean will not be proven innocent. In order to save Sean, Nikita and Alex decide to fake his death and recruit him to Division, in a similar fashion to how it used to get its recruits. Bringing him back to life proves to be a challenge when Ceaver reveals she is a Gogol spy working for Amanda, ordered to kill Sean. Alex saves Sean as Nikita dispatches Ceaver.
57	12	"With Fire"	Eagle Egilsson	Carlos Coto	March 1, 2013	3X7362	1.01
Ari Tasarov turns himself into Division, revealing to having split off from Amanda after she incidentally got international authorities after him. He believes that Amanda has gone too far and is aiding a terrorist group, called the Crimson Resistance, to perform random terrorist attacks and blame them on Division. Ari is willing to help Division stop her in exchange for $50 million. Following a grande attack in Pittsburgh, and a drive-by shooting in Romeo, Michigan, believing Ari is stalling, Nikita resolves to torture the information out of him, until she realizes that Ari intends to use the money to help his son, Stefan, while Ari himself accepts whatever fate awaits him. Ari eventually reveals that the terrorist Amanda is helping is Saalim Azar (Piter Marek). After Alex and Owen prevent the third attack, Amanda executes Saalim. Division is able to find Saalim's location and delete everything that Amanda used to frame Division for arming him. Amanda decides to go after Stefan.
58	13	"Reunion"	Jon Cassar	Terry Matalas & Travis Fickett	March 8, 2013	3X7363	1.37
Amanda sends her mercenaries to capture Stefan from a private school in Switzerland, but is saved by his bodyguard Amon Krieg. Alex and Nikita arrive and retrieve him, but are facing off against Amanda's crew. Alex loses Stefan to the mercenaries, while Nikita fights Amanda. They both end up captured by Krieg to find his charge. When he disappears to find Alex, Nikita and Amanda work together to escape, but Amanda abandons Nikita. Krieg confronts Alex and after she confirms that she is following Ari's wishes, they work together to save him. After they rescue him, Alex leads the mercenaries away while the other two escape before local police arrive to arrest Alex and the mercenaries. Nikita plans to spring Alex from police custody before they return to Division, however, Amanda captures Alex first.
59	14	"The Life We've Chosen"	Brad Turner	Albert Kim	March 15, 2013	3X7364	1.21
Amanda holds Alex in South Ossetia, while telling her that sooner or later, there will be a rift between Alex and Nikita. Amanda offers to release Alex in exchange for Ari. Ari believes she wants him to decrypt the black box; Amanda will no longer find use for him after he does. Ryan authorizes the exchange but implants Ari with a kill chip when the exchange goes through, without Nikita's knowledge. She soon finds out anyway, and she convinces Owen, who is holding the trigger, to abandon the idea of his execution. Alex befriends another prisoner, Larissa, and during an escape attempt, Larissa is shot and they are both recaptured. The exchange later takes place, after which Nikita intends to rescue Ari. However, Alex decides to find and rescue Larissa. Alex and Sean storms the hospital, but in the process a soldier fires a grenade launcher, and the room carrying Larissa explodes. In the meantime, Nikita and Owen cause a distraction as Ari is forced to use his code for the black box. Ari attempts to escape, but is shot by Amanda. Before he dies, Ari hands Nikita the black box he recovered.
60	15	"Inevitability"	Mark C. Baldwin	Kristen Reidel	March 29, 2013	3X7365	1.22
CIA agent John Little is killed in Paris, France, by the president of Chad, Pierre Batouala; Little helped Batouala become President for American oil interests in the region. Since Batouala has a list of other CIA agents in his possession, Nikita wants to lead a mission to assassinate him. Disgusted, Alex refuses to take part in the mission. The mission is sabotaged by Zoe, one of the Dirty Thirty, who shoots Batouala and hands the list to Amanda, who wishes Zoe to sell it to Russian buyers. Meanwhile, Alex and Birkhoff follow Danforth, leading to a discovery of a kill house replica of Division. They deduce that Danforth personally set Division up on the mission so he can authorize the termination of its agents. Alex alerts the agents and plans to kill Danforth to save themselves, however Nikita believes the correct course of action is to find Zoe. After Nikita finds and kills her, she confronts Danforth, having revealed Division has a recording of him in the black box, and convinces him to call off the strike mission, or his involvement would be exposed.
61	16	"Tipping Point"	Dwight Little	Oliver Grigsby	April 5, 2013	3X7366	1.23
Michael and Nikita break into a building that Heidecker visited to work for an organization Birkhoff calls "the Shop", who produce sophisticated technology. They find a recording of Heidecker, who presents Michael a prosthetic hand, which will be attached if they break into a biotech lab in Nanjing, China, and steal a prion. They succeed, and arrange an exchange; Michael's hand would be attached if she delivers the prion to the Shop. The Chinese also finds them; after Nikita neutralizes them, she hands the prion to an automated car. Meanwhile, Sonya stops a plan to destroy the tracker array of all agents. Ryan fears Division agents are plotting a mutiny after Alex told them about Danforth's contingency. Alex, Sean and Sonya discover that Rachel is leading it, but during interrogation Ryan learns that Alex is the true engineer; Alex shoots Ryan, who is left in a coma by the time Nikita returns.
62	17	"Masks"	Chris Peppe	Kamran Pasha	April 12, 2013	3X7367	1.15
When Danforth is found dead, Owen, who was tailing him, goes to clean his home. Amanda waits for him and manages to restore the memories of his past life as Sam Matthews, a sociopathic Delta Force soldier who killed all but one in his unit for trying to take him out of the cut for heroin smuggling in Kosovo. After Owen finds and kills the last survivor in his unit, he captures Nikita and hands her over to Amanda, who tells him to steal the black box and sell it as payment. Amanda tells Nikita that she also brainwashed Alex in South Ossetia by using her survivor guilt as an escaped sex slave to turn against Nikita; Larissa never existed, but her idea was a catalyst. Alex, meanwhile, hacks into Birkhoff's system and disables the tracking array. With enough agents on her side, Rachel moves up Alex's plan to a hostile takeover of Division, capturing Michael (who was fighting Owen when he learns he stole the black box), Birkhoff, Owen, Sean and Sonya in the process. Rachel tells all the other Division agents to join in their fight for freedom, or be killed on sight.
63	18	"Broken Home"	John Badham	Terry Matalas & Travis Fickett	April 19, 2013	3X7368	0.97
Amanda puts Nikita into a psychotropic trance and makes her imagine she is in the home of Matthew Collins in 1987. Matthew was an army psychologist who ran experiments on his daughter Helen to prevent PTSD on soldiers for years while her twin sister Amanda looked on. It is revealed that Helen killed both Amanda and her father and took her sister's identity; Amanda was Helen. Meanwhile, in Division, Chris orders Birkhoff to shut down Shadownet, but Birkhoff overpowers him and halts the funds transfer to the rest of Division's mutineers. He is later forced by Owen, also trapped in Division, to help him escape via elevator. Instead he releases Michael and Sean from holding, who capture Owen. Michael decides to allow Owen to escape so he can follow him to Amanda and Nikita. When Michael arrives, Amanda and Owen escape. When the mutiny goes out of hand, Alex kills Rachel when she tries to have Birkhoff killed. After Sonya saves Birkhoff by killing Chris, Birkhoff calls an end to the mutiny, and allows those who want freedom to leave. Sean is revealed to be injured during the crossfire, and dies from internal bleeding in Alex's arms.
64	19	"Self-Destruct"	Nick Copus	Kristen Reidel	April 26, 2013	3X7369	0.95
Ryan recovers and learns that all but fourteen of Division's 300 agents have left. To prevent the President from finding out he plans to destroy Division and effectively fake everybody's deaths. Alex has left and goes on a rampage against a local drug and human trafficking gang in Camden, New Jersey. Nikita searches for her and learns Alex is heading for the gang's headquarters. After Nikita is being guided there by corrupt detectives, she finds that Alex stole the gang's funds and is handing them to the prostitutes she released from their imprisonment. Nikita and Michael help Alex get out of her rampage alive and convince her to rejoin Division. After Ryan gives away cover identities and money for the remaining agents, Nikita convinces Ryan to postpone the plan to destroy Division until they find the black box and stop Amanda.
65	20	"High-Value Target"	Dan Sackheim	Michael Brandon Guercio	May 3, 2013	3X7370	1.03
Running on a tip from Cyrus, the team hears that Owen/Sam is running an auction for the black box in a G-20 summit in Toronto, where the intelligence agencies of Brazil, China, Germany, Russia and Turkey are bidding. As Alex, Michael and Nikita embark on the mission to retrieve the black box, a SEAL team arrives, having known about the exodus of its agents. Spencer is willing to allow the agents' freedoms if they succeed in capturing the black box. The Germans win the bid, but the German agent kills his men and leaves before Alex could intercept. Furthermore, a group retrieves Amanda, who Owen imprisoned. Spencer orders containment after the failure, but Birkhoff, Cyrus, Ryan and Sonya hide. Owen finds Amanda at the docks, and although Amanda escapes, he destroys the black box before disappearing. The team send visual proof of the black box's destruction to Spencer, who calls off the SEAL team and grants them freedom. Their celebration is short-lived however, when they realize Amanda has allied herself with the Shop.
66	21	"Invisible Hand"	Dwight Little	Carlos Coto	May 10, 2013	3X7371	1.01
After learning one of Amanda's Shop partners is called Smith, Nikita survives a trap by the organization in an automated car. Birkhoff recovers a chip from the car that leads to the Shop's secret satellite network, where the team learns Smith is going after Miriam Hasan, a human rights activist that threatens their child kidnapping operation. After Miriam offers Alex a job as a special envoy on human trafficking at the United Nations, Smith attacks Miriam, but is then killed by Nikita. Birkhoff finds a Shop facility in Michigan. Michael and Nikita capture a biologist who was developing an upgraded version of the kill chip, by using nano-cells to rupture every blood vessel in the subject. When the team realize Miriam was infected in the attack, Alex and Michael save her using their only vial of the antidote. Nikita tracks down Amanda, who reveals that the entire mission was a red herring; Miriam was not infected, but Michael is; the nano-cells were laced inside his prosthetic hand. Amanda is willing to give her the antidote if Nikita assassinates Spencer.
67	22	"Til Death Do Us Part"	Eagle Egilsson	Albert Kim	May 17, 2013	3X7372	1.00
Amanda bugs Nikita and threatens to activate the nano-cells if any attempt is made to warn Michael. After Nikita leaves Division, the rest of the team discover that she is bugged. Birkhoff jams the signal long enough for Nikita to alert Michael of her dilemma. Alex and Michael find one of the original scientists on the nano-cells project, only to be killed from the nano-cells by Phillip Jones, one of the leaders of the Shop, before an antidote can be made. Michael lies to Nikita that he has been cured. Nikita stands down and alerts Spencer, but then sees Spencer kill herself; framing Nikita was Amanda's actual goal. To save Michael, Alex and Sonya effectively "kill" him long enough to let the nano-cells die out. Before they can revive him, Amanda sends the rest of the Dirty Thirty, now under her employ, to attack Division. As the team appear outnumbered, Nikita arrives in time, having escaped the White House, and kills the rest of them. After Michael is revived, the team leave Division and destroy it. However, the Spencer who shot herself was actually a double; the real President was captured at the G-20 summit and imprisoned. As the team work out a way to clear Nikita's name, she decides to go on the run, leaving Michael and her engagement ring behind.

== Production ==
The series was renewed for a third season on May 11, 2012, which premiered on October 19, 2012. The show was filmed in Toronto, Ontario, Canada.
