= Pilot (Nikita) =

- Nikita episode
- Episode no.: Season 1 Episode 1
- Directed by: Danny Cannon
- Teleplay by: Craig Silverstein
- Original air date: September 9, 2010

Guest appearances
- Rob Stewart as Roan; David Ferry as Gary; Sebastien Roberts as Daniel Monroe; Rothaford Gray as General Safwani

Episode chronology
← Previous —	Next → "2.0"
- Nikita (season 1)

"Pilot" is the series premiere of the American television series Nikita. It premiered in the United States on The CW on September 9, 2010. The episode was written by series creator Craig Silverstein and directed by Danny Cannon.

This episode introduces the series' main characters and the motivation behind the title character Nikita's mission to bring down a secret agency in the government called Division. "Pilot" received mostly positive reviews from television critics. It was watched by 3.6 million viewers and earned a 1.9 rating for women 18–34, matching the CW's highest rating ever in the Thursday 9:00pm timeslot and drawing the largest audience that the CW had had in over a year and a half.

== Plot ==
After escaping from a secret unit of the government known as Division three years ago, Nikita (Maggie Q) suddenly resurfaces when she visits her abusive foster father Gary (David Ferry) and tells him what happened to her after she had run away from his house as a teenager. She became addicted to drugs, and six years ago, she reportedly killed a police officer, though she cannot remember whether she did so or not. She was sentenced to death, but Division faked her execution and trained her to be an assassin. However, she broke one of their rules by falling in love with a civilian, Daniel Monroe (Sebastien Roberts). Division had Daniel killed in what appeared to be an accident, and this prompted Nikita to escape. Nikita explains all of this to Gary, knowing full well that doing so would alert Division to her presence.

Meanwhile, in Detroit, Alex (Lyndsy Fonseca) is captured by the police during a failed robbery, while her accomplice escapes. Shortly after being brought to prison, Alex wakes up to find herself inside Division. Michael (Shane West), Division's second-in-command, informs Alex that they have faked her death and that she is being offered a second chance - an opportunity to serve her government. She soon meets two other recruits, Thom (Ashton Holmes) and Jaden (Tiffany Hines), as well as Amanda (Melinda Clarke), Division's psychologist who also assists in training the recruits. Amanda guesses correctly that Alex had been smuggled to the US after being sold to human traffickers in Ukraine.

Percy (Xander Berkeley), the head of Division gets wind of Nikita's reemergence and assigns Michael to kill her. Nikita once again gets Division's attention by visiting Daniel's grave. A strike team is sent to go after her, but, during the attack, Nikita captures Birkhoff (Aaron Stanford), Division's head technician. She demands that he give her access to Division's computer network. Even though he doesn't comply, she lets Birkhoff return to Division unharmed.

In spite of Nikita, Percy decides to go ahead with all of Division's operations, including Operation Black Arrow, in which the head of a West African nation is targeted for assassination. Nikita learns about Black Arrow from an unknown source and sabotages the mission. Nikita then comes face-to-face with Percy and Michael at a government fundraiser and tells Percy of her intentions to destroy Division. Michael chases her out of the building and has the opportunity to kill her, but he hesitates. He tells Nikita that Percy cannot be stopped because he has evidence of every illegal Division operation ever done and that this information would irreparably damage the US government. Michael decides to let Nikita escape, but she shoots him in the shoulder before running off, claiming that she is protecting him since the wound would make it look like he tried to stop her.

Percy immediately names Nikita Division's priority target and believes that she is working with someone who is giving her information on Division's operations. It is revealed that Alex is Nikita's source inside Division and that Nikita was Alex's accomplice during the robbery that resulted in Alex's recruitment into Division.

== Production ==
The episode was written by developer and executive producer Craig Silverstein, while being directed by CSI: Crime Scene Investigation veteran Danny Cannon.

== Reception ==
=== Ratings ===
Premiering in the Thursday 9:00pm timeslot after The Vampire Diaries, the pilot episode of Nikita matched the CW's all-time best ratings in that time period among women 18-34 (1.9/5) and was viewed by the CW's largest audience in over a year and a half with approximately 3.6 million viewers. This debut also improved upon the season premiere of Supernatural in the same timeslot a year earlier. The CW aired a repeat of "Pilot" the next day, which earned a rating of 0.8 for adults 18–49 with 2.61 million viewers.

=== Reviews ===
"Pilot" received mostly positive reviews from critics and drew comparisons to earlier incarnations of Nikita in the TV series La Femme Nikita, the French film by Luc Besson, and the American remake. Metacritic reports that the episode garnered an average score of 66 out of 100 from critics, which is considered "Generally favourable", with mostly positive and mixed reviews. Ken Tucker of Entertainment Weekly praised the show, saying, "Slick in the best way, Nikita is a fresh new take on the gorgeous-but-agonized-assassin character." New York Times reporter Alessandra Stanley commended Nikita as "surprisingly sophisticated and satisfying" and called it "darker and more hard-nosed" than La Femme Nikita. Robert Bianco of USA Today called Nikita "a well-woven tale, with the different strings hanging together nicely and leading off in a few directions you might not expect."
