= Nikita Mears =

Fictional character in Nikita

- Nikita character
- Maggie Q as Nikita
- First appearance: "Pilot" (2010)
- Last appearance: "Cancelled" (2013)
- Created by: Craig Silverstein
- Portrayed by: Maggie Q

In-universe information
- Aliases: Josephine Besson; Malia Watson; Roxanne Barnes; Ellen Connor; Anna Harcourt; Emma Jordyn; Susan Mason
- Nicknames: Nikki; Nik; The Gun Lady; Rookie
- Occupation: Spy; Assassin
- Family: Gary and Caroline Mears (Foster parents; Deceased); Pham Anh (Biological mother; Deceased)
- Spouses: Michael (husband)
- Children: Max Ovechkin (Step-Son)
- Nationality: Vietnamese American

Nikita Mears is the primary protagonist and eponymous character of Nikita, an American action drama television series, which debuted in September 2010 on The CW. She is played by American actress Maggie Q. The series follows Nikita's efforts in bringing down Division, a secret agency that trained her into becoming an agent and assassin, but betrayed her by killing Daniel Monroe, a civilian she fell in love with. She recruits Alexandra Udinov (Lyndsy Fonseca) into helping her destroy Division from within.

Q was in talks to appear on the series as the title character in February 2010, and it was her first time working on a television series. She was chosen for the role because series creator Craig Silverstein believed Q had qualities that would fit the character: "beautiful, who could fight," and be believable with a gun. The actress meanwhile was intrigued by the original Nikita film and Luc Besson's creation of a flawed female character. The series also deals with Nikita and Michael's romantic tension, then relationship, described by the fans as "Mikita." The character and Q's portrayal garnered mostly positive reactions from critics. Q performs her own stunts in the series.

== Character arc ==
Orphaned as a teenager, Nikita turns to drugs and crime. She comes across a halfway house run by Carla Bennett (Erica Gimpel) and temporarily gets clean until she relapses and murders a police officer. Nikita is arrested and sentenced to death. She attracts the attention of Division, a secret American agency that recruits young criminals by faking their deaths and then train them to become assassins. For three years, Nikita was trained under Michael (Shane West), and committed assassinations. After she begins a relationship with civilian Daniel Monroe (Sebastien Roberts), Nikita learns that Division has become corrupt under the leadership of Percy (Xander Berkeley). In one mission, Nikita is part of a team to assassinate a family of Russian oligarchs; the Udinov family. Nikita defies Division by saving the life of the daughter, Alexandra. After Division kills Daniel as it is against their policy for agents have relationships, she becomes a rogue agent intent on stopping Division, tracks down Alexandra (Lyndsy Fonseca), who had since become a drug addict and sex slave, and saves and trains her. Nikita arranges Alex to be arrested for murdering a man Division was targeting. Inside, Alex helps Nikita stop Division's illegal missions.

During the first season, Nikita gains some allies to aid in her fight against Division, including Owen Elliot (Devon Sawa), a guardian to one of Division's several black boxes; hard drives contain files of Division's missions, until Percy tried to have him killed, CIA analyst Ryan Fletcher (Noah Bean) who was investigating black operations invisible to the United States government, and eventually her trainer Michael, after he learns Percy was responsible for the deaths of his wife and daughter. The two would be in a relationship for the rest of the series' run. By the first-season finale, Alex learns that Nikita killed her father and leaves her to become a free agent for Amanda (Melinda Clarke), Division's psychologist who overthrew Percy to lead Division with the help of Oversight, a group of American politicians who ensure that Division's existence remains secret from the public (Alex would later return to fight along with Nikita again midway through season two). Michael is discovered to be working with Nikita and the two end up on the run together with a black box.

In the second season, Nikita and Michael team up with Seymour Birkhoff (Aaron Stanford), a Division computer programmer who left the agency to avoid Amanda. In "Looking Glass", Nikita learns that during an operation, Michael impregnated his asset, Cassandra Ovechkin (Helena Mattsson) and eventually tells him he has a son. The couple's relationship faces some tension due to that development, but they appear to reconcile after Michael decides to put Cassandra and his son Max (who calls her "The Gun Lady") behind him. In the meantime, Nikita learns about the existence of Oversight, and reunites with Carla Bennett, who is revealed to be one of the founders of Division, until her death. "Wrath" explores Nikita's dark side when she is captured and tortured by Nicholas Brandt, an arms dealer Nikita tortured during her days in Division. Nikita confesses to Michael that "there is evil" in her, but Michael assures her it is only a part of her. After the two are rescued, the ordeal brings Michael and Nikita closer. The two eventually sneak into Division and kill Percy after he has regained control of it.

In the third season, Ryan takes charge of Division to clean up its own mess by recalling all the agents at which point President Kathleen Spencer (Michelle Nolden) will grant the agents freedom (as all were recruited against their will). However, Nikita later learns the President will have Division terminated should they fail. Nikita and others work to find rogue agents who refused the recall order, nicknamed the "Dirty Thirty", until her efforts are focused on Amanda, who is also on the run and later working with a company nicknamed "The Shop", who developed sophisticated technologies, some of which was used by Division. Michael and Nikita become engaged, but their relationship faces further tension after Nikita cuts off his right hand to save his life. An advanced prosthetic is eventually discovered, but it is later revealed to have been laced with nano-cells that would kill Michael unless Nikita assassinates Spencer. When Michael lies to her that a cure has been found, Nikita stands down. However Spencer shoots herself in the head (she is later revealed to be a double by The Shop; the real Spencer was captured and imprisoned). Framed for her death, Nikita becomes that most wanted person in the United States. She goes on the run, but leaves Michael behind.

== Characterization ==
=== Creation and casting ===
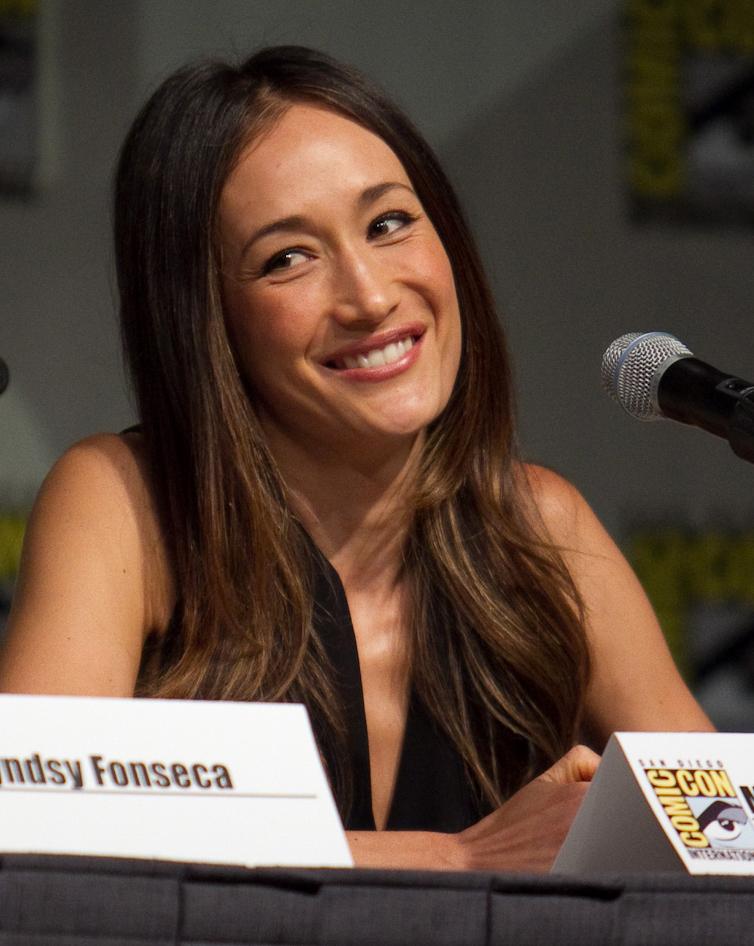
Maggie Q plays the series' eponymous character.

The CW was looking to create a female-driven action series. Creator Craig Silverstein discussed with Warner Bros. about the previous incarnations of Nikita (the original 1990 film, and La Femme Nikita) and wished to make the current television series look fresh. Silverstein wanted to follow Nikita after she left the agency, as that chapter was yet to be told in the previous incarnations. He also believed it would have done the original story justice. Also, he wanted to include a highlight of Nikita's original story in the pilot to earn the title, and then move on from there. Silverstein described Nikita's transition in a Collider interview; "It's a dark fairytale. This girl is taken from one life, her identity is erased, she's put in another life and she's transformed. It's like Alice in Wonderland. She's told, "Eat this, drink that, steal this, kill that," and she's not told why. And, she begins to find her own identity through that. It's just a great story."

In February 2010 it was announced that Maggie Q was in talks to play the title character of Nikita. Q's casting would mark the highest-profile series role for an Asian actress on a broadcast drama series. Q was drawn to the series because she was intrigued by the original film and Luc Besson's creation of an incredibly flawed female. According to the actress the process of her casting took about four to five days. In describing Q's casting, Silverstein stated:

Before we knew who Nikita was going to be, we all talked about how impossible it was going to be to cast this role. It had to be someone who was beautiful, who could fight, who you could believe holding a gun and who you believed was smart, in order to plan everything that she was doing. You'd think those things would be easy to find in an actor, and they're not. We had actors come in and these girls would be gorgeous and smart, but you'd put a gun in their hands and it didn't work. The second we heard Maggie's name, Danny Cannon, our director, and I looked at each other and were like, "Yes!" It was really early on in the process.

— Craig Silverstein

Appearing on Nikita would be Q's first television role. During an interview with IGN, Q explained that she had not been on television before "not because I didn't want to. I just never thought about it," adding "When this came up, everything just felt right. I knew McG and when Wonderland came on he was like, 'This is you, we're not doing this without you.' and I went 'That's very sweet!' So it felt right."

=== Development ===
Because the CW is a fashion-orientated network, there were times Nikita had to be dressed in a certain way to get her noticed by her targets. Q liked the idea, but at the same time wanted Nikita's dress sense to be "toned down a bit" because she is an assassin. In one scene in particular Q had to wear a red bikini in the pilot, which "mortified" her. She added "that red bikini was the bane of my existence. You're not going to see me in a bikini again, that's for sure. [...] I was like, 'Danny, can you put me in a one-piece?,' and he gave me that red bikini. I was like, 'That's not a one-piece. That's a two-piece with a string.'" However, Q did not have to cover her tattoos like she had to in the films, as it was in keeping with who the character is; a hardcore, street kid.

Q performs her own stunts in the series. The actress liked to have her character "be able to do her own thing," as it is an action series where females play lead roles; during her film career, she noted "but in movies, alongside big action men, we've always got to take a step back and let the men shine. And in this, it's about the women who know what they're doing." At some point Q set up a three-week long training period for the rest of the cast to make their fight scenes in the series believable; she had her partner, an action director, bring his stunt team to train them. In filming the stunts she was already used to working in an environment where filming in television would be faster than in American films, because of her time starring in films in Asia, which usually took two to six weeks.

One of the more prominent aspects of Nikita's character development since the beginning of the series is her relationship with Michael, and has been dubbed by fans as "Mikita". Unlike other works on film and television, Silverstein did not play the traditional "Will They/Won't They?" game between the two characters. Co-star Shane West stated "It's not hard to bring Michael and Nikita together," but it is "really hard to keep them apart...We're barely into the season yet, so why not keep teasing?" When the first season started airing, West also expected that their romance would come, citing Michael and Nikita's past relationship while she was working with Division. Now that the two are together by the end of the first season, in the second season Silverstein wanted something to happen to get in their way, saying that no new tension would make the relationship boring, adding "I don't think you can just have them happy and in love, kicking ass together forever."

== Reception ==
"Q gives the impression of trying to get things over in a businesslike fashion. In the action scenes, this is quite effective. In all other scenes, this is merely effective. It's as if she has made a choice to play the character with a pronounced detachment. Or perhaps, deciding to keep her bad acting low key, she has arrived at a decent approximation of bare competence, which is one way to do it, but what am I prattling about? As ubiquitous bus-shelter ads attest, Q looks confident holding a gun and is not averse to wearing either leather or lace, thus meeting the maximum requirements for the job."

— Troy Patterson of Slate magazine

Nikita and Maggie Q's portrayal of the character was met with generally positive reactions from television critics. Nikita was included in TV Guide's lists of "TV's Sexiest Crime Fighters" and "TV's Toughest Ladies". Alessandra Stanley of The New York Times felt that Q was suited for the role, stating "she has a solemn, exotic beauty and hauteur that echo the heroine's self-possession and cool relentlessness," adding "Nikita is noticeably more hard-boiled and less girlish than the undercover agent played by Jennifer Garner on Alias, or the C.I.A. rookie that Piper Perabo plays on Covert Affairs." Troy Patterson of Slate felt that "Ms. Q's Nikita is only half so crush-worthy as Bionic Woman's Jaime Sommers or Dollhouse's what's-her-name, but her predicament is no less tasty." Robert Bianco of USA Today believed Q's performance was "a fairly sizable incentive" to watch the show, adding she "combines stunt-fighting chops and lithe beauty with an unusual-for-the-genre air of somber intelligence. Her Nikita is not above cracking a joke, but it's clear from Q's eyes and bearing that she has suffered at the hands of evil men, and she's not going to take it anymore." Alan Sepinwall of HitFix believed that Q "carries herself in a way that makes it believable she could be a hard-core killer, and she has the requisite dramatic chops and charisma for the part." Maureen Ryan of AOL TV said "Maggie Q, has real charisma and presence; she invests Nikita's drive to bring down the secretive Division with potent energy. You have to believe that Nikita would devote her life to wreaking vengeance on the people she views as her former captors, and you also have to buy her as a butt-kicking, gun-toting action heroine who also looks great in a cocktail gown. Maggie Q makes all those things look easy."

Some other critics however, did not react so warmly towards Q's Nikita. Chris Conaton of PopMatters felt that Q "seems to be a good choice for the title role," but noted that the pilot did not call attention to the character's background. That said Conaton stated "it's still something of a novelty to build a TV series around an Asian American lead—though plenty of recent ensemble and reality TV shows have featured prominent cast members of Asian descent." Matthew Gilbert of The Boston Globe felt that Q was "too much of a sad sack," adding "Q doesn't seem able to layer any other emotions over her cold resolve," and compares the character to "a little bit like [Saturday Night Live character] Debbie Downer." Mary McNamara of The Los Angeles Times believed that while Nikita "provides some sizzle," her emotions "run that famous distance from A to B, as do virtually [every other character]."

Before the show started airing, Q posed for several billboard posters. However, they were met with some controversy for being revealing, and several locations across the United States, including in areas of Chicago, Los Angeles and New York, refused to allow them to be put up, as they were located near churches and schools. Rick Haskins, the marketing executive for the CW, stated "we've been down this road a few times with some of our campaigns."
