= Lyndie Greenwood =

Canadian actress

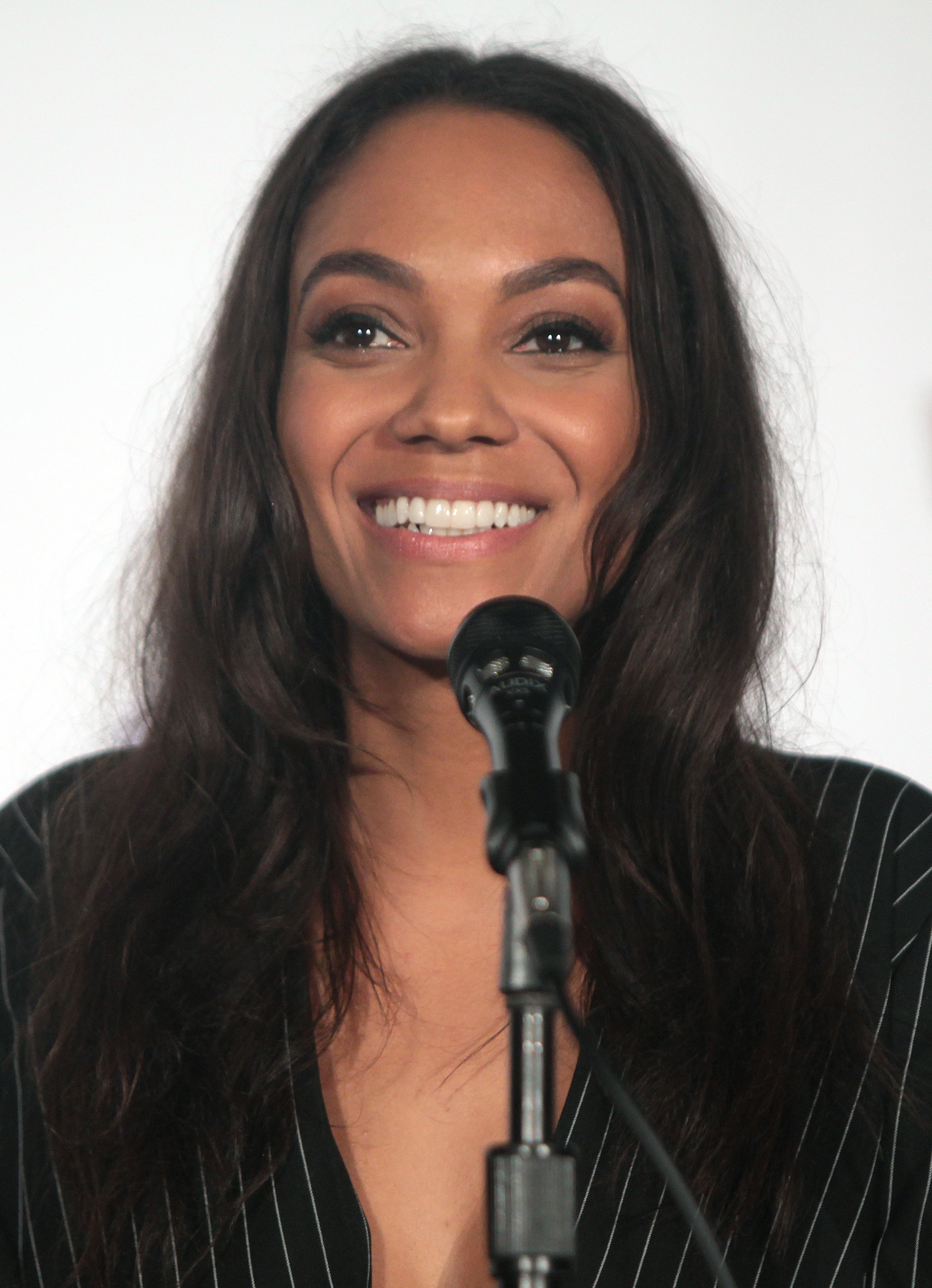
- Greenwood in 2016.
- Born: June 6, 1983 (age 42); Toronto, Ontario, Canada
- Occupation: Actress
- Years active: 2009–present

Lyndie Greenwood (born June 6, 1983) is a Canadian actress best known for her recurring role of Sonya on The CW's Nikita and being a series regular cast member of FOX's Sleepy Hollow, playing the role of Jenny Mills in 2013. In 2019, she joined the cast of the Amazon Prime Video series The Expanse in the recurring role of Dr. Elvi Okoye. Beginning in 2021, she has been acting and leading in several Hallmark movies.

== Career ==
Born and raised in Toronto, Greenwood studied dance in school and is also well-versed in martial arts. She attended several voice and musical theater schools in Canada. She began acting training at multiple schools including the Professional Actors Lab, Jason Fraser Studios, Etobicoke School of the Arts and also at University Settlement Drama Group. She attained a Bachelor of Science degree from the University of Toronto in 2006. Her first role onscreen was in a low-budget Canadian movie Pinkville. She made her television debut on an episode of The Listener. She made many guest appearances on television such as Rookie Blue, Flashpoint, Being Erica, Covert Affairs, Lost Girl and Saving Hope. She has also appeared in minor roles in short-form movies such as Little Phoenix and the Fists of Fury and as Jenn in The Exit, which she claims was her favourite role. She was also cast in This Movie Is Broken. Her career took off in 2011 when she was cast in a recurring role as Sonya on The CW's popular Nikita series. After the success of season 2 of Nikita, she was retained for seasons 3 and 4. In August 2013, she was cast in a recurring role on FOX's Sleepy Hollow. In January 2014, she was promoted to series regular for season 2. In 2019, she was cast in a recurring role as Dr. Elvi Okoye, a biologist working for the Royal Charter Energy (RCE), on the science fiction Amazon Prime Video series The Expanse.

She began starring in Hallmark movies in 2021, and has been promoted to leading actress starting with Girlfriendship in 2022, along with Tamera Mowry-Housley and Krystal Joy Brown.

She stars in the new 2023 workplace comedy series Shelved on CTV. Lyndie Greenwood and cast was nominated for Best Ensemble Performance, Comedy at the 2024 Canadian Screen Awards.

== Filmography ==
=== Film ===
Year	Title	Role	Notes
2009	Pinkville	Natalie Anders	
2010	This Movie Is Broken	Blake's Girlfriend	
2010	The Exit	Jenn	Short
2010	Sundays at Tiffany's	Jane's Friend #2	TV movie
2010	Little Phoenix and the Fists of Fury	Phoenix	Short
2011	Furstenau Mysteries	Clara	Short
2013	The Husband	Bartender	
2015	Tales from the Darkside	Joss	TV movie
2016	Cut to the Chase	Nola Barnes	
2017	Flint	Adina Banks	TV movie
2020	Pooka Lives	Susan	
2021	Every Time a Bell Rings	Maizy	TV movie
2022	Girlfriendship	Renee	TV movie
2022	Holiday Heritage	Ella	TV movie
2023	Magic in Mistletoe	April	TV movie
2024	CrimeTime: Free Fall	Hadley	TV movie

=== Television ===
Year	Title	Role	Notes
2009	The Listener	Admissions Nurse	Episode: "Inside the Man"
2010	Rookie Blue	Keisha	Episode: "Bullet Proof"
2010	Flashpoint	Kelly	Episode: "Follow the Leader"
2010	Being Erica	Kendra	Episode: "Moving on Up"
2011	Covert Affairs	Nurse	Episode: "Begin the Begin"
2011–2013	Nikita	Sonya	Recurring cast: season 2-4
2012	Lost Girl	Lana	Episode: "Table for Fae"
2012	Saving Hope	Dalia	Episode: "Blindness"
2012	Degrassi	Roots manager	Episode: "Building a Mystery: Part 1"
2013–2017	Sleepy Hollow	Jennifer "Jenny" Mills	Recurring cast: season 1, main cast: season 2-4
2014	Partners	Danni Parker	Episode: "Another Man's Wingtips"
2018–2019	Star	Megan Jetter	Recurring cast: season 3
2018–2021	S.W.A.T.	Erika Rogers	Recurring cast: Season 1 & Season 4
2019–22	The Expanse	Dr. Elvi Okoye	Recurring cast: season 4, guest: season 5-6
2020	Into the Dark	Susan	Episode: "Pooka Lives!"
2023	Shelved	Wendy Yarmouth	Series lead
