= List of Nikita characters =

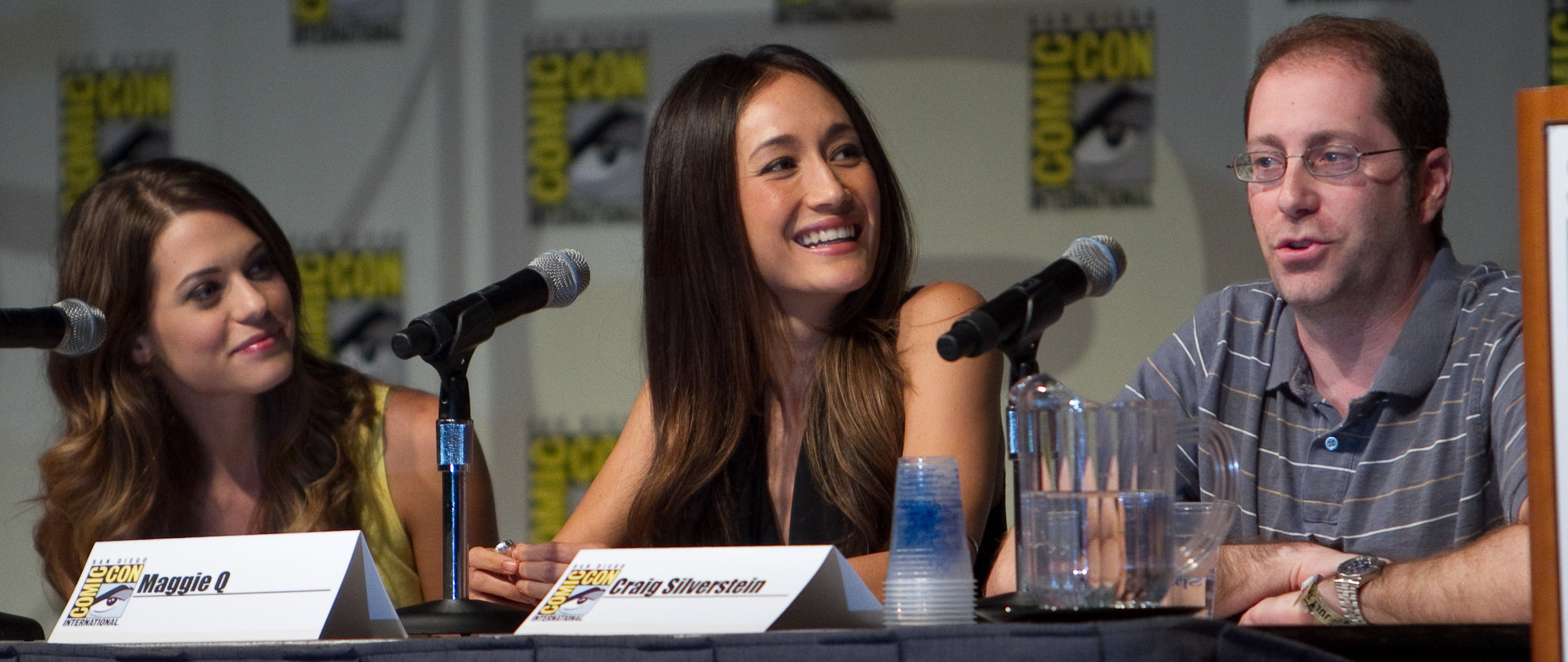
Lyndsy Fonseca, Maggie Q, and Craig Silverstein at a panel for the television series Nikita at San Diego Comic-Con in July 2010.

Nikita is an American spy drama which premiered on September 9, 2010, on the CW Television Network. The series is based on the French film La Femme Nikita, the film's remake: Point of No Return and a previous series La Femme Nikita. The series stars Maggie Q as Nikita Mears, the title protagonist of the series, as a rogue spy and assassin whose mission is to bring down the secret government agency called Division. Other main cast members include Shane West as Michael, Lyndsy Fonseca as Alexandra "Alex" Udinov, Aaron Stanford as Seymour Birkhoff, Ashton Holmes as Thom, Tiffany Hines as Jaden, Devon Sawa as Owen Elliot, Noah Bean as Ryan Fletcher, Dillon Casey as Sean Pierce, with Melinda Clarke as Amanda Collins and Xander Berkeley as Percival "Percy" Rose.

== Main characters ==
=== Nikita Mears ===
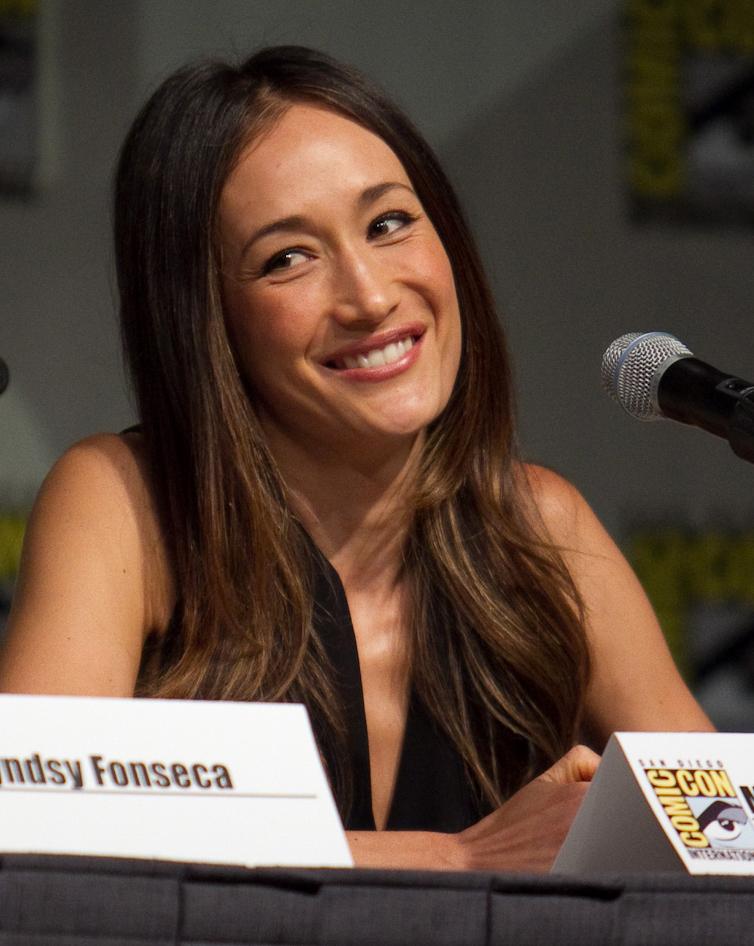
Maggie Q at San Diego Comic-Con.

Portrayed by Maggie Q, Nikita Mears, the show's main protagonist, and titular character was a waif who never knew her parents and went from one foster home to another. She later became a felony addicted teenager sentenced to death row. The secret government agency, Division, recruited her and faked her death to rescue her from death row. Following her rescue, she was trained as a spy and assassin. Her dreams of serving her country well were broken after Division, the only people she thought she could trust, betrayed her. After a three-year hiding period, Nikita now seeks retribution against Division and vowed to bring the agency down. She is Michael's main love interest throughout the series. In the season three premiere, Michael proposes to Nikita and she accepts saying "You had me at giving you the damn Glock." Maggie Q performs her own stunts.

=== Michael Bishop ===
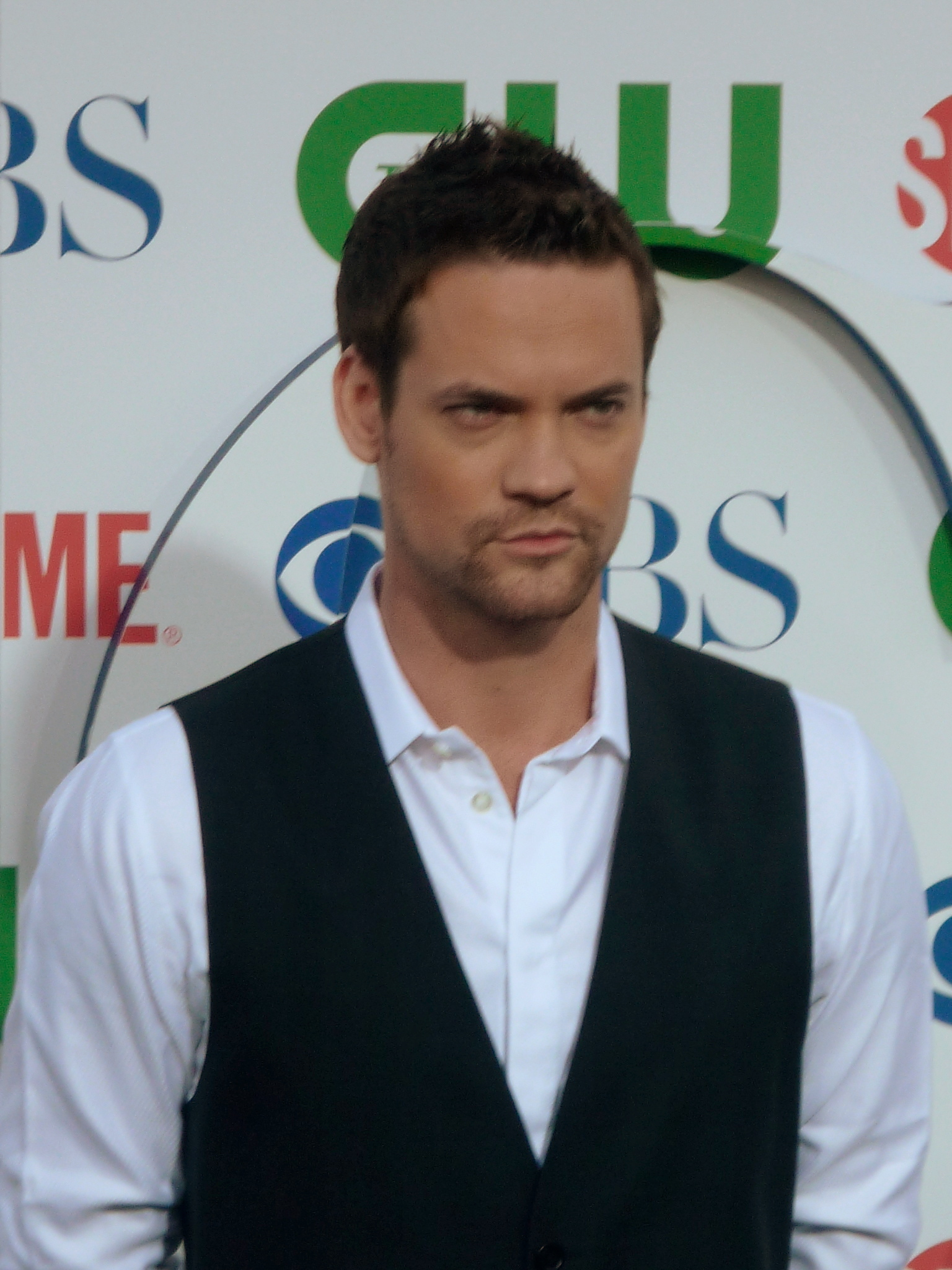
Shane West at 2010 CBS Summer Press Tour Party.

Portrayed by Shane West, Michael is a Division operative who trained Nikita. Michael is second in command at Division surpassed only by the ruthless Percy. He is a former US Navy intelligence officer. Shane West, the actor who plays Michael, described Michael as "confused" and "torn between his loyalty to Division and his own feeling on where he should be going in his life". West also said that "Michael's not inherently a bad guy, at all. He's doing some things that I think he started off believing in, and now he's a little unsure". It is later revealed that Percy, Division's head, hired Kaseem Tariq to kill Michael, but due to an accident, Michael's wife and daughter died. It was this that Percy used to get Michael into Division saying that he could seek retribution. Michael also serves as Nikita's main love interest throughout the series. In season 2 it is revealed that Michael has a son, Max who he was unaware of. Michael proposes to Nikita in the season three premiere after a grueling first mission with the "new" Division. She happily accepts and they kiss passionately.

=== Alexandra Udinov ===
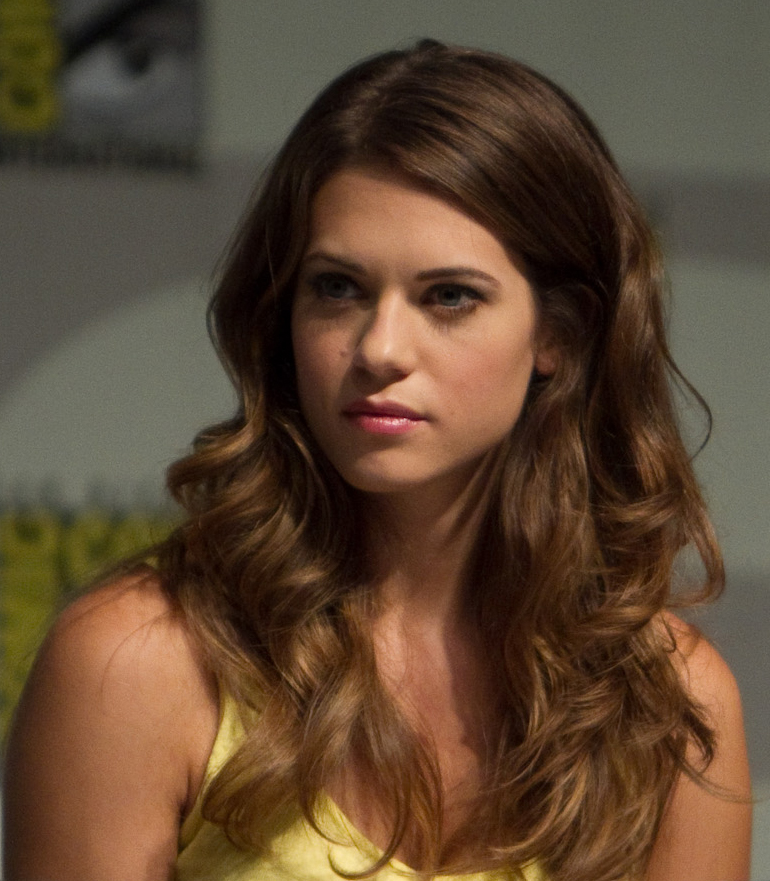
Lyndsy Fonseca at San Diego Comic-Con.

Portrayed by Lyndsy Fonseca, Alexandra "Alex" Udinov is a new recruit in Division. Udinov shares many similarities to Nikita. She is a former street kid who was arrested after a robbery. Udinov, secretly, assists Nikita in her quest to destroy Division by acting as a mole. Alex has post-traumatic stress disorder after she was kidnapped by Russians and sold as a sex slave. In "Alexandra", the 15th episode of the first season, it is revealed that Alex is the daughter of a Russian oligarch, and the heir to his business empire. After accidentally killing Thom, then framing him as Nikita's mole, she graduated to agent. In the 21st episode, Alex's true identity was recovered by Amanda, and Percy re-activated her kill chip as a deal to use her against Nikita. In the Season 1 finale, Alex faked Nikita's death so that Nikita could stop Percy, resulting in her recapture by Division. Amanda, however, permanently deactivated Alex's kill chip and let her escape, persuading her to make her own life without being Nikita's mole. Alex then abandoned Nikita, only to be captured by Oversight, who controls Division, and given an order to find and apprehend Nikita and Michael. In Season 2, Alex becomes a free agent and an independent contractor for Division, working with Amanda to bring down Nikita and Michael in exchange for Division's support in her own mission to bring down Sergei Semak; accepting herself as the Udinov heiress. In the episode "Pale Fire" Alex is shown to be in Russia hunting down Semak. However, Alex discovers that her mother; who she believed was dead is, in fact, alive and is now married to Semak. After Oversight's fall, Alex starts to declare war against Semak in public, and soon she discovers the fact that Amanda is co-working with Ari who has been long-time planning to fight against his boss Semak. After Semak is down and Alex has saved her mother from Gogol, Amanda asked Alex to sign a contract that she was willing to pass Zetrov out to Amanda and Ari, but she refused to give the Zetrov to Amanda and soon turned against Division. In the episode "Dead Drop" Alex and Sean share their first kiss.

=== Seymour Birkhoff / Lionel Peller ===
Portrayed by Aaron Stanford, Seymour Birkhoff (birth name Lionel Peller) is Division's head technician and is later promoted to head engineer. A talented computer genius and hacker, Birkhoff, as a college student, was originally an infamous cybercriminal known as "Shadowwalker", responsible for many infamous digital attacks on the government and its agencies; he was caught after trying to gain access into the security systems at The Pentagon from his college dorm room. While in prison, Percy got Birkhoff released and recruited him to Division. Birkhoff was recruited at around the same time as Nikita. Birkhoff is known for his nonconformist nature; despite his work for Division, he maintains pride in his individual work with computers. Despite his fear of Amanda and Percy, Birkhoff is fairly loyal to Division, although at times protests against his more violent duties. In Season 2, Birkhoff, after rescuing Nikita and Michael from a Division ambush, revealed he had escaped Division like they had after Percy was relieved of command and Amanda put in charge; and Birkhoff feared her wrath if she ever found out Birkhoff was responsible for decrypting Percy's black box master drive so much that he fled altogether. Initially hesitant to get involved with their efforts to undo all of Division's crimes, Birkhoff, after seeing the effects of a Division mental manipulation program turning a woman; Alicia, who he had quickly grown to care about, into a mindless killer, eventually he teamed up with Nikita and Michael to take down Division and Oversight. Seymour's backstory is further explored in the season four episode "Setup." He was born Lionel Peller to father Ronald Peller, a senior NSA computer engineer, and mother Rosemary Peller. He was the third and youngest child in his family (having two older siblings, a brother, and a sister), and was considered an accident by his parents. As a teenager, he involved himself with hackers and phreakers. His father attempted to enroll him in military school, but upon discovering this, Lionel faked his own death under the guise of a drunken boating accident, thereafter changing his name to Seymour Birkhoff. In the episode, he reveals to Nikita and the others that his father has been kidnapped by Amanda and she has been using a double of him to act as her mole within the NSA. Nikita convinces Seymour to reveal his existence to his father later in the episode. Despite the animosity he feels towards his father, Seymour still cares for him and attempts to use the double to discover his father's location to rescue him alive; this goes awry however when Amanda discovers the deception and orders the double to kill Seymour; this forces Nikita to kill the double, leaving the fate of his father in doubt.

=== Helen "Amanda" Collins ===
Portrayed by Melinda Clarke, Amanda is the intelligent and beautiful resident psychologist and a master of mental manipulation; she is the official manipulator (as well as torturer) of Division, under the code-name "Inquisitor". Percy is rumored to have built his entire operation around Amanda's methods and relies on her to get inside people's heads, both during torture and to break them down to believe in Division unconditionally. As an expert manipulator, she can usually tell when people are lying to her and enjoys getting to know the recruits and their secrets. She has a certain fascination for Nikita because she was never able to break her completely. Although she works for Division, she seems to care for some agents and recruits. In Season 2, Amanda has been promoted to Commander of Division and Director of Operations following Percy being relieved of command by Oversight. Amanda, over the course of Season 1, develops a fascination with Alex, similar to Nikita, due to their similar personalities and actions during missions—ultimately resulting in Amanda finding out Alex is Nikita's mole. In Season 2, Amanda and Alex are "business partners". Amanda wants the black box master drive which Nikita and Michael possess and are threatening to expose Division and Oversight with, Alex wants to kill Sergei Semak; who used Oversight to order her family's deaths. Amanda gives Alex information to further this goal, and Alex promises to get the black box master drive. Amanda captured Nikita and introduced her to a story about how she grew up in a hallucination, Nikita thinking she was Amanda but she was really her twin sister. Amanda's real name was Helen. The other twin sister Helen strapped up in a basement being tested and tortured by her own father. (That's probably how Amanda became an Inquisitor because she was tortured before).

In Season 2, it is revealed that Amanda has been promoted to Head of Division, and is holding Percy in an underground cell at Division. However, later on, with Oversight and Division itself hostage, Amanda is forced to release him. At the end of the episode "Clean Sweep," it is revealed that Amanda has been working with Ari Tasarov throughout her time at Division, and was also involved with Ari romantically. They were secretly plotting to take their bosses down and install Alex as head of Zetrov as a puppet, so that Ari may gain the power from her; however, Alex refuses their demands and stops dealing with them.

In "Power", Amanda goes to Moscow with Ari to attempt to offer Gogol the services of Division. While she's gone, Percy manages to reach Division, telling the agents in charge that Amanda is betraying them. Amanda's aide, Sonya, contacts Birkhoff who, unaware of Percy's presence, plays her a video he'd recorded of Amanda offering Gogol the use of Division agents and her calling the agents considered expendable. When Nikita disrupts the plan, Amanda calls for backup only to have Percy answer and let her know she's now being hunted. She and Ari escape to try and plan revenge.

=== Sean Pierce ===
Portrayed by Dillon Casey, Sean Mason Pierce is a Lieutenant Commander in the U.S. Navy and SEAL Team Six operator, with a considerable reputation and record. His mother, Oversight member Senator Madeline Pierce contracts him as an agent at Division, sending him to keep an eye on Amanda. When Sean met Alex, he considered her a traitor and untrustworthy. Later, after seeing her in action, he acts as a mentor to Alex—reminding her to see past her own mission in life to bring down Semak. Due to his background, he has a code of honor and is determined never to leave a man behind, unlike Division—something Alex quickly comes to respect. Sean was originally dedicated to terminating Nikita and her team due to their actions endangering his mother, and to this end began seducing Alex as he was aware she was still connected to the rogue agent. In "Clean Sweep", however, Sean and his mother are saved by Nikita when the rest of Oversight is killed, so they team up with Nikita, Michael, and Alex in the hopes of destroying Division. Sean works with Nikita and the others, and his relationship with Alex gets closer after his mother's death (an event that was completely devastating to him—but he gained some sense of comfort after personally killing the assassin, who worked for Percy). Sean and Alex share their first kiss in "Dead Drop." In the Season 2 finale, Sean and Alex begin a romantic relationship. In Season 3, their relationship becomes strained when Sean sees Alex isn't distancing herself from Division, and her continued service was endangering her life. Sean briefly left her, not wanting to witness another person he loved die due to their connection to Division, and it resulted in Alex going off the rails and relapsing into drug use. Later, however, Sean returns to save her life, realizing how much he needs her, and so the two become sexually active. Amanda targets Sean due to his place as a member of Nikita's team, and so destroys his life—after assassinating CIA Director Morgan Kendrick with a car bomb, Amanda frames Sean for the assassination, making it look like a delusively paranoid Sean killed Kendrick and his Navy therapist as revenge for the CIA's assassination of his mother. Efforts to clear Sean fail, forcing Division to fake his death. Sean was then forced to remain at Division, his sisters believing him dead and the public believing him a murderer and traitor. In "Broken Home", Sean was involved in the mutiny at Division, and after a gunfight, succumbed to internal bleeding and died in Alex's arms.

=== Ryan Fletcher ===
Portrayed by Noah Bean, Ryan Thomas Fletcher is a CIA agent and analyst who is known in the agency as a conspiracy theorist regarding Division. Initially, a junior analyst and case officer, when Owen Elliot releases information detailing the Division's assassination of a Chilean presidential candidate, Ryan reports his suspicions to his superiors. He adds that he has been tracing leads since the Mirko Dadich incident to confirm that a government-sanctioned black-ops unit committed these acts. The deputy director, however, a contact of Percy's, agrees to have Ryan framed by Division for the assassination. He allows Ryan to be captured by Chilean rebels, who attempt to force a confession out of him before his own government frames him. Nikita and Owen rescue him. Ryan is informed of the existence of Division: this knowledge gives him leverage so that Division will not kill him. He becomes Nikita's ally, agreeing to help track down the group of officials who sanction Division, and discreetly allows them to escape CIA custody from a plane en route to the United States. On his return, Division frames the deputy director as the instigator of Ryan's frame-up and has him killed, clearing Ryan. Later, at Nikita's request, Ryan renditions Birkhoff and brings him to his CIA office for interrogation. Once Division finds out, the CIA is contacted and Ryan is demoted to monitoring Cold War stations. Ryan, who at this time is romantically attracted to Nikita, feels betrayed when they capture Birkhoff and realizes that revenge is more important to her than his career. Later, by way of apology, Nikita kisses him and promises to "make him a hero". He is placed in a different department after "uncovering" information through Nikita, and she gives him information on Birkhoff and Michael. When Ryan later gets intelligence on Emile Voss's dirty bomb, with Nikita's help, they dispel the threat and Ryan personally delivers the weapon to his superiors. He is promoted to clandestine operations, giving him more access. Ryan ultimately has to sacrifice his career: he can get Nikita out of CIA custody after she has saved the CIA from being taken over by Division's coup, and Ryan is arrested for again allowing her to escape. But even in prison, he continues to gather clues about how Oversight is funded. In the episode Clawback, Amanda fakes Ryan so that he can help her take down the Oversight. Nikita and his own mother believe that Ryan is dead. After Percy goes rogue and escapes Division and his cage prison, Ryan becomes the replacement prisoner in the cage. Later, Amanda informs Nikita that Ryan is still alive and tells her to recapture Percy—her price for Ryan's release. On his release, Ryan goes off on his own for a while to gather information for the team and to establish a place for himself to live. He later returns and provides support for the team while they track Percy's developing nuclear program; Ryan serves as the team's intelligence analyst. In the Season 2 finale, Ryan is Nikita's anti-Division team's contact with the US government, liaising with the President himself on how to attack Division safely and in time to stop Percy's plans with his new satellite weapon. After Percy's death, and a peaceful negotiation between the government and Division, Ryan is commended by the President and Vice President. He is to be put in charge of the organization itself, as the new Head of Division. Working alongside Nikita, they would undo Percy's damage, and reform it to combat threats to the country and give second chances to its members, as had been originally intended.

During Season 4, Fletcher's dogged insistence that another group is pulling strings compels Ryan (in Episode 5: Bubble) to question Jones, a member of the group behind MDK. He is subsequently captured and eventually commits suicide by throwing himself out a window, knowing his death will force Nikita to realize that her crusade to stop MDK, and Amanda, is not yet over.

=== Owen Elliot / Sam Matthews ===
Portrayed by Devon Sawa, Owen is a former Division "cleaner" operative who resides in Montreal, Canada as a Guardian- one of the specially chosen few trusted to handle one of Percy's black boxes. Owen, like Nikita, worked for Division and fell in love with a civilian named Emily Robinson (division operatives are forbidden from falling in love). When the black box location is exposed and Owen requests relocation, Percy agrees and personally comes to Montreal with a large team, secretly intending to kill Owen after retrieving the box. When Division agents come after him, Emily is shot and killed by a Division sniper. Owen then turns against Division to avenge her death and joins Nikita on her mission to find and destroy the other Division black boxes and kill Percy. Owen later realizes that he was the "cleaner" who killed Daniel Monroe, Nikita's civilian fiancé- a fact he reveals and he later apologizes for; Owen is emotionally weighed down by the number of victims he has taken during his time in service to Division. Owen continues working with Nikita through Season 2 when he disappears again to hunt down and kill the remaining Guardians and destroy their boxes. Owen, without Nikita's knowledge, goes so far as to ally with Gogol under Ari Tasarov's command, agreeing to destroy the black boxes in exchange for Gogol's financing and support for his activities. Owen resurfaces in the episode Guardians where he had tracked down the latest guardian Patrick Miller and planned to raid his home with a Gogol team, but the guardian had left before he could capture him. Having got word of his alliance with Gogol Nikita sneaks into his home and sneaks up on him and attacks him and confronts him in an enraged state. After he calmed her down she spends the night and in the morning he cooks her breakfast and they have a heart-to-heart. They go investigating the Guardian, but in the middle of it all they discuss Nikita's love life and she reveals her relationship troubles with Michael to him and he consoles her. He later returns to Gogol only to have them turn on him and he calls Nikita to go confront the Guardian on her own because she would get to him before Gogol having that he himself is currently already incapacitated. He and Nikita are later saved by Michael during a fight. Since there were two tasks at hand in two different locations going to get the black box in the possession of Gogol and defeating the Guardians and destroying their black boxes Nikita told Owen and Michael to team up to go defeat the Guardians while she heads to Gogol believing that it would be easier for them to handle the Guardians if it was the two of them together. In the episode Pale Fire Having partnered up both him and Michael together they were able to find, defeat, and kill a Guardian and find the rest of the guardians and destroy all their black boxes. After the mission was done they gather with Alex and Nikita at the beach house and he tells them he was going to go off by himself once again. Somewhere in the next six months, Owen was caught and imprisoned in Russia. Another Cleaner helped him escape, although she did this on Amanda's orders, who needed information from Owen. Nikita and Division were alerted about his escape and helped him get back to Division. He was shocked to learn that Percy was dead, and Nikita was now running Division with Ryan. However, after learning that Amanda knew who he was before Division captured him and turned him into an agent. He is now a part of Nikita's team.

In the third-season episode, "Masks," Owen is attacked by Amanda who paralyzes him and causes him to remember his true identity as Sam Matthews, a former Delta Force member. He gets Nikita to help him look up a former comrade only to kill the man in cold blood and capture Nikita. He reveals that Sam was a corrupt soldier who was running a heroin smuggling operation but was betrayed by his fellow members who shot him, leaving him for dead. Nikita can't believe Owen could be this way but he turns her over to Amanda, killing the woman's bodyguards in the process with a sociopathic attitude.

=== Percival "Percy" Rose ===
Played by Xander Berkeley, Percy Rose is the Head of Division (through Season 1, and the latter part of Season 2). He will stop at nothing to destroy Nikita and protect his empire. As witnessed by his co-workers, Percy is ruthless, capable of doing anything to achieve what he wants. He has a fair set of skills, including using firearms and self-defense tactics. He is often sardonic and sarcastic, having a notable dark sense of humor. His ambition to eliminate Nikita often drives him into failure, but not before anticipating her every move. In Season 2, Percy has been relieved of command and deposed as head of Division after attempting to overtake Oversight—he now resides in a Division jail, miles underground. Amanda, promoted to take Percy's place, makes it clear Percy is only alive as Amanda needs him that way; if he dies, the content of the remaining three black boxes will be published, plunging the world into chaos. In "Clean Sweep" Percy threatens to release a gas that will kill of all division if Amanda does not agree to let him go. Amanda reluctantly agrees to give Percy his freedom but in exchange, she vows that if he ever returns to division she will have him shot dead. At the end of the episode, we see Percy is seen talking to Roan and it is hinted that he has a plan to ruin Division. In the season two finale, Percy's death comes as he falls trying to kill Nikita.

=== Thom ===
Portrayed by Ashton Holmes, Thom is a Division assassin and Alex's love interest. Thom arrived at Division two years after Nikita and a year before Alex. Originally one of the recruits who were on the brink of becoming full agents, Thom had an unwavering determination to prove himself to Division; as a recruit team leader, Thom took care of the recruits who were struggling with Division's training programs, and when Alex was a recruit, helped her out when he could. Thom also defended her against Jaden, with who he had a short relationship, and developed feelings for Alex, kissing her at one point, although Alex didn't know how to react and rejected him. In Season 1, Episode 8; Thom graduated and became a full-fledged agent after killing a Gogol asset; an act that was hard for him to bear. Thom later discovered that Alex was working together with Nikita, and tried to take Alex in at gunpoint, but the two fought and Thom is accidentally shot and killed by Alex with his own gun. A heartbroken Alex, who later admits she loved Thom in the end, swears revenge on Division for the situation that resulted in Thom's death, seeing him as one more victim of Division. Posthumously, Alex framed Thom as the mole and he took the fall for Nikita's infiltration. In the Season 1 finale, Alex is exposed as the true mole, a fact everyone knows by the Season 2 premiere, clearing Thom's name.

=== Jaden ===
Portrayed by Tiffany Hines, Jaden is a Division assassin who regularly clashed with Alex. Jaden arrived at Division two months before Alex, having been recruited after murdering her boyfriend while he slept, an action Percy admiringly describes as "taking initiative". Jaden embraced her new life at Division and had a brief romance with Thom. Although having similar backgrounds as former street kids, she became resentful of Alex, feeling the latest addition was stealing her thunder. Thom's interest in Alex didn't help matters due to the previous relationship she shared with him. Alex and Jaden's rivalry reaches dangerous levels when they brawl and are reprimanded by Michael. Afterward, under threat of "cancellation" (death), if they continued their fights, Jaden maintained an outward cordiality towards Alex, but despite this, Jaden clearly didn't trust Alex and almost found out Alex's secret: that she is Nikita's mole. Alex was able to keep Jaden in line by deciding to frame Jaden for trying to escape Division, acquiring a picture as evidence to blackmail her. After Thom is killed by Alex for working with Nikita, Jaden clearly believed that Alex framed Thom, set him up as the mole, and then killed him. Later, Jaden was appointed a provisional agent and worked together under Alex on an operation that led to her graduation and appointment as a full-fledged agent, the events of the mission finally cooled relations between them. Shortly after, however, Jaden fought Alex for a final time when she stopped her from reporting Nathan Colville (Alex's boyfriend who had just learned of Division) to Division to have him killed, and during the fight, when Jaden is about to kill Alex, Nathan stepped in and shot Jaden in the stomach, which instantly killed her. After her death, Roan comes to the scene and takes Jaden's body, and proceeds to dissolve her body in a tub of hydrofluoric acid. In the debrief with Amanda afterward, Amanda revealed she had placed a new undetectable earpiece on Jaden without her knowledge; when Alex called Nikita for assistance, mere meters away from Jaden's dead body, Amanda heard and recorded Alex doing it—exposing her as the mole.

== Recurring characters ==
=== Roan ===
Portrayed by Rob Stewart, Roan is the most notable assassin and "cleaner" operative in Division. He often works as Percy's right-hand man and never questions his orders. Roan is noted to almost never speak, save for a few terse and literal comments towards others; he is a proficient and calm killer. In the Season 1 finale, Roan tries to "clean" Nikita's seemingly dead body, when she wakes up and splashed hydrofluoric acid meant for her in his face, leaving him scarred. In Season 2, despite Percy being relieved of command and Amanda's promotion, Roan still works under Amanda's command, and becomes Alex's partner in one mission (where Roan actually became impressed with Alex, according to Amanda in the debrief). Though half of his face is burned now, he has the same deadly skills as before. In "Clean Sweep" it is revealed that Roan is Percy's mole—although Percy is imprisoned, Roan remains loyal to him, and proceeds to coordinate the remaining black box Guardians' movements; and arranges an attack on Oversight with them, helping Percy escape. After being exposed as the mole, Roan leaves Division and joins Percy on the outside as a rogue agent. He later returns to Division after Percy retakes control of Division from Amanda. Roan works to build Percy's nuclear program, and take control of a satellite weapon for Percy's use. In the Season 2 finale, Roan, after receiving a signal telling him Percy is dead (where he looks momentarily somber; taking off his signature glasses as a simple sign of respect), moved to release plutonium in a public area in the U.S. Before he could, he battled Sean and Alex, and, by accident, electro-shocked himself to death.

=== Ari Tasarov ===
Portrayed by Peter Outerbridge, Ari Tasarov is the leader of the Russian criminal organization Gogol, which seeks to rival and topple Division, and serves as the shadow arm of Sergei Semak. Nikita comes close to assassinating him, but refrains upon seeing Tasarov with his son. He is former KGB and currently serves as Chief of Intelligence (and later Security) of Zetrov. He is cold-hearted, calculating and always attempts to outdo Division operations. Nikita and Tasarov first cross paths during his operation to assassinate U.S. Senator Jack Kerrigan, one of Percy's few trusted government allies; Nikita not only outsmarts Tasarov and foils the assassination attempt, but also ruins Kerrigan's career, rendering him useless to Percy. Satisfied with the result, Tasarov meets with Nikita, offering to work with her to take down Division, also revealing his knowledge of the black boxes. Tasarov and Nikita meet again when Gogol goes after Emile Voss and the dirty bomb he developed; Nikita interferes and they fail to acquire the bomb, which is delivered to Ryan Fletcher. Nikita later comes to Tasarov to ask for his help in getting to Kasim Tariq, the al-Qaeda leader whom Gogol is in partnership with. Tasarov agrees but warns her about striking back at Gogol a third time. After Nikita hits a convoy full of heroin, Kasim goes to St. Petersburg to confront Tasarov about the identity of the "Knights of Shi'ra". Tasarov simply bluffs his way through before Nikita doublecrosses him again, and captures and kills Kasim.

In Season 2, Ari Tasarov creates an alliance with Owen Elliot, a former Division Guardian and associate of Nikita; Tasarov and Owen collaborate to find the remaining black boxes using funding from Gogol. When he questions Owen about Nikita's supposed possession of the black box, Owen denies it and warns Ari that if he moves against Nikita, he will kill him. Owen's threat, however, confirms Tasarov's suspicions, who begins his own efforts to locate Nikita and retrieve the drive; he begins by recruiting Kelly, a disavowed Division agent and Nikita's old Division partner, to infiltrate Nikita's operation and retrieve the box. Under pressure from Sergei Semak, Tasarov ultimately finds out Alex is Anton Kochenko's assassin and the missing Zetrov heiress; Semak realizes she is plotting to retake her father's empire, and insists that she be killed. Ari grows impatient and threatens Owen when he cannot find the black box, doubting his ability to deliver on their business arrangement. Owen then turns to Nikita for help in finding the black box, secretly using Ari's resources. Eventually, however, Ari discovers Owen's true alliance and has him captured. Ari finally retrieves the black box and escapes to Semak's mansion after intercepting a police convoy that holds both Nikita and the black box. In the end of "Clean Sweep" it is revealed that Ari and Amanda have been working together. Ari murders Semak as he plans to take Zetrov for himself. Eventually, in order to retake Zetrov under the name of her family, Alex convinces the company's board of directors that Ari is not reliable, and the chairman of the Board of Zetrov fires Ari from the company and Gogol. Ari is forced to go on the run with Amanda. He is last seen with Amanda in a hotel room, although he has been able to acquire one of Percy's black boxes.

=== Nathan Colville ===
Portrayed by Thad Luckinbill, Nathan is Alex's neighbour in their apartment building and love interest following Alex's graduation and Thom's death. Nathan, unaware of Alex's true life and current tenure as a secret government operative, quickly grew interested in her, and soon their relationship took a romantic turn—something Nikita warned Alex that Division would know if she proceeds. Regardless, Alex and Nathan begin a sexual relationship, though Alex, mindful of Nikita's words, feared for his safety. Alex decided to reveal the truth, but her initial attempts to explain left him assuming Alex was indebted to the Mob, until Alex finally explained she wanted to protect him from government assassins. Nathan somewhat didn't believe her and left. He later returned to Alex, just as Jaden was visiting. He sarcastically commented that she must be another government assassin before walking out the door. When Alex and Jaden get into a fight about this, and Jaden is about to kill Alex, Nathan steps in and shot Jaden in the stomach, which instantly kills her. Alex instructs Nathan to immediately pack up and leave as soon as possible, Nathan then fled to hide from Division. Nathan does not return.

=== Sergei Semak ===
Portrayed by Peter J. Lucas, Sergei Semak is the current CEO of Zetrov and head of Gogol, following the death of Nikolai Udinov. Semak, originally Udinov's right-hand man, approached Oversight to have Division target and kill the Udinov family so Semak could take over Zetrov and maintain better relations with the U.S. Under his tenure, Semak expanded Zetrov's operations, influence and corporate reach across the world, making the company a global empire and making him one of its most powerful men, further when he created Gogol to protect Zetrov interests. In Season 2, when Anton Kochenko, a top-level Zetrov executive and the company's spokesperson, is killed, Semak personally becomes involved in the fallout and presses for results and the identity of the assassin from Ari Tasarov; who he "promotes" to take over his security (following Semak's execution of his predecessor for insubordination). Upon finding out the assassin was Alex; who is the rightful head of Zetrov, Semak immediately orders Tasarov to put together a secret team of agents to locate and kill her—Semak, fearing Alex's return would result in his losing control of Zetrov, makes it clear Tasarov's orders are no longer to capture Alex, but to shoot her on sight. Later it is revealed Semak had Katya Udinov, Nikolai's widow, spared from the original attack on the Udinov estate, as part of his deal with Percy—the two had been in an affair before Nikolai's death, and the two secretly married in the years after the attack. Semak was later forced to publicly acknowledge Alex and openly fight with her for leadership of Zetrov. It is at this time he is betrayed, shot and killed by Ari, as part of his own plan to take over the company himself.

=== Madeline Pierce ===
Portrayed by Alberta Watson, who also played the same character named Madeline in the former La Femme Nikita series. Madeline is a US Senator and used to be a member of Oversight (until the group was completely taken down in "Clean Sweep"). She is the mother of Sean Pierce, who is very loyal to her and does whatever it takes to protect her. In "Sanctuary" Madeline along with her colleagues was captured as hostages by Guardians. The rest of Oversight members were killed according to Percy's order, but Sean and Nikita managed to save her. At the end of the episode Madeline, Sean, Nikita and Michael teamed up for destroying Division. She was later killed in the episode "Wrath" by a car bomb set by Nicholas Brandt, an old foe of Nikita.

=== Sonya ===
Portrayed by Lyndie Greenwood, Sonya is the British head technician at Division, and Birkhoff's replacement, as well as serving as Amanda's aide. Sonya was later developed as a love interest for Birkhoff. When Birkhoff returned to Division in the Season 2 finale, Sonya and Birkhoff met to commence repairs of the damaged systems, and despite rules of fraternization between Division agents, Birkhoff kissed her in front of the entire operations floor. It was recently revealed that she's from East Africa most likely from a former British colony. Sonya was a kind person to people. She was captured by Ann a rogue Division Cleaner. Being bugged by Amanda and activating her kill chip. Sonya was the new mole in the New Division. Birkhoff finds out she was the mole and almost killed her. But Sonya convinces Birkhoff why she was the mole. There was another mole in New Division watching Sonya's Every Movement. Turn out the second mole was Baker. Sonya wants to be a normal citizen
