= Rob Stewart (actor) =

Canadian actor (born 1961)

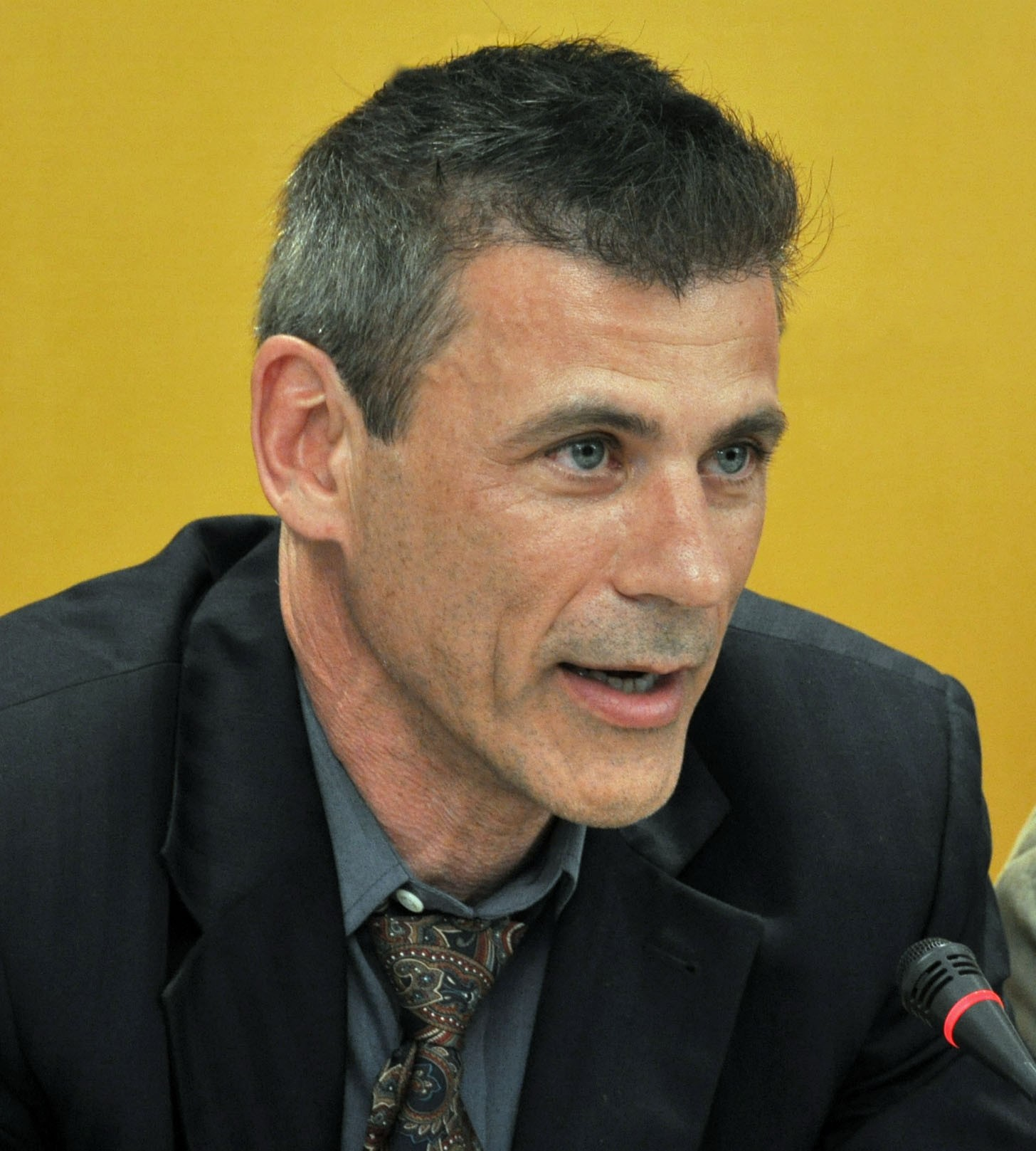
- Stewart in Belgrade on 3 June 2009
- Born: Robert Thomas Stewart; 23 July 1961 (age 65); Toronto, Ontario, Canada
- Years active: 1986–present
- Spouse: Celiana Stewart
- Children: 1

Robert Thomas Stewart (born 23 July 1961) is a Canadian actor, known for the lead role of Nick Slaughter in the action-comedy television series Tropical Heat, and his recurring roles as Roan in Nikita and Khlyen in Killjoys.

== Early life ==
Stewart was born in Toronto, Ontario, Canada, He was raised in Bramalea, a neighbourhood in Brampton, Ontario. He enjoyed playing hockey and dreamt of becoming a professional. At the age of 17, he sustained an injury that caused him to lose a kidney and subsequently turn down a number of athletic scholarships that had been offered to him.

He enrolled at the University of Waterloo where he majored in Latin and English.

== Career ==
In order to put himself through university, he sang and played the guitar at local restaurants. In the summers, he performed stunts and acrobatics at Canada's Wonderland amusement park.

Throughout his career he has guest-starred in numerous television roles. One of his early notable roles was Nick Slaughter on Tropical Heat. Stewart was one of the leads in the television show Peter Benchley's Amazon. In 2007 he began playing the male lead in Painkiller Jane that ran for 22 episodes on the Sci Fi Channel.

Stewart played a major recurring character, Roan, in the CW hit action television series Nikita for its first two seasons. Towards the end of his run on Nikita he also had a minor role of an alcoholic movie producer over a few episodes of the Canadian series The L.A. Complex that depicts the lives of young Canadian actors struggling for work in Los Angeles. This was followed by an appearance in two episodes of the long-running CBC Television series Heartland.

Airing on the CW, he appeared in six episodes of Beauty & the Beast as the character Mr. Chandler. Soon after, Stewart appeared in an episode of the Syfy television series Defiance which was shot in his hometown Toronto, followed by another one-episode role – this time on the Canadian series Cracked.

In 2013, the documentary Slaughter Nick for President was released. The film follows Stewart on his 2009 trip to Serbia, where Tropical Heat achieved notable popularity in the 1990s. The same year, he was cast in Suits as corporate raider Tony Gionopoulos, appearing in five episodes.

From 2015 to 2019, Stewart played Khlyen, a significant recurring character in Killjoys.

== Personal life ==
Stewart met his wife Celiana Stewart during the first season of Tropical Heat. He has one son. Since 2001, he has resided in Canada.

== Select filmography ==
=== Film ===
Year	Title	Role	Notes
1995	Someone to Die For	Sergeant Hollman	
1996	Kounterfeit	Vic	Direct-to-video film
1997	An American Affair	Dave Norton	
1997	Motel Blue	Agent Daniel Larimer	
1998	The Pawn	Darcy Harlan	
2001	Criss Cross	Nick Slaughter	Film sequel to Tropical Heat
2005	Devour	Ross North	Direct-to-video film
2013	Molly Maxwell	Evan Maxwell	
2019	Goliath	Sheriff	
2020	Sugar Daddy	Bill	
2022	A Grand Romantic Gesture	Matthew	

=== Television ===
Year	Title	Role	Notes
1986	Hot Shots	Peter	Episode: "The Family Jules"
1986	Alfred Hitchcock Presents	Bradley	Episode: "Ancient Voices"
1989	Come Spy With Me	N/A	Unsold television pilot
1991–1993	Tropical Heat	Nick Slaughter	Main role; known as Sweating Bullets in United States
1994	Broken Lullaby	Nick Rostov	Television film (CBS)
1994	Highlander: The Series	Axel	Episode: "Rite of Passage"
1995	A Dream Is a Wish Your Heart Makes: The Annette Funicello Story	Jack Gilardi	Television film (CBS)
1996	The Adventures of Sinbad	Vincenzo	Episode: "Still Life"; as Robert Stewart
1997	High Incident	Keeler	3 episodes
1997	Operation Delta Force	Sparks	Television film
1997	Annie O	Coach Will Cody	Television film; as Robert Stewart
1997	The Christmas List	Dr. David Skyler	Television film (Fox Family Channel)
1997	Sweet Deception	Detective Molloy	Television film
1999	Two of Hearts	Jake Michaelson	Television film
1999–2000	Peter Benchley's Amazon	Andrew Talbott	Main role
2001	Nash Bridges	Dr. Kent McCall	Episode: "Quack Fever"; as Robert Thomas Stewart
2003	Tom Stone	Dean Moncrieffe	Episode: "La Sonnambula"; note: unaired season 2 episode
2003	Jake 2.0	Miles Jennings	Episode: "The Spy Who Really Liked Me"
2004	5ive Days to Midnight	Dr. Dan Westville	Miniseries
2004	The Collector	Russell McKinney	Episode: "The Medium"
2004	Show Me Yours	Dr. Adrian Goldman	Episodes: "The F-Word", "Pandora's Box"
2005	G-Spot	Dr. Earl Stoffard	Episodes: "Stalker", "Sexual Dysfunctions Anonymous"
2005	1-800-Missing	Jim Michaelson	Episode: "Patient X"
2006	Home by Christmas	Michael	Television film (Lifetime)
2007	Demons from Her Past	K.C. Hollings	Television film
2007	Painkiller Jane	Andre McBride	Main role
2008	ReGenesis	Dr. Martin Cove	Episodes: "Hep Burn and Melinkov", "The Kiss"
2008	The Memory Keeper's Daughter	Howard	Television film (Lifetime)
2008	The Summit	Colonel Chadsworth	Miniseries
2009	Dear Prudence	Doug Craig	Television film (Hallmark)
2009	The Good Witch's Garden	Nick Chasen	Television film (Hallmark)
2009	Throwing Stones	Jim Campbell	Television film (CBC)
2009	Being Erica	Norm	Episode: "The Unkindest Cut"
2009–2011	Majority Rules!	Gary Richards	Recurring role, 9 episodes
2010	Republic of Doyle	Victor Beerman / Turk	Episode: "The Return of the Grievous Angel"
2010	Little Mosque on the Prairie	Robert	Episode: "Radio Silence"
2010	The Bridge	Travers	Episode: "The Unguarded Moment"
2010	Lost Girl	Lyle Harrison	Episode: "Faetal Justice"
2010–2012	Nikita	Roan	Recurring role (seasons 1–2), 23 episodes
2011	XIII: The Series	Reg	Episode: "Training Camp"
2011	Flashpoint	Cunningham	Episode: "Run, Jamie, Run"
2011	Metal Tornado	Dennis Porter	Television film (Syfy)
2011	Combat Hospital	Major Kenneth Winacott	Episode: "Reason to Believe"
2011	John A.: Birth of a Country	William McDougall	Television film (CBC)
2012	My Mother's Secret	Jonas Wells	Television film
2012	The L.A. Complex	Roan	4 episodes
2012	Heartland	Lanny Barick	Episodes: "Keeping Up Appearances", "Life Is a Highway"
2012–2013	Beauty & the Beast	Mr. Chandler	Recurring role (season 1), 6 episodes
2013	Defiance	Eddie Braddock	Episode: "Brothers in Arms"
2013	Cracked	Reuben Froese	Episode: "Swans"
2013–2015	Suits	Tony Gionopoulos	Recurring role (seasons 3–5), 5 episodes
2014	Working the Engels	Anthony	Episode: "Jenna's Presentation"
2014	Guilty at 17	Gilbert Adkins	Television film (Lifetime)
2015	Reign	Envoy Lord / Burgess	Episodes: "Tasting Revenge", "Tempting Fate"
2015	Killer Crush	Cameron York	Television film (Lifetime)
2015	Lead With Your Heart	Thomas Hardison	Television film (Hallmark)
2015	Dark Matter	Nassan	Episodes: "Episode One", "Episode Two"
2015–2019	Killjoys	Khlyen Kin Rit	Recurring role, 21 episodes
2016	Slasher	Alan Henry	Recurring role (season 1), 6 episodes
2016	Incorporated	Spiga Board Member	Recurring role, 6 episodes
2018	Schitt's Creek	Rene	Episode: "Baby Sprinkle"
2019	The Hot Zone	General Dwyer	Miniseries
2019	Designated Survivor	Garrett Detwiler	4 episodes (season 3)
2021	Zoey's Extraordinary Playlist	Roger	3 episodes (season 2)
2021	The Great Christmas Switch	James Sabia	Television film
2021–2022	Mayor of Kingstown	Captain Richard Heard	3 episodes
2022	Fallen Angels Murder Club: Friends to Die For	Jeffery Wallace	Television film (Lifetime)
2022	Fallen Angels Murder Club: Heroes and Felons	Jeffery Wallace	Television film (Lifetime)
2023	'Twas the Text Before Christmas	Bruce	Television film
2024	The Way Home	Sam Bishop	Television series (Hallmark), Recurring role
