= Michael (Nikita character) =

Michael Bishop
- Nikita character
- First appearance: "Pilot"
- Last appearance: "Canceled"
- Created by: Craig Silverstein
- Portrayed by: Shane West

In-universe information
- Alias: Daniel Pope; Mike Royce; Jonathan
- Nickname: Mikey
- Gender: Male
- Occupation: Mercenary
- Spouse: Elizabeth (wife; deceased); Nikita (wife)
- Children: Hayley (daughter, with Elizabeth; deceased); Max Ovechkin (son, with Cassandra Ovechkin)
- Nationality: American

Michael Bishop is a fictional character of the CW television series Nikita, portrayed by Shane West. He is the primary romantic interest to Nikita.

== History ==
Little is actually known about his past; but flashbacks show Michael was originally a U.S. Navy intelligence officer (although Season 1 episode "Covenant" depicts him in Marine uniform), working primarily in the United Arab Emirates. He was also a dedicated family man; with a wife, Elizabeth, and young daughter, Hayley.

In 2001, while in Yemen, Iraq; Michael was running a "low-level snitch"; Kasim Tariq, who was feeding Michael information from inside Al-Qaeda, and was on friendly terms with him. Kasim attempted to kill him with a car bomb placed in a briefcase, supposedly filled with stolen documents, that was in Michael's car. Instead, Michael stepped outside, leaving the briefcase in the car with his family, and realized too late Kasim had betrayed him – the bomb detonated and the car exploded; instantly killing Elizabeth and Hayley, but Michael, unharmed, was knocked out by the blast.

No sooner had he regained consciousness after the incident, Michael, recovering in a hospital bed and emotionally destroyed by the loss of his family, immediately attempted suicide with pain medication – Percy Rose, however, enters and recruited him into Division; hoping Division will assist him in locating Kasim and Michael would get an opportunity to get revenge. Michael accepted and was given the position as second-in-command and head of agent operations at Division; this cemented the relationship between Percy and Michael. Michael almost achieved this in "One Way", Michael plans to stab Tariq with a shiv in a public airport after assistance from Nikita, unbeknownst to her. Nikita foils this plan to save his own life.

In 2011, Michael finally joined Nikita and her cause after finding out the true reasons behind the death of his family – Kasim only posed as a snitch, and was truly an NOC Division agent; the death of his family was actually due to Percy, the man who saved his life, who had persuaded Kasim that Michael would be an ideal target to gain the approval from Al-Qaeda. Kasim was then killed by Nikita. Upon learning this, Michael, his faith in everything except his feelings for Nikita shattered, joins Nikita's growing anti-Division team – they also succumb to their feelings and become lovers. Together, he continues with them on her mission to search of a way to bring down Division.

== Character storylines ==
At the start of the story arc concerning Tariq, Michael originally believes that they were killed by Tariq so that he could enter Al Qaeda, having been told so by Percy. Percy and Michael met as Michael was trying to commit suicide, by an overdose of morphine, but is stopped by Percy, who instead persuades him to join him at Division. Michael then agrees, and takes up the position of a high-ranking agent due to his military training. He receives the job of greeting new recruits, processing them when they are first taken out of prison. He meets both Nikita and Alex this way. Michael discovers that the death of his family was actually due to the man who saved his life (Percy), who persuaded Tariq that Michael would be an ideal target to gain the approval from Al-Qaeda. Upon learning this, Michael joins Nikita in her search for Percy's secret-containing black boxes.

== Relationships and personality ==
"It seems like he felt human with her, but robotic with everyone else."

— Shane West in an interview for KSiteTV

Michael is introverted in his relationships and is shown to have a closer circle of associates than the other agents. He is, however, shown to be friends with the likes of Seymour Birkhoff and Alex.

Concerning his relationship with Nikita, he seems to not completely understand her intentions (both past and present) when they work together. It is ambiguous to Michael as to why Nikita acted the way she did in saving him from being killed by Kasim Tariq's bodyguards. In the episode "Alexandra", he questions her about it, claiming that had she never acted he could have gained revenge and expresses anger that she did so, to which Nikita retaliates with, "What I did I did out of..." before trailing off (the implication being that she was going to say she did it out of love). Then, when Michael looks at her oddly, she finishes, "not wanting to see you get hurt." In the episode "Covenants", Michael leaves Division and joins Nikita. The two have since become romantically involved. In episode "Looking Glass", it is learned that Michael fathered a son with Cassandra (played by Helena Mattsson).

Michael was also in charge of processing new recruits, and telling them that they have been taken out of prison and been given a new life by Division. He breaks the news to Alex in the first episode, telling her that the public now will believe her to have committed suicide in prison. As a field agent, he played a similar role to that of Amanda, who were both high-ranking yet with some psychological leanings in their positions. It is also heavily implied that everyone, even Amanda and Percy, in Division know of Michael's implied affair with Nikita. Both Amanda and Percy have mentioned this to him, Percy rather more bluntly and Amanda stating that "Percy doesn't need to know everything that goes on here."

He also has a platonic relationship with Alex, who is first processed into Division by Michael in the pilot episode, and he instructs her on the training she will receive, thus learning how to properly "serve her country". This reflects six years prior, when he instructed Nikita of the same duties. Alex's similarity to Nikita leads Michael to be more protective of her. He later finds out that she is Nikita's mole by matching the sounds of her phone calls to him to the echoes produced by Nikita's apartment. This is how he is able to track Nikita down. Alex, Nikita and Michael work together to track down Percy's black boxes for a very brief length of time towards the end of the first season, Nikita often in this time asking Michael to help Alex out of sticky situations at Divisions that may compromise his cover by doing so.

== Reception ==
As was the character of Nikita as portrayed by Maggie Q, the character of Michael was highly anticipated by fans who had previously watched La Femme Nikita. Part of this anticipation balanced on the idea of Michael and Nikita's romantic relationship (as had been portrayed in most former incarnations of the tale) and if West and Q possessed a good enough chemistry to play the two.

The character was well received by critics in his own right, yet not as well received by fans of Roy Dupuis' Michael in La Femme Nikita. West stated that, concerning Dupuis, he "always actually liked his work" as well as having also been a fan of the original USA Network La Femme Nikita television series. Regardless of this, the character was generally well received, and West was even more praised for his performance as the first season continued.
