= Alex Udinov =

- Nikita character
- Lyndsy Fonseca as Alexandra Udinov
- First appearance: "Pilot"
- Last appearance: "Cancelled"
- Created by: Craig Silverstein
- Portrayed by: Lyndsy Fonseca; Eliana Jones (flashbacks)

In-universe information
- Full name: Alexandra Udinov
- Alias: Alexandra Jones; Jillian McMillan; Diane Lange; Alex Winslow; Sasha
- Nickname: Alex; Ms Udinov; Little Miss Udinov; Little Alex; Little Nikita
- Gender: Female
- Occupation: Mercenary
- Family: Nikolai Udinov (father; deceased); Katya Udinov (mother); Sergei Semak (stepfather; deceased)
- Significant other: Owen Elliot/Sam Matthews (love interest); Ronnie (deceased); Thom (deceased); Nathan Colville (ex-boyfriend); Sean Pierce (deceased)
- Nationality: Russian

Alexandra "Alex" Udinov is a fictional character on the American television series Nikita, portrayed by Lyndsy Fonseca.

== Character arc ==
=== Background ===
Alex is the daughter of the late Russian oligarch Nikolai Udinov and his wife, who were murdered by the Division on orders of Sergei Semak when Alex was a child. Udinov owned the billion-dollar company Zetrov, of which Alex was the sole heir. Nikita saves Alex and kills her father, and she watches the rest of her family perish in a fire. Nikita cannot protect Alex from anything else as she has to return to the Division, and she gives Alex to one of Udinov's associates for safe-keeping. Instead, Alex is sold into sex slavery by her father's associate since he needed money and thought no one would recognize her if he did.

To keep her from fighting against them, the slavers keep Alex intoxicated and force her to become a drug addict. She escapes the slavers, though she remains a user. Alex brings this part of her past up to Amanda, saying that the slavers "had the decency to keep [her] high" as they held her captive, comparing it to Division.

After Nikita escapes Division, she finds Alex again and rescues her before she is about to get raped and forces her to get clean. After Nikita helps Alex get past the worst part of her withdrawal, she starts to train her both mentally and physically to stay one step ahead of Division once she is inserted there. Nikita makes it clear to Alex that once she gets in, she will be on her own and Nikita will not be able to help her if something goes wrong.

Alex suffers panic attacks when certain things trigger suppressed memories from her past, such as being under a car. Alex also has nightmares about her deceased family, often speaking Russian and screaming for her father. Amanda and Nikita do not allow Alex to drink alcohol to keep her from relapsing.

=== Season 1 ===
Alex is arrested while robbing a drug store with her abusive boyfriend, Ronnie; Ronnie shoots the store owner and runs away as the police arrive, leaving Alex with the stolen drugs. Alex is blamed for the murder and sent to prison—shortly after, Alex wakes up in Division, with her cover story being that she committed suicide in prison, and meets with Michael, who brings her into the organization as a new recruit.

=== Season 2 ===
Alex works with the Division to gather the intel and resources she needs to reclaim her birthright. She claims that she is merely using the Division and has gone on missions if they provided vital information on Semak. Percy agrees to feed information to Amanda if Alex is the one sent to talk to him.

=== Season 3 ===
Alex reprises her alter ego, the spoiled Russian princess Alexandra Udinov. Liza's abduction brings up painful old memories for Alex, who tries to get closer to Liza's mother. Nikita, Michael, and Sean attempt to stop a terrorist attack but are one man down after Alex is shot to save Nikita by taking a bullet to her shoulder, Nikita goes to kill Mia for revenge.

== Reception ==
"However, praise must certainly go to Lyndsy Fonseca, who plays Alex. The tortured, recalcitrant junkie kid in the flashbacks could easily have been overplayed, but she handled it extremely well, showing breadth in her abilities this early on, and in the present day scenes she also gives off the unmistakeable aura of someone who is a little bit harder than they are letting on."

— Luke Holland of Den of Geek

Lyndsy Fonseca has received generally positive reviews for her portrayal of Alex. Jonah Krakow of IGN called Alex "a beautiful young woman" and said that "Alex's story was [his] favorite part of the show". Episodes such as "2.0" and "Alexandra" were praised by critics for the look into Alex's past and background. Gabrielle Compolongo of TV Fanatic said that "Alex plays the clueless trainee perfectly" and she does "every intelligent thing" not to be caught. Luke Holland of Den of Geek also praised Alex's abilities, saying that Fonseca showed "breadth in her abilities".
