= Lyndsy Fonseca =

American actress (born 1987)

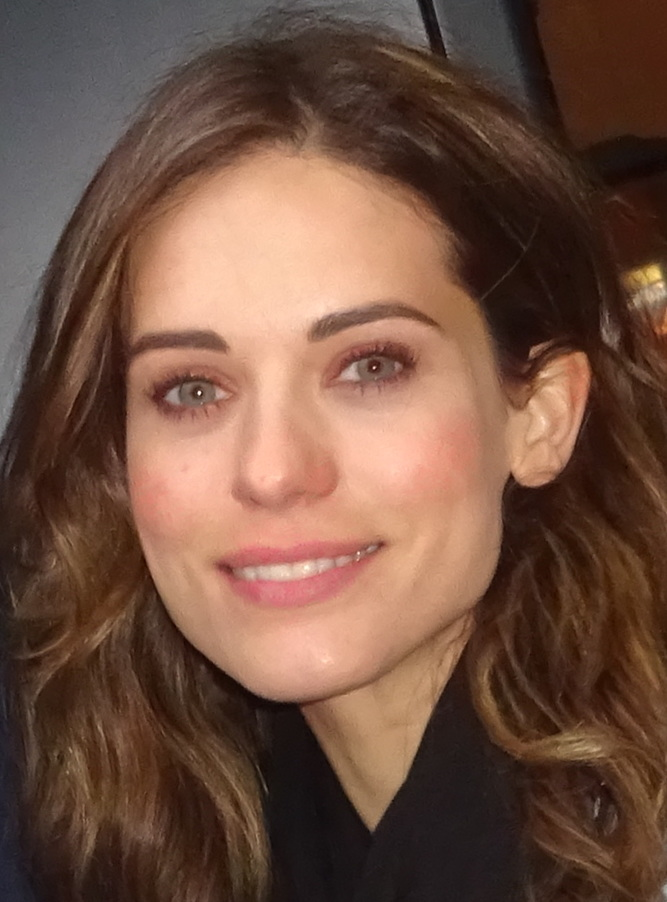
- Fonseca in 2017
- Born: Lyndsy Marie Fonseca; January 7, 1987 (age 39); Oakland, California, U.S.
- Occupation: Actress
- Years active: 2000–present
- Spouses: Matthew Smiley (m. 2009; div. 2013) Noah Bean (m. 2016)
- Children: 2

Lyndsy Marie Fonseca (born January 7, 1987) is an American actress. She began her career by appearing as Colleen Carlton on the CBS daytime soap opera The Young and the Restless, on which she starred between 2001 and 2005. Thereafter, she had a series of other recurring roles, including Penny Mosby on the CBS sitcom How I Met Your Mother, Donna on HBO's Big Love, and Dylan Mayfair on the fourth season of the ABC television series Desperate Housewives.

From 2010 to 2013, Fonseca starred as Alex Udinov on The CW's Nikita, and from 2015 to 2016 she played Angie Martinelli on ABC's Agent Carter. She has also appeared in a variety of film roles, including Jenny in Hot Tub Time Machine (2010) and Katie Deauxma in Kick-Ass (2010) and its 2013 sequel.

== Early life ==
Lyndsy Marie Fonseca was born on January 7, 1987, in Oakland, California, the daughter of Lima Lynn (née Bergmann) and James Victor Fonseca. She ethnically identifies as "half Portuguese". James's mother was an artist who made quilts, doll clothes, and stained glass. Fonseca's parents married in 1985 and divorced when she was two years old. Lima, a psychologist, later married attorney Reid Dworkin, through whom Fonseca has a half-sister. Fonseca completed a course at Barbizon Modeling and Acting School in San Francisco and, at the age of 12, moved to Los Angeles. She soon made her screen debut as Colleen Connelly-Carlton on the soap opera The Young and the Restless.

== Career ==
In 2005, Fonseca played a recurring role as Ted Mosby's future daughter on How I Met Your Mother and as Donna on HBO's Big Love. She starred in the 2005 Hallmark TV film Ordinary Miracles, as a 16-year-old juvenile delinquent who goes to live with a judge (Jaclyn Smith). In late 2007, Fonseca played Dawn in the film Remember the Daze.

She joined the cast of ABC's Desperate Housewives in the series' fourth season as Dylan Mayfair, the daughter of Katherine Mayfair (Dana Delany), a character moving onto Wisteria Lane. In 2008, she was nominated for the Actor award at the Screen Actors Guild Awards for Outstanding Performance by an Ensemble in a Comedy Series for Desperate Housewives, shared with the cast.

Fonseca played Katie Deauxma in the 2010 superhero film Kick-Ass, followed by appearances in three more American films in 2010, including Hot Tub Time Machine. In 2010, Fonseca was cast in a starring role in the CW television series Nikita as Alex, a new recruit, a role she played throughout the series' four seasons. During its run, the Nikita cast included her Kick-Ass co-star Xander Berkeley and her future husband, co-star Noah Bean.

Fonseca starred in the 2021 Disney+ series Turner & Hooch, a remake of the 1989 film of the same name.

== Personal life ==
Fonseca married Matthew Smiley in April 2009. The couple separated in July 2012, and Fonseca filed for divorce in January 2013, citing "irreconcilable differences".

In February 2016, Fonseca announced her engagement to her Nikita co-star, actor Noah Bean. She and Bean married on October 2, 2016, in Connecticut. Fonseca and Bean have a daughter, born in February 2018. A second daughter was born to the couple in June 2022.

Fonseca was listed at No. 62 on the 2010 Maxim Hot 100 and No. 88 on the 2011 list.

== Filmography ==
=== Film ===
Year	Title	Role	Notes
2006	Intellectual Property	Jenny	
2007	Remember the Daze	Dawn	
2010	Kick-Ass	Katie Deauxma	
2010	Hot Tub Time Machine	Jenny	
2010	The Ward	Iris	
2011	Fort McCoy	Anna Gerkey	
2013	Kick-Ass 2	Katie Deauxma	
2015	The Escort	Natalie	
2016	Moments of Clarity	Danielle	
2017	Curvature	Helen	
2023	Spinning Gold	Joyce Biawitz	
2026	Don't Move	Megan Forrester	

=== Television ===
Year	Title	Role	Notes
2001–2005	The Young and the Restless	Colleen Carlton	Regular role
2003	Boston Public	Jenn Cardell	4 episodes
2004	Malcolm in the Middle	Olivia	Episode: "Lois' Sister"
2004	NYPD Blue	Madison Bernstein	Episode: "Colonel Knowledge"
2004	Switched!	Herself	Episode: "Lyndsy/Jessie"
2005	I Do, They Don't	Sandy Barber	Television film
2005	Ordinary Miracles	Sally Anne Powell	Television film
2005	Cyber Seduction: His Secret Life	Amy	Television film
2005–2014	How I Met Your Mother	Penny Mosby	Recurring role (Note: All scenes filmed between 2005 and 2007.)
2006	Waterfront	Annabelle Marks	Unaired CBS series
2006	Phil of the Future	Kristy	Episode: "Not-So-Great Great Great Grandpa"
2006–2009	Big Love	Donna	Recurring role (seasons 1–3)
2007	Close to Home	Jessica Conlon	Episode: "Hoosier Hold Em"
2007	CSI: Crime Scene Investigation	Megan Cooper	Episode: "Fallen Idols"
2007	House	Addie	Episode: "Resignation"
2007	Heroes	April	Episode: "Four Months Later..."
2007–2009	Desperate Housewives	Dylan Mayfair	Recurring role (season 4); guest role (season 6)
2010–2013	Nikita	Alex Udinov	Main role
2011	Five	Cheyanne	Television film
2015–2016	Agent Carter	Angie Martinelli	Recurring role (season 1); guest role (season 2)
2015–2016	Grandfathered	Frankie	Episodes: "Sexy Guardian Angel", "The Sat Pack"
2016	RePlay	Allison	Web series (go90); main role
2016	The World's Biggest Asshole	Sarah	Television short
2016	Pitch	Cara	Episode: "Wear It"
2017	The Haunted	Juno Bradley	Unsold television pilot (Syfy)
2020, 2023	9-1-1: Lone Star	Iris Blake	4 episodes
2020	You Can't Take My Daughter	Amy Thompson	Television film
2021	Turner & Hooch	Laura Turner	Main role
2021	Next Stop, Christmas	Angie	Television film
2022	North to Home	Posy	Television film
2023	Where Are You Christmas?	Addy	Television film
2024	The Magic of Lemon Drops	Lolly	Television film
2025	Single on the 25th	Nell Duke	Hallmark TV film
2026	The Love Heist	Kayli	Hallmark TV film
2026	Holiday Touchdown: A Bears Love Story	Avery	Hallmark TV film

== Awards and nominations ==
Year	Association	Category	Nominated work	Result	Ref.
2008	Screen Actors Guild	Outstanding Performance by an Ensemble in a Comedy Series	Desperate Housewives (shared with rest of cast)	Nominated	
2009	Screen Actors Guild	Outstanding Performance by an Ensemble in a Comedy Series	Desperate Housewives (shared with rest of cast)	Nominated	
2010	Scream Awards	Breakout Performance – Female	Kick-Ass	Nominated	
2011	Teen Choice Awards	Choice TV Actress: Action	Nikita	Nominated	
2012	Teen Choice Awards	Choice TV Actress: Action	Nikita	Nominated	
2013	Teen Choice Awards	Choice TV Actress: Action	Nikita	Nominated	
