= List of Nikita episodes =

Nikita is an American television drama for the CW that premiered on September 9, 2010. It is based on the 1990 French film La Femme Nikita, 1993 remake Point of No Return, and the 1997 television series La Femme Nikita. The story centers on a secret organization known as Division. Targeting young people from troubled backgrounds, Division erases all evidence of their past lives and molds them into efficient spies and assassins. Nikita is the first recruit to escape and promises to bring down her former employers. Having trained Nikita, Michael, a Division operative, is ordered by his boss Percy to deal with his former student. In the meantime, Division continues training its recruits, Thom, Jaden, and the newest, Alex.

The network picked up the series on May 18, 2010 and it began airing during the 2010–11 television season. On October 22, 2010, the CW gave Nikita a full season pickup of 22 episodes. On May 17, 2011, the CW renewed Nikita for a second season. On August 3, 2011, the network ordered an additional episode for the second season, which totalled 23 episodes. On May 11, 2012, the series was renewed for a third season. On May 9, 2013, the CW renewed the series for a fourth and final season consisting of six episodes.

A total of 73 episodes of Nikita were broadcast over four seasons, between September 9, 2010, and December 27, 2013.

== Series overview ==
Season	Episodes	Originally released	
Season	Episodes	First released	Last released
1	22	September 9, 2010	May 12, 2011
2	23	September 23, 2011	May 18, 2012
3	22	October 19, 2012	May 17, 2013
4	6	November 22, 2013	December 27, 2013

== Episodes ==
=== Season 1 (2010–11) ===
No. overall	No. in season	Title	Directed by	Written by	Original release date	Prod. code	U.S. viewers (millions)
1	1	"Pilot"	Danny Cannon	Craig Silverstein	September 9, 2010	276051	3.57
2	2	"2.0"	Danny Cannon	David Levinson & Craig Silverstein	September 16, 2010	3X6252	3.19
3	3	"Kill Jill"	David Solomon	Amanda Segel	September 23, 2010	3X6253	3.15
4	4	"Rough Trade"	Nick Copus	Carlos Coto	September 30, 2010	3X6254	2.68
5	5	"The Guardian"	David Solomon	Albert Kim	October 7, 2010	3X6255	2.90
6	6	"Resistance"	Guy Ferland	Kalinda Vazquez	October 21, 2010	3X6256	2.81
7	7	"The Recruit"	Eagle Egilsson	Amanda Segel	October 28, 2010	3X6257	2.48
8	8	"Phoenix"	David M. Barrett	Jim Barnes	November 4, 2010	3X6258	2.41
9	9	"One Way"	Ken Fink	Albert Kim	November 11, 2010	3X6259	2.33
10	10	"Dark Matter"	Danny Cannon	Carlos Coto	December 2, 2010	3X6260	2.30
11	11	"All the Way"	Terrence O'Hara	Craig Silverstein	December 9, 2010	3X6261	2.29
12	12	"Free"	Jonathan Glassner	Kalinda Vazquez	January 27, 2011	3X6262	2.62
13	13	"Coup de Grace"	Nathan Hope	Albert Kim	February 3, 2011	3X6263	2.40
14	14	"The Next Seduction"	David Solomon	Carlos Coto	February 10, 2011	3X6264	1.89
15	15	"Alexandra"	Ken Fink	Andrew Colville	February 17, 2011	3X6265	2.10
16	16	"Echoes"	Nick Copus	Kristen Reidel	February 24, 2011	3X6266	2.14
17	17	"Covenant"	Eagle Egilsson	Jim Barnes	April 7, 2011	3X6267	1.82
18	18	"Into the Dark"	Jeffrey Hunt	Albert Kim	April 14, 2011	3X6268	2.21
19	19	"Girl's Best Friend"	Robert Lieberman	Carlos Coto	April 21, 2011	3X6269	2.01
20	20	"Glass Houses"	Ralph Hemecker	Kalinda Vazquez	April 28, 2011	3X6270	1.72
21	21	"Betrayals"	Eagle Egilsson	Andrew Colville	May 5, 2011	3X6271	2.00
22	22	"Pandora"	Ken Fink	Craig Silverstein	May 12, 2011	3X6272	1.94

=== Season 2 (2011–12) ===
No. overall	No. in season	Title	Directed by	Written by	Original release date	Prod. code	U.S. viewers (millions)
23	1	"Game Change"	Danny Cannon	Craig Silverstein	September 23, 2011	3X7151	1.85
24	2	"Falling Ash"	Eagle Egilsson	Kalinda Vazquez	September 30, 2011	3X7152	1.73
25	3	"Knightfall"	Ken Fink	Carlos Coto	October 7, 2011	3X7153	1.57
26	4	"Partners"	Dermott Downs	Kristen Reidel	October 14, 2011	3X7154	1.65
27	5	"Looking Glass"	Ken Girotti	Albert Kim	October 21, 2011	3X7155	1.69
28	6	"343 Walnut Lane"	Nick Copus	Andrew Colville	October 28, 2011	3X7156	1.77
29	7	"Clawback"	Eagle Egilsson	Michael Brandon Guercio	November 4, 2011	3X7157	1.79
30	8	"London Calling"	Jeffrey Hunt	Kalinda Vazquez	November 11, 2011	3X7158	1.89
31	9	"Fair Trade"	Nick Copus	Carlos Coto	November 18, 2011	3X7159	1.79
32	10	"Guardians"	Dwight Little	Albert Kim	December 2, 2011	3X7160	1.68
33	11	"Pale Fire"	Deran Sarafian	Kristen Reidel	January 6, 2012	3X7161	1.56
34	12	"Sanctuary"	Steven A. Adelson	Andrew Colville	January 13, 2012	3X7162	1.49
35	13	"Clean Sweep"	Brad Turner	Kalinda Vazquez	February 3, 2012	3X7163	1.45
36	14	"Rogue"	Marc David Alpert	Carlos Coto	February 10, 2012	3X7164	1.45
37	15	"Origins"	Michael Robison	Albert Kim	February 17, 2012	3X7165	1.51
38	16	"Doublecross"	Eagle Egilsson	Kristen Reidel	March 16, 2012	3X7166	1.51
39	17	"Arising"	Karen Gaviola	Andrew Colville	March 23, 2012	3X7167	1.46
40	18	"Power"	Chris Peppe	Carlos Coto	March 30, 2012	3X7168	1.32
41	19	"Wrath"	Jeffrey Hunt	Albert Kim	April 20, 2012	3X7169	1.39
42	20	"Shadow Walker"	Nick Copus	Kristen Reidel	April 27, 2012	3X7170	1.29
43	21	"Dead Drop"	Michael Robison	Kalinda Vazquez	May 4, 2012	3X7171	1.22
44	22	"Crossbow"	Danny Cannon	Andrew Colville	May 11, 2012	3X7172	1.25
45	23	"Homecoming"	Eagle Egilsson	Carlos Coto	May 18, 2012	3X7173	1.42

=== Season 3 (2012–13) ===
No. overall	No. in season	Title	Directed by	Written by	Original release date	Prod. code	U.S. viewers (millions)
46	1	"3.0"	Eagle Egilsson	Craig Silverstein	October 19, 2012	3X7351	0.95
47	2	"Innocence"	John Badham	Mary Trahan	October 26, 2012	3X7353	0.81
48	3	"True Believer"	Danny Cannon	Carlos Coto	November 2, 2012	3X7352	1.14
49	4	"Consequences"	Nick Copus	Kristen Reidel	November 9, 2012	3X7354	0.86
50	5	"The Sword's Edge"	Kenneth Fink	Albert Kim	November 30, 2012	3X7355	1.20
51	6	"Sideswipe"	Joshua Butler	Terry Matalas & Travis Fickett	December 7, 2012	3X7356	1.19
52	7	"Intersection"	Dwight Little	Michael Brandon Guercio	January 18, 2013	3X7357	1.27
53	8	"Aftermath"	Brad Turner	Carlos Coto	January 25, 2013	3X7358	1.53
54	9	"Survival Instincts"	John Showalter	Albert Kim	February 1, 2013	3X7359	1.23
55	10	"Brave New World"	Marc David Alpert	Kristen Reidel	February 8, 2013	3X7360	1.34
56	11	"Black Badge"	David Grossman	Mary Trahan	February 22, 2013	3X7361	1.24
57	12	"With Fire"	Eagle Egilsson	Carlos Coto	March 1, 2013	3X7362	1.01
58	13	"Reunion"	Jon Cassar	Terry Matalas & Travis Fickett	March 8, 2013	3X7363	1.37
59	14	"The Life We've Chosen"	Brad Turner	Albert Kim	March 15, 2013	3X7364	1.21
60	15	"Inevitability"	Mark C. Baldwin	Kristen Reidel	March 29, 2013	3X7365	1.22
61	16	"Tipping Point"	Dwight Little	Oliver Grigsby	April 5, 2013	3X7366	1.23
62	17	"Masks"	Chris Peppe	Kamran Pasha	April 12, 2013	3X7367	1.15
63	18	"Broken Home"	John Badham	Terry Matalas & Travis Fickett	April 19, 2013	3X7368	0.97
64	19	"Self-Destruct"	Nick Copus	Kristen Reidel	April 26, 2013	3X7369	0.95
65	20	"High-Value Target"	Dan Sackheim	Michael Brandon Guercio	May 3, 2013	3X7370	1.03
66	21	"Invisible Hand"	Dwight Little	Carlos Coto	May 10, 2013	3X7371	1.01
67	22	"Til Death Do Us Part"	Eagle Egilsson	Albert Kim	May 17, 2013	3X7372	1.00

=== Season 4 (2013) ===
No. overall	No. in season	Title	Directed by	Written by	Original release date	Prod. code	U.S. viewers (millions)
68	1	"Wanted"	Eagle Egilsson	Kristen Reidel	November 22, 2013	4X5251	0.74
69	2	"Dead or Alive"	John Badham	Albert Kim	November 29, 2013	4X5252	0.86
70	3	"Set-Up"	Marc David Alpert	Carlos Coto	December 6, 2013	4X5253	0.85
71	4	"Pay-Off"	Dwight Little	Terry Matalas & Travis Fickett	December 13, 2013	4X5254	0.64
72	5	"Bubble"	Nick Copus	Oliver Grigsby	December 20, 2013	4X5255	0.69
73	6	"Canceled"	Eagle Egilsson	Albert Kim & Carlos Coto	December 27, 2013	4X5256	0.82

== Ratings ==
Nikita : U.S. viewers per episode (millions)

Season	Episode number																						
Season	1	2	3	4	5	6	7	8	9	10	11	12	13	14	15	16	17	18	19	20	21	22	23
1	3.57	3.19	3.15	2.68	2.90	2.81	2.48	2.41	2.33	2.30	2.29	2.62	2.40	1.89	2.10	2.14	1.82	2.21	2.01	1.72	2.00	1.94	–
2	1.85	1.73	1.57	1.65	1.69	1.77	1.79	1.89	1.79	1.68	1.56	1.49	1.45	1.45	1.51	1.51	1.46	1.32	1.39	1.29	1.22	1.25	1.42
3	0.95	0.81	1.14	0.86	1.20	1.19	1.27	1.53	1.23	1.34	1.24	1.01	1.37	1.21	1.22	1.23	1.15	0.97	0.95	1.03	1.01	1.00	–
4	0.74	0.86	0.85	0.64	0.69	0.82	–																

Audience measurement performed by Nielsen Media Research

Season	Timeslot (ET/PT)	# Ep.	Premiered		Ended		Rank	Viewers Live+SD (in millions)
Season	Timeslot (ET/PT)	# Ep.	Date	Premiere viewers (in millions)	Date	Finale viewers (in millions)	Rank	Viewers Live+SD (in millions)
Season 1	Thursday 9:00 pm	22	September 9, 2010	3.57	May 12, 2011	1.94	#135	2.32
Season 2	Friday 8:00 pm	23	September 23, 2011	1.85	May 18, 2012	1.42	#182	1.77
Season 3	Friday 9:00 pm (Oct 19 – Nov 9); Friday 8:00 pm (Nov 30 – May 17)	22	October 19, 2012	0.95	May 17, 2013	1.00	#145	1.38
Season 4	Friday 9:00 pm	6	November 22, 2013	0.74	December 27, 2013	0.82	TBA	TBA
