= The Sinking Ship The Grand Applause =

- Gotham episode
- Episode no.: Season 4 Episode 15
- Directed by: Nick Copus
- Written by: Seth Boston
- Cinematography by: David Stockton
- Editing by: Sarah C. Reeves
- Production code: T40.10015
- Original air date: March 22, 2018
- Running time: 43 minutes

Guest appearances
- Nathan Darrow as Victor Fries / Mr. Freeze; Christopher Convery as Martin; Stu "Large" Riley as Sampson; Kyle Vincent Terry as Headhunter; Anthony Carrigan as Victor Zsasz

Episode chronology
← Previous "Reunion"	Next → "One of My Three Soups"
- Gotham season 4

"The Sinking Ship The Grand Applause" is the fifteenth episode of the fourth season and 81st episode overall from the Fox series Gotham. The show is itself based on the characters created by DC Comics set in the Batman mythology. The episode was written by Seth Boston and directed by Nick Copus. It was first broadcast on March 22, 2018.

In the episode, Jim Gordon and Harvey Bullock are intent on finding Oswald Cobblepot's accountant, who may have information regarding Sofia Falcone. With the conflict between Cobblepot and Sofia arising, Cobblepot is trying to form alliances to win the war but Edward Nygma gets stuck in the conflict. Meanwhile, Bruce helps Selina with a debt of her while Barbara Kean begins suffering the effect of the Lazarus Pit.

The episode shares a title with a song by the band The Paper Chase from Dallas, Texas.

== Plot ==
Nygma (Cory Michael Smith) guides Martin (Christopher Convery) to follow his instructions and kills the people sheltering him before taking him. Bruce (David Mazouz) and Selina (Camren Bicondova) reconcile with one another after fixing a problem she had with a debt.

Bullock (Donal Logue) meets with a former assassin that worked with Falcone to get info from a person Falcone trusted, discovering it is Arthur Penn (Andrew Sellon), who is also Cobblepot's accountant. After realizing Martin has been taken, Sofia (Crystal Reed) orders Zsasz (Anthony Carrigan) to kill Cobblepot (Robin Lord Taylor), accompanied by Headhunter (Kyle Vincent Terry), who managed to survive his stabbing. Bullock intercepts them in Arkham Asylum and police officers force them to leave but he discovers that Cobblepot escaped with the help of Nygma.

Cobblepot and Nygma arrive with Lee (Morena Baccarin) to form an alliance and kill Sofia. Nygma also goes to recruit Grundy (Drew Powell) but discovers he got back his memories and is knocked out. He's then brought to Barbara (Erin Richards) and Tabitha (Jessica Lucas), who plan to send him to Sofia. Gordon (Ben McKenzie) and Bullock intercept Cobblepot in the street and after getting a possible lead on Penn, they arrest him. However, they engage in a gunfight with Zsasz and Headhunter, giving Lee a chance to escape with Cobblepot. Lee and Cobblepot go with Victor Fries (Nathan Darrow) to get him to Sofia, so he freezes Cobblepot.

Sofia has Nygma tortured but he refuses to talk. Fries arrives with Cobblepot frozen in a block of ice and gives it to Sofia, who orders Nygma to be killed in the docks. But after she leaves, a timer in the ice melts it and Cobblepot escapes. Gordon and Bullock arrive at a resort spa where they take Penn (Andrew Sellon). Penn admits that he works for Sofia and informed her of everything Cobblepot did. Sofia and her assailants arrive and start a shooting. Bullock manages to escape with Penn but Gordon is shot multiple times by Sofia, who chastises him for his attempts to stop her. Before she can kill him, she is shot in the head by Lee.

Cobblepot kills Nygma's assailants and saves him. Gordon wakes up from his injuries, being informed by Bullock that somehow Sofia ended up in a coma. Gordon tells him his intentions to confess but Bullock tells him that the city needs him and he will need to live with it as punishment. Lee reclaims the Narrows and smashes Sampson's (Stu "Large" Riley) hand with a hammer. Barbara suffers severe headaches, sees her hand shining and finds Ra's al Ghul (Alexander Siddig) walking towards her.

== Production ==
=== Development ===
In March 2018, it was announced that the fifteenth episode of the season would be titled "The Sinking Ship The Grand Applause" and was to be written by Seth Boston and directed by Nick Copus.

=== Casting ===
Sean Pertwee, and Chris Chalk do not appear in the episode as their respective characters. In March 2018, it was announced that the guest cast for the episode would include Anthony Carrigan as Victor Zsasz, Kyle Vincent Terry as Headhunter, Stu "Large" Riley as Sampson, Christopher Convery as Martin, and Nathan Darrow as Mr. Freeze.

== Reception ==
=== Viewers ===
The episode was watched by 2.47 million viewers with a 0.7/3 share among adults aged 18 to 49. This was a slight decrease in viewership from the previous episode, which was watched by 2.55 million viewers with a 0.6/2 in the 18-49 demographics. With these ratings, Gotham ranked first for Fox, beating Showtime at the Apollo, fourth on its timeslot, and seventh for the night, behind A.P. Bio, Superstore, Station 19, Chicago Fire, an NCAA game, and Grey's Anatomy.

With DVR factored in, the episode was viewed by 4.01 million viewers with a 1.2 in the 18-49 demo.
