= Kill Jill =

Kill Jill

- "Kill Jill", an episode of the American television drama series Nikita
- "Kill Jill", a song by Big Boi from the album Boomiverse
