= Tiffany Hines =

American actress (born 1983)

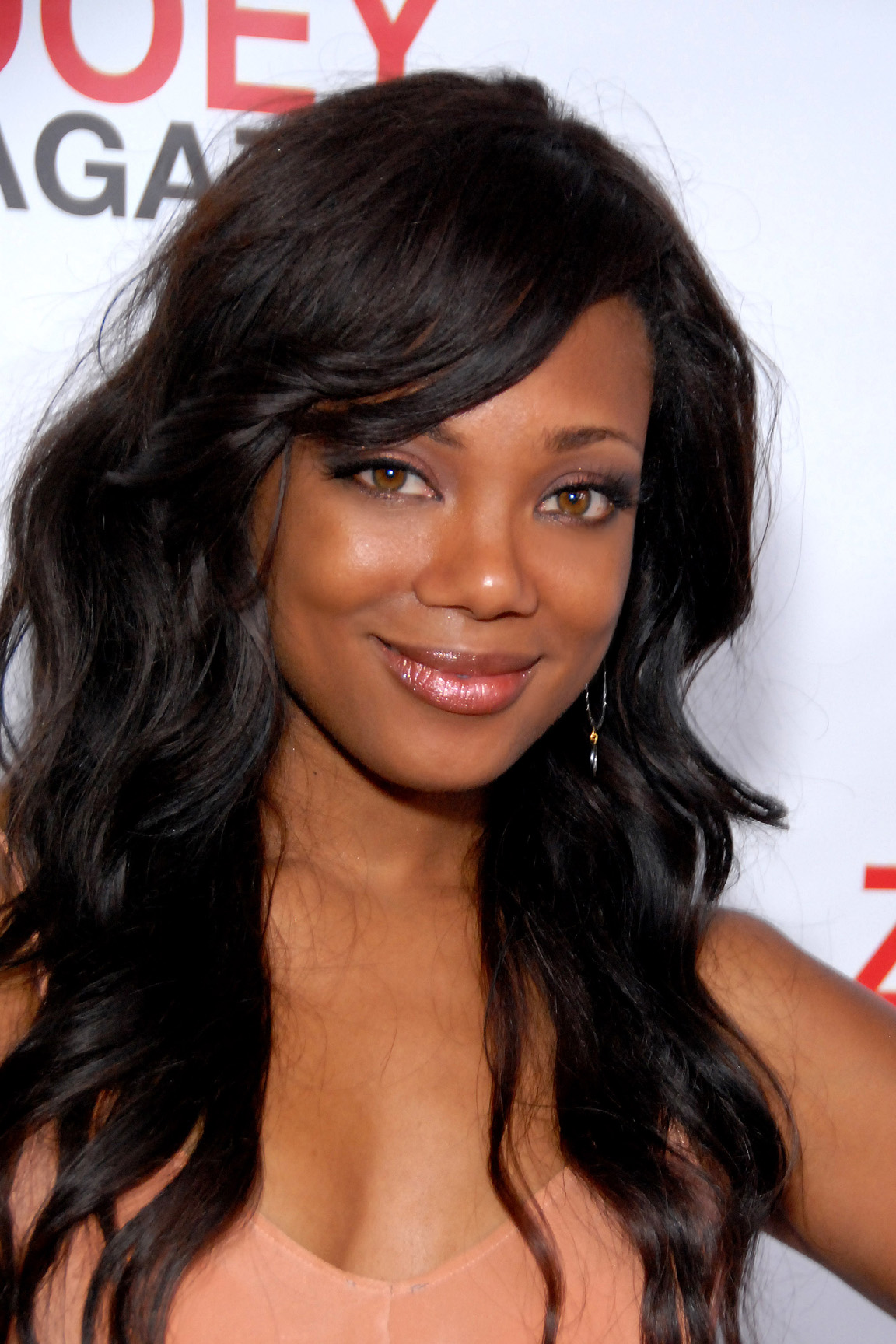
- Hines in September 2011
- Born: September 2, 1977 (age 49)
- Occupation: Actress
- Years active: 2006–present

Tiffany Hines (born September 2, 1977) is an American actress, known for her roles as Birdie Scott in Beyond the Break, Michelle Welton in Bones, Jaden in Nikita, Didi Miller in Devious Maids, Tamar Braxton in Toni Braxton: Unbreak My Heart, Aisha in 24: Legacy, Eve Vincent in Hit the Floor, and Lara Nuzo in Magnum P.I..

== Career ==
She starred as Birdie Scott in The N drama series Beyond the Break from 2006 to 2009. Hines guest-starred in television series such as Grey's Anatomy, Heroes, Criminal Minds, Miss Guided, Lincoln Heights, CSI: Crime Scene Investigation, Secret Girlfriend, 10 Things I Hate About You, and Lie to Me. She also starred in the NBC miniseries Meteor in 2009. Her film credits include The Winged Man, Shark Swarm, Dandelion Dharma, Perfect Combination, and The Dark Party.

She played the recurring character Michelle Welton, the adopted teenage daughter of Dr. Camille Saroyan, in the Fox series Bones.

Hines starred as Jaden in The CW drama series Nikita from 2010 to 2011. She appeared in the fourth season of The CW's teen drama series 90210 as a detective named Kat, who helps Navid to arrest his uncle Amal. In 2012, she was cast in the ABC soapy pilot Americana, and in 2014 began a recurring role as Didi Miller in the Lifetime comedy-drama Devious Maids. In 2015, she performed guest-starring roles in Fox's Backstrom and CBS's Stalker; recurred as Marta Rodriguez in Stitchers, and starred in Damien in spring 2016. She recurred as Aisha in 24: Legacy opposite Corey Hawkins, Bashy, and Anna Diop. She starred as Eve Vincent in the last season of BET's Hit the Floor and recurred as Lara Nuzo in the Magnum P.I. reboot on CBS opposite Jay Hernandez, Perdita Weeks, Sung Kang, and Zachary Knighton. In Summer 2019, she played the starring role of Elizabeth Bennet in the Lifetime network's Pride and Prejudice: Atlanta, based on the Jane Austen novel, with an African-American cast.

== Filmography ==
=== Films ===
Year	Title	Role	Notes
2008	The Winged Man	Allysha	Short
2008	Shark Swarm	Michelle	TV movie
2009	Dandelion Dharma	Sylvie	Short
2010	Perfect Combination	Lia	
2012	Americana	Shane Kelly	TV movie
2013	The Dark Party	Makayda	
2014	Black Coffee	Lia	
2015	Bound & Babysitting	Elena	TV movie
2015	Toxin	Rhonda	
2016	Toni Braxton: Unbreak My Heart	Tamar Braxton	TV movie
2017	Real Artists	Sophia Baker	Short
2018	He Loved Them All	Melinda Wells	TV movie
2019	Pride and Prejudice: Atlanta	Elizabeth Bennet	TV movie

=== Television ===
Year	Title	Role	Notes
2006	Grey's Anatomy	Natalie	Recurring cast: season 2
2006	Heroes	Cheerleader	Episode: "Homecoming"
2006–09	Beyond the Break	Birdie Scott	Main cast
2007	Criminal Minds	Naomi	Episode: "Fear and Loathing"
2008	Miss Guided	Pretty student	Episode: "Homecoming"
2008	Lincoln Heights	Kelly Hawkins	Episode: "The Price You Pay" & "Prom Night"
2008	CSI: Crime Scene Investigation	Layla Wells	Episode: "Young Man with a Horn"
2009	Meteor	Maya	Episode: "Episode #1.1 & #1.2"
2009	Secret Girlfriend	Amy	Recurring cast
2009–17	Bones	Michelle Welton	Recurring cast: season 4-9 & 12; replaced Dana Davis
2010	10 Things I Hate About You	Kaitlin	Recurring cast
2010	Lie to Me	Lacey	Episode: "Darkness and Light"
2010–11	Nikita	Jaden	Main cast: Season 1
2011–12	90210	Kat	Recurring cast: Season 4
2014	Devious Maids	Didi Miller	Recurring cast: Season 2
2014	The Other Hef	Tiffany	Recurring cast
2014	Rush	Steffi	Episode: "Get Lucky" & "Dirty Work"
2015	Backstrom	Cassandra Lastrange	Episode: "Dragon Slayer"
2015	Stalker	Skye	Episode: "Salvation"
2015	Stitchers	Marta Rodriguez	Recurring cast: season 1
2016	Damien	Kelly Baptiste	Recurring cast
2017	24: Legacy	Aisha	Recurring cast
2018	Hit the Floor	Eve Vincent	Main cast: season 4
2018	Magnum P.I.	Lara Nuzo	Episode: "I Saw the Sun Rise" & “Shallow Grave, Deep Water”
2022	The Guardians of Justice	Black Bow	Main cast
