= Sonya Balmores =

American actress

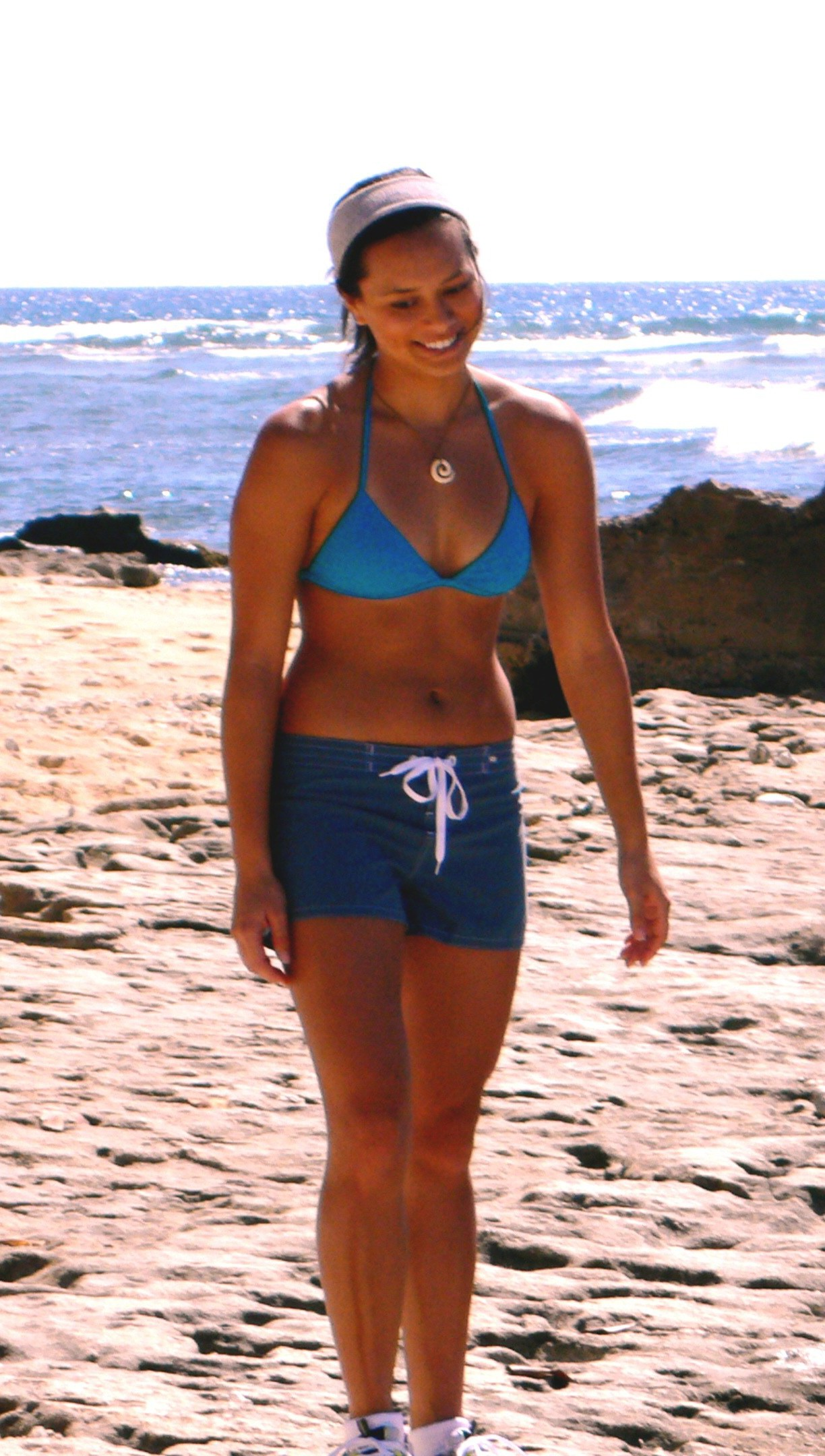
- Born: June 23, 1986 (age 38); Kalaheo, Hawaii, U.S.
- Years active: 2003–present
- Title: Miss Hawaii Teen USA 2004
- Spouse: Kanoa Chung

Sonya Balmores (born June 23, 1986) is an American actress, model, and surfer from Kalaheo, Hawaii who also competed in the Miss Teen USA pageant.

== Early life and education ==
Balmores was born to a Filipino father and a mother of Irish and Native American descent. She attended Kalaheo Elementary School and graduated from Kauai High School. She was a visual communications student at Hawaii Pacific University.

== Modeling career ==
Balmores won the Miss Hawaii Teen USA title on May 16, 2004, at the Waikiki Sheraton Resort. Balmores represented Hawaii in the Miss Teen USA 2004 pageant held in Palm Springs, California on August 6, 2004. She placed first runner-up in the pageant, which was won by Miss Louisiana Teen USA Shelley Hennig. This was Hawaii's highest placement in the pageant since Kelly Hu won in 1985.

In 2005, Balmores appeared on the covers of Women's Health, Outside and Foam magazines.

== Acting career ==
Balmores played the series regular role of Kai Kealoha in Beyond the Break on The N, a series that was initially given the tentative title Boarding School.

In 2011, she portrayed the main antagonist, Malina Birch, in the biographical drama film Soul Surfer. In 2014, Balmores guest-starred in an episode of Hawaii Five-0 titled "Kanalu Hope Loa" ("The Last Break") as Alana Duncan, a tour bus robber. She joined the Marvel Cinematic Universe in 2017, playing Auran in the television series Inhumans.

In 2022, Balmores appeared in the historical drama series The Chosen portraying the character Fatiyah.

== Filmography ==
=== Film ===
Film roles
Year	Title	Role	Notes
2008	Ride the Wake	Katelynn	Short film
2011	Soul Surfer	Malina Birch	
2017	Kuleana	Kimberly Coyle	
2018	Den of Thieves	Malia	
2020	Sidewinder	Maggie	Short film

=== Television ===
Television roles
Year	Title	Role	Notes
2003	The Break	Nani	TV movie
2005	Rocky Point	Tattooed Girl	Episode: "Pilot"
2006–2009	Beyond the Break	Lanikai 'Kai' Kealoha	Main role
2014	Hawaii Five-0	Alana Duncan	Episode: "Kanalu Hope Loa"
2016	A Midsummer's Hawaiian Dream	Tanya McQueen	TV movie
2016	NCIS	Metro PD Officer Sandra Cornell	Episode: "Home of the Brave"
2016	Option Zero	Emily	TV movie
2017	Ballers	Arielle	2 episodes
2017	Inhumans	Auran	Recurring role, 8 episodes
2018	Lucifer	Wild Child	Episode: "All About Her"
2019	Roswell, New Mexico	Arizona	Season 1 Episode 9: "Songs About Texas"
2019	Magnum P.I.	Leanna Owens	Season 2 Episode 1: "Payback for Beginners"
2019	Breckman Rodeo	Kirby White	TV movie
2020	FBI: Most Wanted	Angelyne LaCroix	Season 1 Episode 4: "Caesar"
2021	I Know What You Did Last Summer	Mel Gilbert	Recurring role
2023–2025	The Chosen	Fatiyah	3 episodes
2025	The Cleaning Lady	Vanessa Sanchez	Season 4 Episode 8: "I Heard It Through the Grapevine"

=== Video game ===
Video game roles
Year	Title	Role	Notes
2019	Tom Clancy's The Division 2	Alani Kelso	
