= Kalinda Vazquez =

Television writer and producer

- Born: New York, NY
- Other names: Kalinda Vasquez
- Occupation(s): Television writer, producer
- Years active: 2003–present

Kalinda Vazquez is an American television writer and producer.

She is well known for her work on the Fox drama Prison Break and The CW espionage series Nikita.

== Career ==
Vazquez worked as a writing assistant, staff writer and story editor from 2006 to 2009 on the Fox drama Prison Break. She also contributed several scripts to the series and co-wrote the final installment Prison Break: The Final Break.

She was an executive story editor and writer on the first season of the Fox action series Human Target.

In summer 2010, she joined the staff of The CW action thriller series Nikita's first season, as a writer and executive story editor. At the start of the second season, Vazquez was promoted to co-producer, a title she held until her departure at the end of the season.

In fall 2012, Vazquez joined the second season crew of the ABC fantasy series Once Upon a Time as a writer and producer.

As of March 2021, Vazquez has a number of projects in development. In February 2021, it was announced that she was working with George R. R. Martin on a television adaptation of Roger Zelazny's novel Roadmarks. Then in March 2021, it was announced that Vazquez had been asked by Paramount Pictures to develop her own idea for a new Star Trek film. Vazquez has previous experience with Star Trek, being credited for the teleplay to the third season episode of Star Trek: Discovery titled Terra Firma, Part 2. She was also named after a character from the original series episode "By Any Other Name".

In December 2021, Vazquez signed a multi-year overall deal with Netflix. Under the deal, she will create, write and produce a young adult mystery thriller Arbor Hall as her own first project.
