= Killer Tongue =

1996 British/Spanish comedy sci-fi/horror film

- Film poster
- Directed by: Alberto Sciamma
- Produced by: Christopher Figg; Andrés Vicente Gómez
- Starring: Melinda Clarke; Jason Durr; Robert Englund
- Cinematography: Denis Crossan
- Edited by: Jeremy Gibbs
- Production companies: Lolafilms; Sociedad General de Televisión (Sogetel); Spice Factory; The Noel Gay Motion Picture Company
- Distributed by: Buena Vista International (Spain); Entertainment Film Distributors (United Kingdom)
- Release dates: 7 September 1996 (TIFF); 15 November 1996 (Spain); 3 April 1998 (United Kingdom)
- Running time: 99 minutes
- Countries: Spain; United Kingdom
- Languages: English; Spanish

Killer Tongue (La lengua asesina) is a 1996 British/Spanish science fiction comedy horror film directed by Alberto Sciamma and starring Melinda Clarke, Jason Durr, and Robert Englund.

In the film, a female bank robber is infected with material from a meteor and transforms into a bloodthirsty killer. Her pet dogs are also infected, and transform into drag queens.

== Plot ==
In a region heavily implied to be the Southern Western U.S. with license plates from Texas and New Mexico seen, taking place after a successful bank heist, Candy and Johnny go on the run, abandoning the rest of their crew. Johnny is soon arrested and Candy is forced to hide out in a convent. An alien infested meteor lands in Candy's soup which infects her and her pet poodles. The infection causes dramatic changes in everyone who has consumed it, causing her poodles to transform into drag queens.

Soon Candy also starts changing, her hair and skin change colour, spikes protrude from her spine, and her tongue extends and soon becomes murderous. This causes Candy to kill multiple people in various ways, by using her now bloodthirsty tongue.

== Cast ==
- Melinda Clarke as Candy
- Jason Durr as Johnny
- Mapi Galán as Rita
- Robert Englund as Prison Director
- Alicia Borrachero as Reporter
- Doug Bradley as Wig
- Terry Forrestal as Postman
- Gareth Marks as Tongue (voice)
- Jonathan Rhys Meyers as Rudolph
- Stephen Marcus as Ralph
- Edward Tudor-Pole as Flash
- Nigel Whitmey as Chip

== Reception ==
=== Critical response ===
Critic review were overwhelmingly negative, criticizing the script, acting and comedy with reviews such as; "An aggressively over-the-top and incoherent spectacle that almost never makes sense" by Rob Gonsalves of Rob's Film Vault and "Sometimes you can know a stinker from its title, and, indeed, something by the name of Killer Tongue has 'crap' written all over it" by Michael Dequina of TheMovieReport.com.

== Awards ==
Melinda Clarke won the 1996 Sitges Film Festival Best Actress Award for her role in Killer Tongue.
