= Nikita season 1 =

Nikita
- Season 1
- Blu-ray cover
- No. of episodes: 22

Release
- Original network: The CW
- Original release: September 9, 2010 – May 12, 2011

Season chronology
- Next → Season 2

The first season of Nikita, an American television drama based on the French film La Femme Nikita (1990), the remake Point of No Return (1993), and a previous series La Femme Nikita (1997). It aired from September 9, 2010, until May 12, 2011, with a total of 22 episodes. The season finale received a 63rd Primetime Emmy Awards nomination for "Outstanding Sound Editing for a Series".

== Cast ==
=== Main cast ===
- Maggie Q as Nikita Mears
- Shane West as Michael Bishop
- Lyndsy Fonseca as Alexandra "Alex" Udinov
- Aaron Stanford as Seymour Birkhoff
- Ashton Holmes as Thom
- Tiffany Hines as Jaden
- Melinda Clarke as Helen "Amanda" Collins
- Xander Berkeley as Percival "Percy" Rose

=== Recurring cast ===
- Rob Stewart as Roan
- Noah Bean as Ryan Fletcher
- Devon Sawa as Owen Elliott

== Episodes ==
No. overall	No. in season	Title	Directed by	Written by	Original release date	Prod. code	U.S. viewers (millions)
1	1	"Pilot"	Danny Cannon	Craig Silverstein	September 9, 2010	276051	3.57
Nikita is a former assassin and spy who worked for Division, a secret U.S. agency, until 2007, when she went underground after they killed Daniel Monroe, her civilian fiancé. Three years later, she resurfaces with the mission to bring down Division by disrupting its operations one at a time. Meanwhile, Alex is arrested for armed robbery; Division recruits her by faking her death and entering her into training to become an assassin. Meanwhile, Nikita is in contact with a source within Division and learns about "Black Arrow", an operation to assassinate an African diplomat. Nikita rescues the diplomat and drops him off at the United Nations. Later, she confronts her former boss, Percy to declare war on Division. Agent Michael, the Division operative who trained Nikita, chases after her, but she wounds him and escapes. Percy tasks Division with finding Nikita, and Alex is revealed to be Nikita's source.
2	2	"2.0"	Danny Cannon	David Levinson & Craig Silverstein	September 16, 2010	3X6252	3.19
Division is tasked with protecting Serbian leader Mirko Dadich, who was exiled from his country for war crimes, in exchange for uranium in Dadich's possession. Alex is activated for an operation earlier than expected; the assignment is to entertain the leader during his stay in America. As Nikita attempts to take out Dadich, he is kidnapped by a group of mercenaries led by the daughter of the lead scientist responsible for Dadich's nuclear program. Both Nikita and Division trace their location to a New York Subway station; it is a race to get the GPS device to locate the uranium. During the firefight between Division and the mercenaries, Nikita steals the GPS device and destroys it. As Dadich is no longer useful, Michael kills him. A flashback from a year ago shows Nikita meeting Alex after saving her life from drug dealers, and then helping Alex through detox before training her. In the flashback, Nikita reveals that she has been searching for Alex for over 2 years, and knows who she really is.
3	3	"Kill Jill"	David Solomon	Amanda Segel	September 23, 2010	3X6253	3.15
To prevent journalist Jill Morelli from attempting to expose a plane crash that was organized by Division, agents frame her for her editor's murder. Nikita rescues Jill, and they work together to expose the story. They contact Jill's source, who has a video in which Division agents can be seen at the site of the crash, covering up the evidence and obtaining cocaine smuggled by the airline's corrupt CEO. Michael, with tracking assistance from Alex and fellow recruits Jaden and Thom, finds the house where Nikita, Jill, and Jill's source are meeting. Michael leads a Division team there and kills Jill's source. Alex secretly alerts police to the area, who arrest Jill while Nikita fights the Division agents. Jill manages to expose the story and clear her name. Meanwhile, Michael and Percy suspect Birkhoff is leaking information to Nikita from inside Division (unaware that the real mole is Alex). After Birkhoff is interrogated by Amanda, they discover a tracker hidden in one of his teeth; Nikita tells Alex that they will need to find another way to cover her tracks. Thom brings Alex a CD player as a reward for her tracking assistance on the operation.
4	4	"Rough Trade"	Nick Copus	Carlos Coto	September 30, 2010	3X6254	2.68
Nikita revisits her first assignment with Division: the assassination of Victor Han, a Homeland Security official who had a wife and baby. Nikita discovers a fashion store that uses a triad gang to employ slave labour. Nikita storms a sweatshop, destroys it, and after following the gang leader, realizes that the man behind the organization is the very same official she thought she had killed on her first assignment. It turns out he faked his death after making a deal with Percy. Nikita travels to Hong Kong, catches Victor, and drops him off outside a police station. Meanwhile, Alex suffers from claustrophobia from a traumatic childhood experience, and Amanda is determined to learn about Alex's past and cure her.
5	5	"The Guardian"	David Solomon	Albert Kim	October 7, 2010	3X6255	2.90
Owen Elliot, an off-the-books Division agent, and guardian to a "black box"—information containing Division's past crimes—narrowly escapes a bank robbery in Montreal, and contacts Percy. Realizing that Division's security is in jeopardy, Percy intends to kill Owen and collect the black box. Nikita meets Owen's girlfriend, Emily, who leads her to finding Owen. However, Emily is killed by Division snipers, and Owen is captured while attempting to avenge her death. Nikita later finds Owen again in a freighter and talks him out of killing Percy. The two escape, but Owen is wounded by Percy. Nikita takes Owen as an ally, and treats his gunshot wound while he is unconscious. Meanwhile, Michael, suspicious of Percy's motives, investigates Owen. Alex sneaks into Percy's office to give information on Owen to Nikita. Thom catches Alex, but she creates a convincing cover story. Alex later thanks Thom for covering for her, and he kisses her, though she pulls away.
6	6	"Resistance"	Guy Ferland	Kalinda Vazquez	October 21, 2010	3X6256	2.81
En route to a training exercise, a bus filled with Division recruits, including Alex and Thom, is attacked by terrorists and the recruits are kidnapped. Unknown to them, the attack, and subsequent kidnap and torture they endure is a test orchestrated by Division. Percy, Michael and Amanda watch as Alex is tortured, but Alex, defying all anticipation, manages to escape and she contacts Nikita for help, but before she can get to Alex, Michael arrives to reveal the test and bring her back to Division. Meanwhile, as Owen begins to trust Nikita in her hideout, he reveals that he was the "cleaner" who killed Daniel Monroe. Owen later escapes, insisting on fighting Division on his own, and recovers the black box he had hidden in the previous episode. There are also flashbacks of Nikita helping Alex, and trying to gain her trust.
7	7	"The Recruit"	Eagle Egilsson	Amanda Segel	October 28, 2010	3X6257	2.48
Alex alerts Nikita that Division has activated a low-level recruit named Sara, who is sent out in the field to stop an eco-terrorist group; Nikita realizes Division is using Sara for a suicide mission, and is unknowingly implanted with a bomb. Nikita manages to sabotage the operation and convince Sara that Division wants her dead; she plans a new identity for Sara. Meanwhile, another recruit Robbie "graduates" to a guard rather than a field agent that he was hoping for. When Michael and a team find Nikita and Sara, they are forced to be recalled and allow the two to escape after Robbie goes on a rampage in Division for being denied to become an agent. Alex stops him, and though he is later declared dead, it is revealed that Division is keeping him alive to become a cleaner.
8	8	"Phoenix"	David M. Barrett	Jim Barnes	November 4, 2010	3X6258	2.41
Nikita fails to stop Thom from assassinating Anna Harcourt, the intern and mistress of a U.S. Senator. Thom later graduates to an agent. Nikita later realizes the killing may have been justified after she is captured by a couple masquerading as her parents. They and Harcourt are agents for Gogol, an organization apparently more dangerous than Division. Nikita awakens to find herself infected with a toxin that would liquify her stomach within 12 hours, and she would only be cured if she assassinates the Senator. Fortunately Alex steals the antidote and plants it on Thom; Nikita knocks him out while protecting the Senator, and takes the antidote. The leader of Gogol, Ari Tasarov, later asks Nikita to join them and stop Division together, but she refuses.
9	9	"One Way"	Ken Fink	Albert Kim	November 11, 2010	3X6259	2.33
Michael is sent on an unofficial mission to Tashkent, Uzbekistan to kill Kasim Tariq, the terrorist responsible for killing his family. Nikita arrives to assist Michael in the revenge mission. When Percy learns of this, he botches the operation by sending a team of agents, which leads to Kasim kidnapping Michael. Nikita eventually finds him, but Kasim has disappeared. He learns Kasim is going to board a flight to Yemen, but when he tries to fulfill his revenge, Nikita, knowing Michael will die in the process and wants to save him, alerts the airport authorities to apprehend him. Meanwhile, Alex nearly blows her cover when she is caught snooping through medical files to obtain Michael's transmitter frequency. Alex blackmails Jaden into helping her. In the end, Michael returns to Division, and tells Percy he should have never trusted Nikita in the first place.
10	10	"Dark Matter"	Danny Cannon	Carlos Coto	December 2, 2010	3X6260	2.30
Owen asks Nikita for help; using information from a black box, he leaked to the press that Division set up an assassination of Chilean presidential candidate Andre Quintano, in an attempt to find the other black boxes, but at the same time to save CIA analyst Ryan Fletcher, who has been framed and captured by angered mercenaries. The duo travel to Chile and rescue him moments before he is to be executed. However, they soon find themselves surrounded by Michael's team. While running away from them, the three are arrested by the United States Army. On the way back to the States, Nikita and Owen tell Fletcher about Division, and give him a memory stick before Fletcher arranges the two's escape. Meanwhile, Jaden has decided to focus on spying on Alex. Percy asks Birkhoff to team up with Division's head engineer so the black boxes can be activated through wi-fi. The engineer is then killed by Percy, which Alex witnesses by spying through the air vent. What she does find is the location of another box: London, England. Nikita later destroys Owen's black box and vows to do the same to the others.
11	11	"All the Way"	Terrence O'Hara	Craig Silverstein	December 9, 2010	3X6261	2.29
Alex is nervous upon learning she will be tasked to assassinate the leader of a crime syndicate named Zoman, so she can graduate to a field agent. Nikita decides to help her, but Alex insists she can do the kill herself. Birkhoff discovers the shell program used by Nikita to make contact with her operative inside. During the operation, Alex cannot bring herself to kill Zoman, Nikita intervenes while Thom kills Zoman. Realising Alex may die because of her failure, Nikita allows Alex to capture her so they can both escape afterwards. While Amanda interrogates Nikita, trying to make her reveal the identity of the mole and the location of the black box she has in her possession (which was destroyed at the end of the previous episode), Alex plants explosives as a diversion. However, Thom discovers she is the mole. After the explosives detonate, Alex fights with Thom and accidentally kills him. Nikita tries to take Alex, but she stays behind and frames Thom as the mole. After all potential escape routes are closed off following Nikita's escape, Percy promotes Alex to field agent.
12	12	"Free"	Jonathan Glassner	Kalinda Vazquez	January 27, 2011	3X6262	2.62
Following her promotion Alex is moved into an apartment with a cover job and identity, and is granted more freedom. Over the course of the episode she finds herself bonding to neighbor Nathan Colville. After meeting with Alex, Nikita realizes Division placed a kill chip inside her head. Nikita appoints Ryan for help by capturing Birkhoff in order to hack into his laptop. However, the encryption is nearly impossible to hack into. The two trick Birkhoff into hacking into a Blu-ray player, allowing them to know his password so Nikita can clone Alex's tracking signal. She narrowly succeeds as Michael enters to return Birkhoff. As a result Ryan is demoted, though Nikita promises that she will make up for it. To make it seem as if Nikita did something to Birkhoff's laptop, Alex posts a propaganda video recorded by Nikita to everyone at Division.
13	13	"Coup de Grace"	Nathan Hope	Albert Kim	February 3, 2011	3X6263	2.40
Alex warns Nikita that she is to be part of a team to assassinate Prince of Georgia Erik Mukhran at a museum gala. Nikita arrives at the gala beforehand to evacuate him, but is betrayed by Mukhran's wife, Princess Kristina Gruzinsky, who contacted Division to kill her husband. Nikita escapes and saves the Prince as Alex's team arrive. Mukhran reveals that he suspects his wife of planning to kill him, as he is trying to give up the throne after falling in love with another woman, Leela. When Kristina learns of this, Division holds her hostage unless Mukhran turns himself in. Thanks to Alex's quick thinking, Leela escapes with Mukhran, as does Nikita. Michael's team, disguised as FBI agents, storms the gala to "arrest" the gunmen. Afterwards, Michael becomes suspicious of Alex possibly working with Nikita after reviewing security footage of the event.
14	14	"The Next Seduction"	David Solomon	Carlos Coto	February 10, 2011	3X6264	1.89
Nikita goes to Quebec to pose as Josephine, a cover of hers during Division to reunite with Emil Voss, a man Division forced her to have a relationship with. She is running on a tip from Ryan, who was ignored by his superiors, that Voss is going to sell a dirty bomb. However, it is revealed Voss is trying to defect but Gogol are trying to stop him and obtain the weapon. Nikita and Voss successfully evade Gogol in smuggling the bomb to the States, but Nikita later learns that Division has set up the operation to take out Nikita and Ryan and get the bomb themselves; Voss is also killed. When Division is about to take off with the bomb, Gogol agents arrive, though Nikita outsmarts both parties and has Ryan deliver the bomb to the CIA, which results in a promotion to be allowed more access. Meanwhile, Michael interferes with Alex's growing feelings with Nathan, but by the end of the episode she and Nathan start kissing.
15	15	"Alexandra"	Ken Fink	Andrew Colville	February 17, 2011	3X6265	2.10
Alex runs into an old friend from her past, Irina. When she tries to help her, Alex is kidnapped by Vlad, the sex trafficker who captured Alex after her father's death. Vlad attempts to force Alex (which includes tempting her back to drugs) into confessing she is the daughter of Nikolai Udinov, a Russian billionaire who was killed by Division. Meanwhile, Michael reluctantly works with Nikita to save Alex, while at the same time Nikita does not expose her secret. The two find the warehouse where Vlad is holding a number of sex slaves. During the attack, Irina helps Alex escape; Alex later confesses to Vlad she is in fact Udinov's daughter and "rewards" him by killing him. Michael later returns Alex to Division to begin her withdrawal, however Amanda uses the opportunity to ask her a few questions about her past.
16	16	"Echoes"	Nick Copus	Kristen Reidel	February 24, 2011	3X6266	2.14
Amanda places Alex in a drug-induced hallucination to learn more about her past. Nikita believes Alex is in danger and organizes to smuggle her out of the country. In the hallucination, Alex tries to break out of Division with her younger self, while at the same time running away from an unknown female enemy. It is eventually revealed that Alex was running away from herself in a possible future where she takes control of her father's empire. Before she could reveal that to Amanda, Michael puts a halt to the test, claiming she was revisiting the time she killed Thom. Despite this Amanda recommends to Percy that he "cancel" her. Meanwhile, Michael, with Birkhoff's help, learns that Nikita is taking residence in an abandoned mansion that used to belong to a business Nikita assassinated while working in Division. He later visits her and aims a shotgun at her.
17	17	"Covenant"	Eagle Egilsson	Jim Barnes	April 7, 2011	3X6267	1.82
Michael threatens to expose Alex's cover to Percy if Nikita does not help him find Kasim Tariq within 24 hours. She is forced to work with Gogol in St. Petersburg, Russia to lure him out by destroying a heroin shipment in Chechnya. She captures Kasim and betrays Gogol again. She and Michael agree to meet at the house the two spent time undercover five years ago. After Michael kills Kasim's back-up, Kasim reveals that he used to work with Division, and before defecting to Al Qaeda, was ordered to kill Michael, by Percy. After Kasim is killed, Michael decides to defect to Nikita's side in secret and together plan to find the black boxes, then kill Percy. The episode finishes with the two kissing passionately.
18	18	"Into the Dark"	Jeffrey Hunt	Albert Kim	April 14, 2011	3X6268	2.21
Nikita and Owen go to London to retrieve one of Division's black boxes and its guardian. Nikita learns that Owen is taking medication that Division discontinued years ago because of its psychological effects to the guardians. Nikita notices Owen is become increasingly obsessed with finding the black box and release its contents to the public, Nikita disagrees and he turns on her. Percy orders Michael to send a team to track and kill the two. Owen leads the team and the guardian to the church where he kills the opponents before Michael and Nikita arrive to destroy the black box and knock Owen out. When he awakens, he decides to stop taking his medication and apologises for killing Daniel. Meanwhile, Amanda overhears Jaden arguing with Alex about the escape tunnels so she hooks Alex up to a lie detector to get the truth out of her once and for all. At first caught on a lie, Alex manages to fool the machine by telling Amanda she was covering for Thom. However, Amanda still has trouble believing her, leading Nikita to hasten Alex's escape plan.
19	19	"Girl's Best Friend"	Robert Lieberman	Carlos Coto	April 21, 2011	3X6269	2.01
Alex and Jaden are selected to take part on a mission to Geneva, Switzerland to stop Kalume Ungara, the playboy son of a foreign president from selling a newly developed nerve toxin to a potential terrorist group. Alex, Michael and Nikita agree to fake her death during the mission to ensure her escape from Division. During the mission, Alex overhears Ungara talk with a customer who intends to use the toxin, which is in resin form and disguised as diamonds, against a developing nations summit; Nikita tasks herself with stopping the attack while Alex attempts to destroy the lab. However, Jaden is exposed and taken to the lab, prompting Alex to break up her plan of faking her death and save Jaden, before destroying the lab. After they return to Division, Jaden hands over the nerve toxin to Percy, who promotes her to an agent.
20	20	"Glass Houses"	Ralph Hemecker	Kalinda Vazquez	April 28, 2011	3X6270	1.72
Frustrated that Nikita continues to intercept his black boxes, Percy sends Michael to check on one of the boxes and the guardian attached to it named Dana Winters (Christina Moses) in a Pennsylvania town. Nikita arrives to find Dana living with a fiance and his son. Michael is forced to report this to Percy, who sends a team to intercept. Nikita gets to the black box but finds herself surrounded by Michael's team. When Dana sees the agents threaten her stepson to be, she kills the Division agents for his safety, and she escapes with her family. Alex reveals to Nathan who she is so they can run away together, but he does not believe her, when Jaden realizes she told him, Jaden attempts to call it in, but Alex fights her, and Nathan shoots Jaden to death. When she reports the shooting to Division, Amanda reveals she planted a listening chip on her ear, hearing a conversation between Alex and Nikita. Amanda pins her down and admits she knows Alex's past.
21	21	"Betrayals"	Eagle Egilsson	Andrew Colville	May 5, 2011	3X6271	2.00
After Michael learns that Percy has ordered Division to kill anyone who could decrypt the black boxes, he sends Nikita in to save the last person on the list: a CIA cryptographer named Malcolm Mitchell. Nikita saves Malcolm from Division assassins and takes him to Ryan for protection. Meanwhile, Percy learns Alex is the mole. Later, Percy shows Alex visual and audio evidence that it was Nikita who killed her father. Nikita asks Michael to check on her; when Percy orders him to kill Alex, Michael turns the gun on him, but is stunned when he tries to fire it. Percy reveals that he is several steps ahead of them, even allowing Nikita to have the small victories to ambush her in the end. Percy allows the release of Alex to apprehend Nikita, but under monitoring in case she deviates from the plan. When Alex meets Nikita, Alex asks her if she killed her dad. When Nikita does not answer the question, Alex shoots her.
22	22	"Pandora"	Ken Fink	Craig Silverstein	May 12, 2011	3X6272	1.94
Alex doses Nikita with a toxin that feigns death. While talking to members of Oversight, Percy reveals his plan to take over the CIA by letting Malcolm and Fletcher hack into the black box, which would unleash a nerve toxin, (Note: First introduced in "Girl's Best Friend".) killing them and the CIA's director; later, Division will blame the attack on Nikita. Nikita however, awakens and injures cleaner Roan by throwing acid to his face. At Langley, she saves the CIA director, Malcolm and Fletcher. After she is taken into custody, Fletcher helps her escape. Meanwhile, Alex is brought back to Amanda, who kills her with the kill chip. She then revives her and lets her go free, but warns her not to return to Nikita. Birkhoff releases Michael and they decrypt a black box, before Michael escapes. Nikita returns to her loft to destroy it, but Alex returns just to get her new identity ready. The loft is destroyed when Division agents storm it. Nikita and Alex go their separate ways, but Alex is captured again. She is recruited by Amanda and Oversight to stop Nikita from releasing the black box; in return, they will help her find the man who ordered her family's death.

== Production and release ==
During February and March 2010, Maggie Q, Shane West, Lyndsy Fonseca, Xander Berkeley, Tiffany Hines, Melinda Clarke, Aaron Stanford and Ashton Holmes were all cast to star in Nikita. Devon Sawa was cast in a recurring role as Owen Elliot. Former president and chairman of Marvel Comics Stan Lee made a cameo appearance in the episode "The Guardian" after he and lead actress Q met at the 2011 San Diego Comic-Con. In October 2010, Noah Bean gained a recurring role as Ryan Fletcher.

While presenting its 2010–11 season schedule on May 21, 2010, The CW officially confirmed the pick-up of the series and announced its intention to air Nikita after The Vampire Diaries on Thursday nights. The pilot episode premiered on September 9, 2010, which drew 3.6 million viewers on its initial broadcast. This rating became The CW's best rating of all-time on Thursdays among women.

In October, 2010, the show was picked up for a full season, which would total 22 episodes. The CW have admitted they took gambles this year but said they were "thrilled that [it] paid off for us." The season finale aired on May 12, 2011, and was seen by 1.95 million viewers. The first season averaged 2.90 million viewers and a 1.1 18–49 rating per episode, ranking 210th in the television season.

== Plot ==
The first season begins with Alex being brought to Division from Death row after a deliberately botched robbery attempt. While inside Division, Alex forges a friendship with Thom, a recruit who has nearly achieved agent-status. Jaden, another recruit, immediately becomes antagonistic towards Alex. Alex also meets Percy, Division's leader, and Michael, Nikita's former mentor and romantic interest, who trains the recruits.

Alex repeatedly passes Nikita information about Division's operations and assassination attempts, allowing Nikita the opportunity to intercept them. Not every mission goes as planned, however, and Nikita has frequent run-ins with her former mentor, Michael. Michael has been told by Percy to kill Nikita on sight, although he frequently shows mild affection towards her by letting her go.

Division quickly catches on that there is a mole in their organization, and begins searching for him/her. In the meantime they find out that Birkhoff, the computers expert, has a transmitter planted in his tooth, presumably put there by Nikita. For her graduation test from Division, Alex is tasked with killing the leader of a crime syndicate, but her mission goes wrong. To save Alex from being "cleaned" by Division (their term for eliminating agents), Nikita allows Alex to bring her to Division as her "captive," although they plan to escape together afterwards. While Nikita is interrogated by Amanda, Alex sets off explosives to distract everyone. Nikita is able to escape. During the chaos, Thom realizes Alex is the mole. They fight, and Alex accidentally shoots Thom. Grieving, she stays with him instead of escaping with Nikita, and places evidence on his body to make him look like the mole. Later, she is promoted to Field Agent.

Now able to live in the outside world, Alex meets her next door neighbor named Nathan, who she forms a relationship with. Nikita works with Ryan Fletcher, a CIA analyst who agrees to help Nikita after she saves his life, and Owen Elliot, a former Division agent who killed Nikita's fiancé, to try to find Division's black boxes, which keep a record of all of their former operations. The boxes are protected by Guardians, special agents designated to protect each box. Owen has a black box, which Nikita destroys. She believes destroying the boxes will remove any insurance Division may have. She also faces a new enemy in the form of GOGOL, a Russian criminal organisation and spin-off from Division, led by Ari Tasarov, which is trying to take over from Division.

Michael begins to suspect Alex, and after a thorough search, finds Nikita's hideout. Nikita helps Michael to find Kasim Tariq, the man who murdered his wife and daughter. Discovering that Tariq was a former Division agent and was told by Percy to kill his family, Michael turns against Division and begins to work with Nikita. They also begin a relationship. With Michael's help, Nikita is able to find and destroy the second black box.

Nikita makes plans for Alex to escape Division because her cover has become compromised, but Alex saves Jaden's life during a mission, changing the plan. After the mission, Jaden secretly gives a supposedly-destroyed nerve toxin to Percy, who then promotes her to Agent status.

Alex tells Nathan who she is and tries to get him to run away with her, but Jaden finds out. When she attempts to call in Alex's betrayal, she and Alex fight, and Nathan ends up shooting Jaden. Amanda finds out through Jaden's cochlear implant that Alex is the mole. Percy uses this information to draw Nikita into a trap, by telling Alex that it was Nikita who killed her parents. He also plans to take over the CIA by having its director, Malcolm, a CIA cryptographer, and Fletcher to be killed when they hack into the next black box. However, Alex saves Nikita by using a toxin to feign her death, and Nikita manages to save the CIA members from Percy's plan. Amanda pretends to let Alex go so she can pursue a new life, warning her to stay away from Nikita. After Alex disobeys Amanda's order, she is recaptured on the orders of Oversight (the group of high officials who sanction Division). Oversight and Amanda recruit Alex to stop Nikita from releasing the black box. In return, Alex will receive information about who killed her father.

== Accolades ==
The first season of Nikita received a total of seven awards nominations. In 2010, the episode "Pilot" received a nomination in the category "Best Cinematography in Episodic TV Series" in the American Society of Cinematographers. The following year, the series received a nomination for "Favorite TV Drama" in the 37th People's Choice Awards and nominations for Maggie Q and Lyndsy Fonseca performances in the 2011 Teen Choice Awards. Shane West was awarded "Choice TV Actor Action" in the ceremony. The season finale received a Primetime Emmy Awards nomination for Outstanding Sound Editing for a Series, which result is still pending.

== Media release ==
The first season of Nikita, distributed by Warner Bros. on DVD and Blu-ray, features all the 22 episodes. It also includes deleted scenes, "Inside Division, Part 1: The New Nikita", "Inside Division, Part 2: Executing an Episode", "Profiling Nikita, Alex, Percy & Michael", audio commentaries and a gag reel as bonus features. The box-set was released on August 30, 2011, in North America, and was released on September 19, 2011, in Europe and October 26, 2011, in Australia.

In Japan, Itano Tomomi, pop singer and member of the girl group AKB48, was chosen as the image girl for the DVD release of Nikita by appearing in commercials to promote the product.
