= Beyond the Break =

American TV series

- Created by: Michael D. Jacobs; David Brookwell; Sean McNamara
- Starring: Natalie Ramsey; Sonya Balmores; Tiffany Hines; Suzie Pollard; David Chokachi; Ross Thomas; Adam T. Brooks
- Country of origin: United States
- Original language: English
- No. of seasons: 3
- No. of episodes: 34

Production
- Executive producers: Matt Dearborn; David Brookwell; Sean McNamara; Pixie Wespiser; Fernando Szew; Josh Greene; Michael D. Jacobs
- Running time: 22–24 minutes
- Production companies: Brookwell McNamara Entertainment; MarVista Entertainment; TalkStory Productions (seasons 1–2); Island Film Group (season 3)

Original release
- Network: The N (Noggin)
- Release: June 2, 2006 – June 25, 2009

Beyond the Break is an American drama television series about four women who join a competitive surfing circuit. It is set in Hawaii. The show was created by Michael D. Jacobs, David Brookwell and Sean McNamara. It aired on Noggin's teen programming block, The N. The series premiered on June 2, 2006, and aired its final episode on June 25, 2009.

== Synopsis ==
The series focuses on four women in the sport of professional surfing. Birdie Scott (Tiffany Hines), Lacey Farmer (Natalie Ramsey), Dawn Preston (Suzie Pollard), and Kai Kealoha (Sonya Balmores) must overcome their differences in order to capture surf stardom. David Chokachi, Baywatch star, also stars as the girls' surfing instructor. Bailey Reese (Ross Thomas) and his sidekick Shoe (Jason Tam) round out the cast as two male surfers who have their eyes on Birdie and Dawn. Michael Copon has a recurring role as both Kai and Lacey's love interest.

== Cast ==
=== Main ===
- Natalie Ramsey as Lacey Farmer
- Sonya Balmores as Kai Kealoha
- Tiffany Hines as Birdie Scott
- Suzie Pollard as Dawn Preston
- David Chokachi as Justin Healy
- Ross Thomas as Bailey Reese
- Adam T. Brooks as DJ Reese (season 3)

=== Recurring and notable guests ===
- Jesse Williams as Eric Medina (8 episodes)
- Michael Copon as Vin Keahi
- Jason Tam as Shoe
- Olivia Munn as Mily Acuna
- Kim Kardashian as Elle (4 episodes)
- Aubrey Graham as himself
- Scott Caudill as Dwayne/Duane, the biker (2 episodes)

== Production and broadcast ==
The show debuted in June 2006. Of the first 20 episodes filmed, the first 10 were shown as Season 1, while the following 10 aired subsequently as Season 2. The N Soundtrack, released in 2006, contains songs from the series.

The third and final season of Beyond the Break, consisting of 14 episodes, first aired on the Canadian network Razer. After a two-year hiatus, it premiered in the United States on June 8, 2009 on The N. The series was briefly rerun in July 2012 on TeenNick, which promoted it as a "summer series".

== Episodes ==
=== Series overview ===
| Season | Episodes | Originally released | |
| Season | Episodes | First released | Last released |
|---|---|---|---|
| 1 | 10 | June 2, 2006 | July 28, 2006 |
| 2 | 10 | January 5, 2007 | March 23, 2007 |
| 3 | 14 | June 8, 2009 | June 25, 2009 |

=== Season 1 (2006) ===
| No. overall | No. in season | Title | Directed by | Written by | Original release date | Prod. code |
|---|---|---|---|---|---|---|
| 1 | 1 | "Charging It, Part 1" | Sean McNamara | Sean McNamara, David Brookwell & Michael D. Jacobs | June 2, 2006 | 101 |
Lacey Farmer ditches her dysfunctional family and runs away to Hawaii to win a spot on the WaveSync pro surfing team. But it's not as easy as she thinks. To be continued...
| 2 | 2 | "Charging It, Part 2" | Sean McNamara | Sean McNamara, David Brookwell & Michael D. Jacobs | June 2, 2006 | 102 |
Lacey Farmer ditches her dysfunctional family and runs away to Hawaii to win a spot on the WaveSync pro surfing team. But when Lacey finds out that it's not as easy as she thought, she ends up on the street, starving and with nowhere to go.
| 3 | 3 | "Sleeping with the Enemy" | Sean McNamara | Sarah Watson | June 9, 2006 | 103 |
While Lacey tries to scrape together the entry fee for a surfing contest, Kai thinks her old friends might be sabotaging her new life.
| 4 | 4 | "The First Test" | Sean McNamara | Bernie Ancheta | June 16, 2006 | 104 |
The WaveSync girls' first competition tests whether they've got what it takes, in the water and inside themselves.
| 5 | 5 | "Wing Chicks" | David Brookwell | Matt Dearborn | June 23, 2006 | 105 |
Kai's lifelong crush has his eyes on Lacey, while a hot GI wanders into Birdie's life.
| 6 | 6 | "Party Wave" | David Brookwell | Bernie Ancheta & Sarah Watson | June 30, 2006 | 106 |
The team has to introduce themselves to the WaveSync suits at a corporate party, but Dawn gets the party started early when she meets one of the moneymen in his hotel room.
| 7 | 7 | "Vin, Lose or Draw" | Rachel Feldman | Bernie Ancheta | July 7, 2006 | 107 |
Kai admits to Lacey that she loves Vin. Lacey has been hooking up with him on the beach.
| 8 | 8 | "The Big Hit" | Rachel Feldman | Sarah Watson | July 14, 2006 | 108 |
When Kai complains to her friends about Lacey and Vin, Mily and Lani decide to teach the haole girl a lesson in local etiquette.
| 9 | 9 | "No Guts, No Glory" | Melanie Mayron | Paula Yoo, Sarah Watson & Bernie Ancheta | July 21, 2006 | 109 |
While Lacey tries to cope with her pain, Kai tries to cope with the guilt of what her friends did to her teammate.
| 10 | 10 | "Birds and the Bees" | Melanie Mayron | Matt Dearborn | July 28, 2006 | 110 |
Birdie has Marcus and Bailey competing over her, Dawn continues trying to get a date for Shoe, and Kai shows her feelings for Vin.

=== Season 2 (2007) ===
| No. overall | No. in season | Title | Directed by | Written by | Original release date | Prod. code |
|---|---|---|---|---|---|---|
| 11 | 1 | "Oceans Eleven" | Rachel Feldman | Sarah Watson | January 5, 2007 | 201 |
Birdie can't stand the thought of Marcus leaving, so she pushes him away even faster; Kai tries to hide her guilt over hurting Lacey by becoming fully addicted to the prescription pills-which worry her friends.
| 12 | 2 | "The Sweaty Party" | Melanie Mayron | David Brookwell | January 5, 2007 | 202 |
Birdie only has a few hours before Marcus ships out for Iraq, just enough time to figure out whether or not she wants to spend the rest of her life with him; Kai's plan to fix her life with pain pills backfires, and the only way she can take control is to confess the truth she's been hiding from Lacey.
| 13 | 3 | "What Are You Doing Here?" | Melanie Mayron | Sean McNamara & Jeff Phillips | January 12, 2007 | 203 |
Lacey's mom suddenly walks back into her life and decides to make it her own also getting a job there; Dawn tries to go behind her the teammates backs by deciding she wants to fill the spot in the Fiji Open but it backfires; While Shoe asks Bailey to go on as a third wheel but when Bailey see Birrdie, he turns it into a double date and with Shoe's new friend, Erin, they draw a connection with a kiss.
| 14 | 4 | "Fiji Open" | David Brookwell | Jeff Phillips | January 19, 2007 | 204 |
Lacey's mom seems like she's settling in for good, so Lacey tries to force her out, and ends up pushing herself out the door too. Meanwhile, Kai hunts for her inner-agro as she faces down Dawn in a surf-off to win a spot in the Fiji Open.
| 15 | 5 | "Running Scared" | David Brookwell | Bernie Ancheta & Sarah Watson | January 26, 2007 | 205 |
Lacey won't give in to her mom, even if it means leaving WaveSync forever. While Dawn won't give in to Dale and his decision about Kai-and it just might mean leaving WaveSync forever.
| 16 | 6 | "Waving Goodbye" | Matt Dearborn | Matt Dearborn | February 16, 2007 | 206 |
Dawn can't stand just being the pretty blonde face of WaveSync anymore – she wants to be recognized for her skills. So she walks out the door, but it costs her more than just a place to crash. Meanwhile, Lacey's just patched things up with her mom, and they're already falling apart.
| 17 | 7 | "Walking the Plankton" | Matt Dearborn | Matt Dearborn | February 23, 2007 | 207 |
Dawn's on her own and hung out to dry when her dad cuts off her cash flow.
| 18 | 8 | "Out of Sync" | Sean McNamara | Pamela Wallace | March 2, 2007 | 208 |
Dawn turns to Bailey for comfort, and he's ready to give her all the comfort she can take; While Kai may be spreading herself too thin, when she makes connections with someone other than Vin.
| 19 | 9 | "One Good Ride" | Sean McNamara | Bernie Ancheta & Sarah Watson | March 16, 2007 | 209 |
Dawn's out for blood when she and Kai hit the waves for a rematch. But is Dawn taking on Kai, or the memory of her dad? Meanwhile, WaveSync sabotages Kai's relationship with Vin (unintentionally), and Lacey sabotages Justin's relationship with his new girlfriend (totally intentionally).
| 20 | 10 | "Beyond the Break" | Sean McNamara | Sean McNamara | March 23, 2007 | 210 |
More than anything, Dawn needs WaveSync to take her back. She comes looking for forgiveness, but the girls aren't so ready to forgive. Meanwhile, Kai prepares to head out for her summer tour wondering where things are headed with Vin.

=== Season 3 (2009) ===
| No. overall | No. in season | Title | Directed by | Written by | Original release date | Prod. code |
|---|---|---|---|---|---|---|
| 21 | 1 | "To Tell the Truth" | Sheldon Larry | Sean McNamara | June 8, 2009 | 301 |
Kai and Bailey return from the summer tour, and Kai becomes jealous when she sees some of Vin's paintings of a naked girl. Dale is replaced by Liz as the boss of WaveSync. Bailey's brother DJ makes a surprising visit.
| 22 | 2 | "The Money" | Sheldon Larry | Stephanie Ripps | June 8, 2009 | 302 |
After seeing DJ with thousands of dollars, Dawn becomes suspicious and tells Bailey. Lacey tries to avoid the livingroom when a webcam is installed.
| 23 | 3 | "White Lies" | Kevin Inch | Sean McNamara | June 9, 2009 | 303 |
Kai sets out to make Vin jealous. Liz's latest marketing strategy ends up upsetting Lacey. Dawn convinces Bailey to not turn his back on DJ.
| 24 | 4 | "Blame It on the Wayne" | Kevin Inch | Elisa Delson & Laura Gutin | June 10, 2009 | 304 |
Liz's father arrives to check on WaveSync's progress -- at the worst possible time.
| 25 | 5 | "A Shoulder to Spy On" | Paul Hoen | Bernie Ancheta | June 11, 2009 | 305 |
As the team faces the possibility of losing the WaveSync house, Lacey and DJ run away from their problems and into each other's arms.
| 26 | 6 | "House of Cards" | Paul Hoen | David Brookwell & Matt Dearborn | June 15, 2009 | 306 |
The team faces the possibility of losing the WaveSync house; Lacey and DJ run away from their problems and into each other's arms.
| 27 | 7 | "Lost & Found" | Sean McNamara | Sean McNamara | June 16, 2009 | 307 |
Bailey tries to purge himself of all his past flings at a chance for a real relationship. Lacey and DJ write to each other during DJ's absence. Wavesync works with the Surfrider Foundation. Justin and Liz's Fire begins to spark. Vin and Kai try to talk. Dawn realizes that she has more in common with Bailey than she thinks. Birdie shows why she has the name. Vin's girlfriend realizes that Kai isn't as meek as she thinks. Shoe introduces Sofia to Justin
| 28 | 8 | "One "Elle" of a Party" | Carol Banker | Sean McNamara | June 17, 2009 | 308 |
Justin and Dawn are stranded in the ocean, but the team is too busy with the benefit party to notice. Aubrey Graham guest stars.
| 29 | 9 | "Cast Away" | Paul Hoen | Bernie Ancheta | June 18, 2009 | 309 |
It's the day after the Party and Justin and Dawn are nowhere to be found, and with a completely trashed Wavesync Ski just reported off the coast everyone is worried.
| 30 | 10 | "Bailed" | Paul Hoen | Stephanie Ripps | June 22, 2009 | 310 |
DJ wants to stay in Hawaii with Bailey for Lacey., despite the drug deals he went through and the probation and aftermath he has to deal with now. Dawn starts to feel different about her relationship with Bailey and after talking to Justin breaks off their relationship. Eric finally gets Birdie to go out on a date with him, breaking the promise to herself that she would never go out with a cop. DJ goes to School with Lacey and Kai. Kai talks to her uncle, the football coach on DJ's behalf and that mixed with DJ's throwing ability gets him on the team as #9.Denise does not hold back her disdain for Lacey, or her attraction for DJ. Birdie and Kai Walk-in on Eric with another woman at a club. Bailey Gives DJ everything and leaves Waianae.
| 31 | 11 | "All Riled Up" | Paul Schneider | Gary Rosen & Holly Goldberg Sloan | June 23, 2009 | 311 |
Kai's little sister, Malia, takes a shine to Dawn, and Kai doesn't like that. Rochelle Ballard appears as herself. Birdie is starting think she's in over her head. Justin and Liz are "checking the books", like a team now. Liz's godsister, Riley Westlake, comes for a visit but she's no angel.
| 32 | 12 | "Would I Lie to You" | Paul Hoen | Sean McNamara | June 24, 2009 | 312 |
Everyone's in for a big Sur...prise! Happy Birthday to me. It's Lacey's birthday and she's all but all alone. DJ is at extra football practices or so he says. Birdie talks to Liz about the contemplation of Pity dating. Kai forbids Dawn from seeing Malia, before she finds out about Dawn giving her a condom. Justin plays the wise elder. Riley is starting to show her true colors more and more as she continually tries to vie for a spot on the wavesync roster. Eric and Birdie finally have "the talk."
| 33 | 13 | "Worked" | Kevin Inch | Sean McNamara | June 25, 2009 | 313 |
Justin's loyalty is tested when Liz asks him to kick off one of the wavesync girls in order to let Riley become a wavesync girl.
| 34 | 14 | "Wronged" | Kevin Inch | Matt Dearborn & Bernie Ancheta | June 25, 2009 | 314 |
The episode ends with Riley framing Lacey of stealing her money by planting it inside her drawer. Riley then tells that her money is missing in which they all suspect Lacey. At Prom Lacey has the time of her life and spends the night with her boyfriend and returns to find out that she will not be going to Australia and that is replaced by Riley only to infuriate Lacey as they drive off without her.
