= Natalie Ramsey =

American actress

- Born: October 10, 1975 (age 51); Milton, Massachusetts
- Occupation: Television actress

Natalie Ramsey (born October 10, 1975) is a television actress. Her passion for surfing led her to star in the television series Beyond the Break as Lacey Farmer. She has also starred in Cruel Intentions 3, Sandy in Cherry Falls, Pleasantville, and Children of the Corn 666: Isaac's Return playing Hanna Martin.

== Filmography ==
Film roles
Year	Title	Role	Notes
1998	Confessions of a Sexist Pig	Julia	
1998	Pleasantville	Mary Sue Parker	
1999	The Other Sister	Body Shot Girl	
1999	Children of the Corn 666: Isaac's Return	Hannah Martin	Direct-to-video film
2000	Cherry Falls	Sandy	
2002	Local Boys	Natalie	
2004	Cruel Intentions 3	Sheila	Direct-to-video film

Television roles
Year	Title	Role	Notes
1997	Party of Five	Snotty Girl	Episode: "What a Drag"
1997	Pacific Blue	Vicki Miller	Episode: "Only in America"
1998	USA High	Christine	Episode: "Lazz's High Noon"
1998	Sports Theater with Shaquille O'Neal	Jen Colter	Episode: "Broken Record"
1999	Days of Our Lives	Jan Spears	2 episodes
1999–2000	Get Real	Jody Garrow	Main role
2000	Opposite Sex	Heidi	Episode: "The Drug Episode"
2001	Hollywood 7	Annie	Episode: "Dosh"
2001	Boston Public	Girl in Danny's class	Episode: "Chapter Twenty-Three"
2001	Signs of Life	Maria	Unsold TV pilot
2002	7th Heaven	Patty-Mary Kinkirk	Episode: "Letting Go"
2006–2009	Beyond the Break	Lacey Farmer	Main role
