= Shark Swarm =

- DVD cover
- Genre: Horror, Thriller
- Written by: Matthew Chernov; David Rosiak
- Directed by: James A. Contner
- Starring: Daryl Hannah; John Schneider; Armand Assante
- Theme music composer: Nathan Furst
- Country of origin: United States
- Original language: English

Production
- Producers: Kyle Clark; Patsy Fitzgerald; Stephen Niver
- Cinematography: Dane Peterson
- Editor: Craig Bassett
- Running time: 158 minutes

Original release
- Network: Syfy
- Release: May 25, 2008

Shark Swarm is an American film created by RHI Entertainment. It premiered on Syfy on May 25, 2008. Directed by James A. Contner and written by Matthew Chernov and David Rosiak, the film stars Daryl Hannah, John Schneider and Armand Assante. It was released to generally unfavorable reviews. It is the eleventh film in the Maneater film series.

== Plot ==
Corporate real estate tycoon Hamilton Lux (Armand Assante) sets his sights on developing the quaint seaside town of Full Moon Bay, California into a prime getaway for the wealthy, but runs into some unexpected problems. Lifelong fisherman Daniel Wilder (John Schneider) and wife Brooke (Daryl Hannah) own property exactly where Lux wants to build high-priced condos, and are not planning to sell. Lux secretly laces the local waters with a toxin deadly to marine life, devastating the local fishing industry in an attempt to starve Daniel out. Alas, the toxin has a different effect on the area's sharks, drastically increasing their aggression and causing them to move in coordinated swarms. Without fish for them to feed on, shark attacks on humans rapidly increase. Lux uses media contacts to paint the attacks as random incidents. Daniel, his marine biologist brother, and a concerned E.P.A. agent must expose Lux's plan and rid the area of the chemically altered sharks before the town's entire population is devoured by hungry sharks.

== Cast ==
- Daryl Hannah as Brook Wilder
- John Schneider as Daniel Wilder
- Armand Assante as Hamilton Lux
- F. Murray Abraham as Professor Bill Girdler
- Roark Critchlow as Professor Phillip Wilder
- Heather McComb as Amy Zuckerman
- John Enos III as Kane Markus
- Tiffany Hines as Michelle
- Alan Fudge as Pastor Herman
- Gene Davis as Sheriff Dexter Murray (as Eugene Davis)
- Brent King as Clint Duran
- June Squibb as Bess Wilder
- Mimi Michaels as Kim Wilder
- Elisa Donovan as Brenda
- Jacleen Haber as Tia
- Darcy Rose Byrnes as Heather

== Critical reception ==
Shark Swarm has been widely panned.

== See also ==
- List of killer shark films
