= Get Real (American TV series) =

- Genre: Teen drama Comedy drama
- Created by: Clyde Phillips
- Starring: Jon Tenney; Debrah Farentino; Anne Hathaway; Christina Pickles; Eric Christian Olsen; Jesse Eisenberg; Scott Vickaryous
- Composer: Dennis McCarthy
- Country of origin: United States
- Original language: English
- No. of seasons: 1
- No. of episodes: 22 (2 unaired)

Production
- Executive producers: Robert Lloyd Lewis; Clyde Phillips; Pam Veasey
- Running time: 60 minutes
- Production companies: Clyde Phillips Productions; 20th Century Fox Television

Original release
- Network: Fox
- Release: September 8, 1999 – April 12, 2000

Get Real is an American teen comedy-drama television series that aired on the Fox Network and ran from September 1999 to April 2000. It follows the fictional Green family headed by parents Mitch and Mary and consisting of three teenagers – Meghan, Cameron, and Kenny. It stars Eric Christian Olsen, Jesse Eisenberg, Anne Hathaway, Debrah Farentino, and Jon Tenney. The series marked both Hathaway and Eisenberg's onscreen debuts.

== Premise ==
The series follows the dysfunctional Green family. Parents Mitch and Mary, who first became parents when they were teenagers, find their marriage has hit the skids. Oldest child Meghan is an achiever who is nominated for class valedictorian and is accepted to UC Berkeley, but she drops a bombshell on her parents when she announces she is foregoing college. Middle child Cameron is a slacker who upsets his mom by bringing girls to stay over for the night. Youngest child Kenny is awkward and a target of bullies. Living with the Greens is Mary's mom Elizabeth, who has taken up residence in their home after the death of her husband. Mitch comes from a Reform Jewish family. Mary comes from a Catholic family.

The Green kids periodically address the camera, a technique show creator Clyde Phillips employed in his previous teen series Parker Lewis Can't Lose. These asides to the audience are sometimes delivered in a sarcastic tone that references popular culture and other TV shows. In the pilot, Meghan comments to the audience, "I know what you're thinking. 'This is another one of those smart-ass shows where the kids talk to the audience' like on um, Dawson's Creek, which, actually come to think of it, I'm not even sure does voice-overs. See, personally I wouldn't be caught dead watching it because there is nothing more obnoxious than self-aware teens who know more about life's great mysteries than their parents. And don't worry, we're not gonna get all sturmy-eyed either like on My So-Called Life. Although, you know, that chick didn't do so bad for herself."

== Cast ==
- Jon Tenney as Mitch Green
- Debrah Farentino as Mary Green
- Eric Christian Olsen as Cameron Green
- Anne Hathaway as Meghan Green
- Jesse Eisenberg as Kenny Green
- Kyle Brent Gibson as Victor Castillo
- Natalie Ramsey as Jennell Hutchison
- Scott Vickaryous as Clay Forman
- Christina Pickles as Elizabeth Parker

== Episodes ==
No.	Title	Directed by	Written by	Original release date	Prod. code
1	"Pilot"	Scott Winant	Clyde Phillips	September 15, 1999	1ADD79
After fantasizing about an encounter with another man, Mary attempts to reignite her marriage with Mitch. Mitch's colleague at work (Peter Hermann) suggests he have an affair. Kenny has to face a school bully and tries to talk to the girl of his dreams (January Jones), but is dismayed to learn she is involved with Cameron. Meghan announces to the family she is not attending college as planned.
2	"Sexual Healing"	Larry Shaw	Clyde Phillips	September 22, 1999	1ADD01
Mitch and Mary go to a therapist who advises more intimacy, Meghan gets a navel ring and dates a 23-year-old (Jeremy Garrett), Cameron is suspended from school, and Rebecca (Taryn Manning) shows interest in Kenny.
3	"Passages"	Ken Fink	Tom Spezialy	September 29, 1999	1ADD02
Cameron starts to get serious about school, while Kenny's peeping escapades land him in counseling.
4	"Stay"	Larry Shaw	Clyde Phillips & Lon Diamond	October 13, 1999	1ADD03
Mitch gets some upsetting news about his best friend (Jay Thomas), which affects the whole Green family. Meghan gets mad at Cameron for ratting her out to Mary, who is planning an elaborate birthday party for a 7-year-old.
5	"Anatomy of a Rumor"	Ken Fink	Pam Veasey	October 20, 1999	1ADD04
Rumors spread at Truman High about Meghan being pregnant. Cameron makes a deal with Kenny in a bid to relax the school's skateboarding ban. A depressed Mitch decides on a career change.
6	"Performance Anxiety"	Bill D'Elia	Story by : Douglas Steinberg & Kevin Murphy; Teleplay by : Kevin Murphy	October 27, 1999	1ADD05
Mitch's loan officer turns out to be Mary's old high-school flame. Kenny is obsessed with the idea of having sex with Rebecca, while a lifelong dream of Cameron's is fulfilled when he takes up scuba diving lessons. Mary things Meghan is too tight with her English lit teacher Ms. LaSalle (Sydney Walsh).
7	"Prey"	Stephen Cragg	Wendy Battles & Tim Schlattmann	November 3, 1999	1ADD06
When Rebecca fails to show up for a beach date with Kenny, he sets his sights on another girl. Meghan is devastated by Dan's tryst with Ms. LaSalle.
8	"Big Numbers"	Richard Compton	Alan Cross	November 10, 1999	1ADD07
Meghan is intrigued by a transfer student. Mitch clashes with the new city project engineer (Kelly Rutherford) assigned to his firehouse rehab. Cam has his eye on the daughter of Victor's rich but overprotective uncle.
9	"Crime and Punishment"	David Grossman	Tara Butters & Michele Fazekas	November 17, 1999	1ADD08
Mitch and Mary deal with the news Mary is pregnant. Meghan defies her mother by attending a rave. Kenny tries to get someone to teach him how to drive.
10	"Denial"	Stephen Cragg	Tim Schlattmann & Wendy Battles	November 24, 1999	1ADD09
Meghan's torn between her desire for Clay (Scott Vickaryous) and her friendship with Amy (Alexandra Picatto). Mitch's colleague Laura surprises him with an expensive present. Kenny discovers that he's a natural at selling Christmas trees.
11	"Choices"	James Whitmore Jr.	Clyde Phillips & Lon Diamond	March 8, 2000	1ADD10
Meghan finds herself drawn to Trent (James Roday), but Trent and Cam don't see eye to eye. Kenny finds marijuana in an old jacket of Mary's.
12	"Absolution"	Jefery Levy	Kevin Murphy	March 15, 2000	1ADD11
Kenny's missing after a spin in his mother's SUV leads to a fender bender. Amy finds out about Clay and Meghan's feelings for each other. Cameron's confession about a junior-high crush causes him major embarrassment. A major development in Mary's pregnancy arises.
13	"Falling from Grace"	James Whitmore Jr.	Tara Butters & Michele Fazekas	March 22, 2000	1ADD12
A prank gone awry at Truman High ends up with a "total Whitewater investigation" underway. Two of the culprits are revealed to be Cameron and Amy, which presents an interesting pair of problems for Meghan. Meghan is also invited to Truman's Winter Ball by Clay while Kenny receives an anonymous invitation by e-mail. Mitch receives a tempting invitation from city engineer Laura.
14	"Tough Love"	Stephen Cragg	Pam Veasey	March 29, 2000	1ADD13
Mitch's ne'er-do-well younger brother (Michael Landes) reappears after a four-year absence. Tension between Mitch and Cameron increases as Cam's expulsion hearing approaches.
15	"Waiting"	Jefery Levy	Clyde Phillips & Lon Diamond	April 5, 2000	1ADD15
Kenny collapses in school and is rushed to the hospital with a temperature of 104.5. He is diagnosed with bacterial meningitis and given an alarming prognosis. Meghan and Clay make a snap decision about their relationship.
16	"Saved"	James Whitmore Jr.	Tom Spezialy	April 12, 2000	1ADD14
Kate (Debi Mazar), a former babysitter for the Green kids who is now a bestselling author, returns to visit the family. Clay receives a track scholarship to attend college in Boston. Cameron begins "continuation school."
17	"The Distance"	Lou Antonio	Alan Cross	April 19, 2000	1ADD16
Mitch and Mary learn that Meghan and Clay are having sex. Kenny's ex-girlfriend Rebecca wants to meet his new girlfriend, Kimberly (Alaina Talbot). Cam has a reinstatement hearing before the school board.
18	"Guilt"	Jefery Levy	Wendy Battles	April 26, 2000	1ADD17
Meghan takes a job with a 22-year-old dot-com entrepreneur (Eric Mabius), whose father (John Michael Higgins), a long-time family friend, is buying Mitch's firehouse. Cam returns to school and discovers Jody (Natalie Ramsey) with her arms around another guy. Kenny is at a loss as to how to celebrate Kimberly's upcoming 16th birthday.
19	"Support System"	Richard Compton	Kevin Murphy	May 3, 2000	1ADD18
Mitch must sell the firehouse, and a potential buyer (Tom Arnold) is an unpaid electrical contractor who also wants his money. Mary's unaware of her husband's straits but Elizabeth isn't. Meanwhile, Mary, who has been volunteering at a women's crisis center since leaving her party-planning business, is given her first counseling assignment. Cam behaves uncharacteristically after Jody stands him up.
20	"History Lessons"	Oz Scott	Tara Butters & Michele Fazekas	May 10, 2000	1ADD19
Clay's track scholarship is jeopardized by his failing calculus grades.
21	"Tested"	Jefery Levy	Tim Schlattmann	May 17, 2000	1ADD20
22	"The Last Weekend"	David Grossman	Clyde Phillips & Lon Diamond	UNAIRED	1ADD21

== Reception ==
Ray Richmond of Variety reviewed the show positively, saying "it manages to feel sassy, hip and provocative" and "[carries]...sophistication, angst and wit while adding a healthy dash of self-aware irony to the stew." Of the pilot, he added, "[Clyde] Phillips and [Scott] Winant dare viewers to dismiss their show as so much hypersensitive blather, using the characters to satirize the show's zeitgeist via the script's liberal pop-culture referencing", and that "what saves the production as a whole, is its giddy irreverence and sharp observations about the ways that family members at different stages of life endure their distinctive brands of hell."

The Star Tribune also gave a positive review, noting "The narration and pop-culture asides are fast, loose, and often very funny, especially when delivered by the sarcastic Jesse Eisenberg, who reacts to bullies and his parents' marital troubles with hilarious nerd-in-the-headlights takes." The Bangor Daily News praised the cast, with critic Dale McGarrigle saying "Somehow, Phillips and a fine cast of actors make 'Get Real' work, despite" its mesh of various genres including "observational comedy, the next relationship melodrama, [and] the next life-or-death suspense."

Kay McFadden of The Seattle Times called Get Real "self-conscious and smirky," saying it "fails to distinguish itself from the herd of like-minded shows this fall." Kinney Littlefield of the Orange County Register criticized the show, calling it a "teen-targeted sketch comedy, stuffed with quick visual schtick, shock-inducing dialogue, and facile, wink-wink, ain't-we-bad digs at other fave teen shows." Hal Boedeker of the Orlando Sentinel wrote the show's style "is comical, smart-aleck, [and] cynical", but its "emotional force is blunted by fantasy scenes, glib dialogue and constant references to other TV series." He also criticized the show's tone as "veering from sophomoric sex comedy to wrenching drama" in a "baffling" fashion.

The series aired in a competitive Wednesday night time slot, going up against the debut of NBC's The West Wing and The WB's teen drama Roswell. It struggled ratings-wise and was eventually cancelled in the spring of 2000, before its final two episodes could be aired.
