= Heaven Help Us (TV series) =

- Title card
- Genre: Comedy drama Fantasy
- Created by: William Blinn
- Starring: John Schneider; Melinda Clarke; Ricardo Montalbán
- Theme music composer: Ken Harrison
- Composer: Gary S. Scott
- Country of origin: United States
- Original language: English
- No. of seasons: 1
- No. of episodes: 13 (list of episodes)

Production
- Executive producers: William Blinn; Aaron Spelling; E. Duke Vincent
- Producers: Mark Masouka; Frank Fischer
- Camera setup: Jerry G. Callaway
- Running time: 60 minutes
- Production companies: Echo Cove Productions; Spelling Television

Original release
- Network: Syndication
- Release: August 25 – December 3, 1994

Heaven Help Us is an American fantasy-comedy-drama television series that aired from August 25 until December 3, 1994. It was part of a syndicated package of shows called the Spelling Premiere Network.

== Premise ==
Newlywed couple Doug and Lexy Monroe (John Schneider and Melinda Clarke) die in a plane crash and appear in a hotel room where an angel, Mr. Shepherd (Ricardo Montalbán), explains that because of a mix-up they have to return to Earth and help people if they wish to earn a place in heaven.

== Cast ==
=== Main ===
- John Schneider as Doug Monroe
- Melinda Clarke as Lexy Monroe
- Ricardo Montalbán as Mr. Shepherd

=== Notable guests ===
- Terence Knox as Police Sgt Jeff Paris
- Marina Sirtis as Carolyn Paris
- Tom Bosley as Albert
- Peter DeLuise as Stumpy
- Nicole Eggert as Natalie
- Soleil Moon Frye as Louisa
- Eric Lutes as Jeff Barnett
- Efrem Zimbalist Jr. as Martin Kitteridge

== Episodes ==
No.	Title	Directed by	Written by	Original release date
1	"A Little Left of Heaven"	Noel Nosseck	William Blinn	August 25, 1994
The first assignment for Doug and Lexy is to keep Lexy's parents from separating.
2	"Upstairs, Upstairs"	Victor Lobl	Larry Brody	September 1, 1994
Doug and Lexy pose as butler and maid in order to help a wealthy family with their communication problems.
3	"Lovers Lullaby"	Noel Nosseck	Unknown	September 8, 1994
The father-in-law of an aspiring singer tries to destroy his dreams.
4	"The Belles Farewell"	Victor Lobl	Lawrence H. Levy	September 15, 1994
Doug and Lexy try to help a college drill team instructor.
5	"Beauty and the Least"	Unknown	Unknown	September 22, 1994
The Monroes try to keep a beautiful aerobics instructor from getting killed when she gets involved with a married couple.
6	"Stepping Out"	Noel Nosseck	Unknown	September 29, 1994
The Monroes help an agoraphobic widow who was a witness to a carjacking.
7	"The Last Great Hope"	Ray Austin	Jodie Lewis	October 6, 1994
The FAA thinks the mechanic who inspected the plane of the newlywed couple, was responsible for the crash. The Monroes help her prove her innocence.
8	"Tara's Fight"	Unknown	Unknown	October 13, 1994
A tennis star has no social life because of a demanding coach.
9	"The Wall"	Anson Williams	Unknown	November 5, 1994
The Monroes help a recruit at a police academy.
10	"A Match Made in Heaven"	Arthur Allan Seidelman	Jodie Lewis	November 12, 1994
A couple's inability to have a child threatens their marriage.
11	"The Temptress"	Unknown	Unknown	November 19, 1994
Doug and Lexy act as marriage counselors in order to help a woman who is being abused by her husband.
12	"The Badge"	Ray Austin	William Blinn	November 26, 1994
Doug and Lexy act as marriage counselors in order to help a woman who is being abused by her husband.
13	"First Comes Love"	Roy Campanella II	Unknown	December 3, 1994
The Monroes try to help a children's author with her new stories.

== See also ==
- List of films about angels
