= Melinda Clarke =

American actress (born 1969)

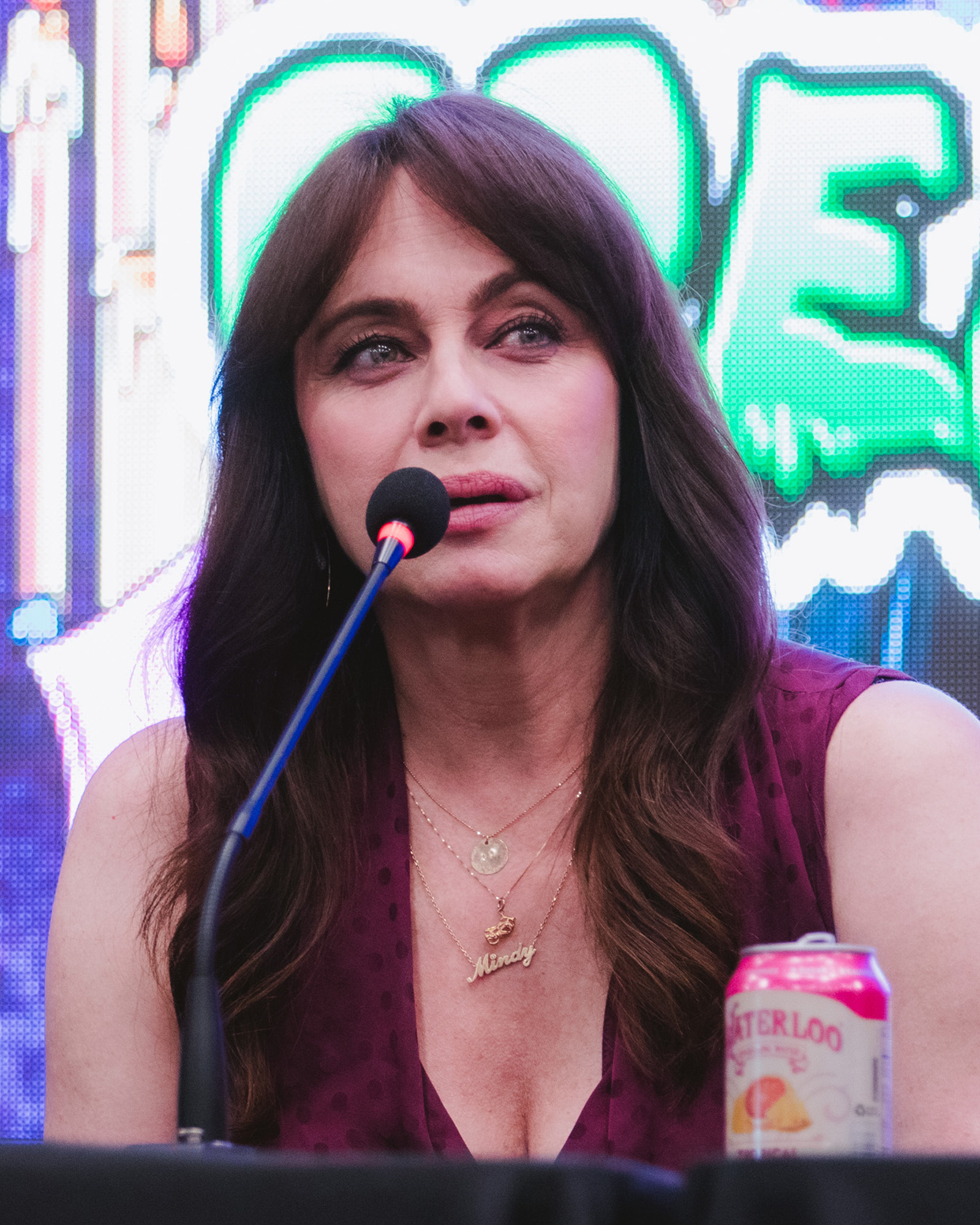
- Clarke in 2025
- Born: Melinda Patrice Clarke; April 24, 1969 (age 57); Dana Point, California, U.S.
- Other name: Mindy Clarke
- Occupation: Actress
- Years active: 1989–present
- Known for: CSI: Crime Scene Investigation; Days of Our Lives; The O.C.; Nikita
- Spouses: Ernie Mirich (m. 1997; div. 2005) Adam Farmer (m. 2015)
- Children: 1
- Father: John Clarke

Melinda Patrice Clarke (born April 24, 1969) is an American actress. She is known for portraying Faith Taylor on the soap opera Days of Our Lives (1989–1990), Julie Cooper on Fox's teen drama series The O.C. (2003–2007), Lady Heather on CBS's crime drama series CSI: Crime Scene Investigation (2001–2015) and Amanda on the action thriller series Nikita (2010–2013).

== Early life ==
Clarke was born and raised in Dana Point, California. She is the daughter of actor John Clarke. Clarke is one of three siblings, and her sister died in 1994 of a malignant heart tumor.

== Career ==
Clarke appeared on the daytime soap opera Days of Our Lives as Faith Taylor (where her father was a senior cast member), and starred in the television series Soldier of Fortune, Inc. (1997–1999). She also guest-starred on Xena: Warrior Princess (1997) as the Amazon chieftain Velasca, Firefly (2003) the brothel madam Nandi, Charmed (2002) as the Siren, and has had six appearances on CSI (2001–2011) where she played dominatrix Lady Heather. She also appeared in the Seinfeld episode "The Muffin Tops", playing Jerry's girlfriend who likes anything hairless. In 1993, she played a lead role in the horror film Return of the Living Dead 3.

She portrayed Julie Cooper in the teen drama series The O.C. that aired on the Fox network from August 5, 2003, to February 22, 2007, running a total of four seasons. Clarke's character Julie Cooper was often characterized as devious and selfish, with USA Today calling her a "shallow vixen". However, she revealed a more vulnerable side of herself a number of times during the series. Clarke was originally billed as a guest star in the first few episodes in which she appeared, but due to fan response was offered a series regular contract; Clarke accepted the role and her character became an integral part of the show's storylines.

In July 2009, Entertainment Weekly placed Clarke's The O.C. character Julie Cooper at No. 3 on their list of "21 Top TV Bitches". In January 2021, Vogue wrote about the fashion choices on The O.C., commenting: "Speaking of the Coopers, I also want to end by saying Julie Cooper (Melinda Clarke), Marissa's mom, is so underrated during this whole series. First of all, she's gorgeous. Secondly, she commands every single room she walks into, whether it's in a pink Juicy Couture tracksuit or a groovy, off-the-shoulder top. Clearly Marissa got all her fashion sense from her."

Clarke has appeared on HBO's comedy-drama series Entourage (2005–2011) as a fictionalized version of herself, married to Malcolm McDowell's character Terrance McQuewick. Clarke portrayed Blithe Meacham in the television film She Drives Me Crazy (2007), which was produced by Kelly Rowan. She had guest roles in several television shows, including Chuck (2007), Reaper (2007) and Ghost Whisperer (2010). In 2010, she appeared on The CW show The Vampire Diaries (2010–2017) as Kelly Donovan, a mother who discovers her daughter has died. Los Angeles Times praised her performance as Kelly by saying: "In a scene without any dialogue, Clarke made Kelly's grief believable and powerful."

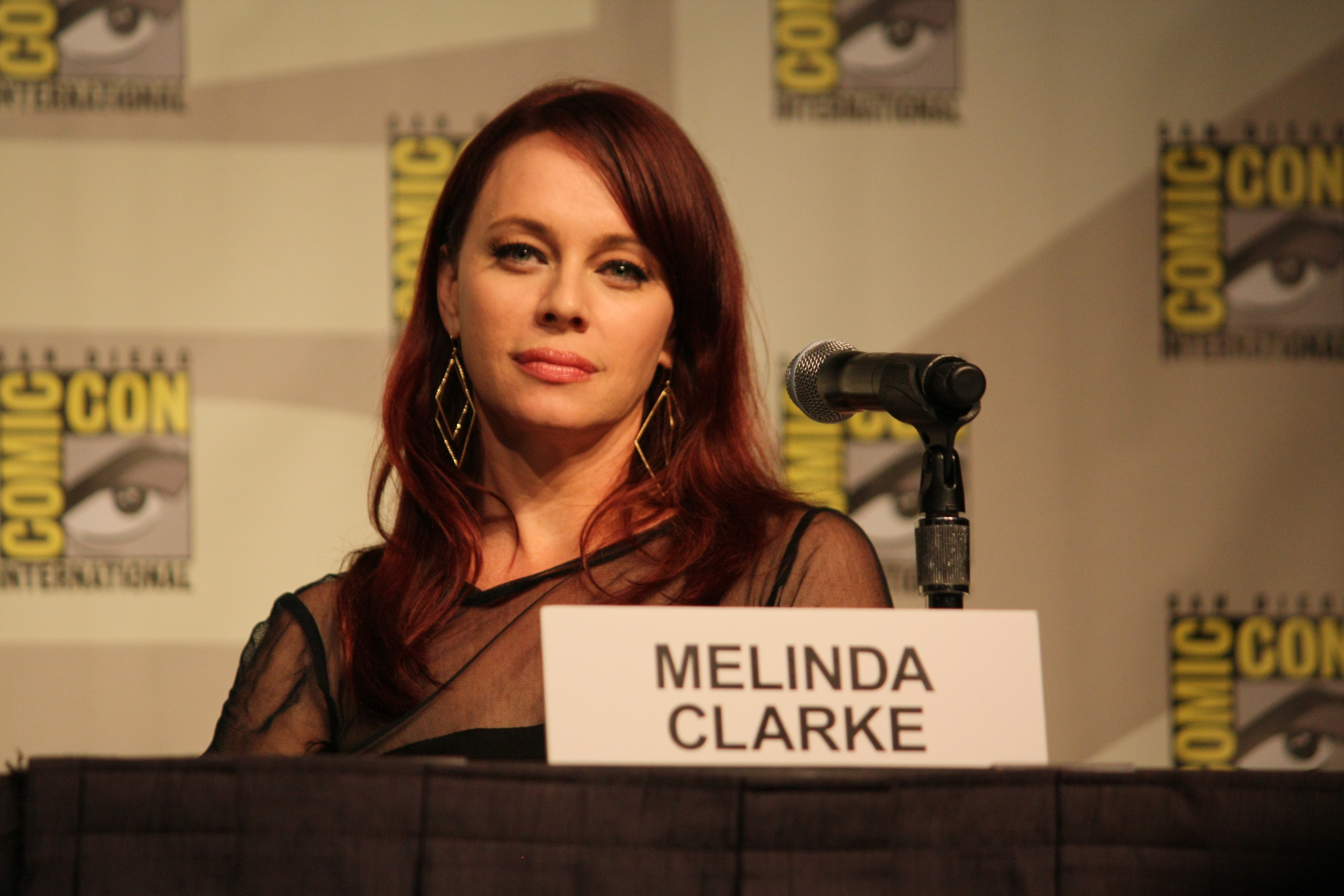
Clarke in 2012

In 2010, she landed one of the main roles in The CW's action drama series Nikita as Helen "Amanda" Collins. Clarke's character was the main antagonist in the show's third and fourth season. The series concluded after four seasons on December 27, 2013. She has lent her voice to several voice acting projects, voicing Alexa in The Animatrix: Matriculated (2003), Sofia Ivanescu in the video game Mission Impossible: Operation Surma (2003), Madame Macmu-Ling in Avatar: The Last Airbender (2006), and Charlene in King of the Hill (2008).

In April 2021, Clarke and her former The O.C. co-star Rachel Bilson launched a weekly podcast titled Welcome to the OC, Bitches! The podcast focuses on the hosts and guests re-watching and discussing episodes of The O.C. In August 2021, the podcast was named one of "7 Top Celebrity Podcasts You Should Subscribe To Right Now" by Bustle. In December 2023, Clarke announced that she is launching a new podcast, Beyond the OC, hosted by Clarke and her daughter. The podcast was launched on April 25, 2024.

== Public image ==
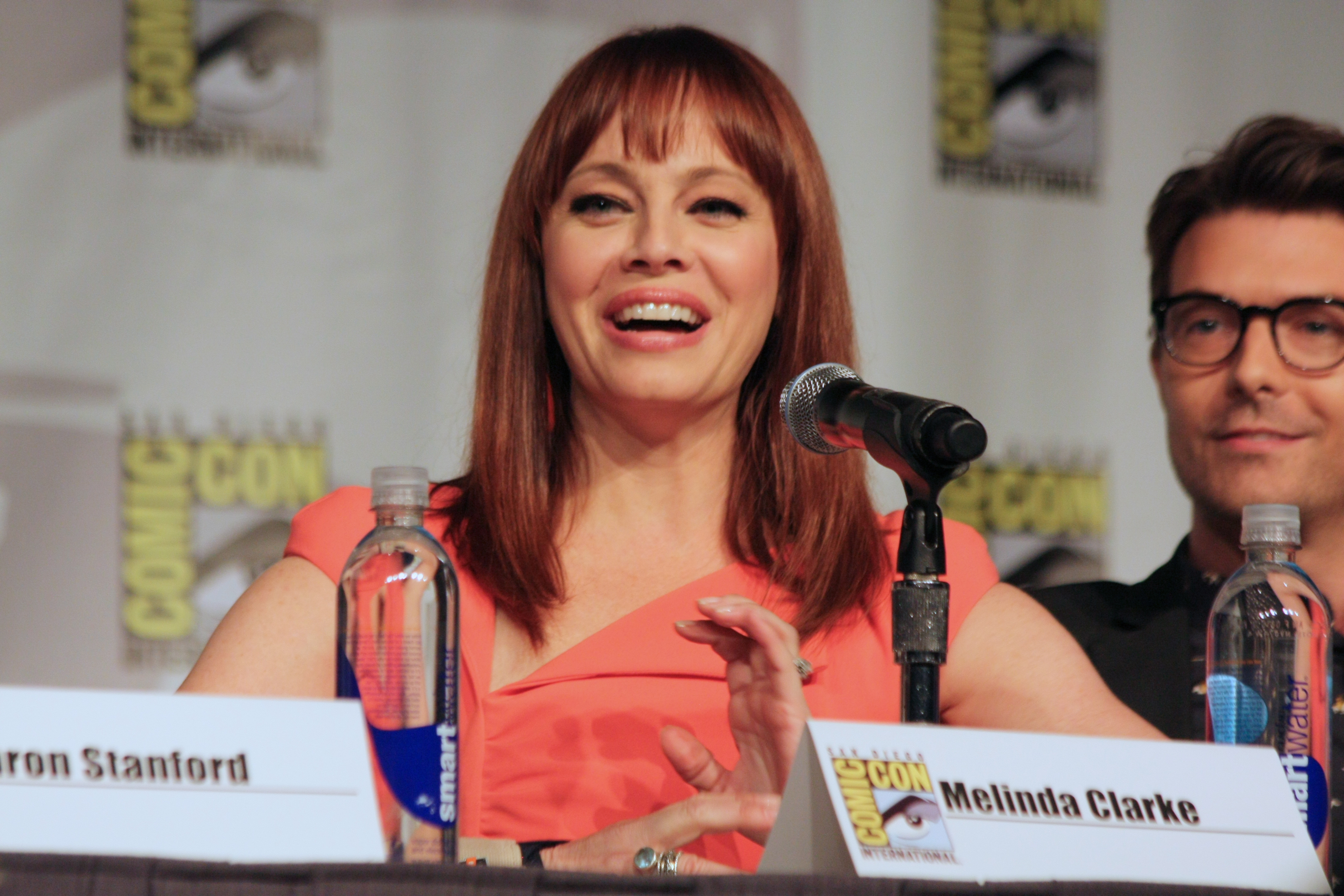
Clarke at San Diego Comic-Con in 2013

Two action figures have been made of Clarke. The first was for her role as Jessica Priest in Spawn (1997) and the second was for her role as Velasca from the television series Xena: Warrior Princess (1997). In August 2005, TV Guide ranked her at No. 5 on their list of "TV's Top Ten Scene Stealers". Clarke has often portrayed characters that are tough, manipulative and villains. In 2011, she said that fans and viewers of Nikita wanted her character Amanda to be "evil" and "as bad as possible". Clarke described her The O.C. character Julie Cooper by saying: "You believe your character's truth—and her truth was maintaining this beautiful façade. Physically and monetarily. But ultimately she is an outsider, and that's what Josh has explained is the biggest theme of this show: everyone is really an outsider. They were one, or they become an outsider, or they feel like an outsider."

During her career, Clarke has appeared in magazine covers and pictorials such as In Touch Weekly, Fangoria, and Regard magazine.

== Personal life ==
Clarke was married to Ernie Mirich from 1997 to 2005, and they have a daughter. In September 2015, Clarke married Adam Farmer in a ceremony held in Dana Point, California.

== Filmography ==
=== Film ===
Year	Title	Role	Notes
1992	Hot Under the Collar	Monica	
1992	Out for Blood	Laura	
1993	Young Goodman Brown	Faith Brown	
1993	Return of the Living Dead 3	Julie Walker	
1995	Return to Two Moon Junction	Savannah DeLongpre	
1996	Mulholland Falls	Cigarette girl	
1996	Killer Tongue	Candy	
1997	Critics and Other Freaks	Mrs. M.	
1997	Soldier of Fortune	Margo Vincent	Television film
1997	Spawn	Jessica Priest	
2002	Cold Sweat	Starring	
2002	.com for Murder	Agent Williams	
2003	The Animatrix	Alexa (voice)	Segment: "Matriculated"
2004	Dynamite	Beta	
2007	She Drives Me Crazy	Blithe Meacham	Television film
2014	How Divine!	Chelsea Kirk	Television film

=== Television ===
Year	Title	Role	Notes
1989–1990	Days of Our Lives	Faith Taylor	130 episodes
1991	Jake and the Fatman	Angel Alexander	Episode: "Every Time We Say Goodbye"
1994	The George Carlin Show	Christy	Episode: "George Helps Sydney"
1994	Heaven Help Us	Lexy Monroe	Main role; 12 episodes
1996	Strange Luck	Lola Vale	Episode: "Lightning Strikes"
1997	Xena: Warrior Princess	Velasca	2 episodes
1997	Nash Bridges	Karen Decker	Episode: "Out of Chicago"
1997	Seinfeld	Alex	Episode: "The Muffin Tops"
1997	Sliders	Allasandra	Episode: "This Slide of Paradise"
1997–1999	Soldier of Fortune, Inc.	Margo Vincent	Main role; 37 episodes
2000	The Pretender	Miss Eve	Episode: "Meltdown"
2000	Nash Bridges	Abby Gordon	Episode: "End Game"
2001	Star Trek: Enterprise	Sarin	Episode: "Broken Bow: Part 2"
2001–2015	CSI: Crime Scene Investigation	Lady Heather / Dr. Kessler	Recurring role
2002	First Monday	Unknown	Episode: "Pilot"
2002–2003	The District	Detective Olivia Cahill	Recurring role (seasons 2–3); 5 episodes
2002	Charmed	Siren	Episode: "Siren's Song"
2002	Everwood	Sally Keyes	Episode: "Till Death Do Us Part"
2003	Tremors	Megan Flint	Episode: "Night of the Shriekers"
2003	Firefly	Nandi	Episode: "Heart of Gold"
2003–2007	The O.C.	Julie Cooper	Main role; 90 episodes
2004	50 Most Wicked Women of Primetime	Herself / Co-host / Julie Cooper	E! television special
2005–2011	Entourage	Herself	6 episodes
2006	Avatar: The Last Airbender	Madame Macmu-Ling	Voice; Episode: "The Tales of Ba Sing Se"
2007	Reaper	Mimi	Episode: "Ashes to Ashes"
2008	King of the Hill	Charlene (voice)	Episode: "Untitled Blake McCormick Project"
2008	Chuck	Sasha Banacheck	Episode: "Chuck Versus the Seduction"
2008–2009	Eli Stone	Dr. Lee	3 episodes
2009	Hell's Kitchen	Herself	Episode: "13 Chefs Compete"
2010	Ghost Whisperer	Donna	Episode: "Old Sins Cast Long Shadows"
2010–2013	Nikita	Helen "Amanda" Collins	Main role; 70 episodes
2010, 2017	The Vampire Diaries	Kelly Donovan	Recurring role (season 1); guest role (season 8)
2013	Vegas	Lena Cavallo	Recurring role
2014	Dallas	Tracey McKay	2 episodes
2016	Gotham	Grace Van Dahl	3 episodes
2018	Swedish Dicks	Rebecca Glos	Episode: "It Had to Be Lou"
2023	Fantasy Island	Amber Graham	Episode: "#Happy"
2025	S.W.A.T.	Marie Alfaro	Episode: "Exploited"

=== Video games ===
Year	Title	Role	Notes
2003	Mission: Impossible – Operation Surma	Sofia Ivanescu	Voice
2012	Nikita: Codebreaker	Amanda	

=== Podcast series ===
Year	Title	Role	Notes
2021	Movies That Changed My Life	Guest	Episode: "Rachel Bilson and Melinda Clarke: All That Jazz and Dirty Dancing"
2021–2023	Welcome to the OC, Bitches!	Co–host	46 episodes
2024–present	Beyond the OC	Co–host	11 episodes as of July 11, 2024

=== Music videos ===
Year	Title	Artist	Notes
1995	"Have You Ever Really Loved a Woman?"	Bryan Adams	

== Awards and nominations ==
Year	Award/Festival	Category	Nominated work	Result
1990	Young Artist Awards	Best Young Actress in a Daytime Drama	Days of Our Lives	Nominated
1994	Fangoria Chainsaw Awards	Best Actress	Return of the Living Dead 3	Won
1996	Sitges Film Festival	Best Actress	Killer Tongue	Won
