= Nikita (TV series) =

2010 American action thriller drama television series

- Genre: Drama; Thriller; Action; Spy fiction; Psychological thriller
- Created by: Characters: Joel Surnow; (original series)
- Based on: La Femme Nikita by Luc Besson
- Developed by: Craig Silverstein
- Starring: Maggie Q; Shane West; Lyndsy Fonseca; Aaron Stanford; Ashton Holmes; Tiffany Hines; Melinda Clarke; Xander Berkeley; Dillon Casey; Noah Bean; Devon Sawa
- Theme music composer: David E. Russo
- Country of origin: United States
- Original language: English
- No. of seasons: 4
- No. of episodes: 73 (list of episodes)

Production
- Executive producers: Craig Silverstein; Danny Cannon; McG; Peter Johnson; David Levinson
- Producers: Marc David Alper; Albert Kim
- Production locations: Pinewood Toronto Studios, Cambridge, Ontario; Toronto, Ontario, Canada
- Cinematography: David Stockton; Glen Keenan; Rene Ohashi
- Editors: Mark C. Baldwin; Chris Peppe; David Lebowitz; Scott Boyd; John Peter Bernardo
- Camera setup: Single-camera
- Running time: 42 minutes
- Production companies: Wonderland Sound and Vision; Sesfonstein Productions; Warner Bros. Television; Nikita Films

Original release
- Network: The CW
- Release: September 9, 2010 – December 27, 2013

Related
- La Femme Nikita (1997–2001)

Nikita is an American action thriller drama television series that aired on the CW from September 9, 2010, to December 27, 2013, in the United States. The series is an adaptation of Luc Besson's French film La Femme Nikita, the second such adaptation after the 1997 Canadian TV series La Femme Nikita.

The series focuses on Nikita (Maggie Q), a woman who escaped from a secret government-funded organization known as "Division" and, after a three-year hiding period, is back to bring down the organization. The main cast in various seasons features Q, Lyndsy Fonseca, Shane West, Aaron Stanford, Melinda Clarke, Xander Berkeley, Noah Bean, Tiffany Hines, Ashton Holmes, Dillon Casey, and Devon Sawa.

== Plot ==
The series focuses on Nikita Mears, a woman who escaped from a secret U.S. government-funded organization known as Division, and after spending three years in hiding, is back to bring Division down. Division, created and supervised by an organization called Oversight, is responsible for black operations including espionage, sabotage, and assassination. Under the leadership of its first director and founding member, Percival "Percy" Rose, Division has gone rogue and performs under-the-table murder-for-hire. To protect himself, Percy has created a series of 'black boxes', hard drives containing every job Division has ever done, as leverage to prevent Oversight from removing him or ending Division. Percy's black boxes are hidden in secret locations around the world, under the protection of Guardians, high-ranking Division agents.

Division fills its ranks primarily by recruiting young people with troubled backgrounds, often directly from prison. Division fakes the recruits' deaths, erases all evidence of their past lives, and molds them into efficient spies and assassins. The recruits generally do not have the freedom to leave the agency. Recruits may be "cancelled" (killed) if their progress is deemed unsatisfactory, and to this end, Division implants the recruits with tracking devices and kill chips.

Nikita was recruited by Division when she was a deeply troubled teenager, on death row. Division rescued her, faked her death, and told her she was getting a second chance to start a new life and serve her country. Throughout her grueling training, Nikita never lost her humanity. Once she graduated from recruit to field agent, she broke Division rules by falling in love with a civilian, to whom she became engaged and planned to run away. When Division found out and assassinated Nikita's fiancé, Nikita went rogue. She makes it her mission to bring down Division, as a way to avenge her fiancé and atone for the sins she committed as a Division agent. Percy orders Michael, the Division operative who trained Nikita, to deal with her.

On the outside, Nikita trains a young woman named Alex, who as a child was saved by Nikita during a mission that killed Alex's father years ago. Nikita has Alex become a recruit inside Division, working as a mole to gain intelligence. Throughout season one, Nikita works to disrupt Division's operations, with the support of Alex's intelligence from the inside. Nikita also encounters Gogol, a Russian security department operative and established enemy of Division. Nikita slowly brings other allies to her side, including Michael when he realizes the true extent of Percy's corruption as well as his own feelings for Nikita. At the end of the season, Nikita manages to foil Percy's plan to take over the CIA and gain its top-secret funding. However, she is forced to go on the run with Michael. At the same time, Nikita loses Alex when Alex discovers that Nikita killed her father on the Division mission years ago. When Alex is exposed as Nikita's mole and finds herself at the mercy of Division and Oversight, Amanda offers Alex a deal: help Division stop Nikita, and Division will help Alex bring down the man who ordered the hit on her father.

In season two, Nikita and Michael focus and press their efforts against Oversight, seeking to destroy the group, which will also cripple Division at the same time. Division has changed, with Percy being locked up for his actions in season one, and Amanda taking control of the organization, with Oversight supervising her. Alex has set her sights on Sergei Semak, her father's right-hand man and also the one responsible for ordering his death, who has taken over Zetrov, her father's company and controller of Gogol. Nikita and Michael manage to expose or kill most of Oversight, with the help of Seymour Birkhoff, a former Division head technician, who left the organization after Percy was imprisoned. While trying to bring down Oversight, Nikita and Michael hunt down the remaining black boxes, finally destroying all but one. The final black box has fallen into the hands of Gogol's leader, Ari Tasarov, who is later revealed to be Amanda's lover and exposes her as a traitor. With the help of the last of the Guardians, Percy escapes his prison and manages to overthrow Amanda's control of Division, sending Ari and her into hiding, along with the last black box. Percy also manages to kill all members of Oversight and puts a plan into place to use plutonium to gain membership of an unknown group of powerful people. Having no other choice, Nikita and Michael decide to take the situation to the president, with the help of Ryan, who has been helping Nikita on her mission since season one. Alex reconciles with Nikita, after having finally brought down Semak and restored her father's company. While her allies attempt to stop Percy's most trusted man, Roan, from using the plutonium to blow up Washington, DC, Nikita and Michael infiltrate Division, managing to expose Percy's corruption and evil deeds, ending his leadership over the organization. Percy is killed by Nikita after trying to escape, and Roan is killed by Alex before he could set off the plutonium. The vice president assigns Ryan as the new director of Division and gives Nikita the task of hunting down Amanda and the last of Division's agents who have gone rogue.

== Cast and characters ==
Characters are listed in order of title credit and by appearance on the show.

Actor	Character	Seasons			
Actor	Character	1	2	3	4
Maggie Q	Nikita Mears	Main	Main	Main	Main
Shane West	Michael Bishop	Main	Main	Main	Main
Lyndsy Fonseca	Alex Udinov	Main	Main	Main	Main
Aaron Stanford	Seymour Birkhoff / Lionel Peller	Main	Main	Main	Main
Ashton Holmes	Thom	Main			
Tiffany Hines	Jaden	Main			
Melinda Clarke	Helen "Amanda" Collins	Main	Main	Main	Main
Xander Berkeley	Percival "Percy" Rose	Main	Main		
Dillon Casey	Sean Pierce		Main	Main	
Noah Bean	Ryan Fletcher	Recurring	Recurring	Main	Main
Devon Sawa	Owen Elliot / Sam Matthews	Recurring	Recurring	Main	Main

The cast of the final season of Nikita; from left to right: Noah Bean, Lyndsy Fonseca, Aaron Stanford, Maggie Q, Melinda Clarke, and Shane West.

The series borrows many characters, or at least their names, from the 1997 television series La Femme Nikita, which was also based on the French film La Femme Nikita. Maggie Q portrays Nikita, the protagonist and a former spy and assassin who has gone rogue and now plans to bring down Division. Q also performs her own stunts. Shane West plays Michael, a Division operative who trained Nikita. He sees Division and its recruits as a kind of family to him, the complete opposite of Amanda, portrayed by Melinda Clarke, Division's psychologist, interrogator, and a master manipulator. Seymour Birkhoff, Division's computer genius and head technician, is portrayed by Aaron Stanford. The head of Division is Percy, played by Xander Berkeley.

In the season one finale, the audience is introduced to a Senator Madeline Pierce, played by Alberta Watson, who also played the part of Madeline in the former La Femme Nikita television series (Madeline was that series' counterpart to Amanda). Lyndsy Fonseca portrays Alexandra "Alex" Udinov, a former sex slave and drug addict who was arrested after a robbery and later became Division's newest recruit. She is also a mole whom Nikita is using to destroy Division from the inside. Other recruits include Jaden (Tiffany Hines) and Thom (Ashton Holmes) but their characters are later killed off by Nathan (Thad Luckinbill) and Alex respectively. Dillon Casey portrays the role of Sean Pierce, a former Navy SEAL sent to Division directly from Oversight. Noah Bean portrays Ryan Fletcher, an agent in the CIA, but later takes over Division. Some other notable recurring characters include Ari Tasarov (Peter Outerbridge), Sergei Semak (Peter J. Lucas), Roan (Rob Stewart), and Nathan Colville (Thad Luckinbill).

=== Main ===
- Maggie Q as Nikita Mears: The show's central protagonist and titular character, Nikita is a spy and assassin who has vowed to destroy the secret agency that trained her: Division. She is the mentor and close confidant of Alex, and she is a former protege of Amanda. She gains close ties with majority of the people she works with, such as Michael - who eventually becomes her love interest - Seymour Birkhoff, Owen Elliot and Ryan Fletcher.
- Shane West as Michael Bishop: An ex-Division agent who fell in love with Nikita and joined forces with her to destroy his former employers.
- Lyndsy Fonseca as Alexandra "Alex" Udinov: The young woman Nikita rescued the night Division killed her family. She trained to destroy Division, and she also seeks revenge against Division for the massacre of her family. She is Amanda's former protege and Nikita's very close friend.
- Aaron Stanford as Seymour Birkhoff/Lionel Peller: A computer genius, hacker, and nonconformist. Former employee of Division until he sided with Nikita in order to bring order to the underworld of black ops and corrupted crimes.
- Ashton Holmes as Thom: A Division assassin who was recruited before Alex.
- Tiffany Hines as Jaden: A Division assassin who was recruited before Alex.
- Melinda Clarke as Helen "Amanda" Collins: The show's main antagonist in the third and fourth season, Amanda is a master manipulator, interrogator, and psychologist. She is also a former head of Division as well as an enemy and former mentor of Nikita and Alex.
- Xander Berkeley as Percival "Percy" Rose: The show's main antagonist in the first and second season, Percy is the former head of Division who involves his government access with black market crimes and assassination of powerful people around the world.
- Dillon Casey as Sean Pierce: A former Navy SEAL hired to keep an eye on Division and the activities that take place.
- Devon Sawa as Owen Elliot/Sam Matthews: A former Division cleaner and Guardian who turns against the company.
- Noah Bean as Ryan Fletcher: A former CIA agent and analyst who is a close ally of Nikita. He was appointed the new head of Division in season three to clean up the company's history.

=== Recurring ===
- Rob Stewart as Roan (seasons 1–2): Cleaner of Division and Percy's right-hand man.
- Peter Outerbridge as Ari Tasarov (seasons 1–3): Former head of GOGOL, a Russian Division counterpart, and Amanda's former love interest.
- Thad Luckinbill as Nathan Colville (season 1): Alex's neighbor and love interest following her graduation from Division.
- Alberta Watson as Madeline Pierce (guest star season 1; recurring season 2): A U.S. Senator, former member of Oversight and mother of Sean Pierce. Watson had previously played a similar character, also named Madeline, in the 1997 TV series.
- Lyndie Greenwood as Sonya (seasons 2–4): The head technician of Division since Birkhoff's leave and former subordinate of Amanda.
- Helena Mattsson as Cassandra Ovechkin (season 2): Former GOGOL agent and mother of Michael's son, Max.
- Peter J. Lucas as Sergei Semak (season 2): The CEO of Zetrov and head of GOGOL.
- Cameron Daddo as Charles Grayson (season 2): The former president of the United States.
- Michelle Nolden as Kathleen Spencer (seasons 2–4): The vice president of the United States, later succeeded Charles Grayson as president.
- David S. Lee as Phillip Jones (season 2 & 4; guest season 3): Former CFO of MDK Industries and a high-ranked member of the Invisible Hand.
- Sarah Allen as Anne (season 3): Former Division agent and Amanda's subordinate.
- Richard T. Jones as Evan Danforth (season 3): Former commander in the U.S. Navy and Special Advisor to President Kathleen Spencer.

== Series overview ==
Season	Episodes	Originally released	
Season	Episodes	First released	Last released
1	22	September 9, 2010	May 12, 2011
2	23	September 23, 2011	May 18, 2012
3	22	October 19, 2012	May 17, 2013
4	6	November 22, 2013	December 27, 2013

== Production ==
=== Conception ===
"It's a dark fairytale. This girl [Nikita] is taken from one life, her identity is erased, she's put in another life and she's transformed. It's like Alice in Wonderland. She's told, 'Eat this, drink that, steal this, kill that,' and she's not told why. And, she begins to find her own identity through that. It's just a great story."

— Craig Silverstein, executive producer

The CW had long been interested in an action-adventure series centered on a strong female character. On January 27, 2010, the CW ordered a pilot episode of Nikita. The 2010 television series is more closely tied to Luc Besson's 1990 French film Nikita than the 1997 television series, La Femme Nikita. However, the series does borrow many characters, or at least character names, from the previous television series.

=== Development ===
During the 2010 Television Critics Association press tour in Los Angeles on July 29, 2010, executive producer Craig Silverstein said he was approached by Warner Bros. who owned the rights. Silverstein said, "My first thought was I love Nikita. My second thought was, 'it's been done.' Could it be done fresh? Could we have a take where you didn't know where this story would end?" As a result, two major changes were made, one of which was the decision to have the story take place after Nikita has escaped. Maggie Q stated, "No one's told her story after the fact. No one knows where she is going." In addition, a new character, Alex, is introduced who has an unexpected backstory. The series is a mix of a weekly missions and counter-missions, along with a story arc running through the first season that explores Nikita's relationships with Alex and Michael.

While presenting its 2010–11 season schedule on May 21, 2010, the CW officially confirmed the pick-up of the series and announced its intention to air Nikita after The Vampire Diaries on Thursday nights. In October 2010, Entertainment Weekly announced that the series would receive some tweaking to attract more of a female audience, including a new character and potential love interest for Nikita. However, the network promised the core of the show would remain the same. Later that month, the show was picked up for a full season, which would total 22 episodes. The CW admitted it took gambles this year but said they were "thrilled that [it] paid off for us".

On May 17, 2011 Nikita was renewed for a second season by the CW in the 2011–12 fall season. It was later announced that they would move the show to Friday nights at 8:00 p.m., pairing it with Supernatural, beginning Fall 2011. The second season premiered on Friday, September 23, 2011.

On May 11, 2012, the CW renewed the series for a full third season.

On May 9, 2013, the CW renewed the series for a shortened fourth and final season. The final season consisted of just six episodes and was produced to complete the storyline and make it more desirable for a Netflix audience.

=== Casting ===
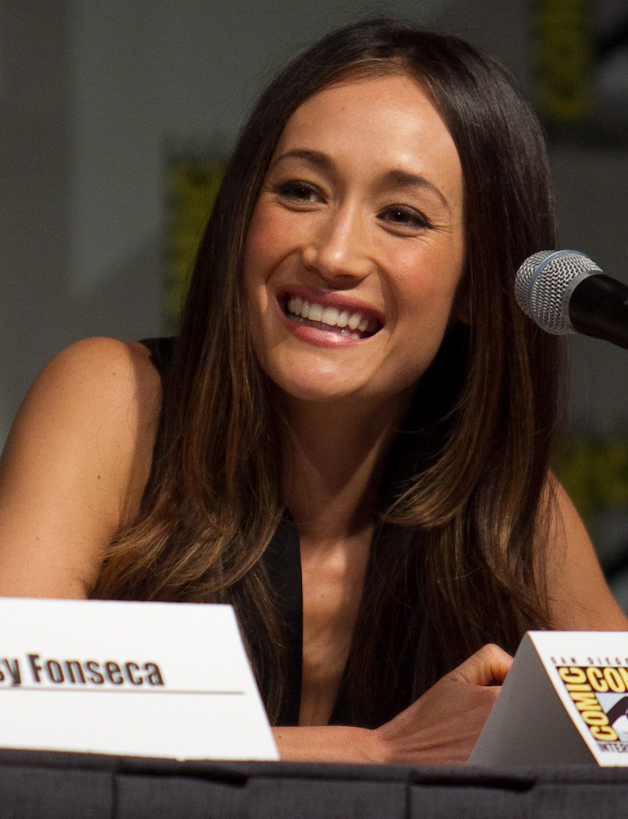
On why he cast Q, Silverstein said "it had to be someone who was beautiful, who could fight, who you could believe holding a gun and who you believed was smart".

In February 2010, Maggie Q was cast as Nikita. Executive producer Silverstein said casting Q was a simple and quick process, because they wanted someone who was beautiful, and could fight, and who you could believe holding a gun at the same time, and she was perfect. Later that month, Shane West was cast as Michael. In March, Lyndsy Fonseca was given the role of Alex. Silverstein commented the casting of Fonseca, saying she came in at the last moment but was cast because they liked her intensity. Later that month, Tiffany Hines was cast as Jaden and Xander Berkeley was added to the cast as Percy. In October 2010, Noah Bean gained a recurring role as Ryan Fletcher, a CIA case officer and analyst.

Casting for the second season started in July 2011 when Dillon Casey was cast as Sean Pierce, a former U.S. Navy Special Warfare Development Group (DEVGRU, formerly Seal Team Six) officer contracted to monitor Amanda's work at Division and recover the stolen black boxes. Casey was later promoted as a series regular.

After being recurring cast members for two seasons, Noah Bean and Devon Sawa were made series regulars for the third season.

=== Crew ===
Writers	Directors
Craig Silverstein, Juan Carlos Coto, Albert Kim, Kristen Reidel, Kalinda Vazquez, Andrew Colville, Brandon Guercio, Travis Fickett, Terry Matalas, Jim Barnes, Amanda Segel, Mary Trahan	Eagle Egilsson, Nick Copus, Danny Cannon, Kenneth Fink, Dwight H. Little, David Solomon, Jeffrey G. Hunt, Brad Turner, Marc David Alpert, John Badham, Chris Peppe, Michael Robinson

=== Filming locations ===
Although the show is set in and around New Jersey, Nikita is primarily filmed in Canada—specifically, in Toronto and elsewhere in Ontario. Much of the show is filmed on location, but studio shooting is also used for sets such as 'Division' and the penthouse. Many landmark locations used on the show, such as the White House, are actually doubles meant to represent various places in North America. The series officially wrapped production on October 1, 2013.

== Reception ==
=== Critical response ===
On the review aggregation website Rotten Tomatoes, the series holds an approval rating of 85% over the series four seasons. The first seasons critics' consensus reads: "Building on Maggie Q's strong central performance, Nikita is a strong spy thriller that's sleek and action-packed (if a little heavy with backstory)." Metacritic gave it a score of 69/100 based on 30 critics reviews, indicating "generally favorable reviews". Comparisons were made to Joss Whedon's Dollhouse and the ABC spy drama Alias. Critics had praise for Maggie Q in the lead role, the look of the show, solid action sequences, the chemistry between the cast especially between the two leads Q and West, and an intriguing twist at the end, but noted that the dialogue needed some humor.

=== Ratings ===
==== U.S. Nielsen ratings ====
The pilot episode drew 3.57 million viewers on its initial broadcast. The CW broadcast an encore of the pilot the following day, which drew approximately 2.6 million viewers. The finale was seen by 1.94 million viewers. The first season averaged 2.40 million viewers and a 0.9 18–49 rating in live + same day DVR viewing per episode. Season 2 averaged a 0.5 18-49 rating using Nielsen Live + Same Day DVR data.

The following is a table for the seasonal rankings, based on average total estimated viewers per episode, of Nikita on the CW. "Rank" refers to how Nikita rated compared to the other television series that aired during prime time hours.

Season	Time slot (ET)	No. of episodes	Premiere		Finale		TV season	Rank	Viewers (in millions)
Season	Time slot (ET)	No. of episodes	Date	Premiere viewers (in millions)	Date	Finale viewers (in millions)	TV season	Rank	Viewers (in millions)
1	Thursday 9:00 pm	22	September 9, 2010	3.57	May 12, 2011	1.94	2010–2011	135	2.32
2	Friday 8:00 pm	23	September 23, 2011	1.85	May 18, 2012	1.42	2011–2012	182	1.77
3	Friday 9:00 pm Friday 8:00 pm	22	October 19, 2012	0.95	May 17, 2013	1.00	2012–2013	145	1.38
4	Friday 9:00 pm	6	November 22, 2013	0.74	December 27, 2013	0.82	2013	TBA	0.76

==== International ratings ====
In the UK, the show was the most watched show for Sky Living every week that its autumn episodes aired. When it returned from hiatus in the summer in a new Wednesday 9:00 PM slot, it finished fourth in the week. However, it was able to increase again in the following weeks.

In the Netherlands the series premiered with solid ratings, the first episode drew an audience of 640,000 viewers. The second episode was broadcast right after the first episode and drew 757,000 viewers, it had a market share of 10.3%. With these numbers Nikita was the 4th most watched channel of the evening.

In France the series premiered with high ratings in its 11:20 p.m. timeslot, the first episode drew an audience of 2.4 million viewers. The show obtained an audience share of 22.6% of France's population which is an extremely high rating despite its timeslot.

In Bulgaria the series averaged 663,000 viewers and was placed at number 12 in the ratings for July.

=== Awards and accolades ===
The series earned numerous award nominations from awards shows and entertainment organizations such as the American Society of Cinematographers, the People's Choice Awards, the Teen Choice Awards and the 63rd Primetime Emmy Awards.

Year	Award	Category	Nominee(s)	Result	Ref.
2010	American Society of Cinematographers	Outstanding Cinematography in Episodic TV Series	David Stockton ("Pilot")	Nominated	
2010	IGN Summer Movie Awards	Best New TV Series	Nikita	Nominated	
2010	IGN Summer Movie Awards	Best TV Hero	Maggie Q	Nominated	
2011	IGN Summer Movie Awards	Best TV Hero	Maggie Q	Nominated	
2011	IGN Summer Movie Awards	Best TV Villain	Xander Berkeley	Nominated	
2011	People's Choice Awards	Favorite New TV Drama	Nikita	Nominated	
2011	Primetime Emmy Awards	Outstanding Sound Editing for a Series	George Haddad ("Pandora")	Nominated	
2011	Teen Choice Awards	Choice TV Actor: Action	Shane West	Won	
2011	Teen Choice Awards	Choice TV Actress: Action	Lyndsy Fonseca	Nominated	
2011	Teen Choice Awards	Choice TV Actress: Action	Maggie Q	Nominated	
2011	Teen Choice Awards	Choice TV Show: Action	Nikita	Nominated	
2012	IGN Summer Movie Awards	Best TV Action Series	Nikita	Won	
2012	IGN Summer Movie Awards	Best TV Hero	Maggie Q	Nominated	
2012	IGN Summer Movie Awards	Best TV Villain	Xander Berkeley	Nominated	
2012	Teen Choice Awards	Choice TV Actor: Action	Shane West	Nominated	
2012	Teen Choice Awards	Choice TV Actress: Action	Lyndsy Fonseca	Nominated	
2012	Teen Choice Awards	Choice TV Actress: Action	Maggie Q	Nominated	
2012	Teen Choice Awards	Choice TV Show: Action	Nikita	Nominated	
2013	IGN Summer Movie Awards	Best TV Action Series	Nikita	Nominated	
2013	Leo Awards	Best Direction in a Dramatic Series	Steven A. Adelson	Nominated	
2013	Primetime Emmy Awards	Outstanding Sound Editing for a Series	George Haddad ("Aftermath")	Nominated	
2013	Teen Choice Awards	Choice TV Actor: Action	Shane West	Nominated	
2013	Teen Choice Awards	Choice TV Actress: Action	Lyndsy Fonseca	Nominated	
2013	Teen Choice Awards	Choice TV Actress: Action	Maggie Q	Nominated	
2013	Teen Choice Awards	Choice TV Show: Action	Nikita	Nominated	
2013	TV Guide Awards	Favorite Ensemble	Nikita	Nominated	

== Promotion ==
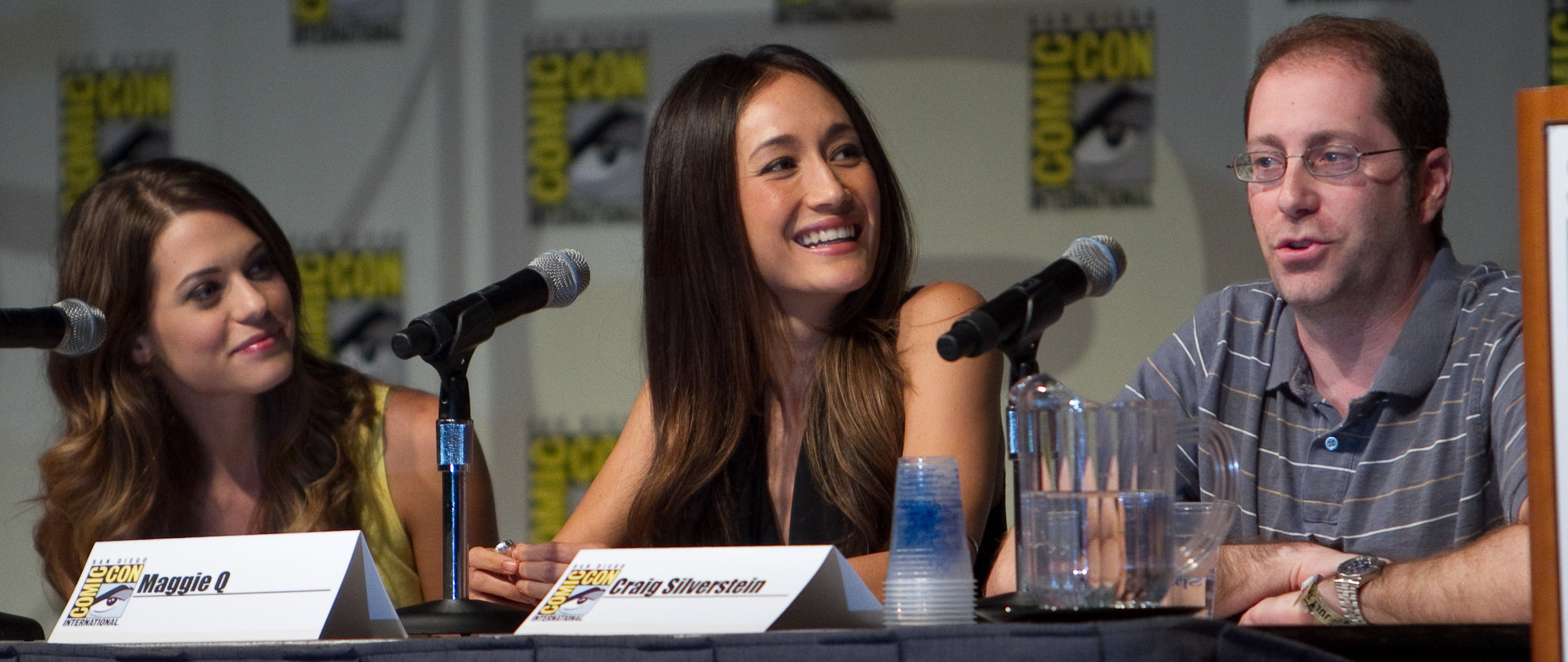
Lyndsy Fonseca, Maggie Q, and Craig Silverstein at San Diego Comic-Con, July 2010

The show was promoted through pop-culture conventions such as San Diego Comic-Con from 2010 to 2013.

== Release ==
=== Broadcast ===
In the United States, the show aired on the CW. In December 2020, it was also released to the network's streaming platform, CW Seed, accessible to U.S. audiences.

Sky Living secured the rights to air Nikita in the United Kingdom as the centerpiece of the channel's autumn schedule. Living's head of acquisitions Amy Barham said "Nikita is the hottest, most action-packed drama of the season with an amazingly strong female lead that we know will excite and engage Living's audiences this autumn. We're thrilled to be able to bring it exclusively to the channel. Chase will follow in 2011, providing a new favorite show for all of our procedural fans."

In Australia, the show aired on Fox8. In New Zealand, Nikita was shown on TV2 at 10:30 pm on Thursdays. In Canada, it aired on CTV Two and started airing the same day as in the U.S.

In Greece and Cyprus, Nikita aired on Star and ANT1, respectively.

=== Home media ===
Home releases of the series are distributed through Warner Bros. Home Video.

DVD
Season	Release dates				Extras	# of discs
Season	Region 1	Region 2	Region 3	Region 4	Extras	# of discs
1	August 30, 2011	September 19, 2011	December 8, 2011	November 2, 2011	Audio commentary; deleted scenes; gag reel; "Inside Division, Part 1: The New Nikita"; "Inside Division, Part 2: Executing an Episode"; "Profiling Nikita, Alex, Percy & Michael"; Division tracker (Blu-ray exclusive)	5
2	October 2, 2012	October 1, 2012	TBA	February 13, 2013	Gag reel; deleted scenes; audio commentary (featuring Craig Silverstein and Carlos Coto); and two featurettes: "What if? Writing the Fate of Division" and "Living the Life: Maggie Q."	5
3	October 22, 2013	February 10, 2014	TBA	November 13, 2013	Deleted scenes; gag reel	5
4	May 20, 2014	October 6, 2014	TBA	TBA	None	2

Blu-ray
Season	Episodes	Discs	Region A		Region B	
Season	Episodes	Discs	United States	Canada	United Kingdom	Australia
1	22	4	August 30, 2011	September 19, 2011	December 8, 2011	October 26, 2011
2	23	4	October 2, 2012	October 2, 2012	October 1, 2012	February 13, 2013
3	22	4	October 22, 2013	November 23, 2013	December 22, 2013	November 13, 2013
4	6	1	May 20, 2014	June 4, 2014	October 6, 2014	June 25, 2014

== Other media ==
A 3D action game based on the TV series titled Nikita Spy Training was released on iOS and Android. It featured sneaking, shooting, and getting in and out of drivable vehicles in the style of open world top-down open world games. The game has since been removed from both marketplaces.

== See also ==
- Point of No Return (film)
