= Nick Copus =

British cinematographer, director, producer and writer

- Born: Nicholas Copus; 4 September 1966 (age 60); Hendon, London, England
- Occupations: Cinematographer, Director, Producer, Writer
- Years active: 1997–present

Nicholas Copus (born 4 September 1966 in Hendon, London, England) is a British cinematographer, director, producer, and writer of film and television. As a director his credits include Bel-Air (TV series), The Curse of Buckout Road, Cruel Intentions (TV series), Titans (2018 TV series), Animal Kingdom (TV series), American Gods (TV series), The Right Stuff (TV series), Lethal Weapon (TV series), Queen Of The South (TV series), Gotham (TV series), Turn: Washington's Spies, Salem (TV series), Arrow (TV series), Nikita (TV series), Alphas, The Day of the Triffids (2009 TV series), The Summit (TV series), The 4400, The Dresden Files (TV series), Painkiller Jane (TV series), Holby City, and EastEnders. In 2025, Copus is filming Percy Jackson and is slated to be the director for Quebec Biker War, a TV series about the outlaw biker gang war in Montreal between the Hells Angels and the Rock Machine Motorcycle Club. The series is based on former outlaw biker Edward Winterhalder's autobiography Searching For My Identity.
