= Kelly Greyson =

American actress

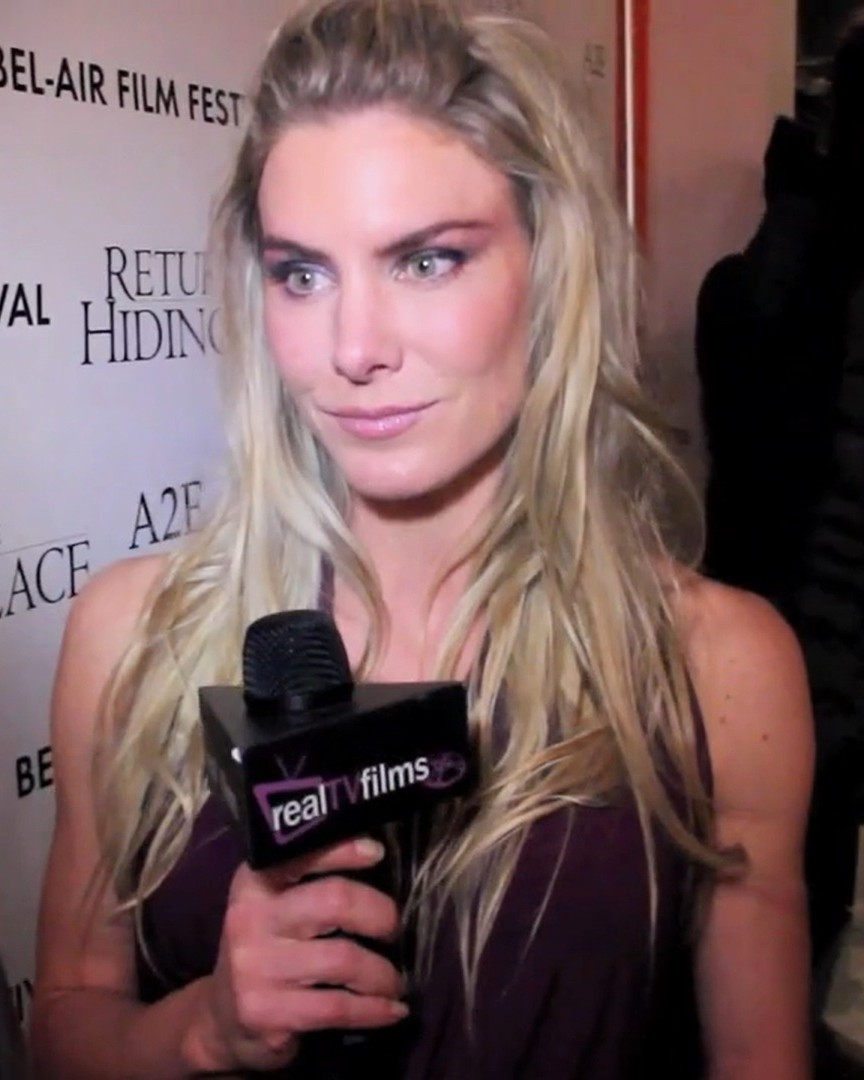
- Greyson in 2014
- Born: Texas, United States
- Occupation: Actress
- Years active: 2011–present
- Website: www.kellygreyson.com

Kelly Greyson is an American actress. Her acting roles include Lana in Return to the Hiding Place, Tyra in Little Boy, Catie Reynolds in Disturbing The Peace and Pam Harris in Out of Death.

== Career ==
Greyson made her film debut as Lana in Return to the Hiding Place (a.k.a. War of Resistance). In 2013, she took the lead role in historical drama Alone yet Not Alone directed by George Escobar, where she played Barbara, who was captured and later adopted as Susquehanna by the Delaware Tribe of Indians during the French and Indian War.

In 2014, Greyson was cast for the role of a young socialite and CIA agent in the spy thriller Double Identity. In 2015, she played a role of Sheila in Woodlawn, a 2015 American Christian sports drama film directed by the Erwin brothers. The same year she appeared as Tyra in Little Boy and starred as Jocelyn Stewart in To Have and To Hold, a drama film.

In 2017, Greyson played Maggie in Broken Memories, an independent romantic-drama about the main hero Jasper's struggle with Alzheimer’s and his relations with the family and friends. The film received two awards from The IndieFEST Film Awards.

In 2020, Greyson played Catie Reynolds in Disturbing the Peace, directed by York Alec Shackleton and starring Guy Pearce. Most recently, Greyson appeared in The Fortress, The Fortress 2 and Out of Death starring Bruce Willis.

Since 2017, Kelly Greyson has been actively involved in civil campaigns to end violence against women and collaborating with PNG Tribal Foundation, a non-governmental charity organization based in Papua New Guinea.

== Filmography ==
Key
†	Denotes films that have not yet been released

Year	Title	Role	Notes
2011	Return to the Hiding Place	Lana	a.k.a. War of Resistance
2013	Alone yet Not Alone	Barbara/ Susquehanna	
~~2014~~	To Have and To Hold	Jocelyn Stewart	never released
~~2014~~	Nameless	Paxton's Neighbor	never completed
2015	Little Boy	Tyra	
2015	Woodlawn	Sheila	
2017	Broken Memories	Maggie	
2020	Disturbing the Peace	Catie Reynolds	
2021	Out of Death	Pam Harris	
2021	Fortress	Kate Taylor	
2022	Fortress: Sniper's Eye	Kate Taylor	
2024	Sleeping Dogs	Emily Dietz	
2025	High Rollers	Bella	
2026	Gym Rat	Fit client	screened at IdyllWild International Festival of Cinema
