= Fortress (2021 film) =

2021 American film by James Cullen Bressack

- Theatrical release poster
- Directed by: James Cullen Bressack
- Screenplay by: Alan Horsnail
- Story by: Emile Hirsch; Randall Emmett
- Produced by: Randall Emmett; George Furla; Chad A. Verdi; Luillo Ruiz
- Starring: Jesse Metcalfe; Bruce Willis; Chad Michael Murray; Kelly Greyson; Ser'Darius Blain; Michael Sirow; Shannen Doherty; Katalina Viteri
- Cinematography: Bryan Koss
- Edited by: R.J. Cooper
- Music by: Timothy Stuart Jones
- Production companies: Grindstone Entertainment Group; Sherborne Media; Paprika Financing; The Pimienta Film Co.; Verdi Productions; SSS Entertainment; SSS Film Capital
- Distributed by: Lionsgate Films
- Release date: December 17, 2021
- Running time: 98 minutes
- Country: United States
- Language: English
- Box office: $52,169

Fortress is a 2021 American action film directed by James Cullen Bressack and written by Alan Horsnail, based on a story by Emile Hirsch and Randall Emmett. It stars Jesse Metcalfe, Bruce Willis, Chad Michael Murray, Kelly Greyson, Ser'Darius Blain, and Shannen Doherty. The film was released in select theaters and on video on demand by Lionsgate Films on December 17, 2021.

== Plot ==
Robert lives in a top-secret resort for retired U.S. intelligence officers. His son Paul tracks him down to the facility after 3 years of not seeing or hearing from him. He pitches his crypto currency company to him telling him that he needs $5 million to make it cash positive. He needs him to sign a document to release money from his mom's estate to him. Unbeknown to him his dad has been following his son's life and career. Balzary and his group of criminals infiltrate the resort and follow Robert and Paul into a high-tech bunker called the fortress, killing all the guards. They tie them up. Balzary says a group of Russians have kidnapped his wife and he needs the money that Robert stole from him for her release. Robert has invested it in Crypto currency. He has his son memorise the code saying he must remember the number exactly as it could save his life.

== Cast ==
- Jesse Metcalfe as Paul Michaels
- Bruce Willis as Robert Michaels
- Chad Michael Murray as Frederick Balzary
- Kelly Greyson as Kate Taylor
- Ser'Darius Blain as Ulysses
- Michael Sirow as Ken Blain
- Shannen Doherty as Brigadier General Barbara Dobbs
- Katalina Viteri as Sophia
- Natalie Burn as Sandra
- Luis Da Silva Jr. as Axel
- Sean Kanan as Vlad
- Lauren Schiff as Garner

== Production ==
Filming began on May 3, 2021, in Puerto Rico. The film was announced that same day as the first part in a duology of films starring Jesse Metcalfe, Bruce Willis, Chad Michael Murray, and Kelly Greyson. The second film, titled Fortress: Sniper's Eye, was shot back-to-back with the first; production on the second film concluded on November 3, 2021. On May 15, 2021, director James Cullen Bressack said filming on the first film had wrapped.

== Release ==
The film was released in select theaters and on video on demand by Lionsgate Films on December 17, 2021.

=== Box office ===
As of August 27, 2022, Fortress grossed $52,169 in the United Arab Emirates and Portugal.

=== Critical reception ===
On the review aggregator website Rotten Tomatoes, 20% of 5 critics' reviews are positive, with an average rating of 4.9/10. At the 42nd Golden Raspberry Awards, the film received a nomination in a new category: Worst Performance by Bruce Willis in a 2021 Movie. The category was later rescinded after Willis' retirement due to aphasia.

Film Threat writes "Fortress moves at a slick pace, and its action scenes are most thrilling. While the story is standard issue, the actors are having fun, and the whole affair looks better than the budget would suggest. All action film lovers would do well to seek this out as soon as possible."

Amy Nicholson of The New York Times wrote "The prolific action director James Cullen Bressack spits out cheap thrillers like bullet casings. His latest sneer-em-up is Fortress, and in it, there are two heists afoot. The first concerns the plot."

== Accolades ==
Award	Category	Nominee(s)	Result	Ref.
Golden Raspberry Awards	Worst Performance by Bruce Willis in a 2021 Movie	Bruce Willis	Rescinded	

== Sequel ==
In 2022, a sequel titled Fortress: Sniper's Eye was released, directed by Josh Sternfeld. Metcalfe, Willis and Murray reprise their respective roles, and Natali Yura appears as Sasha, Frederick Balzary's wife.
