= Advent Film Group =

American production company

- Type: Filmmaking
- Founded: 2007
- Founder: George Escobar, Michael Snyder
- Headquarters: United States, Purcellville, Virginia
- Website: AdventFilmGroup.com

Advent Film Group (Advent) is an independent Christian film production and distribution company founded in 2007 by George D. Escobar and Michael Snyder. The company trains young Christians to be filmmakers. Advent's films include the 2009 drama Come What May, which starred Kenneth Jezek and his wife, Karen Jezek, and the 2014 drama Alone yet Not Alone, which was a work-for-hire project for Enthuse Entertainment.

Advent Film Group has been endorsed by Michael Farris, founder and chancellor of Patrick Henry College (PHC); Graham Walker, president of PHC; and Michael Smith, president of Home School Legal Defense Association (HSLDA).

== History ==
=== Founding ===
When George Escobar (former Vice President of Product Development for Discovery, executive director for AOL/Time Warner) attended the 2006 San Antonio Independent Christian Film Festival, he met and spoke with Stephen Kendrick, co-founder of Sherwood Pictures (Courageous, Fireproof, Facing the Giants). In January 2007, Escobar founded Advent Film Group, basing out of northern Virginia.

=== Come What May ===
Their first feature film, Come What May (formerly Moot Courting), was a collaborative effort between Advent and PHC. The story follows two PHC students who attempt to overturn Roe v. Wade at the American Collegiate Moot Court Association National Championship. Forty homeschooled students served on the cast and crew alongside a handful of industry professionals. Students learned not only about production, but also the business, legal, financial, marketing, and distribution process involved in making and releasing a full-length movie.

Come What May was released on DVD in the spring of 2009, and, due to its strong anti-abortion message, quickly became a popular film for church screenings.

=== Alone yet Not Alone ===
Advent's first for-hire project was Alone yet Not Alone, produced by Enthuse Entertainment and co-produced by Advent founders, George Escobar (who also co-wrote and co-directed the film) and Michael Snyder. Alone yet Not Alone is based on the true story of Barbara and Regina Leininger, who were taken captive by the Delaware Indians in 1755 during the French and Indian War. The novelization of the story, upon which the film is based, was written by a descendant of the Leiningers, Tracy Leininger Craven. Principal photography took place at historical locations in Virginia, Tennessee, North Carolina, and Pennsylvania.

Alone yet Not Alone received a limited release on September 27, 2013, on 11 screens across the country through a unique distribution platform, Seazty, founded in 2013. Seatzy posts information and trailers about its films on its website, encouraging movie-goers to reserve tickets several weeks in advance. If 500 tickets are pre-sold in a certain area, Seatzy uses the guaranteed ticket sales to entice a local theater into showing the movie for at least one week. In this limited, week-long release, Alone Yet Not Alone garnered one of the best per-screen averages for an independent, faith-based film, due to its pre-sold tickets.

In January 2014, Alone yet Not Alone received an Academy Award nomination for Best Original Song. The titular song, written by 10-time Emmy Award-winning composer, Bruce Broughton (who previously received an Oscar nomination for Silverado) and Dennis Spiegel, is sung by quadriplegic inspirational speaker, Joni Eareckson Tada. Two weeks after the nomination, the Academy of Motion Picture Arts and Sciences rescinded the nomination, claiming Broughton had violated ethics rules by emailing voters about the song prior to the nomination. The controversial decision by the academy drew some accusations that the film was targeted for being both small-budget and Christian, as proponents of other Oscar-nominated projects have engaged in similar behavior to no consequence.

Alone yet Not Alone received a wide release on June 13, 2014, across 103 screens nationally, finishing fourteenth in nationwide box office sales on its opening weekend and third in average per screen box office sales.

== Current projects ==
=== Hero ===
Advent's most recently released film is Hero (formerly One Good Man). Co-written and directed by Manny Edwards, the family-friendly movie follows Little League coach Joe Finn (Burgess Jenkins), whose broken relationship with his son fills him with determination to make a difference in the lives of the fathers and sons in his town. He forms a youth baseball team designed to involve both fathers and sons in a common effort; Joe's persistent actions affect everyone from the local prison inmates to fathers and sons in neighboring towns.

Eighty cast and crewmembers, along with 250 families and volunteers, converged on Winston-Salem, North Carolina, for three weeks of principal photography and a week for pickups and reshoots.

=== The Screenwriters ===
The Screenwriters (formerly Writers’ Block) is a full-length feature film and the inaugural film of Advent's Advent Associates Film Program, which seeks to advance the careers of young filmmakers by putting those who have worked on previous Advent productions in leadership positions. The story follows two 1940s screenwriters, down-and-out veteran, Stu Harvey (Jeff Rose ), and eager newcomer, Chip Leninskovich (Jason Burkey ), who have 24 hours to write a full-length screenplay or be fired. The screenplay was written by 18-year-old Elizabeth Stinnette based on a story by George Escobar and filmed in Purcellville, Virginia on a production budget of $20,000.

== Filmography ==
- Alone yet Not Alone (2014)
- Hero (2014)
- The Screenwriters (post-production)
- Red September (in development)
