= The Enforcer (2022 film) =

- Directed by: Richard Hughes
- Written by: W. Peter Iliff
- Produced by: Yariv Lerner; Rob Van Norden; Natalie Burn; Lee Weldon; Jeffrey Greenstein; Jonathan Yunger
- Starring: Antonio Banderas; Kate Bosworth; Mojean Aria
- Cinematography: Callan Green
- Edited by: Damian F. Gomez; Mattias Morheden
- Music by: Giorgio Giampà
- Production company: Millennium Media
- Distributed by: Screen Media
- Release date: 22 September 2022
- Running time: 90 minutes
- Country: United States
- Languages: English; Spanish

The Enforcer is a 2022 American action thriller film directed by Richard Hughes, starring Antonio Banderas, Kate Bosworth and Mojean Aria. An enforcer tries to take down his own mob when a runaway he is protecting is kidnapped and trafficked for cyber sex.

== Cast ==
- Antonio Banderas as Cuda
- Kate Bosworth as Estelle
- Mojean Aria as Stray
- Alexis Ren as Lexus
- Zolee Griggs as Billie
- 2 Chainz as Freddie
- Mark Smith as Doom
- Luke Bouchier as Paycheck
- Aaron Cohen as Joe
- Kika Georgiou as Medina
- Kostas Sommer as Ronnie Fedec
- Christos Vasilopoulos as Silvio
- Vivian Milkova as Lola
- Natalie Burn as Olivia

== Release ==
The film premiered in select theatres and On Demand in the United States on 23 September 2022.

== Reception ==
On the review aggregator website Rotten Tomatoes, 32% of 22 critics' reviews are positive. Metacritic, which uses a weighted average, assigned the film a score of 38 out of 100, based on 8 critics, indicating "generally unfavorable" reviews.

Dennis Harvey of Variety called the film "stylish but shallow" and praised the performance of Banderas. Dustin Chase of The Daily News graded the film a "D-" and called it a "cheap film that never tries to make the most of a limited budget." Tara McNara of Common Sense Media rated the film 2 stars out of 5 and wrote that while it "isn't a great film by any stretch of the imagination", it has "exciting" adjustments and has "some heart".

Sumner Forbes of Film Threat gave the film a score of 5.5/10 and wrote that it "struggles to set itself apart from the crowded pack." Julian Roman of MovieWeb wrote that the film "surpasses typical genre films with a modicum of depth."
