= Mamula (film) =

- Original theatrical poster from Serbia
- Directed by: Milan Todorovic
- Written by: Marko Backovic (story)
- Screenplay by: Barry Keating; Milan Konjević
- Starring: Kristina Klebe; Dragan Micanovic; Natalie Burn; Miodrag Krstovic; Franco Nero
- Distributed by: Epic Pictures Group
- Release dates: March 8, 2014 (Serbia); September 9, 2014 (United States)
- Running time: 95 min
- Country: Serbia
- Language: English

Mamula (also known as Nymph, Dark Sea, and Killer Mermaid for international markets) is a Serbian-American fantasy drama-thriller film.

== Plot ==
The story begins with Ana and Sergei, a couple on vacation in Montenegro. That night, Ana initiates sex with Sergei. As she undresses, Sergei is charmed after hearing the siren's song which he follows into the water where he drowns. Ana, witnessing this, is frightened, and calls for help only to be bludgeoned to death by an unknown assailant with an anchor and her corpse is last seen being dragged away by the killer.

The next day, two American women, Lucy and Kelly, are visiting their friend and vacationing in Montenegro, meet Alex and Yasmin on the way, right as Kelly sees a fisherman on a boat. When they go island hopping and swimming in the sea they meet Boban, who is swimming as well. As they are drinking they talk about trying to explore the island, Mamula, an ex-German soldier named Niko warns them not to go, as the island is dangerous, but they disregard his warnings. The next day, they go to Mamula where they explore the prison fortress. However, they find out that the fisherman that Kelly saw was the guardian of the island and witness him throwing a bucket full of severed hands into the well as he leaves. Kelly and Alex discover that inside the well was a girl, before the guardian attempts to kill them with a shotgun. The guardian of the prison fortress attempts to kill everyone inside and manages to injure Boban's leg, hindering his mobility.

Both Kelly and Alex try to find out about the girl inside the well. However, Alex was charmed by the siren's song which leads him to attempt to open the door. After, he and Kelly are separated as the latter opens the door and finds the girl from the well and he falls beneath the water seemingly being drowning in the process. Later, Yasmin, Lucy and Boban are trying to find a way out of the prison fortress and they discovered the guardian was another ex-German soldier who is a former comrade of Niko's who feeds the mermaid and has a list of victims stuck on his room and the place where he sharpens his anchor to butcher the victims that he killed. As the trio find Kelly, Yasmin was hit by the guardian's anchor. She is later beheaded by him in his butchering room as Boban and Lucy reunite with Kelly and they see the guardian handling Yasmin's severed head, causing them to realize that he would kill them next.

When they find Alex, they find corpses, all around the room and the girl from the well who hypnotizes Boban using her siren song, but Kelly snaps him out of it by slapping him across the face and they discover that girl from the well is actually a mermaid as the guardian hits Boban on his shoulder as they fight each other. However, both girls saw Alex's corpse floating in the sea. Lucy is later killed by the mermaid who shapeshifts into a horrible creature and drags her in the water and is stabbed from her tail, leaving Kelly helpless and Boban manages to kill the guardian who is severely injured. He and Kelly leave as the mermaid comes to her lover's corpse which she screams in anguish as she is able to resurrect his life. By the time Kelly and Boban tries to get out of the prison fortess as they found the map to escape. The resurrected guardian pursues both and they were later saved by Niko who warned them earlier about the island. Niko finally explains to them that Mamula island is one of the cursed islands where the mermaids made their sanctuary in that island and the girl from the well that they saw earlier is named Scylla, a mermaid who resides underneath the prison fortress and the one responsible for killing Lucy. However, one of his men (the guardian) was in love with Scylla who was thought to be dead and Niko realized that he was alive and Scylla had kept him alive due to her affection for him. He kills people in Montenegro in order to feed their corpses to Scylla. Niko sensed that Scylla had gone after them and she attacks the boat in her creature form.

Scylla manages to kill Boban with her siren's song after she drags him beneath the sea. Kelly and Niko are the only remaining survivors to fight her after which Scylla attempts to drag Niko to the watery depths and Kelly manages to stab her with a spear. Scylla later attacks Kelly who is injured, Niko manages to catch her with a net. Scylla reverts back to her mermaid form where she sings her siren song to Niko who is hypnotized by her song and Kelly manages to snap him out of it by slapping his face several times and Niko snaps out of the trance and stabs Scylla with the spear, killing her. The guardian of Mamula arrives and is devastated to see that his lover is dead and as he mourns her loss, Niko tells him that it was for what he had done after he killed just for Scylla. Then, he senses that several mermaids are coming to get them in Montenegro knowing that they are here to take revenge against those who kill one of their kind. The movie ends with Niko killing the guardian with his own anchor.

== Cast ==
- Kristina Klebe as Kelly
- Dragan Mićanović as Boban
- Natalie Burn as Lucy
- Miodrag Krstović as the guardian
- Franco Nero as Niko
- Slobodan Stefanović as Alex
- Sofija Rajović as Yasmin
- Jelena Rakočević as Ana
- Janko Cekić as Sergi
- Zorana Kostić Obradović as Scylla, the siren
  - Mina Sablić as Scylla in creature form

== Production ==
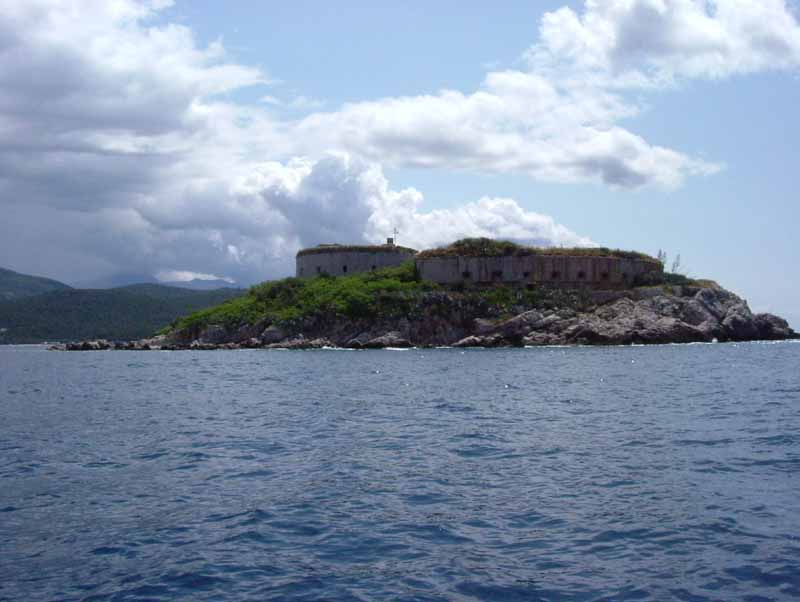
The island where filming took place

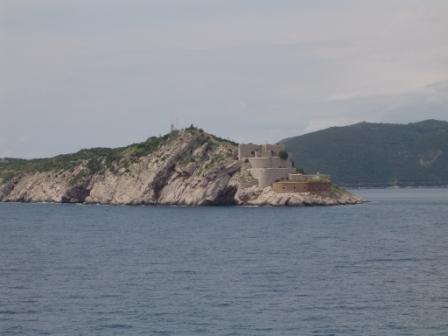
The location for the fortress where Scylla was found

Mamula was filmed on the island of the same name.
