= Rites of Passage (2012 film) =

- Directed by: W. Peter Iliff
- Written by: W. Peter Iliff; Rick Halsey
- Produced by: Mark Canton; David Hopwood; William D. Johnson; Jonathan Sachar
- Starring: Wes Bentley; Kate Maberly; Ryan Donowho; Christian Slater; Stephen Dorff
- Cinematography: Alex Nepomniaschy
- Edited by: Glenn Garland
- Music by: Elia Cmiral
- Production company: Voltage Pictures
- Release date: October 16, 2012
- Country: United States
- Language: English

Rites of Passage is a 2012 American thriller film written and directed by W. Peter Iliff. The film stars Wes Bentley, Kate Maberly, Ryan Donowho, Christian Slater and Stephen Dorff.

== Plot ==
Nathan (Ryan Donowho), a studious anthropology student, decries his position in a society that fails to provide a ceremony to mark his transition into manhood. Professor Nash (Stephen Dorff), an unethical teacher who openly pursues sexual liaisons with his female students, is intrigued when Nathan tells him his family's unoccupied but functional ranch is the site of an ancient Indian burial ground. Nathan convinces Professor Nash to bring the class out to the ranch, where the plan is to hold a spiritual ceremony in a sweat lodge built over the burial site. Encouraged by Nash's enthusiastic agreement to the idea, Nathan guides his stressed, party-going classmates to the ranch. There they meet his brother, Benny (Wes Bentley), who is in a psychotic spiral of drug addiction and guilt.

A crystal meth cook at the ranch, Delgado (Christian Slater), a man with a grudge who has an uneasy friendship with the brother, kills two of the students after he and the brother are insulted. Delgado then begins hunting the rest of the group. During his rampage, Delgado hallucinates that a stuffed monkey named Pancho that clings to his shotgun talks and makes futile attempts to reason with his apparently absent sense of morality.

== Cast ==
- Wes Bentley as Benny
- Kate Maberly as Dani
- Ryan Donowho as Nathan
- Christian Slater as Delgado
- Stephen Dorff as Professor Nash
- Briana Evigan as Penelope
- Travis Van Winkle as Hart
- Carly Schroeder as Carly
- Ashley Hinshaw as Sandee
- Guy Burnet as Mojo

== Release ==
The film was released straight-to-DVD on October 16, 2012. The trailer for the film was released on late 2011, and can be viewed on the official Rites of Passage website, Facebook page, and YouTube.

The film premiered at the Isla Vista Theatre in Isla Vista, Calif. The audience responded enthusiastically, except for about a half dozen Native American activists who appeared at the showing to protest. During the subsequent Q&A, the activists accused the film of being racist, exploitative, a mockery of Chumash rituals, and "cultural prostitution." However, actor Mylo IronBear, a Native American spirit warrior of the Spirit Lake Tribe, who appears as a Chumash in the film, disagreed with the activists. "I am standing behind this film because it’s a film,” IronBear said, adding that Iliff was entitled to his artistic interpretation.

A member of the Chumash tribe stood up after the activists were removed by police and apologized for their behavior, indicating that they did not represent the Chumash Nation. The Chumash jimsonweed ceremony portrayed in the film was accurately represented according to anthropologist J.P. Harrington's extensive field notes from Chumash informants in the early 1900s.
