= How I Got Lost =

2009 American film

- Directed by: Joe Leonard
- Starring: Aaron Stanford; Jacob Fishel; Rosemarie DeWitt
- Music by: Kaki King
- Release date: 2009
- Country: United States

How I Got Lost is a 2009 American film that premiered at the Newport Beach Film Festival, the St. Louis International Film Festival and Austin Film Festival. It was written and directed by Joe Leonard, and stars Aaron Stanford, Jacob Fishel, and Rosemarie DeWitt. The film was scored by Golden Globe award nominated musician Kaki King. It was shot with the Red camera on location in the East Village, Manhattan and in Kirkwood, Missouri. Unique in its bookending of two transformative events in New York City: the September 11, 2001 attacks and Northeast Blackout of 2003.

== Plot ==
The story involves a young disillusioned banker (Aaron Stanford) as seen through the eyes of his sportswriting best friend (Jacob Fishel), who has emotionally withdrawn since September 11, 2001 and the end of his post-9/11 relationship. When the two decide to leave town, the film becomes a road movie about the hidden gifts of getting lost.
