= Aban and Khorshid =

- Film poster
- Directed by: Darwin Serink
- Written by: Darwin Serink
- Produced by: Tommee May; Christofer Leggett; Darwin Serink; Candace Silvers; Anna Brunoro (executive); Brendan Filuk (executive)
- Starring: Mojean Aria; Bobby Naderi
- Cinematography: Jason McCormick
- Edited by: Alison Carter
- Music by: Sage Lewis
- Production companies: Rude Truth; Delirio Films; Come What May Productions
- Release date: 23 May 2014 (Seattle)
- Running time: 13 minutes
- Country: United States
- Language: Persian

Aban and Khorshid (original title – Aban + Khorshid) is a 2014 American gay drama film written and directed by Darwin Serink.

The short film included in the DVD Boys On Film 14: Worlds Collide.

== Plot ==
Aban and Khorshid, an Iranian gay couple, are in adjacent prison cells, imprisoned and sentenced to death for their relationship. Flashbacks show Khorshid recording Aban, asking him to say his name and to sing, which Aban does. He asks Khorshid to tell him how they first met; on Chaharshanbe Suri, when Khorshid and some others were lighting a fire, Aban appeared "out of nowhere".

Back in their cells, Khorshid asks Aban what superpower he would like to have, and says he'd like to fly. Aban recalls sipping tea and pretending to be a vampire, using cucumbers as fangs. After remembering this, he complains about being hungry, so Khorshid pretends to order food for the both of them. The couple is shown having sex. Aban asks what it will be like after they die; Khorshid answers that nothing will happen afterwards, and nobody will bother them. Aban stares out of his cell's window and remembers Khorshid laughing and joking about his large appetite. However, the couple's joyful moment is interrupted by police breaking into their home and violently arresting them. Khorshid passes Aban a photograph of the two, who in the photo are a glowing white dot.

Aban and Khorshid, both blindfolded, are roughly taken out of a truck and led to the gallows, where they will be publicly hanged. On the gallows, Aban answers Khorshid's question about superpowers, saying that he would also like to fly. He begins to break down, begging to have his blindfold removed so he can look at Khorshid one last time. To calm Aban, Khorshid tells him to "grab his wing". They hold each other's bound hands, but lose their grip.

== Cast ==
- Mojean Aria as Aban
- Bobby Naderi as Khorshid
- Stahaub Roudbari as Break in Guard
- Hamid Nayini as Guard #2
- Arash Rahdari as Guard #3
- Shahaub Roudbari as Execution Guard #1
- Homayoon Doroodian as Execution Guard #2

== Participation in international festivals and awards ==
2014:

- Casting Society of America (US)
- Image Out, The Rochester LGBT Film & Video Festival (US) -- Jury Award Winners: Best Short Film
- Iris Prize Festival – Cardiff (UK) – Highly Commended
- Long Island Gay & Lesbian Film Festival (US) – Short Film Awards: Men's – Jury Award, Audience Award
- Outfest (US) – Best of Fest
- Palm Springs International Film Festival (US) – Best of Fest
- SIFF, Seattle International Film Festival (US) – ShortsFest Award Winners: Live Action, Special Jury Mention, and Golden Space Needle Award – Best Short Film, Fourth runner-up

2015:

- Cannes Emerging Filmmakers Showcase, American Pavilion (France) – LGBTQ Showcase – winner
- CIFF 39, Cleveland International Film Festival (US) – Best LGBT Short
- GAZE International LGBT Film Festival – Dublin (Ireland) – Best International Short – Winner

== Reviews ==
- "This is my first film at PSSF and it’s been great! I’ve been blown away by people’s responses to the film. I love watching it with an audience, hearing the heavy silences, hearing the focused attention, hearing the tears, hearing the hope..." (Tommee May, 2014-07-14).
- "Two Lovers, Even in Death" (Amos Lassen, 2016-02-15).
