= Aaron Cohen (actor) =

American-Canadian actor and pundit

- אהרון כהן
- Born: 28 February 1976 (age 50); Montreal, Canada
- Occupations: writer, director, actor, celebrity bodyguard, on-camera news commentator
- Parent: Abby Mann (father)

Aaron Cohen (Hebrew: אהרון כהן; born 28 February 1976 in Montreal) is an American-Canadian actor, ex-Israeli special forces agent, and counterterrorism analyst best known for his on-camera appearances on various major news cable programs.

== Early life and education ==
Cohen was born to a Jewish family in Montreal, Quebec. His parents divorced when he was young and the family moved to Miami and settled in Los Angeles. He then spent the next several years shuttling between California, Canada, and Florida. For secondary school he attended the Robert Land Academy, a military academy in Canada, and graduated Beverly Hills High School in 1995.

He is the stepson of the American filmmaker Abby Mann.

== Military Service ==
After high school, Cohen left Los Angeles for Israel, working on a kibbutz before enlisting in the Israel Defense Forces. After passing the consolidation, a demanding screening process for elite unit candidates, Cohen was one of the few non-Sabra volunteers accepted. In the mid-1990s, he became a member of the undercover Duvdevan Unit (Hebrew: דובדבן; lit. cherry) of the IDF Commando Brigade, performing counter-terror operations targeting suspects among the Palestinian Arab population in the West Bank. He has stated his belief in Zionism and has said his family has a strong Jewish identity.

== Post Military ==
After his service, Cohen returned to Los Angeles and founded IMS Security Consultants, Inc., a Hollywood VIP protection service that has done security work for Hollywood actors, VIPs, rock stars and dignitaries, as well as providing tactical counter-terrorist and "active shooter" training to vetted members of local, State and Federal law enforcement as well as police SWAT teams and the U.S. military Special Forces.

=== Film and television ===
Cohen got his Hollywood start tech advising for numerous films including Steven Soderbergh's Haywire and providing tactical training for actors including Keanu Reeves for the John Wick franchise, and quickly transitioned into acting, supporting in various film and TV projects including 211 with Nicolas Cage, Rambo 5: Last Blood with Sylvester Stallone and a recurring role on the Netflix series Luis Miguel. In 2022 he was cast in a supporting role opposite Antonio Banderas in the crime thriller The Enforcer.

=== UCLA Gaza encampment ===
In May 2024, Cohen claimed that he "ran a quiet infiltration operation" into the pro-Palestinian solidarity encampment at UCLA. He then spoke about his experience on Fox News.
