= Aaron Stanford =

American actor (born 1976)

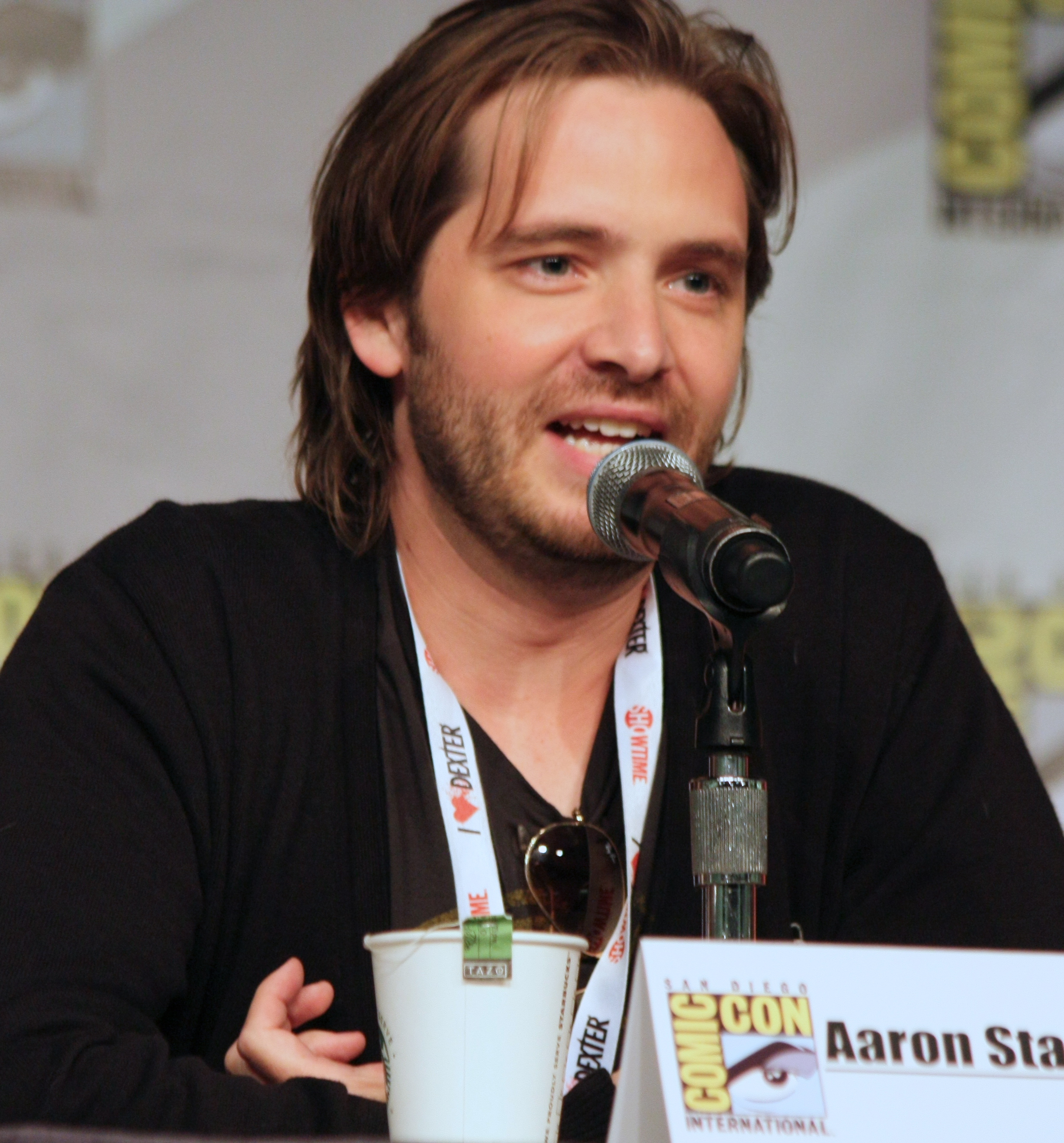
- Stanford in 2013
- Born: December 27, 1976 (age 49); Westford, Massachusetts, U.S.
- Education: State University of New York, Purchase; Rutgers University, New Brunswick (BFA)
- Occupation: Actor
- Years active: 2001–present

Aaron Stanford (born December 27, 1976) is an American actor known for his roles as Pyro in the X-Men films X2 (2003), X-Men: The Last Stand (2006) and Deadpool & Wolverine (2024), and Doug in the remake of The Hills Have Eyes (2006). On television, he also starred as Birkhoff in Nikita (2010–2013) and as James Cole in 12 Monkeys (2015–2018), based on the 1995 film of the same name.

== Early life and education ==
Stanford was born in Westford, Massachusetts, the son of Judith (née Dupras), an English professor, and Don Stanford, who works in publishing. His brother David is a musician. Stanford attended Westford Academy in Westford Massachusetts for high school and met his first acting teacher there. He initially attended SUNY Purchase, but transferred to Rutgers University Mason Gross School of Arts. He graduated in 2000, magna cum laude.

== Career ==
Stanford's first major film role was in the low-budget indie film Tadpole (2002), in which he portrays Oscar Grubman, a precocious 15-year-old with a crush on his stepmother, played by Sigourney Weaver. For this performance he earned a nomination for the Golden Satellite Award. In 2001 and 2002 he appeared multiple times on the television series Third Watch as Russian teen Sergei. That same year, he was named as one of Daily Variety's "Top Ten Actors to Watch" and included on Entertainment Weekly's "It List". In 2004 he appeared in Christopher Shinn's play Where Do We Live at the Vineyard Theatre. Stanford also starred as Anthony LaPaglia's son in the 2004 film Winter Solstice.

Director Bryan Singer was impressed with Stanford's performance in Tadpole, and cast him as Pyro in the 2003 blockbuster X2, a sequel to X-Men. He continued the role in the third installment, X-Men: The Last Stand, released in May 2006. Both movies are based on the Marvel Comics series X-Men.

Stanford also starred in ABC's midseason replacement Traveler, a drama about two friends who believe they are set up by their good friend (Stanford) to make them look like the conspirators of a terrorist attack.

Stanford appeared in the 2006 remake of Wes Craven's The Hills Have Eyes. He also won the "One To Watch" award at the 2006 Young Hollywood Awards. And in that same year, he starred in the New Hampshire–based comedy, Live Free or Die, playing a wannabe tough-guy criminal named John Rudgate. Aaron also was the voice actor for Pvt. Polonsky in Call of Duty: World at War. In 2009, he played a troubled poker genius in a season eight episode of Law & Order: Criminal Intent, as well as Horace Cook Jr. in an episode of AMC's acclaimed show Mad Men. In 2010, he joined the CW's Nikita as Birkhoff. His character from the film The Hills Have Eyes appears in the 2012 video game Call of Duty: Black Ops II via Zombies Mode.

Stanford played the lead role of James Cole in the television adaptation of the movie 12 Monkeys, which premiered in January 2015 on Syfy. He also was cast in the AMC series Fear the Walking Dead as the recurring character Jim, first appearing in the episode that aired on August 26, 2018.

In 2024, Stanford reprised his role as Pyro in the Marvel Studios film Deadpool & Wolverine. His character has a far more prominent role than he did in X2 or The Last Stand, acting as one of Cassandra Nova's right-hand men. In an interview with Entertainment Weekly, Stanford said that he was "shocked and thrilled" to get the call to return and also voiced his delight at getting to wear a superhero costume, something he did not get to do in either of his previous performances. "In the original X-Men films, Pyro gets really shortchanged in terms of a costume", he told EW. "In X2 [...] the SWAT team bursts in in the middle of the night and we have to flee. So for half the movie, I'm in my jammies. [...] And in X3, I was just dressed in an ensemble from Hot Topic [...] to have [Pyro] be in a proper superhero costume that was actually taken from the comics themselves was very cool."

== Filmography ==
=== Film ===
Year	Title	Role	Notes
2002	Tadpole	Oscar Grubman	Nominated—Best Performance by an Actor in a Motion Picture, Comedy or Musical—Satellite Award
2002	Hollywood Ending	Actor	
2002	25th Hour	Marcuse	
2003	X2	John Allerdyce / Pyro	
2003	Rick	Duke	
2004	Winter Solstice	Gabe Winters	
2004	Spartan	Michael Blake	
2005	Runaway	Michael Adler	
2005	Standing Still	Rich	
2006	The Hills Have Eyes	Doug Bukowski	Bloodiest Beatdown—Fangoria Chainsaw Award
2006	Live Free or Die	John "Rugged" Rudgate	
2006	X-Men: The Last Stand	John Allerdyce / Pyro	
2007	Flakes	Neal Downs	
2007	The Cake Eaters	Dwight "Beagle" Kimbrough	
2008	Holy Money	Anthony	
2008	How I Got Lost	Andrew Peterson	NY Emerging Talent Award—Big Apple Film Festival
2016	We've Forgotten More Than We Ever Knew	Daniel	
2017	Furthest Witness	Kyle Braddock	
2017	Clinical	Miles Richardson	
2020	Horse Girl	Hades	
2023	Finestkind	Skeemo	
2024	Deadpool & Wolverine	John Allerdyce / Pyro	

=== Television ===
Year	Title	Role	Notes
2001–2002	Third Watch	Sergei	5 episodes
2007	Traveler	Will Traveler	8 episodes
2007	Numb3rs	Brett Chandler	Episode: "Hollywood Homicide"
2009	Law & Order: Criminal Intent	Josh Snow	Episode: "All In"
2009	Mad Men	Horace Cook Jr.	Episode: "The Arrangements"
2009	Fear Itself	Stephen	Episode: "Echoes"
2010–2013	Nikita	Seymour Birkhoff / Lionel Peller	Main role, 64 episodes
2015–2018	12 Monkeys	James Cole	Lead role, 47 episodes
2016	Comedy Bang! Bang!	Tom Holtby / Johnny Appleseed	2 episodes
2018	Fear the Walking Dead	Jim Brauer	6 episodes
2020	Perry Mason	George Gannon	4 episodes
2022	Westworld	Peter Myers	2 episodes
2023	Star Trek: Picard	Sneed	Episode: "Disengage"
2025	Tracker	Ricky	Episode: "Nightingale"
2025	Criminal Minds	Kyle Mackey	2 episodes
2025	Invasion	Pastor Allen	Episode: "Marilyn"
2026	Chicago Fire	Thomas Marr	Episode: "Reckoning, Part I"
2026	Chicago Med	Thomas Marr	Episode: "Reckoning, Part II"
2026	Chicago P.D.	Thomas Marr	Episode: "Reckoning, Part III"
2026	CIA	Robert Davis	Episode: "Rare Earth"

=== Video games ===
Year	Title	Voice role	Notes
2008	Call of Duty: World at War	Private Polonsky	
