= Fortress: Sniper's Eye =

2022 American film by Josh Sternfeld

- Theatrical release poster
- Directed by: Josh Sternfeld
- Screenplay by: Alan Horsnail
- Story by: Emile Hirsch; Randall Emmett
- Produced by: Randall Emmett; George Furla; Chad A. Verdi; Luillo Ruiz
- Starring: Jesse Metcalfe; Bruce Willis; Chad Michael Murray
- Cinematography: Vern Nobles, Jr.
- Edited by: Evan Ahlgren
- Music by: Jacob Bunton
- Production companies: Grindstone Entertainment Group; Sherborne Media; Paprika Financing; The Pimienta Film Co.; Verdi Productions; SSS Entertainment; SSS Film Capital
- Distributed by: Lionsgate Films
- Release date: April 29, 2022
- Running time: 87 minutes
- Country: United States
- Language: English
- Box office: $69,075

Fortress: Sniper's Eye (also known as Fortress 2) is a 2022 American action film directed by Josh Sternfeld as a sequel to Fortress (2021). It stars Jesse Metcalfe, Bruce Willis, and Chad Michael Murray. The film was released on April 29, 2022, by Lionsgate Films.

== Premise ==
Weeks after the events of the first film, Robert Michaels enacts a rescue attempt of the widow of his deceased nemesis, Frederick Balzary. However, when Sasha appears to have nefarious plans of her own and Balzary is revealed to be alive, Robert and his son Paul must work together to stop them.

== Cast ==
- Jesse Metcalfe as Paul Michaels
- Bruce Willis as Robert Michaels
- Chad Michael Murray as Frederick Balzary
- Natalie Burn as Sandra
- Kelly Greyson as Kate Taylor
- Ser'Darius Blain as Ulysses
- Michael Sirow as Ken Blain
- Welker White as Carole Taylor
- Natali Yura as Sasha
- Gabrielle Haugh as Zoe
- Leslee Emmett as Marcia
- Larken Woodward as Janice
- Leonardo Castro as Madris
- Rainier Quintana as Denton

== Production ==
Fortress 2 was announced on May 3, 2021, as a sequel to Fortress. Principal photography began in Puerto Rico in May 2021. Filming for Fortress 2 wrapped by November 2021. A first-look image was released at the 2021 American Film Market, where Highland Film Group was looking to sell the film's distribution rights in the United States and Canada. Fortress: Sniper's Eye is one of the last films to star Willis, who retired from acting because he was diagnosed with frontotemporal dementia.

== Release ==
Fortress: Sniper's Eye was released on April 29, 2022, by Lionsgate Films.

=== Box office ===
As of August 27, 2022, Fortress: Sniper's Eye grossed $69,075 in the United Arab Emirates and Portugal.

=== Critical response ===
On the review aggregator website Rotten Tomatoes, 0% of 7 critics' reviews are positive, with an average rating of 2/10.

Jeannette Catsoulis, of The New York Times, gave a negative review, saying "a sequel so dumb that no effort by Willis could reasonably be expected to save it."
