= Winter Solstice (film) =

- Promotional poster
- Directed by: Josh Sternfeld
- Written by: Josh Sternfeld
- Produced by: Doug Bernheim; John Limotte
- Starring: Anthony LaPaglia; Aaron Stanford; Mark Webber
- Cinematography: Harlan Bosmajian
- Edited by: Plummy Tucker
- Music by: John Leventhal
- Distributed by: Paramount Classics
- Release dates: January 29, 2004 (Santa Barbara Film Festival); April 8, 2005 (United States)
- Running time: 89 minutes
- Country: United States
- Language: English
- Box office: $337,617

Winter Solstice is a 2004 American drama film written and directed by Josh Sternfeld and starring Anthony LaPaglia, Aaron Stanford, and Mark Webber. The story focuses on the efforts of a man to interact with and relate to his sons in the years following the accidental death of his wife.

== Plot ==
New Jersey landscape gardener Jim Winters is struggling to raise his sons, high school student Peter and older Gabe, as a single father. Gabe announces he is leaving home to move to Tampa, Florida, although he's vague about both his reason for doing so and what he plans to do there once he arrives. Instead of discussing his plans with his devoted girlfriend Stacey, he plans to drop her. Aware of what he has in mind, she quietly retreats from him to make it difficult for him to achieve his goal. Peter, who was in the car with his mother when she was killed in an accident five years earlier, is a rebellious, hearing-impaired underachiever doing poorly in school, despite the efforts of his teacher Mr. Bricker, who urges him to work harder to meet his potential.

Jim helps new neighbor Molly Ripkin move some cartons. Later she asks him and his sons to dinner. Her invitation is the catalyst that upsets the delicate equilibrium they have been maintaining as each tries to deal with his loss and painful memories in his own way.

== Cast ==
- Anthony LaPaglia as Jim Winters
- Aaron Stanford as Gabe Winters
- Mark Webber as Pete Winters
- Michelle Monaghan as Stacey
- Allison Janney as Molly Ripkin
- Ron Livingston as Mr. Bricker
- Jason Fuchs as Bob
- Rocco Rosanio as Pete's Friend #1

== Production ==
The film was shot on location in Glen Ridge, Jersey City and Oradell, New Jersey.

The soundtrack includes "The Rookie Year" by Brandtson and "Sunset Soon Forgotten" by Iron & Wine.

The film premiered at the 2004 Santa Barbara International Film Festival and was shown at the 2004 Tribeca Film Festival and the 2004 Vancouver International Film Festival before going into limited release in the United States on April 8, 2005. It opened on five screens and grossed $20,393 on its opening weekend. At its widest release in the US it played in only 39 theaters. It was featured at the Cannes Film Market and the Rio de Janeiro International Film Festival following its US release. Eventually it earned $319,355 in the US and $18,262 in foreign markets for a total worldwide box office of $337,617.

== Critical reception ==
On review aggregator Rotten Tomatoes, the film has an approval rating of 60% based on 80 reviews with an average rating of 6.4/10. The site's critical consensus is "A deliberately paced, realistic portrait of a family's grief and healing."

Dana Stevens of The New York Times called the film "the kind of ambling, event-free family drama that will either draw audiences in with its gentle, understated power or quietly bore them out of their skulls."

Roger Ebert of the Chicago Sun-Times observed, "The movie is not plot-driven, for which we must be thankful, because to force their feelings into a plot would be a form of cruelty. The whole point is that these lives have no plot. The characters and their situation are on stage and waiting for something to happen, but Josh Sternfeld, the writer-director, isn't going to let them off that easily. If this movie ended in hugs, it would be an abomination . . . Sternfeld . . . knows he will have more effect on us if he denies us closure."

Mick LaSalle of the San Francisco Chronicle called the film "a completely boring, counterfeit movie" and added, "Because everyone in Winter Solstice is miserable, because everyone is sensitive, because nothing happens, because people smile through tears and tear through smiles, and because there isn't a single explosion or car chase, there will be people who'll insist that this film is a searing examination of the human soul. In fact, it's dreadful, but it's a special kind of dreadful - the kind designed to appeal to intelligent people on principle . . . The film's depiction of middle-aged grief is antiseptic and uninformed, and its depiction of middle-aged bonding is trite and unreal."

David Rooney of Variety called the film an "accomplished debut for writer-director Josh Sternfeld . . . distinguished by its emotional integrity, sustained mood of aching melancholy and superbly understated performances." He added, "Relatively little happens in Sternfeld's screenplay, the rewards of which lie in its intelligent refusal to offer artificial, clean solutions or to broadcast the characters' conflicts in big, showy scenes. Instead, the writer-director coaxes out their fear, bitterness, hostility and sorrow through small revelations or telling silences."

== DVD release ==
The Region 1 DVD was released on September 13, 2005. The film is in anamorphic widescreen format with an audiotrack and subtitles in English.
