= Mojean Aria =

Australian actor, writer and producer

- Occupations: Actor; producer; writer
- Years active: 2007–present

Mojean Aria is an Australian actor, writer, producer and filmmaker.

As an actor, Mojean has worked alongside producers Peter Chernin, Jenno Topping, Mike De Luca, Aaron Ryder and others. He has starred opposite the likes of Russell Crowe, Hugh Jackman, Antonio Banderas and Jason Momoa.

== Early life and education ==
Aria first started taking acting lessons at the age of six. He attended the National Institute of Dramatic Art (NIDA) at the age of fourteen in advanced (adult) classes. In 2004 he won a scholarship to The McDonald College High School of Performing Arts.

== Career ==
In 2007 he landed a lead role in the feature film Cross Life directed by Claire McCarthy, which premiered at the Sydney Film Festival. He later relocated to Los Angeles.

In 2016, Aria starred as Steve in Call of the Void, a noir-inspired film directed by Dustin Kahia. Aria portrayed a man struggling with emotional turmoil and lost love. His performance was noted for balancing intensity and restraint, effectively conveying the character’s distress. Aria’s portrayal complemented the film’s style, fitting into its introspective atmosphere. In the same year, Mojean also starred in Hara Kiri, directed by Aitch Alberto.

In 2017, Mojean became the first ever unsigned recipient of the Heath Ledger Scholarship, as well as being the first from a multi-cultural background. The judging panel consisted of Gary Oldman and Bruna Papandrea and was backed by benefactors Michelle Williams and Nicole Kidman, among others. Kimberly Peirce, who served on the judges' panel, praised Aria's work as "rich, nuanced, precise, beautiful, authentic, emotive and fierce". In his acceptance speech, he reflected on Heath Ledger's influence on his career, recalling a childhood encounter with the late actor at a screening in Sydney. Aria credited Ledger's openness and charisma as inspirations for his artistic journey. He also acknowledged his mother's sacrifices after immigrating from Iran to build a future for their family in Australia. During the speech, Aria became emotional and was comforted on stage by Ledger's father, Kim Ledger.

In 2019, Aria starred as Gether Bax in See for Apple TV+. Set in a dystopian future where humanity has lost the ability to see, the show featured Aria as a disloyal member of his village. Aria described the production as one of the most intense experiences of his career, citing its logistical challenges and artistic ambition. He also praised the show's themes of power, vision, and diversity, noting its broader societal reflections.

GQ Magazine reported that Aria developed a professional relationship with Jason Momoa while filming See, which contributed to increased recognition for the young actor. Momoa publicly acknowledged Aria’s performance on social media, drawing attention to his work. During production, Momoa praised Aria’s dedication and performance in an intense scene they rehearsed together. He later expressed interest in working with Aria on future projects, recognizing his versatility as an actor.

That same year, Variety reported that Aria was cast in the independent immigrant drama Thief of Sleep, with filming planned in Scotland. The film, directed by Darwin Serink and co-written with Stuart Thomas, follows a young closeted gay man fleeing persecution in Iran. Producers Chelsea Winstanley and Tommee May expressed support for Aria’s casting, noting its significance in his career. Aria had previously collaborated with Serink on the short film Aban + Khorshid. However, since the initial announcement in 2019, there have been no further updates or confirmation regarding the film's production status.

In 2020, Mojean decided to take all his experience into his production company venture of Mystic Makers with his primary collaborator, screenwriter and development executive, Lauren Campi. His first project was the Hawaiian fantasy drama KaPō, which he co-produced with Chelsea Winstanley. He went on to produce several notable short films.

In 2021, Aria joined the cast of the noir thriller The Enforcer, which began filming in Thessaloniki, Greece. He starred alongside Antonio Banderas, Kate Bosworth, and 2 Chainz. The film, directed by Richard Hughes and written by W. Peter Iliff, follows an enforcer who turns against his own organisation to save a young runaway from cyber sex trafficking. Millennium Media introduced The Enforcer at the Cannes Virtual Market in June 2021.

In 2023 he co-starred in Shayda which was executive produced by Cate Blanchett. It premiered at the Sundance Film Festival where it picked up the Audience Award and he was nominated for Best Supporting Actor at th 2024 AACTA Awards.

In 2024, Mojean co-starred in The Correspondent opposite Richard Roxburgh, as the activist Alaa Abd El-Fattah.

Mojean co-stars opposite Russell Crowe in Beast in Me, directed by Tyler Atkins, co-written and produced by Crowe.

== Other activities ==
Mojean started the first scholarship for MENA actors in Australia.

== Filmography ==
=== Film ===
Year	Title	Role	Notes	Ref.
2007	Cross Life	Donald		
2009	Fate Train	Angus	Short film	
2010	Purgatory	John Everton	Short film	
2010	Surprise!	Ben	Short film	
2011	The Unforgettable Key	Logan Aria	Short film; writer and producer	
2012	Revolution	Jack	Short film	
2012	The Sweetest Chord	Jack	Short film	
2013	Avenge My Eyes	Young Ray Leonard	Short film	
2014	Aban and Khorshid	Aban	Short film	
2015	Hybrids	Blaz		
2016	Hara Kiri	Beto	Short film	
2016	The Bronx Bull	Young Jake LaMotta		
2016	Primitive Technology	Keith	Short film	
2016	Boys on Film 14: Worlds Collide	Aban		
2017	The Suitcase	Joe Franek		
2017	Call of the Void	Steve		
2019	Danger Close: The Battle of Long Tan	Second Lieutenant Gordon Sharp		
2021	Reminiscence	Sebastian Sylvan		
2022	The Enforcer	Stray		
2023	Shayda	Farhad		
2025	This Tempting Madness	Detective Colton		
2026	Beast	Malon James		

=== Television ===
Year	Title	Role	Notes	Ref.
2007	All Saints	Brett Thomas	TV series	
2018	Dead Lucky	Mani Dalir	TV Series	SBS
2019	See	Gether Bax	TV series	

== Awards and nominations ==
Year	Award	Category	Work	Result	Ref.
2017	Australians In Film	Heath Ledger Scholarship	N/A	Won	
