= Disturbing the Peace (2020 film) =

2020 film by York Shackleton

- Film poster
- Directed by: York Alec Shackleton
- Written by: Chuck Hustmyre
- Produced by: Mary Aloe; Daniel Grodnik; Michael Philip
- Starring: Guy Pearce
- Cinematography: Curtis Petersen
- Edited by: Michael Thomas James
- Music by: Michael Thomas
- Production companies: The Wonderfilm Media Corporation; Daniel Grodnik Productions; Aloe Entertainment
- Distributed by: Momentum Pictures
- Release date: January 17, 2020
- Running time: 91 minutes
- Country: Canada
- Language: English
- Box office: $49,104

Disturbing the Peace is a 2020 neo-western action thriller film directed by York Shackleton and starring Guy Pearce. The film follows a police officer who must fight back against a violent outlaw motorcycle club that takes over his small town. The film was poorly received on release.

== Plot ==
After accidentally wounding his partner during a hostage situation, Texas Ranger Jim Dillon moves to the small town of Horse Cave, Kentucky, where he works as an unarmed U.S. Marshal, assisted by one Deputy U.S. Marshal, Matt. Learning of his former partner's death, Jim falls into a depression, with the help of Catie, the town’s café server and part-time preacher, Jim gets through it.

One day, a motorcycle gang led by violent criminal Diablo (nicknamed "Scorpion") arrives in Horse Cave, seeking to rob the town's bank and ambush an armored car set to arrive in the town. When Diablo and his gang take over Horse Cave, Jim makes the decision he’s going to fight back. Diablo has taken out the power, phone lines and cell phone towers so there is no way to get word out that Jim needs backup. What he also doesn’t know is that one gang member killed a State Trooper during a traffic stop on their way into Horse Cave; now the gang can stop cars or any help from entering town. With Catie and the rest of the townspeople being held hostage in the church; Jim has to come up with a way to save the townspeople, stop the armored truck heist, stop the gang from making off with the bank’s money and stop the gang all together.

== Cast ==
- Guy Pearce as Jim Dillon
- Devon Sawa as Diablo
- Kelly Greyson as Catie Reynolds
- Paul Maddox as The Kentucky Colonel
- Jacob Grodnik as Jarhead
- Dan Southworth as Steve
- Michael Bellisario as Pyro
- Branscombe Richmond as Big Dog
- Dwayne Cameron as Diesel
- Barbie Blank as Amanda
- Jay Willick as Alex

== Reception ==
On Rotten Tomatoes, the film holds an approval rating of 20% based on 20 reviews, with an average rating of 3/10. According to Metacritic, which sampled six critics and calculated a weighted average score of 34 out of 100, the film received "generally unfavorable" reviews.

Glenn Kenny of RogerEbert.com gave the film one star, calling the film a "dull-as-dishwater, paint-by-numbers cinematic hiccup with no discernible reason for being."

Guy Pearce stated that Disturbing the Peace is one of his worst films, calling it "abysmal".
