= Natalie Burn =

American actress and film producer

- Наталі Берн
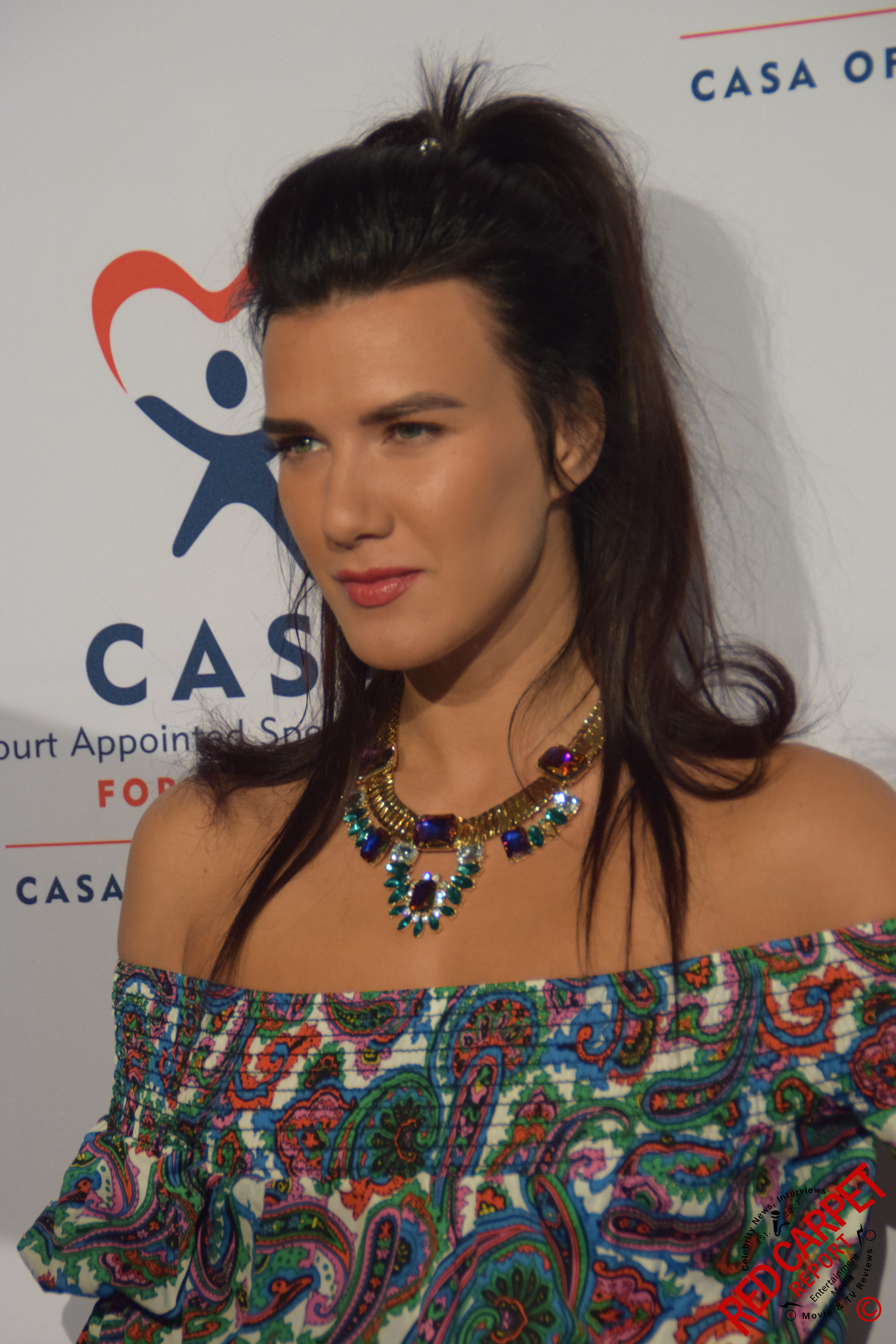
- Natalie Burn in May 2015
- Born: Natalia Guslistaya; Kyiv, Ukraine
- Occupations: Actress, model, screenwriter, film producer
- Years active: 2006–present

Natalie Burn (Note: Ukrainian: Наталі Берн, romanized: Natali Bern) (born Natalia Guslistaya (Note: Ukrainian: Наталія Гуслиста, romanized: Nataliia Huslysta)) is a Ukrainian-born American actress, film producer, ballerina, choreographer, screenwriter, and model. She is known for her acting roles in The Expendables 3, Mechanic: Resurrection, Downhill, Mamula, In the Name of the King 2: Two Worlds, Mothers and Daughters, Acceleration, Fortress: Sniper's Eye, Fortress, The Enforcer, Til Death Do Us Part, Chupacabras and Foster.

In addition to acting, she has also worked as a producer on several films, including Acceleration, The Enforcer, Til Death Do Us Part and Foster.

== Early life and career ==
Burn was born Natalia Guslistaya in Kyiv, Ukraine. As a child, she attended the Bolshoi Ballet School in Moscow, and later the Royal Ballet School in London. Eventually she was admitted to the Rambert Dance Company at Brunel University, studying the art of choreography and modern forms of dance. Before her career as an actress, model, screenwriter, and producer, she had an impressive dance career performing on top stages all over the world and as a choreographer for numerous theatrical productions. She owns two production companies, 7Heaven Productions and Born to Burn Films.

In 2014, Burn had a tiny role in the action adventure film The Expendables 3. She also was a producer of Devil's Hope and in 2015, she wrote, starred, and produced the action film Awaken.

In 2016, Burn appeared in the film Criminal, and played a supporting role in Mechanic: Resurrection, alongside Jason Statham.

== Filmography ==
Key
†	Denotes films that have not yet been released

=== Film ===
Year	Title	Role	Notes
2006	Coffee Date	Christa	Uncredited
2006	Richard III	Natasha	
2009	Taxi Dance	Anna	
2011	In the Name of the King 2: Two Worlds	Elianna	
2014	Mamula	Lucy	
2014	The Expendables 3	Conrad's Wife	
2015	A Perfect Vacation (a.k.a. Awaken)	Billie Kope	Also writer and producer
2016	Criminal	Shoo shoo	Uncredited
2016	Mothers and Daughters	Young Lydia	
2016	Downhill	Stephanie	
2016	Mechanic: Resurrection	BBC Reporter	
2017	The Executioners	Kay	
2018	The Second Coming of Christ	Sonya Antonov	Also producer
2019	Hollow Point	Det. Emily Plaza	
2019	Acceleration	Rhona	Also producer
2019	Hard Night Falling	Emma	
2021	The Pizza Tip		Producer
2021	Fortress	Sandra	Producer
2022	Love Hurt	Detective Denver	Producer
2022	No Name and Dynamite Davenport	Pearl	
2022	Fortress: Sniper's Eye	Sandra	
2022	The Enforcer	Olivia	Producer
2022	Una Preguiera Per Giuda	Dana	
2023	Til Death Do Us Part	Bride	
2024	The Last Redemption	Diana	
TBA	Eye in the Trees	Marcy	
TBA	The Movers †	TBA	
TBA	Chupacabra †	TBA	Lead Actress, Producer

=== Television ===
Year	Title	Role	Note
2017	No Actor Parking	Mia	Unsold Pilot
2020	Studio City	Shelby Brooks	1.10
2022	Vanished: Searching For my Sister	Joyce	TV movie

== Nominations ==
Best Supporting Drama Actress nomination at the Indie Series Awards in 2023 for her role in Studio City.
