= Point Break =

1991 film by Kathryn Bigelow

- Theatrical release poster
- Directed by: Kathryn Bigelow
- Screenplay by: W. Peter Iliff (Note: In December 2025, James Cameron claimed that he "wrote Point Break" and was unjustly denied a credit by the WGA, stating, "I flat out got stiffed by the Writers Guild on that. It was bullshit." Credited screenwriter Iliff responded by acknowledging that Cameron added scenes to the script in his capacity as executive producer—noting that this is "commonplace on studio pictures"—but that he did not add enough material to earn a screenwriting credit under WGA rules. Iliff said that he "always make[s] sure to give Jim credit when publicly asked to speak about the film", but pointed out that the WGA had access to every draft of the screenplay when making their decision.)
- Story by: Rick King; W. Peter Iliff
- Produced by: Peter Abrams; Robert L. Levy
- Starring: Keanu Reeves; Patrick Swayze; Gary Busey; Lori Petty
- Cinematography: Donald Peterman
- Edited by: Howard Smith
- Music by: Mark Isham
- Production companies: Largo Entertainment; Johnny Utah Productions
- Distributed by: 20th Century Fox
- Release dates: July 10, 1991 (Westwood); July 12, 1991 (United States)
- Running time: 122 minutes
- Country: United States
- Language: English
- Budget: $24 million
- Box office: $83.5 million

Point Break is a 1991 American action film directed by Kathryn Bigelow and written by W. Peter Iliff. It stars Patrick Swayze, Keanu Reeves, Gary Busey and Lori Petty. The title refers to the surfing term "point break", where a wave breaks as it hits a point of land jutting out from the coastline. The film features Reeves as an undercover FBI agent who is tasked with investigating the identities of a group of bank robbers while he develops a complex relationship with the group's leader (Swayze).

Development of Point Break began in 1986, when Iliff wrote an initial script for the film. Bigelow soon developed it with her husband, James Cameron, and filming took place four years later. It was shot across the western coast of the continental United States and was budgeted at $24 million. It was released on July 12, 1991.

Point Break premiered in Westwood on July 10, 1991 before being released by 20th Century Fox on July 12, 1991. The film opened to generally positive reviews, with critics praising the chemistry between Reeves and Swayze. During its theatrical run, it grossed over $83.5 million, and has since gained a cult following. A remake was released in 2015.

== Plot ==
Former Ohio State quarterback and rookie FBI agent Johnny Utah assists senior agent Angelo Pappas in investigating a string of Los Angeles bank robberies by the "Ex-Presidents": robbers who wear rubber masks of former presidents Ronald Reagan, Jimmy Carter, Richard Nixon, and Lyndon B. Johnson. Rather than robbing the vault, they demand only the cash the tellers have in their drawers and are gone within ninety seconds.

Pursuing Pappas's theory that the criminals are surfers, Utah infiltrates the surfing community. He fabricates a family tragedy to persuade orphaned surfer and restaurant waitress Tyler to teach him to surf after she saves him from drowning during his first attempt. Through her, he meets Bodhi, Tyler's ex-boyfriend and the leader of a gang of surfers consisting of Roach, Grommet, and Nathaniel. The group is wary of Utah, but they accept him when Bodhi recalls how a knee injury derailed Utah's football prospects. As he masters surfing, Utah finds himself drawn to the surfers' adrenaline-charged lifestyle, Bodhi's philosophies, and Tyler. Following a clue retrieved by analyzing toxins found in the hair of one of the bank robbers, Utah and Pappas lead an FBI raid on another gang of surfers, resulting in the deaths of two of them. The raid inadvertently ruins a DEA undercover operation, as those surfers were wanted for separate charges regarding drug dealing, and they are determined not to be the Ex-Presidents.

Watching Bodhi's group surfing, Utah begins to suspect that they are the Ex-Presidents, noting how close a group they are and the way one of them moons other surfers in the same manner one of the robbers does. Utah and Pappas stake out a bank, and the Ex-Presidents appear. While wearing a Reagan mask, Bodhi leads Utah on a foot chase through the neighborhood, which ends when Utah's old injury flares up after he jumps into a flood control channel. Despite having a clear shot, the injured Utah allows Bodhi to escape.

At a campfire that night, it is confirmed that Bodhi and his gang are the Ex-Presidents. Tyler discovers Utah's FBI badge and angrily terminates their relationship. Shortly afterward, Bodhi coerces Utah into skydiving with the group. After the jump, Bodhi reveals that he knows Utah is an FBI agent and has arranged for his friend Rosie, a non-surfing thug, to hold Tyler hostage to blackmail him into assisting the Ex-Presidents with their last bank robbery of the summer. During the robbery, they decide to infiltrate the vault, causing them to take longer than normal. Grommet is killed when an off-duty police officer and one of the bank security guards attempt to foil the robbery. The robbers kill the officer and security guard, then abandon Utah. Utah is arrested for the robbery and castigated by FBI director Ben Harp for the murders, but Pappas punches Harp out after an angry altercation and vows to bring in Bodhi himself.

Pappas and Utah head to the airport where Bodhi, Roach, and Nathaniel are about to leave for Mexico. During a shootout, Pappas and Nathaniel are killed, and Roach is seriously wounded. With Roach aboard, Bodhi forces Utah onto the plane at gunpoint. Once airborne and over their intended drop zone, Bodhi and Roach put on their parachutes and jump from the plane, leaving Utah to take the blame. With no other parachutes available, Utah jumps from the plane with Bodhi's gun and intercepts him in mid-air. Despite landing safely, Utah's knee gives out again, allowing Bodhi to escape. Bodhi meets with Rosie, who frees Tyler; with Roach dead from his wounds, the two men flee the country and go their separate ways.

Nine months later, Utah tracks Bodhi to Bells Beach in Victoria, Australia, where a record-breaking storm is producing lethal waves. This is an event Bodhi had talked about experiencing, calling it the "50-year storm." Bodhi begs Utah to release him so he can ride the once-in-a-lifetime wave, and Utah, knowing Bodhi will not come back alive, agrees and bids him farewell. As Bodhi surfs to his death, Utah walks away, throwing his FBI badge into the ocean.

== Cast ==
- Keanu Reeves as FBI Agent Johnny Utah
- Patrick Swayze as Bodhi Bodhisattva
- Gary Busey as FBI Agent Angelo Pappas
- Lori Petty as Tyler Ann Endicott
- John C. McGinley as FBI Director Ben Harp
- James LeGros as Roach
- John Philbin as Nathaniel
- Bojesse Christopher as Grommet
- Lee Tergesen as Rosie
- Vincent Klyn as Lupton "Warchild" Pittman
- Chris Pedersen as "Bunker" Weiss
- Dave Olson as Archbold
- Anthony Kiedis as Tone
- Galyn Gorg as Margarita
- Sydney Walsh as Miss Deer
- Anthony Mangano as Off Duty Cop at Bank
- Mike Genovese as FBI Instructor Corey
- Jack Kehler as FBI Technician Halsey
- Christopher Pettiet as 15-Year-Old Kid at Surfboard Shop
- Peter Phelps as Aussie Surfer
- Tom Sizemore as DEA Agent Deets (uncredited)

== Production ==
According to screenwriter W. Peter Iliff, he was asked to write the script for director Rick King from an idea the latter had about "surfers who rob banks". Later the pair sold the screenplay under the title Johnny Utah.

The film came close to production in 1986, with Matthew Broderick, Johnny Depp, Val Kilmer, and Charlie Sheen all being considered to play the Johnny Utah character, with Ridley Scott directing. However production fell through.

Four years later, after acquiring the screenplay, the producers of Point Break began looking for a director. At the time, executive producer James Cameron was married to director Kathryn Bigelow, who had just completed Blue Steel and was looking for her next project. The couple worked on the script together, which subsequently became the source of some dispute. When the matter of assigning credit for the script went to arbitration, the Writers Guild of America (WGA) assigned sole credit to Iliff. In December 2025, Cameron claimed he "wrote Point Break" and that he "flat out got stiffed by the Writers Guild". Iliff responded by acknowledging that Cameron had added scenes to the script in his capacity as executive producer—noting that this is "commonplace on studio pictures"—but that he did not add enough material to earn a screenwriting credit under WGA rules. Iliff said that he "always make[s] sure to give Jim credit when publicly asked to speak about the film", but pointed out that the WGA had access to every draft of the screenplay when making their decision.

Point Break was originally called Johnny Utah when Keanu Reeves was cast in the title role. The studio felt that this title said very little about surfing and by the time Patrick Swayze was cast, the film had been renamed Riders on the Storm after the famous song by The Doors. However, Jim Morrison's lyrics had nothing to do with the film and so that title was also rejected. It was not until halfway through filming that Point Break became the film's title because of its relevance to surfing.

Reeves liked the name of his character, as it reminded him of star athletes like Johnny Unitas and Joe Montana. He described his character as "a total control freak and the ocean beats him up and challenges him. After a while everything becomes a game. He becomes as amoral as any criminal. He loses the difference between right and wrong". Swayze felt that Bodhi was a lot like him and that they both shared "that wild-man edge".

Two months before filming, Lori Petty, Reeves and Swayze trained with former world-class professional surfer Dennis Jarvis on the Hawaiian island of Kauai. Jarvis remembers, "Patrick said he'd been on a board a couple of times, Keanu definitely had not surfed before, and Lori had never been in the ocean in her life." Shooting the surfing sequences proved to be challenging for all three actors, with Swayze cracking four of his ribs. For many of the surfing scenes, he refused to use a stunt double as he never had one for fight scenes or car chases. He also did the skydiving scenes himself and the film's aerial jump instructor Jim Wallace found that he was a natural and took to it right away. Swayze ended up making 55 jumps for the film. Swayze admitted that he almost died six or ten times while shooting the film. Swayze actually based aspects of his character after one of his stunt doubles, Darrick Doerner, a top big wave surfer. After learning to surf for the film, Reeves took a liking to it and took it up as a hobby.

A few of the action scenes were shot from the POV of the characters and Bigelow along with the cinematographer devised an innovative light weight pogo cam to create a sense of immersion among the audience.

Parts of the film were shot at Lake Powell in Utah, Wheeler and Ecola State Park in Cannon Beach, Oregon, and Malibu, Manhattan Beach, Santa Monica, Venice, and Fox Hills Mall in California. Although the final scene of the film is set at Bells Beach in Victoria, Australia, the scene was filmed at Indian Beach in Ecola State Park, in Oregon.

== Soundtrack ==
- Ratt – "Nobody Rides for Free"
- Concrete Blonde – "I Want You"
- Jimmy Buffett – "Volcano"
- The Jimi Hendrix Experience – "If 6 Was 9"
- School of Fish – "Rose Colored Glasses"
- Public Image Ltd. – "Criminal"
- Shark Island – "My City"
- Love – "7 and 7 Is"
- Loudhouse – "Smoke on the Water"
- Westworld – "So Long Cowboy"
- Little Caesar – "Down to the Wire"
- L.A. Guns – "Over the Edge"
- Liquid Jesus– "7 and 7 Is"
- Wire Train – "I Will Not Fall"
- Ice-T – "O.G. Original Gangster"
- Mark Isham – "Foot Chase"
- Sheryl Crow – "Hundreds of Tears"

=== Score album ===
On February 7, 2008, a score release for Point Break was released by La-La Land Records, featuring composer Mark Isham's score. This edition was limited to 2,000 units and features 65 minutes of score with liner notes by Dan Goldwasser that incorporate comments from both Bigelow and Isham. It is now out of print.

== Reception ==
=== Box office ===
Point Break was released on July 12, 1991, in 1,615 theaters, grossing $8.5 million on its opening weekend, behind Terminator 2: Judgment Day's (directed by Bigelow's then-husband, James Cameron) second weekend and the openings of the re-issue of One Hundred and One Dalmatians and Boyz n the Hood. With a budget of $24 million, the film went on to make $43.2 million in North America and $40.3 million internationally for a total of $83.5 million worldwide.

=== Critical response ===
On Rotten Tomatoes, the film holds an approval rating of 69% based on 81 reviews. The website's critics consensus reads: "Absurd, over-the-top, and often wildly entertaining, Point Break is here to show you that the human spirit is still alive." On Metacritic, which uses a weighted average, the film has a score of 60 out of 100 based on 21 critics, indicating "mixed or average reviews". Audiences polled by CinemaScore gave the film an average grade of "B+" on an A+ to F scale.

Roger Ebert of the Chicago Sun-Times gave the film three-and-a-half stars out of four and wrote: "Bigelow is an interesting director for this material. She is interested in the ways her characters live dangerously for philosophical reasons. They aren't men of action, but men of thought who choose action as a way of expressing their beliefs." On their TV show, Ebert's colleague Gene Siskel called the film "not bad at all" but considered it "overstuffed" with false endings and gratuitous dialogue, and ultimately gave the film a "thumbs down."

In her review for The New York Times, Janet Maslin praised Reeves's performance: "A lot of the snap comes, surprisingly, from Mr. Reeves, who displays considerable discipline and range. He moves easily between the buttoned-down demeanor that suits a police procedural story and the loose-jointed manner of his comic roles." Entertainment Weekly gave the film a "C+" rating and Owen Gleiberman wrote: "Point Break makes those of us who don't spend our lives searching for the ultimate physical rush feel like second-class citizens. The film turns reckless athletic valor into a new form of aristocracy."

In his review for The Washington Post, Hal Hinson wrote: "A lot of what Bigelow puts up on the screen bypasses the brain altogether, plugging directly into our viscera, our gut. The surfing scenes in particular are majestically powerful, even awe-inspiring. Bigelow's picture is a feast for the eyes, but we watch movies with more than our eyes. She seduces us, then asks us to be bimbos." Rolling Stone magazine's Peter Travers wrote: "Bigelow can't keep the film from drowning in a sea of surf-speak. But without her, Point Break would be no more than an excuse to ogle pretty boys in wet suits."

USA Today gave the film two out of four stars, and Mike Clark wrote: "Its purely visceral material (surf sounds, skydiving stunt work, a tough indoor shootout midway through) are first-rate. As for the tangibles that matter even more (script, acting, directorial control, credible relationships between characters), Break defies belief. Dramatically, it rivals the lowest surf yet this year." Time magazine's Richard Corliss wrote: "So how do you rate a stunningly made film whose plot buys so blithely into macho mysticism that it threatens to turn into an endless bummer? Looks 10, Brains 3."

Critics have commented on the central 'buddy' relationship of Bodhi and Johnny, and on the unusually equal dynamic in the romantic relationship of Tyler and Johnny (which Bigelow changed Peter Iliff's original script to create); Tyler is a "muscled, brash waitress with an androgynous name (Tyler) and physical features", and Johnny's "feminine edges nudge in nicely to her masculine ones. In nearly every scene they share, they are portrayed by the camera as equals."

In 2006, a special edition was released on DVD—the original DVD was released on May 22, 2001. Entertainment Weekly gave it a "B" rating and wrote: "The making-of docs (at their best discussing Swayze's extracurricular skydiving—that really is him doing the Adios, amigo fall) will leave you hanging."

In 2021, Keith Duggan, reflecting on Point Break 30 years later, wrote in the Irish Times:

For more than any other film of that time, Point Break seemed to announce what lay ahead in the grungy, baggy, anything goes 1990s, with greed and anti-capitalist forces clashing, America emitting its last lion's roar of unfettered optimism and the quest for one's precious spirit moving from the remnants of the hippy era into a multi-billion health and spirituality industry...Yup, standing on a stormy beach in 1991, old Bodhi had a pretty clear view of the next three decades.

== Legacy ==
The Daily Telegraph wrote that the film "certainly qualified as a cult favourite." Rolling Stone called Point Break "the greatest female-gaze action movie ever," citing the bodily condition of Reeves and Swayze, calling it a "wet Western." Entertainment Weekly ranked Point Break as having one of the "10 Best Surfing Scenes" in cinema.

Although officially inspired by a 1998 Vibe magazine article, the story and style of the 2001 film The Fast and the Furious have earned comparisons to those of Point Break, as Paul Walker plays a cop tasked with infiltrating the world of underground street racers, instead of surfers. Swayze's portrayal of Bodhi has been cited by Ubisoft developers as a chief inspiration for the character of Edward Kenway, the pirate antihero of the 2013 video game Assassin's Creed IV: Black Flag.

=== In popular culture ===
Point Break was referenced in 2007's Hot Fuzz, where the scene of Utah emptying his magazine into the sky in frustration is watched by the lead characters and later re-enacted by Nick Frost's character. In The Avengers, Tony Stark dismissively calls Thor "Point Break," presumably a comparison of Thor's hair to Swayze's in that film. In Thor: Ragnarok, after several attempts Thor correctly guesses that "Point Break" is the activation code that Stark had set up for him in the Quinjet. Between 2016 and 2020, indie musician JAWNY went by the stage name "Johnny Utah" in reference to the Point Break character.

== Post-release ==
=== Home media ===
Point Break was released on VHS on January 16, 1992, by Fox Video. It proved successful in the video rental market, becoming the 15th most-rented film in the United States for 1992. The film was released on DVD on October 3, 2006 and then Blu-ray on July 1, 2008. Point Break received a 4K restoration under Shout Factory's Shout Select label with an Ultra HD Blu-Ray release on December 5, 2023; marking the first remaster the film had received since the initial Blu-ray 15 years prior.

=== Special screenings (2026) ===
On August 16 and August 19, 2026, the film will be re-released at select U.S. theaters by Resurgence Media Group, Saga Arts and Fathom Entertainment, on the occasion of its 35th anniversary. The new 4K restoration will be preceded by an intro hosted by Matt Archbold, a surfing consultant and stunt double on the shoot.

== Related works ==
=== Point Break Live! ===
Point Blank Live! is a live-action parody of the film by playwright/director Jaime Keeling, featuring an audience member chosen to perform the role of Johnny Utah each night. First premiered in 2003, it has since been performed in more than a dozen cities and continues to be performed to this day.

=== Remake ===
Alcon Entertainment and Warner Bros. released a remake of the film in 2015 titled Point Break, which received mostly negative reviews. James LeGros and BoJesse Christopher, two of the actors who played Ex-Presidents in the 1991 film, were cast as FBI directors.

=== Television series ===
A television adaptation of the film was announced to be in development at AMC in December 2025, with Alcon Television Group and AMC Studios set to produce, and is scheduled to premiere sometime in 2027. The series was officially greenlit by AMC and Canal+ in September 2026, with Dave Kalstein and Christopher C. Rogers serving as showrunners and StudioCanal as co-producer.

== See also ==
- Heist film
- List of cult films
