= Kenneth Jezek =

American actor and dancer

- Occupation(s): Actor, dancer
- Years active: 1985 - present
- Spouse: Karen Kelly (m. 1989)
- Children: 2

Kenneth Jezek is an American actor and dancer.

== Career ==
Kenneth Jezek is best known for playing Lars Englund on the TV soap opera Days of Our Lives, in 1986 and 1987.

Prior to transitioning into acting, he was a professional dancer, often touring and teaching master jazz and tap classes in the United States, Europe, and Canada. Jezek's dancing credits include the Los Angeles companies of the award-winning Broadway musicals Cats and 42nd Street. He was also a regular series dancer in Fame, and a featured dancer in the movies Pretty In Pink and Fast Forward.

Jezek has numerous national and local commercial, music video and industrial credits as well.

Often credited as "Kenny" (due to the fact his middle initial is "E"), Jezek's movie career resurrected in 2009 with the Advent Film Group production Come What May with his wife Karen.

== Personal life ==
Kenneth Jezek is married to actress Karen Kelly who played Brenda Clegg on Capitol.

After leaving Hollywood, the couple (who met at a Hollywood party in 1986), were married in 1989 and became heavily involved in the theatrical arts ministry of a large local church where they acted, directed, and choreographed skits and musical productions. They have also starred in three independent Christian films, including Karla Faye Tucker: Forevermore in which Karen played the title role. In addition to Come What May, the Jezeks can be seen together in A Father's Heart.

They moved to Arizona in 1988 and have two daughters, Savanna and Shiloh. In 1999, the pair appeared on The 700 Club to talk about their new life as born again Christians.

Jezek holds black belts and full instructor certifications in several martial arts disciplines, founded Christian Freestyle Karate, and owned and operated a successful martial arts school.

They reside in Chandler, Arizona.

== Filmography ==
Film
Year	Film	Role	Other notes
1985	Fast Forward	Caesar's Gang Member	
2004	Karla Faye Tucker: Forevermore	Dana Brown	
2009	Come What May	Don Hogan	
Television
Year	Title	Role	Notes
1985	Fame	Cats dancer	Episode: A Place to Belong
1986-87	Days of Our Lives	Lars Englund	Episodes: Unknown
1987	St. Elsewhere	Jack Devlin	Episode: You Again?
