= Craig Robert Young =

British actor

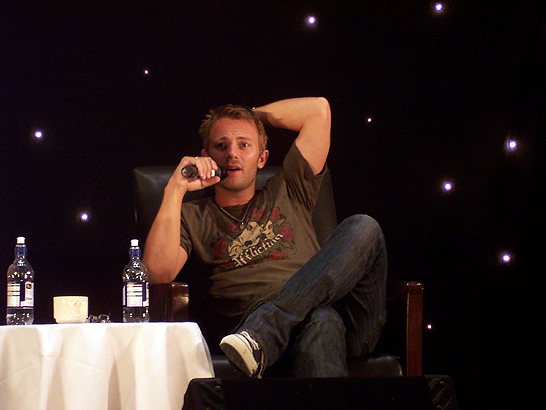
- Young in 2006
- Born: Craig Robert Yates; Nottingham, England, UK
- Occupation: Actor
- Years active: 1983–present
- Spouse: Michael Di Girolamo (m. 2023)

Craig Robert Young is a British actor who began his acting career at age ten, starring in the stage production of The Price of Coal. At 17, he moved to London to attend the Central School of Speech and Drama, whereupon he was chosen to become a member of the pop band Deuce, scoring four top 30 single hits: "Call It Love", "I Need You", "On the Bible", and "No Surrender".

Young soon began a successful stint as Alex Wilkinson in the British television series Dream Team. In 2001, he moved to Los Angeles, where he became a regular on the MTV series Spyder Games. Other television roles followed, including appearances on Hollywood 7, Charmed, Sabrina the Teenage Witch and The District. Young was also cast in the films Totally Sexy Loser (2003) and Wannabe (2005), the latter of which he co-wrote with director Richard Keith.

In addition to appearing in the Zoey 101 pilot, Young portrayed Coach Moore in Nickelodeon's soccer series Just for Kicks.

He originated the role of Will Fairchild in the play Boise, USA in 2008.

He appeared in The CW's 2009 series Melrose Place, playing Ella Simms's German love-rat famed director Franz Keppler. He recurred on the TV series 10 Things I Hate About You, playing yet another German, Frank Kline. J. J. Abrams has cast him in three of his TV series, Lost, What About Brian, and Fringe.

In July 2010, Young acted in the World War II action thriller Return to the Hiding Place (2011). In 2011, he had a recurring role on NCIS: Los Angeles as Dracul Comescu, an enemy to NCIS Special Agent G. Callen (Chris O'Donnell) with the role even expanding over to the Hawaii Five-0 episode "Pa Make Loa" which was a crossover between both NCIS: Los Angeles and Hawaii Five-0 with Young's role as Comescu ending when his character was shot dead by O'Donnell's character, Callen.

In the spring of 2014, Young played the role of Nicky Lancaster in Noël Coward's The Vortex. After a run in Malibu, he reprised his role with the same cast at The Matrix Theatre in Los Angeles in the winter. He also played roles in episodes of the TV series Hit the Floor and Hot in Cleveland.

Young portrayed Charlie Chaplin in David Fincher's 2020 Mank, starring alongside Gary Oldman and Amanda Seyfried.

== Personal life ==
Young is gay and married advertising executive Michael Di Girolamo in December 2023.
