= Wannabe (film) =

- Directed by: Richard Keith
- Written by: Richard Keith; Craig Robert Young
- Produced by: Richard Keith; Craig Robert Young; Paul Spadone
- Starring: Craig Robert Young; Adam Huss; Anna Becker; Elizabeth Warner
- Cinematography: Richard Keith
- Edited by: David Codron; Richard Keith
- Music by: John Norris
- Release date: 2005
- Running time: 83 min
- Country: United States
- Language: English

Wannabe is a 2005 comedy film starring Craig Robert Young, Adam Huss, Anna Becker, and Elizabeth Warner. It was written and produced by Young and Richard Keith and directed by Keith.

== Plot ==
Steve Williams (Craig Robert Young) was once part of boy band "Busboyz", but after surviving a horrific accident which killed the other members of the band, he now finds himself struggling for work, seeking credibility as an actor and the focus of a documentary. After being dropped by his manager for Paul—who was in a boy band rivalling "Busboyz"—Steve tries to make his own way through ever more demeaning auditions until he hears of a casting call for a Monkees-like TV show where he could showcase his acting, dancing and singing talents.

However, Steve then learns that Paul has been passing off as his own a dance contest victory which Paul won, and his nemesis is also trying out for the show. With a dance face-off between them on the cards, who will win out?

== Production ==
The film is directed by Richard Keith and was co-written by Keith and Young. It is based loosely on Young's own experiences as an actor in L.A. and former pop band member in UK Brit pop band, Deuce.

It stars Craig Young, Adam Huss, Anna Becker, and Liz Warner, with Brian Nahas, Carole Ita White, Eddie Mills, Tate Taylor, and Susan Duerden, and also features a cameo by Kyle XY's Matt Dallas.

== Reception ==
The film won the Audience Award Best Feature at Dances With Films 2006.
