= Til Death Do Us Part (2023 film) =

- Official release poster
- Directed by: Timothy Woodward Jr.
- Written by: Chad Law; Shane Dax Taylor
- Screenplay by: Lori Franklin-Garcia
- Produced by: Natalie Burn; Jeffrey Reddick
- Starring: Natalie Burn; Cam Gigandet; Orlando Jones; Jason Patric
- Cinematography: Pablo Diez
- Edited by: Fady Jeanbart
- Music by: Matthew Patrick; Donner
- Release date: August 4, 2023; (United States)
- Running time: 111 minutes
- Country: United States
- Language: English

Til Death Do Us Part is a 2023 American action-thriller wedding combat film directed by Timothy Woodward Jr., written by Chad Law and Shane Dax Taylor, and screenplay edited by Lori Franklin-Garcia. (Note: Attributed to multiple sources:) The film follows a bride who abandons her wedding and runs away, before she finds herself hunted down by six groomsmen.

== Plot ==
A bride ditches her wedding and then must fight off the scorned groom and his seven best men.

== Cast ==
- Cam Gigandet as Best Man
- Jason Patric as Husband
- Natalie Burn as Bride
- Orlando Jones as Groomsman 4
- Ser'Darius Blain as Groom
- Pancho Moler as Groomsman 7 / T-Bone
- Neb Chupin as Groomsman 2 / Big Sexy
- D.Y. Sao as Groomsman 1
- Sam Lee Herring as Groomsman 3
- Alan Silva as Groomsman 6
- Nicole Arlyn as Wife
- Anais Lilit as Bartender

== Reception ==
Review aggregator website Rotten Tomatoes reports a score of 33% based on 30 reviews.
