= W. Peter Iliff =

American screenwriter, film director and film producer

W. Peter Iliff (November 19, 1957) is an American screenwriter, film director, and film producer. He is known for writing the screenplay of the 1991 film Point Break. He also wrote the screenplay of the 2000 film Under Suspicion. Other films for which he wrote the screenplay include Patriot Games (1992), Varsity Blues (1999) and The Enforcer (2022).

He attended the University of California, Santa Barbara. Iliff is married to Ruthanne and they have two children, Dane and Bella.

== Select filmography ==
- Prayer of the Rollerboys (1990)-as screenwriter
- Point Break (1991)-as screenwriter
- Patriot Games (1992)-as screenwriter
- Varsity Blues (1999)-as screenwriter
- Under Suspicion (2000)-as screenwriter
- Cross (2011)-as executive producer
- Rites of Passage (2012)-as director and screenwriter
- Point Break (2015)-story credit
- The Enforcer (2022)-as screenwriter and executive producer
- Poker Face (2022)-as executive producer
- Turbulence (2025)-as executive producer
- Deep Water (2026)-as executive producer
