= Almost Love (2019 film) =

2019 American comedy written and directed by Mike Doyle

- Promotional release poster
- Directed by: Mike Doyle
- Written by: Mike Doyle
- Produced by: Kaolin Bass; Mandy Ward
- Starring: Scott Evans; Augustus Prew; Michelle Buteau; Colin Donnell
- Cinematography: Ludovic Littee
- Edited by: Michael Berenbaum
- Music by: Dabney Morris
- Production company: Sell By Film
- Distributed by: Netflix; Vertical Entertainment
- Release date: June 26, 2019 (U.S.)
- Running time: 94 minutes
- Country: United States
- Language: English

Almost Love is a 2019 American comedy drama romance film directed, and written by American actor Mike Doyle. It stars Scott Evans, Augustus Prew, Michelle Buteau and Colin Donnell. It was released in the United States on June 26, 2019, and on streaming platforms on August 2, 2020.

== Plot ==
Adam and Marklin are in a 5-year relationship when the passion for each other starts to dim, forcing them to face each other's shortcomings while also watching their close group of friends' love lives crumble around them. Their best friend Cammy's latest fling is everything she's looking for in a man, until she finds out that he's homeless and she's unsure if he's seeing her because of her or to have a place to crash. Haley is a teacher and is helping one of her students with the SAT's when he confesses his feeling for her. Then their friends Elizabeth and Damon have been married happily for 15 years when it's not so happy anymore.

== Cast ==
- Scott Evans as Adam
- Augustus Prew as Marklin
- Michelle Buteau as Cammy
- Colin Donnell as Henry
- Zoë Chao as Haley
- Kate Walsh as Elizabeth
- Chaz Lamar Shepherd as Damon
- Christopher Gray as Scott James
- Chris Henry Coffey as Karl
- Nadia Dajani as Nurse Hame
- Brian Marc as Guillermo
- Marilyn Sokol as Peggy
- Patricia Clarkson as Ravella Brewer
- John Doman as Tommy
- Bryce Pinkham as Taylor

== Production ==
The film was set for a theatrical release, but changed to streaming in the midst of the COVID-19 pandemic in the United States.

== Reception ==
Receiving mixed reviews from critics, the film holds a 68% critic score.
