= Haywire (2011 film) =

2011 film by Steven Soderbergh

- Theatrical release poster
- Directed by: Steven Soderbergh
- Written by: Lem Dobbs
- Produced by: Gregory Jacobs
- Starring: Gina Carano; Michael Fassbender; Ewan McGregor; Bill Paxton; Channing Tatum; Mathieu Kassovitz; Michael Angarano; Antonio Banderas; Michael Douglas
- Cinematography: Peter Andrews
- Edited by: Mary Ann Bernard
- Music by: David Holmes
- Production companies: Relativity Media; Bord Scannán na hÉireann/Irish Film Board
- Distributed by: Relativity Media (United States); Paramount Pictures; Momentum Pictures (United Kingdom and Ireland)
- Release dates: November 6, 2011 (AFI Fest); January 20, 2012 (United States)
- Running time: 93 minutes
- Countries: United States; Ireland
- Language: English
- Budget: $23 million
- Box office: $34.5 million

Haywire is a 2011 action thriller film directed by Steven Soderbergh and written by Lem Dobbs. The film stars Gina Carano as a black ops agent who is betrayed by her employers and targeted for assassination in a conspiracy she is forced to unravel. Carano, a mixed martial arts fighter, performs her own stunts in the film. Haywire also stars Michael Fassbender, Ewan McGregor, Bill Paxton, Channing Tatum, Antonio Banderas, and Michael Douglas. Its score is by DJ and composer David Holmes.

Haywire premiered on November 6, 2011, at the AFI Fest and received a wide release on January 20, 2012, by Relativity Media. It had a generally positive critical reception, with praise for its action, choreography, performances and Soderbergh's direction, but with some criticism levied at newcomer Carano's performance. The film grossed $34.5 million on a $23 million budget.

== Plot ==
At an Upstate New York diner, Mallory Kane meets her associate Aaron. He demands she get in a car outside. She refuses and he pulls a gun, but she disarms and pistol whips him. A customer, Scott, had intervened to help Mallory. She demands his car keys and that he get in his car to get away with her. As they flee, she explains who she is and what has happened to her.

Mallory and Aaron are operatives of a private intelligence firm that handles covert black operations so their clients can maintain plausible deniability. One week earlier, the firm's director (and Mallory's ex-boyfriend) Kenneth gave her an assignment offered by CIA agent Coblenz: to rescue Chinese national Jiang being held hostage in Barcelona. Mallory, Aaron, and her team successfully deliver Jiang to local contact Rodrigo.

Back in the United States, Kenneth gives Mallory an apparently simple assignment: pose as the wife of purportedly MI6 agent Paul during a mission in Dublin. Mallory accompanies Paul to a party at Russborough House, where they meet his contact, Studer. Mallory watches Paul go into a barn. Upon entering, she finds Jiang dead, clutching Mallory's brooch. Mallory realizes she is being set up.

In their hotel room, Paul attempts to kill his "wife", but to his shock ends up physically overpowered in a brutal brawl, put nearly to sleep with a triangle choke, and eventually shot dead by Mallory. After collecting herself, she searches through Paul's stuff and redials a missed call on his phone. Kenneth picks up, asking if "the divorce is final". Kenneth realizes he's been discovered, and sends his agents after her. She avoids them and the police, escaping on a ferry to England.

Mallory asks Rodrigo if it was he or Kenneth who set her up. Rodrigo calls Coblenz, who then calls Mallory saying he had suspicions about Kenneth, before claiming to arrange a meeting between the two. Coblenz then contacts Kenneth and tells him to inform Mallory's father, John, of her purported crimes.

In the present, Mallory and Scott are detained by police, but the police are ambushed and killed by Kenneth's men. Mallory kills one of them and flees with Scott in a police car. She releases Scott and leaves for her father's house in New Mexico, arriving before Kenneth, Aaron and two other men arrive to interrogate him about his daughter's whereabouts. Aaron receives a photograph on his phone of Jiang lying dead, and realizes that Mallory has been set up. He presses Kenneth for the truth, but Kenneth shoots him and escapes, as Mallory takes out Kenneth's other men. Aaron apologizes to Mallory before dying in her arms.

Mallory meets Coblenz, who reveals that he told Kenneth to go to Mallory's father's house, expecting that she would kill him there. Coblenz gives her Kenneth's present location, and offers her a job with the CIA, all charges wiped. She says she will let him know after she has found Kenneth.

Mallory tracks Kenneth down and fights him on a beach in Mexico where Kenneth's foot becomes jammed between rocks. Trapped, he reveals that Jiang was a journalist being protected after exposing Studer's ties to a human trafficking ring. Knowing Mallory planned to leave his firm, Kenneth had her kidnap Jiang and deliver him to Rodrigo, who delivered him to Studer, where Paul killed him and left his body in the barn. Kenneth framed Mallory, cutting all ties that could lead to him, telling Paul the cover story he would have in place after Paul had killed her in supposed self-defense. Disgusted, Mallory leaves Kenneth to the incoming tide.

Mallory locates Rodrigo on vacation in Majorca. She approaches to confront him.

== Cast ==
- Gina Carano as Mallory Kane
- Ewan McGregor as Kenneth
- Michael Douglas as Alex Coblenz
- Michael Fassbender as Paul
- Bill Paxton as John Kane
- Channing Tatum as Aaron
- Antonio Banderas as Rodrigo
- Michael Angarano as Scott
- Mathieu Kassovitz as Studer
- Eddie J. Fernandez as Barroso
- Anthony Brandon Wong as Jiang
- J. J. Perry as Max
- Tim Connolly as Jason
- Maximino Arciniega as Gomez
- Aaron Cohen as Jamie
- Natascha Berg as Liliana

== Production ==
=== Development ===
Film development was announced in September 2009 with the title Knockout, later changed to Haywire. The screenplay was written to be shot in Dublin. The film was shot mostly in Ireland, with principal photography spanning from February 2, 2010, to March 25, 2010, with a budget of $23 million.

=== Casting ===
In preparation for her role, Gina Carano underwent a six-week intensive tactical training course with former Duvdevan Unit officer Aaron Cohen, who has a cameo appearance in the finished film. She spent three hours a day in stunts and three hours a day with Cohen. During a particularly harrowing two-week period when Cohen was teaching Carano the art of surveillance and counter-surveillance, he and his team tracked her via a GPS system installed in her car.

=== Filming ===
Two locations included the former homes of Ireland's Leeson family who as the Earls of Milltown were once described as “Arch Rebels” of the ascendancy. These included the interior of palatial Russborough House, where Paul and Mallory attend a party, and exterior of the Kildare Street and University Club, which Mallory passes while being tailed at St. Stephen's Green.

The film was originally set to be released in late 2010, but re-shoots and a change in distributor from Lionsgate to Relativity Media delayed it for more than a year. During the intervening period, Soderbergh filmed and edited Contagion, which was ultimately released over a month in advance. Soderbergh reportedly clashed with Lionsgate, which wanted a more action-centric film in the vein of the Bourne series, while Soderbergh had intended a spy thriller interspersed with lengthy, realistic fight scenes. Following the change in distributor, Soderbergh's re-shoots and re-edits focused on reshaping the film to be more in line with his original vision.

=== Post-production ===
During post-production, some of Carano's voice was overdubbed by actress Laura San Giacomo.

== Music ==
David Holmes composed the score for the film and had worked with Steven Soderbergh on various other projects such as Out of Sight and the Ocean's trilogy.

== Release ==
=== Box office ===
Haywire was released on January 20, 2012, with an opening weekend gross of $8.4 million, and has earned $18.9 million in the United States and $34.5 million worldwide.

=== Critical response ===
The film received generally positive reviews from critics. Review aggregation website Rotten Tomatoes gives the film a score of 80% based on 199 reviews. The site's critical consensus reads, "MMA star and first-time actress Gina Carano displays ample action-movie chops in Haywire, a fast-paced thriller with a top-notch cast and outstanding direction from Steven Soderbergh." Metacritic gives it a weighted average score of 67/100 based on reviews from 40 critics. Audiences polled by CinemaScore gave the film an average grade of "D+" on an A+ to F scale.

Claudia Puig of USA Today stated that the film was "a vigorous spy thriller that consistently beckons the viewer to catch up with its narrative twists and turns. Bordering on convoluted, it works best when in combat mode." Andrew O'Hehir of Salon.com called it "a lean, clean production, shot and edited by Soderbergh himself and utterly free of the incoherent action sequences and overcooked special effects that plague similarly scaled Hollywood pictures."

Richard Corliss of Time said "Carano is her own best stuntwoman, but in the dialogue scenes she's all kick and no charisma. The MMA battler lacks the conviction she so forcefully displayed in the ring. She is not Haywire's heroine but its hostage." Keith Uhlich of Time Out New York wrote, "There's shockingly little thrill in watching Carano bounce off walls and pummel antagonists."

== Home media ==
Haywire was released on DVD and Blu-ray disc on May 1, 2012.
