= Acceleration (film) =

- Theatrical release poster
- Directed by: Michael Merino; Daniel Zirilli
- Written by: Michael Merino
- Produced by: Natalie Burn
- Starring: Sean Patrick Flanery; Dolph Lundgren; Chuck Liddell; Natalie Burn; Danny Trejo; Quinton "Rampage" Jackson
- Cinematography: Jan-Michael Losada
- Edited by: Mike Mendez
- Music by: Gregory De Iulio
- Production company: 7Heaven Productions
- Distributed by: CineTel Films
- Release date: November 8, 2019
- Running time: 85 minutes
- Country: United States
- Language: English

Acceleration is a 2019 American action film directed by Michael Merino and Daniel Zirilli. The film stars Sean Patrick Flanery, Dolph Lundgren, Chuck Liddell, Danny Trejo, Quinton "Rampage" Jackson and Natalie Burn, who also produced.

== Plot ==
Crime lord Vladik Zorich, whose influence permeates the seedy underbelly of Los Angeles, is double-crossed by his most trusted operative, Rhona Zyocki. Vladik retaliates by kidnapping Rhona's young son, forcing Rhona to eliminate Vladik's worst enemies and retrieve valuable goods and information, all in one fateful night. Vladik sets out the 'rules' to his 'game' and oversees Rhona's every move as she navigates the darkened city streets.

== Cast ==
- Sean Patrick Flanery as Kane
- Dolph Lundgren as Vladik Zorich
- Chuck Liddell as Hannibal
- Natalie Burn as Rhona Zyocki
- Quinton "Rampage" Jackson as Eli
- Danny Trejo as Santos
- Ian Fisher as Chiko
- Dobromir Mashukov as Mika
- Luka Tartaglia as Antoine

== Release ==
=== Theatrical ===
Acceleration was released theatrically in the United States on November 8, 2019.

== Reception ==
=== Critical response ===
The film has received mostly negative reviews from critics, with Frank Scheck of The Hollywood Reporter, Noel Murray of the Los Angeles Times, and Richard Whittaker of The Austin Chronicle criticizing the film's poor plot.
