= Abby Mann =

American screenwriter and producer (1927–2008)

- Born: Abraham Goodman; December 1, 1927; Philadelphia, Pennsylvania, U.S.
- Died: March 25, 2008 (aged 80); Beverly Hills, California, U.S.
- Occupations: Screenwriter, film producer
- Spouse: Myra Maislin
- Children: 3, including Aaron Cohen

Abby Mann (December 1, 1927 – March 25, 2008) was an American screenwriter and producer.

== Life and career ==
The son of Russian-Jewish immigrants, Mann was born as Abraham Goodman in Philadelphia. He grew up in East Pittsburgh, Pennsylvania.

He was best known for his work on controversial subjects and social drama. His best known work is the screenplay for Judgment at Nuremberg (1961), which was initially a television drama that aired in 1959. Stanley Kramer directed the film adaptation, for which Mann received the Academy Award for Best Adapted Screenplay. In his acceptance speech, he said:

A writer worth his salt at all has an obligation not only to entertain but to comment on the world in which he lives.

Mann later adapted the play for a 2001 production on Broadway, which featured Maximilian Schell from the 1961 film in a different role. In the introduction to the printed script, Mann credited a conversation with Abraham Pomerantz, U.S. Chief Deputy Counsel, for giving him the initial interest in Nuremberg. Mann and Kramer also collaborated on the films Ship of Fools and A Child Is Waiting.

While working for television, he created the series Kojak, starring Telly Savalas. Mann was executive producer, but was also credited as a writer on many episodes. His other writing credits include the screenplays for the television films The Marcus-Nelson Murders, The Atlanta Child Murders, Teamster Boss: The Jackie Presser Story, and Indictment: The McMartin Trial, as well as the film War and Love. He also directed the 1978 NBC TV miniseries King. In 1974, he signed a deal with Columbia Pictures Television to develop long-form television projects.

== Personal life ==
Mann was married to Myra Maislin. His wife had two children from a previous marriage, Adrienne Cohen Isom, and Aaron Cohen, a former Israeli Duvdevan Unit Special Forces operative.

Mann died of heart failure in Beverly Hills, California on March 25, 2008, aged 80. He died one day after Richard Widmark, one of the stars of Judgment at Nuremberg. Mann is interred in Culver City's Hillside Memorial Park Cemetery.

== Selected filmography ==
- Port of Escape (1956)
- Judgment at Nuremberg (1961)
- A Child Is Waiting (1963)
- Ship of Fools (1965)
- The Detective (1968)
- The Marcus-Nelson Murders (1973)
- King (1978, also director)
- The Atlanta Child Murders (1985)
- War and Love (1985)
- Teamster Boss: The Jackie Presser Story (1992)
- Indictment: The McMartin Trial (1995)

== See also ==
- List of Russian Academy Award winners and nominees
