= Amy Makes Three =

Upcoming film by Josh Sternfeld

- Directed by: Josh Sternfeld
- Written by: Josh Sternfeld
- Produced by: Michael Goodin; Scott Kluge
- Starring: Torrey DeVitto; Mike Doyle
- Cinematography: Jordan T. Parrott
- Edited by: Colby Bartine
- Production companies: Monolith Pictures; Tremendous Entertainment
- Country: United States
- Language: English

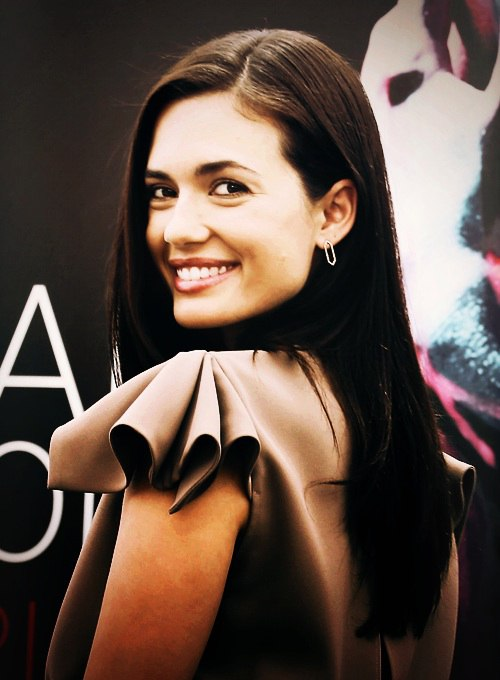
Actress Torrey DeVitto is portraying Carla Forrest in the film

Amy Makes Three is an unreleased American psychological thriller, written and directed by Josh Sternfeld.

Principal photography began on June 23, 2015 in Wappingers Falls, Dutchess County in upstate New York.

== Premise ==
An affluent young couple struggles to overcome grief by confronting the ghost of their first child, who died as a premature baby.

== Cast ==
- Torrey DeVitto as Carla Forrest
- Mike Doyle as Greg Forrest
- Ursula Parker as Amy Forrest
- Joseph Adams as Dr. Wilman

=== Filming ===
Initial photography began in Dutchess County in upstate New York on June 23, 2015.

== Release ==
As of September 2017 the Amy Makes Three home page still displays a "Coming 2016" notice, no further release date has been revealed.
