= Meskada =

- Directed by: Josh Sternfeld
- Written by: Josh Sternfeld
- Produced by: Jen Gatien; Michael Goodin; Jay Kubassek; Shawn Rice; Ron Stein
- Starring: Nick Stahl; Rachel Nichols
- Cinematography: Daniel Sariano
- Edited by: Phyllis Housen
- Music by: Lee Curreri; Steve Weinberg
- Production company: Aliquot Films
- Distributed by: Red Flag Releasing
- Release date: 2010
- Running time: 87 minutes
- Country: United States
- Language: English

Meskada is a 2010 American crime drama film written and directed by Josh Sternfeld and starring Nick Stahl and Rachel Nichols as police detectives assigned to investigate a home invasion in which a young boy is murdered in the commission of the crime. The film premiered at the 2010 Tribeca Film Festival.

== Plot ==
Two men, Shane Loakin and Eddie Arlinger, are desperate for money to support their families. While Shane stands guard, Eddie breaks into what the men believe to be an unoccupied home in the fictitious Midwestern town of Hilliard. Eddie panics when he finds a young boy home alone, and in the heat of the panic, strikes the boy as the boy goes towards the phone to call the police. The boy dies.

Noah Cordin, a detective in Hilliard, is assigned to the case with a partner, Leslie Spencer (Nichols). Noah believes the crime had to have been committed by two people. He promises the murdered boy's mother, Allison Connor, that he will find her son Toby's killers. Noah is married and has a son of his own, so he feels personally compelled to solve the crime.

During the investigation, Noah locates a piece of evidence that links the suspects to a nearby impoverished town, Caswell, which is also the home town to which he hasn't returned in several years. Hilliard and Caswell are both in Meskada County.

After Noah conducts a cattle-call–like interview of most of the men in Caswell, resulting in no viable leads, he returns to an annual town event as a cover for surreptitiously conducting further investigation.

One of the interviewees, Dennis Burrows, Shane's brother-in-law, knows nothing of Shane's involvement in the crime. Dennis lies to the police about his whereabouts at the time of the crime in order to cover up an extramarital affair that he's carrying on with the niece, Nat (Grace Gummer), of the owner of the local bar, Billy. The lie and his nervous behavior during the interview throw Dennis under Noah's suspicion. After the town celebration, Noah questions an intoxicated Shane trying to get him to inform on Dennis. Shane tries to assure Noah that he knows nothing about the crime, but Noah is not convinced.

Dennis is often out of work. He and Shane's sister Lyla have a son Keith who needs an expensive ear operation, which is one of the reasons why Shane resorts to breaking into houses.

Caswell is applying to the Meskada County Commission to permit a pharmaceutical company to take over a factory that was closed five years before. If the request is approved, the new company will create hundreds of jobs for the impoverished town. But the young victim of the break-in, Toby Connor, is the son of a member of the Meskada County Commission, Allison Connor. Caswell residents fear that the police attention in their town will adversely affect the vote of the commission, and it does. As a result, Noah is angrily treated as an enemy by the town for continuing to investigate the crime there. Noah is also receiving pressure in Hilliard. Allison, during a rowdy town hall meeting, publicly accuses him of trying to protect his hometown by stalling her son's murder investigation.

Meanwhile, Shane is becoming more and more fearful of being apprehended by the police. He confronts Eddie and tries to persuade him to leave town, but Eddie refuses, telling Shane that leaving now would call attention to them.

A break in the case finally comes when the police learn that Nat has been pawning some of the items stolen from the home where the murder occurred and that the items were given to her by Eddie. Noah and Leslie question Nat, and she unknowingly and inadvertently implicates Shane.

The police track down the man who helped Nat pawn the items, and after a foot chase, Leslie is beaten by two of the men they are chasing. Noah comes close to having to shoot one of the suspects who is carrying a gun in his waistband.

Shane and Eddie panic and try to leave town but are stopped and confronted by Dennis, Billy, and other men in the town who now know who committed the crime. Dennis, in a struggle with Shane, cuts Shane's throat with a broken beer bottle. The men tell Eddie to leave Caswell and never come back. Shane's dead body, ostensibly offered up as a sacrifice to the Maskada County Commission, is found the next morning on the steps of the county building. In Shane's clutched hand are petitions covered with signatures from Caswell residents lobbying for the pharmaceutical company's permit to be approved.

Although sheriffs believe that the person responsible for the crime is dead, Noah believes that his accomplice, the actual killer, is still at large. He and Leslie go to the town bar and trash it while demanding the identity of Shane's accomplice. The bar owner, Billy, and his patrons, even under duress, reveal nothing. Noah is furious at their willingness to protect a murderer, and he and Leslie leave the bar disgusted.

In the closing shot Noah stops to see Allison, who is packing a moving van. Even though Noah knows that the killer is still at large, in an act of compassion, he tells a questioning Allison that the dead man was the murderer, and that there was no other accomplice. Allison, who previously had turned on Noah and questioned his abilities, now thanks him and tells him to go home to his family.

== Cast ==
- Jonathan Tucker as Shane Loakin
- Kellan Lutz as Eddie Arlinger
- Nick Stahl as Noah Cordin
- Laura Benanti as Allison Connor
- Norman Reedus as Dennis Burrows
- James McCaffrey as Billy
- Rebecca Henderson as Lyla
- Charlie Tahan as Keith

== Reception ==
On review aggregator website Rotten Tomatoes, the film has 33% approval rating based on 6 reviews, with an average rating of 4.3/10.

Derek Adams of Time Out said that "[the film is s]mall in scope but smart in the way it deals with how cozy communities react when something rotten surfaces in their world".

In an interview with the Los Angeles Times, Mark Olsen wrote that "[the film is g]ood but perhaps not good enough", adding that "Meskada can be thought of as solid letter-grade-B work".

According to Robert Koehler of Variety "Meskada uneasily merges crime drama, police procedural and social commentary in a potentially serious depiction of schisms in contemporary rural America".
