= Josh Sternfeld =

American film director

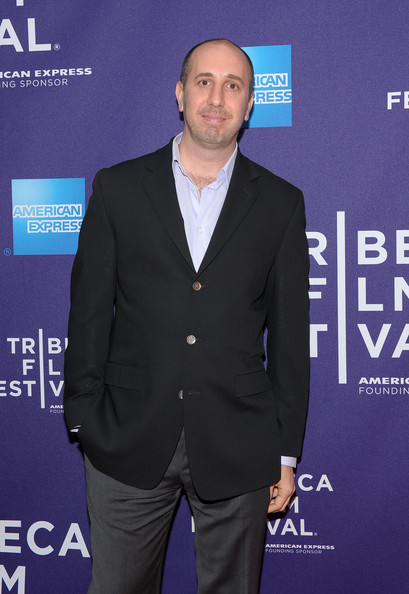
- Josh Sternfeld at the 2010 Tribeca Film Festival.
- Born: Joshua Sternfeld circa 1972; New York City, USA
- Education: Washington University in St. Louis
- Alma mater: Tisch School of the Arts
- Occupations: Director, writer, filmmaker
- Years active: 1997–present
- Notable work: Winter Solstice (film); Amy Makes Three

Josh Sternfeld (born Joshua Sternfeld in 1972, New York City, New York), is an American film writer/director.

In June 2021, Sternfeld directed the action film Fortress: Sniper's Eye (2022) .

== Biography ==
Born in New York City, Sternfeld studied English literature at Washington University in St. Louis. He graduated from New York University Tisch School of the Arts in 1999. As a director, Sternfeld won critical acclaim when his first short film, Balloons, Streamers (1997), premiered at the 1997 New York Film Festival and then screened at the 1998 Sundance Film Festival.

In 1999, Sternfeld began work as an assistant editor at Steeplechase Films, where he worked on Ric Burns' 2000 Emmy Award-nominated series, New York: A Documentary Film (2000).

In 2005 he wrote and directed his first feature film, Winter Solstice. The story follows the efforts of a man who struggles to relate to his sons in the years following the accidental death of his wife. The film was distributed by Paramount Classics.

In 2009 Sternfeld wrote and directed the police drama Meskada (2010).

He wrote and directed the unreleased thriller, Amy Makes Three which stars Torrey DeVitto and Mike Doyle (actor).

In June 2021, Sternfeld directed the film Fortress: Sniper's Eye (2022) .

== Selected filmography ==
- Balloons, Streamers (1997)
- Colin's Date (1998)
- Winter Solstice (2005)
- Meskada (2010)
- Fortress: Sniper's Eye (2022)
- Amy Makes Three (unreleased)

== Personal life ==
Sternfeld lives in New York.
