= Alone yet Not Alone =

2013 film by Ray Bengston and George D. Escobar

Alone yet Not Alone: Their Faith Became Their Freedom
- Theatrical release poster
- Directed by: Ray Bengston; George D. Escobar
- Screenplay by: James Richards; George D. Escobar
- Based on: Alone Yet Not Alone: The Story of Barbara and Regina Leininger by Tracy Michele Leininger Craven
- Produced by: Barbara Divisek; George D. Escobar; Cynthia Garcia Walker; Michael Snyder
- Starring: Kelly Greyson; Natalie Racoosin; Jenn Gotzon; Clay Walker
- Cinematography: James Suttles
- Edited by: M. Scott Smith
- Music by: William Ross; Bruce Broughton
- Production company: AYNA
- Distributed by: Enthuse Entertainment
- Release date: September 27, 2013
- Running time: 103 minutes
- Country: United States
- Language: English
- Budget: $7 million
- Box office: $887,851

Alone yet Not Alone: Their Faith Became Their Freedom (retitled Massacre at Buffalo Valley for some television showings) is a 2013 American Christian captivity narrative historical drama film directed by Ray Bengston, co-directed by George D. Escobar, and starring Kelly Greyson, Jenn Gotzon, and Clay Walker. Adapted from Tracy Leininger Craven's namesake novel, the film gets its title from the German hymn "Allein, und doch nicht ganz allein." It dramatizes the accounts of three preteen girls, Barbara and Regina Leininger and Marie LeRoy, who the Delaware took captive in the Penn's Creek massacre.

James R. Leininger, the father of the original novel's author and descendant of the portrayed Leiningers, partially funded Alone yet Not Alone. The film's title song, "Alone yet Not Alone," was nominated for Best Original Song at the 86th Academy Awards. However, the academy rescinded the nomination two weeks later due to alleged tampering from co-composer Bruce Broughton.

== Plot ==
In the mid-18th century, the Leininger family immigrated from Germany to Penns Creek, Pennsylvania, where they farmed alongside the LeRoy and Hecklinger families. Nearby, General Braddock dismisses six Indian chiefs as prospective allies against George Washington's advice, leading them to support the French instead.

One day in 1755, the Indian brothers Galasko and Hannawoa, sons of a Delaware chief, assault and burn down the Leininger farm when Mrs. Leininger and John are out milling, killing Mr. Leininger and Christian. They capture Barbara and Regina after the girls attempt to hide in a cave and place them with several captured children, including their friend Marie LeRoy. Several days later, Galasko dubs Barbara "Susquehanna" before the Indians depart, dividing up the captives and separating Regina from Barbara and Marie. Barbara steals a horse and attempts to escape, but gets recaptured after a branch knocks her unconscious. When the Indians move to burn her alive for attempting escape, Galasko convinces them to spare Barbara after she promises never to flee again. They travel to the French Fort du Quesne and later to the Kittanning village.

After Benjamin Franklin and the captives' families, including Mrs. Leininger, protest the massacre, Governor Morris and the Pennsylvania legislature fund a militia that they send to assault Kittanning. The Indians promptly take Barbara, Marie, and other captives into the forest and decide to execute by fire Lydia Barrett, a captive who had attempted to escape during the battle, during which she hid two boys and let the militia rescue them. Not wanting Barrett to suffer further, a French soldier shoots her reluctantly after a scuffle with the Indians. The Indians arrive with their captives a month later at the Moschkingo village and assimilate them into their tribe. Barbara befriends Hylea, an Indian girl, while Marie gets sent to an elderly, abusive woman.

Several years later, Barbara, now a teenager, learns Marie intends to escape with two other captives, Owen Gibson and David Breckenridge, but initially dismisses their plan as unworkable. However, when Galasko proposes marriage and gives her Mrs. Leininger's brooch, which he took during the raid, Barbara contemplates her past and agrees to Marie's plans. They abscond at night when the Indians are away before her wedding. Hannwoa discovers their absence and begins pursuing them; meanwhile, Owen shoots and attempts to charge a bear, which slashes and wounds his leg before David scares it away. After the fugitives cross a river with difficulty, Hannwoa finds Galasko returning and informs him of Barbara's escape. Galasko attempts to join his pursuit, but Hannowa, convinced that he wants to protect Barbara from punishment again and steal his credit, murders him in a rage.

When the fugitives arrive at Fort Pitt, which Colonel Mercer garrisons, the British soldiers are unconvinced of their plight until Barbara convinces them by speaking German. When they attempt to receive them, Hannwoa appears and attacks them, inflicting several casualties before Barbara kills him with a wounded soldier's pistol. After a month at Fort Pitt, the four travel to Philadelphia and reunite with Mrs. Leininger, John, and Fritz Hecklinger. Barbara returns her mother's brooch to her, who informs her that Regina remains missing. Owen and David enlist in the Pennsylvania militia; Marie promises to wait for Owen while Barbara marries Fritz.

Several years later, Barbara and Fritz have had two children when Henry Muhlenberg informs the family on Christmas Eve that Colonel Armstrong has defeated the Indians in Ohio and recovered all war prisoners. They rush to Carlisle Fort and meet Owen, who tells them that David died in the Battle of Bushy Run. Barbara informs him that Marie remains unmarried, and Owen and Marie embrace. Unable to recognize Regina among the liberated children, Mrs. Leininger sings "Alone yet Not Alone" to them after consulting Colonel Armstrong, rekindling Regina's memories, and she runs into her family's embrace.

Regina never married and lived with her mother until they died, buried together in Stouchsburg, and the town placed a monument honoring her in their gravesite. Barbara continued her life as a farmer in Berks County, eventually had a third child, and named her daughter after her sister. In 1805, she died and lies interred in Cumru Township.

== Cast ==
- Kelly Greyson as Barbara Leininger/Susquehanna
  - Natalie Racoosin as Young Barbara
- Victoria Emmons as Marie LeRoy
  - Kelly Devens as young Marie
- Hayley Lovitt as Regina Leininger/Tskinnak
  - Cassie Brennan as Young Regina
- Robert Pierce as Papa Leininger
- Joanie Stewart as Mama Leininger
- Joseph Gray as John Leininger
- James Hartner as Christian Leininger
- Jenn Gotzon as Lydia Barrett
- Clay Walker as Fritz Hecklinger (Note: Hecklinger is a fictionalized version of Barbara Leininger's real-life husband, Peter Ruffner.)
  - Justin Tully as young Fritz
- Brett Harris as Owen
  - Ian Nelson as young Owen
- John Telfer as David
  - Joshua Hunter Magers as young David
- Ozzie Torres as Galasko
- Tony Wade as Hannawoa
- Ron Pinson Jr. as Chief Selinquaw
- Carl LeMon as Henry Muhlenberg
- Josh Murray as George Washington
- Barry K. Bedwell as Benjamin Franklin
- James McKeny as Edward Braddock
- Joel King as Robert Hunter Morris
- Douglas W. Phillips as Hugh Mercer
- Paul Ganus as John Armstrong Sr.
- Thurman Bryan as Sergeant Mueller

== Release ==
Alone yet Not Alone received a limited theatrical release in nine markets on September 27, 2013, and grossed $125,775 (~$173,839 in 2025) in its opening weekend. By the end of its three-week run on October 11, it had grossed $133,546 at the domestic box office, with a per-screen average of $13,396. The film received a wide release on June 13, 2014, eventually grossing $887,851 against its budget of $7 million, making it a box-office bomb.

== Academy Awards controversy ==
Bruce Broughton and Dennis Spiegel wrote, and Joni Eareckson Tada performed, Alone yet Not Alone's namesake title song. "Alone yet Not Alone" received a nomination for an Academy Award for Best Original Song at the 86th Academy Awards. However, the Academy of Motion Picture Arts and Sciences soon discovered Broughton, former governor and current executive committee member of the academy's music branch, improperly contacting other members of his branch. They thus rescinded their nomination on January 29, 2014. Academy president Cheryl Boone Isaacs claimed that using a position of authority within the academy to promote an Oscar submission "creates the appearance of an unfair advantage."

This incident was not the first time the academy rescinded a nomination. However, it was the first time the Academy cited ethical grounds for it and the first time it did so on a scripted American-produced feature film. Broughton claimed an industry double standard, saying him sending out "70 or so emails" was comparable to Isaacs' involvement in The Artist and The King's Speech as an academy governor.
