= Mike Doyle (actor) =

American actor (born 1972)

- Born: Michael Doyle; September 16, 1972 (age 53)
- Education: Juilliard School (BFA)
- Occupation: Actor
- Years active: 1994–present

Michael Doyle (born September 16, 1972) is an American actor. He is mainly known for his role on Law & Order: Special Victims Unit as Ryan O'Halloran, Adam Guenzel on Oz, and from 2018 to 2023 on New Amsterdam as Martin McIntyre.

== Early life and career ==
Doyle attended the Juilliard School as a member of the Drama Division's Group 27 (1994–1998).

On the set of Oz, Doyle met George Morfogen, whom he would cast in Shiner, a short film written, produced and directed by Doyle that debuted at the 2006 Tribeca Film Festival. Doyle also wrote and produced the 2003 limited-release film Cutter. Doyle also appeared as Jamie Perse, a small-time crook, in the 1996 television miniseries Titanic (also starring Peter Gallagher and Catherine Zeta-Jones).

Doyle played Lt. Cmdr. Tom Palatonio in the 2005 action film Phantom Below. His death in the season 10 finale of Law & Order: Special Victims Unit ended a successful six-year run as forensic tech Ryan O'Halloran on the show. He guest starred on episodes of Criminal Minds and In Plain Sight.

He appeared alongside Nicole Kidman and Aaron Eckhart in 2010's Rabbit Hole. In 2011, the feature film Union Square, co-written and directed by Sundance Film Festival's Grand Jury Award Winner Nancy Savoca, was premiered at the Toronto International Film Festival, which starred Mira Sorvino, Patti Lupone, Michael Rispoli and Tammy Blanchard. He also starred in The Orphan Killer as Marcus Miller Sr. in 2011. He then joined the cast of A Gifted Man as Victor Lantz, an anesthesiologist. He had a recurring role in the 2012 ABC television series 666 Park Avenue.

In 2014, he portrayed songwriter and record producer Bob Crewe in the film of the hit musical Jersey Boys, based on the story of Frankie Valli & the Four Seasons. He also appeared in the music video "I Wanna Get Better" by Jack Antonoff's band Bleachers, alongside Retta. In 2016, Doyle starred as Greg Forrest in the psychological thriller, Amy Makes Three. In 2025, he filmed his third feature Bookends.

== Personal life ==
Doyle is gay. He directed the 2019 independent film Almost Love with gay actors in the leading roles.

== Filmography ==
Film
Year	Title	Role	Notes
1998	Some Girl	Steven	
2003	Cutter	Chet Watson	
2004	The Devil and Daniel Webster	Luke	
2004	Laws of Attraction	Michael Rawson	
2005	29th and Gay	Andy Griffith	
2005	Room Service	Stone	
2006	5up 2down	Disco Dave	
2007	Shortcut to Happiness	Luke	
2007	Heavy Petting	James	
2007	P.S. I Love You	Leprechaun	
2010	Rabbit Hole	Craig	
2011	Green Lantern	Jack Jordan	
2011	Union Square	Bill	
2011	The Orphan Killer	Marcus Miller Sr.	
2012	Gayby	Scott	
2012	The Exhibitionists	George Thornton	
2013	You're Not You	Tom	
2014	Jersey Boys	Bob Crewe	
2015	The Invitation	Tommy	
2016	Max Steel	Jim McGrath	
2016	Amy Makes Three	Greg Forest	Unreleased
2016	Johnny Frank Garrett's Last Word	Adam Redman	
2017	XX	Chet	
2019	Almost Love	—N/a	Director and writer only
2022	Pinball: The Man Who Saved the Game	Jack Haber	
2023	The Kill Room	Rafael Pronto	

Television
Year	Title	Role	Notes
1994	ABC Afterschool Special	Malcolm	Episode: "Magical Make-Over"
1996	A Loss of Innocence	Jens Eriksen	Television film
1996	Titanic	Jamie Perse	Miniseries, 2 episodes
1997	Jenny	Dave	1 episode
1999	ER	Michael McKenna	1 episode
2000	Sex and the City	Mark	2 episodes
2002	Oz	Adam Guenzel	4 episodes
2003–2009	Law & Order: Special Victims Unit	Forensics Tech Ryan O'Halloran	Recurring role, 52 episodes
2003	Ed	Joel McHale	1 episode
2005	Tides of War	Lieutenant Commander Tom E. Palatonio	Television film
2006	Smith	Shawn	1 episode
2009	In Treatment	Bennett Ryan	1 episode
2010	In Plain Sight	Wade Guthrie	1 episode
2010	Criminal Minds	Deputy Ronald Boyd	Episode: "A Rite of Passage"
2011	The Whole Truth	Michael Dalton	2 episodes
2011	Lights Out	Doctor Brennan	3 episodes
2011–2012	A Gifted Man	Victor Lantz	Recurring role, 11 episodes
2012	The Good Wife	Officer Mallen	1 episode
2012	666 Park Avenue	Frank Alpern	1 episode
2013	Shameless	Lanier	2 episodes
2014	Rush	Dr. Griffin Wagner	1 episode
2014	The Blacklist	Patrick Chandler	2 episodes
2014	Unforgettable	John Hibbert	1 episode
2015	Blindspot	Nathan Williams	1 episode
2016–2017	Conviction	Rodney Landon	2 episodes
2017	Lucifer	Bradley	1 episode
2018	Narcos: Mexico	Thomas Buehl	3 episodes
2018	The Romanoffs	Brian Norris	Episode: "House of Special Purpose"
2018–2023	New Amsterdam	Martin McIntyre	Recurring role, 29 episodes
2019–2021	City on a Hill	Josh Goshen	Recurring role, 5 episodes
2024	Fallout	Bob Spencer	Episode: "The End"
2024	Law & Order	Terry Clausen	Episode: "Report Card"
