= Return to the Hiding Place =

- Directed by: Peter C. Spencer; Josiah Spencer
- Written by: Peter C. Spencer
- Produced by: Petra Spencer Pearce
- Starring: Craig Robert Young; David Thomas Jenkins; Rachel Spencer Hewitt; John Rhys-Davies
- Cinematography: Philip Roy
- Edited by: Josiah Spencer
- Production company: 10 West Studios
- Distributed by: Spencer Productions; 10 West Studios
- Release date: February 2013 (San Antonio Christian Independent Film Festival)
- Running time: 123 minutes
- Country: United States
- Language: English

Return to the Hiding Place is a 2013 film based upon the factual accounting of Hans Poley's World War II encounter with Corrie ten Boom, her involvement in the Dutch resistance and the wartime harboring of Jewish refugees. A non-Jewish fugitive after he refused to pledge his allegiance to the Nazis, Poley was the first person hidden from the Nazis in the Ten Boom House, which is today a museum in Haarlem, Netherlands. The film is adapted, in part, from Poley's book, Return to the Hiding Place (1993), personal recollections, relayed to screenwriter Dr. Peter C. Spencer, and research from the Dutch National Archives. The film is neither a prequel nor is it a sequel to the 1975 film The Hiding Place, instead, it is a congruent accounting of the Dutch underground's resistance efforts from Poley's perspective. It was directed by Peter C. Spencer and starred John Rhys-Davies, Mimi Sagadin and Craig Robert Young.

== Background ==
On May 15, 1940, German occupation of the Netherlands begins with the nation's surrender, food and materials are rationed and evening curfews are imposed, gradually tightening from 10:00 p.m. to 6:00 a.m. Persecution of the Jewish population also is gradually implemented, starting with the requirement of wearing a yellow star bearing the word "Jew" and attacks against Jewish businesses and places of worship and culminating in the mass transport of Jewish citizens to unknown locations. Conspiracy theories begin to emerge on the fate of those being transported to the concentration camps.

Corrie ten Boom (15 April 1892 – 15 April 1983) and her family are actively involved in the Dutch underground, invite the persecuted to live in their home and create a hidden room to conceal them during searches. Hans Poley, a young Christian, is the first guest and benefactor of the ten Boom family's extraordinary hospitality in May 1943.

Poley's persecution begins with his refusal to sign the Nazi Manifesto, which reads in part:

23. We demand legal opposition to known lies and their promulgation through the press. In order to enable the provision of a German press, we demand, that:

a. All writers and employees of the newspapers appearing in the German language be members of the race;
b. Non-German newspapers be required to have the express permission of the State to be published. They may not be printed in the German language;
c. Non-Germans are forbidden by law any financial interest in German publications, or any influence on them, and as punishment for violations the closing of such a publication as well as the immediate expulsion from the Reich of the non-German concerned. Publications that are counter to the general good are to be forbidden. We demand legal prosecution of artistic and literary forms which exert a destructive influence on our national life, and the closure of organizations opposing the above-made demands.

24. We demand freedom of religion for all religious denominations within the state so long as they do not endanger its existence or oppose the moral senses of the Germanic race. The Party as such advocates the standpoint of a positive Christianity without binding itself confessionally to any one denomination. It combats the Jewish-materialistic spirit within and around us, and is convinced that a lasting recovery of our nation can only succeed from within the framework: The good of the state before the good of the individual.

25. For the execution of all of this we demand the formation of a strong central power in the Reich. Unlimited authority of the central parliament over the whole Reich and its organizations in general. The forming of state and profession chambers for the execution of the laws made by the Reich within the various states of the confederation. The leaders of the Party promise, if necessary by sacrificing their own lives, to support the execution of the points set forth above without consideration.

== Cast ==
Cast overview, first billed only:

- John Rhys-Davies Eusi
- Mimi Sagadin Corrie ten Boom
- Craig Robert Young Piet Hartog
- David Thomas Jenkins Hans Poley
- Rachel Spencer Hewitt Aty van Woerden
- Stass Klassen Colonel von Laeman
- Joanie Stewart Betsie ten Boom
- Suzy Brack Nollie ten Boom van Woerden
- Joshua Patrick Atkinson Boris
- Gary Moore Lars
- Max Van Bel Frans van Hasselt
- Slate Holmgren Kris Holmstra
- Louie Lawless Board Member
- Steve Christopher Laurent Mathijs
- Leo Wyndham Leo

== Filming locations ==
- Haarlem, North Holland, Netherlands
- Holland, Michigan, USA
- Manistee, Michigan, USA

== Awards ==
Return to the Hiding Place
Year	Nominee / work	Award	Result
2013	San Antonio Independent Christian Film Festival	Audience Choice Award	Won
2013	San Antonio Independent Christian Film Festival	Best Feature Film	Won
2013	Accolade Competition	Award of Excellence Feature Film	Won
2013	Central Florida Film Festival	Festival Prize Best Feature Film	Won
2013	Bel Air Film Festival	Best Jury Feature: Film	Won
2013	Bel Air Film Festival	Best Jury Feature: Cinematography	Won
2013	Bel Air Film Festival	Best Jury Feature: Directing	Won

== See also ==
- Return to the Hiding Place, by Hans Poley, Lifejourney Books (1993) ISBN 0781409322
- The Hiding Place, a 1971 autobiography by Corrie ten Boom
- The Hiding Place, a 1975 film based on the book by Corrie ten Boom
