= York Shackleton =

American actor

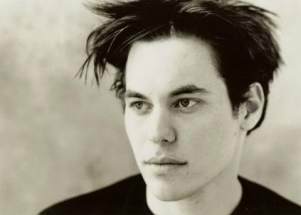
- Born: York Alec Shackleton; August 23, 1974 (age 51); Palm Springs, California, U.S.
- Occupation: Filmmaker
- Years active: 1991–present

York Shackleton (born August 23, 1974) is an American filmmaker and former professional snowboarder. Shackleton is best known for films like Kush and the television show MTV'S Undressed.

== Biography ==
=== Early life ===
Shackleton was born in Palm Springs, California, the son of Susan (Mason), a school teacher, and Richard Shackleton. He was raised in Palm Springs and attended Palm Springs High School.

=== Snowboarding ===
York Shackleton was a prominent professional snowboarder in the early to late 1990s. Notable trick performed by Shackleton included: Rodeo flip, or the frontside rodeo.

Shackleton was one of the first snowboarders to receive an endorsement deal with Airwalk.

In 1998, York Shackleton's snowboarding was featured in the show Snow'd In, a show produced by MTV.

=== Film and television career ===
Inspired to tap into the commercial aspect of the sport, York took his tricks in front of the camera, appearing in hundreds of national commercials for products like Mountain Dew, Taco Bell, Airwalk, Right Guard, Levi’s and many others.

York then turned up alongside Dominique Swain, Selma Blair, Summer Phoenix, Chris Masterson and Sean Patrick Flanery in Jonathan Kahn's Girl. Shackleton quickly landed a lead role in I Know What You Did Last Winter and received high marks from both critics and audiences. After appearing in several Independent films and starring in the MTV series Undressed, York crossed over into production circles with his motion picture writing and directing debut, Stealing Roy. Premiering on the internet web site I-FILM, the picture soon garnered a Pixie Award Nomination for Best Short Screenplay. Stealing Roy continues to play on I-Film and has had over 3,000,000 viewers to date.

Shackleton then went on to write produce and direct his first feature-length film. Las Paraditas, a documentary exploring the rampant violence and exposing the corruption that surrounds the prostitutes of Tijuana, Mexico. “Las Paraditas” (2000) screened at the Cannes Film Market. Immediately after York was invited to attend film classes for free at UCLA. Focusing his studies on development, marketing, and distribution, he studied and worked closely with veteran film producer Lenny Shapiro and the pair began to develop films together.

In 2005, York produced the film Roman. A companion piece to Lucky McKee’s cult horror classic May. Roman starred Kristen Bell and Lucky McKee and was directed by horror queen Angela Bettis. The film has played at film festivals around the world including Berlin International Film Festival and Fangoria L.A. Following the release of Roman, Shackleton went on to write, produce and directed the cult film, Kush Starring William Atherton, Mike Erwin and Lyn Shea. Kush takes a real look into the lives of rich white kids from the San Fernando Valley, so bored they become drug dealers and end up losing big.

York Shackleton currently has multiple projects in pre-production and production. These include:

Street is written and directed by Shackleton and stars Laura Ramsey, Toby Hemingway, Vivica A. Fox and Theresa Russell and is about a teenage girl who runs away and finds herself living on the streets of Portland and in love with a heroin addict. She ends up pregnant and alone only to try to make it home to the place she left in the first place.

York is scheduled to write and direct a feature film on Jerry Roach's famous punk rock club from the early eighties, Cuckoo's Nest.

== Filmography ==
- Stealing Roy (2000)
- Las Paraditas (2003)
- Roman (2004)
- Kush (2005)
- Street (2007)
- Urban Struggle (2009)
- Puta (2011)
- 1 Out Of 7 (2011)
- The Fukushima 50 (2012)
- The Actor (2013)
- Pretty Perfect (2014)
- 211 (2018)
- Disturbing the Peace (2020)

=== Television ===
- Undressed (1997)
