= List of S.W.A.T. (2017 TV series) episodes =

S.W.A.T. is an American crime action drama television series, based on the 1975 television series of the same name created by Robert Hamner and developed by Rick Husky. The new series was developed by Aaron Rahsaan Thomas and Shawn Ryan, and premiered on CBS on November 2, 2017. The series is produced by Original Film, CBS Studios and Sony Pictures Television. In April 2021, the series was renewed for a fifth season which premiered on October 1, 2021. In April 2022, CBS renewed the series for a sixth season which premiered on October 7, 2022. In May 2023, CBS renewed S.W.A.T. for a seventh and final season. In April 2024, the final season decision was reversed and the show was renewed for an eighth season. The eighth season premiered on October 18, 2024. During the course of the series, 163 episodes of S.W.A.T. aired over eight seasons, between November 2, 2017, and May 16, 2025.

== Series overview ==
Season	Episodes	Originally released	
Season	Episodes	First released	Last released
1	22	November 2, 2017	May 17, 2018
2	23	September 27, 2018	May 16, 2019
3	21	October 2, 2019	May 20, 2020
4	18	November 11, 2020	May 26, 2021
5	22	October 1, 2021	May 22, 2022
6	22	October 7, 2022	May 19, 2023
7	13	February 16, 2024	May 17, 2024
8	22	October 18, 2024	May 16, 2025

== Episodes ==
=== Season 1 (2017–18) ===
No. overall	No. in season	Title	Directed by	Written by	Original release date	Prod. code	U.S. viewers (millions)
1	1	"Pilot"	Justin Lin	Aaron Rahsaan Thomas & Shawn Ryan	November 2, 2017	100	6.74
Sergeant Daniel "Hondo" Harrelson is tasked to run an elite S.W.A.T. unit for the LAPD after his original team leader William "Buck" Spivey, was fired after accidentally shooting an unarmed black teenager during a shootout. To fill the void left by Spivey, a wild officer, Jim Street, is recruited into the team. Hondo must quickly establish his right to be leader, and their issues escalate when another shooting occurs at a protest to the previous shooting. Hondo learns that Buck saw potential in Street and vows to make the best of his inclusion as advised. The police gradually realise that the entire spat is not about simple racial issues, but a political one. Uncovering more clues of their previous suspects involvement in manipulating the police, Hondo and his team race to rescue Mumford and his team in an ambush and take out the remaining suspects.
2	2	"Cuchillo"	Billy Gierhart	Craig Gore	November 9, 2017	101	6.59
After multiple inmates escape a prison transport, the team must hunt down the fugitives including a psychopath called 'Cuchillo' that Jessica caught before transferring to S.W.A.T. As Hondo and Mumford's teams round up the other 3 fugitives, Street's lone-wolf mentality causes tension as Hondo is pressured to either rein him in or cut him loose. Meanwhile, Jessica and Hondo both agree to maintain their relationship without letting anyone know.
3	3	"Pamilya"	Billy Gierhart	Sam Humphrey	November 16, 2017	103	6.26
S.W.A.T is tasked with tracking down drug smugglers who are using human trafficking victims as drug mules. Meanwhile, Luca is in need of a place to stay after a break up, but knowing what a bad houseguest he is, no-one on the team is willing to help. Also, while doing a favor for his incarcerated mother, Street ends up attacking a civilian and puts both his career and Hondo's ability to be a leader into question. Hondo discovers that Karen Street misled her son into attacking an associate of her smuggling operation, and tells her to leave her son alone before she destroys his career.
4	4	"Radical"	Greg Beeman	Kent Rotherham	November 23, 2017	102	5.84
During a party to "celebrate" Hondo becoming a media sensation for his helicopter stunt, the S.W.A.T. team are called when a suspected homemade terrorist accidentally blows himself and most of his building up in a Highland Park explosion. While the FBI use the explosion as a justification for arresting suspected terrorists on a watch list, Hondo learns that there are several explosives missing, and the team must race against the clock to find the partner. Meanwhile, Cortez begins to panic when Deacon's wife Annie reveals gossip that Hondo is in a relationship. Also, Hondo reaches out for Buck who is isolating himself following his firing.
5	5	"Imposters"	Guy Ferland	VJ Boyd	November 30, 2017	105	6.71
The S.W.A.T. team deals with a gang of robbers posing as a S.W.A.T. officers, but the recently burglarized family is suspected of hiding something. Chris manages to connect with the daughter, who gradually reveals that she was forced by the robbers to confess her dirtiest thoughts and desires on video or her parents would be killed. Another girl is found to be a victim of the same robbers on a previous occasion, and they soon learn that a fellow student planned all the burglaries and humiliations to get back at them over a past grudge. Meanwhile, Deacon and Luca are assigned as security detail for a visiting professional hockey player who has been receiving death threats, but his troublemaking attitude complicates matters further, notably forcing them to tackle several people at a bar he manages to wind up.: This is the first episode of the SWAT series to have David Lim as Victor Tan credited as series regular.
6	6	"Octane"	Eagle Egilsson	Michael Jones-Morales	December 7, 2017	104	6.25
After being contacted by criminals reaching out for his old undercover alias, Street is forced to go back undercover into the world of high-end car theft in order to dismantle a ring he tried to earlier in his career. Things go bad when the paranoid mastermind behind the ring starts to question loyalty after discovering that one of his crew members lied about his identity. Meanwhile, Deacon grows suspicious when a climbing instructor evaluates Chris' performance poorly, but Chris herself is undeterred.
7	7	"Homecoming"	John Showalter	Alison Cross	December 14, 2017	106	6.45
Hondo's incarcerated friend Leroy asks him for a favor - to safeguard his son Daryl after he was witness to a drive-by shooting. Hondo secures Daryl after he attempts to buy a gun, but he isn't charged as it was a setup meant for them to reach him. After an attorney is killed, the pressure to find the killer increases as evidence becomes clear that it was a professional hit just like the first one. SWAT and the LAPD race to secure the next victims before they are killed, acting on intel from Leroy about the mastermind's connection to the gang environment. Meanwhile, Luca's grandfather, original S.W.A.T member Jack Luca, has died and Luca struggles to deal with the loss.
8	8	"Miracle"	Holly Dale	A.C. Allen	December 21, 2017	107	6.28
During Christmas Eve, a drug cartel's cache of gold bars is stolen, forcing the S.W.A.T team to put their vacation on hold to apprehend the thieves with the help of a conspirator who they catch before she can. Meanwhile, Jessica's proposal for renewing the department gains the attention of the President of the Police Commissioner Board, Michael Plank. Though Plank supports her ideas, he thinks they need to be watered down in order to be passed and adopted by the department.
9	9	"Blindspots"	Billy Gierhart	Michael Gemballa	January 4, 2018	108	6.21
During the investigation into an armed robbery, Deacon is temporarily placed in charge of the team when Hondo is taken off duty due to a strange misconduct complaint: an unknown male claiming Hondo used his police authority to rob him. Tan turns to an old informant, Allie, with whom he has past history. This leads to her only being willing to negotiate through Street, but Tan later tries to recuperate their feelings. However, once the robbers are caught, but their stash undiscovered, Tan concludes that Allie made her escape with the money, being officially done with him.
10	10	"Seizure"	Larry Teng	Aaron Rahsaan Thomas	January 11, 2018	109	6.38
The team is sent on a rescue mission in a maximum security prison riot. They split up in order to combat three different gang factions within the prison. As they gradually take the inmates down and free the trapped guards, they also notice signs the prison is not up to code and the fact that the prison is being used as a forced labor factory. Meanwhile, Deacon's wife Annie has a stroke while visiting Hicks and is rushed into emergency surgery.
11	11	"K-Town"	Omar Madha	Craig Gore	January 18, 2018	110	6.02
Hondo's team participates in a joint LAPD-DEA Task force to apprehend local Korean drug smugglers and manage to sneak in and steal a stash of fentanyl disguised as robbers. Next they focus on who could be the possible top dog of the Korean gang, the Golden Boys, and the smuggling network overall. However, everything turns sour when key figures with close ties to network wind up dead, and DEA agent Katrina Walsh's son is kidnapped by the gang, aiming to force them to hand back the fentanyl. Meanwhile, Annie Kay collapses again and is operated on for a second time. Jessica, with the help of Plank, gets a specialist to help with the surgery.
12	12	"Contamination"	Elodie Keene	Robert Wittstadt	February 1, 2018	111	6.23
Working again with FBI Agent DuBois, Hondo and the team are on the hunt for two Sovereigns who possess barrels of cyanide and are planning to use them to poison the city, but the only link they have to finding them is a wife who refuses to acknowledge that her husband is about to commit domestic terrorism. Chris struggles with the case as one of the sovereigns shot an academy friend of hers who attempted to detain the sovereigns. Meanwhile, Jessica faces opposition from Hicks about her planned reforms despite Plank and her signing off on them.
13	13	"Fences"	Alex Graves	Sam Humphrey	March 1, 2018	112	5.32
An ICE raid leaves Street in hot water when he inadvertently violates LA's sanctuary city policy and a young man is faced with deportation. When the younger sister orchestrates a rally outside the police precinct, the team faces the daunting task of protecting her from a group of men looking to deport immigrants by any means, even though no one will let them near her. Meanwhile, after Jessica's tires are slashed in response to her plans, the president of the police commission finds out about Hondo and Jessica's secret romantic relationship. Unwilling to back her unless she acknowledges her hypocrisy, he gives them the ultimatum of choosing either their relationship or their careers.
14	14	"Ghosts"	John Showalter	Michael Jones-Morales	March 8, 2018	113	5.57
When a serial killer from Luca's past who was thought to have been killed in an explosion two years prior resurfaces, the S.W.A.T team must capture him, this time for good. Meanwhile, Hondo grows more concerned about Buck as he begins to descend into depression following his firing. Later, Jessica gets a threatening letter personally delivered to her desk which, coupled with the attack on her car, forces her and Hicks to realise the suspect is a cop.
15	15	"Crews"	Hanelle M. Culpepper	V.J. Boyd	March 29, 2018	114	5.26
Hondo's good friend and trusted criminal informant Craig is killed while seeking information about a robbery crew that a joint S.W.A.T and FBI task force is trying to capture. Things get complicated when Cortez begins to suspect FBI Agent DuBois, the agent in charge, has a drug problem which she refuses to admit.
16	16	"Payback"	Billy Gierhart	Alison Cross	April 5, 2018	115	5.05
A young heiress is kidnapped for ransom, and the team links up with her former Marine bodyguard and goes on a citywide search to bring her home before she is harmed. However, when the suspects turn out to be former members of the same private protection service as the bodyguard, they are forced to question whether the family were the real targets. Meanwhile, the team worries that Mumford is moving too fast when he announces he's getting married for the fourth time after only knowing his new lady friend for a month.
17	17	"Armory"	Rob J. Greenlea	Craig Gore	April 12, 2018	116	5.31
The S.W.A.T team arrests a former gang member who has taken a family hostage, but the mission takes a dangerous turn when he escapes and holds Cortez and Plank captive inside S.W.A.T's armory. The former gang member wants the team to find his sister, who has been kidnapped because he refused to commit a robbery. Meanwhile, after accidentally destroying a teenager’s scholarship competition entry Quadcopter, Deacon, Luca, and Tan make up for it by giving the kid access to S.W.A.Ts hardware depot to help him rebuild it.
18	18	"Patrol"	Norberto Barba	A.C. Allen	April 19, 2018	117	5.32
On their monthly patrol day, Chris and Mumford must deal with a psychiatric patient on a shooting spree. They attempt to stop him as he shoots up an office building, and Chris ends up fighting him until he escapes. Deacon and Luca play host to a group of troubled children, during which Luca discovers that one of them has dyslexia. Tan and Street must recover Tan's stolen radio from an opportunistic cheerleader. Meanwhile, Hondo travels to Oakland to help his half-sister convince their stubborn and ill father to move to L.A. with them.
19	19	"Source"	Doug Aarniokoski	Michael Gemballa	April 26, 2018	118	5.22
The S.W.A.T. team is assigned to protect a high-profile Russian journalist who is visiting Los Angeles from assassins but, when her unwillingness to cooperate results in a shootout, Hondo forces her to reveal that she is on the verge of uncovering a massive weapons smuggling operation and is trying to meet a source who will provide the final key. Meanwhile, with only days left on her incarceration sentence, Street deals with a personal crisis over letting his mother live with him, which forces Luca to once again look for a place to stay. Desperate to avoid his unwelcome presence in their homes, the rest of the team try to find a place for him and the reason for why he refuses to commit to a permanent home.
20	20	"Vendetta"	Billy Gierhart	Kent Rotherham	May 3, 2018	119	5.09
Following up on what transpired in the episode K-Town, Hondo's clandestine surveillance on Jae Kim lands him in hot water with the L.A.P.D. commanding officers after he is the target of an assassination attempt. Hondo is benched while the team follows up on his investigation, but trouble arises when former DEA Agent KC Walsh, Hondo's contact, is discovered with the dead body of the only man who could testify against Kim.
21	21	"Hunted"	Nina Lopez-Corrado	Matthew T. Brown	May 10, 2018	120	5.54
When a gang of bikers starts brazenly killing their rivals, Deacon suggests a visit to his former patrol partner, who used to be undercover in the gang, while Mumford's team tries to round up the gang's members. Upon arriving at the ex-cop's cabin, Deacon and Hondo are ambushed and forced to flee into the woods, learning that Deacon's former partner changed sides after his retirement and now is genuinely in league with the gang. Meanwhile, Chris searches for the truth about a female S.W.A.T. candidate in order to help her pass selection.
22	22	"Hoax"	Billy Gierhart	Aaron Rahsaan Thomas	May 17, 2018	121	6.03
After responding to a fake 911 call, the team must race against the clock to stop bomb threats throughout the city from a white supremacy hate group. In order to facilitate the search, Hondo enlists the aid of his childhood friends and his father to help identify their suspects, and later to evacuate a park festival after identifying it as the target for the supremacist group. Meanwhile, Street's relationship with the team is strained when he has to deal with a crisis involving his mother and uncle. The crisis is resolved when his mother returns a necklace that belonged to his grandmother. During the aftermath, Street is demoted to patrol for lying to Hondo and skips attending Deacon's wedding vow renewal. Also, Cortez also learns on a televised broadcast that Plank is running for governor. Note: This episode marks the final regular appearance of Peter Onorati (Jeff Mumford).

=== Season 2 (2018–19) ===
No. overall	No. in season	Title	Directed by	Written by	Original release date	Prod. code	U.S. viewers (millions)
23	1	"Shaky Town"	Billy Gierhart	Michael Jones-Morales	September 27, 2018	201	4.70
While attempting to arrest a known leader of a human-trafficking ring, the entire team runs into complications caused by an earthquake. Deacon finds himself trapped under rubble alongside a Haitian man on a mission to save his sons. After some hesitation, the man helps him from the rubble and later provides more information about the ring. Meanwhile, Street struggles with mending fences with the team while also adjusting to being a patrol officer rather than S.W.A.T. Jessica and Hicks attempt to convince the new commissioner to not push through a 15% budget cut to S. W. A. T., which later convinces her following the quake, but argues that the math is not on their side. Hondo meets Nia Wells, a Deputy District Attorney in the process of getting divorced, at a hotel bar and spends the night with her but, when he goes to check on her at the hospital after the quake, he discovers her soon-to-be ex-husband at her bedside. Note: This episode aired just days after the season premiere of "9-1-1," which also dealt with a massive earthquake striking L.A.--and both also had characters commenting that it was larger than the Northridge quake of 1994. It's also the first episode to have Patrick St. Esprit (Robert Hicks) credited as a series regular.
24	2	"Gasoline Drum"	John Showalter	Aaron Rahsaan Thomas	October 4, 2018	202	5.21
The team races against the clock to apprehend the leader of the Turkish drug cartel who is aiming to retrieve his son and stashed money that his wife is attempting to claim to secure a better life for her and the children. The team also receives the help from a rogue Turkish Interpol agent, who Jessica knows from before. Meanwhile, Hondo learns that Leroy's son Daryl has returned to LA and is being arrested for a robbery. Leroy attempts to convince him to get his life back on track, but is unsuccessful and is convinced it might be Daryl's fate. Luca asks Hicks to be signed up for a police house in East Hollywood, despite some hesitation.
25	3	"Fire and Smoke"	Billy Gierhart	Alison Cross	October 11, 2018	203	5.40
The S.W.A.T team works with District Attorney Nia Wells to protect the jurors of a high profile case when their families are being targeted with bombs, but one claims the life of the star witness. The acts are traced back to the Armenian mafia, where one of them is on trial for bribery and corruption against city officials. But when the alternate jurors reach a deadlock in a second trial, the team goes after another mobster responsible for protecting the Armenian on trial, while additionally saving the witness' husband, who attempted to take matters into his own hands. Meanwhile, Cortez learns that due to budget cuts, members of S.W.A.T. will have to return to patrol, putting some of their careers, including Tan's, in jeopardy. Also, Hondo helps his father look for his car, which he used to pay bail for a young man so he could keep his job.
26	4	"Saving Face"	Bill Roe	A.C. Allen	October 18, 2018	204	5.49
The S.W.A.T team works with Eric Wells, a U.S. Marshal (who happens to be Nia's estranged husband) to detain a fugitive and their gang who are robbing drug cargo shipments. Hondo can't help but be suspicious of Eric's true motives, especially after learning Eric orchestrated his assignment to the case because he wanted to profile Hondo. Meanwhile, after Street catches his mother buying and keeping cocaine in her purse, he calls her out for being selfish and moves out immediately. In the end, Street and Hondo make up and Street expresses to Hondo his desire to be back on S.W.A.T. Because he never went through it the first time, Hondo tells Street to enlist in the S.W.A.T. academy.
27	5	"S.O.S."	Larry Teng	Andrew Dettmann	October 25, 2018	205	5.36
Hondo and Chris infiltrate a hijacked cruise ship in an effort to undermine the hijackers' plan to escape with smuggled drugs while the rest of the team works from the outside to determine the identity of the criminals. Meanwhile, Street endures his first day at S.W.A.T. academy, which proves difficult as Luca still bears a grudge, but they ultimately make up in an effort to help him win a bet against Mumford.
28	6	"Never Again"	Marc Roskin	Craig Gore	November 1, 2018	206	5.22
A group of well-organized and heavily-armed robbers hits several diamond merchants across downtown Los Angeles and The S.W.A.T. team tries to determine the next target. Cortez reveals that the three merchants are connected to the Israeli mafia and she reaches out to their top enforcer (who previously helped her against the Russian mob), to try to prevent a blood bath. After Hondo kills one of the suspects in a shootout, they discover the suspects are Israeli women on student visas with a very personal motive. Meawhile, Street worries that Luca, his S.W.A.T. training academy instructor, has a personal vendetta against him. Also, Chris contemplates an unorthodox proposition from the new woman she's dating: a triad relationship with her boyfriend.
29	7	"Inheritance"	Romeo Tirone	Kent Rotherham	November 8, 2018	207	5.13
When a young woman, daughter of an internet mogul, and her boyfriend are kidnapped by a group of criminals with similar motives and tactics as the Symbionese Liberation Army in Patty Hearst's kidnapping, the S.W.A.T team reviews Luca's late grandfather's journal with assistance from his father, Carl. Meanwhile, Hondo travels to Arizona with Nia for a S.W.A.T training seminar and encounters apparent racial profiling by a state trooper.
30	8	"The Tiffany Experience"	Guy Ferland	VJ Boyd	November 15, 2018	208	5.13
The team deals with the psychotic fan of a female vlogger who wants to be her boyfriend by killing anyone around her. Unfortunately, the vlogger is far more interested in capitalizing on the experience to boost her fanbase and become more infamous, not seeming to care just how many innocent people are at risk in the process. Meanwhile, Hondo advises Luca to make amends with Street as a measure to make him ease on his weight of responsibilities. Also, Chris faces tensions among her teammates over her polyamory relationship, and later decides to enter it after some hesitation.
31	9	"Day Off"	Lexi Alexander	Sarah Alderson	November 29, 2018	209	5.20
During their day off, Street and Chris help Luca renovate his new home, though she has to resort to calling her builder uncle to solve the house's problems. Outside the house, they run into a trio of gangsters who have taken a children's park as their own. Chris' builder uncle helps them refurbish the children's park into a basketball field, but despite their kind gesture, the neighbourhood gang makes it clear that their presence is unwanted. During a hostage situation, Mumford discovers one of the hostages is a wanted suspect and they have to find him before he achieves his vengeance by murdering those he holds responsible for his past pain. Meanwhile, Hondo searches for a serial rapist after rescuing his sister Brianna when she is drugged in a nightclub.
32	10	"1000 Joules"	David Rodriguez	Craig Gore	December 6, 2018	210	5.34
When dozens of DNA kits and evidence kits from the LAPD crime lab are stolen and one of the technicians is injured (Rebecca, who happens to be a close friend to Hicks), the S.W.A.T team work with Nia Wells as they go on an all-out hunt to recover the kits. Though at first they think the thief was related to a criminal waiting for trial, they end up discovering the thief was someone wanting to profit from selling the evidence to the culprits. Meanwhile, Deacon faces financial difficulties, which makes it hard for him to focus as the leader of the S.W.A.T annual holiday toy drive.
33	11	"School"	Billy Gierhart	Robert Wittstadt	January 3, 2019	211	5.99
In 2013, Hondo and his team faced a school shooting at Riverhill High School, in which six students died. Six years later, the deceased shooter's mother receives a manifesto letter from someone seeking to shoot up a school with a higher body count, and she hands the letter to the police. The police gradually determine that the new shooter, Vince France, plans to shoot up his old school, Leighton High School. Note: Shemar Moore, Alex Russell, Lina Esco, and Jay Harrington appeared in a public service announcement alongside Lt. Aaron Pisarzewicz from Los Angeles School Police Department's School Safety Initiative Division.
34	12	"Los Huesos"	Alex Kalymnios	Michael Jones-Morales	January 10, 2019	212	5.91
Jessica and Chris go on an undercover mission in Mexico City (without any back-up) to rescue US federal agent Adrian Cruz who has been kidnapped by the Los Huesos cartel that Jessica worked undercover in a few years ago. While she and Chris infiltrate the cartel in Mexico, Hondo and his team track down the leader's butcher, who is torturing Cruz in an undisclosed location. Meanwhile, Hondo engages in small home renovation projects, which worries his mother Charice, that he has something that is causing him emotional strain. Note: The episode is partially filmed in Mexico City, Mexico.
35	13	"Encore"	Rob Greenlea	Munis Rashid	January 31, 2019	213	5.68
Five low-level employees from five major companies are kidnapped by the Emancipators (the group the team first encountered during the SLA-like kidnapping case) and the companies are held to ransom for the amount they have avoided paying in taxes. Hondo's emotional turmoil starts to get the best of him when he lashes out at the team for allowing one of them to escape.
36	14	"The B-Team"	Maja Vrvilo	VJ Boyd	February 7, 2019	214	4.96
The S.W.A.T team works with the FBI to stop a separatist from the Okinawa separatist movement who is trying to use weapons-grade plutonium for a terrorist plot. During the investigation, Hondo encounters a former fling, Elle Trask, who heads the counterterrorism unit. However, her investigation and tactics clash with the police's and her boss downgrades SWAT to sweep prior suspects' residences. Meanwhile, the team participates in law enforcement's annual charity competition against the Los Angeles Fire Department. Also, Chris is eager about having a baby shower for Deacon's new child, which he deems unnecessary at first, until she gives valuable insight from her own childhood. Note: NFL pro-football players Willie McGinest, James Harrison, and Eric Dickerson guest star as members of the LAFD.
37	15	"Fallen"	Guy Ferland	Michael Gemballa	February 14, 2019	215	5.59
When two patrol officers are killed in a series of random shootings, the team goes on the hunt to find the perpetrators and discovers the shooters are after two dirty cops, responsible for the death of the brother of one of the shooters by arresting him on false charges. The case brings up old wounds for Chris, who worked for the crime unit, where she dated one of the dirty cops and later broke up with him when she suspected he was dirty. Meanwhile, Deacon and his wife, Annie, welcome their fourth child, who they name Victoria.
38	16	"Pride"	Nina Lopez-Corrado	Matthew T. Brown	February 21, 2019	216	5.47
The team have their hands full safeguarding the LGBTQ Pride event in Los Angeles when a hate crime threatens to ignite more violence. Things escalate when a gay-rights activist takes a right wing talk show host and his production crew hostage in retaliation. SWAT manages to end the situation and arrest the activist, but he is executed as he is about to be transported. As the case hits close to home for Chris, it also reunite Hicks with his estranged son, JP, a former drug-addict turned gay-rights activist. Meanwhile, Street worries his mother will be sent back to prison when she misses her last two parole meets. Also, Deacon receives unexpected news regarding his newborn daughter Victoria, who needs an operation. Unable to get a loan from a bank, Deacon has to resort to a loan shark he once arrested, Mickey.
39	17	"Jack"	Larry Teng	Kent Rotherham	March 7, 2019	217	5.58
The team tries to zero in on a carjacking ring, but things get complicated when they discover heroin hidden in the cars, which it's revealed that the Sicilian mob hired the carjackers in order to get the heroin back. After SWAT arrests them and their hacker, the mob amps up the game and goes after the last car themselves with abducting Whip, (who Street befriended during his undercover assignment in season 1). Mumford contemplates his future in S.W.A.T after being nearly fatally shot. After the case is resolved, Mumford decides to give his 30-day notice. Meanwhile, Hondo decides to take Daryl in to stay with him and his mother after facing familiar complications for Daryl's mother regaining custody. Also, Deacon has problems returning the loan due to being on sick leave, so Mickey asks for a favor instead, which involves going after an illegal poker game held in Mickey's mother's neighbourhood.
40	18	"Cash Flow"	Billy Gierhart	Andrew Dettmann & Amelia Sims	April 4, 2019	218	4.73
The case of an escaped convict who was broken out of the prison by criminals using stolen military weaponry reunites Hondo with a fellow Marine Ruiz, with whom he served in Somalia 20 years ago. When the weapons turn out to have been stolen from Ruiz's base, he tries to take over, but they're forced to push away their differences to recover the weapons and stop the criminals. Meanwhile, when Deacon can't fully pay his debt quota, Mickey asks for another favor instead. After almost stealing stolen cash in desperation, he finally comes clean to Hondo. He and Luca pay off the debt and warn Mickey off Deacon. Also, Chris prepares for a difficult farewell to her former K-9 partner, Champ, when he falls terminally ill, forcing her to face some truths about her relationship with Ty and Kira after some advice from Street.
41	19	"Invisible"	John Terlesky	A.C. Allen	April 18, 2019	219	5.09
Luca, Street, and Chris respond to a potential abduction of their closest neighbor, Timo. After they find him, they discover he witnessed a kidnapping perpetrated by two ICE agent impostors who gain access to upscale neighborhoods by targeting domestic workers. Mumford and his team are called upon as the police get further leads on the perpetrators' next targets. But given the property's advanced security systems, they request it to be shut down in order to move in. However, the lead perpetrator orders them back out or the family is killed. Meanwhile, Hondo visits a potential foster family for Daryl, who give of a good impression, but he sees a lack of love and compassion for the children, which makes him reject their candidacy. After contemplating his options, Hondo decides to adopt Daryl into his family. The S.W.A.T division prepares a retirement send-off party for Mumford.
42	20	"Rocket Fuel"	Laura Belsey	Craig Gore & Ryan Keleher	April 25, 2019	220	5.01
The squad deals with finding PCP nicknamed "Rocket Fuel" which has been on the street for decades and killed many, including Tan's cousin. He turns to a now retired cop, Ben Mosley, who worked on the case and he gives them some insight into the individuals possibly involved in the PCP creator's return. Meanwhile, Hondo struggles to encourage Daryl as he keeps getting rejected during his job interviews. Also, Street worries when his missing mother commits credit card fraud. Chris is surprised when Ty and Kira asks her to move in with them, which she later comes to accept.
43	21	"Day of Dread"	Alrick Riley	Alison Cross	May 2, 2019	221	5.00
Hondo's leadership is called into question when the squad finds themselves under internal investigation after an attempt to capture the most wanted criminal inadvertently results in the death of a civilian. The investigation forces the team to detail everything that happened until the civilian's death, with focus on Hondo's call, which is revealed to have been from his mother, informing him that Daryl was shot while working his new job. While Hondo rejects that the call affected his judgement, the rest of the team relentlessly defend their actions and his strategy. The rest of the team are later cleared, except for Hondo and Street. Deacon and the rest of the team return to the crime scene and discover hidden cameras in smoke detectors thanks to a tip from one of the residents. Meanwhile, Cortez learns that she could be bound for a promotion, but her past relationship with Hondo makes Hicks consider it carefully before he decides to look the other way.
44	22	"Trigger Creep"	Oz Scott	Sarah Alderson & Munis Rashid	May 9, 2019	222	5.02
Hondo searches for the person responsible for a near-fatal attempt on Daryl's life. He works with a reluctant detective and learns from a homeless man that Daryl was arguing with another kid, who is revealed to be his boss' nephew, who has found himself in similar circumstances to Daryl. The SWAT team tries to figure out the next location where a lone gunman whose daughter died will strike. They learn that he was struggling in his personal life with both losing his job, daughter, his house and income, and that he is targeting those he holds accountable for his demise. Meanwhile, FBI agent Elle Benson approaches Cortez with another undercover assignment. Hicks advises her not to take the assignment as it is a front in order to win her over to the bureau.
45	23	"Kangaroo"	Billy Gierhart	Aaron Rahsaan Thomas & Michael Gemballa	May 16, 2019	223	5.75
The S.W.A.T team once again squares off against The Emancipators when they hold a live-stream kangaroo court to publicly execute city politicians. Their first victim is a councilman who was hanged over a bridge, while another councilman is handed over to a local gang who was affected by policies he supported. They next determine that the group is utilising a truck and determine the last location where the city controller is meant to be executed. After saving her, they corner the leader and apprehend him. Lastly the team evacuate and save people from the city hall, where The Emancipators have planted bombs. Meanwhile, Deacon receives an LAPD Police Star, an honor he feels he does not deserve. Ultimately in his acceptance speech, he dedicates the star for him and the team. Hondo helps Daryl with his recovery. Street finds his mother under the influence of drugs again, leading him to call in her parole officer to send her back to prison. Note: This episode marks the final appearance of Stephanie Sigman (Captain Jessica Cortez)

=== Season 3 (2019–20) ===
No. overall	No. in season	Title	Directed by	Written by	Original release date	Prod. code	U.S. viewers (millions)
46	1	"Fire in the Sky"	Billy Gierhart	Michael Jones-Morales	October 2, 2019	301	4.03
The 20-David squad welcomes Lt. Piper Lynch from LAPD Hollywood Division as they race to stop a serial bomber using drones as a detonation device. Learning that their culprit is a former army veteran and that he was radicalised after being deployed in Yemen, they gradually deduce that he is targeting people involved with drone manufacturing and piloting, which leads them to a former high ranking official in charge of drone operations in the Middle East. Meanwhile, Hondo's guardianship of Darryl becomes complicated when his father unexpectedly moves in. Also, Street helps Molly and a client of hers in a domestic violence dispute. Note: This episode marks the debut regular appearance of Amy Farrington (Piper Lynch).
47	2	"Bad Faith"	Marc Roskin	Kent Rotherham	October 9, 2019	302	3.73
The S.W.A.T team goes on a hunt for the unstable and dangerous fugitive wife of a former infamous leader of a doomsday cult. Hondo reaches out to a former victim of the cult whom he helped into recovery, who sketches out that the wife wants to complete a 36 member "convoy" ritual, which in reality would serve as an execution. Meanwhile, Hicks and Hondo learn that the mayor has appointed Lynch as a consultant to SWAT in order to help them improve and be assigned more responsibility. Also, Luca reveals his latest passion project: a Guatemalan food truck and he asks the team to help invest in it. However, none of them do due to worrying about personal economic issues, but Hondo does invest in order to get him started.
48	3	"Funny Money"	Alrick Riley	Alison Cross	October 16, 2019	303	3.56
Lynch forces the team to go undercover for a local gang printing counterfeit money. Street and Chris go in undercover to get to Corbett, the man printing the money. Over time they gain his trust, but also challenge some of his business approaches before they arrest him when their delivery is ready. Corbett agrees to help the police and joins Street to meet the gang leaders. Meanwhile, Hondo struggles with his family, especially trying to get his parents to move past their grudges. Also, Molly Hicks asks Chris if Street is seeing anyone.
49	4	"Immunity"	Jann Turner	Michael Gemballa	October 23, 2019	304	3.76
The S.W.A.T team tries to apprehend a former Colombian rebel leader turned drug smuggler, but is forced to let him go, due to CIA immunity. When Deacon's family gets caught in the crosshairs, he is forced to put his family under S.W.A.T protection after the drug leader retaliates by attacking Deacon at his home. Meanwhile, Hondo receives troubling news about his father's health from Daryl and attempts to convince him to see a doctor, which he at first refuses, and Hondo resorts to expressing care for him despite their differences. Also, Tan must face the Professional Standards Bureau after he unknowingly consumed Pot Gummies his girlfriend, Bonnie, left out.
50	5	"The LBC"	Lin Oeding	Aaron Rahsaan Thomas	October 30, 2019	305	3.43
A joint investigation between LAPD S.W.A.T and Long Beach Police Department on the stolen LAPD weapons reunites Street with his foster brother, Nate. Street struggles to reconnect with Nate after asking him for a favour with info into the Jamaican gang that stole the weapons, Chaos Posse. However their relationship begins to improve as Street apologizes and decides to spend more time with Nate in order to reconnect. Meanwhile, Hondo discovers his father has lung cancer, which further concerns him about his father's stubborn act. Also, the team decides to help out Luca's food truck business.
51	6	"Kingdom"	David Rodriguez	Sarah Alderson	November 6, 2019	306	3.84
The S.W.A.T team races to save a Middle Eastern activist who was abducted under pretense of treason. However they soon learn that he aided the activist in staging her kidnapping in order to call attention to the human rights abuses in her native country. The abductors are later identified as having worked for the activist's uncle with the intention of sending her to their country to be punished for her activism. Meanwhile, Hondo finds himself in a tense family reunion, as his older sister Winnie arrives in Los Angeles to visit their hospitalized father after 30 years of estrangement and finds herself unaccepting of their father's apology. Also, Luca's food truck business hits a roadblock when he purchases an impounded truck used as a meth lab. Street worries his relationship with Hicks' daughter Molly will negatively affect his career.
52	7	"Track"	Batán Silva	Robert Wittstadt	November 13, 2019	307	3.09
The S.W.A.T. team tracks down a four-man robbery crew who is using a thermal lance as a tool for a heist. Rocker learns that a retired SWAT mechanic, Wally, was sent to spy on them and fed information to the robbery crew about their intel and plans. Wally's intel however helps them determine the crew's next target: the Los Angeles Raceway. Meanwhile, Chris confronts an imbalance in her relationship with Kira and Ty. Also, Street debates whether he should tell Hicks he's dating Molly. Hondo gets to know Nichelle, a woman who helped him with an injured delivery driver struck by the robbery crew, who runs a community centre in his childhood neighbourhood. Note: This episode marks the debut appearance of Rochelle Aytes (Nichelle Carmichael).
53	8	"Lion's Den"	Billy Gierhart	Munis Rashid	November 20, 2019	308	3.76
An eviction notice delivered by two LA County Sheriff deputies turns into a dramatic standoff between law enforcement and the Fuentes family. As negotiations to get the injured deputy to safety prolongs into the night, Hicks offers to trade himself for the wounded deputy who was taken hostage by the Fuentes'. Meanwhile, Chris considers breaking up with Kira and Ty after feeling more distant from them. Also, Hondo reflects on his personal life choices as he helps his father through a medical crisis.
54	9	"Sea Legs"	Greg Beeman	Craig Gore	November 27, 2019	309	5.23
The S.W.A.T. team joins forces with the Los Angeles Organized Crime division to rescue an undercover officer whose cover is blown while investigating a human trafficking ring. The investigation leads them to a barber shop that acts as a front for the trafficking ring, and they rescue several girls along the way. Meanwhile, Street seeks to help his foster brother Nate when he comes to him asking for help when faced with heroin smuggling under his boss.
55	10	"Monster"	Guy Ferland	A.C. Allen	December 11, 2019	310	4.81
The S.W.A.T. team is assigned with securing a former Somali warlord Aden Syed, who is wanted for war crimes to be escorted to the International Crime Court. Having lived peacefully in the US under a new identity for 20 years, his wife and son believe him to be innocent until proven guilty. The case is complicated when Somali assassins attempt to kill him and the ICC works with SWAT to bring Syed to a safe house. When his wife and son is captured by the assassins, they demand him to confess to the war crimes. However, having trained them, Syed knows they would kill them regardless if he confesses. SWAT are thereby forced to save his wife and son without the confession, which they narrowly manage before the assassins plan them to be killed. The ICC takes Syed on to The Hague to face his charges. Street seeks to help his foster brother Nate when he comes to him asking for help when faced with heroin smuggling under his boss. When they speak to Nate's supervisor, two armed robbers come to take the heroin, but Street shoots them both, stunning everyone.
56	11	"Bad Cop"	Ben Hernandez Bray	Andrew Dettmann	January 15, 2020	311	3.66
Street is torn between his commitment to SWAT and to his foster brother Nate when the latter is unexpectedly ensnared in a drug ring. The SWAT team tracks down a ruthless crew that uses deadly force while stealing from card casinos. However, when they track and locate the crew, they soon learn that another crew has struck another card casino, replicating the same memo as the one they arrested. Meanwhile, Buck approaches Deacon to partner on a private security opportunity. Deacon contemplates the offer, worried it might just be to exploit his status with a police star, but ultimately decides on accepting the offer. Also, Street delivers Nate's boss, Teague Nolan, to a meeting in a junkyard. Once he returns to a motel, it's revealed that his "quitting" SWAT was a part of an undercover assignment by Hicks and Hondo in order to infiltrate Nolan's drug ring.
57	12	"Good Cop"	Guy Ferland	Matthew T. Brown	January 22, 2020	312	3.39
After the revelation of Street "quitting" SWAT was a ploy for him to infiltrate Nolan's drug ring, the SWAT team goes all out to help him bust Nolan and his supplier. The case takes a tragic turn and becomes personal for Street when Nate is murdered by Nolan.
58	13	"Ekitai Rashku"	Billy Gierhart	Craig Gore	January 29, 2020	313	4.45
Hondo, Deacon, Tan and Hicks travel to Tokyo to extradite fugitive Koji Kumura of the Nazawa clan to the Tokyo Metropolitan Police Department, but soon become engaged in a manhunt when Kumura escapes from custody. They soon learn that Kumura is planning on seeking revenge against his now former boss Nazawa, but he seems to easily slip away from them. The rest of the SWAT team search for any contacts the criminal cultivated while hiding out in Los Angeles. Meanwhile, Street continues to reel from his brother's death. Luca returns with good news. Note: This episode in addition to being filmed in Los Angeles, California was also filmed on location in Tokyo, Japan.
59	14	"Animus"	Hannelle M. Culpepper	Michael Jones-Morales & Sarah Alderson	March 4, 2020	314	3.47
The SWAT team searches for a lone gunman who has been targeting a law firm and a sorority house, before they eventually realise that the gunman is targeting women. Furthermore, their assailant has been a part of a website where toxic discussions against women have taken place, and that he acted on other people's fantasies. Meanwhile, Luca assists with a homicide investigation in his neighborhood, which local gang leader Marcos suspect came from a rival gang. However, as Luca looks into the victim's love life, he quickly leaned that his girlfriend's ex wanted to eliminate the competition, and had no gang affiliation at all. Also, Hondo reaches a juncture in his relationship with Nichelle. He is also briefly reunited with Nia when investigating the gunman case.
60	15	"Knockout"	Billy Gierhart	A.C. Allen & Kent Rotherham	March 11, 2020	315	4.19
Deacon's side job as private security at a high-profile boxing match between LA native Marlon Maxwell and Cuban boxer Gio Torres, leads to the kidnapping of Torres' pregnant wife Esther. The kidnappers' only demand is for Torres to lose. The SWAT team are brought in to assist and they learn that big foreign bookmakers have placed high bets on Maxwell winning. Meanwhile, Darryl juggles with seeking to see his newborn son who his ex-girlfriend has moved to San Diego. Also, Tan attempts to stand up to his mother's favoritism of his brother when planning on introducing Bonnie to her.
61	16	"Gunpowder Treason"	Paul Bernard	Amelia Sims	March 18, 2020	316	4.01
Hondo and girlfriend Nichelle disagree over guest speaker at her community center, a former rapper with gang ties, which Hondo disapproves of. Ultimately he finds himself giving the rapper a benefit of the doubt after Chris gives him some advice. When a teen is abducted, SWAT's search leads them to Joel Powell, who is in witness protection after he is allegedly behind the abduction of hedge fund son Zane Coleman. They later discover that Zane is Joel's biological son who was separated from him after his wife refused to enter witness protection. Meanwhile, Luca worries about his future in SWAT if he doesn't pass the fitness test. Also, Hicks reconnects with his estranged son JP after the two clash over how to best help JP's neighbour who has been living in her car until it was impounded.
62	17	"Hotel L.A."	Laura Belsey	Alison Cross	March 25, 2020	317	3.82
SWAT work with the LAPD Gang Unit to take on a group of gangs who have gathered at the Hotel LA to discuss a new way to smuggle products. The operation becomes complicated when an off-duty Salt Lake Sheriff's deputy arrives to retrieve his long lost daughter, which ends in a shootout. Word of SWAT interfering to help spreads and the gangs rally to escape the hotel. The team finds themselves navigating the hotel in order to apprehend them all before any of them can escape. During the case, Luca's brother Terry, a freelance stringer reporter, crosses police lines to shoot footage of the event which complicates the team's rescue mission. Meanwhile, Deacon worries about Buck after he becomes more withdrawn with their security gig.
63	18	"Stigma"	Billy Gierhart	Ryan Keleher	April 8, 2020	318	3.85
Hondo and the 20-David squad race to locate their former team leader, Buck Spivey when the latter goes AWOL and they fear he may have become suicidal. Concurrently they handle a hostage situation in a deli, where one of the hostage takers manages to get away. In the pursuit of apprehending him, they stumble upon a gruesome scene of a murdered mother and her infant child. The team go through counselling, sharing the pain of the day they have gone through. Note: This episode that Shemar Moore (Daniel Harrelson), Alex Russell (Jim Street), Lina Esco (Christina Alonso), Kenny Johnson (Dominique Luca), David Lim (Victor Tan) and Jay Harrington (David Kay) appeared in an online public service announcement in conjunction with the National Suicide Prevention Lifeline.
64	19	"Vice"	Oz Scott	Michael Gemballa & Matthew T. Brown	April 22, 2020	319	4.76
Tan finds himself being targeted by Conor Pope, a meth dealer whom Tan put away 7 years ago during his time on LAPD Vice squad. Together with the team, they learn that Pope sought to seek revenge on those who put him behind bars and rallied his old crew to break him out of prison. Meanwhile, Chris finds herself arresting deputy mayor Logan Carter's son Jacob for drunk driving, but later learns his processing was dismissed. Conflicted about if she should take on the political elite, Hondo encourages her to do what she deems is right to do. Also, Hondo is reunited with his sister Winnie again, who gets to meet Nichelle. Tan also proposes to Bonnie, which she accepts.
65	20	"Wild Ones"	Cherie Dvorak	Andrew Dettmann	April 29, 2020	320	5.03
The SWAT team pursue Beau Walker and his girlfriend Harper, a "Bonnie & Clyde"-like couple who are on the run and seeking a set of rare 10th century chess pieces worth millions, which becomes complicated when bounty hunters get involved as well. When Beau and Harper injure one of the bounty hunters during pursuit, Deacon offers them to join in on the takedown after they retrieve the chess pieces from its new owner. Meanwhile, Darryl is surprised when his ex-girlfriend visits with his young son. Also, Luca confronts his fear as he prepares for the final PFQ test while helping his mentee, Kelly. Chris receives help from Lynch in dealing with deputy mayor Carter and his son, which inadvertently leads to Carter resigning in order to tackle his son's issues.
66	21	"Diablo"	Doug Aarniokoski	Munis Rashid & Robert Wittstadt	May 20, 2020	321	4.82
SWAT hunts down members of the El Septimbo gang who crash a plane in the suburbs of LA after a joint operation with the DEA goes awry. They quickly learn that the gang's leader, dubbed El Diablo, was on the plane and is now on the loose in the city. Meanwhile, Hondo tries to make amends with Nichelle, but later learns that she has moved on, but hopes that he will change into the person he thrives to be. Deacon hesitates when asked to speak to a group of recruits about mental health. Note: This episode serves as a de facto season 3 finale due to COVID-19 pandemic. It also marks the final regular appearance of Amy Farrington (Piper Lynch).

=== Season 4 (2020–21) ===
No. overall	No. in season	Title	Directed by	Written by	Original release date	Prod. code	U.S. viewers (millions)
67	1	"3 Seventeen Year Olds"	Billy Gierhart	Aaron Rahsaan Thomas	November 11, 2020	401	2.75
As the COVID-19 pandemic begins to take hold in Los Angeles, the SWAT team continues the pursuit of remaining parts of El Diablo's drug cartel scattered throughout the city, which eventually leads them to hunting down a Jihadist group detonating bombs in coordinated attacks. Online chatrooms reveal that they worked with an American, who is targeting an event, which notably Darryl is attending. Meanwhile, Hondo, his father, Daniel Sr. and Darryl confront the history of racial tension in Los Angeles between law enforcement and the Black community, through flashbacks to the 1992 Los Angeles riots following the Rodney King verdict. Two months later, all three of them march along with protesters in the wake of the murder of George Floyd and pay their respects to past victims of police brutality.
68	2	"Stakeout"	Billy Gierhart	Kent Rotherham	November 11, 2020	402	2.56
The SWAT team acts as a domestic surveillance unit for the CIA to confirm whether international crime lord Salman Radek has resurfaced in Los Angeles after being off the grid for years. While taking out Radek's alleged residence, Street becomes personally engaged to save a boy who shows signs of abuse, which ultimately leads to Hondo removing him from surveillance duties. Meanwhile, Tan searches for a person responsible for a racial altercation with his mother.
69	3	"The Black Hand Man"	Doug Aarniokoski	Aaron Rahsaan Thomas & Matthew T. Brown	November 18, 2020	403	2.25
SWAT works to find an FBI informant on the run from the Venuti crime family he is testifying against. They learn that his brother has been recruited by the family and had been tasked to kill the informant, but refused. Meanwhile, the dynamic between Chris, Street and Tan gets tense when it's revealed they're all competing for a liaison position at a leadership conference. Chris finds comfort and determination with the newly recruited SWAT member Erika, who she met while she was in the SWAT academy. Also, Hondo is asked to speak at the parole hearing of Leroy, leading to Hondo having to think about the right decision for him and Darryl.
70	4	"Memento Mori"	Doug Aarniokoski	VJ Boyd	November 25, 2020	404	3.39
SWAT works to find the person threatening to attack the memorial of Rhodium, a singer who spoke out against police brutality. Her mother, Jillian, has reservations about Deacon being assigned to the memorial detail due to his side gig rejecting a request for security due to Rhodium's views. Ultimately Hicks convinces her to retain him. Meanwhile, Leroy is released from prison and Hondo struggles to keep Darryl from falling back into old habits without separating him from his father. Also, Street decides to ease down on the competitiveness for the liaison position in respect for Chris, but Tan doesn't relent despite his concerns.
71	5	"Fracture"	Oz Scott	Munis Rashid	December 9, 2020	405	3.88
The team works to find a bomber who is targeting victims who have no apparent connection with each other, the first being a store and the other a law firm. Tan becomes visibly affected when it's shown that the bomber is suffering from schizophrenia, an illness his father went through. Meanwhile, Hondo is also asked by Lynch to be the face of a campaign to reach out to the black communities in an attempt for recruiting, but Hondo rejects this idea. Also, Chris, Street and Tan compete for the title of "Master Gunner" with fellow SWAT officers, with Street beating Chris by less than two-tenths of a second.
72	6	"Hopeless Sinner"	Cherie Dvorak	Alison Cross	December 16, 2020	406	4.06
Chris brings the team into her personal mission to save a teenage girl from a predatory religious leader. The fight to retrieve enough evidence to go against the leader and his church is difficult, but a recording Chris makes sets the grounds for more firm action. However, in the midst of it, the girl's boyfriend is abducted and later killed. Meanwhile, Hondo learns that the gang unit has re-opened a file on Darryl due to him frequenting his father who is on parole. With advice from Hicks, he attempts to convince Leroy to be more cautious, but he dismisses his concerns in favour of Darryl despite the risk. Also, Tan's wedding planning goes awry when the hotel he and Bonnie booked can't reschedule and cancels their plans altogether.
73	7	"Under Fire"	Jann Turner	Andrew Dettman	January 13, 2021	407	3.28
A sniper targets members of Station 127 of the Los Angeles Fire Department. The team discovers that the suspect lost his wife and infant child in a fire two years prior and he sued the department but lost the case. Meanwhile, the rivalry between Chris, Street and Tan ratchets up, but the latter resigns from the competition after a stunt at the fire station. Also, Street and Molly's relationship is strained by his complicated history with his imprisoned mother, who Molly learns is sick and might require urgent surgery on her liver.
74	8	"Crusade"	Billy Gierhart	Sarah Alderson	January 27, 2021	408	3.08
The team searches for a group of white supremacists carrying out coordinated attacks against minority owned local businesses. Coordination with the FBI confirms that they're up against the Imperial Dukes, who have many local cells operating around the country. During the raid, Tan is wounded and Erika, who stepped in temporarily with the team, dies from her wounds, devastating Chris. Meanwhile, Deacon and his wife find themselves at odds when she wants to enroll their daughter in private school which he has difficulty accepting.
75	9	"Next of Kin"	Cherie Dvorak	Michael Gemballa	February 17, 2021	409	2.99
The aftermath of Erika's death has different affects on the team. Chris seeks comfort from Luca, while also refusing to move Erika's belongings from their shared apartment. The FID launch an investigation while Hondo and Deacon re-examine the scene, noticing a training field likely built by a former marine. The team follow the lead and thwart the man's escape, but are unsuccessful in interrogating him. Tan becomes too tough on SWAT trainees, while Annie suggests Deacon should retire. Hondo questions his future in policing, but stands up to the mayor when Hicks offers to resign to take political responsibility for the raid. Luca's encouragement later convinces Chris to finally clear out Erika's belongings. Hondo finds comfort in Nichelle and opens up to her about his daunting thoughts of his future.
76	10	"Buried"	Paul Bernard	Robert Wittstadt	March 3, 2021	410	3.62
The team scramble to save the life of Jess Winter who was abducted by a sketchy coworker, Joe Falcone. Her husband Phil attempts to figure out her location himself but ends up arrested on prior suspicions. Clues from Jess' place of work and colleagues point them on the direction of Falcone, who has priors for stalking in Miami. SWAT medic Nora Fowler joins Hondo's team, but finds herself put on the sideline more often than she would have preferred. Meanwhile, Molly notices that Street is being very distant and seeks advice from her father. Later, Street breaks up with her after acknowledging his feelings for Chris, but doesn't disclose this to Molly.
77	11	"Positive Thinking"	Guy Ferland	VJ Boyd & Sarah Alderson	March 10, 2021	411	2.84
Mumford makes a return to help the team investigate a case that holds a personal meaning to him. The case involves continued fentanyl supply by the Echo Park Six led by Trey Mitchell, whose drugs notably killed his goddaughter Tonya. Hicks is weary of Mumford when he fears he becomes to eager to catch Mitchell without enough evidence. Meanwhile, Chris seeks help from Tan in order to get over Erika's death which he later proposes as boxing, but Chris secretly returns to drinking. Also, Hondo is skeptical of Darryl and Leroy's joint business proposal which Nichelle is considering funding for.
78	12	"U-Turn"	Larry Teng	Niceole R. Levy	March 24, 2021	412	3.71
A high-stakes domestic disturbance involving a father and his two young daughters is revealed to be linked to a hit on a group of Guatemalan human rights activists who have run into hiding. With Luca back from Germany but limited to paper work, the team sets out to save the activists before the remaining hitmen can get to them. The murder of a reporter who wanted to help the activists reveals clues to human rights violations in Guatemala and an active duty to suppress the group's activism. Meanwhile, Hondo learns from Darryl and Winnie that his father has been distant lately, which he comes to learn is because he fears what his new test results for possible cancer could be. Also, Street comes clean about his breakup with Molly to Hicks and later reaches out to check in his hospitalised mother after helping the daughters from the domestic disturbance.
79	13	"Sins of the Fathers"	Guy Ferland	Munis Rashid & Alison Cross	April 7, 2021	413	3.10
The team works together with the FBI to hunt down a deadly band of mercenaries hired by wealthy CEO Jon Afton trying to leave the country before he's arrested for running a massive Ponzi scheme. Afton however makes an unexpected change by picking up his son Jonah, albeit the mercenaries do so by force when an officer attempts to intervene. Meanwhile, Hondo is forced to confront his changing relationship with Darryl. Street helps a hungover Chris who later seeks grief counselling at a community centre. Deacon is disappointed when he is rejected from attending his son Matthew's demonstration event.
80	14	"Reckoning"	Maja Vrvilo	Amelia Sims	April 21, 2021	414	3.06
The team are forced to confront the Imperial Dukes again when the wife of a new recruit is hospitalised after a domestic disturbance. With information from her and a team-up with the FBI, they embark on a mission to stop the group from planning a larger attack on the city. After raiding a warehouse, Fowler identifies a poisonous and airborne poison that the group has taken to use for the attack. Meanwhile, Hondo and Leroy disagree on how to handle a challenge to Darryl's fledgling business and when Hondo's solution hits a road block, he fears Leroy's solution might only be short term for Darryl and his business. Also, Deacon suspects that new officer Lee Durham is a white supremacist, but is unsure on how to prove it.
81	15	"Local Heroes"	Jann Turner	Matthew T. Brown	May 5, 2021	415	3.11
The team tries to track down a media-savvy crew of bank robbers who consider themselves a band of modern-day Robin Hoods. Luca looks to his brother Terry for help identifying the stringer who filmed the robbers. He later takes the time to catch up with Terry, opening up about not being able to choose his job after initially joining the police. Meanwhile, Deacon is conflicted in approaching Durham and two other cops' racism, while Hondo urges him to report it. Initially Deacon holds off, but after receiving encouragement from Annie and accepting Hondo's suggestion of recordings, he reports Durham and the two others.
82	16	"Lockdown"	Maja Vrvilo	Kent Rotherham & Robert Wittstadt	May 12, 2021	416	2.96
Members of the Los Mags escape from custody at a courthouse, taking everyone inside as hostages with both Hondo and Deacon inside. With them trapped, Luca becomes team leader for the mission, but he's a bit unsure if he can rise to the challenge. However, Fowler offers him some advice in how to take on the challenge. Meanwhile, Street visits his mother at the hospital and learns she is dying and could require a partial liver transplant if she could continue living. The decision makes him unsure of what to do, but Chris warns against it, arguing that it would reduce his mobility and at worst risk his career. Chris talks with Street's mother in the hospital to warn against this, making Street's mom realize how much Chris loves Street.
83	17	"Whistleblower"	Cherie Dvorak	Ryan Keleher	May 19, 2021	417	3.13
The team races to rescue victims of a sex trafficking ring that is preying on disenfranchised women while working with Lynch, who now heads a task force. The case becomes personal for Tan, whose high school crush disappeared and suffered through prostitution before managing to escape. Meanwhile, Hondo finds himself at odds with Leroy and Darryl over the future of their business, with them deciding to return Hondo's money for the business. He later learns how much personal effort Leroy put into helping Darryl, renewing his respect for him. Also, Street confronts Chris about meeting with his hospitalized mom and learns that he is a donor match, and decides to help his mother, despite Chris' continued opposition. Deacon faces the ramifications of the Durham report, who is reassigned. Hondo decides to go to the media with the racism, to which Hicks warns that it could cost him his job.
84	18	"Veritas Vincit"	Billy Gierhart	Niceole R. Levy & Michael Gemballa	May 26, 2021	418	3.17
Hondo's revelations to the press pushes the limits in tensions between the Black community and the LAPD, which leads many to fear all out war conditions. This only exacerbates when the 27th Precient is bombed, in which activist Kevin Hilliard is framed for. The team learns that the Imperial Dukes had aimed to frame him and subsequently start a race war and conflict between Black people and the police. Meanwhile, Darryl encourages Leroy to help the community, to which Leroy helps hold the Hammers at bay from escalating the confrontation with police. Tan and Bonnie plan on marrying in a small ceremony at the courthouse. Street and Chris confess their feelings for each other and share a kiss. Hicks informs Hondo that he will be demoted from his position, which the latter realises repeats history from when he first took over as team leader.

=== Season 5 (2021–22) ===
No. overall	No. in season	Title	Directed by	Written by	Original release date	Prod. code	U.S. viewers (millions)
85	1	"Vagabundo"	Billy Gierhart	Mellori Velasquez	October 1, 2021	501	4.86
Hondo retreats to a Mexican village after speaking out against racism to the media, choosing to reevaluate his life. However, a local dispute between the neighbouring Reyes family and property owner Arthur Novak has him gradually joining the Reyes in seeking justice and figure out the truth of what happened to the father. Despite his small efforts, he doesn't seek to get more involved until he gets in trouble with the local police after a brawl with AJ Novak, Arthur's son, and he is forced to give the Reyes a larger offer on Arthur's behalf. Note: This episode and "Madrugada" were both filmed on location in Mexico.
86	2	"Madrugada"	Billy Gierhart	Matthew T. Brown	October 8, 2021	502	4.94
In Mexico, Hondo and local cop Charro set on rescuing Delfina Reyes from Arthur Novak's captivity, but her ex-boyfriend Gabriel disrupts their plans when he tries to rescue her himself. In the process, AJ Novak kills him and attempts to recapture Delfina, but Hondo kills him by shooting AJ in the back. He negotiates a transfer between the Reyes and Novak, but makes it a trap, ensuring a firefight between him, Charro and Novak's mercenaries. Back in Los Angeles, 20 Squad live in uncertainty until Hicks disbands the team and plans to distribute them over other teams. The team embark on one last mission to save some teenagers held hostage by armed drug dealers in an abandoned mall. Hicks offers Luca Jessica's old job, but he turns it down. Meanwhile, Street and Chris attempt to find a common approach for their newfound relationship, and Hondo returns home, to the team's delight.
87	3	"27 David"	Alex Graves	Nathan Louis Jackson	October 15, 2021	503	4.84
Following Hondo's return from Mexico, the team learns that the department is reinstating 20 squad. But Hicks lets them know that neither Hondo nor Deacon are going to be team leader, and instead instating Rodrigo Sanchez, an old friend of Deacon and Hondo. The team takes time to adapt to their new situation as they go after a robbery crew that stole blueprints from a warehouse, which they learn details an old building that now houses the DEA's evidence storage, to which they plan on stealing money from. Luca is suspicious of Sanchez's return and suspects he has a secret agenda, which Deacon and Hondo dismiss at first. Luca reaches out to a police commission staffer, who reveals that they planned to use Sanchez to force Hondo out of SWAT.
88	4	"Sentinel"	Cherie Dvorak	Ryan Keleher	October 22, 2021	504	4.70
Civilians utilizing the Sentinel watch app break in to tackle the Hernandez brothers who have conducted a robbery. The team face continuous challenges with civilians resorting to vigilantism to catch the brothers, who are revealed to be stealing insulin to treat the daughter of one of the perpetrators. Sanchez and Hondo clash, causing Hondo to be accused of insubordination. Meanwhile, Chris and Deacon work to ensure fair qualifications for SWAT cadets after Chris learns about an unfair advantage for female cadets from Fowler.
89	5	"West Coast Offense"	Stephanie Marquardt	Kent Rotherham	November 5, 2021	505	4.93
20 Squad responds to a home invasion call at the home of pro football quarterback Derrick Nichols, and soon learn that it was staged and a part of a murderous plot against him. They learn from Nichols' manager that he had beef with an old friend, who denies the allegations, but points them to a chatroom filled with people who dislike Nichols. Hondo finds himself in hot water with Sanchez over a minor insubordination issue. Deacon, Hondo and Luca later inform the rest of the team about Sanchez' true agenda. Meanwhile, Hicks receives a new lead in a 20-year-old Jane Doe case with a distant cousin being identified.
90	6	"Crisis Actor"	Cherie Dvorak	Sarah Alderson	November 12, 2021	506	4.84
When armed gunmen invade the set of a controversial cable news known for promoting conspiracy theories, 20 Squad race to stop an unfolding hostage situation from escalating any further. Meanwhile, Street prepares to say goodbye to his mother with help from Chris. Also, Deacon and Luca try to sway Sanchez into quitting to save Hondo's career, after learning that he lied about saving the mayor from a bomb letter. Though their initial offer is unsuccessful, Deacon's second offer ticks Sanchez' interest and he ultimately steps aside as team leader, thereby paving the way for Hondo to be reinstated.
91	7	"Keep the Faith"	John Showalter	J. Stone Alston	December 3, 2021	507	5.33
With Hondo back as team leader, 20 Squad race to find two teenagers who escaped with $2 million from a money laundering shop owned by the Russian mafia. A friend of Hondo's father puts him contact with a local shelter who helped the third teenager involved in the robbery. The two others attempt to find shelter at a homeless camp, but escape again after Hondo and Luca fend off the Russian mafia. Meanwhile, Tan handles a dire mood change with Bonnie after they meet their new neighbour who also speaks Cantonese. Also, Hondo's father reveals why he left the Black Panthers when he was younger, citing internal division and conflicts but has no regrets leaving despite some uncertainty.
92	8	"Safe House"	Alex Russell	Mellori Velasquez	December 10, 2021	508	4.98
Jenni, a woman from a safe house in Luca's neighbourhood for undocumented women, is abducted and the kidnappers, the RC, demands to know the location of stolen drugs she stole from her former boss. 20 Squad find themselves forming an alliance with Marcos Guzman in an attempt to find Jenni and bring her back to the safe house. But when Marcos takes the matter into his own hands on behalf of the safe house owner Mama Pina, the team is forced to push through an undercover deal where Chris joins in on meeting the RC in handing over their drugs. Meanwhile, Nichelle reveals to Hondo that she had applied to adopt a child three years ago and has recently received an offer from her adoption agency. After some consideration and consultation with his mother, Hondo accepts the prospect of raising a child together with her.
93	9	"Survive"	Billy Gierhart	Michael Gemballa	January 2, 2022	509	3.77
Chris volunteers to help Deacon with a private security gig protecting wealthy VIP Miguel Velez to Las Vegas. But after an ambush and hiding out in a ghost town, they learn that he was the former accountant for the Corrido drug cartel, stole information from them and is headed to Vegas to be reunited with his family and give the info to authorities. The cartel deploys reinforcements led by their enforcer Rafa. The rest of the team scramble to narrow down their location from LA. Meanwhile, Chris decides to help Mama Pina's safe house, an idea which Deacon later comes to accept after the gig is completed.
94	10	"Three Guns"	Guy Ferland	Melissa Park	January 9, 2022	510	3.73
20 Squad partner with the DEA to retrieve stolen rocket launchers that were smuggled into Los Angeles by the Corrido cartel, only for issues to rise as the Israeli producer sends enforcers to reclaim the weapons. But with remnants of the weapons taken by an American part of a terrorist organisation, the team race to stop him and his accomplices in shooting down a commercial airliner. Meanwhile, Hondo considers a new policing initiative following a confrontation between Leroy, a homeless man, and patrol officers. Also, Luca suspects his mentee's mother is looking for an opportunity to ask him out on a date.
95	11	"Old School Cool"	Paul Bernard	Amelia Sims	February 27, 2022	511	3.83
After a Gang-Narcotics raid goes awry, the police learn that their servers have been hacked and the information leaked to notorious criminals who will seek to eliminate undercover officers. 20 Squadis forced to work without their digital equipment in order to protect the now compromised officers and fend off the criminals. Meanwhile, Deacon handles the aftermath of a cadet hazing, and Chris gets the female cadet, Alexis Cabrera, to open up more and gives her encouragement. Also, Deacon tackles an unusual quest from a prisoner at a prison he gives Bible lessons to. The prisoner, Eduardo Ortiz, claims his innocence. Deacon learns that there is not much he can do other than consider the possibilities for and against Ortiz' innocence.
96	12	"Provenance"	Billy Gierhart	Imogen Browder	March 6, 2022	512	4.00
A downtown auction house is invaded by an armed crew, where Hondo's sister Winnie is working. But with the auction house locked down to the teeth, the team need to improvise and utilise secret tunnels in order to enter the house. Hondo later transfers command to Deacon in order to negotiate with the crew leader. Meanwhile, Hondo's father takes advise from Hicks about being proud of his children's work and efforts, which he tells Hondo and Winnie during dinner. Chris encourages Luca to seek out the Arts Crime detective, who she noticed might have expressed an interest in him.
97	13	"Short Fuse"	Guy Ferland	Kent Rotherham	March 13, 2022	513	4.15
As Joey Baratta, a serial bomber who's terminally ill escapes from a hospital determined to settle any old scores before he dies, 20 Squad team up with Ray Kiminski, an ATF agent and a former academy roommate of Hicks'. The team later learns that Baratta isn't out for revenge, but actually working to eliminate old enemies of an imprisoned serial killer. Meanwhile, Chris assists an El Salvadorian girl in Mama Pina's care to combat a deportation to her home country. Also, Hondo and Nichelle prepare to welcome their adopted child, but she learns last minute that the birth mother wants to keep the child. The two later decide to have children of their own.
98	14	"Albatross"	John Terlesky	Michael Gemballa	March 20, 2022	514	3.94
When 20 Squad arrests a group of robbery suspects, Tan discovers his informant, Ally (who helped him during the Season 1 episode "Blindspots"), is among the group. Ally provides them with information that points them to an opioid ring, giving them the opportunity to take down the ringleader The King. However, in the attempt to retrieve more info from The King's middle man, Hondo calls Tan out for letting Ally get to his head. He, Tan and Ally go undercover to meet The King, but find themselves fighting out of setup and only narrowly capturing The King before he can escape. Meanwhile, Hicks is scheduled for his five year evaluation with Dr. Hughes, leaving Luca in charge as the commanding officer. At first he is hesitant to the responsibility, but Luca later gets used to it and makes the right calls despite some reservations. Also, Annie decides to help Deacon in attempting to seek an alibi for Eduardo Ortiz.
99	15	"Donor"	Lina Esco	Ryan Keleher	March 27, 2022	515	3.67
A gunman attacks a hospital, killing several members of its transplant board. 20 Squad discovers it's related to a grieving father, Fred Hill, who's out for revenge after his son Isaac was denied a kidney transplant. Meanwhile, Hondo begins searching stash houses for evidence linked to Saint, the friend of his father who he discovered was involved in drugs trafficking, but is unable to find anything that links Saint to them. Luca encourages Cabrera to perform during SWAT's talent show. Deacon and Annie have a disagreement over supporting each other after the latter misses Lila's pickup from school.
100	16	"The Fugitive"	Billy Gierhart	Matthew T. Brown	April 10, 2022	516	3.95
Hondo is forced to go on the run after deepfake video footage appears to see him shooting two fellow LAPD officers. Despite being advised against it, 20 Squad chooses to assist in clearing his name. With assistance from a friend of Street, the deepfake is swiftly debunked and Hondo is later cleared of all charges, but benched until further. He learns that Arthur Novak is one responsible for creating the deepfake, having escaped Mexico and seeking revenge for his son AJ's death, and that the officers are actually alive and being held hostage.
101	17	"Cry Foul"	Oz Scott	Amelia Sims	April 17, 2022	517	4.04
A series of deadly explosions strike oil derricks, and 20 Squad begin hunting down an activist turned terrorist. They learn that the activist's best friend had developed cancer when affected by the fumes stemming from the oil derricks and is aiming to raise awareness of the slow process of oil companies to reduce emissions. He aims to target another oil company, whose CEO is scheduled for a tour of a new derricks area. Meanwhile Deacon and Annie continue their investigation into Ortiz' innocence, and Annie begins to suspect the lover's ex-wife for the murder because she inadvertently revealed knowing where the victim was dumped. Note: This episode marks the debut appearance of Anna Enger Ritch as Zoe Powell.
102	18	"Family"	Alrick Riley	Mia Fichman	April 24, 2022	519	4.19
Hicks is reunited with old friend Martin Walker who works as a judge, but shortly afterwards, he is shot and dies in the parking lot. The team learns that he presided over the family court earlier in his career and that one of the children separated, Naomi Ashfield, is seeking revenge against those who wronged her and her sister Virginia. Furthermore, they learn that Virginia's foster father raped her when she was fifteen years old, resulting in Virginia getting pregnant and later giving up her daughter and moved into a new home. Meanwhile, Luca's brother Terry is arrested for breaking and entering his girlfriend's ex's house to retrieve her belongings. Also, Hondo suspects his Father fears moving into a new apartment, but learns that he seeks to move in with Hondo's mother again, having just tested the waters about the possibility.
103	19	"Incoming"	Oz Scott	Michael Gemballa & Matthew T. Brown	May 1, 2022	518	3.88
Street assists a US Marshal escorting former smuggler Peter Galloway from Miami back to Los Angeles, but midway through the flight, Galloway and a group of accomplices hijack the plane. The team learn that Galloway aims to be reunited with his wife, who is serving time in prison. The team practices relentlessly to form a strategy for infiltrating the plane but are forced to improvise directly after none of the practices give satisfactory results. Meanwhile, Luca learns that Fowler has reduced hearing stemming from her time in Afghanistan and worries that she can't make SWAT. Also, Hondo proposes that Nichelle move in with him, which she accepts. Later, she reveals that she has lower than expected chances to get pregnant, but Hondo assures her that they will still be family despite the setback.
104	20	"Quandary"	Stephanie Marquardt	Sarah Alderson	May 8, 2022	520	4.08
Two teens break into a house and use weapons against the police, but afterwards 20 Squad uncover stash of weapons belonging to an arms dealer. The dealer points them to Tom Byrd, who aims to target someone among the political elite whom he accuses for being corrupt. Meanwhile Chris, learns Mama Piña has been diagnosed with stage 4 cancer and is dying. She asks Chris to continue her work to help women at the shelter and Chris considers taking over it the day she dies. As a result she tells Hondo that she intends to quit SWAT in two weeks time. Luca also reveals to Street that he knew that he had feelings for Chris, and encourages him to pursue a relationship. Street asks Chris about their relationship, but becomes frustrated when Chris is still reluctant to guarantee anything.
105	21	"Zodiac"	Cherie Dvorak	Kent Rotherham & Mellori Velasquez	May 15, 2022	521	4.09
The Weaver family residence is raided by a group of men looking for Ming dynasty era Zodiac statues, but when they can't find them, they execute the entire family, save for the youngest daughter who went into hiding. The team learn the group are Bosnian ex-special forces working to return the lost statues to their rightful owners, but after multiple robberies, learn that the statues are all fake. Meanwhile, Luca asks Chris to come clean to Street about her feelings, but she remains adamant. Only after Street is shot does she come around to confessing her feelings, which Street later happily accepts. Also, Hondo allows Leroy to be an informant as a way to get to Hank St. John's drug operation after a close friend's daughter is hospitalised.
106	22	"Farewell"	Billy Gierhart	Andrew Dettmann & J. Stone Alston	May 22, 2022	522	3.36
British chemistry student Joseph Reid forces his fellow students to make a mixture for samon gas. 20 Squad suspects that he is retaliating his disciplinary action taken by his university, but soon learn that he and several accomplices are planning something bigger. They apprehend one of his accomplices before he can release nerve gas in a federal building, where they discover both he and Reid felt betrayed over loved ones left behind during the evacuation from Afghanistan and are seeking retribution. Meanwhile, Hondo secures Nichelle and a group of students she showed around. Chris and Street officially become a couple and the team marks her departure. Note: This episode marks the final appearance of Lina Esco (Christina Alonso).

=== Season 6 (2022–23) ===
No. overall	No. in season	Title	Directed by	Written by	Original release date	Prod. code	U.S. viewers (millions)
107	1	"Thai Hard"	Billy Gierhart	Sarah Alderson	October 7, 2022	601	4.76
While in Bangkok, Thailand training alongside the Thai SWAT team, Hondo finds himself receiving a call from his old friend, Joe, with the two discovering evidence of a drug smuggling operation on the border with Myanmar, which UN has long thought was squashed. Hondo and Joe are kidnapped by the drug kingpin, Zaw Min, who vows to kill them and attempts to have his nephew Thet shoot Hondo, but he is unable. Deacon and Tan with assistance from Thai SWAT race to find their missing colleagues. Back in Los Angeles, Hicks, Luca and the rest of the LAPD SWAT team search for a criminal who has ties to Zaw Min. Note: This is the first episode to have Rochelle Aytes (Nichelle Carmichael) credited as a series regular while the episode and "Thai Another Day" were filmed on location in Bangkok, Thailand.
108	2	"Thai Another Day"	Billy Gierhart	Kent Rotherham & Michael Gemballa	October 14, 2022	602	4.61
Having been rescued, Hondo reunites with Deacon and Tan as the three prepare to go after Zaw Min, the drug kingpin responsible for the abduction of Hondo and his friend, Joe, with the teams soon discovering the heroin operation has ties to Los Angeles. In Bangkok, the group separates in order to track to known associates of Zaw Min, which gradually leads them to a riverside quarter where his drug operation is going down. However, the case is jeopardized when the daughter of the Thai SWAT commander is kidnapped. In Los Angeles, Hicks, Luca, Street along with the LAPD SWAT teams race to find the Thai SWAT commander's missing daughter, abducted by Zaw Min's LA associate.
109	3	"Woah Black Betty"	Stephanie Marquardt	Brandon Margolis	October 21, 2022	603	4.44
Back in LA, Hondo and 20 Squad are caught by surprise when their armoured vehicle, Black Betty, is stolen when responding to a robbery. The team work with FBI agent Jackie Vasquez in their hunt for the robbers, but butt heads with her when she lets the robbers escape following a second robbery. Vasquez reveals that she has been investigating the robbers' connection to Gustaf Varner, a terrorist wanted for multiple bombings in Europe. Furthermore, it's determined that Black Betty would be utilised for another potential attack on American soil. Meanwhile, Hondo and Nichelle prepare for their gender reveal party, revealing that Nichelle is expecting a girl.
110	4	"Maniak"	Cherie Dvorak	Kent Rotherham	October 28, 2022	604	4.63
Convicted murderer Alexei Roman escapes from custody under the guise of leading the police to the remains of one of his victims. The team later learns that he is on the hunt for an imperial Russian cigar box which is meant to contain diamonds he owned. They also learn that a waiter at his former club, Amber Morgan, is his daughter and had pawned the box and attempted to retrieve the diamonds, only to find them gone. During the case, Street is reunited with a former LBPD colleague, Miguel Alfaro, who has transferred to LAPD SWAT. However, he still carries a grudge against Alfaro for anonymously reporting him for corruption during their LBPD years. Meanwhile, Hondo reunites with Nia and becomes hesitant about his approach in becoming a father, while Deacon gives him hope and encouragement for his newfound role.: This episode marks the debut appearance of Niko Pepaj as Miguel "Miko" Alfaro.
111	5	"Unraveling"	John Terlesky	Amelia Sims	November 4, 2022	605	5.09
During a flash mob robbery at a department store, the team discovers a woman, LaToya Turner, has been murdered, sending them on a race to find and stop the killers before they strike again. Deacon struggles with the fact a lone bullet from his gun might have killed Turner, but ballistics later disprove this. Instead, the team learns that Turner was hiding an escaped sweatshop worker whose brother was recently abducted by the same killers. Furthermore, a logo she recognises from the sweatshop leads them to the Tremblay clothing brand and the sweatshop leader, who is aiming to move the last workers out of LA. Meanwhile, Nichelle faces roadblocks in her new job with COPE under LAPD rule, but overcomes it with encouragement from Hondo.
112	6	"Checkmate"	Stephanie Marquardt	Brandon Sonnier & Alan Morgan	November 18, 2022	606	5.00
Detective Alexander Rios, who was working with Hondo on exposing Hank St. John "Saint" is kidnapped after a major raid against a Saint compound, discovering a hard-drive containing compromising evidence against Saint. The SWAT team races to find him before it's too late. Hondo also learns that Rios was kept in one of Raymont Harris' warehouses during his torture. Meanwhile, a sudden behavioural change in Hicks has Luca concerned, only to later find out that he is preparing for a date.
113	7	"Sequel"	Oz Scott	Sarah Alderson	December 2, 2022	607	4.83
The team finds themselves reunited with Rodrigo Sanchez when the actress he is working for, Serena Mendez, has her house broken into and she narrowly escapes death. They must work together to protect her against an Israeli mobster, who broke into her house to find his hidden money which was leftover from when he owned the house. Meanwhile, with his anniversary approaching, Tan tries to find Bonnie the perfect gift. Also, Luca learns that his mentee Kelly is moving to San Diego, which she is opposed to.
114	8	"Guacaine"	Ben Hernandez Bray	Ryan Keleher	December 9, 2022	608	4.93
A crew of hitmen dispatched by a cartel targets several food trucks around the city, and puzzling enough steal many boxes of avocado. The team soon learn that the avocados contain cocaine which was smuggled into the country and the cartel is seeking to retrieve them and that several restaurants and produce businesses are targeted for the same reason. Meanwhile, Nichelle considers getting a gun after her community center is burgled, but later decides against it. Also, Deacon worries when his son Matthew is involved in a fight at school, learning that he fought back because a kid spoke poorly of his job.
115	9	"Pariah"	Cherie Dvorak	Michael Gemballa	January 6, 2023	609	5.42
The team are assigned to investigate a series of arson attacks which seem random at first, but they eventually learn that a former member of the Third Street Bravo gang was responsible and that he is targeting business were former members work, members who he deemed to have betrayed the gang. Cabrera uses her local knowledge from growing up in the neighbourhood to get them intel on the assailant and his gang, notably with the help of her nephew and a member of the gang who was apprehended before targeting the gang's next target. Meanwhile, Luca learns that patrol officer Eva Durant is his half-sister, which he at first refused to believe, but Tan convinces him to get used to the prospect and get to know her better. Also, Hondo prepares to meet Nichelle's parents over dinner, to which he faces resistance from her father who seems to not approve of their relationship.
116	10	"Witness"	Alex Russell	Mellori Velasquez	January 13, 2023	610	5.53
A woman keeps the staff of a homeless shelter hostage, demanding her son to be returned to her. The team quickly deescalate the situation and later discover that her son Micah was taken from the shelter by the janitor. Furthermore, a biker gang is looking for Micah in connection to him witnessing the murder of an informant who worked for the Palmdale sheriff. Meanwhile, Hondo and Nichelle find themselves disagreeing over whether or not their daughter should be baptised, which Nichelle later agrees to do after Hondo figures out why he seeks it.
117	11	"Atonement"	Gonzalo Amat	Kent Rotherham & Cshediiz Coleman	January 20, 2023	611	5.54
When a car bombing takes the life of a Ukrainian refugee, the team works with the agent Jackie Vasquez from the FBI to find and stop a group of Russian ultra-nationalists who have infiltrated the Ukrainian community and are planning further attacks. Meanwhile, Luca and his brother Terry fight over the fact that they have a recently discovered half-sister. Though he convinces him to accept Durant, she doesn't feel the same and begins to distance herself from them. Also, Deacon is reunited with his pastor from his youth days over the course of the case, which also brings back old guilt from a friend's death.
118	12	"Addicted"	Mahesh Pailoor	John Amato	February 3, 2023	613	5.55
When a shooting occurs at a rehab center, the team finds themselves searching for Tim Spragg, a man seeking revenge against the centers and the personnel responsible for his brother Adrian dying. Searching for the root of his revenge spree, the team learns from Adrian's therapist that he blamed himself for his drug addiction and his brother as his main source of motivation. Meanwhile, Deacon is caught off-guard when Annie allows their daughter Lila to quit her school soccer team. Also, Luca asks Hondo to recommend Durant for a promotion, something he later learns she doesn't want and comes to accept her decision.
119	13	"Lion's Share"	Doug Aarniokoski	Michael Gemballa & David Aguilar	February 10, 2023	612	5.77
SWAT races against time to stop a violent rampage across Los Angeles that has links to a hostage situation that took place three years ago, (during "Lion's Den"). Hicks faces up to the choices he made during the siege. Meanwhile, Tan learns from Street and Cabrera that Bonnie has been cheating on him.
120	14	"Gut Punch"	Oz Scott	Amelia Sims	February 24, 2023	614	4.69
With Luca in San Diego and Tan benched after getting into a bar fight, 20-Squad, along with Rocker and Miguel Alfaro, investigates when a new drug hits the streets of Los Angeles. They soon find themselves racing to save a fellow officer whose life is in danger.
121	15	"To Protect & to Serve"	Billy Gierhart	Brandon Margolis & Brandon Sonnier	March 3, 2023	615	5.08
With Street on personal leave, Hondo, Deacon and Luca participate in Patrol Day on Hicks's orders. With Hondo partnering with Powell, Deacon with Alfaro and Luca working with his half-sister, Officer Eva Durant, the three groups head across L.A., only for Hondo and Powell to investigate the murder of a young African-American man while Deacon and Alfaro investigate a stolen necklace that soon turns into a case of man trying to rescue his wife, who's been kidnapped by a street gang. Meanwhile, Tan who's still suspended, investigates the circumstances that led to his wife having an affair that ruined their marriage.
122	16	"Blowback"	Cherie Dvorak	Alan Morgan	March 10, 2023	616	5.16
When classified information falls into the wrong hands, 20 Squad races to stop a plot targeting former members of the military from occurring. Meanwhile, Luca faces a challenging decision when his father, Carl is hospitalized after suffering a heart attack.
123	17	"Stockholm"	Michael D. Olmos	Mellori Velasquez	March 31, 2023	617	4.88
20-Squad reluctantly joins forces with the FBI to arrest a criminal who's on the FBI's Most Wanted List (the criminal having shot dead an FBI agent ten years ago). Hondo and Nichelle face a challenge when Nichelle goes into labor three weeks earlier than expected.
124	18	"Genesis"	Liz Graham	Vika Stubblebine	April 7, 2023	618	5.09
When a group of men attack an armored truck, stealing a necklace, 20 Squad investigate and discover it's connected to a Quran that was stolen by an American soldier while he was in Syria.
125	19	"Bunkies"	Guy Ferland	Sarah Alderson	April 21, 2023	619	5.36
The team race to identify a group of people who are holding the family of a prison guard hostage. Meanwhile, Tan finds himself struggling with a personal decision.
126	20	"All That Glitters"	Jay Harrington	Ryan Keleher	May 5, 2023	620	4.71
Hondo helps his former Marine squad leader and longtime friend, Danny Wright, search for Wright's missing daughter. Meanwhile, 20 Squad find themselves racing to stop a crew whose vicious home robberies are targeting the elderly. Note: This episode marks the directorial debut of Jay Harrington (David "Deacon" Kay).
127	21	"Forget Shorty"	Paul Bernard	Kent Rotherham	May 12, 2023	621	4.45
128	22	"Legacy"	Billy Gierhart	Brandon Margolis & Brandon Sonnier	May 19, 2023	622	4.65
Hondo and 20 squad team up with the DEA, led by Special Agent Mack Boyle, to conduct a massive gang sweep in Los Angeles, only to discover that the Zamora Cartel, a dangerous and vicious Mexican drug cartel is in the city and putting many lives in danger. Meanwhile, Hicks marks an important anniversary. Hondo and his team, with the DEA, race against time to stop Sancho Zamora, the head of Zamora Cartel who started a war in the streets of Los Angeles against those who killed his son and heir.: Note: Part 2 of this episode marks the final appearance of Alex Russell (Jim Street) and Kenny Johnson (Dominique Luca) in the opening credits and also as a series regular.

=== Season 7 (2024) ===
No. overall	No. in season	Title	Directed by	Written by	Original release date	Prod. code	U.S. viewers (millions)
129	1	"The Promise"	Billy Gierhart	Kent Rotherham	February 16, 2024	701	5.24
Hondo, Hicks and Powell are in Mexico City, having travelled there to escort a witness back to the United States. When the prison exchange goes wrong, Hondo finds himself racing to save an old witness whose mother was killed during a home invasion call that Hondo investigated ten years ago. Note:This is the first episode to have Anna Enger Ritch as Zoe Powell credited as a series regular while Shemar Moore (Daniel Harrison Jr.) is now credited as an Executive Producer and the episode along with "Peace Talks" were filmed on location in Mexico City.
130	2	"Peace Talks"	Billy Gierhart	Sarah Alderson	February 23, 2024	702	4.96
With Powell having gone missing, Hondo and Hicks search Mexico City for her working with local Mexican police. It's discovered that the police officer she was with is not only corrupt but planning on selling a thermobaric bomb capable of killing thousands to an unknown group of criminals.
131	3	"Good for Nothing"	Maja Vrvilo	Alan Morgan	March 1, 2024	703	5.02
When a group of Yakuza arrive in Los Angeles, leaving a trail of death and destruction in their wake, 20 Squad investigate the killings and also the Japanese ex-pats the Yakuza are targeting which soon leads them into a race against time to rescue a mother and son who are in grave danger.
132	4	"Spare Parts"	Cherie Dvorak	Ryan Keleher	March 8, 2024	704	4.73
20 Squad investigate when a Doctor and her daughter are abducted from a party in downtown Los Angeles by a Chilean arms dealer and his men.: This episode and the next episode, "End of the Road" aired the same night in the U.S. while in the UK, Sky Max aired "Spare Parts" and "End of the Road" a week apart from one another.
133	5	"End of the Road"	Jann Turner	Matthew T. Brown	March 8, 2024	705	4.45
During a training session with Long Beach PD's SWAT team, Street discovers a biker gang has stolen a cache of armor-piercing rounds. Street turns to his colleagues in 20 Squad for help in finding and bringing down the gang. During the case, Street has to intervene to stop some of Long Beach PD's SWAT from exacting revenge when their leader, Sergeant Barry Jones dies from injuries sustained in a gunfight against the gang. Note:This episode marks the final appearance of Alex Russell (Jim Street).
134	6	"Escape"	Hanelle Culpepper	John Amato	March 15, 2024	706	4.70
While on a morning jog, Hondo, Tan and Cabrera learn that a prison bus has crashed and upon investigating, discover three prisoners including a serial killer on the verge on embarking on a campaign of revenge have escaped, sending 20 Squad on the hunt for the three women before any lives are lost as Luca returns, rejoining the team. In the last few minutes, while out with Kelly, Luca responds to a robbery call but ends up being shot in the chest, ending the episode on a cliffhanger.
135	7	"Last Call"	Michael D. Olmos	Mellori Velasquez	April 5, 2024	707	4.49
Reeling from the news that Luca has been shot, 20 Squad band together to find the group responsible while after learning he's sustained permanent damage to his right arm, ending his career as a SWAT officer, Luca retires from the LAPD with Hondo and the entire LAPD force turning out to give Luca a send-off.: This episode marks the final appearance of Kenny Johnson (Dominique Luca).
136	8	"Family Man"	Larry Teng	Amelia Sims	April 12, 2024	708	4.61
When 20 Squad arrive at a fortified home that belongs to a family of doomsday preppers, things take a turn for the worse when Deacon ends up being captured and held hostage.
137	9	"Honeytrap"	Oz Scott	Michael Gemballa	April 19, 2024	709	4.46
When a female robbery crew lures a man and ends up killing him and a neighbor who had arrived to investigate at a hotel in downtown Los Angeles, FBI agent Jessica Vasquez calls in Hondo and 20 Squad for help in stopping the group before they strike again. During the case, Vasquez finds herself under pressure from her superior, Special Agent Chad Hettinger who seems more interested in achieving glory rather than bringing the group down.
138	10	"SNAFU"	Alex Russell	Charlie Haddaway	April 26, 2024	710	4.66
As a sniper begins terrorizing Los Angeles, targeting seemingly random people, 20 Squad investigate and discover a link to an unsolved murder case.
139	11	"Whispers"	Cherie Dvorak	Sarah Alderson	May 3, 2024	711	4.37
When a black-tie correspondents dinner is invaded by a group of masked men who eventually escape, Tan finds himself taking a personal interest in solving the case when it's revealed the group are targeting other journalists including his new girlfriend in regards to a suspected war crime.
140	12	"Allegiance"	Jay Harrington	Kent Rotherhan	May 10, 2024	712	4.30
When a teenage boy who's also the son of an energy company executive is kidnapped, 20 Squad race to save him despite the teenager's father refusing to cooperate. Meanwhile, Hondo struggles to keep 20 Squad together as Tan and Alfaro continue to butt heads.
141	13	"Twenty Squad"	Billy Gierhart	Matthew T. Brown & Daniela Labi	May 17, 2024	713	4.39
In the aftermath of an explosion that's left the members of 60 Squad including Cabrera hospitalized Hondo and 20 Squad, with assistance from FBI agent Jessica Vasquez and a retired Deacon, race against the clock to stop Zane Graham from blowing up half of Los Angeles in revenge for Hondo killing Zane's girlfriend. Meanwhile, as Powell attempts to stop Tan and Alfaro from fighting, Hondo begins contemplating the possibility of retiring from 20 Squad and the LAPD for good in the aftermath of the backlash he received as a result of shooting a suspect who was unarmed in front of a crowd of people on a basketball court. Note: this episode marks the final regular appearance of Rochel Aytes (Nichelle Carmichael) since she joins Watson.

=== Season 8 (2024–25) ===
No. overall	No. in season	Title	Directed by	Written by	Original release date	Prod. code	U.S. viewers (millions)
142	1	"Vanished"	Billy Gierhart	Kent Rotherham	October 18, 2024	801	4.05
Gus Dupont abducts Lucy Ambrose and nine school children. Hondo and Deacon chase robbery suspects. Powell tazers the suspect with the duffelbag, new team member Devin Gamble tackles another, while Tan and Hondo capture 16 year-old Ty Wallace, who was after his mother's stolen wedding ring. Alfaro hands Ty's collar to newbie Gamble. For saving her "Bubu," Zora gifts the team with sheqerpare, and nicknames Alfaro "Miko" which amuses Gamble. Hondo learns from Judy Kincaid that his former mentor who set him straight as a teen, Coach Howie Kincaid drove the bus. A news anchorwoman announces kidnappers' demands; Hondo suspects a cover-story. At a mine, Howie plants his medical alert bracelet on Denis Girard, who is shot ditching the empty truck. Commander Hicks expresses doubt about Gamble's family criminal history, including her father Ernie, a convicted cop-killer. Alfaro learns one of the mothers, Lydia Samuels, works in I.T. support, but Powell shows she does cyber security for HSX Technologies. Tan and Powell question Samuels, and learn what the kidnappers are really after. Dupont leaves Jacques to ensure the children don't escape. Coach calms the children as he discovers the mine is poisoned by sulfur dioxide, making a rescue time-critical.
143	2	"Gang Unit"	Cherie Dvorak	Matthew T. Brown	October 25, 2024	802	3.84
Four masked men raid the Compton Tigers stash house, killing Mo, Ash, Wes...and a mother next door. LASD's Gang Suppression Unit arrives to assist Hicks and Hondo, led by Lieutenant Raul Vignisson. Twenty-Squad learns it's the fourth stash-house hit. Hicks and Vignisson argue jurisdiction; Hondo reasons with him. Vignisson agrees, but from "our station, our way." Deputies Cesar Torres and Brian Lang greet 20-Squad; Deacon recognizes his old patrol partner, Alex "Dobes" Doberstein, who aspires to Vignisson's unit. Gamble, Powell, and Alfaro analyze street-cam footage of Danny Parra's car; his brother Arturo runs the Soldados. Lang tells Tan, Gamble's father killed one of their Deputies. SWAT and GSU storm the Soldados; Lang shoots Danny. Arturo insists Danny was a civilian. Gamble tells Tan about her past. Dobes tells Deacon how SWAT was his dream too. Powell deduces Danny was in Tigers' turf for a girlfriend; Emma Roddy. Hondo learns Vignisson led a gun buy-back, including the gun taken from Danny. Hondo, Tan, and Deacon, take their suspicions about GSU to Hicks. They race to Elsa Roddy's house to question Emma before GSU finds her. Dobes gives Deacon a lead, Powell provides a location, 20-Squad gears up.
144	3	"Life"	Oz Scott	Sarah Alderson	November 1, 2024	803	4.55
At Belwood Prison, Marvin serves eggs Benedict (aka cream of wheat); not what Albert wants. Another prisoner goes aggro instigating a fight and a lock-down. Hicks reminds Hondo that Warden David Bennett's wife is Deputy Chief Leticia Bennett, who oversees SWAT. An IED blows a hole in the kitchen wall. Hondo relieves Alfaro for disobeying an order. The hole draws 20-Squad deeper into the high-security wing, where "Life" prisoners are released from cells, trapping them. They save a guard, Kyle Johnson. The bomber escapes and prisoners raid the armory. Hicks calls more SWAT squads and asserts authority over Bennett. Hondo saves Kyle's son Jason. Benicio "El Rey" Ramirez, whose cousin Jesse "Cuchillo" Ramirez was shot by Hondo (in "Cuchillo"), takes the three hostage. Marvin tells Alfaro it wasn't about eggs, and names Luis Diaz; the bomber. Diaz is stabbed by The Prophet who ordered the escape. Bennett throws Hicks under the bus to the L.A.Times. Amaro finds the prophet; serial killer Moses Adams, who is posing as an injured doctor with his "nurse" Angela. Hicks calls Bennett "an incompetent moron" and Bennett threatens Hicks' job. Deacon recognizes Moses and warns Tan, but Moses and Angela are already leaving the prison.
145	4	"The Sepulveda Protocol"	Cherie Dvorak	Ryan Keleher	November 8, 2024	804	4.25
Hondo and Gamble bolster Mayor Castro's protection detail against K-Town suspect Paul Kang. Tan teaches SWAT Academy as a blackout creates chaos in the San Fernando Valley, forcing all officers to the Eagle's Nest. Hicks executes "The Sepulveda Protocol" deploying all SWAT officers to emergency patrol duty to handle crime spikes. Officer Alexis Cabrera and Sgt. Stevens head to NoHo; Tan and Alfaro take Studio City; Deacon and Powell pair up, but not before Powell disturbs a chess match, considered bad juju. Sam asks Tan and Alfaro for a wellness check on her neighbor Travis, and they find a neglected child, which enrages Alfaro. Deacon and Powell arrest robbery suspects and find a sabotaged substation, leading to discovery of three others. At a cooling station, Hondo deals with a second suspect, as Gamble saves Castro from Kang. Alfaro narrows the target to SCWP's lead engineer, Alice Burkes. Deacon and Powell respond and apprehend Ricky Lawson. Powell is shot in the vest and Burkes is taken by Owens Valley suspects led by Hank Fonda, who intends a terrorist attack against the Hollywood Dam. After the hazing (in "Life"), Gamble asks Hondo, why he picked her for 20-Squad; "Because you care."
146	5	"Human Interest"	Ben Hernandez Bray	Amelia Sims	November 15, 2024	805	4.13
Deputy Chief Bennett conducts her biannual review of SWAT...two months early; Hicks suspects an ulterior motive after Warden David Bennet's DoC suspension. Hondo defends the Chief as a stand-up cop. Tan's girlfriend Olivia Navarro is kidnapped by Pedro Legarra and El Sabueso. DEA Agent Gabriel Rodado who opposes the Vallarta Mexican drug cartel, is also taken. Rodado's partner, DEA Agent Bryant assists 20-Squad, providing intelligence on the Bloodhound's mistress turned informant, Maria Lazano. Hondo asks about local gangs that distribute cocaine. Bryant, "Los Magnificos." Alfaro's juvenile Long Beach contact has a brother in Los Mag, but Manuel Flores denies involvement. Powell and Tan analyze video of Doce Asesinos (A-12) surveillance on Rodaldo. They take fire and storm an A-12 stash house where they find Olivia setup to interview the Bloodhound for a human-interest story on missing students, enraging Bryant. Olivia doesn't reveal her contact, but does provide a clue leading to Navarro, who says Rodado broke under torture, giving up Maria's location. Twenty-Squad races to save both Maria and Rodado. Powell and Alfaro confront Officer Landry about hazing Gabel; Hondo benches him. Tan gets Olivia access to interview the Bloodhound...in holding. Bennett finds a new angle to leverage Hicks; Gamble.
147	6	"Hot Button"	Guy Ferland	Daniela Labi	November 22, 2024	806	4.62
Dr. Jeremy Scott pulls up to the gate of the Debra Greene Well Woman's Clinic, when a gunman shoots him and the guard, Randy. Thomas tells his mother Zoe about touring with Lincoln Gate in Portland. Zoe contributes $500, which conflicts with his adoptive parents, Josh and Diane. Miko deals with girlfriend drama, until he meets Deacon's sister-in-law, Nicole. Detective John Burrows tells 20-Squad of another clinic murder, nurse Mia. Deacon recognizes abortion as a hot-button issue. Randy gives a description. Mrs. Scott says one protester took photos. Powell finds John Clayton's doxing website, United for the Unborn. Clayton's alibi checks out. Hondo and Tan respond to the car BOLO at a gym. The suspect asked for self-defense trainer Zach, and gunshots sound. The car's owner is Paul Hayes who has a record. They find Paul's wife Hannah dead. Zach survives and says Paul abused her, and Jeremy and Mia were also Zach's students. Zach warns that Paul will kill their kids Gabby and Adam as well. Paul is already at their school, threatening Principal Mitchell Maupin. Hannah's exit plan included her sister Jenelle Wilson. Twenty-Squad rushes to find her and the kids before Paul.
148	7	"Home"	Jann Turner	Tianna Majumdar-Langham & Chris Bessounian	December 6, 2024	807	4.33
Tan continues SWAT Academy, GTA-style with Gamble. Tan damages the Charger. Gamble has a solution; her twin brother Leon. Tan protests as Leon is a known criminal, like her brother Judd. Hondo and Nichelle Carmichael argue over the appropriate daycare atmosphere for their daughter Vivienne. Twenty-Squad investigates why two Indian UCLA students, Anu Bose and her boyfriend Vasu Singh, were targeted by three gunmen. Motives include road rage and racism. But Anu was followed before, and provides a photo. Powell runs the plates to a P.I. firm. Owner York Shafer says Anu's parents, Jayesh and Aalia Bose, hired him. Hicks urges Powell to call her son to reconcile. A shooter goes after Vasu at the hospital. Hondo and Deacon respond, asking Anu if her partents could've hired them. She explains, Vasu is Sikh, not Hindu. Hicks and Gamble question Jayesh and Aalia, who object to separatist extremism, not his religion. Tan briefs Hicks and Deacon on Shivan Samtani, his brother Tejan, and the third Nilesh Bindal. Powell finds two users of the Sikh separatist website Vasu built, who might be the next targets; Arjun Vahali and Raj Gupta. Twenty-Squad responds to active shooters at the Sikh temple.
149	8	"Left of Boom"	Billy Gierhart	Allen L. Sowelle	December 13, 2024	808	4.37
Twenty-Squad responds to 12.5 kilos of stolen neutronium 613. Lt. Randolph meets them at the truck, but it's empty. Jeremiah Jacobs says he got the job online and knows nothing. A shooter, Oraz Mustafin also stole ammonium nitrate. The team prepares to stop terrorists from triggering a dirty bomb in L.A.. The FBI also has a BOLO for Khalid Torani. Alfaro and Powell follow a lead with Vadim at Velvet Vixen and find Jeremiah lied. Hick's says we gotta stop this thing, "left of boom." Sgt. Garcia from 70-Squad joins the effort, but the target building is clean. Hicks reveals to Jeremiah, his wife is pregnant, getting a new lead; the Federal Building. Powell wonders about Alfaro's boxing skills, and why he won't use them in the annual LAPD versus LAFD "smoker" boxing tournament. Townsend antagonizes Alfaro into a match. After refusing numerous calls, Gamble takes Hondo's advice to "face the demon" and visits her father Ernie in prison. He says there's a bounty on someone in 20-Squad, and it's going down today...
150	9	"Open Season"	Jay Harrington	Charlie Haddaway	January 31, 2025	809	3.14
...Gamble rushes for her phone to warn 20-Squad. Dobes says Tan cut half the SWAT Academy class, which worries Deacon. Hondo learns he's got a million-dollar bounty after Trae Williams tries shooting him. Powell is worried for Denise "Nisi" Shaw (from "Bunkies") and checks-in with Nisi's boss Christy; Nisi is passed out. Twenty-Squad tries uncovering who wants revenge on Hondo. Trae says his name is Spoke. Motorcyclists make an attempt, stalling Hondo's Charger, stranding him in the Compton hood... Leeland Park... One 9er's turf... alone! Hicks rolls 40-Squad to help search. Twenty-Squad and Sgt. Stevens hit a One-Niner apartment, but Remi "don't want that smoke." Ace, Ky, and others pursue. Hondo takes one, sending a silent 911; shoots another, running out of ammo; punches Ky, disarming him, but Ace gets the drop. Tan and Alfaro respond. Nisi swears she's not using; only coffee and vape. She fears Colleen Ellis will take her kids. Alfaro finds Benny "Spoke" Lawson, but he's out of the game. Deacon and Tan clash over SWAT Academy changes. Alfaro tells Powell to check Nisi's vape pen for tampering. Trae provides another clue, leading to Ameer Riles, who calls in... it's "open season" on SWAT. Dedicated to the Memory of Jeremy Martinez & Robert "Robbie" Redner
151	10	"The Heights"	Michael D. Olmos	Jamil Akim O'Quinn	February 7, 2025	810	3.47
Officers Glover and Jacobs pat down truck-stop working girl Martha as shots are fired. Glover puts her in the patrol car, Jacobs calls it in. They investigate. Jacobs is shot and gunman Juan Pujols gets in their patrol car taking Martha hostage. Alfaro and Nicole see each other secretly; Alfaro forgets his badge...at Deacon's house. Hondo's cousin Andre visits from Houston, but he's running from a loan shark. Twenty-Squad arrive to handle the hostage situation. They learn they're dealing with Los Altos ("The Heights"), a D.R. biker gang searching for cocaine smuggled in FKO semi-trucks hired by Valentina, a Latin pop music super-star. They head to Santa Clarita Studios to talk to the crew, but gunman Carlo Cristobal, Felix Liriano, and Alex Moro arrive first. Powell briefs them about Dex Martinez, their West Coast leader with ties to the Sinaloa Cartel. Deacon struggles to keep his deal Martha. After reviewing the Tour Manager's video, they spot Lola Fay with the crate containing 24-million dollars of drugs. It's a race to find her before Los Altos does. Ramón threatens Eva, Santiago terrifies a woman, and Dex grabs Lola. Twenty-Squad take them down, and Sgt. Stevens collars Dex.
152	11	"AMBER"	Matthew McLoota	Sarah Alderson	February 14, 2025	811	3.40
Kate Walz witnesses her little Gracie's abduction. Twenty-Squad tries to find her within the critical first three-hours. Hicks' dispute with Bennett jeopardizes Gamble's career and reputation; her brothers and cousins are suspected of train cargo heists. Hicks must decide whether to bench her while I.A. investigates. A motel manager responds to the Amber alert and a suspect, Jerod Whitlock. The girl isn't Gracie, but Whitlock did have outstanding warrants. Sex offender Michael Boswell is next, but he has an alibi. Deacon and Powell check a lead on the car; its owner is supposedly in Baja, says the neighbor Steven Owens. Powell enters Owens' home when she hears something, but it's only a dog whining. Then she goes off on Owens after seeing Gracie's favorite foods. Deacon and Annie face off against each other in the interrogation room, after Powell's rash illegal search. Gamble confronts Bennett. After more thought, Powell provides a lead to photographer Denton Pryor. Owens tries to skip town. The squad splits up; Powell and Tan to a barn from the photos, and Sgt. Stevens, Gamble, Hondo and Deacon to the train station. Tan checks on Mrs. Marks, whose Kanesha was also taken but never found.
153	12	"Deep Cover"	Ramaa Mosley	John Amato	February 21, 2025	812	3.48
Alfaro goes undercover to bust Duc Trinh. Outside waits Hondo, Deacon, Tan, and Sergeant Donovan Rocker. Alfaro runs into Stefan Morina and Alex Abazi from a prior Long Beach deep cover case against the Albanian mob. Stefan wants Alfaro on a job for his uncle, Omar Morina. Alfaro gives the signal for 20-Squad to take down Trinh. At SWAT Academy, Dobes is injured by a breech charge. Alfaro goes back undercover as "Zef" to bust Omar, whose jobs are dropping bodies. Hicks wants to pull Alfaro because he got sidetracked getting Stefan sober. Dren Kodra takes Alfaro's phone before the heist. Rocker identifies Maria Salazar, leading them to First River Bank. Tan finds exotic dancer Irina Alamov from Dren's phone. Omar hires Mehmet and Esad, angering Alex, so Omar kills him. Tan blames himself for Dobes' accident; Deacon reassures him. Irina provides a location to Omar's warehouse. Alfaro tries to stop Stefan from using, revealing he is LAPD, forcing him to knock Stefan out. The squad raid the warehouse too late. Stephan gives a lead to their next heist. Dobes injury ends his career and he blames Tan for pushing him too hard.
154	13	"High Ground"	Garry A. Brown	Kent Rotherham	February 28, 2025	813	3.67
With Gamble benched, she and Powell plan a 22-mile hike up Condor Highway to high ground on Thunder Ridge in the San Gabriels. Hondo's pop, Daniel Harrelson, Sr., pulls $5,000 of his mom's money; he intends to find out why. Hondo tells Powell, the IA investigation will go faster if Gamble submits her statement of defense. At the trailhead, Gary tries to discourage them. Alfaro's sister's boss, Evan Frost wants a new security firm; Deacon interviews. Up the trail, they find CC, who is pregnant and injured...near an illegal marijuana farm. Gary returns with a gun, and other gunmen. The two determine to save CC. Hondo discovers Pop and Andre have been ripped off by a protein powder snake oil pyramid scheme. Powell and Gamble encounter Tia, whose boss is Le Tran Minh, a ruthless Khoi Ling Syndicate drug lord. They must save ten women from the farm before Minh kills them all, while also evading the guards Kurt and Mark, and cartel thugs Zhen and Yuan. Hicks, Hondo, Deacon, and Alfaro analyze the emergency call to locate Powell and Gamble.
155	14	"The Santa Clara"	Gonzalo Amat	Tianna Majumdar-Langham & Chris Bessounian	March 7, 2025	814	3.20
Dobes files suit against Tan for his SWAT Academy injury. At Alderson Museum, robbers steal a billion dollars in gold, raised from The Santa Clara shipwreck, killing Garth, Natasha, and two guards; only the Columbian cultural attaché Karla Lopez survives. Gamble awaits her IA verdict from union lawyer Edward Yanick, but one of three senior IA committee members withholds his sign-off. Twenty-Squad questions Captain Russell Jones, who salvaged the treasure, then lost it to the government. Dobes intends calling Deacon as a lawsuit witness. Hicks tries to convince IA Lieutenant Ian Wanstead to clear Gamble. Karla identifies Jack Givens as the shooter, and Randy Pruitt as accomplice. The squad finds they've already been hit by another deadly crew, and recover only the gold mask. Karla takes the mask, but the embassy envoy says he never received it. Sgt. Stevens confirms Karla left. Powell sees a connection to an indigenous group claiming the gold; Karla "Quimayara" Lopez. Powell tells Deacon more breech charges detonated prematurely. Hicks gives Gamble the good news; she's been cleared. Twenty-Squad go after both Givens' and Carla's crews. Deacon tells Tan about the defective charges, ending Dobes' lawsuit.
156	15	"Hostages"	Maja Vrvilo	Matthew T. Brown	March 14, 2025	815	3.69
Twenty-Squad goes plainclothes to stake out a locker at a bus station, waiting for an anti-government terrorist bomber code-named Goliath to claim the encrypted hard-drive inside. At HQ, Deputy Chief Bennett personally supervises, while pressuring Hicks to brief the FBI. Chase and Davis Rodwig and three others, Lee, Danny, and Owen, just botched a private cash vault robbery and missed their getaway bus. Trapped by uni's Chase opens fire on their patrol cars and charges back into the station to take everyone hostage. Hondo wants to engage, but Bennett orders them to maintain cover and focus on Goliath. Hondo sees the locker emptied in the confusion. The squad must ditch their guns, badges, and com-units to blend in as hostages. From video, Hicks can see three suspects near the locker; PJ Gorham, Amy Multon, and Lewis Jackson. Chase demands blacked-out buses to escape. Hicks and Bennett argue tactics, leading to Hicks' insubordination. Hondo and Gamble treat Chase's GSW. Alfaro comforts elderly PJ. Amy refuses to talk to Deacon. Tan eyes Lewis who eyes his backpack. Andrew suggests rushing a gunman with Tan. The squad must secure the HDD, uncover Goliath, and neutralize the gunmen, all while keeping the hostages safe.
157	16	"Hail Mary"	Solvan "Slick" Naim	Ryan Keleher	April 4, 2025	816	3.16
Gamble and Alfaro moonlight with Deacon's Elite Protection, overseeing Kenny "the Jet" Smith's detail. Andre enlists with the U.S. Marine Corps, surprising Hondo. Powell allows Thomas to meet his biological father Jace Graham. "Unofficial Handler" Heather looks for Ice Jackson, Southern Coastal University's star receiver. Heading towards the garage, shots ring out. Gunmen abduct Ice and Caleb Webb. Powell identifies Nick May, whose LKA is a La Tuna Canyon ranch. They find they're dealing with a violent drug dealer brutally torturing Ice and Caleb for missing molly. Analyzing video, they find a sign Bunker Work Boot Outlet, but there are dozens of locations. A second suspect, Steve Hock, links them to Bakersfield drug gang, the Oildale 22's. Deacon questions Heather again; there was a dorm incident, but Ice and Caleb were in Long Beach. Deacon, Powell and Tan question resident advisor Mike Reynolds, finding the third gunman, Henry Labeau, already there. Mike says he dealt with "Bird" who is a "stone-cold psycho." Alfaro identifies "Bird" as Tim Birddell. Gamble finds a location; 20-Squad storms it. Deacon receives unwanted attention from Heather. Hondo, Deacon, and Jerry Rice visit Ice and Caleb at the hospital.
158	17	"The Enemy Within"	Ben Hernandez Bray	Allen L. Sowelle	April 11, 2025	817	3.53
Heather calls Deacon claiming a B&E. Olivia Navarro suspects Tan's neighbors are taxing the electricity with an illegal grow-op. Officers Bedrosian and Rivera play hoops in the hood with Puppet and Guero when someone shoots both officers. Puppet identifies Oscar "Memo" Torres, but he's got an alibi. Another cop is shot. Deacon suspects Heather staged the B&E. Alfaro and Powell question Puppet, who describes a Bronco. Tan finds the cops were tied to the mishandling of the De La Costa high-school shooting. Deacon notices they all had sessions with LAPD psychologist Dr. Wendy Hughes. Hughes says one parent filed suit; Nelson Phillips. A laser alerts Hondo, someone is targeting Phillips. Officer Claude Fournier escapes but drops his rifle. Fournier's motive becomes clear. Deacon confronts Heather. Powell uncovers another potential target, Fournier's Union Representative, Dorian Klitschko. When they arrive, they find him beaten and files missing. Fournier calls "Dr. Wendy" luring her out of HQ. The team trace the call to capture him. Tan and Olivia agree to move in together. Heather sends roses to Deacon's house. Deacon warns Heather to stay away from his family, but she insists he wanted to see her....
159	18	"Exploited"	Billy Gierhart	John Amato & Vika Stubblebine	April 18, 2025	818	3.50
Miko's mother, Marie Alfaro says her ex, Wayne Collins wants to "make amends." Four Dark Angels bikers search The Passport Lounge for Kate, shooting a bouncer and Maya after she lies. Deacon asks Hondo about a rumoured shortlist to replace SWAT Commander Hicks. Fifty-Squad Officer Cabrera bolsters 20-Squad at the club, arresting Charles "Chuck" Gomez and identifying Nolan Rizzolo and Jackson Nix. Hondo, confronting Bennett, discovers he's on her shortlist. Maya says Kate's an aspiring actor. Miko warns Wayne to stay away. They find Kate's social media with Alex Murphy, who says Kate found an agent, Susan Connor. Bikers get there first. Tan captures Ben Sennott, Kate's brother. Susan says Kate was lured away by a "producer" and they find Kate's cam-girl videos. Hicks has Tan contact Vice. Gamble gets a lead to Bryce Morris. Hondo and Gamble question Morris and a girl, Sam. Tan questions Lucy who seems nervous. Hicks suspects Morris trafficks the girls. Tan logs into Lucy's cam-girl site; she asks for help, giving 20-Squad legal grounds to raid the mansion. Wayne apologizes, but not entirely. Miko and Marie tell him to leave. Bennett "promotes" Hicks to the Art Theft Unit; Hicks Resigns.
160	19	"Run to Ground"	Cherie Dvorak	Amelia Sims	May 2, 2025	819	2.82
A runaway forklift at Belle of Piru fruit packing injures Wilson before an explosion allows six CDCR felons in a work gang to "run to ground" as Gordon Pratt shoots Longoria, handing the gun to Delgado. Commander Hicks packs up after resigning. Chief Bennett takes interim command. Zoe and Jace Graham become awkward as he gets to know their son Thomas. 20-Squad captures Delgado. Hondo comments to Bennett the inmates are from Belwood Prison, from which her husband Warden David Bennett was fired (in "Life"). Warden Bennett also approved high-level felons to work outside the prison. Other escaped inmates include Luis Tinoco, Javi Losa, Kevin Meyers, Liam Nelson, and Donovan Lee. Devon and Leon Gamble clash over life-saving surgery after their father Ernie's heart attack. Tan's lead to Nina Escarra's phone logs allows Powell and Cabrera to capture Tinoco. Tan finds the forklift was rigged. 20-Squad captures Myers, playing him against Tinoco to discover the escapee's plans. Hondo and Hicks confront Bennett with suspicions about David's work program kickbacks. Gamble discovers the gang is targeting a children's birthday event at Serbian mobster Alexander Volkov's house. Pratt takes young Anne hostage. Lee takes Leticia and David Bennett hostage.
161	20	"Devil Dog"	Alex Russell	Sarah Alderson	May 9, 2025	820	2.83
Marie gets a black eye from Wayne Collins, enraging Miko. Hondo and Pop learn Andre is AWOL. Commander Hicks runs into Rocker...who's dating Molly Hicks. Hicks, "Does your wife know?" Captain Peters says Private Harrelson is a "person of interest" in Private Randall's murder, and MP's have jurisdiction. Sgt. Wilson escorts them out, but first, Hondo finds his uncle's watch left behind; Andre was framed. Deacon helps, while Daniel Sr. stakes out the base. Tan advises Miko, let uni's arrest Collins. Bartender Cherilyn says Andre and Randall were friendly and celebrated surviving "The Crucible." Hondo knows it's a 54-hour endurance test, followed by a tattoo. They find Andre shot, saying Capt. Peters killed Randall to cover-up stolen weapons. MP's Riggs and Stanton arrest Andre. Daniel Sr. bluffs his way into the hospital to help Andre. Tan runs a plate to ex-ATF agent Dale Radcliffe. Corporal Cobbs escorts Daniel Sr. out, but he sees Stanton taking Andre. Hicks tells Hondo, Radcliffe and Peters were in the same unit. Tan identifies Radcliffe's associate, Ryan O'Keefe, a militia leader on the FBI terror watch-list. Hondo and Deacons go after Radcliffe and Peters. Stanton takes Andre off-base to kill him.
162	21	"Ride or Die"	Maja Vrvilo	Kent Rotherham	May 16, 2025	821	3.16
Chantel Rivers flags down the truck driver, providing no choice but to stop, while Jax, Ray, and Torque Vaughn highjack his Gatesmark Luxury Transport. While Deacon plays with his son Samuel at the playground, Heather talks to his daughter Victoria. As 20-Squad responds, Hondo and Deacon recognize the hijacker who supposedly died 10 years prior. They stop the truck, but Torque escapes in a Lamborghini. Tan finds the owner, fentanyl kingpin Rico Castro. Hicks advises Deacon to check Heather's background. Tan gets a lead on a Porsche at Ralph Hayes' Exotic Motors, which the team raids, finding Leon on-scene. A dash cam vindicates him of Hayes' murder. Powell and Tan learn that Castro's lawyer, Gail Tomkins took his McLaren and 60 million dollars' worth of drug network data. Tan narrows the buyer to J.J. Ricken (aka "Racer X"), Devon provides a clue from Leon, and the team mobilizes to intercept the exchange. Hondo races Torque before he can steal a woman's car with a baby on-board. Deacon learns Heather stalked a professor and arrests her inside his home. Devon tries making peace with Leon, but finds the Lamborghini in his backyard. Unable to arrest him, she resigns from L.A. SWAT.
163	22	"Return to Base"	Billy Gierhart	Teleplay by : Matthew T. Brown; Story by : Matthew T. Brown & Daniela Labi	May 16, 2025	822	3.02
A man down while Gamble transitions back to Oakland, SWAT chases meth cooks, who trip landmines in the park. James Hollister from the L.A. Police Youth Group visits Deacon to thank him for a sizable donation. Hicks gives Tan a shot at SWAT Mayoral Liaison. Alfaro finds footage of drones planting petal mines. The Red Sword leader demands they free Russian mercenary Dmitri Rykov. CIA Agent Owen Briggs arrives saying, focus on the mines and "Leave Red Sword to us." Tan's Russian mob contact, Yuri, provides a tip to Matsnev. Hicks rejects Hondo's replacement list, and advises him "set her straight" as Gamble's team leader should. Hondo confronts Briggs who wants to exchange Rykov for ten U.S. aid workers captured by Russia. The team raids Matsnev's furniture warehouse for the mines, learning they were a distraction to extract Rykov from CIA custody. Hondo and Rykov return to base. Hondo deduces Red Sword is actually trying to kill Rykov. Gamble arrives to empty her locker, as Red Sword attacks SWAT HQ. Hondo convinces Gamble to stay. Deacon buys the team gifts. A robbery puts officers under fire, so 20-Squad gears up to save the city.

== Home media ==
Season	Episodes	Region 1 DVD release dates
1	22	August 28, 2018
2	23	August 20, 2019
3	21	August 18, 2020
4	18	August 24, 2021

== Viewing figures ==
=== Season 1 ===
Viewership and ratings per episode of List of S.W.A.T. (2017 TV series) episodes
No.	Title	Air date	Rating/share (18–49)	Viewers (millions)	DVR (18–49)	DVR viewers (millions)	Total (18–49)	Total viewers (millions)
1	"Pilot"	November 2, 2017	1.1/4	6.74	0.8	3.70	1.9	10.52
2	"Cuchillo"	November 9, 2017	1.0/4	6.58	0.9	3.69	1.9	10.27
3	"Radical"	November 16, 2017	0.9/3	6.26	0.8	3.22	1.7	9.48
4	"Pamilya"	November 23, 2017	1.1/4	5.84	0.9	3.32	2.0	9.17
5	"Imposters"	November 30, 2017	1.0/4	6.71	0.8	3.11	1.8	9.83
6	"Octane"	December 7, 2017	0.9/4	6.25	0.8	3.27	1.7	9.52
7	"Homecoming"	December 14, 2017	1.0/4	6.45	—N/a	—N/a	—N/a	—N/a
8	"Miracle"	December 21, 2017	1.0/4	6.28	—N/a	—N/a	—N/a	—N/a
9	"Blindspots"	January 4, 2018	1.1/4	6.21	—N/a	—N/a	—N/a	—N/a
10	"Seizure"	January 11, 2018	1.1/4	6.38	1.0	3.96	2.1	10.35
11	"K-Town"	January 18, 2018	1.0/4	6.02	0.9	3.68	1.9	9.70
12	"Containment"	February 1, 2018	1.0/4	6.23	0.9	3.72	1.9	9.95
13	"Fences"	March 1, 2018	0.8/3	5.32	0.9	3.72	1.7	9.04
14	"Ghosts"	March 8, 2018	0.9/4	5.57	0.9	3.65	1.8	9.26
15	"Crews"	March 29, 2018	0.8/3	5.26	0.9	3.78	1.7	9.05
16	"Payback"	April 5, 2018	0.8/3	5.05	0.9	3.73	1.7	8.78
17	"Armory"	April 12, 2018	0.9/4	5.31	0.8	3.54	1.7	8.85
18	"Patrol"	April 19, 2018	0.8/3	5.32	0.9	3.66	1.7	8.98
19	"Source"	April 26, 2018	0.8/3	5.22	0.8	3.47	1.6	8.69
20	"Vendetta"	May 3, 2018	0.8/4	5.09	0.8	3.44	1.6	8.53
21	"Hunted"	May 10, 2018	0.9/4	5.54	0.8	3.29	1.7	8.83
22	"Hoax"	May 17, 2018	0.9/4	6.03	0.8	3.16	1.7	9.19

=== Season 2 ===
Viewership and ratings per episode of List of S.W.A.T. (2017 TV series) episodes
No.	Title	Air date	Rating/share (18–49)	Viewers (millions)	DVR (18–49)	DVR viewers (millions)	Total (18–49)	Total viewers (millions)
1	"Shaky Town"	September 27, 2018	0.7/3	4.70	0.8	3.46	1.5	8.16
2	"Gasoline Drum"	October 4, 2018	0.7/3	5.21	0.8	3.22	1.5	8.44
3	"Fire and Smoke"	October 11, 2018	0.8/4	5.40	0.7	3.03	1.5	8.43
4	"Saving Face"	October 18, 2018	0.7/3	5.49	0.7	3.15	1.4	8.65
5	"S.O.S."	October 25, 2018	0.7/3	5.36	0.7	3.14	1.4	8.51
6	"Never Again"	November 1, 2018	0.7/3	5.22	0.7	3.26	1.4	8.48
7	"Inheritance"	November 8, 2018	0.7/3	5.13	0.8	3.25	1.5	8.38
8	"The Tiffany Experience"	November 15, 2018	0.8/3	5.13	0.7	3.24	1.5	8.37
9	"Day Off"	November 29, 2018	0.8/3	5.20	0.7	3.48	1.5	8.68
10	"1000 Joules"	December 6, 2018	0.7/3	5.34	0.8	3.50	1.5	8.84
11	"School"	January 3, 2019	0.9/4	5.99	0.8	3.45	1.7	9.44
12	"Los Huesos"	January 10, 2019	0.9/4	5.91	0.8	3.39	1.7	9.30
13	"Encore"	January 31, 2019	0.9/5	5.68	0.8	3.60	1.7	9.28
14	"The B-Team"	February 7, 2019	0.8/4	4.96	0.8	3.71	1.6	8.72
15	"Fallen"	February 14, 2019	0.9/5	5.59	0.7	3.33	1.6	8.93
16	"Pride"	February 21, 2019	0.9/4	5.47	0.7	3.42	1.6	8.89
17	"Jack"	March 7, 2019	0.9/4	5.58	0.8	3.37	1.7	8.95
18	"Cash Flow"	April 4, 2019	0.7/4	4.73	0.7	3.32	1.4	8.06
19	"Invisible"	April 18, 2019	0.8/4	5.09	0.7	3.32	1.5	8.42
20	"Rocket Fuel"	April 25, 2019	0.7/4	5.01	0.6	3.06	1.3	8.02
21	"Day of Dread"	May 2, 2019	0.7/4	5.00	0.7	3.11	1.4	8.11
22	"Trigger Creep"	May 9, 2019	0.7/4	5.02	0.6	2.92	1.3	7.95
23	"Kangaroo"	May 16, 2019	0.9/5	5.75	0.6	3.22	1.5	8.98

=== Season 3 ===
Viewership and ratings per episode of List of S.W.A.T. (2017 TV series) episodes
No.	Title	Air date	Rating/share (18–49)	Viewers (millions)	DVR (18–49)	DVR viewers (millions)	Total (18–49)	Total viewers (millions)
1	"Fire in the Sky"	October 2, 2019	0.6/3	4.03	0.7	3.65	1.3	7.68
2	"Bad Faith"	October 9, 2019	0.6/3	3.73	0.7	3.43	1.3	7.17
3	"Funny Money"	October 16, 2019	0.5/3	3.56	0.7	3.38	1.2	6.95
4	"Immunity"	October 23, 2019	0.6/3	3.76	0.7	3.27	1.3	7.05
5	"The LBC"	October 30, 2019	0.5/2	3.43	0.6	3.39	1.1	6.83
6	"Kingdom"	November 6, 2019	0.5/3	3.84	0.6	3.21	1.1	7.05
7	"Track"	November 13, 2019	0.5/3	3.09	0.6	3.20	1.2	6.29
8	"Lion's Den"	November 20, 2019	0.5/3	3.76	0.7	3.20	1.2	6.97
9	"Sea Legs"	November 27, 2019	0.7/4	5.23	0.6	3.04	1.3	8.27
10	"Monster"	December 11, 2019	0.6/3	4.81	0.6	3.09	1.2	7.90
11	"Bad Cop"	January 15, 2020	0.6/3	3.66	0.6	3.45	1.2	7.11
12	"Good Cop"	January 22, 2020	0.5/3	3.39	0.6	3.53	1.1	6.93
13	"Ekitai Rashku"	January 29, 2020	0.6/4	4.45	0.6	3.28	1.2	7.73
14	"Animus"	March 4, 2020	0.5	3.47	0.6	3.40	1.1	6.88
15	"Knockout"	March 11, 2020	0.6	4.19	0.6	3.06	1.1	7.21
16	"Gunpowder Treason"	March 18, 2020	0.6	4.01	0.6	3.26	1.2	7.28
17	"Hotel L.A"	March 25, 2020	0.5	3.82	0.6	3.14	1.1	6.96
18	"Stigma"	April 8, 2020	0.5	3.85	0.6	3.34	1.1	7.10
19	"Vice"	April 22, 2020	0.6	4.76	0.6	2.98	1.2	7.74
20	"Wild Ones"	April 29, 2020	0.7	5.03	0.5	2.93	1.2	7.97
21	"Diablo"	May 20, 2020	0.6	4.82	—N/a	—N/a	—N/a	—N/a

=== Season 4 ===
Viewership and ratings per episode of List of S.W.A.T. (2017 TV series) episodes
No.	Title	Air date	Rating (18–49)	Viewers (millions)	DVR (18–49)	DVR viewers (millions)	Total (18–49)	Total viewers (millions)
1	"3 Seventeen Year Olds"	November 11, 2020	0.4	2.75	0.5	2.70	0.9	5.45
2	"Stakeout"	November 11, 2020	0.4	2.56	0.4	2.70	0.8	5.27
3	"The Black Hand Man"	November 18, 2020	0.3	2.25	—N/a	—N/a	—N/a	—N/a
4	"Memento Mori"	November 25, 2020	0.4	3.39	—N/a	—N/a	—N/a	—N/a
5	"Fracture"	December 9, 2020	0.5	3.88	—N/a	—N/a	—N/a	—N/a
6	"Hopeless Sinner"	December 16, 2020	0.5	4.06	—N/a	—N/a	—N/a	—N/a
7	"Under Fire"	January 13, 2021	0.4	3.28	0.5	2.90	0.9	6.18
8	"Crusade"	January 27, 2021	0.4	3.08	—N/a	—N/a	—N/a	—N/a
9	"Next of Kin"	February 17, 2021	0.4	2.99	0.5	2.98	0.9	5.97
10	"Buried"	March 3, 2021	0.5	3.62	0.4	2.84	0.9	6.46
11	"Positive Thinking"	March 10, 2021	0.4	2.84	0.5	3.06	0.9	5.90
12	"U-Turn"	March 24, 2021	0.6	3.71	—N/a	—N/a	—N/a	—N/a
13	"Sins of the Fathers"	April 7, 2021	0.4	3.10	0.5	2.91	0.9	6.01
14	"Reckoning"	April 21, 2021	0.4	3.06	0.6	2.93	1.0	5.99
15	"Local Heroes"	May 5, 2021	0.4	3.11	0.4	2.83	0.9	5.94
16	"Lockdown"	May 12, 2021	0.4	2.96	0.4	2.63	0.8	5.59
17	"Whistleblower"	May 19, 2021	0.4	3.13	0.5	2.57	0.9	5.70
18	"Veritas Vincit"	May 26, 2021	0.5	3.17	0.5	2.79	0.9	5.96

=== Season 5 ===
Viewership and ratings per episode of List of S.W.A.T. (2017 TV series) episodes
No.	Title	Air date	Timeslot (ET)	Rating (18–49)	Viewers (millions)	DVR (18–49)	DVR viewers (millions)	Total (18–49)	Total viewers (millions)
1	"Vagabundo"	October 1, 2021	Friday; 8:00 p.m.	0.4	4.96	—N/a	—N/a	—N/a	—N/a
2	"Madrugada"	October 8, 2021	Friday; 8:00 p.m.	0.4	4.99	—N/a	—N/a	—N/a	—N/a
3	"27 David"	October 15, 2021	Friday; 8:00 p.m.	0.5	4.99	—N/a	—N/a	—N/a	—N/a
4	"Sentinel"	October 22, 2021	Friday; 8:00 p.m.	0.5	4.70	0.3	2.11	0.8	6.81
5	"West Coast Offense"	November 5, 2021	Friday; 8:00 p.m.	0.5	4.93	—N/a	—N/a	—N/a	—N/a
6	"Crisis Actor"	November 12, 2021	Friday; 8:00 p.m.	0.4	4.84	—N/a	—N/a	—N/a	—N/a
7	"Keep the Faith"	December 3, 2021	Friday; 8:00 p.m.	0.5	5.33	0.3	2.03	0.8	7.36
8	"Safe House"	December 10, 2021	Friday; 8:00 p.m.	0.5	4.98	0.3	1.90	0.8	6.88
9	"Survive"	January 2, 2022	Sunday; 10:00 p.m.	0.4	3.77	—N/a	—N/a	—N/a	—N/a
10	"Three Guns"	January 9, 2022	Sunday; 10:00 p.m.	0.4	3.73	—N/a	—N/a	—N/a	—N/a
11	"Old School Cool"	February 27, 2022	Sunday; 10:00 p.m.	0.5	3.83	—N/a	—N/a	—N/a	—N/a
12	"Provenance"	March 6, 2022	Sunday; 10:00 p.m.	0.5	4.00	—N/a	—N/a	—N/a	—N/a
13	"Short Fuse"	March 13, 2022	Sunday; 10:00 p.m.	0.5	4.15	—N/a	—N/a	—N/a	—N/a
14	"Albatross"	March 20, 2022	Sunday; 10:00 p.m.	0.5	3.94	—N/a	—N/a	—N/a	—N/a
15	"Donor"	March 27, 2022	Sunday; 10:00 p.m.	0.5	3.67	—N/a	—N/a	—N/a	—N/a
16	"The Fugitive"	April 10, 2022	Sunday; 10:00 p.m.	0.4	3.95	—N/a	—N/a	—N/a	—N/a
17	"Cry Foul"	April 17, 2022	Sunday; 10:00 p.m.	0.5	4.04	—N/a	—N/a	—N/a	—N/a
18	"Family"	April 24, 2022	Sunday; 10:00 p.m.	0.5	4.19	—N/a	—N/a	—N/a	—N/a
19	"Incoming"	May 1, 2022	Sunday; 10:00 p.m.	0.4	3.88	—N/a	—N/a	—N/a	—N/a
20	"Quandary"	May 8, 2022	Sunday; 10:00 p.m.	0.4	4.08	—N/a	—N/a	—N/a	—N/a
21	"Zodiac"	May 15, 2022	Sunday; 10:00 p.m.	0.4	4.09	—N/a	—N/a	—N/a	—N/a
22	"Farewell"	May 22, 2022	Sunday; 10:00 p.m.	0.3	3.36	—N/a	—N/a	—N/a	—N/a

=== Season 6 ===
Viewership and ratings per episode of List of S.W.A.T. (2017 TV series) episodes
No.	Title	Air date	Rating (18–49)	Viewers (millions)	DVR (18–49)	DVR viewers (millions)	Total (18–49)	Total viewers (millions)
1	"Thai Hard"	October 7, 2022	0.4	4.76	0.2	1.73	0.6	6.50
2	"Thai Another Day"	October 14, 2022	0.4	4.61	0.2	1.81	0.7	6.43
3	"Woah Black Betty"	October 21, 2022	0.4	4.44	0.2	1.83	0.6	6.26
4	"Maniak"	October 28, 2022	0.4	4.63	0.3	1.87	0.7	6.50
5	"Unraveling"	November 4, 2022	0.4	5.09	0.3	1.83	0.7	6.92
6	"Checkmate"	November 18, 2022	0.5	5.00	—N/a	—N/a	—N/a	—N/a
7	"Sequel"	December 2, 2022	0.4	4.83	—N/a	—N/a	—N/a	—N/a
8	"Guacaine"	December 9, 2022	0.4	4.93	—N/a	—N/a	—N/a	—N/a
9	"Pariah"	January 6, 2023	0.5	5.42	0.3	2.07	0.8	7.49
10	"Witness"	January 13, 2023	0.5	5.53	0.3	1.82	0.8	7.35
11	"Atonement"	January 20, 2023	0.5	5.54	0.3	1.82	0.7	7.36
12	"Addicted"	February 3, 2023	0.5	5.55	—N/a	—N/a	—N/a	—N/a
13	"Lion's Share"	February 10, 2023	0.5	5.77	—N/a	—N/a	—N/a	—N/a
14	"Gut Punch"	February 24, 2023	0.3	4.69	—N/a	—N/a	—N/a	—N/a
15	"To Protect & to Serve"	March 3, 2023	0.4	5.08	—N/a	—N/a	—N/a	—N/a
16	"Blowback"	March 10, 2023	0.4	5.16	—N/a	—N/a	—N/a	—N/a
17	"Stockholm"	March 31, 2023	0.4	4.88	—N/a	—N/a	—N/a	—N/a
18	"Genesis"	April 7, 2023	0.4	5.09	—N/a	—N/a	—N/a	—N/a
19	"Bunkies"	April 21, 2023	0.4	5.36	—N/a	—N/a	—N/a	—N/a
20	"All that Glitters"	May 5, 2023	0.3	4.71	—N/a	—N/a	—N/a	—N/a
21	"Forget Shorty"	May 12, 2023	0.4	4.45	—N/a	—N/a	—N/a	—N/a
22	"Legacy"	May 19, 2023	0.4	4.65	—N/a	—N/a	—N/a	—N/a

=== Season 7 ===
Viewership and ratings per episode of List of S.W.A.T. (2017 TV series) episodes
No.	Title	Air date	Rating (18–49)	Viewers (millions)
1	"The Promise"	February 16, 2024	0.5/6	5.24
2	"Peace Talks"	February 23, 2024	0.4/5	4.96
3	"Good for Nothing"	March 1, 2024	0.4/6	5.02
4	"Spare Parts"	March 8, 2024	0.4/5	4.73
5	"End of the Road"	March 8, 2024	0.3/4	4.45
6	"Escape"	March 15, 2024	0.4/5	4.70
7	"Last Call"	April 5, 2024	0.3/4	4.49
8	"Family Man"	April 12, 2024	0.4/5	4.61
9	"Honeytrap"	April 19, 2024	0.4/5	4.46
10	"SNAFU"	April 26, 2024	0.3/3	4.66
11	"Whispers"	May 3, 2024	0.3/4	4.37
12	"Allegiance"	May 10, 2024	0.3/4	4.30
13	"Twenty Squad"	May 17, 2024	0.3/5	4.39

=== Season 8 ===
Viewership and ratings per episode of List of S.W.A.T. (2017 TV series) episodes
No.	Title	Air date	Rating/share (18–49)	Viewers (millions)	DVR (18–49)	DVR viewers (millions)	Total (18–49)	Total viewers (millions)	Ref.
1	"Vanished"	October 18, 2024	0.3/4	4.05	0.1	1.37	0.4	5.41	
2	"Gang Unit"	October 25, 2024	0.3/3	3.84	0.2	1.48	0.4	5.31	
3	"Life"	November 1, 2024	0.3/5	4.55	0.2	1.34	0.5	5.89	
4	"The Sepulveda Protocol"	November 8, 2024	0.3/4	4.25	0.2	1.36	0.5	5.62	
5	"Human Interest"	November 15, 2024	0.3/4	4.13	0.2	1.41	0.5	5.54	
6	"Hot Button"	November 22, 2024	0.4/5	4.62	0.2	1.40	0.6	6.02	
7	"Home"	December 6, 2024	0.3/4	4.33	0.2	1.36	0.5	5.69	
8	"Left of Boom"	December 13, 2024	0.3/6	4.37	0.2	1.42	0.5	5.79	
9	"Open Season"	January 31, 2025	0.2/4	3.14	0.2	1.75	0.4	4.83	
10	"The Heights"	February 7, 2025	0.3/4	3.47	0.2	1.58	0.4	5.05	
11	"AMBER"	February 14, 2025	0.2/3	3.41	0.2	1.64	0.4	5.06	
12	"Deep Cover"	February 21, 2025	0.3/5	3.48	0.2	1.61	0.5	5.10	
13	"High Ground"	February 28, 2025	0.3/5	3.67	0.2	1.47	0.5	5.14	
14	"The Santa Clara"	March 7, 2025	0.3/4	3.20	0.2	1.69	0.4	4.89	
15	"Hostages"	March 14, 2025	0.3/5	3.69	0.2	1.59	0.4	5.01	
16	"Hail Mary"	April 4, 2025	0.2/3	3.16	0.2	1.72	0.4	4.85	
17	"The Enemy Within"	April 11, 2025	0.3/4	3.53	—N/a	—N/a	—N/a	—N/a	
18	"Exploited"	April 18, 2025	0.3/4	3.50	—N/a	—N/a	—N/a	—N/a	
19	"Run to Ground"	May 2, 2025	0.2/4	2.82	—N/a	—N/a	—N/a	—N/a	
20	"Devil Dog"	May 9, 2025	0.2/2	2.83	—N/a	—N/a	—N/a	—N/a	
21	"Ride or Die"	May 16, 2025	0.2/3	3.16	—N/a	—N/a	—N/a	—N/a	
22	"Return to Base"	May 16, 2025	0.2/3	3.02	—N/a	—N/a	—N/a	—N/a	
