= NCIS: Los Angeles season 3 =

NCIS: Los Angeles
- Season 3
- Season 3 U.S. DVD cover
- Starring: Chris O'Donnell; Daniela Ruah; Eric Christian Olsen; Barrett Foa; Renée Felice Smith; Linda Hunt; LL Cool J
- No. of episodes: 24

Release
- Original network: CBS
- Original release: September 20, 2011 – May 15, 2012

Season chronology
- ← Previous; Season 2 Next → Season 4

The third season of NCIS: Los Angeles an American police procedural drama television series, originally aired on CBS from September 20, 2011 to May 15, 2012. The season was produced by Shane Brennan Productions and CBS Television Studios, with Shane Brennan as showrunner and executive producer. A total of 24 episodes were produced. A fictional crossover with Hawaii Five-0 occurred during the season in episode twenty-one.

The season introduces Miguel Ferrer as NCIS Assistant Director Owen Granger.

NCIS: Los Angeles ranked #7 with a total of 16.01 million viewers for the 2011–12 U.S. network television season.

== Cast and characters ==
=== Main ===
- Chris O'Donnell as G. Callen, NCIS Senior Special Agent (SSA) of the Office of Special Projects (O.S.P.) in Los Angeles
- Daniela Ruah as Kensi Blye, NCIS Junior Special Agent
- Eric Christian Olsen as Marty Deeks, L.A.P.D. Detective/Liaison to NCIS
- Barrett Foa as Eric Beale, NCIS Technical Operator
- Renée Felice Smith as Nell Jones, NCIS Junior Field Agent and Intelligence Analyst
- Linda Hunt as Henrietta Lange, NCIS Supervisory Special Agent and Operations Manager
- LL Cool J as Sam Hanna, NCIS Senior Agent, Second in Command

=== Recurring ===
- Rocky Carroll as Leon Vance, NCIS Director stationed in Washington, D.C.
- Brian Avers as Mike Renko, NCIS Special Agent and former member of the O.S.P. and Callen's team
- Vyto Ruginis as Arkady Kolcheck
- Claire Forlani as Lauren Hunter, NCIS Senior Special Agent
- Peter Cambor as Nate Getz, NCIS Special Agent
- Ella Thomas as Jada Khaled
- Miguel Ferrer as Owen Granger, New NCIS Assistant Director
- Laura Harring as Julia Feldman

=== Special Guests Stars ===
- Scott Caan as Danny "Danno" Williams
- Daniel Dae Kim as Chin Ho Kelly

== Episodes ==
No. overall	No. in season	Title	Directed by	Written by	Original release date	Prod. code	US viewers (millions)
49	1	"Lange, H."	Tony Wharmby	Shane Brennan	September 20, 2011	301	16.71
The Special Projects team travels to Romania to search for Hetty, while delving into the history of the Comescu crime family, and their connection to Callen. Hetty confronts Alexa, matriarch of the Comescu family, and it is revealed that Callen's grandfather was an OSS agent who killed several members of the family; the Comescus retaliated, killing his mother, but leaving Callen and his sister alive. Meanwhile, Eric and Nell discover that Lauren Hunter, the Office of Special Projects Operations Manager, is a member of the Comescus. It is ultimately revealed that Hunter assumed the identity of Ilena Vadim - a member of the family who distanced herself from them - to infiltrate the Comescu family; the other members of the team are unaware of her exact allegiance until she kills Alexa and retrieves a laptop from the Comescu beach house. The episode ends in a cliffhanger with the other characters realizing that Hetty has been shot by Alexa. She then collapses to the ground, her fate unknown. Cast: Cristine Rose, Craig Robert Young
50	2	"Cyber Threat"	Dennis Smith	R. Scott Gemmill	September 27, 2011	302	16.26
The NCIS team has to join forces with the NSA to find the creator and controller of a software program linked to a cyber attack against the Department of Defense. Meanwhile, Callen continues searching for more information about his past. The episode ends with Callen confronting Hetty about her knowledge of his past and family. Cast: Bridget Regan, Nathan Gamble, Jordan Belfi
51	3	"Backstopped"	Terrence O'Hara	Dave Kalstein & Shane Brennan	October 4, 2011	303	14.78
Operations Manager Hunter rotates the investigative partnerships during an investigation into the death of a Marine who died during an explosion.
52	4	"Deadline"	Kate Woods	Gil Grant	October 11, 2011	304	15.40
As Hetty returns to work the team investigates a death tied to the Libyan resistance movement. Cast: Tony Amendola, Sheetal Sheth, Sam Golzari
53	5	"Sacrifice"	John Peter Kousakis	Joseph C. Wilson	October 18, 2011	305	15.35
The LAPD calls upon the NCIS team when a raid links a Mexican drug cartel to a wanted terrorist affiliated with al-Qaeda where it is discovered that the terrorist plans to sell a captured MQ-9 Reaper to the cartel. Meanwhile, Sam's most prized possession is stolen. Cast: America Olivo, Danny Nucci
54	6	"Lone Wolf"	James Whitmore Jr.	Christina M. Kim	October 25, 2011	306	15.89
After a former Navy intelligence officer is murdered, Hetty contacts a former co-worker when the NCIS team uncovers a threat to a pipeline in Afghanistan. The victim was killed to prevent disclosure of the attack. Cast: Scott Paulin, Robin Thomas, Craig McLachlan, Meredith Scott Lynn, Charles Parnell
55	7	"Honor"	Tony Wharmby	Jordana Lewis Jaffe & R. Scott Gemmill	November 1, 2011	307	15.52
When a Marine that was dishonorably discharged is accused of murder and claims he was framed, it is up to NCIS to figure out the truth. Cast: Yuji Okumoto, Drew Fuller, Ron Yuan
56	8	"Greed"	Jan Eliasberg	Frank Military	November 8, 2011	308	15.66
When a Navy ID is found on a dead body tied to a hazardous material smuggling case, NCIS is granted permission to investigate in Mexico and asked to help locate the missing materials. The episode ends with Sam heading off to Sudan to work alongside a CIA task force. Cast: Sherman Augustus, Joe Nunez, Julia Whelan, Hemky Madera
57	9	"Betrayal"	Karen Gaviola	Frank Military	November 15, 2011	309	15.15
After Sam's undercover mission in Sudan turns deadly with a body presumably matching that of Sam's description, Callen heads off to Sudan to discover the truth and to track down Sam before it's too late. Meanwhile, back in Los Angeles, the NCIS team searches for clues in regards to the case but things go wrong when Sam's cover is blown, forcing Callen and Sam into a fight for their lives. Cast: Ella Thomas, Anslem Richardson, Jack Stehlin, Tongayi Chirisa, Kelly Smith
58	10	"The Debt"	Steven DePaul	Dave Kalstein	November 22, 2011	310	14.09
When Deeks shoots an unarmed man during a joint NCIS/LAPD operation, LAPD blames NCIS for ruining the operation and breaks ties with NCIS, forcing Hetty to eliminate Deeks's liaison position. However, the shooting was a ruse enabling Deeks to return to LAPD so that a mole in LAPD could be identified. With the mole eventually identified, Deeks returns to his work with NCIS. Cast: Patrick St. Esprit, Cyrus Farmer, Mary Page Keller, Michael Weston
59	11	"Higher Power"	Kevin Bray	Joe Sachs	December 13, 2011	311	16.40
During the middle of the holidays and the distractions they cause, the team is tasked with finding the thieves who stole an experimental electronic device with enough power to destroy half of Los Angeles. Cast: Troy Evans, Arlen Escarpeta, Jackson Davis, Ian Nelson, Leland Orser
60	12	"The Watchers"	Tony Wharmby	R. Scott Gemmill	January 3, 2012	312	17.08
When a researcher with the Department of Defense is found dead, Nell must put her high IQ to the test when she goes undercover as his replacement. Meanwhile, Hetty's ability to lead the team is questioned by the new NCIS Assistant Director, Owen Granger. Cast: Erik Palladino, Sean McGowan
61	13	"Exit Strategy"	Dennis Smith	Gregory Weidman	January 10, 2012	313	16.60
The team must find the person behind an ambush on a vehicle carrying Jada Khaled to save her and their case; Sam must face Jada for the first time since Sudan. The humanitarian agent from their previous mission was revealed to have been forced to ambush Jada Khaled after members of a French company who possessed ties with the Sudanese dictator kidnapped his family and threatened to kill them if he didn't kill her. Cast: Lothaire Bluteau, Ella Thomas, Anslem Richardson
62	14	"Partners"	Eric Laneuville	Gil Grant & Dave Kalstein	February 7, 2012	314	16.27
The team investigates a hijacking when a package from a state department van goes missing. Meanwhile, Callen and Sam celebrate five years as partners. Cast: Currie Graham, Alana de la Garza, Basil Wallace
63	15	"Crimeleon"	Terrence O'Hara	Frank Military	February 14, 2012	315	16.15
The team investigates the murder of two businessmen and later finds out that a spy/agent named Chameleon who can take on any personality or facade he likes is responsible for the killings. When the Interpol Agent the team was working with is murdered, Granger takes over the case, forcing the team to report to him while still resenting his involvement. But despite their best efforts, Chameleon manages to evade them but not before calling Callen from an unknown location and then telling the NCIS Special Agent that he's going to kill him. Later, under pressure from both Hetty and Callen, Granger finally tells them the reason for him coming to Los Angeles: he's here to catch a killer and the camera then shows him looking over at Kensi, suggesting it might have something to do with her. Cast: Eric Etebari, MacKenzie Mauzy, Adam Huss, Peter Stormare, Christopher Lambert
64	16	"Blye, K."	Jonathan Frakes	Joseph C. Wilson	February 21, 2012	316	15.47
Kensi is taken into custody by Assistant Director Granger when various Marines from her deceased father's unit end up dead in various car accidents. Granger reveals Donald Blye's unit was actually a Black Ops Hit Team and that everyone in the unit has been killed, with the only common link between them being Kensi. However as Callen and the team investigate to try and clear their friend's name, they uncover Granger's ties to the unit and begin to suspect that he is the true killer. The episode ends in a cliffhanger with Kensi being shot by an unknown sniper and it is not yet known if she is alive, having been injured by the bullet, or dead. Cast: Gregg Henry, Samantha Smith
65	17	"Blye, K., Part 2"	Terrence O'Hara	Dave Kalstein	February 28, 2012	317	15.85
Kensi is injured, but survives the shot from the sniper and goes rogue. Callen & co discover that Granger fled the scene, and they must find him and get answers whilst Kensi continues the chase for the killer responsible for her father's death as she resolves to solve the case once and for all. Cast: Spencer Garrett, Jes Macallan
66	18	"The Dragon and the Fairy"	Tony Wharmby	Joe Sachs	March 20, 2012	318	16.17
The team investigates a shooting outside the Vietnamese Consulate just before an international conference at the venue that the Secretary of the Navy is scheduled to attend. But they soon find evidence suggesting that an illegal sweatshop might be a cover for a human trafficking ring or terrorists. Cast: Dan Lauria, Sumalee Montano, François Chau, James Chen
67	19	"Vengeance"	James Whitmore Jr.	Frank Military	March 27, 2012	319	14.75
A Navy Intel Officer is found dead, and all evidence points to a team of Navy SEALs who are about to depart for a hostage rescue mission. Sam is chosen to interrogate the group which may compromise the mission. Cast: Gino Anthony Pesi, Brian Patrick Wade, Blake Cooper Griffin, Eltony Williams
68	20	"Patriot Acts"	Dennis Smith	Jordana Lewis Jaffe	April 10, 2012	320	12.86
When a former Marine is suspected of creating a chemical bomb found in a vehicle, Nate Getz returns to Los Angeles and the team must work together with the FBI to track down and stop a domestic terrorist. Cast: David Furr, Eric Jungmann, Brea Grant, Michael Hyatt, Pierrino Mascarino, Anna Wood, Christel Khalil
69	21	"Touch of Death"	Tony Wharmby	Michele Fazekas & Tara Butters & R. Scott Gemmill	May 1, 2012	321	15.21
Detectives Danny "Danno" Williams and Chin Ho Kelly of the Hawaii Five-0 task force arrive in Los Angeles to help Callen, Sam and the Office of Special Projects find and stop Jarrod Prodeman, a disgraced doctor carrying several vials of smallpox, capable of wiping out half the world's population. They eventually find and capture Prodeman, who reveals he has already sold the vials to a Doctor Rachel Holden, who is nowhere to be found. Research soon finds that Holden, who believes that the Earth's population has grown too huge in the last thousand years, is planning on unleashing the smallpox to cut the population in half so that the Earth itself could recover. Cast: Rob Benedict as Jarrod Prodeman, Laura Regan, Cynthia Addai-Robinson. Note: This episode concludes a crossover event that begins on Hawaii Five-0 season 2 episode 21.
70	22	"Neighborhood Watch"	Robert Florio	Christina M. Kim	May 8, 2012	322	14.56
Deeks and Kensi go undercover as a married couple to catch a Russian sleeper agent in the neighborhood. Through many suspects and an unexpected twist for Deeks and Kensi, they eventually capture the agent. Also, Kensi and Deeks share a kiss to protect their cover. Cast: Alaina Huffman, Brianne Davis, Scott Elrod, J.P. Manoux, George Gerdes, D.C. Douglas
71	23	"Sans Voir (Part I)"	John Peter Kousakis	Gil Grant	May 15, 2012	323	15.19
The Chameleon lures Callen and the rest of the team into a deadly mind-game with things becoming even more personal for the team when both Agents Mike Renko and Lauren Hunter are killed. Cast: Christopher Lambert, Sarayu Rao, Eyal Podell, Brent Briscoe, Scott MacDonald, William Gregory Lee, Dustin Ingram, Scott MacArthur
72	24	"Sans Voir (Part II)"	Terrence O'Hara	Shane Brennan	May 15, 2012	324	15.19
The Chameleon's mind games continue and things heat up when the team discovers an innocent man's life is at stake. The episode ends with Callen being arrested by the LAPD after killing the Chameleon in revenge for Renko and Hunter's deaths. At the same time, Hetty is seen leaving a resignation letter for Owen Granger on her desk, suggesting that she fully intends to leave OSP for good due to the incident. Cast: Christopher Lambert, Eyal Podell

== Production ==
=== Development ===
NCIS: Los Angeles was renewed for a third season on May 17, 2011.

=== Crossover ===
The season featured a crossover with Hawaii Five-0. The event took place in the form of a two-part crossover. Chris O'Donnell and LL Cool J appeared as G. Callen and Sam Hanna in the twenty-first episode of the Hawaii Five-0 second season episode titled "Pa Make Loa" ("Touch of Death") on April 30, 2012. In the second part, Scott Caan and Daniel Dae Kim appeared in the third season episode "Touch of Death" which aired on May 1, 2012.

== Broadcast ==
Season three of NCIS: Los Angeles premiered on September 20, 2011.

== Reception ==
=== Ratings ===
Viewership and ratings per episode of NCIS: Los Angeles season 3
No.	Title	Air date	Rating/share (18–49)	Viewers (millions)	DVR (18–49)	DVR viewers (millions)	Total (18–49)	Total viewers (millions)
1	"Lange, H."	September 20, 2011	3.6/9	16.71	—N/a	2.38	—N/a	19.09
2	"Cyber Threat"	September 27, 2011	3.6/9	16.26	1.0	2.72	4.6	18.98
3	"Backstopped"	October 4, 2011	3.4/9	14.78	1.0	2.61	4.4	17.39
4	"Deadline"	October 11, 2011	3.3/8	15.40	0.9	2.69	4.2	18.09
5	"Sacrifice"	October 18, 2011	3.4/8	15.35	0.9	2.40	4.3	17.75
6	"Lone Wolf"	October 25, 2011	3.7/9	15.89	0.9	2.59	4.6	18.48
7	"Honor"	November 1, 2011	3.4/9	15.52	1.0	2.63	4.4	18.15
8	"Greed"	November 8, 2011	3.4/8	15.66	0.9	2.60	4.3	18.26
9	"Betrayal"	November 15, 2011	3.4/8	15.15	—N/a	2.59	—N/a	17.74
10	"The Debt"	November 22, 2011	3.0/8	14.09	0.9	2.63	3.9	16.72
11	"Higher Power"	December 13, 2011	3.0/8	16.40	1.1	2.82	4.1	19.22
12	"The Watchers"	January 3, 2012	3.5/8	17.08	1.0	2.70	4.5	19.81
13	"Exit Strategy"	January 10, 2012	3.3/8	16.60	1.0	2.76	4.3	19.36
14	"Partners"	February 7, 2012	3.1/8	16.27	—N/a	3.02	—N/a	19.29
15	"Crimeleon"	February 14, 2012	3.2/8	16.15	1.0	2.66	4.2	18.81
16	"Blye, K."	February 21, 2012	2.7/7	15.47	0.9	2.50	3.6	17.97
17	"Blye, K., Part 2"	February 28, 2012	3.1/8	15.85	0.8	2.36	3.9	18.21
18	"The Dragon and the Fairy"	March 20, 2012	2.8/8	16.17	1.0	2.70	3.8	18.87
19	"Vengeance"	March 27, 2012	3.0/8	14.75	0.8	2.37	3.8	17.12
20	"Patriot Acts"	April 10, 2012	2.4/6	12.86	1.0	2.81	3.4	15.67
21	"Touch of Death"	May 1, 2012	3.0/8	15.21	1.2	3.31	4.2	18.52
22	"Neighborhood Watch"	May 8, 2012	3.0/8	14.56	—N/a	2.71	—N/a	17.27
23	"Sans Voir (Part I)"	May 15, 2012	3.0/8	15.19	1.1	3.03	4.1	18.22
24	"Sans Voir (Part II)"	May 15, 2012	3.0/8	15.19	1.1	3.03	4.1	18.22

== Home video release ==
NCIS: Los Angeles: The Third Season
Set details	Special features	
Discs: 6; Episodes: 24; Runtime: 1,029 minutes	Deleted scenes: "Lange, H.", "Betrayal", "The Debt," and "Blye, K. Part 2"; Raise the Roof; Dishing... with Barrett and Renee; Aligning the Stars; Carmageddon; Commentary by Daniela Ruah and Eric Christian Olsen on "Neighborhood Watch"; Investigating Season 3; Surf and Turf; "Pa Make Loa"	
DVD release dates
Region 1	Region 2	Region 4
August 21, 2012	August 27, 2012	August 1, 2012
