= Blye, K., Part 2 =

- NCIS: Los Angeles episode
- Episode no.: Season 3 Episode 17
- Directed by: Terrence O'Hara
- Written by: Dave Kalstein
- Original air date: February 28, 2012

Guest appearances
- Miguel Ferrer as NCIS Assistant Director Owen Granger; Laura Harring as Julia Feldman; Spencer Garrett as Peter Clairmont; Handsome Guy as Adam Grimes; Jes Macallan as Megan Stevens; Pamela Shaddock as Bank Manager; Matthew Grant Godbey as LAPD Detective Dan Evans; Gregg Henry as Alex Harris

Episode chronology
← Previous "Blye, K"	Next → "The Dragon and the Fairy"
- NCIS: Los Angeles season 3

"Blye, K., Part 2" is the 17th episode of the third season of the American crime drama television series NCIS: Los Angeles, and the 65th episode overall. It originally aired on CBS in the United States on February 28, 2012. The episode was written by Dave Kalstein and directed by Terrence O'Hara, and was seen by 15.85 million viewers in its original American broadcast.

== Plot ==
Kensi survives being shot by a sniper thanks to body armor that resulted in her only suffering from a cracked rib. She follows the sniper who is now believed to be the man who killed her father. She gets rid of her phone as she wants to go after her father's killer on her own without the help of her NCIS colleagues. At HQ, the OSP team discover Granger has gone off the radar and begin to suspect him to be the killer as he was in the same unit as Donald Blye and Harris, codenamed 'Oscar Sierra'. Kensi finds she is being followed but surprise attacks the driver and steals the car, whose Satellite Navigation System leads her to a house where she sees a man and a woman talking. Deeks shows up to bring her in which she refuses. She tells Deeks to look after the woman who is later revealed to be Kensi's estranged mother, Julia Feldman.

After Eric and Nell find footage of Granger fleeing the shooting, Callen and Sam discover him in Kensi's ransacked apartment, and bring him to Hetty in the NCIS OSP Boatshed for answers. Granger then comes clean and reveals he had two suspects all along: Kensi Blye and Peter Clairmont, the Commanding Officer of Oscar Sierra who died in a car crash in 2006, but upon closer inspection of the files Granger concluded the crash was staged, and that Clairmont is actually alive and faked his death because he killed Donald Blye. Callen & Sam realise that in 2006, Kensi Blye joined NCIS and started investigating her father's unit, which spooked Clairmont when she began getting close and forced him to start killing off Oscar Sierra team members.

Granger calls Kensi and reveals to all that Oscar Sierra was responsible for the death of Brad Stevens, an American reporter. Kensi realises that the man she saw talking to her mother was Clairmont, and whilst Kensi goes off to speak with Brad Stevens's daughter, Deeks nervously explains to Kensi's mother why he's there and brings her back to the boathouse where Callan and Hanna are surprised to see her. She explains the relationship between herself and Kensi. The woman Kensi speaks to is not the real person and it is a trap, Kensi kills the impostor, Anya Fournier and receives a call from Claremont, who taunts her into coming after him. The team discover the imposter worked as part of a team for Clairmont with Callen, Sam and Deeks soon discovering the real Megan Stevens, the daughter of Brad Stevens in a freezer, dead.

Kensi goes back to her mother's house and lures Clairmont and his team there whilst leaving a clue for Callen and the others to find her. A brutal fight ensues between her and Claremont as the two engage in hand-to-hand combat while Callen, Sam, Deeks and Granger engage in a gunfight against the four members of Clairmont's team. After a vicious and intense fight, Kensi wins but doesn't kill him, simply stating that he won't last long while implying that his injuries are so severe that there's a chance he'll die. As she turns her back on him, Claremont, seeking revenge uses the last ounce of his strength to produce his gun with the intention of shooting Kensi but Granger, having quickly spotted the move draws his own gun and shoots Claremont, killing him while also saving Kensi's life much to the shock and surprise of Callen, Sam and Deeks.

A tape is found containing evidence with the potential of convicting Claremont. Stevens's final story was going to be about Clairmont getting into a drunken fight and killing a civilian at a bar in Port-au-Prince, Haiti in 1997, which would've damaged Claremont's reputation, seen his cover being blown and destroyed his career, so he arranged for Stevens to be killed before the story could be finished. Kensi's father tried to warn the reporter but was killed for it. Granger reveals that Stevens was supposed to come to him for safety, but never made it; and this was his way of setting things right. Kensi is also given her father's sniper journal. The episode ends with Kensi sitting alone on a beach while reading a letter her father wrote to her in the journal. After she's finished, she visits her mother and finally makes peace with her.

== Production ==
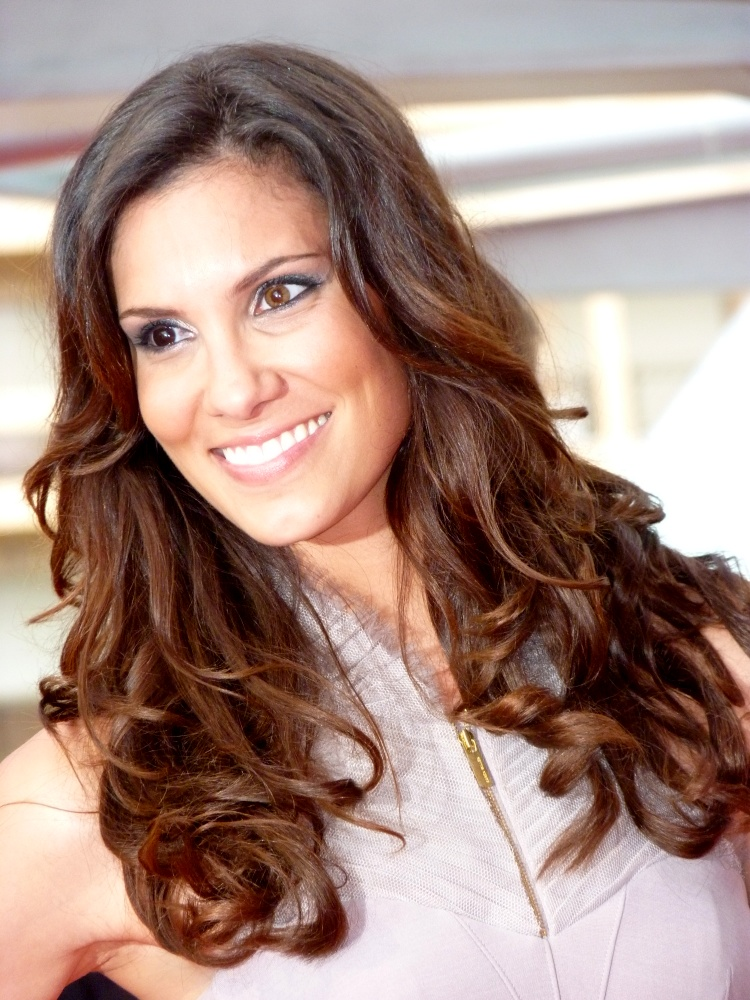
The episode centers around Daniela Ruah's character Kensi Blye.

"Blye, K., Part 2" is written by Dave Kalstein and directed by Terrence O'Hara. The episode is the second of a two-part arc centred on NCIS Special Agent Kensi Blye. According to Daniela Ruah, who portrays Kensi, "[Kensi is] determined to prove her dad’s death was a murder and not an accident. She wants to crack the case. But at the same time, she’s extremely emotionally attached to this case, which can cloud your judgment sometimes". The premise for the two-part arc is set up in Kensi's appearance on Hawaii Five-0 back in October 2011. "Something happened while she was there. That’s when the fuse was lit", say executive producer Shane Brennan. In connection with this, it's shown why Kensi joined NCIS. "It’s a very surprising reason, and it’s a very dangerous reason".

Miguel Ferrer is recurring as NCIS Assistant Director Owen Granger.

== Reception ==
"Blye, K., Part 2" was seen by 15.85 million live viewers following its broadcast on February 28, 2012, with a 9.9/15 share among all households, and 3.1/8 share among adults aged 18 to 49. A rating point represents one percent of the total number of television sets in American households, and a share means the percentage of television sets in use tuned to the program. In total viewers, "Blye, K., Part 2" came third, behind the original NCIS television series and American Idol.

Clara Day from TV Fanatic gave the episode 4.5 (out of 5) and stated that "until now, Kensi's past has been almost as big a secret as Callen and Sam's have been. We knew her father was a military man and she was curious about his death. She finally got the answers she has so desperately been searching for".
