= NCIS: Los Angeles season 9 =

NCIS: Los Angeles
- Season 9
- Season 9 U.S. DVD cover
- Starring: Chris O'Donnell; Daniela Ruah; Eric Christian Olsen; Barrett Foa; Renée Felice Smith; Nia Long; Linda Hunt; LL Cool J
- No. of episodes: 24

Release
- Original network: CBS
- Original release: October 1, 2017 – May 20, 2018

Season chronology
- ← Previous; Season 8 Next → Season 10

The ninth season of NCIS: Los Angeles premiered on October 1, 2017 on CBS for the 2017–18 television season, and concluded on May 20, 2018. The season contained 24 episodes and the series’ 200th episode. Nia Long joined the cast as Shay Mosley for the ninth season after Miguel Ferrer's death.

The ninth season ranked 23 with a total of 10.50 million viewers.

== Cast and characters ==
=== Main ===
- Chris O'Donnell as Grisha "G." Callen, NCIS Special Agent in Charge (SAC)
- Daniela Ruah as Kensi Blye, NCIS Junior Special Agent
- Eric Christian Olsen as Marty Deeks, L.A.P.D. Detective and Liaison to NCIS
- Barrett Foa as Eric Beale, NCIS Technical Operator
- Renée Felice Smith as Nell Jones, NCIS Special Agent and Intelligence Analyst
- Nia Long as Shay Mosley, NCIS Executive Assistant Director for Pacific Operations (EADPAC)
- Linda Hunt as Henrietta Lange, NCIS Supervisory Special Agent (SSA) and Operations Manager
- LL Cool J as Sam Hanna, NCIS Senior Special Agent, Second in Command

=== Recurring ===
- Vyto Ruginis as Arkady Kolcheck
- Bar Paly as Anastasia "Anna" Kolcheck, an ATF Agent and Callen's girlfriend.
- John M. Jackson as Rear Admiral A. J. Chegwidden, JAGC, USN (Ret.)
- Andrea Bordeaux as Harley Hidoko, NCIS Special Agent and Executive Assistant to the EADPAC.
- Jeff Kober as Harris Keane
- Pamela Reed as Roberta Deeks, Deeks' mother.
- Daniel J. Travanti as Nikita Aleksandr Reznikov / Garrison, Callen's father
- Ravil Isyanov as Anatoli Kirkin
- Patrick St. Esprit as LAPD Lieutenant Roger Bates
- Karina Logue as LAPD Detective Ellen Whiting
- Max Martini as Arlo Turk
- Bobby Lee as Rio Syamsundin
- Drew Waters as Brian Bush, FBI Agent
- Malese Jow as Jennifer Kim
- David Paul Olsen as Tom Olsen, Sam’s former SEAL buddy

=== Notable guest stars ===
- Marsha Thomason as Secret Service Special Agent Nicole DeChamps
- Mariela Garriga as Pietra Rey
- Carl Lumbly as Charles Langston
- James Handy as Former NIS Operative George Nelson
- James Remar as Sterling Bridges
- Bobby Lee as Rio Syamsundin / Jeff Carol
- Ashley Spillers as Homeland Security Specialist Sydney Jones
- Kieu Chinh as Kim Nguyen
- David Huynh as Bartender

== Episodes ==
No. overall	No. in season	Title	Directed by	Written by	Original release date	Prod. code	U.S. viewers (millions)
193	1	"Party Crashers"	John Peter Kousakis	R. Scott Gemmill	October 1, 2017	901	8.95
As Hetty turns in retirement papers and disappears, Shay Mosley comes to Los Angeles to oversee the team and makes staffing changes; Sam insists that Callen find a new partner. Meanwhile, the team investigate the death of a South Korean agent investigating North Korea's missile program.
194	2	"Se Murio El Payaso"	Rick Tunell	Kyle Harimoto	October 8, 2017	825	8.46
When the daughter of a notorious counterfeiter arrives in Los Angeles, Sam is sent undercover as a financier, while Callen partners with Anna to track the family's latest scheme. Hetty is shown in Ho Chi Minh City, Vietnam bribing a prison guard to allow her to talk to a Harris Kaine.
195	3	"Assets"	Tawnia McKiernan	Kyle Harimoto	October 15, 2017	902	8.65
During the murder investigation of a Navy Lieutenant on leave in Los Angeles, the NCIS team uncovers classified surveillance briefs she smuggled into the city that may have been sold to a foreign buyer. Meanwhile, Sam decides to sell his house.
196	4	"Plain Sight"	Dennis Smith	Joseph C. Wilson	October 22, 2017	903	8.18
After weapons with a $1 million street value are stolen, the team tracks the evidence to a wealthy charity event, prompting Mosley to be added to the guest list with Callen and Sam as her security detail.
197	5	"Mountebank"	Terrence O'Hara	Jordana Lewis Jaffe	October 29, 2017	904	7.50
icon
198	6	"Can I Get a Witness?"	James Hanlon	Chad Mazero	November 5, 2017	826	8.03
icon
199	7	"The Silo"	James Whitmore Jr.	Frank Military	November 12, 2017	905	7.86
After an Air Force captain Kensi dated a decade ago breaches a missile launch facility, she is transported to the location to help thwart the use of nuclear weapons.
200	8	"This Is What We Do"	John Peter Kousakis	R. Scott Gemmill	November 19, 2017	906	6.95
When a group of migrants and Border Patrol officers are slaughtered near Camp Pendleton, the team discovers that the killers are there for one of their old enemies; Nell must work with her bossy older sister Sydney, a Homeland Security analyst.
201	9	"Fool Me Twice"	Benny Boom	Andrew Bartels	November 26, 2017	907	7.64
icon
202	10	"Forasteira"	Eric A. Pot	Erin Broadhurst	December 10, 2017	908	7.53
The team tracks a highly-skilled assailant Pietra Rey determined to avenge her father's death by killing a Brazilian diplomat. Meanwhile, Deeks helps Guy, his mother's boyfriend, with a theft.
203	11	"All Is Bright"	Ruba Nadda	Chad Mazero	December 17, 2017	909	7.21
icon
204	12	"Under Pressure"	Diana C. Valentine	Joe Sachs	January 7, 2018	911	7.87
icon
205	13	"Các Tù Nhân"	James Hanlon	R. Scott Gemmill	January 14, 2018	910	9.12
After being captured while ransoming her Operation Sunrise teammate Harris Keane from a Vietnamese prison, Dang auctions Hetty for secrets from her long espionage career. After Eric's dream, he and Nell use Hetty's gifts, The Red Badge of Courage and a red-fluorescing flashlight, to highlight clues, "Failed, Action, Skin," that Hidoko recognizes as what3words coordinates for Ho Chi Minh City. Resisting interrogation by Spencer Allen, claiming to be with the U.S. State Department, Hetty feigns insanity and self-induces palilalia, but Allen shoots Keane, wounding him. Callen and Hanna pressure smuggler Billy Van for information. Eric and Nell discover Hetty's teammates A. J. Chegwidden and Charles Langston are already searching Vietnam, but they quickly leave the bar when Deeks video-chats through a woman's phone. When Dang threatens Keane with a starving Bengal tiger, Hetty relents, agreeing to talk. Mosely wonders, "who took that photo" of Hetty's teammates. Deducing Hetty's purpose, Callen questions George Nelson, a former NIS operative. Mosley books them a flight to Vietnam. Hetty stalls, telling Allen about "Cold War folklore" when spies broke fake molars with cyanide capsules after capture. Trying to prevent Hetty's "suicide," Allen's ear is bitten off by Hetty, who laughs. To be continued... Note: "Các Tù Nhân" is Vietnamese for "The Prisoners."
206	14	"Goodbye, Vietnam"	John Peter Kousakis	R. Scott Gemmill	March 11, 2018	912	8.03
A one-eyed Vietnamese man with sunglasses, an old enemy, buys Hetty from the black-market smuggler Dang. Ho Chi Minh City: A bartender recalls seeing Hetty; the waitress provides her teammates' satphone number, which Eric traces to a hotel, but Chegwidden, Langston and Sterling Bridges are already gone. Nell's overbearing older sister, Homeland Security Specialist Sydney Jones, helps search Hetty's case files for clues. To emotionally torture Hetty, Dang claims Harris Keane died. From Hetty's Vietnam alias "Maggie" they find mail to Kim Nguyen, who recalls, Harris shot Hetty's team photo, and suggests trying the Buddhist monastery. Tây Ninh: Brother Bao relays Hetty's message, and CIA Special Activities Division Officer Jeff Carol (alias Rio Syamsundin, from "Blame It on Rio") provides weapons, informing them about Dang's auction. They team with Chegwidden, Langston and Bridges, who procured a helicopter. Nell insists that Mosley asks SECNAV Davis for satellite surveillance. The team infiltrates Dang's camp, finding Keane alive. While Hetty is beaten, they burst in and kill Allen, the one-eyed man and his thugs. Hetty feeds Dang to the Bengal tiger he poached. Meanwhile, Nell confronts Sydney to stop calling her "Pogo" – a Nancy Drew, childhood, derogatory nickname.
207	15	"Liabilities"	Lily Mariye	Kyle Harimoto	March 18, 2018	913	8.02
The team's follow up on an old case leads them to Jennifer Kim, Granger's estranged daughter, who may be the only one able to help them prevent a rogue North Korean agent from causing a terrorist attack in Los Angeles. Hetty readjusts to the OSP office following her return, especially to Mosley. In the end of the episode, Callen and Sam learn that Granger is dead.
208	16	"Warrior of Peace"	Terence Nightingall	Andrew Bartels	March 25, 2018	914	8.58
After his father is taken into custody by the US state department, Callen risks his family, career and his life. With knowledge of a trade between Iran, NCIS works to find an alternative target when it's discovered that the kidnapping of two American freelance photographers was designed by the new head Russia's FSB. Callen's best hope to save his family from heartbreak and losing the trust of his half sister is Anatoli Kirken.
209	17	"The Monster"	Dennis Smith	Adam George Key & Frank Military	April 1, 2018	915	7.12
While investigating a missing person's case, the team work to dismantle a team who puts on a show for high paying voyeurs by killing victims and sewing together their limbs to create Frankensteinian corpses. Meanwhile, Mosley and Callen assist the ATF in attempting to arrest an arms dealer with a shocking tie to Mosley's past.
210	18	"Vendetta"	James Whitmore Jr.	Jordana Lewis Jaffe	April 8, 2018	916	8.14
icon
211	19	"Outside the Lines"	Suzanne Saltz	Joseph C. Wilson	April 22, 2018	917	7.57
icon
212	20	"Reentry"	Eric A. Pot	Lee A. Carlisle & Andrew Bartels	April 29, 2018	918	7.62
icon
213	21	"Where Everybody Knows Your Name"	Rick Tunell	Chad Mazero & Jordana Lewis Jaffe	May 6, 2018	919	7.71
NCIS works a joint task force with the FBI to investigate the death of a Marine who might have died due to a drug overdose.
214	22	"Venganza"	Yangzom Brauen	Erin Broadhurst & Kyle Harimoto	May 13, 2018	920	7.32
icon
215	23	"A Line in the Sand"	Frank Military	Frank Military	May 20, 2018	921	7.82
Following a gunfight that leaves Sam wounded, the team gains a lead on Spencer Williams, the arms dealer that has Mosley's son - and get concerned as Mosley threatens to cross the line to get her son back.
216	24	"Ninguna Salida"	John Peter Kousakis	Joe Sachs & R. Scott Gemmill	May 20, 2018	922	7.82
Despite several team members having grave reservations, NCIS travels to Mexico for a risky mission to locate and rescue Mosley's son. Also, after finding a mysterious pile of ash, the team starts to worry about Hidoko’s whereabouts.

== Ratings ==
No.	Episode	Air date	18–49 rating	Viewers (millions)
1	"Party Crashers"	October 1, 2017	1.3/4	8.95
2	"Se Murio El Payaso"	October 8, 2017	1.0/4	8.46
3	"Assets"	October 15, 2017	1.1/4	8.65
4	"Plain Sight"	October 22, 2017	1.1/3	8.18
5	"Mountebank"	October 29, 2017	0.8/3	7.50
6	"Can I Get a Witness?"	November 5, 2017	0.9/3	8.03
7	"The Silo"	November 12, 2017	0.9/3	7.86
8	"This Is What We Do"	November 19, 2017	0.7/2	6.95
9	"Fool Me Twice"	November 26, 2017	0.9/3	7.64
10	"Forasteira"	December 10, 2017	0.8/3	7.53
11	"All Is Bright"	December 17, 2017	0.9/3	7.21
12	"Under Pressure"	January 7, 2018	0.9/3	7.87
13	"Cac Tu Nhan"	January 14, 2018	1.1/4	9.12
14	"Goodbye, Vietnam"	March 11, 2018	0.9/3	8.03
15	"Liabilities"	March 18, 2018	0.9/3	8.02
16	"Warrior of Peace"	March 25, 2018	1.1/4	8.58
17	"The Monster"	April 1, 2018	0.8/3	7.12
18	"Vendetta"	April 8, 2018	0.9/3	8.14
19	"Outside the Lines"	April 22, 2018	0.8/3	7.57
20	"Reentry"	April 29, 2018	0.7/3	7.62
21	"Where Everybody Knows Your Name"	May 6, 2018	0.8/4	7.71
22	"Venganza"	May 13, 2018	0.8/3	7.32
23	"A Line in the Sand"	May 20, 2018	0.8/3	7.82
24	"Ninguna Salida"	May 20, 2018	0.8/3	7.82

== Home video release ==
NCIS: Los Angeles: The Ninth Season
Set details	Special features	
24 episodes; 6 disc; Media Format: Box set, Color, Dolby, NTSC, Subtitled, Widescreen; Run time: 16 hours and 58 minutes		
DVD release dates
Region 1	Region 2	Region 4
August 28, 2018	September 17, 2018	August 15, 2018
