= Touch of Death (crossover event) =

TV crossover between Hawaii Five-0 and NCIS: Los Angeles

- Lenkov-verse and NCIS crossover event
- Callen, Sam, Chin, and Danny recognize Prodeman outside the motel room in the second part of the crossover.
- Also known as: Pa Make Loa
- Written by: Michele Fazekas; Tara Butters; R. Scott Gemmill

Part 1: Hawaii Five-0
- Episode title: "Pa Make Loa"
- Episode no.: Season 2 Episode 21
- Directed by: Bryan Spicer
- Production code: 221
- Original air date: April 30, 2012

Episode chronology
← Previous "Haʻalele"	Next → "Ua Hopu"
- Hawaii Five-0 (2010 TV series) season 2

Part 2: NCIS: Los Angeles
- Episode title: "Touch of Death"
- Episode no.: Season 3 Episode 21
- Directed by: Tony Wharmby
- Production code: 321
- Original air date: May 1, 2012

Episode chronology
← Previous "Patriot Acts"	Next → "Neighborhood Watch"
- NCIS: Los Angeles season 3

Crossover chronology
- Preceded by: Ka Hakaka Maikaʻi
- Followed by: "True Colors" (NCIS: LA) "Flashlight" (Hawaii Five-0)

"Touch of Death" is a two-part crossover event between Hawaii Five-0 and NCIS: Los Angeles that aired on CBS. The event began on April 30, 2012, with the Hawaii Five-0 episode "Pa Make Loa" which is Hawaiian for "Touch of Death." It continued on May 1, 2012, with the NCIS: Los Angeles episode "Touch of Death". Scott Caan, Daniel Dae Kim, Chris O'Donnell, and LL Cool J appeared in both parts of the event as Danny Williams, Chin Ho Kelly, G. Callen, and Sam Hanna, respectively. The episodes both received mostly positive ratings and received high viewing figures in multiple countries.

== Cast and characters ==
=== Main ===
The following contains a list of actors receiving main billing in the crossover event:

Actor	Character	Episode	
Actor	Character	Hawaii Five-0	NCIS: Los Angeles
Alex O'Loughlin	Steve McGarrett	Main (Note: Despite being credited Alex O'Loughlin did not appear in the episode)	
Scott Caan	Danny Williams	Main	Guest
Daniel Dae Kim	Chin Ho Kelly	Main	Guest
Grace Park	Kono Kalakaua	Main	Un-credited archive footage.
Masi Oka	Max Bergman	Main	
Chris O'Donnell	G. Callen	Guest	Main
LL Cool J	Sam Hanna	Guest	Main
Linda Hunt	Henrietta "Hetty" Lange		Main
Daniela Ruah	Kensi Blye	(Note: Although not appearing in the crossover event Daniela Ruah previously appeared as a guest star in a previous crossover event with Hawaii Five-0, the event is mentioned in the second part of the crossover.)	Main
Eric Christian Olsen	Marty Deeks		Main
Barrett Foa	Eric Beale		Main
Renée Felice Smith	Nell Jones		Main

=== Guests ===
The following contains a list of notable guests appearing in the crossover event:

Actor	Character	Episode	
Actor	Character	Hawaii Five-0	NCIS: Los Angeles
Taylor Wily	Kamekona	Guest	
Brian Yang	Charlie Fong	Guest	
Craig Robert Young	Dracul Comescu	Guest	(Note: Although not appearing in the crossover event Craig Robert Young previously appeared as a recurring character in NCIS: Los Angeles)
Rob Benedict	Jarrod Prodeman	Un-credited photographs	Guest
Helen Eigenberg	Rachel Holden		Guest

== Plot ==
=== Part 1: "Pa Make Loa" ===
The episode opens with Bryan Palmer attempting to enter his ex-wife's house. The woman calls 911 and informs them of the situation. The Honolulu Police Department (HPD) arrive and confront the man who drops dead. When Hawaii Five-0 Task Force members Detective-Lieutenant Chin Ho Kelly, Detective-Sergeant Danny "Danno" Williams, and Officer Kono Kalakaua arrive, they are updated on the case and told that the man dropped dead of smallpox. Max informs them that he obtained the virus by injection. Kono finds a connection to Ken Tanner, a pharmaceutical trial manager. Chin and Danny examine Ken's home and find him dead in his car, crime scene techs examine the car and find fingerprints belonging to Dracul Comescu.

Danny finds out that Dracul is on the watchlist of the Naval Criminal Investigative Service Office of Special Projects division in Los Angeles. He calls Special Agents G. Callen and Sam Hanna who travel to Hawaii to assist in the case. Chin looks through Ken's financials and finds that he purchased medical supplies and had them delivered to a warehouse on Sand Island. Chin, Danny, Callen, and Sam all go to investigate and end up in a car chase with Dracul, however, they find that Dracul escaped. The four return to the warehouse and find a makeshift medical quarantine station with three dead victims murdered. The team finds several vials of the smallpox virus but also finds that several vials are missing. Chin and Danny interrogate Dracul's driver and are informed that Dracul took nine vials of the virus with him and plans on selling them at the International Market Place.

Callen locates Dracul and begins chasing him; upon confrontation Dracul pulls a vial from his pocket and is shot dead by Callen. The team recovers all nine vivals of smallpox and hand it off to the Centers for Disease Control. At Kamekona's shrimp truck Chin, Danny, Callen, and Sam enjoy shrimp; however, Danny receives a call from Kono who tells him that the vials recovered did not contain smallpox. Kono deducts that Dracul was crossed by his partner Doctor Jarrod Prodeman, and finds that he bought a ticket to Los Angeles. The other four head to Honolulu International Airport and find out that Jarrod traded tickets with another person so that Jarrod could take an earlier flight. Sam calls the NCIS office in Los Angeles and find that the plane Jarrod was on already landed an hour earlier.

=== Part 2: "Touch of Death" ===
As the plane begins to land in Los Angeles flight attendants grow suspicious when a passenger has not exited the bathroom. Upon opening the bathroom door they find the passenger dead of smallpox. Meanwhile, Callen, Sam, Chin, and Danny fly to Los Angeles to assist in finishing the case. NCIS Special Agents Kensi Blye and LAPD-NCIS Liaison Officer Detective Marty Deeks head to the airport and begin looking for Prodeman. Video surveillance however, showed that Prodeman already left the airport via taxi cab. The taxi cab company revealed that Prodeman was dropped off at a hotel. When Callen, Sam, Chin, and Danny search the room they find it empty. Afterwards, they find Prodeman outside and capture him. Upon interrogation Prodeman gives them the name Doctor Rachel Holden and says she was paying him off.

Kensi and Deeks search Holden's office and find her computer's hard drive, when they search it they find that she plans on infecting a group of people to reduce the earth's population because she believes it has grown too large. They also go through Holden's financials and find she purchased t-shirts to give away at a multi-national school festival. Putting the pieces together they find that she infected the t-shirts with smallpox.

Callen, Sam, Chin, and Danny head to the festival and find Holden. She attempts to drive away but they shoot out her tire and arrest her. In the process, they recover all missing vials of smallpox. Chin and Danny head back to Hawaii.

== Production ==
Hawaii Five-0 and NCIS: Los Angeles were previously set in the same universe when Daniela Ruah appeared as a guest star on Hawaii Five-0 (episode "Ka Hakaka Maikaʻi"). On January 11, 2012, it was announced that CBS would be airing a two-part crossover event between Hawaii Five-0 and NCIS: Los Angeles in May. Initially Chris O'Donnell and LL Cool J were set to appear in Hawaii Five-0 while Alex O'Loughlin and Scott Caan were set to appear in NCIS: Los Angeles However, on March 2, 2012, prior to the crossover's filming CBS announced that O'Loughlin would miss shooting some episodes of Hawaii Five-0 to seek drug treatment related to pain management medication prescribed after a shoulder injury. Due to this he was replaced by Daniel Dae Kim for the crossover event. The second episode of the crossover was the first to be filmed; while production on it was taking place the Hawaii Five-0 script was yet to be handed out. During filming NCIS L.A. creator stated "Crossovers are not easy to pull off when you're working in the same town, and when you've got the other show being shot a five-hour flight away, it's particularly challenging."

== Reception ==
=== Critical response ===
Jim Garner with TV Fanatic who reviewed the first part of the crossover said "it was a lot of fun having Hanna and Callen from NCIS: Los Angeles visit the Five-0" and gave the episode an editorial rating of 4.4 out of 5 stars. Carla Day also with TV Fanatic who reviewed the second part said ""Touch of Death" worked well, but the crossover was a bit of a mess. Even though they were tracking the same smallpox, the cases were very different. Back in Hawaii, it was all about Comescu, but then it took an odd shift from Jarrod Prodeman selling to Dr. Holden in Los Angeles" and gave the episode an editorial rating of 4.6 out of 5 stars.

=== Viewing figures ===
==== United States ====
In the United States the first part of the crossover was watched live by 10.91 million viewers. Within seven days, by digital streaming, DVR recording, and other means of delayed viewing the episode was watched by an additional 3.5 million for a final total of 14.33 million viewers. The second part was watched live by 15.21 million viewers which ranked second in viewers for the night and fifth in the week. Within seven days it was viewed by an additional 3.3 million for a final total of 18.52 million viewers.

==== Canada ====
In Canada the first part of the crossover was watched by 1.967 million viewers while the second was watched by 2.206 million, they ranked fourth and ninth for the week, respectively.

==== Australia ====
In Australia the first part of the crossover was watched by 0.295 million viewers while the second part was watched by 0.389 million.
