= Hawaii Five-0 (2010 TV series) season 2 =

Season of the 2010 television series

Hawaii Five-0
- Season 2
- Season 2 U.S. DVD cover
- Showrunner: Peter M. Lenkov
- Starring: Alex O'Loughlin; Scott Caan; Daniel Dae Kim; Grace Park; Masi Oka; Lauren German
- No. of episodes: 23

Release
- Original network: CBS
- Original release: September 19, 2011 – May 14, 2012

Season chronology
- ← Previous; Season 1 Next → Season 3

The second season of the CBS police procedural drama series Hawaii Five-0 premiered on September 19, 2011 for the 2011–12 television season. CBS renewed the series for a 23 episode second season on May 15, 2011. Two fictional crossovers with NCIS: Los Angeles occurred during the season in episodes six and twenty-one. The season concluded on May 14, 2012.

The series continues to center on the Five-0 Task Force, a specialized police state task force established by the Hawaiian Governor that investigates a wide series of crimes on the islands, including murder, terrorism, and human trafficking. The second season introduces a new governor, after the murder of his predecessor. However, unlike the previous governor, the new one orders changes to the task force. Taryn Manning did not return as a main cast member however, did make a guest appearance. In addition, the season includes two new main cast members, Masi Oka, who recurred in the first season, and Lauren German, who debuted in episode two and began receiving an "Also starring" credit in episode five. German departed after episode sixteen. Alex O'Loughlin missed some filming as he was seeking drug treatment for pain management medication during the production season.

The second season ranked #26 for the 2011–12 television season, had an average of 11.83 million viewers, and received mostly positive reviews. "Haʻiʻole", the season premiere, brought in the most viewers for the season with 12.19 million; meanwhile, the season finale, "Ua Hala" had the fourth highest amount with 11.42 million. The series was also renewed for a third season on March 14, 2012 which later premiered on September 24.

== Cast and characters ==
Season 2 main cast: Grace Park, Daniel Dae Kim, Alex O'Loughlin, Scott Caan, and Lauren German

=== Main ===
- Alex O'Loughlin as Lieutenant Commander Steven "Steve" McGarrett, United States Navy Reserve
- Scott Caan as Detective Sergeant Daniel "Danny" "Danno" Williams
- Daniel Dae Kim as Detective Lieutenant Chin Ho Kelly
- Grace Park as Officer Kono Kalakaua
- Masi Oka as Dr. Max Bergman, Chief Medical Examiner
- Lauren German as Special Agent Lori Weston, Department of Homeland Security assigned to the Five-0 Task Force

=== Recurring ===
- Mark Dacascos as Wo Fat
- Reiko Aylesworth as Dr. Malia Waincroft
- William Baldwin as Frank Delano
- Dennis Chun as HPD Sergeant Duke Lukela
- Ian Anthony Dale as Adam Noshimuri
- Teilor Grubbs as Grace Williams
- Richard T. Jones as Governor Sam Denning
- Terry O'Quinn as Lieutenant Commander Joe White
- Larisa Oleynik as Jenna Kaye
- Autumn Reeser as Dr. Gabrielle Asano
- Tom Sizemore as Capt. Vincent Fryer
- Taylor Wily as Kamekona Tupuola
- Brian Yang as Che "Charlie" Fong

=== Crossover characters ===
- Daniela Ruah as Kensi Blye
- LL Cool J as Sam Hanna
- Chris O'Donnell as G. Callen
- Craig Robert Young as Dracul Comescu

=== Guest stars ===
- Ed Asner as August March
- Annie Wersching as Samantha Martel
- Jimmy Buffett as Frank Bama
- James Caan as Tony Archer
- Patty Duke as Sylvia Spencer
- Robert Englund as Samuel Lee
- Dennis Miller as Bobby Raines
- Michelle Borth as Lieutenant Catherine Rollins
- William Sadler as John McGarrett
- Taryn Manning as Mary Ann McGarrett
- Claire van der Boom as Rachel Edwards
- David Keith as Commanding Officer Wade Gutches
- Will Yun Lee as Sang Min Sooh

== Episodes ==
The title of each episode is in the Hawaiian language with the English translation directly underneath.

| No. overall | No. in season | Title | Directed by | Written by | Original release date | Prod. code | U.S. viewers (millions) |
|---|---|---|---|---|---|---|---|
| 25 | 1 | "Haʻiʻole" "Unbreakable" | Steve Boyum | Peter M. Lenkov & Paul Zbyszewski | September 19, 2011 | 201 | 12.19 |
After Steve McGarrett is arrested for Governor Jameson's murder, Danny brings in Joe White to help clear him. Victor Hesse aids in McGarrett's escape by stabbing him. On his way to the hospital, McGarrett breaks out. Kono Kalakaua is suspended for her theft, but assists Chin Ho Kelly. She finds Wo Fat meeting with a weapons buyer, Kurt Hauff and is caught. Danny discovers footage of a meeting between John McGarrett, Governor Jameson, and Wo Fat on the camera, and Steve suggests asking Hesse about the meeting. Before they can question Hesse, Wo Fat kills him and is seen being driven away by Jenna Kaye. Cast : This is the first episode to feature Masi Oka as a main cast member.
| 26 | 2 | "Ua Lawe Wale" "Taken" | Duane Clark | Melissa Glenn & Jessica Rieder | September 26, 2011 | 202 | 11.26 |
Governor Denning assigns Homeland Security officer Lori Weston (Lauren German) to Five-0 to ensure the team follows the new rules set by him and to also apply her profiling skills to the task force. Their first investigation is the kidnapping of teenage paddleboard champion Jenn Hassley (Hayley Chase), and they have 24 hours to find her because she is taken without the medicine she needs to stay alive. They find that their suspect, Matt Porter (Jason Rawcliffe), actually rescued girls from religious cults. The team finds a cult in the island of Lānaʻi that rejects all modern teachings and believes that society and its own trappings are the workings of the Devil. Meanwhile, Jenna leaves the team after receiving word that her fiancé may still be alive. Elsewhere, Internal Affairs captain Vince Fryer (Tom Sizemore) strips Kono of her badge.
| 27 | 3 | "Kameʻe" "The Hero" | Jeffrey Hunt | Elwood Reid | October 3, 2011 | 203 | 11.07 |
Five-0 probes the death of a Navy SEAL, one of Joe White's former charges. Initially ruled as a suicide, the team discovers he was drugged and murdered to mimic a suicide. Sometime later, the team uncovers the death of another SEAL in a car accident, however Max finds he was killed before the accident. It emerges that both SEALs were part of a covert team tasked with taking down a Central American drug cartel and a professional hitman is after a third SEAL. Meanwhile, Chin Ho worries about Kono after she starts hanging out with a group of dirty ex-cops, including Frank Delano (William Baldwin).
| 28 | 4 | "Mea Makamae" "Treasure" | Duane Clark | David Wolkove | October 10, 2011 | 204 | 10.07 |
The severed hand of deep-sea diver Blake Spencer is found in the waters of Waikiki. Five-0 discover that he found treasure from a sunken galleon off the Oahu coast, which later turns out to be fake. Meanwhile, Chin Ho realizes Kono logged onto HPD's database with his password, which she is using to grant Delano access. McGarrett realizes White did not release the video with Wo Fat, Governor Jameson, and John McGarrett to the Department of Defense, and White claims he was trying to protect John. Cast : The role of the diver's mother, who suffers from Alzheimer's, was played by Patty Duke.
| 29 | 5 | "Maʻemaʻe" "Clean" | Steve Boyum | Stephanie Sengupta | October 17, 2011 | 205 | 11.07 |
Five-0 investigates the death of a volleyball coach, which leads them to a married couple where he stayed, Carl and Trisha Joyner. Trisha ends up missing, and Carl is killed by a sniper. Lori and Chin end up mortally wounding a gunman, who is being driven by Kono. When Five-0 arrests Kono, Captain Fryer of Internal Affairs reveals she is working undercover to stop Delano. Kono is reinstated to the task force. Meanwhile, Chin Ho and his former fiancee Malia (Reiko Aylesworth) begin spending time together again. Cast : This is the first episode to feature Lauren German as a main cast member.
| 30 | 6 | "Ka Hakaka Maikaʻi" "The Good Fight" | Larry Teng | Kyle Harimoto | October 24, 2011 | 206 | 10.70 |
Five-0 investigate the murder of local restaurant owner and philanthropist Jake Griffin, seemingly part of a series of home invasions in the area. However, after catching the gang, they realize they did not murder the man. Later, McGarrett participates in a charity MMA fight against Chuck Liddell, taking the place of another fighter (Gino Anthony Pesi) whom he injured after Martel attempted to frame him. Meanwhile, Joe White calls in L.A NCIS agent Kensi Blye (Daniela Ruah) to review the video of John McGarrett, Governor Jameson, and Wo Fat, but only recognizes the word "Shelburne". When White returns home, he encounters Wo Fat, who tries to kill him. After White pushes him away, he goes to Mokoto, but finds Wo Fat beat him to it and killed Mokoto.
| 31 | 7 | "Ka Iwi Kapu" "Sacred Bones" | Joe Dante | Michele Fazekas & Tara Butters | October 31, 2011 | 207 | 10.60 |
A young couple is murdered on a heiau while shooting a documentary on Halloween night. During the autopsy, Max uncovers a fingerprint from a criminal who was killed by his girlfriend several months before. Later, while examining the burial ground through ground-penetrating radar, Five-0 initially assumes they are dealing with a serial killer when they find several bodies not belonging to the ancient Hawaiians. Meanwhile, Danny ignores the warnings of his co-workers and a drifter (Robert Englund), and later finds out the hard way the consequences of trespassing on the burial grounds. Danny then decides to buy one of the victim's apartments, but changes his mind after believing that he saw the ghost of one of the tenants before ordering the team to pack up everything, much to their dismay.
| 32 | 8 | "Lapaʻau" "Healing" | Steve Boyum | Joe Halpin | November 7, 2011 | 208 | 10.32 |
Immigration and Customs Enforcement (ICE) agent Monica Jensen is found dead inside a plane crash off the coast of the North Shore. Max's autopsy reveals she was dead long before the plane even took off, and Five-0 learns that Jensen was investigating possible illegal activities at a medicinal marijuana shop. Danny decides to adopt Jensen's dog.
| 33 | 9 | "Ike Maka" "Identity" | Bryan Spicer | Mike Schaub | November 14, 2011 | 209 | 11.71 |
Sergeant Duke Lukela and his team in the HPD uncover a car theft ring but pass the case on to Five-0 after a bandaged body is discovered in the trunk of one of the cars. The team find it nearly impossible to identify the victim because he had extensive plastic surgery. Eventually, they find that he was placed in witness protection after he witnessed an Irish Mob hit in Boston. Meanwhile, Danny is forced to sleep on McGarrett's couch until he can find another apartment. Elsewhere, Steve and Danny try and figure out why Max is ignoring them and acting overly friendly to Lori.
| 34 | 10 | "Kiʻilua" "Deceiver" | Kate Woods | Peter M. Lenkov & Paul Zbyszewski | November 21, 2011 | 210 | 10.59 |
Bethany Morris is found murdered in her apartment. Jenna Kaye receives news her fiancé is alive, but wants McGarrett to rescue him in North Korea. When they arrive Jenna double crosses McGarrett, revealing she is working with Wo Fat, and captures him in exchange for her fiancé. Wo Fat later interrogates and tortures McGarrett to find out what Shelburne is. When they learn of McGarrett's capture, they and Joe White along with a SEAL team go on a mission to rescue him. Jenna helps McGarrett escape but is killed in the process. As they return to Hawaii, Chin Ho announces he is engaged to Malia again.
| 35 | 11 | "Pahele" "Trap" | Paul Edwards | Melissa Glenn & Jessica Rieder | December 5, 2011 | 211 | 11.01 |
Governor Denning announces that a large shipment of cocaine was seized by a previous bust. In retaliation, a school bus full of private students is hijacked. The kidnappers, who work for a drug cartel, demand that Five-0 returns a large shipment of cocaine. Meanwhile, Joe White is forced into an early retirement after rescuing McGarrett in North Korea and he continues to investigate "Shelburne", kidnapping Hiro Noshimuri in the process. Noshimuri tells McGarret that Shelburne is an unidentified person, the only one Wo Fat fears. White is later seen calling an unknown person and tells them that they have to move due to McGarrett getting too close in his investigation.
| 36 | 12 | "Alaheo Pauʻole" "Gone Forever" | Jeff T. Thomas | Elwood Reid | December 12, 2011 | 212 | 11.17 |
Three teens discover a body in an abandoned World War II bunker but when Steve and Max examine the body for themselves, they discover that the supposedly dead victim is actually alive, which leads them to cross paths with newly promoted Chief of Detectives, Vince Fryer. Meanwhile, Five-0 prepare for Chin and Malia's wedding. Also, Hiro Noshimuri’s son Adam tells McGarret that his father has not been seen ever since Joe White kidnapped him.
| 37 | 13 | "Ka Hoʻoponopono" "The Fix" | Steve Boyum | Stephanie Sengupta | January 2, 2012 | 213 | 11.90 |
A 17-year-old girl is found smothered to death in her bedroom. Before her death, she stole $5,000 from her father after her best friend Carolyn (Courtney Coleman) was blackmailed for having sexual relations with their school principal. When the blackmailer discovers he also recorded the girl's murder, Five-0 find she was killed by a professional hitman. Meanwhile, Joe returns from Japan again and is later kidnapped by Adam Noshimuri (Ian Anthony Dale), Hiro's son, who believes he murdered him. When McGarrett later rescues him, Joe reveals he actually faked Hiro's death, but would not say why. McGarrett gets angry at this, knowing that he went through torture by Wo Fat.
| 38 | 14 | "Puʻolo" "The Package" | Christine Moore | David Wolkove | January 16, 2012 | 214 | 10.73 |
A Trans-Hawaiian Parcel truck is violently robbed in broad daylight but Kono's investigation reveals nothing missing. They reluctantly rely on Sang Min's help when it has emerged that one of the couriers smuggled 100 electronic chips used in passports to allow smugglers to forge them. Meanwhile, Danny is called to the hospital to help his ex-wife Rachel deliver her baby since her husband Stan is out of town. The Yakuza attempts to have Joe killed. Seeing how the situation is getting out of hand, Joe eventually agrees to tell Adam that his father is in hiding from Wo Fat. Later, Joe reveals to McGarrett that he is Shelburne, and he killed Wo Fat's father.
| 39 | 15 | "Mai Ka Wa Kahiko" "Out of the Past" | Larry Teng | Bill Nuss | February 6, 2012 | 215 | 9.97 |
A US Marshal and friend of Danny's is found dead. Five-0 begins searching for the prisoner he escorted, Rick Maguire, but soon discovers that Maguire died two years ago, and that someone is posing as him. It is revealed that the person in question is Rick Peterson, Danny's ex-partner from New Jersey who was jailed for corruption. Peterson returned seeking revenge against Danny who testified at Peterson's trial and has kidnapped Grace.
| 40 | 16 | "I Helu Pu" "The Reckoning" | Eric Laneuville | Paul Zbyszewski | February 13, 2012 | 216 | 9.70 |
Five-0 finds a young woman dead in a hotel where Denning is hosting a charity silent auction. They discover the suspect is hiding and being protected by the Russian consulate. To lure him out, Chin Ho breaks into the consulate, setting off an international incident. McGarrett chases the suspect, but both get hit by a car driven by Five-0 member Lori Weston. The international fallout prompts the Governor to punish Lori by forcing her to resign from the task force. Cast : This is the last episode to feature Lauren German as a main cast member.
| 41 | 17 | "Kupale" "Defender" | Steve Boyum | Noah Nelson & Lisa Schultz | February 20, 2012 | 217 | 10.40 |
After McGarrett returns home from reservist training, Five-0 probes the death of Brandon Koruba, a local shipbuilder who enjoys Hawaiian history, in the jungle near the site of a historical war re-enactment he participated in. The team realizes Koruba was targeted by a fundamental environmentalist group after he was planning to introduce a ferry that would damage the eco-systems of the Hawaiian waters. Meanwhile, McGarrett and Danny argue about Danny's apprehension to introducing Grace to his girlfriend Gabrielle Asano.
| 42 | 18 | "Lekio" "Radio" | Bryan Spicer | Kyle Harimoto | February 27, 2012 | 218 | 9.58 |
Five-0 probes the death of pirate radio DJ Bobby Raines (Dennis Miller), who was killed in his home studio by an IED. The investigation pauses temporarily when his body is stolen by his fans, known as "Acolytes". When the body is recovered, they uncover a prime suspect, retired NYPD bomb expert Tony Archer (James Caan, Scott Caan's father), whose team of officers was a constant target of Raines.
| 43 | 19 | "Kalele" "Faith" | Frederick E. O. Toye | Joe Halpin | March 19, 2012 | 219 | 9.31 |
McGarrett's sister Mary (Taryn Manning), returns to Hawaii for a visit, revealing she is now a flight attendant. When she returns to her hotel room, a Liberian man (Tony Todd) forces her to smuggle $20 million worth of conflict diamonds to New York, or else fellow flight attendant and friend Angela will die. She is caught before she can board the flight, and the team now have nine hours until the plane lands to save Angela. Five-0 and Chief Fryer team up and enlist the help of August March (Ed Asner), who served a 30-year sentence for smuggling diamonds.
| 44 | 20 | "Haʻalele" "Abandoned" | Jerry Levine | Elwood Reid | April 9, 2012 | 220 | 10.30 |
The body of a young woman is found, and Max's autopsy reveals the trademarks of a serial killer known as "The Trashman", even though the apparent killer has been imprisoned. In the investigation, Five-0 finds a link between past and current victims; all women gave birth and left their infants at the same parish. The team finds evidence that links the caretaker to the killer. Meanwhile, Kamekona believes someone has stolen his shrimp truck but as it turns out, he just forgot to renew his license, causing the City of Honolulu to impound the truck. Later, Danny tries to call Steve who ignores the call with Steve later shown to be in Tokyo, Japan, ready to board a plane.
| 45 | 21 | "Pa Make Loa" "Touch of Death" | Bryan Spicer | Michele Fazekas & Tara Butters & R. Scott Gemmill | April 30, 2012 | 221 | 10.91 |
With McGarrett still out of the country, Five-0 investigates the death of a former army soldier from an advanced form of smallpox. They find that the victim, and several others who are missing, were exposed to smallpox believing they were testing with a new form of antidepressant. They find a suspect, Dracul Comescu of the Romanian Comescu crime family. OSP Agents G. Callen and Sam Hanna from NCIS: Los Angeles are called in to assist Five-0 as Callen has history with Comescu. Note : This episode begins a crossover event that concludes on NCIS: Los Angeles season 3 episode 21.
| 46 | 22 | "Ua Hopu" "Caught" | Larry Teng | Stephanie Sengupta | May 7, 2012 | 222 | 9.39 |
In Osaka, McGarrett and Interpol find and arrest Wo Fat, who surrenders a bit too easily. In addition, it is revealed that Wo Fat found and killed Hiro Noshimuri and that Kono is dating Hiro's son, Adam. In Honolulu, the rest of Five-0 traces a phone call Wo Fat made to an undercover CIA agent, Wo Fat's "get out of jail free card", who is found dead. As McGarrett and Wo Fat's plane approaches Hawaii, McGarrett finds that the pilots are Yakuza. During the struggle, the plane crashes in the Oahu jungle, leaving McGarrett and Wo Fat as the only two survivors and at the mercy of more Yakuza operatives with the intent to kill Wo Fat in revenge for the death of Hiro Noshimuri.
| 47 | 23 | "Ua Hala" "Death in the Family" | Steve Boyum | Peter M. Lenkov & Paul Zbyszewski & Elwood Reid | May 14, 2012 | 223 | 11.42 |
Danny learns Stan and Rachel are moving to Las Vegas, and faces losing custody of Grace. After arriving at the scene of a fake murder, Fryer is killed. Five-0 investigates the scene, the shooter wounds Max before escaping with a police car. The team chase the shooter to HPD headquarters, where they use a gas leak to blow up the building. The culprit, Hillary Chaver, was a criminal Fryer and Delano once worked to catch, until she faked her death. It becomes apparent that Chaver had a partner who also worked with Delano, and Chin is blackmailed into breaking Delano out of prison after Kono and Malia are kidnapped and Delano forces Chin to choose which one to save. Meanwhile, McGarrett and Joe return to Japan where Steve meets Shelburne, who turns out to be his dead mother.

=== Crossovers ===
The season featured two crossovers with NCIS: Los Angeles. The first crossover event took place in the sixth episode, entitled "Ka Hakaka Maikaʻi" (or "The Good Fight" in English), Daniela Ruah made a guest appearance as her NCIS: LA character Kensi Blye; the episode aired on October 24, 2011. The second event took place in the form of a two-part crossover. Chris O’Donnell and LL Cool J appeared as G. Callen and Sam Hanna in the twenty-first episode of the season titled "Pa Make Loa" ("Touch of Death") on April 30, 2012. In the second part, Scott Caan and Daniel Dae Kim appeared in the NCIS: Los Angeles third season episode "Touch of Death" which aired on May 1, 2012.

== Production ==
=== Development ===
On May 15, 2011, CBS renewed Hawaii Five-0 for a second season which premiered on CBS on September 19, 2011. Filming for the season began on July 11, 2011 with a traditional Hawaiian blessing. As of March 2, 2012 the twentieth episode was being filmed and production was ahead of schedule. On March 14, 2012 the series was renewed for a third season. The season concluded airing on May 14, 2012.

=== Casting ===
Taryn Manning is the only main cast member to not return after departing the series in the middle first season; however, she did reprise her role as Mary Ann McGarrett as a guest star in the nineteenth episode of the season. On May 16, 2011 while the first season was still airing it was announced that Masi Oka, who recurred as medical examiner Max Bergman, would be promoted to a main cast member for the second season. It was reported on June 21, 2011 that Terry O'Quinn was cast as a Navy Seal Lt. Commander, meanwhile on June 27, 2011 it was announced that Tom Sizemore would recur in a multi-episode story arc throughout the season. On July 12, 2011 it was announced that Lauren German had been cast in a recurring role, beginning in the second episode, as Special Agent Lori Weston, a potential love interest for Alex O'Loughlin's character Steve McGarrett. She was later upgraded to a series regular beginning with the fifth episode. Larisa Oleynik who also recurred in the first season reprised her role as former CIA operative Jenna Kaye William Baldwin also guest starred in a multi-episode story arc. On August 18, 2011 it was reported that Daniela Ruah would guest star in a crossover episode as her NCIS: Los Angeles character Kensi Blye. In episode nineteen, Ed Asner reprised his role as August March from the original series episode "Wooden Model of a Rat:, footage from the episode was used for March's second appearance. During a second crossover event later in the season LL Cool J and Chris O'Donnell also appeared in an episode as their respective NCIS: Los Angeles characters Sam Hanna and G. Callen. On March 2, 2012, CBS announced that O'Loughlin would miss shooting some episodes of Hawaii Five-0 to seek drug treatment related to pain management medication prescribed after a shoulder injury. He makes a brief appearance in episode twenty and does not appear at all in episode twenty-one. German departed the series in the sixteenth episode and was subsequently cast in Chicago Fire.

== Release and marketing ==
On July 12, 2011 it was announced that the season would have an advanced premiere screening on September 10. The annual event known as "Sunset on the Beach", featured a red carpet and interviews with the cast and crew at Waikiki beach in Honolulu, Hawaii. When CBS released their fall schedule on May 18, 2011 it was revealed that the series would keep its time slot from the first season and continue airing on Mondays at 10 p.m. Eastern Time.

== Reception ==
=== Critical response ===
Kevin Yeoman with Screen Rant stated about the series premiere "Hawaii Five-0 managed to do what it does best in the season 2 opener: move at such breakneck speed that the audience hardly has time to recognize the implausibility of it all" and that "The plot of ‘Ha'i'ole’ is paper-thin, as are the majority of the characters and their motivations". Jim Garner at TV Fanatic says "I have to hand it to Peter Lenkov, he certainly knows how to shake things up and give us a dramatic ending".

=== Awards and nominations ===
On May 18, 2012, it was announced that the series had been nominated for three Teen Choice Awards at the 2012 Teen Choice Awards ceremony. Hawaii Five-0 as a whole received its second nomination for Choice Action Series. Daniel Dae Kim and Grace Park both received their second nomination for Choice TV Actor Action and Choice TV Actress Action respectively. All three nominations were lost. As part of the Creative Arts Emmy Awards at the 64th Primetime Creative Arts Emmy Awards, stunt coordinator Jeff Cadiente was nominated for an Emmy Award in "Outstanding Stunt Coordination" for the episode "Kameʻe". Composers Keith Power and Brian Tyler won the "BMI TV Music Award" at the 2012 BMI awards.

=== Ratings ===
| No. | Episode | Air date | 18-49 rating | Viewers (millions) | Weekly rank | Live+7 18-49 | Live+7 viewers (millions) |
|---|---|---|---|---|---|---|---|
| 1 | "Haʻiʻole" | September 19, 2011 | 3.4 | 12.19 | #24 | 4.6 | 15.79 |
| 2 | "Ua Lawe Wale" | September 26, 2011 | 3.3 | 11.26 | #22 | 4.4 | 14.94 |
| 3 | "Kameʻe" | October 3, 2011 | 3.2 | 11.07 | #23 | 4.3 | 14.46 |
| 4 | "Mea Makamae" | October 10, 2011 | 2.7 | 10.07 | N/A | 3.8 | 13.28 |
| 5 | "Maʻemaʻe" | October 17, 2011 | 3.1 | 11.07 | #25 | 4.2 | 14.39 |
| 6 | "Ka Hakaka Maikaʻi" | October 24, 2011 | 3.1 | 10.70 | N/A | 4.3 | 14.12 |
| 7 | "Ka Iwi Kapu" | October 31, 2011 | 3.0 | 10.60 | N/A | 4.1 | 14.10 |
| 8 | "Lapaʻau" | November 7, 2011 | 3.1 | 10.32 | #23 | 4.3 | 13.96 |
| 9 | "Ike Maka" | November 14, 2011 | 3.3 | 11.71 | #18 | 4.4 | 15.08 |
| 10 | "Kiʻilua" | November 21, 2011 | 2.8 | 10.59 | #15 | 4.1 | 14.35 |
| 11 | "Pahele" | December 5, 2011 | 3.0 | 11.01 | #20 | 4.2 | 14.37 |
| 12 | "Alaheo Pauʻole" | December 12, 2011 | 2.8 | 11.17 | #15 | 4.2 | 14.82 |
| 13 | "Ka Hoʻoponopono" | January 2, 2012 | 2.9 | 11.90 | #11 | 4.1 | 15.29 |
| 14 | "Puʻolo" | January 16, 2012 | 2.8 | 10.73 | #18 | 3.9 | 14.24 |
| 15 | "Mai Ka Wa Kahiko" | February 6, 2012 | 2.7 | 9.97 | #24 | 3.7 | 13.08 |
| 16 | "I Helo Pu" | February 13, 2012 | 2.7 | 9.70 | #25 | 3.7 | 12.77 |
| 17 | "Kupale" | February 20, 2012 | 2.9 | 10.40 | #21 | 4.0 | 13.67 |
| 18 | "Lekio" | February 27, 2012 | 2.5 | 9.58 | #25 | 3.6 | 13.09 |
| 19 | "Kalele" | March 19, 2012 | 2.5 | 9.31 | N/A | 3.5 | 12.36 |
| 20 | "Haʻalele" | April 9, 2012 | 2.6 | 10.30 | #12 | 3.6 | 13.42 |
| 21 | "Pa Make Loa" | April 30, 2012 | 2.5 | 10.91 | #14 | 3.5 | 14.33 |
| 22 | "Ua Hopu" | May 7, 2012 | 2.3 | 9.39 | #25 | 3.2 | 12.41 |
| 23 | "Ua Hala" | May 14, 2012 | 2.7 | 11.42 | #14 | 3.6 | 14.42 |

== Home video release ==
Hawaii Five-0: The Second Season
| Set details | Special features | |
| 23 episodes; 6-disc set; 1.78:1 aspect ratio; Languages: English (Dolby Digital 5.1, with subtitles); Subtitles in English, Spanish, and Portuguese; Audio commentaries on "Ha'i'ole" and "Ki'ilua" | Shore Lines: The Story of Hawaii Five-0 Season 2; Aloha Action! Season 2; Becoming a SEAL: An Insider's Guide to the World's Toughest Training; Hawaii Five-0'Ahu: An Interactive Guide to Season 2 Locations; Touch of Death (NCIS: Los Angeles Crossover Episode); Deleted Scenes; Gag Reel | |
DVD release dates
| Region 1 | Region 2 | Region 4 |
| September 18, 2012 | September 24, 2012 | April 12, 2013 |
