= Ka Hakaka Maikaʻi =

- Hawaii Five-0 episode
- Kensi Blye (Daniela Ruah) in a crossover appearance as her NCIS: Los Angeles character.
- Episode no.: Season 2 Episode 6
- Directed by: Larry Teng
- Written by: Kyle Harimoto
- Production code: 206
- Original air date: October 24, 2011

Guest appearances
- Terry O'Quinn as Joe White; Taylor Wily as Kamekona; Mark Dacascos as Wo Fat; Daniela Ruah as Kensi Blye; Annie Wersching as Samantha Martel; Dylan Bell as Josh Griffin; Shawn Hatosy as Marshall Martel; Kevin Yamada as Mr. Lasko; Traci Toguchi as Mrs. Lasko; Kila Packett as Dave Lockhart; Gino Anthony Pesi as Vitor Boriero; Christian West as Ref; Chuck Liddell as himself

Episode chronology
← Previous "Ma'ema'e"	Next → "Ka Iwi Kapu"
- Hawaii Five-0 (2010 TV series) season 2

"Ka Hakaka Maika'i" (Hawaiian for: "The Good Fight") is the sixth episode of the second season of Hawaii Five-0. It aired on October 24, 2011, on CBS. The episode was written by Kyle Harimoto and directed by Larry Teng. The episode included a crossover appearance from Daniela Ruah as Kensi Blye, her character from NCIS: Los Angeles.

== Plot ==
Joe White has Special Agent Kensi Blye, an agent with the Naval Criminal Investigative Service in Los Angeles, watch the video showing John McGarrett attending a meeting with deceased Governor Pat Jameson and Wo Fat. From the video, Kensi figures out that John is saying the word, "Shelburne" over and over again. Meanwhile, the team investigates to murder of Jake Griffin, who was found dead after having drowned in the swimming pool of his home. The team realizes that the murder could be connected to a series of home invasions that have taken place recently. Later on, the team invades a house, where a family is being held hostage, and they successfully apprehend all the members of the gang, but they realize that the gang did not kill Jake. They later determine that Jake's brother-in-law, MMA instructor Marshall Martel, is the one responsible for killing Jake, and that Marshall attempted to cover up the killing as a home invasion gone wrong. Steve later participates in a charity MMA fight against Chuck Liddell, taking the place of another fighter, Vitor Boriero who got injured because Marshall also tried to frame him for the murder. When Joe returns home, he encounters Wo Fat, who tries to kill him. After Joe pushes him away, Joe goes to Mokoto, but finds Wo Fat beat him to it and killed Mokoto.

== Production ==
Hawaii Five-0 and NCIS: Los Angeles crossed over again with the two-part crossover event, "Touch of Death", later in the season.

=== Casting ===
The episode featured a crossover appearance from NCIS: Los Angeles: Daniela Ruah as Kensi Blye. MMA fighter Chuck Liddell also appeared in the episode as himself.

== Reception ==
=== Viewing figures ===
In the United States the episode was watched live by 10.70 million viewers. Within seven days, the episode was watched by a total of 14.12 million viewers.

=== Critical response ===
Jim Garner with TV Fanatic said "it was disappointing that the show stuck with its current trend of advertising a guest star and then only featuring one scene with him/her. This week we got to meet Agent Kensi Blye (Daniela Ruah) from NCIS: Los Angeles. She clearly had a history with Joe, which I had hoped meant we would see her for more than three minutes. Alas, it was not to be." He also gave the episode an editorial rating of 4.6 out of 5 stars.
