= Natalia del Riego =

American actress

- Born: January 6, 2001 (age 25); Dallas, Texas
- Occupation: Actress
- Years active: 2016–present

Natalia del Riego is an American actress. She is best known for playing Daniela Perez in the family drama series Promised Land and Rosa Reyes in NCIS: Los Angeles.

== Early life ==
Del Riego was born in Dallas, Texas. She is of Salvadoran descent though her father Marco Alcarez who is from Yucuaiquin, El Salvador.

== Career ==
Del Riego initially struggled to get roles in Hollywood and was close to poverty. Being away from her parents for long spells led her to becoming depressed. She has said her role in Hail Mary reflects how she felt in real life at the time. Her first big role came playing Daniela Perez in the family drama series Promised Land. Her biggest role so far has been playing Rosa Reyes in the crime series NCIS: Los Angeles. She also made an appearance in the police procedural series Chicago P.D. She is currently starring in the western action drama series The Abandons.

In January 2026, Deadline Hollywood announced that del Riego will be acting in a screen adaptation of Karen McQuestion 's novel, The Moonlight Child, The project is slated for film with the title And Then She Was Gone, and will also feature her co-star from NCIS: Los Angeles, Daniela Ruah, who will be a producer on the film. The screenplay was written by Justin Kohlas who will executive produce under his KimberMark banner, alongside Ruah and Riccardo Maddalosso (Armageddon Time ).

== Filmography ==
=== Film ===
| Year | Title | Role | Notes |
|---|---|---|---|
| 2017 | Sage Alexander Hall of Nightmares: VR Experience | Elsbeth Brown | Short |
| 2021 | The Mitchells vs. the Machines | Additional Voices | |
| 2021 | Noche del Infierno (Hell Night) | Elena | Short |
| 2023 | Hail Mary | Maria | |
| 2024 | Remember Us | Maria | Short |

=== Television ===
| Year | Title | Role | Notes |
|---|---|---|---|
| 2016 | American Crime | Oriana | 3 episodes |
| 2019 | How to Get Away with Murder | Marisol Diaz | 2 episodes |
| 2020 | Party of Five | Alma | 2 episodes |
| 2019-2020 | The Rookie | Nora Valdez | 2 episodes |
| 2020 | The Last Word | Judith Fazius | 6 episodes |
| 2019-2020 | Solve: The Podcast | Meg, Courtney | 2 episodes |
| 2021 | Kamikaze | Julie | 4 episodes |
| 2022 | Promised Land | Daniela Perez | 6 episodes |
| 2022 | Quantum Leap | Valentina de la Cruz | Episode; Salvation or Bust |
| 2022-2023 | NCIS: Los Angeles | Rosa Reyes | 10 episodes |
| 2023 | Interrupting Chicken | Princess Saphire | Episode; The Magnificent Magician of the Mailbox/Once Upon a Chicken |
| 2024 | The Baxters | Julia | Episode; Return Together |
| 2023-2024 | Velma | Becca | 3 episodes |
| 2024 | Megamind Rules! | Terry Sasko | 4 episodes |
| 2025 | Chicago P.D. | Ruby Rios | Episode; Name Image Likeness |
| 2025 | Trolls: Fun Fair Surprise | Viva | 10 episodes |
| 2025 | The Abandons | Lilla Bella | 10 episodes |

=== Video Games ===
| Year | Title | Role | Notes |
|---|---|---|---|
| 2022 | Saints Row | Santo Ileso Pedestrians | |
| 2022 | God of War Ragnarök | Huntress | |
| 2023 | Marvel's Spider-Man 2 | Odyssey | |
