= The Relationtrip =

- Directed by: C.A. Gabriel; Renée Felice Smith
- Written by: C.A. Gabriel; Renée Felice Smith; Dana Scanlon
- Produced by: C.A. Gabriel; Renée Felice Smith; Rachel Kiri Walker
- Starring: Renée Felice Smith; Matt Bush
- Cinematography: Damian Horan
- Edited by: Eric Wilson
- Music by: C.A. Gabriel
- Production company: My Boy Hugo
- Distributed by: Passion River Films
- Release dates: 11 March 2017 (South by Southwest Film Festival); 16 January 2018 (US)
- Running time: 90 minutes
- Country: United States
- Language: English

The Relationtrip is a 2017 American romantic comedy film directed by C.A. Gabriel and Renée Felice Smith, starring Renée Felice Smith and Matt Bush.

== Cast ==
- Renée Felice Smith as Beck
- Matt Bush as Liam
- Nelson Franklin as Buddy
- Brandon Kyle Goodman as Franklin
- Eric Christian Olsen as Chippy (voice)
- Amy Hessler as Eden
- Linda Hunt as Dr. Lipschweiss

== Release ==
The film premiered at the Narrative Feature Competition section of South by Southwest on 11 March 2017.

== Reception ==
Kate Erbland of IndieWire gave the film a rating of "B-" and wrote that "Smith and Gabriel clearly know their genre and have unique ideas as to how to pillage it for fresh entertainment, but their resistance to fully embrace one idea over the other holds “The Relationtrip” back from really subverting its material."

Gary M. Kramer of Salon.com wrote that "the good ideas and gimmicks come through, showing the promise that's there, but overall it misses the mark."
