= Teen Choice Award for Choice Action TV Show =

The following is a list of Teen Choice Award winners and nominees for Choice TV - Action. This award was first introduced (along with Choice TV Actor - Action and Choice TV Actress - Action) in 2008.

== Winners and Nominees ==
=== 2000s ===
| Year | Winner | Nominees | Ref. |
|---|---|---|---|
| 2008 | Heroes | Lost; Prison Break; Smallville; Terminator: The Sarah Connor Chronicles | |
| 2009 | Heroes | 24; Lost; Smallville; Terminator: The Sarah Connor Chronicles | |

=== 2010s ===
| Year | Winner | Nominees | Ref. |
|---|---|---|---|
| 2010 | NCIS: Los Angeles | 24; Burn Notice; Chuck; Human Target | |
| 2011 | NCIS: Los Angeles | Burn Notice; Chuck; Hawaii Five-0; Nikita | |
| 2012 | CSI: Miami | Chuck; Hawaii Five-0; NCIS: Los Angeles; Nikita | |
| 2013 | NCIS: Los Angeles | Chicago Fire; Elementary; Hawaii Five-0; Nikita | |
| 2017 | The Flash | Agents of S.H.I.E.L.D.; Arrow; Gotham; Lethal Weapon; Supergirl | |
| 2018 | The Flash | Agents of S.H.I.E.L.D.; Arrow; Gotham; Lethal Weapon; Supergirl | |
| 2019 | MacGyver | Arrow; The Flash; Gotham; Legends of Tomorrow; Supergirl | |
