= NCIS: Los Angeles =

American military drama/police procedural television series (2009–2023)

- Genre: Police procedural; Military fiction; Action
- Created by: Shane Brennan
- Based on: NCIS by: Donald P. Bellisario; Don McGill
- Starring: Chris O'Donnell; Peter Cambor; Daniela Ruah; Adam Jamal Craig; Linda Hunt; LL Cool J; Barrett Foa; Eric Christian Olsen; Renée Felice Smith; Miguel Ferrer; Nia Long; Medalion Rahimi; Caleb Castille; Gerald McRaney
- Theme music composer: James S. Levine
- Composers: Jay Ferguson; James S. Levine; Craig Dobbin; Adonis Tsilimparis; 2Up in the Club; Martin Davich; Brendan Ryan
- Country of origin: United States
- Original language: English
- No. of seasons: 14
- No. of episodes: 323 (list of episodes)

Production
- Executive producers: Shane Brennan; Kyle Harimoto; Frank Military; John Peter Kousakis; R. Scott Gemmill
- Cinematography: Victor Hammer; Russell McElhatton (2013)
- Running time: 42–44 minutes
- Production companies: R. Scott Gemmill Productions (2016–2023); Shane Brennan Productions; CBS Studios (Note: Credited as CBS Television Studios until 2020)

Original release
- Network: CBS
- Release: September 22, 2009 – May 21, 2023

Related
- Hawaii Five-0; NCIS; NCIS: New Orleans; NCIS: Hawaiʻi; NCIS: Sydney; NCIS: Origins; NCIS: Tony & Ziva; NCIS: New York

NCIS: Los Angeles is an American military police procedural television series that aired on CBS from September 22, 2009, to May 21, 2023. Created by Shane Brennan, the series starred Chris O'Donnell, Daniela Ruah, and LL Cool J with an ensemble cast, as it follows the exploits of the LA-based Office of Special Projects (OSP), an elite division of the Naval Criminal Investigative Service (NCIS) that specializes in undercover assignments. NCIS: Los Angeles is the first spin-off of the successful series NCIS and the second series in the NCIS franchise.

The first NCIS spin-off was announced in 2008 and was introduced via two-part back-door pilot episodes in season six of NCIS. Louise Lombard, who played Lara Macy in the pilot episodes, was not included in the main series. The cast of the first season featured Peter Cambor, Adam Jamal Craig, Linda Hunt and Barrett Foa. Cambor was demoted to recurring status, and Craig's character was killed off at the end of season 1, while Foa was written out at the end of season 12 and Hunt was demoted to "special guest star" status at the beginning of season 13. Other stars in other seasons included Eric Christian Olsen, Renée Felice Smith, Miguel Ferrer, Nia Long, Medalion Rahimi, Caleb Castille, and Gerald McRaney. Cast members from the original NCIS made appearances on the series with Rocky Carroll recurring in the first three seasons, and making an appearance in season six. Cast members from non-NCIS shows had also made appearances, specifically in a crossover event with Hawaii Five-0.

NCIS: Los Angeles received generally mixed-to-positive reviews from critics, but became a solid ratings hit for CBS at the time of its premiere. The series received six Teen Choice Awards for Choice Action Show, Choice TV Actress Action for Hunt, and Choice TV Actor Action for LL Cool J.

== Premise ==
NCIS: Los Angeles follows Special Agents Sam Hanna (LL Cool J) and G Callen (Chris O'Donnell), undercover agents assigned to the Office of Special Projects, a special branch of the Naval Criminal Investigative Service that specializes in undercover assignments. Sam is an ex-US Navy SEAL and former member of SEAL Team Six and dedicated family man. Callen is a former foster child who became a "legend" under the watchful eye of Operations Manager Henrietta "Hetty" Lange (Linda Hunt). At the start of the series, Sam, Callen, and Hetty are supported by Special Agent Kensi Blye (Daniela Ruah), a hand-to-hand combat specialist, trained sniper and forensic whiz, rookie agent Dominic Vail (Adam Jamal Craig), Operational Psychologist Nate Getz (Peter Cambor) and Technical Operator Eric Beale (Barrett Foa). Vail is abducted by terrorists halfway through season 1 and, following a period of being held hostage, is killed during his rescue mission near the end of the season. Getz, meanwhile, enters training to become an agent in the back-half of the season, and is reassigned during season 2, returning for occasional guest appearances afterwards.

In season 2, LAPD Detective Marty Deeks (Eric Christian Olsen), after helping on several cases late in the prior season, joins the OSP team as a liaison between LAPD and NCIS, replacing Vail as Kensi's partner. He holds this position until departmental reforms in season 12 end up terminating it, after which he completes FLETC training and officially joins NCIS as an Investigator. Over the course of the series, Deeks and Kensi slowly evolve from partners to lovers, with the two marrying in season 10. The two then become foster parents to immigrant teenager Rosa in season 13 and are revealed to be expecting their own baby in the series finale. Also joining the team in season 2 is Intelligence Analyst Nell Jones (Renee Felice Smith), a brilliant agent whom Hetty hopes to have take her place eventually, and who forms a close relationship with Beale.

During season 3, Assistant Director Owen Granger (Miguel Ferrer), an old friend of Hetty's, is assigned to the team as oversight with her, and manages to develop a cordial relationship with the team despite a frosty start. In season 8, Granger falls ill with cancer, coinciding with Ferrer's real-life battle with the disease; following Ferrer's death, Granger is written to flee the hospital while in recovery from a failed assassination attempt, and is later confirmed to died

In season 9, Executive Assistant Director Pacific (EADPAC) Shay Mosley (Nia Long) is assigned to the OSP after Hetty leaves on a personal mission to free an old colleague in Vietnam; the team later rescues her when the mission goes wrong. Mosley, meanwhile, sends the team on an unsanctioned mission to Mexico to rescue her son from her criminal ex-husband at the end of the season; while successful in its goals, the mission results in the death of Mosley's trusted assistant, the wounding of most of the rest of team, and the OSP being put under the microscope during the beginning of season 10; Mosley later accepts full responsibility, resigns and goes into hiding with her son to escape a cartel allied with her ex (whom she had killed during the mission).

During seasons 11 and 12, rookie agents Fatima Nazami (Medalion Rahimi) and Devin Rountree (Caleb Castille) are recruited to the OSP, while Beale and Jones depart for the private sector at the end of the latter season. With Hetty leaving to do damage control from a prior mission, Admiral Hollace Kilbride (Gerald McRaney), who has assisted the OSP in multiple cases, is assigned in her place as Director of Special Operations in season 13. The series ends with Callen marrying long-time love Anna Kolcheck, and him and Sam taking a "side project" mission to find and rescue Hetty with a new team, which includes old teammates Nate and Nell.

== Characters ==
=== Main ===
- Chris O'Donnell as G. Callen, NCIS Special Agent in Charge of the Office of Special Projects
- Peter Cambor as Nate Getz (season 1; recurring seasons 2–8 and 13–14), Operational Psychologist, and later NCIS Special Agent
- Daniela Ruah as Kensi Blye, NCIS Special Agent working for the Office of Special Projects
- Adam Jamal Craig as Dominic Vail (season 1), NCIS Probationary Junior Special Agent and Technical Specialist
- Linda Hunt as Henrietta "Hetty" Lange (seasons 1–12; guest seasons 13–14), NCIS Supervisory Special Agent and Operations Manager of the Office of Special Projects
- LL Cool J as Sam Hanna, NCIS Senior Special Agent and ex–Navy SEAL and second-in-command of the Office of Special Projects
- Barrett Foa as Eric Beale (seasons 1–12), NCIS Technical Operator
- Eric Christian Olsen as Marty Deeks (seasons 2–14; recurring season 1), NCIS Investigator and ex-LAPD detective who previously served as liaison officer for NCIS/LAPD
- Renée Felice Smith as Nell Jones (seasons 2–12; guest season 14), NCIS Special Agent and Intelligence Analyst
- Miguel Ferrer as Owen Granger (seasons 5–8; recurring seasons 3–4), NCIS Assistant Director for Pacific Operations (AD-PAC)
- Nia Long as Shay Mosley (seasons 9–10), NCIS Executive Assistant Director for Pacific Operations (EAD-PAC) and ex-Secret Service Agent
- Medalion Rahimi as Fatima Namazi (seasons 11–14; recurring seasons 10–11), NCIS Special Agent with the Office of Special Projects
- Caleb Castille as Devin Rountree (seasons 12–14; recurring season 11), NCIS Junior Special Agent and ex-FBI Agent
- Gerald McRaney as Hollace Kilbride (seasons 13–14; guest seasons 6 and 11; recurring seasons 10 and 12), ex–US Navy Admiral and NCIS Director of Special Operations

=== Recurring ===
- Rocky Carroll as Leon Vance (seasons 1–3 and 6), the director of NCIS. He initially spent a great amount of time "getting the new LA office up and running", but still returns to ensure the well-being of his agents. Carroll also appears on both NCIS (as a regular), and NCIS: New Orleans. He makes a seventh appearance in "Hunted".
- Brian Avers as Mike Renko (seasons 1 and 3), an agent attached to NCIS's Los Angeles satellite office who often works with OSP. An undercover operative, Renko later reported directly to Owen Granger. The team were fond of him, so it came as a shock when he was gunned down during an operation gone awry in a revenge attack.
- Kathleen Rose Perkins as Rose Schwartz (seasons 1–4), a Los Angeles County Medical Examiner. She often assists the team on their investigations. She is incredibly quirky and develops an affinity for Nate Getz, showing great romantic interest in the psychologist.
- Ronald Auguste as Moe Dusa (seasons 1–2), a man whom Sam first came into contact with in Sudan. A "brother" to Sam, of sorts, he joins a terrorist group and assists in the kidnapping of Dom. Developing a conscience, Moe assists in Dom's escape. He is later found dead by the NCIS agents.
- Vyto Ruginis as Arkady Kolcheck, a retired Russian operative. He is friends with Callen. He considers himself to be of great assistance to the NCIS team but often brings trouble in his wake. He has a daughter, Anastasia, whom he does not know very well.
- Claire Forlani as Lauren Hunter (seasons 2–3), an NCIS Operations Manager and SSA. Taken in by Hetty as a teenager, Lauren later becomes an NCIS agent and succeeds Hetty for a short time as Special Agent in Charge of OSP. Initially adversarial, the team later warmed to Hunter. She was reassigned following Lange's return but was later kidnapped and murdered by the Chameleon. Her death has a lasting effect on Lange.
- Indira G. Wilson/Aunjanue Ellis as Michelle Hanna aka "Quinn" (seasons 3–8), Sam Hanna's wife, Michelle, is a former deep-cover CIA operative. At the end of the eighth season, Michelle is kidnapped and murdered by Tahir Khaled in a vendetta against Sam.
- Layla Crawford/Kayla Smith as Kamran Hanna (seasons 3−4, 6, 8, and 12), Sam Hanna's daughter
- Christopher Lambert as Marcel Janvier (season 3–5), a serial killer and criminal mastermind. When Marcel is conducting business transactions, his modus operandi is to buy the supplies for his employers and then arrange a drop-off for the merchandise. He is the primary antagonist to Callen during the show's third season and is responsible for the deaths of Hunter and Renko.
- Scott Grimes as Dave Flynn (seasons 4 and 8), an NCIS Special Agent. Initially an NCIS forensic specialist assigned to the elite rapid response NCIS: Red team stationed out of San Diego, Dave later transfers to San Diego's NCIS: Cyber, where he retrains as a senior intelligence analyst.
- Erik Palladino as Vostanik Sabatino (seasons 4–5, 7–8, and 10–14), a CIA Agent. He is arrested by the team while deep undercover. He is friends with Michelle Hanna and later joins Kensi Blye's Afghanistan team. Kensi initially believes him to be her suspect, but she later realizes he is a skilled operative and will be of great use to her. In season 8, it is revealed that Sabatino is working as part of a rogue CIA faction attempting to dismantle the NCIS team.
- Anslem Richardson as Tahir Khaled (seasons 3 and 7–8), a local warlord in Sudan. A war criminal and warlord, he came into conflict with CIA agents and later NCIS agents Sam Hanna and G. Callen when they went to collect evidence about the genocide he was involved in. He is Sam's arch-enemy and began plotting revenge when Sam took his sister, Jada, from him. He is the primary antagonist of the seventh and eighth seasons, and later murders Sam's wife, Michelle, near the end of season eight. He eventually kills himself via bomb in a last (failed) attempt to kill Sam.
- Matthew Del Negro as Jack Simon (seasons 5 and 7), Kensi's ex-fiancé, who was suspected of being a war-criminal known as 'The White Ghost'. Kensi was assigned to assassinate him in the series' fifth season.
- Elizabeth Bogush as CIA Officer Joelle Taylor (seasons 5–13), Callen's ex-girlfriend, she is introduced as a teacher at a private school before it is revealed that she is part of the rogue CIA group tasked with dismantling the Office of Special Projects. In season 9, she, with the help of Callen, Sam, and Nell, fakes her death in order to take down the group behind the rogue CIA group. The group is known as the syndicate.
- Bar Paly as Anastasia "Anna" Kolcheck (seasons 6–14), a freelance NCIS Special Agent and the estranged daughter of Arkady Kolcheck, she is a prospective ATF agent who begins filling in on NCIS missions while Kensi is on medical leave. Following Kensi's return, Anna embarks on a relationship with Callen and joins NCIS as a Special Agent on a freelance basis. Callen proposes to her in the season 13 finale with them marrying in the series finale.
- John M. Jackson as A. J. Chegwidden (seasons 8–9), retired Rear Admiral and former Judge Advocate General of the Navy. A wartime confidant of both Hetty and Granger, Chegwidden served in Vietnam as a Navy Seal. He reenters the NCIS fold at Lange's behest during an investigation into the CIA. Jackson previously appeared as Chegwidden in nine seasons of JAG, and in one episode of NCIS.
- Andrea Bordeaux as Harley Hidoko (season 9), NCIS Special Agent and Executive Assistant to EADPAC Mosley. She starts off as fiercely loyal to her boss, but soon forms a friendship with the rest of the OSP team. At the end of the ninth season, Hidoko goes missing during an off-the-books mission in Mexico to rescue Mosley's son, and is revealed to have been captured and murdered by a cartel allied with Mosley's criminal ex-husband. Her remains are identified at the end of the tenth-season premiere.
- Jeff Kober as Harris Keane (seasons 9–10 and 13), a soldier who served in the CIA contingent led by Hetty and Granger in the Vietnam War. Keane was captured by Viet Cong and held captive for decades until he was rescued along with Hetty by the NCIS LA team.
- Ashley Spillers as Sydney Jones (seasons 9–10), sister of Nell Jones and a specialist for Homeland Security
- Esai Morales as Louis Ochoa (season 10), NCIS Deputy Director who temporarily takes over directing the team in Hetty's absence
- Peter Jacobson as Special Prosecutor John Rogers (seasons 10–11), who arrives at the Los Angeles office to investigate the team, but soon gets pulled into helping them out on their operations
- David James Elliott as Harmon Rabb Jr. (seasons 10–11), a Naval Captain transferred from the Judge Advocate General to the USS Allegiance (Elliot reprised his role from JAG.)
- Catherine Bell as Sarah MacKenzie (seasons 10–11), the former commander of Joint Legal Services Southwest who now acts as the Marine Corps liaison to the U.S. Secretary of State (Bell reprised her role from JAG.)
- Sasha Clements as Katya Miranova (season 13), nemesis of Callen and Anna
- Natalia del Riego as Rosa Reyes (seasons 13–14), a teenage migrant seeking asylum, who is later fostered by Kensi and Deeks
- Kavi Ramachandran Ladnier as Shyla Dahr (seasons 13–14), NCIS Reserve Agent and Namazi's analyst partner in OSP
- Richard Gant as Colonel (retd.) Raymond Hanna (seasons 13–14), Sam's father

=== Crossover ===
==== Hawaii Five-0 ====
- Scott Caan as Detective Sergeant Danny "Danno" Williams, a member of the Hawaii Five-0 task force
- Daniel Dae Kim as Detective Lieutenant Chin Ho Kelly, member of the Hawaii Five-0 task force

==== NCIS ====
- Michael Weatherly as Anthony DiNozzo, NCIS Senior Field Agent
- Pauley Perrette as Abby Sciuto, NCIS Forensic Specialist
- Gary Cole as Alden Parker, NCIS Supervisory Special Agent
- Wilmer Valderrama as Nick Torres, NCIS Special Agent

==== NCIS: Hawaiʻi ====
- Vanessa Lachey as Jane Tennant, Special Agent-in-Charge of the NCIS: Hawaiʻi Field Office
- Yasmine Al-Bustami as Lucy Tara, Junior Field Agent of NCIS: Hawaiʻi

=== Other ===
- Louise Lombard as Lara Macy, a former Military Police Lieutenant and the Supervisory Special Agent of OSP, Macy was relieved of her position sometime between the pilot episode and the beginning of season one. Hetty remarks she was sent to Djibouti in retaliation for insubordination regarding budget, although the truthfulness of this is unknown. After a short time working with an NCIS satellite division, Macy is found dead in an NCIS episode, murdered as part of a vendetta against Washington Special Agent Leroy Jethro Gibbs. Lombard was not picked up as a regular in the new series and the character was killed in the NCIS episode "Patriot Down".

== Episodes ==
Season	Episodes	Originally released	
Season	Episodes	First released	Last released
Intro	2	April 28, 2009	May 5, 2009
1	24	September 22, 2009	May 25, 2010
2	24	September 21, 2010	May 17, 2011
3	24	September 20, 2011	May 15, 2012
4	24	September 25, 2012	May 14, 2013
5	24	September 24, 2013	May 13, 2014
6	24	September 29, 2014	May 18, 2015
7	24	September 21, 2015	May 2, 2016
8	24	September 25, 2016	May 14, 2017
9	24	October 1, 2017	May 20, 2018
10	24	September 30, 2018	May 19, 2019
11	22	September 29, 2019	April 26, 2020
12	18	November 8, 2020	May 23, 2021
13	22	October 10, 2021	May 22, 2022
14	21	October 9, 2022	May 21, 2023

=== Crossovers ===
Crossover between			Episode	Type	Actors crossing over	Date aired
Series A	Series B	Series C	Episode	Type	Actors crossing over	Date aired
NCIS: Los Angeles	NCIS		"Random on Purpose" (NCIS: Los Angeles 1.9)	Guest appearance	Appearing in Series A: Pauley Perrette	November 24, 2009
Abby Sciuto appears in order to help the OSP team catch a killer with extremely random motives.
Hawaii Five-0	NCIS: Los Angeles		"Ka Hakaka Maikaʻi" (Hawaii Five-0 2.6)	Guest appearance	Appearing in Series A: Daniela Ruah	October 24, 2011
Main article: Ka Hakaka Maikaʻi Joe White calls in Agent Kensi Blye to review the video of John McGarrett, Governor Jameson, and Wo Fat for Steve McGarrett from the Hawaii Five-0 task force, but only recognizes the word "Shelburne".
Hawaii Five-0	NCIS: Los Angeles		"Pa Make Loa" (Hawaii Five-0 2.21) "Touch of Death" (NCIS: Los Angeles 3.21)	2-Part Crossover	Appearing in Series A: Chris O'Donnell, LL Cool J, Craig Robert Young Appearing in Series B: Scott Caan, Daniel Dae Kim	April 30, 2012 May 1, 2012
Main article: Touch of Death (crossover event) Agents Sam Hanna and G. Callen are called in to assist the Hawaii Five-0 task force in finding a suspect, Dracul Comescu. Later, Callen and Sam must return to Los Angeles to stop a possible smallpox outbreak from becoming a reality with Danny Williams and Chin Ho Kelly from Hawaii coming along to help.
Scorpion	NCIS: Los Angeles		"True Colors" (Scorpion 1.06)	Guest appearance	Appearing in Series A: Linda Hunt	October 27, 2014
Hetty Lange assists Scorpion, a team of geniuses, in tracking down a painting after a suspected counterfeit is found at a museum.
NCIS: Los Angeles	NCIS		"Blame It on Rio" (NCIS: Los Angeles 7.5)	Guest appearance	Appearing in Series A: Michael Weatherly	October 19, 2015
Washington NCIS Special Agent Anthony DiNozzo (Michael Weatherly) partners with the Los Angeles team to search the city after his prisoner escapes the custody of a U.S. Marshal on a flight from Singapore to Los Angeles.
NCIS: Los Angeles	JAG		"Payback" (NCIS: Los Angeles 8.15)	Guest appearance	Appearing in Series A: John M. Jackson	February 19, 2017
As the team races to save Kensi from Ferris/Sullivan, they find themselves questioning who they can trust when old faces resurface.
NCIS: Los Angeles	JAG		"Battle Scars" (NCIS: Los Angeles 8.21)	Guest appearance	Appearing in Series A: John M. Jackson	April 23, 2017
When a veteran kidnaps a corrupt VA administrator, the team must work with old friends of Hetty's, one of which being A.J. Chegwidden to find him and figure out what's going on.
NCIS: Los Angeles	JAG		"Golden Days" (NCIS: Los Angeles 8.22)	Guest appearance	Appearing in Series A: John M. Jackson	April 30, 2017
The team works with Hetty's former Vietnam War colleagues to recover $40 million in stolen gold, though things get complicated when other parties invest themselves into the search. Deeks receives some surprising news from Detective Whiting about his IA case.
NCIS: Los Angeles	JAG		"This Is What We Do" (NCIS: Los Angeles 9.08)	Guest appearance	Appearing in Series A: John M. Jackson	November 19, 2017
When a group of migrants and Border Patrol officers are slaughtered near Camp Pendleton, the team discovers that the killers are there for one of their old enemies; Nell must work with her bossy older sister Sydney, a Homeland Security analyst.
NCIS: Los Angeles	JAG		"Các Tù Nhân" (NCIS: Los Angeles 9.13)	Guest appearance	Appearing in Series A: John M. Jackson	January 14, 2018
Eric and Nell find a cryptic clue Hetty left behind in a book that points to Ho Chi Minh City, Vietnam. At first, they clash with Mosley as they try to find out what Hetty is doing there, but Mosley comes around and gets them tickets to Vietnam. Meanwhile, Hetty tries to look insane while being interrogated by her "buyer", who is after the secret information she has. The title of the episode, "Các Tù Nhân", is Vietnamese for "Prisoners".
NCIS: Los Angeles	JAG		"Goodbye, Vietnam" (NCIS: Los Angeles 9.14)	Guest appearance	Appearing in Series A: John M. Jackson	January 21, 2018
The OSP team must work with Hetty's old unit to locate her before she is sold off, while Nell and Eric must work with Sydney to uncover information that would help the team.
NCIS: Los Angeles	JAG		"The Guardian" (NCIS: Los Angeles 10.23)	Guest appearance	Appearing in Series A: David James Elliott	May 12, 2019
Callen and Sam travel to the USS Allegiance in the Persian Gulf to work with Navy Captain Harmon Rabb Jr. when the team uncovers a terror threat on military locations.
NCIS: Los Angeles	JAG		"False Flag" (NCIS: Los Angeles 10.24)	Guest appearance	Appearing in Series A: David James Elliott, Catherine Bell	May 19, 2019
Callen, Hanna, and Rabb detain several terror suspects on board the Allegiance but are simultaneously forced to deal with Iranian forces amassing on the Iraqi border; Sarah MacKenzie helps the rest of the team untangle a complicated spy web involving a crooked Russian diplomat, Chechen terrorists, and an increasingly meddlesome ISIS; Eric is conflicted between being there for Nell and her mother in the hospital and scrambling to neutralize the terror threat and prevent World War III.
NCIS: Los Angeles	JAG		"Let Fate Decide" (NCIS: Los Angeles 11.01)	Guest appearance	Appearing in Series A: David James Elliott, Catherine Bell	September 29, 2019
Callen and Sam work with Navy Capt. Harmon Rabb Jr. to apprehend spies aboard the USS Allegiance; Hetty tries to neutralize a missile attack in the Middle East; Kensi and Deeks are trapped in a mobile CIA unit in Iraq while under attack.
NCIS: Los Angeles	JAG		"Code of Conduct" (NCIS: Los Angeles 11.22)	Guest appearance	Appearing in Series A: Catherine Bell	April 26, 2020
Sam, Callen and Roundtree travel to Afghanistan to help with a sensitive case after two Navy SEALs claim their chief murdered an unarmed prisoner. Note: This episode served as the de facto season finale due to the COVID-19 pandemic.
NCIS	NCIS: Hawaiʻi	NCIS: Los Angeles	"Too Many Cooks" (NCIS 20.10) "Deep Fake" (NCIS: Hawaiʻi 2.10) "A Long Time Coming" (NCIS: Los Angeles 14.10)	3-Part Crossover	Appearing in Series A: Vanessa Lachey, Noah Mills, Chris O'Donnell, LL Cool J Appearing in Series B: Chris O'Donnell, LL Cool J, Gary Cole, Brian Dietzen Appearing in Series C: Vanessa Lachey, Yasmine Al-Bustami, Gary Cole, Wilmer Valderrama	January 9, 2023
Agents from DC, Los Angeles and Hawaii find themselves united in DC to jointly investigate the suicide of a retiring FLETC instructor. Hanna, Tennant and Dr. Palmer are later kidnapped and flown to Hawaii by the CIA and learn that an old CIA assassin group-that their FLETC instructor and Admiral Kilbride were a part of-is being hunted down by a rogue officer. Torres, Parker, Tara and Tennant later travel to Los Angeles to help search for Kilbride, who has gone MIA.
NCIS: Hawaiʻi	NCIS: Los Angeles		"Dies Irae" (NCIS: Hawai'i 2.22)	Guest appearance	Appearing in Series A: LL Cool J	May 22, 2023
Jane Tennant and Kate Whistler travel to South America to figure out who's after Tennant after her CIA past comes to haunt her. Sam comes to their aide when Tennant finds herself in trouble.
NCIS: Hawaiʻi	NCIS: Los Angeles		NCIS: Hawai'i S3	Guest (recurring) appearance	Appearing in Series A: LL Cool J	February 14, 2024 - May 6, 2024
Sam Hanna appears in Hawai'i for multiple reasons (Secret Team, helping Tennant back into work) and decides to stick around in Hawai'i for a while and stay with the Hawai'i team and help with cases.
NCIS	NCIS: Hawaiʻi	NCIS: Los Angeles	"A Thousand Yards" (NCIS 21.07)	Guest appearances	Appearing in Series A: Daniela Ruah, Vanessa Lachey	April 15, 2024
Kensi Blye and Jane Tennant talked to Special Agent Torres via MTAC video chat and told Torres that they were here to help with a case that brought back a lot of NCIS history.
NCIS	NCIS: Los Angeles		"After the Storm" (NCIS 22.18)	Guest appearance	Appearing in Series A: LL Cool J	April 21, 2025
When three combat vets are found dead in a D.C. motel room, the team finds a suspect who will only talk to Sam Hanna.

== Production ==
=== Development ===
Development of the first spin-off of NCIS was reported in November 2008, when CBS announced plans for a new series set in Los Angeles that would be introduced through a two-part backdoor pilot during the sixth season of NCIS.

Series creator Shane Brennan conceived the project after succeeding Donald P. Bellisario as showrunner of NCIS. Brennan had previously created the character of Special Agent G. Callen as a CIA operative for an unrelated series that was never produced. When the opportunity arose to develop an NCIS spin-off, he adapted Callen into the lead character and built the series around him. Brennan envisioned the new series as having a contemporary, undercover-oriented tone inspired by Miami Vice, with Callen and former Navy SEAL Sam Hanna serving as dual protagonists. Unlike the flagship series, which centered on a traditional investigative team led by Leroy Jethro Gibbs, the spin-off focused on the Office of Special Projects (OSP), a covert division specializing in undercover operations, surveillance, and high-risk assignments.

The spin-off underwent several working titles during development. It was initially known as NCIS: Legend, referring to the title of the introductory NCIS episodes, while other proposed titles included OSP: Office of Special Projects, NCIS: OSP, and NCIS: Undercover.

The two-part NCIS episode "Legend", which aired on April 28 and May 5, 2009, served as the backdoor pilot for the series, mirroring the manner in which NCIS itself had been introduced through a two-part episode of JAG.

Following the success of the pilot, CBS officially ordered the series in May 2009 as part of its 2009–10 television schedule.

On January 20, 2023, CBS announced that the series would conclude with its fourteenth season. The series finale aired on May 21, 2023.

=== Casting ===
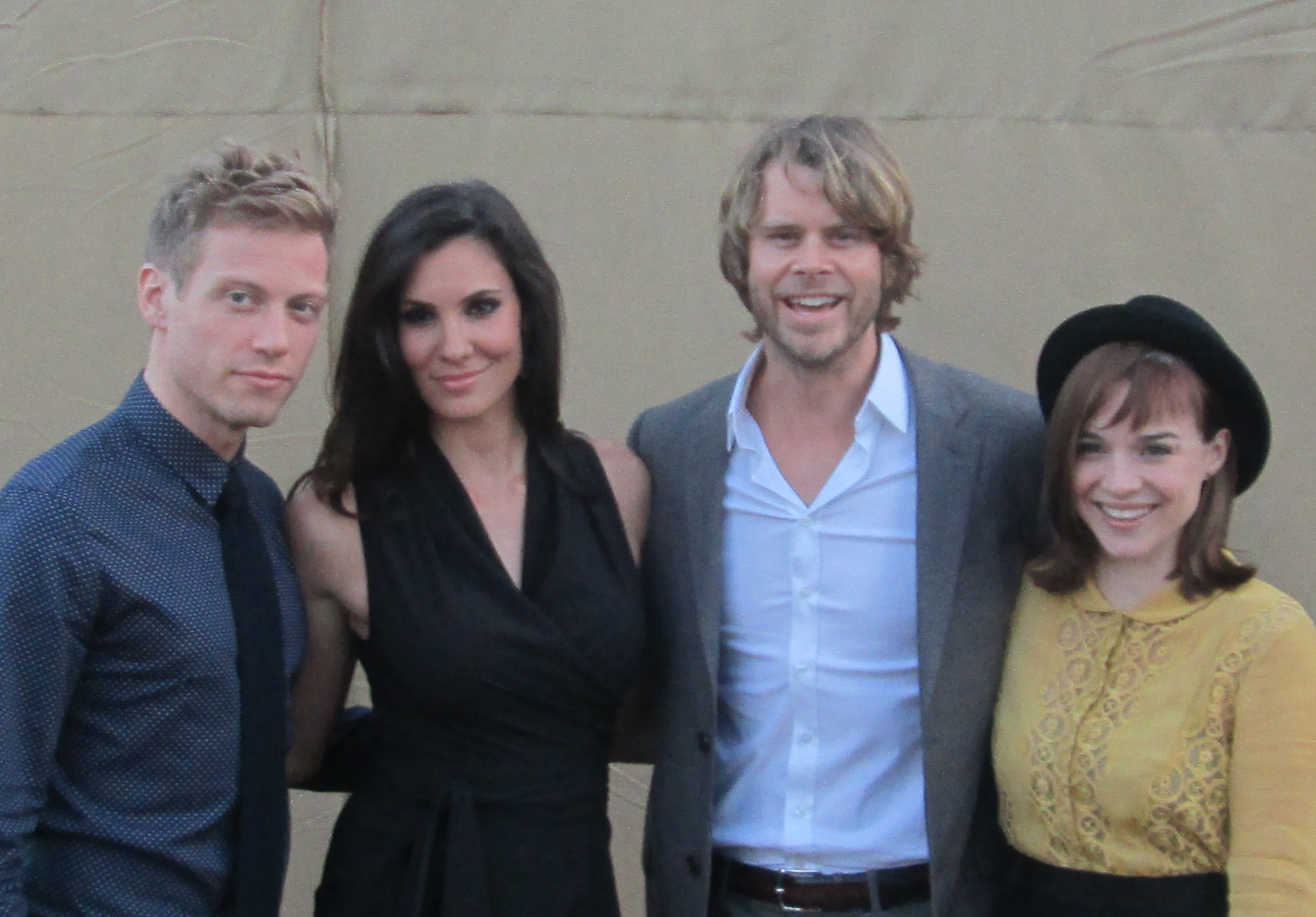
Part of the cast in 2012 (from left): Barrett Foa, Daniela Ruah, Eric Christian Olsen and Renée Felice Smith

Chris O'Donnell and LL Cool J were cast as Special Agents G. Callen and Sam Hanna, respectively, forming the series' central partnership. Their characters debuted in the NCIS backdoor pilot before returning as the leads of the spin-off.

The backdoor pilot also featured Louise Lombard as Special Agent Lara Macy, who headed the Office of Special Projects during its introduction. Although Macy served as a counterpart to Leroy Jethro Gibbs in establishing continuity between the two series, the character did not continue into the regular series after Brennan revised the concept to focus on the partnership between Callen and Hanna.

The principal cast for the series included Peter Cambor as Nate Getz, Daniela Ruah as Kensi Blye, Adam Jamal Craig as Dominic Vail, Barrett Foa as Eric Beale, and Linda Hunt as Operations Manager Henrietta "Hetty" Lange. Following the first season, Renée Felice Smith joined the cast as intelligence analyst Nell Jones, while Eric Christian Olsen, who had recurred as Marty Deeks, was promoted to the main cast beginning with the second season.

Over the course of its fourteen-season run, the series introduced numerous additions to its ensemble, including Miguel Ferrer, Medalion Rahimi, Caleb Castille, Gerald McRaney, and others in recurring and starring roles.

=== Filming ===
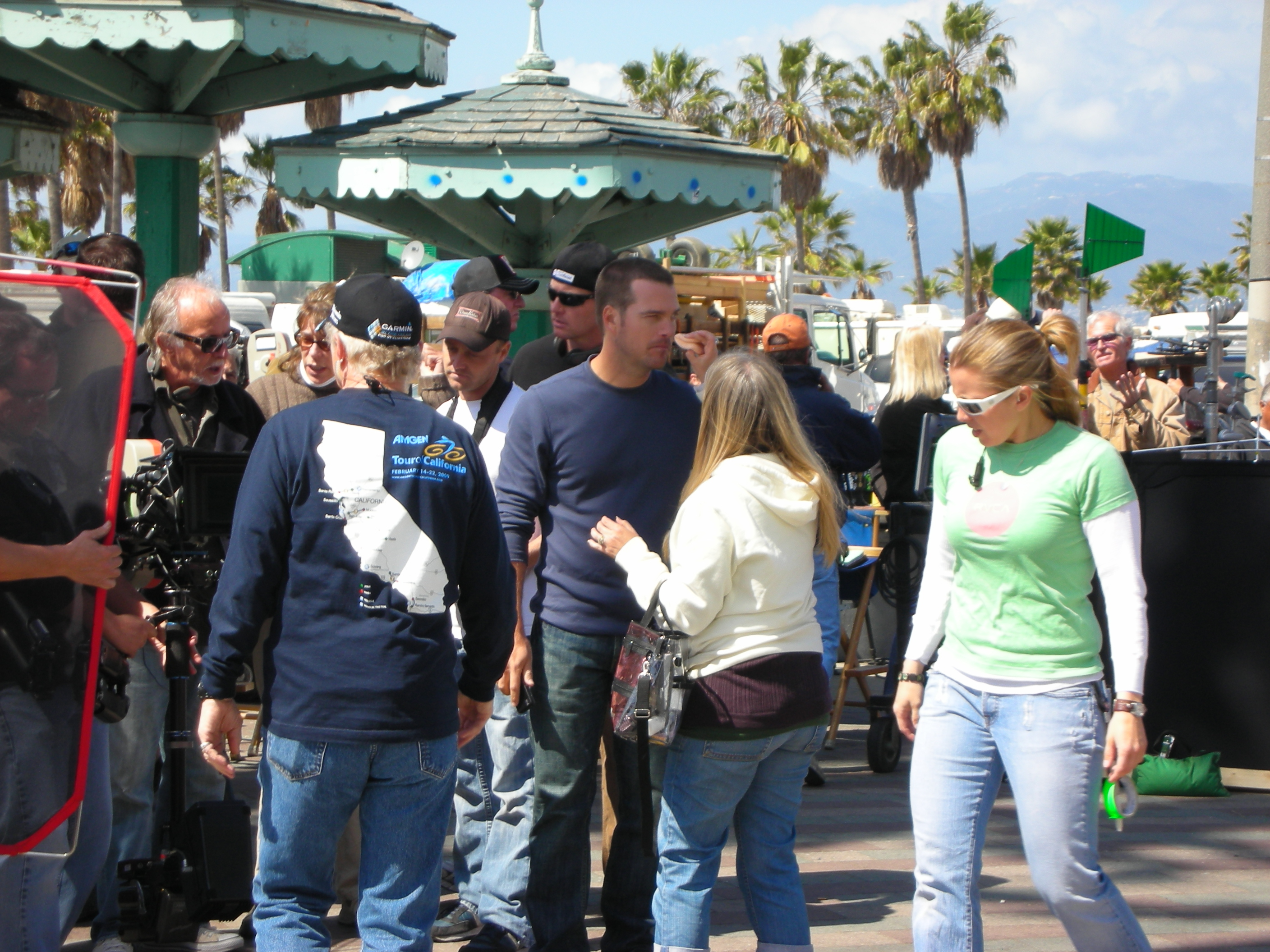
Filming the pilot episode in 2009

Principal photography for the backdoor pilot began in February 2009 before production transitioned to the weekly series following CBS's pickup.

Although set primarily in Los Angeles, the series was filmed largely at Paramount Studios in Hollywood, with extensive location shooting throughout Southern California. Exterior filming regularly took place in Los Angeles, Long Beach, San Pedro, Malibu, and other surrounding communities, allowing the production to showcase recognizable landmarks, beaches, ports, military facilities, and urban neighborhoods.

To reflect the clandestine nature of the Office of Special Projects, the production incorporated purpose-built standing sets, including the team's headquarters, operations center, interrogation rooms, armory, and garage, alongside frequent use of practical locations. The series combined location photography with studio work, practical effects, stunt sequences, and visual effects to depict military operations, counterterrorism missions, and undercover investigations.

Throughout its run, NCIS: Los Angeles maintained one of the largest production footprints among CBS dramas, with extensive stunt coordination, vehicle work, and action choreography becoming defining features of the series' visual style.

=== Lawsuit ===
In April 2011, NCIS creator Donald Bellisario sued CBS over NCIS: Los Angeles because of his contract which gave him "first opportunity" to develop a spin-off or sequel; the lawsuit was dismissed by a judge in June 2012. However, discussions continued between CBS and Bellisario, and in January 2013 the dispute was settled outside of court a week before it was set to go to trial; the terms of the agreement were not disclosed but were described as being amicable.

== Broadcast ==
The series premiered in the United States on CBS on September 22, 2009. In Canada, the series aired on Global like its sister series. In Asia, the series airs on AXN, AXN, and TVOne Pakistan. In the UK the series premieres its latest season first on Sky 1, with subsequent runs and repeats then also broadcast on Channel 5. In the Netherlands the series airs on NET5. NCIS: Los Angeles airs on Network 10, 10 Bold, Paramount+ and TVH!TS (formerly TV1). As of December 2019, it airs on Fox Crime after TV H!TS was rebranded as Fox One in Australia. In Israel it airs on Hot zone and yes HBO. In Portugal the series airs on Fox. It was next broadcast on M6 in France, 13th Street in Denmark and Germany, and Rai 2 in Italy. It was broadcast on Fox in Russia and FX in Greece

== Home media ==
The first nine seasons have been released on DVD in Regions 1, 2, and 4, and Season 1 was released on Blu-ray Disc in Region A. The first season DVD release includes the two-part pilot episode that aired as part of the sixth season of NCIS, which were also included on the Season 6 DVD of NCIS. All releases are distributed by Paramount Home Entertainment.

== Reception ==
=== Critical reception ===
"Identity", the series' first episode, garnered 18.73 million viewers with a 4.4/11 share in the 18- to 49-year-old demographic and therefore won its timeslot. It was the second-most-watched show of the week, behind only the original NCIS.

Reviews for the show have been mixed. It has a score of 59/100 on Metacritic. According to Mary McNamara of the Los Angeles Times, "The crime is intriguing and multifaceted, its resolution requiring a nice balance of street smarts and lots of gunfire. But as with the original 'NCIS', the emphasis is on the characters of the team... Los Angeles, meanwhile, looks fabulous, a pleasing mixture of noir and gridlock, and there's an air of stability that's comforting in these uncertain times." The New York Daily News reviewer, David Hinckley, was more critical of the show saying that although "It all adds up to an hour of decent entertainment, and there's room for enough character development to give 'NCIS: Los Angeles' a personality of its own, ... a premiere episode shouldn't feel even a little like something we've already seen."

Tom Shales of The Washington Post felt that, "NCIS: Los Angeles gets the job done ... It's a procedural that follows strictly the established procedure, but it has likable characters, dislikable bad guys and the occasional flabbergasting shot of L.A." Robert Bianco of USA Today summarized it as a "serviceable hour that takes the NCIS formula—a light tone and a lot of banter wrapped around a fairly rudimentary investigatory plot—and transfers it to a special, undercover NCIS division in Los Angeles. Nothing more, but also nothing less." The Hollywood Reporter compared the show to The A-Team with "the same lighthearted approach to life-or-death situations. Maybe the biggest change is that 'NCIS: L.A.' achieves its inevitably favorable outcomes with a little more intellect and a little less testosterone." IGN stated that although "NCIS: Los Angeles doesn't exactly reinvent the police procedural... it's another above-average entry, aided by the fact that the people behind the show know what they're doing" and ultimately gave the episode a 7.7/10. On the website of IMDb, the series has a score of 6,8/10 on 57 000 critics.

=== Ratings ===
Seasonal rankings (based on average total viewers per episode) of NCIS: Los Angeles on CBS.

Note: Each U.S. network television season starts in late September and ends in late May, which coincides with the completion of the May sweeps.

Viewership and ratings per season of NCIS: Los Angeles
Season	Timeslot (ET)	Episodes	First aired		Last aired		TV season	Viewership rank	Avg. viewers (millions)
Season	Timeslot (ET)	Episodes	Date	Viewers (millions)	Date	Viewers (millions)	TV season	Viewership rank	Avg. viewers (millions)
1	Tuesday 9:00 p.m.	24	September 22, 2009	18.73	May 25, 2010	13.23	2009–10	9	16.08
2	Tuesday 9:00 p.m.	24	September 21, 2010	15.76	May 17, 2011	15.61	2010–11	7	16.54
3	Tuesday 9:00 p.m.	24	September 20, 2011	16.71	May 15, 2012	15.19	2011–12	7	16.01
4	Tuesday 9:00 p.m.	24	September 25, 2012	16.74	May 14, 2013	13.52	2012–13	4	17.31
5	Tuesday 9:00 p.m.	24	September 24, 2013	16.35	May 13, 2014	14.85	2013–14	4	16.03
6	Monday 10:00 p.m.	24	September 29, 2014	9.48	May 18, 2015	9.33	2014–15	27	11.72
7	Monday 10:00 p.m.	24	September 21, 2015	7.89	May 2, 2016	8.10	2015–16	24	11.11
8	Sunday 8:00 p.m.	24	September 25, 2016	10.34	May 14, 2017	9.40	2016–17	11	12.51
9	Sunday 9:00 p.m. (Note: The first episode of season nine and third episode of season ten which aired at 9:30 p.m., the season finale of season 9 which aired at 8:00 p.m. and the twenty first to twenty four episode of season ten aired at 10:00 p.m., with the last episode of season 11 at 10:00 p.m.)	24	October 1, 2017	8.95	May 20, 2018	7.82	2017–18	21	10.71
10	Sunday 9:00 p.m.	24	September 30, 2018	8.75	May 19, 2019	5.28	2018–19	24	10.16
11	Sunday 9:00 p.m.	22	September 29, 2019	6.44	April 26, 2020	5.26	2019–20	26	8.91
12	Sunday 8:00 p.m. (1–9); Sunday 9:00 p.m. (10–18)	18	November 8, 2020	6.35	May 23, 2021	6.18	2020–21	22	7.80
13	Sunday 9:00 p.m. (Note: Due to NFL overruns, the second, third, and eighth episodes aired at Sunday 9:30 p.m. Additionally, the thirteenth and eighteenth episodes were scheduled outside of their regular timeslot, at Sunday 8:00 p.m.)	22	October 10, 2021	5.85	May 22, 2022	4.44	2021–22	26	7.28
14	Sunday 10:00 p.m. (Note: Due to NFL overruns, the series timeslot varies between Sunday 9:00 p.m. to 11:00 p.m.)	21	October 9, 2022	4.33	May 21, 2023	5.24	2022–23	27	6.42

=== Awards and nominations ===
Year	Association	Category	Nominee(s)	Result	Ref.
2010	People's Choice Awards	Favorite New TV Drama	–	Nominated	
2010	Teen Choice Awards	Choice Action Show	–	Won	
2010	Teen Choice Awards	Choice Actor Action	LL Cool J	Nominated	
2010	Teen Choice Awards	Choice Actress Action	Daniela Ruah	Nominated	
2010	Golden Globes (Portugal)	Revelation	Daniela Ruah	Won	
2011	Teen Choice Awards	Choice Action Show	–	Won	
2011	Teen Choice Awards	Choice Actor Action	LL Cool J	Nominated	
2011	Teen Choice Awards	Choice Actress Action	Linda Hunt	Won	
2012	Primetime Emmy Awards	Outstanding Stunt Direction	Troy James Brown	Nominated	
2012	Teen Choice Awards	Choice Action Show	–	Nominated	
2012	Teen Choice Awards	Choice Actor Action	LL Cool J	Nominated	
2012	Teen Choice Awards	Choice Actress Action	Linda Hunt	Won	
2013	Teen Choice Awards	Choice Action Show	–	Won	
2013	Teen Choice Awards	Choice Actor Action	LL Cool J	Won	
2014	Image Awards	Outstanding Actor in a Drama Series	LL Cool J	Nominated	
2014	Location Managers Guild International Awards	Outstanding Film Commission		Nominated	
2014	Location Managers Guild International Awards	Outstanding Location Television Program		Nominated	
2014	Young Artist Awards	Best Performance in a TV Series Guest Starring Young Actor 14-16	Owen Teague	Nominated	
2014	Prism Awards	Male Performance in a Drama Series Multi-Episode Storyline	LL Cool J	Nominated	
2014	Prism Awards	Male Performance in a Drama Series Multi-Episode Storyline	Eric Christian Olsen	Nominated	
2014	Prism Awards	Drama Series Multi-Episode Storyline - Mental Health		Nominated	
2015	California on Location Awards	Assistant Location Manager of the Year - Television	Dorion Thomas	Won	
2015	Image Awards	Outstanding Actor in a Drama Series	LL Cool J	Nominated	
2015	Location Managers Guild International Awards	Outstanding Locations in a Contemporary Television Series	Tony Salome & Jason Savage	Nominated	
2015	Telly Awards	Best Director	Robert Florio	Won	

== Potential spin-off ==
On November 5, 2012, Deadline Hollywood reported the first news about a spin-off of NCIS: Los Angeles titled NCIS: Red. The new characters were introduced during a two-part episode of NCIS: Los Angeles. The spin-off was to feature a team of mobile agents, who travel around the country to solve crimes. This would have been the second successive spin-off in the NCIS franchise. However, on May 15, 2013, CBS confirmed that NCIS: Red was officially passed on and would not be moving forward. Scott Grimes reprised his potential spin-off role as NCIS: Red Agent Dave Flynn during the eighth season of NCIS: Los Angeles.

== Adaptations ==
In August 2016, Titan Books published NCIS Los Angeles: Extremis, a novel by Jerome Preisler. Three months later, it was followed by NCIS Los Angeles: Bolthole, written by Jeff Mariotte. Both books contain original stories featuring the characters from the show.
