= Peter Cambor =

American film and television actor

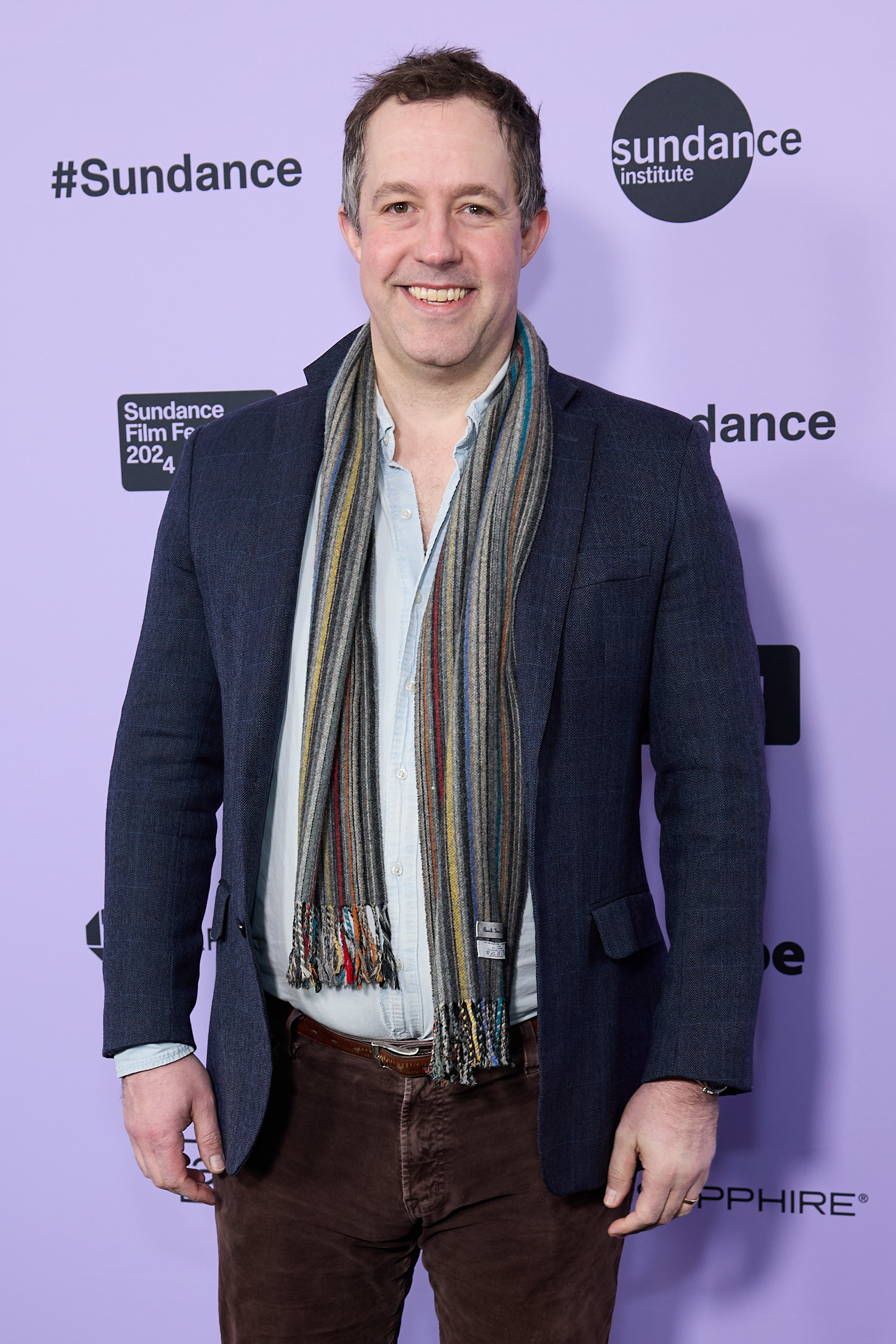
- Peter Cambor at the 2024 Sundance Film Festival
- Born: September 28, 1978 (age 47); Houston, Texas, U.S.
- Education: Wesleyan University (BA); Harvard University (MFA)
- Occupation: Actor
- Years active: 2002–present

Peter Cambor (born September 28, 1978) is an American actor, writer, and producer. He is best known for his portrayal of Barry on Grace and Frankie and operational psychologist Nate Getz on the CBS show NCIS: Los Angeles.

Cambor appeared on the former ABC sitcom Notes from the Underbelly for two seasons. In 2012, he starred in the TBS series Wedding Band.

== Early life ==
Cambor studied at Deerfield Academy in Massachusetts and at Wesleyan University in Middletown, Connecticut, where he earned a BA degree in English in 2001. After further studies, Peter Cambor received an MFA from the American Repertory Theater's Institute for Advanced Theater Training at Harvard University, Cambridge, Massachusetts (MFA in Acting, 2005). After working for a while in New York, he moved to Los Angeles.

== Career ==
Cambor landed the lead as an expectant father on Notes from the Underbelly after the sitcom's creator saw his performance in a Los Angeles production of The Cherry Orchard opposite veteran actors Annette Bening and Alfred Molina. Cambor starred opposite Jennifer Westfeldt from 2006 to 2008.

Cambor played Sam in the 2018 film Forever My Girl.

Between 2009 and 2023, Cambor appeared as a recurring cast member on NCIS: Los Angeles as Nate Getz, an operations psychologist in the Office of Special Projects. The role originated during a two-episode arc of NCIS, "Legend (Part 1)" and "Legend (Part 2)".

Cambor has played the recurring role of Barry, Brianna's boyfriend, on Grace and Frankie since 2015. He also appears in some episodes of Suits as Nathan, director of a legal clinic.

Cambor is the co-founder of District 33, a production and development company in Los Angeles. He was an executive producer on the Quibi documentary series "Blackballed", about Donald Sterling's expulsion from the NBA for racist comments he made during the 2014 season.
