= Renée Felice Smith =

American actress (born 1985)

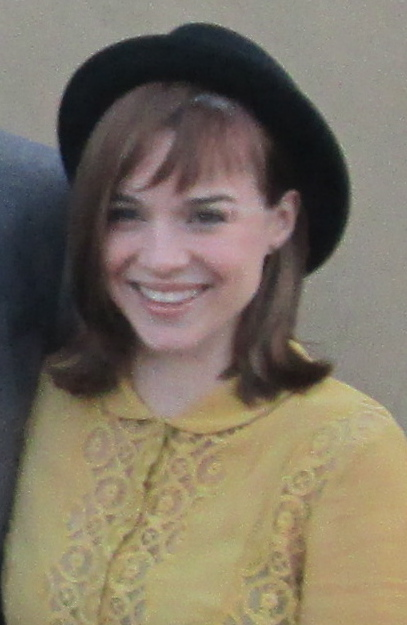
- Smith in 2012
- Born: Renée Felice Smith; January 16, 1985 (age 41); New York City, New York, United States
- Occupations: Actress; director; producer
- Years active: 2008–present

Renée Felice Smith (born January 16, 1985) is an American actress, director, and producer best known for her lead role as Nell Jones on the CBS military action drama series NCIS: Los Angeles (2010–19). Smith made her first appearance during its second season and remained a series regular until its twelfth season, but returned for a guest appearance in the series finale. She is also known for her role as Missy in the psychological drama film Detachment (2011).

== Early life ==
Smith was born in New York City of mixed Irish-Italian descent. She attended Patchogue-Medford High School on Long Island, New York, as well as the Tisch School of the Arts at New York University, graduating with honors, majoring in journalism and minoring in history, Stonestreet Studios Conservatory and the Lee Strasberg Institute.

While at NYU, she co-created the student dance troupe, Pulse Dance Project.

== Career ==
Smith's first acting job was a national television commercial for Danone yogurt in 1991 at age six.

Smith started off in theatre, having made her debut in Second Stage's Wildflower. She was cast for a sitcom on The CW directed by Amy Sherman-Palladino, tentatively titled Wyoming, but only a pilot was produced since the project was not picked up by the network. The pilot movie is called The Wyoming Story.

In 2010, Smith was cast to appear as Nell Jones on NCIS: Los Angeles. Initially planned to be only a recurring character, Smith's role was expanded to main cast after she impressed the producers with her acting. Following the show's twelfth season, she left the show. Smith reprised the role of Nell as a guest star in the series finale that aired in May 2023.

In 2011, Smith appeared as a supporting character, Missy, in Detachment. A year later she began co-creating with her partner Christopher Gabriel a children's book series based on her French Bulldog, Hugo.

In April 2014, Smith played the role of Frankie in Code Academy, a short sci-fi production in which young men and women are kept apart until a certain age and in April 2015, she starred in the short film Baby, which she also produced and which premiered at the SXSW Film Festival.

Smith and her partner Christopher Gabriel co-directed their first feature film, The Relationtrip in 2017, which premiered at SXSW in March 2017. In March 2021, Smith and Gabriel released their first picture book entitled, "Hugo and the Impossible Thing".

== Filmography ==
Television roles
Year	Title	Role	Notes
2008	Viralcom	Auditioner	Episode: "I Can't Believe I'm BritGirl16!"
2010–2021; 2023	NCIS: Los Angeles	Nell Jones	Main role; debuted in season 2, episode 4 Guest star; Episode: "New Beginnings, Part Two"
2010	The Wyoming Story	Dinah Thorpe	TV movie; unsold series pilot episode, "The Damn Thorpes"
2015	The Price Is Right	Herself	December 9, 2015
2017	It's Always Sunny in Philadelphia	Belle	Episode: "A Cricket's Tale"

Film roles
Year	Title	Role	Notes
2011	Detachment	Missy	
2014	Nanny Cam	Jess	Also known as Sitter Cam
2014	Code Academy	Frankie	Short film
2015	Baby	Naomi	Short film; also as executive producer
2017	The Relationtrip	Beck	Also executive producer, writer and director Winner: Dallas International Film Festival's Grand Jury Prize for Narrative Feature Competition; Nominated: Nashville Film Festival's Grand Jury Prize Bridgestone Narrative Feature Competition (shared with C.A. Gabriel); SXSW Film Festival's SXSW Adam Yauch Hörnblowér Award (shared with C.A. Gabriel); SXSW Film Festival's SXSW Gamechanger Award
2017	That Thing with the Cat!	Emma	
