= Daniela Ruah =

American-Portuguese actress and director

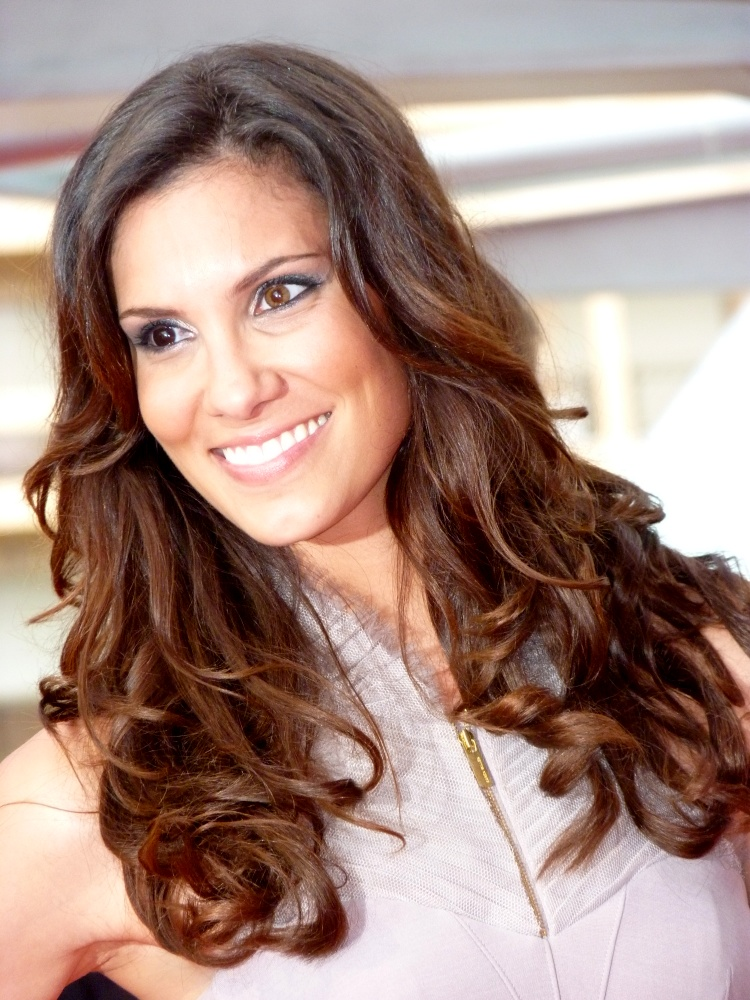
- Ruah at the 2012 Monte-Carlo Television Festival
- Born: Daniela Sofia Korn Ruah; December 2, 1983 (age 42); Boston, Massachusetts, US
- Citizenship: United States • Portugal
- Occupations: Actress; director
- Years active: 2000–present
- Spouse: David Paul Olsen (m. 2014)
- Children: 2
- Relatives: Eric Christian Olsen (brother-in-law); Sarah Wright (sister-in-law); Artur Carlos de Barros Basto (great-granduncle)

Daniela Sofia Korn Ruah Olsen (born December 2, 1983) is an American-Portuguese actress and film director best known for playing NCIS Special Agent Kensi Blye in the CBS police procedural series NCIS: Los Angeles.

== Early life ==
Ruah was born in Boston, U.S., to Jewish parents from Portugal, where her mother is an otologist and her father is an ENT surgeon. When Ruah was 5, the family moved back to Portugal, where she attended St Julian's School and, at 16, began acting in telenovelas. She won a Portuguese-television dance competition.

Ruah moved to the UK at the age of 18 and earned a Bachelor of Arts in performing arts from London Metropolitan University. She returned to Portugal where she continued acting, and in 2007 moved to New York City to study at the Lee Strasberg Theatre and Film Institute.

Ruah stated that she grew up in an environment that was both Sephardic and Ashkenazi; her father is of Portuguese-Jewish ancestry, and her mother's Jewish roots are in Russia, Ukraine and Portugal. She holds Portuguese and American citizenship.

== Career ==
Ruah started acting in Portuguese soap operas when she was a teen. She made her acting debut at 16, when she played Sara on the soap opera Jardins Proibidos ("Forbidden Gardens").

At 18, Ruah moved to London to attend college. After graduation, she returned to Portugal to pursue her acting career. She was the winner of the celebrity dance competition Dança Comigo (the Portuguese version of Dancing with the Stars) and got main roles in television series, short films, and theatre. In 2007, she moved to New York to study at the Lee Strasberg Theatre and Film Institute.

Ruah starred as Special Agent Kensi Blye in NCIS: Los Angeles, which first aired on September 22, 2009. In 2011, she portrayed the character in a crossover guest appearance on the series Hawaii Five-0. While on NCIS in 2014 Ruah won an award for best on Best Prime-Time Television.

In 2013, Ruah appeared in David Auburn's play Proof at Los Angeles' Hayworth Theatre.

On January 8, 2018, it was confirmed that Ruah would co-host the Eurovision Song Contest 2018 in Lisbon, Portugal alongside Catarina Furtado, Sílvia Alberto and Filomena Cautela.

In January 2026, Deadline Hollywood announced that Ruah would be producing and acting in a screen adaptation of Karen McQuestion's novel, The Moonlight Child. The project is slated for film with the title And Then She Was Gone, and will also feature her co-star from NCIS: Los Angeles, Natalia del Riego. The screenplay was written by Justin Kohlas who will executive produce under his KimberMark banner, alongside Ruah and Riccardo Maddalosso (Armageddon Time).

== Personal life ==
Ruah married David Olsen, the older brother and stunt double of Ruah's NCIS: Los Angeles co-star Eric Christian Olsen, in an interfaith ceremony on June 19, 2014. Olsen is Lutheran. They have a son, River Isaac Ruah Olsen (born December 30, 2013), and a daughter, Sierra Esther Ruah Olsen (born September 4, 2016).

== Filmography ==
=== Acting ===
Films
| Year | Title | Role | Notes |
|---|---|---|---|
| 2012 | Red Tails | Sofia | |
| 2012 | Brave | Merida | European Portuguese Version; Animated Film |

Short Films
| Year | Title | Role | Notes |
|---|---|---|---|
| 2006 | Canaviais | Margarida | Portuguese short film |
| 2008 | Blind Confession | Woman | |
| 2009 | Safe Haven | Angela Bowery | |
| 2009 | Midnight Passion | Sophie | |
| 2011 | Tu & Eu | Sophie | Asians on Film Festival Award for Best Ensemble Cast – Short Film |
| 2016 | Excuse | Brenda | |

Television
| Year | Title | Role | Notes |
|---|---|---|---|
| 2000–2001 | Jardins Proibidos | Sara | Main Cast; Portuguese soap opera broadcast by TVI |
| 2001 | Filha do Mar | Constança Valadas | Main Cast; Portuguese soap opera broadcast by TVI |
| 2001 | Querida Mãe | Zezinha | Portuguese television film broadcast by SIC |
| 2001 | Elsa, Uma Mulher Assim | Mónica | Portuguese miniseries broadcast by RTP; Season 1, Episode 11 |
| 2004 | Inspector Max | Verónica Botelho | Portuguese TV series broadcast by TVI; 1 episode, "Marcas do Passado" |
| 2005–2006 | Dei-te Quase Tudo | Rita Cruz | Main Cast; Portuguese soap opera broadcast by TVI |
| 2006 | Dança Comigo | Herself | Portuguese version of Dancing with the Stars broadcast by RTP; Winner of the first season |
| 2006–2007 | Tu e Eu | Daniela Pinto | Main Cast; Portuguese soap opera broadcast by TVI |
| 2008 | Casos da Vida | Rita | Portuguese TV series broadcast by TVI; 1 episode, "Passo em Falso" |
| 2009 | Guiding Light | Gigi | Season 1, Episode 15628 |
| 2009 | NCIS | Kensi Blye | 2 pilot episodes: "Legend"; She was part of a guest cast including Chris O'Donnell, LL Cool J, Barrett Foa, Peter Cambor and Louise Lombard |
| 2009–2023 | NCIS: Los Angeles | Kensi Blye | Series regular, 277 episodes Golden Globe Award (Portugal) for Newcomer of the Year; TV Action Icon Award 2011 of Celebrity & Stuntwomen's Awards; Nominated-Teen Choice Award for Choice TV Action Actress. |
| 2011 | Hawaii Five-0 | Kensi Blye | Crossover with NCIS: Los Angeles; Episode: "Ka Hakaka Maika'i" |
| 2018 | Eurovision Song Contest 2018 | Herself | Hostess |
| 2020 | A Espia | Maria João Mascarenhas | Main Cast Portuguese miniseries broadcast by RTP |
| 2023 | The Traitors | Herself | Host |
| 2023 | Turn of the Tide | Fátima | Supporting cast Portuguese thriller series from Netflix |

=== Directing ===
| Year | Title | Notes |
|---|---|---|
| 2021–2023 | NCIS: Los Angeles | 6 episodes |
| 2022 | Contado por Mulheres | Portuguese Miniseries |
| 2024 | NCIS | Episode: "Left Unsaid" |
| 2024 | NCIS: Hawaiʻi | Episode: "The Next Thousand" |
| 2025 | The Equalizer | Episode: "Deception" |
