= List of NCIS: Los Angeles episodes =

NCIS: Los Angeles title card

NCIS: Los Angeles is an American television series that premiered on CBS on September 22, 2009. The series is set in Los Angeles, California and follows the stories of the members of the Office of Special Projects, an undercover division of the Naval Criminal Investigative Service (NCIS). The show and its characters were introduced in a two-part episode during the sixth season of the television series NCIS on April 28 and May 5, 2009.

On March 31, 2022, NCIS: Los Angeles was renewed for a fourteenth season. On January 20, 2023, it was announced that the fourteenth season would be its last.

During the course of the series, 323 episodes of NCIS: Los Angeles aired over fourteen seasons, between September 22, 2009, and May 21, 2023.

== Series overview ==
Season	Episodes	Originally released	
Season	Episodes	First released	Last released
Intro	2	April 28, 2009	May 5, 2009
1	24	September 22, 2009	May 25, 2010
2	24	September 21, 2010	May 17, 2011
3	24	September 20, 2011	May 15, 2012
4	24	September 25, 2012	May 14, 2013
5	24	September 24, 2013	May 13, 2014
6	24	September 29, 2014	May 18, 2015
7	24	September 21, 2015	May 2, 2016
8	24	September 25, 2016	May 14, 2017
9	24	October 1, 2017	May 20, 2018
10	24	September 30, 2018	May 19, 2019
11	22	September 29, 2019	April 26, 2020
12	18	November 8, 2020	May 23, 2021
13	22	October 10, 2021	May 22, 2022
14	21	October 9, 2022	May 21, 2023

== Episodes ==
=== Introductory episode(s) ===
NCIS: Los Angeles and its characters were introduced during the sixth-season episodes of NCIS titled "Legend (Part I)" and "Legend (Part II)". These episodes served as a backdoor pilot for the series.

Introductory episodes (NCIS season 6)
No. overall	No. in season	Title	Directed by	Written by	Original release date	Prod. code	U.S. viewers (millions)
135	22	"Legend"	Tony Wharmby	Shane Brennan	April 28, 2009	622	16.70
136	23	"Legend"	James Whitmore Jr.	Shane Brennan	May 5, 2009	623	16.72
NCIS Special Agents Leroy Jethro Gibbs (Mark Harmon) and Timothy McGee (Sean Murray) fly to Los Angeles to work with the NCIS Office of Special Projects—Los Angeles team to solve the murder of a Marine, eventually discovering that the killing is linked to members of a terrorist sleeper cell residing in Los Angeles. The episode ends with OSP agent G. Callen confronting a man who is revealed to be Michael Rivkin, NCIS/Mossad Liaison Officer Ziva David (Cote de Pablo)'s boyfriend and a fellow officer of the Israeli Mossad. Having found that Rivkin is in Los Angeles searching for the same terrorist cell, the NCIS team redouble their efforts to stop Rivkin while attempting to arrest a live member of the cell. Unfortunately, Rivkin complicates things by putting the terrorists to sleep (killing them) before NCIS can catch up to them. Back in D.C., Tony DiNozzo (Michael Weatherly) is forced to question Ziva's loyalty to NCIS in the aftermath of Rivkin's appearance in LA. Note: The result of Callen's injuries is unknown at the end of the episode. However, in the next NCIS episode, "Semper Fidelis", it is revealed that Callen was not killed but is in critical condition on life support.

=== Season 1 (2009–10) ===
- This was the first season to feature 24 episodes.

No. overall	No. in season	Title	Directed by	Written by	Original release date	Prod. code	U.S. viewers (millions)
1	1	"Identity"	James Whitmore Jr.	Shane Brennan	September 22, 2009	101	18.73
2	2	"The Only Easy Day"	Terrence O'Hara	R. Scott Gemmill	September 29, 2009	102	17.40
3	3	"Predator"	Tony Wharmby	Dave Kalstein	October 6, 2009	104	16.31
4	4	"Search and Destroy"	Steve Boyum	Gil Grant	October 13, 2009	105	15.38
5	5	"Killshot"	David M. Barrett	Shane Brennan	October 20, 2009	103	16.48
6	6	"Keepin' It Real"	Leslie Libman	Matt Pyken	November 3, 2009	106	15.29
7	7	"Pushback"	Paris Barclay	Shane Brennan	November 10, 2009	107	16.23
8	8	"Ambush"	Rod Holcomb	Lindsay Sturman	November 17, 2009	108	14.87
9	9	"Random on Purpose"	Steven DePaul	Speed Weed	November 24, 2009	109	17.22
10	10	"Brimstone"	Terrence O'Hara	Teleplay by : R. Scott Gemmill & Gil Grant; Story by : R. Scott Gemmill	December 15, 2009	110	17.50
11	11	"Breach"	Perry Lang	Teleplay by : Shane Brennan & R. Scott Gemmill; Story by : R. Scott Gemmill	January 5, 2010	111	18.07
12	12	"Past Lives"	Elodie Keene	Dave Kalstein	January 12, 2010	112	15.60
13	13	"Missing"	David M. Barrett	Gil Grant & Matt Pyken	January 26, 2010	113	16.94
14	14	"LD50"	Jonathan Frakes	Speed Weed & R. Scott Gemmill	February 2, 2010	114	16.42
15	15	"The Bank Job"	Terrence O'Hara	Dave Kalstein	February 9, 2010	115	17.91
16	16	"Chinatown"	Alan J. Levi	Lindsay Sturman	March 2, 2010	116	14.84
17	17	"Full Throttle"	David M. Barrett	Joseph C. Wilson	March 9, 2010	117	17.00
18	18	"Blood Brothers"	Karen Gaviola	Tim Clemente	March 16, 2010	118	15.10
19	19	"Hand-to-Hand"	Paris Barclay	Matt Pyken	April 6, 2010	119	13.79
20	20	"Fame"	Dennis Smith	Speed Weed	April 27, 2010	120	15.62
21	21	"Found"	James Whitmore Jr.	R. Scott Gemmill	May 4, 2010	121	14.34
22	22	"Hunted"	Steven DePaul	Corey Miller	May 11, 2010	122	16.04
23	23	"Burned"	Steve Boyum	Teleplay by : Gil Grant & Dave Kalstein; Story by : Dave Kalstein	May 18, 2010	123	15.32
24	24	"Callen, G."	Tony Wharmby	Shane Brennan	May 25, 2010	124	13.23

=== Season 2 (2010–11) ===
No. overall	No. in season	Title	Directed by	Written by	Original release date	Prod. code	U.S. viewers (millions)
25	1	"Human Traffic"	James Whitmore Jr.	Shane Brennan	September 21, 2010	201	15.76
26	2	"Black Widow"	Kate Woods	Dave Kalstein	September 21, 2010	202	13.60
27	3	"Borderline"	Terrence O'Hara	R. Scott Gemmill	September 28, 2010	203	16.51
28	4	"Special Delivery"	Tony Wharmby	Gil Grant	October 5, 2010	204	16.14
29	5	"Little Angels"	Steven DePaul	Frank Military	October 12, 2010	205	16.05
30	6	"Standoff"	Dennis Smith	Joseph C. Wilson	October 19, 2010	206	16.00
31	7	"Anonymous"	Norberto Barba	Christina M. Kim	October 26, 2010	207	16.00
32	8	"Bounty"	Félix Alcalá	Dave Kalstein	November 9, 2010	208	15.61
33	9	"Absolution"	Steven DePaul	R. Scott Gemmill	November 16, 2010	209	15.81
34	10	"Deliverance"	Tony Wharmby	Frank Military & Shane Brennan	November 23, 2010	210	14.96
35	11	"Disorder"	Jonathan Frakes	Teleplay by : Gil Grant & Dave Kalstein; Story by : Dave Kalstein	December 14, 2010	211	16.82
36	12	"Overwatch"	Karen Gaviola	Lindsay Jewett Sturman	January 11, 2011	212	18.13
37	13	"Archangel"	Tony Wharmby	R. Scott Gemmill & Shane Brennan	January 18, 2011	213	17.29
38	14	"Lockup"	Jan Eliasberg	Christina M. Kim & Frank Military	February 1, 2011	214	17.70
39	15	"Tin Soldiers"	Terrence O'Hara	R. Scott Gemmill	February 8, 2011	215	17.16
40	16	"Empty Quiver"	James Whitmore Jr.	Dave Kalstein	February 15, 2011	216	16.80
41	17	"Personal"	Kate Woods	Joseph C. Wilson	February 22, 2011	217	18.69
42	18	"Harm's Way"	Tony Wharmby	Shane Brennan	March 1, 2011	218	15.67
43	19	"Enemy Within"	Steven DePaul	Lindsay Jewett Sturman	March 22, 2011	219	16.56
44	20	"The Job"	Terrence O'Hara	Frank Military & Christina M. Kim	March 29, 2011	220	15.34
45	21	"Rocket Man"	Dennis Smith	Roger Director	April 12, 2011	221	15.46
46	22	"Plan B"	James Whitmore Jr.	Dave Kalstein & Joseph C. Wilson	May 3, 2011	222	14.16
47	23	"Imposters"	John Peter Kousakis	R. Scott Gemmill	May 10, 2011	223	14.74
48	24	"Familia"	James Whitmore Jr.	Shane Brennan	May 17, 2011	224	15.61

=== Season 3 (2011–12) ===
No. overall	No. in season	Title	Directed by	Written by	Original release date	Prod. code	US viewers (millions)
49	1	"Lange, H."	Tony Wharmby	Shane Brennan	September 20, 2011	301	16.71
50	2	"Cyber Threat"	Dennis Smith	R. Scott Gemmill	September 27, 2011	302	16.26
51	3	"Backstopped"	Terrence O'Hara	Dave Kalstein & Shane Brennan	October 4, 2011	303	14.78
52	4	"Deadline"	Kate Woods	Gil Grant	October 11, 2011	304	15.40
53	5	"Sacrifice"	John Peter Kousakis	Joseph C. Wilson	October 18, 2011	305	15.35
54	6	"Lone Wolf"	James Whitmore Jr.	Christina M. Kim	October 25, 2011	306	15.89
55	7	"Honor"	Tony Wharmby	Jordana Lewis Jaffe & R. Scott Gemmill	November 1, 2011	307	15.52
56	8	"Greed"	Jan Eliasberg	Frank Military	November 8, 2011	308	15.66
57	9	"Betrayal"	Karen Gaviola	Frank Military	November 15, 2011	309	15.15
58	10	"The Debt"	Steven DePaul	Dave Kalstein	November 22, 2011	310	14.09
59	11	"Higher Power"	Kevin Bray	Joe Sachs	December 13, 2011	311	16.40
60	12	"The Watchers"	Tony Wharmby	R. Scott Gemmill	January 3, 2012	312	17.08
61	13	"Exit Strategy"	Dennis Smith	Gregory Weidman	January 10, 2012	313	16.60
62	14	"Partners"	Eric Laneuville	Gil Grant & Dave Kalstein	February 7, 2012	314	16.27
63	15	"Crimeleon"	Terrence O'Hara	Frank Military	February 14, 2012	315	16.15
64	16	"Blye, K."	Jonathan Frakes	Joseph C. Wilson	February 21, 2012	316	15.47
65	17	"Blye, K., Part 2"	Terrence O'Hara	Dave Kalstein	February 28, 2012	317	15.85
66	18	"The Dragon and the Fairy"	Tony Wharmby	Joe Sachs	March 20, 2012	318	16.17
67	19	"Vengeance"	James Whitmore Jr.	Frank Military	March 27, 2012	319	14.75
68	20	"Patriot Acts"	Dennis Smith	Jordana Lewis Jaffe	April 10, 2012	320	12.86
69	21	"Touch of Death"	Tony Wharmby	Michele Fazekas & Tara Butters & R. Scott Gemmill	May 1, 2012	321	15.21
70	22	"Neighborhood Watch"	Robert Florio	Christina M. Kim	May 8, 2012	322	14.56
71	23	"Sans Voir (Part I)"	John Peter Kousakis	Gil Grant	May 15, 2012	323	15.19
72	24	"Sans Voir (Part II)"	Terrence O'Hara	Shane Brennan	May 15, 2012	324	15.19

=== Season 4 (2012–13) ===
No. overall	No. in season	Title	Directed by	Written by	Original release date	Prod. code	U.S. viewers (millions)
73	1	"Endgame"	Terrence O'Hara	Shane Brennan	September 25, 2012	401	16.74
74	2	"Recruit"	James Whitmore Jr.	R. Scott Gemmill	October 2, 2012	402	14.91
75	3	"The Fifth Man"	John Peter Kousakis	Dave Kalstein	October 9, 2012	403	15.18
76	4	"Dead Body Politic"	Tony Wharmby	Jordana Lewis Jaffe	October 23, 2012	404	16.53
77	5	"Out of the Past"	Dennis Smith	Frank Military	October 30, 2012	405	16.28
78	6	"Rude Awakenings"	Karen Gaviola	Frank Military	November 13, 2012	406	15.77
79	7	"Skin Deep"	Paul A. Kaufman	Gil Grant	November 20, 2012	407	15.13
80	8	"Collateral"	Kate Woods	Cheo Hodari Coker	November 27, 2012	408	14.49
81	9	"The Gold Standard"	Tony Wharmby	Joseph C. Wilson	December 11, 2012	409	15.12
82	10	"Free Ride"	Jonathan Frakes	Tim Clemente & R. Scott Gemmil	December 18, 2012	410	15.48
83	11	"Drive"	Steven DePaul	Joe Sachs	January 8, 2013	411	17.90
84	12	"Paper Soldiers"	Terrence O'Hara	Jordana Lewis Jaffe	January 15, 2013	412	17.63
85	13	"The Chosen One"	Paul A. Kaufman	Cheo Hodari Coker	January 29, 2013	413	17.30
86	14	"Kill House"	Larry Teng	Dave Kalstein	February 5, 2013	414	16.67
87	15	"History"	James Whitmore Jr.	Scott Sullivan	February 19, 2013	415	16.27
88	16	"Lokhay"	Diana C. Valentine	Joseph C. Wilson	February 26, 2013	416	17.02
89	17	"Wanted"	Chris O'Donnell	R. Scott Gemmill	March 5, 2013	417	16.24
90	18	"Red"	Tony Wharmby	Shane Brennan	March 19, 2013	418	16.84
91	19	"Red-2"	Tony Wharmby	Shane Brennan	March 26, 2013	419	14.53
92	20	"Purity"	Eric Laneuville	Joe Sachs	April 9, 2013	420	14.10
93	21	"Resurrection"	Eric A. Pot	Dave Kalstein & Gil Grant	April 23, 2013	421	14.22
94	22	"Raven & the Swans"	Robert Florio	R. Scott Gemmill	April 30, 2013	422	13.07
95	23	"Parley"	John Peter Kousakis	Cheo Hodari Coker	May 7, 2013	423	13.18
96	24	"Descent"	Terrence O'Hara	Frank Military	May 14, 2013	424	13.52

=== Season 5 (2013–14) ===
No. overall	No. in season	Title	Directed by	Written by	Original release date	Prod. code	U.S. viewers (millions)
97	1	"Ascension"	Terrence O'Hara	Frank Military	September 24, 2013	501	16.35
98	2	"Impact"	Jonathan Frakes	Sara Servi & R. Scott Gemmill	October 1, 2013	502	15.09
99	3	"Omni"	Larry Teng	Kyle Harimoto	October 8, 2013	503	14.84
100	4	"Reznikov, N."	Tony Wharmby	Shane Brennan	October 15, 2013	504	14.65
101	5	"Unwritten Rule"	Larry Teng	Joseph C. Wilson & Jordana Lewis Jaffe	October 22, 2013	425	14.92
102	6	"Big Brother"	Steven DePaul	Jordana Lewis Jaffe	October 29, 2013	506	14.90
103	7	"The Livelong Day"	Dennis Smith	Joe Sachs	November 5, 2013	505	14.76
104	8	"Fallout"	Diana C. Valentine	Joseph C. Wilson	November 12, 2013	507	14.88
105	9	"Recovery"	Paul A. Kaufman	Gil Grant	November 19, 2013	508	15.00
106	10	"The Frozen Lake"	John Peter Kousakis	Dave Kalstein	November 26, 2013	509	12.32
107	11	"Iron Curtain Rising"	Tony Wharmby	Jordana Lewis Jaffe	December 10, 2013	510	15.24
108	12	"Merry Evasion"	Karen Gaviola	Kyle Harimoto	December 17, 2013	511	15.58
109	13	"Allegiance"	Eric Laneuville	Frank Military & Andrew Bartels	January 14, 2014	512	15.87
110	14	"War Cries"	James Hanlon	R. Scott Gemmill	February 4, 2014	513	16.30
111	15	"Tuhon"	Christine Moore	Dave Kalstein	February 25, 2014	514	13.15
112	16	"Fish Out of Water"	Terrence O'Hara	Joe Sachs	March 4, 2014	515	14.37
113	17	"Between the Lines"	Dennis Smith	Joseph C. Wilson	March 18, 2014	516	14.21
114	18	"Zero Days"	Tony Wharmby	Andrew Bartels	March 25, 2014	517	15.54
115	19	"Spoils of War"	Frank Military	Frank Military	April 1, 2014	518	15.31
116	20	"Windfall"	Eric A. Pot	Gil Grant	April 8, 2014	519	14.56
117	21	"Three Hearts"	Diana C. Valentine	Dave Kalstein & Kyle Harimoto	April 15, 2014	520	14.69
118	22	"One More Chance"	Tony Wharmby	David J. North	April 29, 2014	521	14.83
119	23	"Exposure"	Robert Florio	Joseph C. Wilson & Jordana Lewis Jaffe	May 6, 2014	522	14.11
120	24	"Deep Trouble"	Larry Teng	R. Scott Gemmill	May 13, 2014	523	14.85

=== Season 6 (2014–15) ===
No. overall	No. in season	Title	Directed by	Written by	Original release date	Prod. code	U.S. viewers (millions)
121	1	"Deep Trouble, Part II"	Dennis Smith	R. Scott Gemmill	September 29, 2014	524	9.48
122	2	"Inelegant Heart"	John Peter Kousakis	R. Scott Gemmill	October 6, 2014	601	8.74
123	3	"Praesidium"	Dennis Smith	Erin Broadhurst & R. Scott Gemmill	October 13, 2014	602	9.24
124	4	"The 3rd Choir"	Diana C. Valentine	Dana Scanlon & R. Scott Gemmill	October 20, 2014	603	8.78
125	5	"Black Budget"	Dennis Smith	Frank Military	October 27, 2014	604	8.68
126	6	"SEAL Hunter"	Chris O'Donnell	Sara Servi & Frank Military	November 3, 2014	525	9.20
127	7	"Leipei"	David Rodriguez	Kyle Harimoto	November 10, 2014	605	8.22
128	8	"The Grey Man"	James Hanlon	Andrew Bartels	November 17, 2014	606	8.82
129	9	"Traitor"	Eric A. Pot	Michael Udesky & R. Scott Gemmill	November 24, 2014	607	8.82
130	10	"Reign Fall"	Christine Moore	Joseph C. Wilson	December 8, 2014	608	8.73
131	11	"Humbug"	Tony Wharmby	Kyle Harimoto & Andrew Bartels	December 15, 2014	609	9.54
132	12	"Spiral"	Larry Teng	Dave Kalstein	January 5, 2015	610	11.90
133	13	"In the Line of Duty"	Karen Gaviola	Tim Clemente	January 19, 2015	611	9.65
134	14	"Black Wind"	Dennis Smith	Joe Sachs	February 2, 2015	612	9.78
135	15	"Forest for the Trees"	Diana C. Valentine	Gil Grant	February 9, 2015	613	10.35
136	16	"Expiration Date"	Terence Nightingall	Dave Kalstein	February 23, 2015	614	9.83
137	17	"Savoir Faire"	Eric Laneuville	Jordana Lewis Jaffe	March 9, 2015	615	10.72
138	18	"Fighting Shadows"	Tony Wharmby	Andrew Bartels	March 23, 2015	616	9.39
139	19	"Blaze of Glory"	Terrence O'Hara	Joe Sachs	March 30, 2015	617	9.17
140	20	"Rage"	Frank Military	Frank Military	April 13, 2015	618	9.36
141	21	"Beacon"	Diana C. Valentine	Jordana Lewis Jaffe	April 20, 2015	619	8.83
142	22	"Field of Fire"	Robert Florio	Gil Grant	April 27, 2015	620	7.82
143	23	"Kolcheck, A."	James Hanlon	Joseph C. Wilson	May 11, 2015	621	8.21
144	24	"Chernoff, K."	John Peter Kousakis	Kyle Harimoto	May 18, 2015	622	9.33

=== Season 7 (2015–16) ===
No. overall	No. in season	Title	Directed by	Written by	Original release date	Prod. code	U.S. viewers (millions)
145	1	"Active Measures"	John Peter Kousakis	R. Scott Gemmill	September 21, 2015	701	7.89
146	2	"Citadel"	Eric Laneuville	Dave Kalstein	September 28, 2015	702	7.66
147	3	"Driving Miss Diaz"	James Hanlon	Andrew Bartels	October 5, 2015	703	7.99
148	4	"Command & Control"	Terrence O'Hara	Kyle Harimoto	October 12, 2015	704	8.45
149	5	"Blame It on Rio"	Dennis Smith	R. Scott Gemmill	October 19, 2015	623	8.77
150	6	"Unspoken"	Diana C. Valentine	Erin Broadhurst & Frank Military	November 2, 2015	705	8.41
151	7	"An Unlocked Mind"	Chris O'Donnell	Frank Military	November 9, 2015	624	7.91
152	8	"The Long Goodbye"	John Peter Kousakis	Dave Kalstein	November 16, 2015	708	7.91
153	9	"Defectors"	Dennis Smith	Jordana Lewis Jaffe	November 23, 2015	706	7.80
154	10	"Internal Affairs"	Eric A. Pot	Chad Mazero & R. Scott Gemmill	December 7, 2015	707	9.52
155	11	"Cancel Christmas"	Paul A. Kaufman	Joseph C. Wilson	December 14, 2015	709	9.22
156	12	"Core Values"	Karen Gaviola	Joe Sachs	January 4, 2016	710	10.51
157	13	"Angels & Daemons"	James Hanlon	Andrew Bartels	January 18, 2016	711	10.64
158	14	"Come Back"	Eric Laneuville	Erin Broadhurst	January 25, 2016	714	10.06
159	15	"Matryoshka"	Dennis Smith	Kyle Harimoto & R. Scott Gemmill	February 8, 2016	712	9.75
160	16	"Matryoshka, Part 2"	Terrence O'Hara	Kyle Harimoto & R. Scott Gemmill	February 22, 2016	713	8.82
161	17	"Revenge Deferred"	Rick Tunell	Frank Military and Chad Mazero	February 29, 2016	715	7.94
162	18	"Exchange Rate"	Tawnia McKiernan	Jordana Lewis Jaffe	March 14, 2016	716	8.78
163	19	"The Seventh Child"	Frank Military	Frank Military	March 21, 2016	717	8.76
164	20	"Seoul Man"	Diana C. Valentine	Joe Sachs	March 28, 2016	718	8.91
165	21	"Head of the Snake"	Robert Florio	Joseph C. Wilson	April 11, 2016	719	8.24
166	22	"Granger, O."	Dennis Smith	Kyle Harimoto	April 18, 2016	720	7.79
167	23	"Where There's Smoke…"	James Hanlon	Andrew Bartels	April 25, 2016	721	7.87
168	24	"Talion"	John Peter Kousakis	R. Scott Gemmill	May 2, 2016	722	8.10

=== Season 8 (2016–17) ===
No. overall	No. in season	Title	Directed by	Written by	Original release date	Prod. code	U.S. viewers (millions)
169	1	"High-Value Target"	Tawnia McKiernan	R. Scott Gemmill	September 25, 2016	802	10.34
170	2	"Belly of the Beast"	Terrence O'Hara	R. Scott Gemmill	September 25, 2016	801	10.34
171	3	"The Queen's Gambit"	Dennis Smith	R. Scott Gemmill	October 2, 2016	803	11.39
172	4	"Black Market"	James Hanlon	Jordana Lewis Jaffee	October 16, 2016	804	10.89
173	5	"Ghost Gun"	Benny Boom	Kyle Harimoto	October 23, 2016	805	11.40
174	6	"Home Is Where the Heart Is"	Eric A. Pot	Joseph C. Wilson	October 30, 2016	806	9.74
175	7	"Crazy Train"	Diana C. Valentine	Frank Military	November 6, 2016	807	10.26
176	8	"Parallel Resistors"	Eric Laneuville	Joe Sachs	November 13, 2016	808	12.11
177	9	"Glasnost"	John Peter Kousakis	Andrew Bartels	November 20, 2016	809	10.43
178	10	"Sirens"	Jonathan Frakes	Erin Broadhurst	November 27, 2016	810	11.39
179	11	"Tidings We Bring"	James Hanlon	Chad Mazero	December 18, 2016	811	10.37
180	12	"Kulinda"	Tawnia McKiernan	Kyle Harimoto	January 8, 2017	812	10.41
181	13	"Hot Water"	Dennis Smith	Anastasia Kousakis	January 15, 2017	813	8.58
182	14	"Under Siege"	Ruba Nadda	R. Scott Gemmill	January 29, 2017	814	11.29
183	15	"Payback"	Terrence O'Hara	Jordana Lewis Jaffe	February 19, 2017	815	8.61
184	16	"Old Tricks"	Terence Nightingall	Andrew Bartels	March 5, 2017	816	9.46
185	17	"Queen Pin"	Eric Laneuville	Joseph C. Wilson	March 12, 2017	817	9.26
186	18	"Getaway"	Tony Wharmby	Erin Broadhurst	March 19, 2017	818	9.10
187	19	"767"	Benny Boom	Kyle Harimoto	March 26, 2017	819	11.17
188	20	"From Havana with Love"	Dennis Smith	Joe Sachs	April 9, 2017	820	9.51
189	21	"Battle Scars"	James Whitmore Jr.	Jordana Lewis Jaffe & Andrew Bartels	April 23, 2017	821	9.44
190	22	"Golden Days"	Ruba Nadda	Joseph C. Wilson & Lee A. Carlisle	April 30, 2017	822	9.08
191	23	"Uncaged"	Frank Military	Frank Military	May 7, 2017	824	9.06
192	24	"Unleashed"	John Peter Kousakis	R. Scott Gemmill	May 14, 2017	823	9.40

=== Season 9 (2017–18) ===
- Nia Long (Shay Mosley) joined the main cast.

No. overall	No. in season	Title	Directed by	Written by	Original release date	Prod. code	U.S. viewers (millions)
193	1	"Party Crashers"	John Peter Kousakis	R. Scott Gemmill	October 1, 2017	901	8.95
194	2	"Se Murio El Payaso"	Rick Tunell	Kyle Harimoto	October 8, 2017	825	8.46
195	3	"Assets"	Tawnia McKiernan	Kyle Harimoto	October 15, 2017	902	8.65
196	4	"Plain Sight"	Dennis Smith	Joseph C. Wilson	October 22, 2017	903	8.18
197	5	"Mountebank"	Terrence O'Hara	Jordana Lewis Jaffe	October 29, 2017	904	7.50
198	6	"Can I Get a Witness?"	James Hanlon	Chad Mazero	November 5, 2017	826	8.03
199	7	"The Silo"	James Whitmore Jr.	Frank Military	November 12, 2017	905	7.86
200	8	"This Is What We Do"	John Peter Kousakis	R. Scott Gemmill	November 19, 2017	906	6.95
201	9	"Fool Me Twice"	Benny Boom	Andrew Bartels	November 26, 2017	907	7.64
202	10	"Forasteira"	Eric A. Pot	Erin Broadhurst	December 10, 2017	908	7.53
203	11	"All Is Bright"	Ruba Nadda	Chad Mazero	December 17, 2017	909	7.21
204	12	"Under Pressure"	Diana C. Valentine	Joe Sachs	January 7, 2018	911	7.87
205	13	"Các Tù Nhân"	James Hanlon	R. Scott Gemmill	January 14, 2018	910	9.12
206	14	"Goodbye, Vietnam"	John Peter Kousakis	R. Scott Gemmill	March 11, 2018	912	8.03
207	15	"Liabilities"	Lily Mariye	Kyle Harimoto	March 18, 2018	913	8.02
208	16	"Warrior of Peace"	Terence Nightingall	Andrew Bartels	March 25, 2018	914	8.58
209	17	"The Monster"	Dennis Smith	Adam George Key & Frank Military	April 1, 2018	915	7.12
210	18	"Vendetta"	James Whitmore Jr.	Jordana Lewis Jaffe	April 8, 2018	916	8.14
211	19	"Outside the Lines"	Suzanne Saltz	Joseph C. Wilson	April 22, 2018	917	7.57
212	20	"Reentry"	Eric A. Pot	Lee A. Carlisle & Andrew Bartels	April 29, 2018	918	7.62
213	21	"Where Everybody Knows Your Name"	Rick Tunell	Chad Mazero & Jordana Lewis Jaffe	May 6, 2018	919	7.71
214	22	"Venganza"	Yangzom Brauen	Erin Broadhurst & Kyle Harimoto	May 13, 2018	920	7.32
215	23	"A Line in the Sand"	Frank Military	Frank Military	May 20, 2018	921	7.82
216	24	"Ninguna Salida"	John Peter Kousakis	Joe Sachs & R. Scott Gemmill	May 20, 2018	922	7.82

=== Season 10 (2018–19) ===
- Nia Long (Shay Mosley) departed the show in episode 6, "Asesinos".
- This is the final season to have 24 episodes.

No. overall	No. in season	Title	Directed by	Written by	Original release date	Prod. code	U.S. viewers (millions)
217	1	"To Live and Die in Mexico"	Frank Military	Frank Military	September 30, 2018	1001	8.75
218	2	"Superhuman"	Dennis Smith	Kyle Harimoto	October 7, 2018	1002	7.54
219	3	"The Prince"	Lily Mariye	Andrew Bartels	October 14, 2018	1003	7.63
220	4	"Hit List"	Eric A. Pot	R. Scott Gemmill	October 21, 2018	1005	8.35
221	5	"Pro Se"	Benny Boom	Jordana Lewis Jaffe	October 28, 2018	1004	7.19
222	6	"Asesinos"	Terrence O'Hara	R. Scott Gemmill	November 4, 2018	1006	7.04
223	7	"One of Us"	Dennis Smith	Kyle Harimoto	November 11, 2018	1007	6.85
224	8	"The Patton Project"	Ruba Nadda	Frank Military	November 18, 2018	1008	7.22
225	9	"A Diamond in the Rough"	James Hanlon	Chad Mazero	November 25, 2018	1009	7.20
226	10	"Heist"	Yangzom Brauen	Jordana Lewis Jaffe	December 9, 2018	1010	7.50
227	11	"Joyride"	Tawnia McKiernan	Erin Broadhurst	December 16, 2018	1011	7.21
228	12	"The Sound of Silence"	Terence Nightingall	Joe Sachs	January 6, 2019	1012	7.59
229	13	"Better Angels"	Diana C. Valentine	Frank Military	January 13, 2019	1013	8.31
230	14	"Smokescreen"	Dennis Smith	Andrew Bartels	January 27, 2019	1014	6.75
231	15	"Smokescreen, Part II"	Sherwin Shilati	Matt Klafter & Kyle Harimoto	February 17, 2019	1015	6.74
232	16	"Into the Breach"	James Hanlon	Lee A. Carlisle	March 3, 2019	1016	6.97
233	17	"Till Death Do Us Part"	Tony Wharmby	R. Scott Gemmill	March 17, 2019	1017	8.47
234	18	"Born to Run"	Lily Mariye	Jordana Lewis Jaffe	March 24, 2019	1018	7.16
235	19	"Searching"	Terrence O'Hara	Adam George Key & Kyle Harimoto	March 31, 2019	1019	7.50
236	20	"Choke Point"	James Whitmore Jr.	Joe Sachs & R. Scott Gemmill	April 14, 2019	1020	6.79
237	21	"The One That Got Away"	Eric A. Pot	Andrew Bartels & Erin Broadhurst	April 28, 2019	1021	5.66
238	22	"No More Secrets"	Yangzom Brauen	Andrew Bartels & Erin Broadhurst	May 5, 2019	1022	4.95
239	23	"The Guardian"	John Peter Kousakis	R. Scott Gemmill	May 12, 2019	1023	5.98
240	24	"False Flag"	Dennis Smith	Frank Military	May 19, 2019	1024	5.28

=== Season 11 (2019–20) ===
- Medalion Rahimi (Fatima Namazi) had a recurring arc starting with the season premiere, "Let Fate Decide", and was later promoted to the main cast in the sixteenth episode, "Alsiyadun".

No. overall	No. in season	Title	Directed by	Written by	Original release date	Prod. code	U.S. viewers (millions)
241	1	"Let Fate Decide"	Christine Moore	Kyle Harimoto	September 29, 2019	1025	6.44
242	2	"Decoy"	Dennis Smith	Kyle Harimoto	October 6, 2019	1101	6.70
243	3	"Hail Mary"	Benny Boom	R. Scott Gemmill & Frank Military	October 13, 2019	1026	6.63
244	4	"Yellow Jack"	Terrence O'Hara	Andrew Bartels	October 20, 2019	1102	6.40
245	5	"Provenance"	Lily Mariye	Jordana Lewis Jaffe	October 27, 2019	1103	6.09
246	6	"A Bloody Brilliant Plan"	Terence Nightingall	Teleplay by : Frank Military; Story by : Terence Nightingall & Kate D. Martin & Frank Military	November 3, 2019	1104	5.71
247	7	"Concours D'Elegance"	Yangzom Brauen	Lee A. Carlisle	November 10, 2019	1105	6.04
248	8	"Human Resources"	James Hanlon	Joe Sachs	November 17, 2019	1106	6.51
249	9	"Kill Beale: Vol. 1"	Eric A. Pot	Samantha Chasse & R. Scott Gemmill	November 24, 2019	1107	6.35
250	10	"Mother"	Dennis Smith	Eric Christian Olsen & Babar Peerzada	December 1, 2019	1108	6.42
251	11	"Answers"	Frank Military	Kyle Harimoto	December 8, 2019	1109	6.42
252	12	"Groundwork"	Benny Boom	Erin Broadhurst	January 5, 2020	1110	5.72
253	13	"High Society"	John Peter Kousakis	Chad Mazero	January 12, 2020	1111	6.37
254	14	"Commitment Issues"	James Hanlon	Jordana Lewis Jaffe	February 16, 2020	1112	6.05
255	15	"The Circle"	Diana C. Valentine	Andrew Bartels	February 23, 2020	1113	6.20
256	16	"Alsiyadun"	Dennis Smith	R. Scott Gemmill	March 1, 2020	1114	6.49
257	17	"Watch Over Me"	Dan Liu	Kyle Harimoto	March 8, 2020	1115	6.56
258	18	"Missing Time"	Yangzom Brauen	Andrew Bartels	March 22, 2020	1116	7.44
259	19	"Fortune Favors the Brave"	Eric A. Pot	R. Scott Gemmill	March 29, 2020	1117	7.01
260	20	"Knock Down"	Tony Wharmby	Jordana Lewis Jaffe	April 12, 2020	1118	6.77
261	21	"Murder of Crows"	Suzanne Saltz	Chad Mazero	April 19, 2020	1120	6.89
262	22	"Code of Conduct"	Frank Military	Frank Military	April 26, 2020	1119	5.26

=== Season 12 (2020–21) ===
- Caleb Castille (Devin Roundtree) was promoted to the main cast as of this season.
- Barrett Foa (Eric Beale) and Renée Felice Smith (Nell Jones) departed the series in the season finale "A Tale of Two Igors".

No. overall	No. in season	Title	Directed by	Written by	Original release date	Prod. code	U.S. viewers (millions)
263	1	"The Bear"	Dennis Smith	R. Scott Gemmill	November 8, 2020	1203	6.35
264	2	"War Crimes"	Yangzom Brauen	Jordana Lewis Jaffe	November 15, 2020	1202	6.10
265	3	"Angry Karen"	Dennis Smith	R. Scott Gemmill	November 22, 2020	1201	6.11
266	4	"Cash Flow"	Yangzom Brauen	Kyle Harimoto	December 6, 2020	1204	4.56
267	5	"Raising the Dead"	Terrence O'Hara	Frank Military	December 6, 2020	1205	3.86
268	6	"If the Fates Allow"	Dan Liu	Andrew Bartels	December 13, 2020	1206	6.04
269	7	"Overdue"	Terrence O'Hara	Chad Mazero	January 3, 2021	1207	5.73
270	8	"Love Kills"	Dan Liu	R. Scott Gemmill	January 10, 2021	1208	5.89
271	9	"A Fait Accompli"	Eric A. Pot	Matt Klafter & Kyle Harimoto	January 17, 2021	1209	5.57
272	10	"The Frogman's Daughter"	Tawnia McKiernan	Indira Gibson Wilson & Jordana Lewis Jaffee	February 14, 2021	1210	6.15
273	11	"Russia, Russia, Russia"	Daniela Ruah	R. Scott Gemmill	February 21, 2021	1211	5.92
274	12	"Can't Take My Eyes Off You"	Tawnia McKiernan	Lee A. Carlisle	February 28, 2021	1212	5.83
275	13	"Red Rover, Red Rover"	Terrence O'Hara	Andrew Bartels	March 28, 2021	1213	5.57
276	14	"The Noble Maidens"	James Hanlon	Chad Mazero & R. Scott Gemmill	April 4, 2021	1214	5.55
277	15	"Imposter Syndrome"	Eric A. Pot	Samantha Chasse	May 2, 2021	1215	5.61
278	16	"Signs of Change"	Dennis Smith	Indira Gibson Wilson & Jordana Lewis Jaffee	May 9, 2021	1216	5.60
279	17	"Through the Looking Glass"	Frank Military	Frank Military	May 16, 2021	1217	5.85
280	18	"A Tale of Two Igors"	John Peter Kousakis	Kyle Harimoto & R. Scott Gemmill	May 23, 2021	1218	6.18

=== Season 13 (2021–22) ===
- Gerald McRaney (Hollace Kilbride) became a series regular.

No. overall	No. in season	Title	Directed by	Written by	Original release date	Prod. code	U.S. viewers (millions)
281	1	"Subject 17"	Dennis Smith	R. Scott Gemmill	October 10, 2021	1304	5.85
282	2	"Fukushu"	Dennis Smith	Kyle Harimoto	October 17, 2021	1302	5.62
283	3	"Indentured"	Eric A. Pot	Frank Military	October 24, 2021	1303	5.78
284	4	"Sorry for Your Loss"	Eric A. Pot	Chad Mazero	October 31, 2021	1301	5.07
285	5	"Divided We Fall"	Terence Nightingall	Andrew Bartels	November 7, 2021	1305	5.37
286	6	"Sundown"	Suzanne Saltz	Lee A. Carlisle	November 21, 2021	1306	5.21
287	7	"Lost Sailor Down"	Daniela Ruah	Indira Wilson	January 2, 2022	1307	5.17
288	8	"A Land of Wolves"	Tawnia McKiernan	Justin Kohlas & Adam George Key	January 9, 2022	1308	5.30
289	9	"Under the Influence"	John Peter Kousakis	Anastasia Kousakis	February 27, 2022	1309	5.53
290	10	"Where Loyalties Lie"	Tawnia McKiernan	Matt Klafter	March 6, 2022	1310	5.45
291	11	"All the Little Things"	Terrence O'Hara	R. Scott Gemmill	March 13, 2022	1311	5.34
292	12	"Murmuration"	James Hanlon	Samantha Chasse	March 20, 2022	1312	5.60
293	13	"Bonafides"	Terrence O'Hara	Kyle Harimoto	March 27, 2022	1313	5.21
294	14	"Pandora's Box"	Daniela Ruah	Chad Mazero & Lee A. Carlisle	March 27, 2022	1314	4.91
295	15	"Perception"	Benny Boom	Faythallegrea Claude	April 10, 2022	1315	5.26
296	16	"MWD"	Suzanne Saltz	R. Scott Gemmill	April 17, 2022	1316	5.64
297	17	"Genesis"	John Peter Kousakis	Andrew Bartels	April 24, 2022	1317	5.65
298	18	"Hard for the Money"	Rick Tunell	Matt Klafter & Indira Gibson Wilson	May 1, 2022	1318	5.21
299	19	"Live Free or Die Standing"	Daniela Ruah	Eric Christian Olsen	May 1, 2022	1319	5.19
300	20	"Work & Family"	Dennis Smith	R. Scott Gemmill	May 8, 2022	1320	5.18
301	21	"Down the Rabbit Hole"	Frank Military	Frank Military	May 15, 2022	1321	5.33
302	22	"Come Together"	John Peter Kousakis	Kyle Harimoto	May 22, 2022	1322	4.44

=== Season 14 (2022–23) ===
No. overall	No. in season	Title	Directed by	Written by	Original release date	Prod. code	U.S. viewers (millions)
303	1	"Game of Drones"	Kevin Berlandi	R. Scott Gemmill	October 9, 2022	1403	4.33
304	2	"Of Value"	Diana C. Valentine	Kyle Harimoto	October 16, 2022	1401	4.07
305	3	"The Body Stitchers"	Suzanne Saltz	Adam G. Key & Frank Military	October 23, 2022	1402	3.95
306	4	"Dead Stick"	Dennis Smith	Lee A. Carlisle	October 30, 2022	1404	5.03
307	5	"Flesh & Blood"	Daniela Ruah	Chad Mazero	November 6, 2022	1405	3.56
308	6	"Glory of the Sea"	Terence Nightingall	Faythallegra Claude	November 13, 2022	1406	4.03
309	7	"Survival of the Fittest"	Eric A. Pot	Andrew Bartels	November 20, 2022	1407	3.93
310	8	"Let It Burn"	Rick Tunell	Indira Gibson Wilson	November 27, 2022	1408	4.03
311	9	"Blood Bank"	Benny Boom	Samantha Chasse	January 8, 2023	1410	4.56
312	10	"A Long Time Coming"	Dennis Smith	R. Scott Gemmill	January 9, 2023	1409	6.80
313	11	"Best Seller"	James Hanlon	Kyle Harimoto	January 15, 2023	1411	4.71
314	12	"In the Name of Honor"	Dan Liu	Matt Klafter	February 19, 2023	1412	3.47
315	13	"A Farewell to Arms"	John Peter Kousakis; Eric A. Pot	Chad Mazero	February 26, 2023	1413	4.53
316	14	"Shame"	Daniela Ruah	Sam Block & Jamil Akim O'Quinn	March 5, 2023	1414	4.28
317	15	"The Other Shoe"	Eric Wilson	Lee A. Carlisle & Justin Kohlas	March 19, 2023	1415	3.95
318	16	"Sleeping Dogs"	Gonzalo Amat	Andrew Bartels	March 26, 2023	1416	4.24
319	17	"Maybe Today"	Eric A. Pot	Samantha Chasse & Matt Klafter	April 16, 2023	1417	4.30
320	18	"Sensu Lato"	Kevin Berlandi	Faythallegra Claude & Indira Gibson Wilson	April 23, 2023	1418	4.26
321	19	"The Reckoning"	Frank Military	Frank Military	May 7, 2023	1419	4.49
322	20	"New Beginnings"	John Peter Kousakis	Kyle Harimoto & R. Scott Gemmill	May 14, 2023	1420	4.15
323	21	"New Beginnings, Part Two"	John Peter Kousakis	Kyle Harimoto & R. Scott Gemmill	May 21, 2023	1421	5.24

== Ratings ==
NCIS: Los Angeles : U.S. viewers per episode (millions)

Season	Episode number																							
Season	1	2	3	4	5	6	7	8	9	10	11	12	13	14	15	16	17	18	19	20	21	22	23	24
1	18.73	17.40	16.31	15.38	16.48	15.29	16.23	14.87	17.22	17.50	18.07	15.60	16.94	16.42	17.91	14.84	17.00	15.10	13.79	15.62	14.34	16.04	15.32	13.23
2	15.76	13.60	16.51	16.14	16.05	16.00	15.99	15.61	15.81	14.96	16.82	18.13	17.29	17.70	17.16	16.80	18.69	15.67	16.56	15.34	15.46	14.16	14.74	15.61
3	16.71	16.26	14.78	15.40	15.35	15.89	15.52	15.66	15.15	14.09	16.40	17.08	16.60	16.27	16.15	15.47	15.85	16.17	14.75	12.86	15.21	14.56	15.19	15.19
4	16.74	14.91	15.18	16.53	16.28	15.77	15.13	14.49	15.12	15.48	17.90	17.63	17.30	16.67	16.27	17.02	16.24	16.84	14.53	14.10	14.22	13.07	13.18	13.52
5	16.35	15.09	14.84	14.65	14.92	14.90	14.76	14.88	14.99	12.32	15.24	15.58	15.87	16.30	13.15	14.37	14.21	15.54	15.31	14.56	14.69	14.83	14.11	14.85
6	9.48	8.74	9.24	8.78	8.68	9.20	8.22	8.82	8.82	8.73	9.54	11.90	9.65	9.78	10.35	9.83	10.72	9.39	9.17	9.36	8.83	7.82	8.21	9.33
7	7.89	7.66	7.99	8.45	8.77	8.41	7.91	7.91	7.80	9.52	9.22	10.51	10.64	10.06	9.75	8.82	7.94	8.78	8.76	8.91	8.24	7.79	7.87	8.10
8	10.34	10.34	11.39	10.89	11.40	9.74	10.26	12.11	10.43	11.39	10.37	10.41	8.58	11.29	8.61	9.46	9.26	9.10	11.17	9.51	9.44	9.08	9.06	9.40
9	8.95	8.46	8.65	8.18	7.50	8.03	7.86	6.95	7.64	7.53	7.21	7.87	9.12	8.03	8.02	8.58	7.12	8.14	7.57	7.62	7.71	7.32	7.82	7.82
10	8.75	7.54	7.63	8.35	7.19	7.04	6.85	7.22	7.20	7.50	7.21	7.59	8.31	6.75	6.74	6.97	8.47	7.16	7.50	6.79	5.66	4.95	5.98	5.28
11	6.44	6.70	6.63	6.40	6.09	5.71	6.04	6.51	6.35	6.42	6.42	5.72	6.37	6.05	6.20	6.49	6.56	7.44	7.01	6.77	6.89	5.26	–	
12	6.35	6.10	6.11	4.56	3.86	6.04	5.73	5.89	5.57	6.15	5.92	5.83	5.57	5.55	5.61	5.60	5.85	6.18	–					
13	5.85	5.62	5.78	5.07	5.37	5.21	5.17	5.30	5.53	5.45	5.34	5.60	5.21	4.91	5.26	5.64	5.65	5.21	5.19	5.18	5.33	4.44	–	
14	4.33	4.07	3.95	5.03	3.56	4.03	3.93	4.03	4.56	6.80	4.71	3.47	4.53	4.28	3.95	4.24	4.30	4.26	4.49	4.15	5.24	–		

Audience measurement performed by Nielsen Media Research

== Home media ==
Season	Episodes	DVD release dates			
Season	Episodes	Region 1	Region 2	Region 4	Discs
Intro	24	August 31, 2010	August 2, 2010	August 19, 2010	6
1	24	August 31, 2010	August 2, 2010	August 19, 2010	6
2	24	August 23, 2011	August 22, 2011	September 1, 2011	6
3	24	August 21, 2012	August 27, 2012	August 1, 2012	6
4	24	August 20, 2013	August 19, 2013	August 14, 2013	6
5	24	August 19, 2014	August 18, 2014	August 20, 2014	6
6	24	August 18, 2015	September 14, 2015	August 26, 2015	6
7	24	August 30, 2016	September 19, 2016	September 29, 2016	6
8	24	August 22, 2017	September 18, 2017	August 30, 2017	6
9	24	August 28, 2018	September 17, 2018	August 15, 2018	6
10	24	August 27, 2019	September 23, 2019	August 28, 2019	6
11	22	August 4, 2020	TBA	TBA	5
12	18	August 24, 2021	TBA	TBA	5
13	22	August 23, 2022	TBA	TBA	5
14	21	September 5, 2023	TBA	TBA	6

== See also ==
- NCIS (franchise)
- List of JAG episodes
- List of Hawaii Five-0 episodes
- List of NCIS episodes
- List of NCIS: New Orleans episodes
- List of NCIS: Hawaiʻi episodes
- List of NCIS: Sydney episodes
- List of NCIS: Origins episodes
