= NCIS: Los Angeles season 6 =

Season of television series

NCIS: Los Angeles
- Season 6
- Season 6 U.S. DVD cover
- Starring: Chris O'Donnell; Daniela Ruah; Eric Christian Olsen; Barrett Foa; Renée Felice Smith; Miguel Ferrer; Linda Hunt; LL Cool J
- No. of episodes: 24

Release
- Original network: CBS
- Original release: September 29, 2014 – May 18, 2015

Season chronology
- ← Previous; Season 5 Next → Season 7

The sixth season of NCIS: Los Angeles an American police procedural drama television series originally aired on CBS from September 29, 2014, through May 18, 2015. The season was produced by Shane Brennan Productions and CBS Television Studios, with Shane Brennan as showrunner and executive producer. This season saw the show move from Tuesday nights, where it used to follow NCIS to Monday nights.

== Cast and characters ==
=== Main ===
- Chris O'Donnell as G. Callen, NCIS Senior Special Agent (SSA) of the Office of Special Projects (O.S.P.) in Los Angeles
- Daniela Ruah as Kensi Blye, NCIS Junior Special Agent
- Eric Christian Olsen as Marty Deeks, L.A.P.D. Detective Liaison to NCIS
- Barrett Foa as Eric Beale, NCIS Technical Operator
- Renée Felice Smith as Nell Jones, NCIS Special Agent and Intelligence Analyst
- Miguel Ferrer as Owen Granger, NCIS Assistant Director
- Linda Hunt as Henrietta Lange, NCIS Supervisory Special Agent and Operations Manager
- LL Cool J as Sam Hanna, NCIS Senior Agent, Second in Command

=== Recurring ===
- Rocky Carroll as Leon Vance, NCIS Director stationed in Washington, D.C.
- Vyto Ruginis as Arkady Kolcheck
- Peter Cambor as Nate Getz, NCIS Special Agent
- Aunjanue Ellis as Michelle Hanna, "Quinn", Sam's wife
- Mercedes Mason as Talia Del Campo
- Elizabeth Bogush as Joelle Taylor
- Alicia Coppola as Lisa Rand

=== Guests ===
- Julie Chen as Ambassador Nancy Kelly
- Don Franklin as Captain Alan Beck
- Paul Tassone as CIA Agent Walter
- Jay Pickett as Navy Commander Tom Harris
- Ernie Reyes Jr. as Jemadar Thapa
- Gerald McRaney as Hollace Kilbride, Retired Navy Admiral

== Episodes ==
No. overall	No. in season	Title	Directed by	Written by	Original release date	Prod. code	U.S. viewers (millions)
121	1	"Deep Trouble, Part II"	Dennis Smith	R. Scott Gemmill	September 29, 2014	524	9.48
After events in "Deep Trouble" Hetty returns to OSP. Granger interrogates Charles Anderson for his submarine's capabilities; Eric assesses its route. Callen and Hanna disconnect batteries to slow the submarine. Jihadist captain Jabril cuts air and power to their forward hold. At Wilson's house, baited about Marty, Kensi headbuts Talia, who hits back; another agent intervenes. Kensi finds fertilizer receipts, realizing the submarine is a giant bomb. Deducing their San Diego target, the USS Van Buren aircraft carrier, Callen and Hanna cause a hull breach. Deeks cons Michael Wilson who names Jabril and Richard Miller, aka Worm, who cuts drugs. Eric informs Hetty, the Navy sent a P8A Poseidon to destroy the submarine. With Talia's DEA Agents, Marty and Kensi con Madge at her Chinese restaurant to arrest Worm, then convince Granger to board a helicopter. With water nosing the submarine downward, Jabril is forced to open the forward hatch. The flood allows Hanna and Callen to pull Ali Hanna and Yusef underwater, before Sam kills Jabril. The Poseidon locates the submarine and drops a torpedo. Callen and Hanna flood the submarine to make a free ascent. The torpedo hits, and they surface to be rescued via helicopter.
122	2	"Inelegant Heart"	John Peter Kousakis	R. Scott Gemmill	October 6, 2014	601	8.74
The team discovers one of them has been compromised during a murder investigation. Hetty is under investigation, and the DOJ investigates the team.
123	3	"Praesidium"	Dennis Smith	Erin Broadhurst & R. Scott Gemmill	October 13, 2014	602	9.24
One of Hetty's houses is attacked, resulting in the death of her bodyguard. As the DOJ investigation continues, the team is forced to balance eluding their questions with finding who was responsible. Ultimately, Vance reveals to Hetty that the investigation into OSP was a ploy to get Hetty out of Los Angeles, protecting her from a leak inside of the agency and a subsequent attempt on her life, leading the team to discover that Mattias Draeger, an old enemy (from "Absolution"), was responsible for the attempt, and the episode ends with Callen threatening to make good on the promise they made to him before vowing that they will hunt down Mattias and kill him.
124	4	"The 3rd Choir"	Diana C. Valentine	Dana Scanlon & R. Scott Gemmill	October 20, 2014	603	8.78
The team finds itself in danger as the mole remains inside of the agency. Nate returns to help Nell deal with the aftermath of her first kill while the OSP center itself turns into a battleground when Mattias arrives to abduct Hetty to take her to Moscow to trade her extensive knowledge for money.
125	5	"Black Budget"	Dennis Smith	Frank Military	October 27, 2014	604	8.68
DoD West Coast office was attacked with two dead and one missing survivor. Callen and Sam go to Mexico to find the missing DoD employee.
126	6	"SEAL Hunter"	Chris O'Donnell	Sara Servi & Frank Military	November 3, 2014	525	9.20
Sam is arrested for murdering a woman, and the rest of the team try to prove his innocence despite being stone-walled by the FBI and a U.S. Attorney. It turns out a former Marine student of Sam's was running a large scale identity theft operation, and he framed Sam in the murder of his accountant.
127	7	"Leipei"	David Rodriguez	Kyle Harimoto	November 10, 2014	605	8.22
When a Greek terrorist is killed using a drone in Los Angeles, the OSP is asked to investigate. It turns out an anarchist group had hired him to build a drone missile and then killed him using the prototype.
128	8	"The Grey Man"	James Hanlon	Andrew Bartels	November 17, 2014	606	8.82
An AWOL Marine/CIA agent is found dead, and the team goes to investigate his death, leading them to a high-profile drug lord about to be extradited to the U.S. and a major secret the deceased was holding about one of the lead attorneys on the case.
129	9	"Traitor"	Eric A. Pot	Michael Udesky & R. Scott Gemmill	November 24, 2014	607	8.82
When Granger is put in the hospital, OSP is on lockdown as everybody becomes a suspect of being the leak.
130	10	"Reign Fall"	Christine Moore	Joseph C. Wilson	December 8, 2014	608	8.73
When a paparazzo is killed outside the house of a high-ranking CIA officer and a Marine colonel, the team discovers the attack is one in a string of attacks on parents with children in military school. Meanwhile, the case has Sam to start thinking about his own father.
131	11	"Humbug"	Tony Wharmby	Kyle Harimoto & Andrew Bartels	December 15, 2014	609	9.54
When Callen's girlfriend Joelle Taylor becomes a hostage following a security company's robbery, the team's search for the robbers leads Joelle to find out his true occupation. The team discusses Christmas plans and Kensi and Deeks finally become a couple.
132	12	"Spiral"	Larry Teng	Dave Kalstein	January 5, 2015	610	11.90
Terrorists take hostages at an office building where Callen is undercover to investigate an arms dealer. Callen's team tries to extract him, only to find the building is wired with explosives.
133	13	"In the Line of Duty"	Karen Gaviola	Tim Clemente	January 19, 2015	611	9.65
After an attack on the U.S. Consulate in Tunisia, Callen and Sam go to the crime scene to investigate the death of two officers (one of which was a close friend of Sam's) and soon discover that Ambassador Nancy Kelly was not the intended target of the attackers, who have now entered the United States.
134	14	"Black Wind"	Dennis Smith	Joe Sachs	February 2, 2015	612	9.78
When the victim of a car crash is discovered to have a lethal strain of anthrax, Callen and Sam are sent to Mexico to locate the virus's origin while Kensi and Deeks try to stop the anthrax from being utilized in an attack.
135	15	"Forest for the Trees"	Diana C. Valentine	Gil Grant	February 9, 2015	613	10.35
When a tip regarding a missing NSA analyst results in Callen and Sam being abducted, Kensi and Deeks investigate whether their kidnapping was related to Granger's impending meeting with an ISIS informant.
136	16	"Expiration Date"	Terence Nightingall	Dave Kalstein	February 23, 2015	614	9.83
When on a mission to bring in an Indian defector, Sam is shot by a sniper, leading the team to work with Jemadar Thapa (from "The Frozen Lake") to find the culprit, leading to a face-off with a team of rogue Gurkha agents and questions about the defector's true agenda. Meanwhile, Kensi and Deeks have an argument.
137	17	"Savoir Faire"	Eric Laneuville	Jordana Lewis Jaffe	March 9, 2015	615	10.72
When an Afghan soldier brought to America for DEA training is murdered, the OSP team finds themselves tracking down his two comrades who have been targeted for the information they know about the Afghan military.
138	18	"Fighting Shadows"	Tony Wharmby	Andrew Bartels	March 23, 2015	616	9.39
After a successful sting operation, three FBI agents are killed in a sudden explosion, resulting in OSP being assigned to investigate. Upon investigating, they learn that the agents were killed by a hidden bomb and that the attack isn't the only one - leaving the team racing against the clock to identify where the second attack is being held. Meanwhile, for the investigation, Hetty pairs Kensi with Sam and Callen with Deeks, but for a reason neither Kensi nor Deeks can guess.
139	19	"Blaze of Glory"	Terrence O'Hara	Joe Sachs	March 30, 2015	617	9.17
After a Navy test missile is hijacked and used to destroy a civilian boat, the team is tasked with ensuring other Navy weapon systems haven't been compromised, and the team's investigation leads them to an internal conflict inside of a hackers' organization. Meanwhile, when a college graduate agent comes down to OSP to assist, Eric begins to hit it off with her, making Nell jealous.
140	20	"Rage"	Frank Military	Frank Military	April 13, 2015	618	9.36
Callen is returned to his undercover assignment in prison (as seen in "Inelegant Heart") to infiltrate a White supremacist group suspected of holding stolen nuclear material, and soon finds himself in the midst of a bank robbery with trigger-happy "brothers".
141	21	"Beacon"	Diana C. Valentine	Jordana Lewis Jaffe	April 20, 2015	619	8.83
icon
142	22	"Field of Fire"	Robert Florio	Gil Grant	April 27, 2015	620	7.82
The team searches for a former Marine and expert sniper who escaped a veterans hospital when they discover his connection to the leader of an extremist group. Also, the case reminds Kensi of her past as a sniper.
143	23	"Kolcheck, A."	James Hanlon	Joseph C. Wilson	May 11, 2015	621	8.21
Callen and Sam search for answers when they find dead crew members from the missing oil tanker used in Arkady's deal with Russia, and also discover Arkady's personal connection to the ship.
144	24	"Chernoff, K."	John Peter Kousakis	Kyle Harimoto	May 18, 2015	622	9.33
Callen, Sam and Hetty go to Russia to search for and rescue Arkady’s daughter Anna, and shut down the sale of the oil, Arkady is captured by the Russian police. Callen uncovers new information regarding his father.

== Production ==
=== Development ===
NCIS: Los Angeles was renewed for a sixth season on March 13, 2014.

== Broadcast ==
NCIS: Los Angeles premiered on September 29, 2014. NCIS: Los Angeles moved from a previous timeslot Tuesday at 9:00 pm to a Monday timeslot at 10:00 pm.

== Reception ==
NCIS: Los Angeles ranked #27 with a total of 11.72 million viewers for the 2014–15 U.S. network television season.

=== Ratings ===
Viewership and ratings per episode of NCIS: Los Angeles season 6
No.	Title	Air date	Rating/share (18–49)	Viewers (millions)	DVR (18–49)	DVR viewers (millions)	Total (18–49)	Total viewers (millions)
1	"Deep Trouble, Part II"	September 29, 2014	1.9/6	9.48	1.0	3.88	2.9	13.36
2	"Inelegant Heart"	October 6, 2014	1.7/5	8.74	0.9	3.54	2.6	12.28
3	"Praesidium"	October 13, 2014	1.6/5	9.24	—N/a	3.50	—N/a	12.74
4	"The 3rd Choir"	October 20, 2014	1.7/5	8.78	0.9	3.56	2.6	12.34
5	"Black Budget"	October 27, 2014	1.6/5	8.68	0.9	3.85	2.5	12.53
6	"SEAL Hunter"	November 3, 2014	1.5/5	9.20	1.0	4.08	2.5	13.28
7	"Leipei"	November 10, 2014	1.5/5	8.22	1.1	4.27	2.6	12.49
8	"The Grey Man"	November 17, 2014	1.7/5	8.82	1.0	4.14	2.7	12.96
9	"Traitor"	November 24, 2014	1.5/5	8.82	—N/a	2.30	—N/a	11.12
10	"Reign Fall"	December 8, 2014	1.6/5	8.73	0.9	3.93	2.5	12.66
11	"Humbug"	December 15, 2014	1.6/5	9.54	1.0	3.76	2.6	13.30
12	"Spiral"	January 5, 2015	2.0/6	11.90	1.1	3.67	3.1	15.57
13	"In the Line of Duty"	January 19, 2015	1.5/5	9.65	1.1	4.25	2.6	13.90
14	"Black Wind"	February 2, 2015	1.7/5	9.78	1.0	3.87	2.7	13.65
15	"Forest for the Trees"	February 9, 2015	1.7/5	10.35	1.0	3.65	2.7	14.00
16	"Expiration Date"	February 23, 2015	1.6/5	9.83	0.9	3.78	2.5	13.61
17	"Savoir Faire"	March 9, 2015	1.8/5	10.72	1.0	3.81	2.8	14.20
18	"Fighting Shadows"	March 23, 2015	1.6/5	9.39	1.0	3.82	2.6	13.21
19	"Blaze of Glory"	March 30, 2015	1.5/5	9.17	1.0	3.69	2.5	12.86
20	"Rage"	April 13, 2015	1.6/5	9.36	0.8	3.37	2.4	12.73
21	"Beacon"	April 20, 2015	1.4/4	8.83	1.0	3.83	2.4	12.66
22	"Field of Fire"	April 27, 2015	1.4/4	7.82	—N/a	3.25	—N/a	11.08
23	"Kolcheck, A."	May 11, 2015	1.3/4	8.21	0.9	3.68	2.2	11.89
24	"Chernoff, K."	May 18, 2015	1.4/4	9.33	0.9	3.57	2.3	12.90

== Home video release ==
NCIS: Los Angeles: The Sixth Season
Set details	Special features	
DVD release dates
Region 1	Region 2	Region 4
August 18, 2015	September 14, 2015	August 26, 2015
