= NCIS: Los Angeles season 4 =

NCIS: Los Angeles
- Season 4
- Season 4 U.S. DVD cover
- Starring: Chris O'Donnell; Daniela Ruah; Eric Christian Olsen; Barrett Foa; Renée Felice Smith; Linda Hunt; LL Cool J
- No. of episodes: 24

Release
- Original network: CBS
- Original release: September 25, 2012 – May 14, 2013

Season chronology
- ← Previous; Season 3 Next → Season 5

The fourth season of NCIS: Los Angeles an American police procedural drama television series originally aired on CBS from September 25, 2012, to May 14, 2013. The season was produced by Shane Brennan Productions and CBS Television Studios, with Shane Brennan as showrunner and executive producer. The episodes, "Red" and "Red-2" were intended to be a backdoor pilot for a purposed series titled NCIS: Red associated with the NCIS franchise. However, NCIS: Red was not picked up to series by CBS on May 15, 2013.

== Cast and characters ==
=== Main ===
- Chris O'Donnell as G. Callen, NCIS Supervisory Special Agent (SSA) of the Office of Special Projects (O.S.P.) in Los Angeles
- Daniela Ruah as Kensi Blye, NCIS Junior Field Agent
- Eric Christian Olsen as Marty Deeks, L.A.P.D. Detective and Liaison to NCIS
- Barrett Foa as Eric Beale, NCIS Technical Operator
- Renée Felice Smith as Nell Jones, NCIS Field Agent and Intelligence Analyst
- Linda Hunt as Henrietta Lange, NCIS Supervisory Special Agent (SSA) and Operations Manager
- LL Cool J as Sam Hanna, NCIS Senior Agent, Second in Command

=== Recurring ===
- Kathleen Rose Perkins as Rose Schwartz, coroner in Los Angeles
- Vyto Ruginis as Arkady Kolcheck
- Peter Cambor as Nate Getz, NCIS Special Agent
- Miguel Ferrer as Owen Granger, NCIS Assistant Director
- Erik Palladino as Vostanik Sabatino
- Aunjanue Ellis as Michelle Hanna, "Quinn", Sam's wife
- Christopher Lambert as Marcel Janvier
- Timothy V. Murphy as Isaak Sidorov
- Ravil Isyanov as Anatoli Kirkin
- Alon Abutbul as Naseem Vaziri

=== Guests ===
- Kim Raver as Paris Sumerskill, NCIS Special Agent in Charge (SAC) of the Red Team
- John Corbett as Roy Haines, NCIS Senior Agent and Second in Command
- Scott Grimes as Dave Flynn, NCIS Forensic Agent
- Gillian Alexy as Clare Keates, NCIS Special Agent
- Edwin Hodge as Kai Ashe, NCIS Tech Expert attached to the Red Team

== Episodes ==
No. overall	No. in season	Title	Directed by	Written by	Original release date	Prod. code	U.S. viewers (millions)
73	1	"Endgame"	Terrence O'Hara	Shane Brennan	September 25, 2012	401	16.74
Following Callen's public shooting of the Chameleon, the NCIS Los Angeles team is broken up as Callen is placed on suspension and Hetty resigns from her position and starts to adjust to retired life. It is later revealed that the Chameleon's death was actually staged and following a prisoner exchange involving the Chameleon and Callen as a means to switch out an incriminating flash drive regarding a CIA agent codenamed "Cherokee" who was a part of the Iranian nuclear program, Hetty returns to lead OSP once again. Cast : Erick Avari
74	2	"Recruit"	James Whitmore Jr.	R. Scott Gemmill	October 2, 2012	402	14.91
A drone strike on a bomb-making compound in Afghanistan leads to the discovery of a retired Marine's remains, leaving the NCIS team no choice but to investigate whether or not he betrayed his country. Cast : Glenn Morshower, Kate McNeil, Enuka Okuma, Felix Ryan, Jonathan Fraser, Courtney Hope, Roshawn Franklin
75	3	"The Fifth Man"	John Peter Kousakis	Dave Kalstein	October 9, 2012	403	15.18
A diner is bombed, killing four people who were testers of a new terrorist attack warning system, prompting the team to jump into action and save the fifth and final tester, an autistic teenage girl, from suffering a similar fate. Cast : Myk Watford, Abbie Cobb, Troy Winbush, David Magidoff. Casino cameos by real-life mothers of the team's actors include Ondrea J. Smith (Mother 1), Julia O'Donnell (Mother 2), Jeanne D. Olsen (Mother 3), and Catarina Korn Broder (Mother 4).
76	4	"Dead Body Politic"	Tony Wharmby	Jordana Lewis Jaffe	October 23, 2012	404	16.53
A simple hit and run turns into a murder and a conspiracy to kill several candidates running for U.S. Senate as the NCIS Los Angeles team investigate whether it is a coincidence or a politically motivated plot. Cast : Rachel Ticotin, Brian Howe, Sam Anderson, David Chisum, Robyn Cohen, Sean Marquette, Jae Suh Park, David Del Rio
77	5	"Out of the Past"	Dennis Smith	Frank Military	October 30, 2012	405	16.28
Sam receives a voice mail from an old colleague but things take a turn when Sam arrives to find that the man is dead, having hung himself. Sam refuses to believe that the death was a suicide and as such, the team go to investigate. Meanwhile, with the arrival of a ruthless arms dealer, Sam is confronted with his past.
78	6	"Rude Awakenings"	Karen Gaviola	Frank Military	November 13, 2012	406	15.77
Continuing from "Out of the Past", with the names of the sleeper agents decoded, teams of different agencies including members of the NCIS Los Angeles team storm the houses, only to discover that they are too late and all the sleeper agents are with some of nuclear bombs in their possession which leads the team into a frantic search for the missing bombs before they are sold to enemy countries. Meanwhile, the truth about Sam's wife, Michelle is finally revealed.
79	7	"Skin Deep"	Paul A. Kaufman	Gil Grant	November 20, 2012	407	15.13
The death of a civilian Naval scientist leads the team to a convoluted web of espionage and the latest technology in covert surveillance. Meanwhile, Callen bonds with a key witness after finding out their similar upbringing.
80	8	"Collateral"	Kate Woods	Cheo Hodari Coker	November 27, 2012	408	14.49
Hetty's past resurfaces during an NCIS investigation into the death of a retired CIA agent who worked with Hetty in a joint CIA-NCIS taskforce during the 80s.
81	9	"The Gold Standard"	Tony Wharmby	Joseph C. Wilson	December 11, 2012	409	15.12
A major payment in gold on a loan from China goes missing. The team investigates possible economic terrorism which could severely impact the United States economy. Meanwhile with Deeks testifying on another case, Granger partners with a hesitant Kensi.
82	10	"Free Ride"	Jonathan Frakes	Tim Clemente & R. Scott Gemmil	December 18, 2012	410	15.48
Callen, Sam, Kensi, and Deeks spend Christmas undercover on an aircraft carrier when an NCIS Special Agent Afloat is murdered. Meanwhile, Eric and Nell get festive for the holidays, Hetty takes a trip; and Deeks gets jealous when a marine lieutenant is attracted to Kensi.
83	11	"Drive"	Steven DePaul	Joe Sachs	January 8, 2013	411	17.90
A former defendant of Deeks is targeted for discovering information that could dismantle a lucrative car shipping operation with links to an Asian terrorist ring. Meanwhile, the team tackles the large-scale stolen car operation from the inside when Kensi goes undercover in an auto body shop.
84	12	"Paper Soldiers"	Terrence O'Hara	Jordana Lewis Jaffe	January 15, 2013	412	17.63
A distraught widow is suspicious of the circumstances surrounding her Marine husband's last battle and Sam and Callen help to determine if there has been a cover-up. Meanwhile, Hetty summons Operational Psychologist Nate Getz to be her "pawn" and the rest of the team sense another evaluation on the horizon. It was later determined that a member of the coroner office that NCIS worked with had been supplying bodies to a funeral home owner for use in body parts trafficking.
85	13	"The Chosen One"	Paul A. Kaufman	Cheo Hodari Coker	January 29, 2013	413	17.30
After intercepting communications between members of a terrorist cell, Callen infiltrates a Chechen terrorist group planning their next attack on the United States but things get intense when it's revealed that Callen is in fact the "Chosen One".
86	14	"Kill House"	Larry Teng	Dave Kalstein	February 5, 2013	414	16.67
The team go undercover as an elite tactical force in order to investigate an ambush tied to a cartel kingpin with terrorist connections, but the game turns deadly when one of the rival training squad team members has his neck broken during an exercise and the team also face a race against the clock when Nell fails to check with the Ops Center, leading them to believe that she might have been taken hostage.
87	15	"History"	James Whitmore Jr.	Scott Sullivan	February 19, 2013	415	16.27
The team investigates the death of a former member of a domestic terrorist group called "Gun Barrel Party", a group that was wanted for a string of bombings and domestic terrorism during the 1970s, leading them to discover a connection between a member of a current anarchist group "Red Tide" and the "Gun Barrel Party" that could lead to another bombing.
88	16	"Lokhay"	Diana C. Valentine	Joseph C. Wilson	February 26, 2013	416	17.02
Callen is concerned that Sam might be too invested after he takes on a missing persons case to help find the nephew of an Afghani elder who helped him years ago when he was wounded on a mission in Afghanistan while the boat shed becomes an unlikely battleground when the supposedly missing nephew arrives along with a terrorist on the NCIS Wanted List, a terrorist who also wants Sam dead, forcing Callen, Kensi, and Deeks into an intense gunfight before it's too late.
89	17	"Wanted"	Chris O'Donnell	R. Scott Gemmill	March 5, 2013	417	16.24
Sam fears for his family's safety when his wife is called to resume a former CIA cover after a case suggests ties to the infamous Sidorov and his stolen nukes.
90	18	"Red"	Tony Wharmby	Shane Brennan	March 19, 2013	418	16.84
Callen and Sam team up with NCIS Red Team after a Marine is killed execution-style in Moscow, Idaho. In the process, the joint investigation also uncovers a terrorist plot similar to that of September 11.
91	19	"Red-2"	Tony Wharmby	Shane Brennan	March 26, 2013	419	14.53
Red Team and OSP head to El Centro, California to stop a terrorist hitman, only to discover that the terrorist is the target of the real killer. Meanwhile, everyone suspects a possible romance between Callen and the Red Team leader, Paris Summerskill.
92	20	"Purity"	Eric Laneuville	Joe Sachs	April 9, 2013	420	14.10
When one soldier dies and another one is treated in hospital for cyanide poisoning after drinking water out of the same jug, the team investigate whether it was an isolated incident or a test for large scale water contamination.
93	21	"Resurrection"	Eric A. Pot	Dave Kalstein & Gil Grant	April 23, 2013	421	14.22
After the body of a cartel boss disappears from the morgue, the NCIS Los Angeles team are sent to retrieve the body and determine the leak inside the DEA task force that allowed it to occur.
94	22	"Raven & the Swans"	Robert Florio	R. Scott Gemmill	April 30, 2013	422	13.07
The NCIS Los Angeles team delves deep into Hetty's past when they discover that a case for a missing person is actually an undercover agent recruited into NCIS many years ago who was investigating stolen equipment used to develop nuclear weaponry.
95	23	"Parley"	John Peter Kousakis	Cheo Hodari Coker	May 7, 2013	423	13.18
Deeks goes undercover to obtain information about an infamous arms dealer looking to get back in the business, but the woman he befriends leads the operation in a dangerous direction. Meanwhile, Kensi confronts new emotions as she runs surveillance on Deeks & his female source.
96	24	"Descent"	Terrence O'Hara	Frank Military	May 14, 2013	424	13.52
An explosion brings the search for the stolen nuclear weapons up to the top of OSP's radar, prompting Hetty to shuffle the team's partnerships. Callen and Kensi are sent overseas while Sam teams up with his wife, CIA agent, Michelle. Then later, Sam and Deeks team up stateside. In the resulting case, Deeks and Kensi share a romantic kiss, leaving both of them vulnerable while an old enemy returns with a vengeance. The episode ends with Deeks being tortured by Isaak Sidorov and his men as a helpless Sam looks on.

== Production ==
=== Development ===
NCIS: Los Angeles was renewed for a fourth season on March 14, 2012. In November 2012, NCIS: Los Angeles introduced a potential spin-off titled NCIS: Red. Written and produced by Shane Brennan, the series would follow "a mobile team of agents who live and work together as they go across the country to solve crimes". The pilot episodes, titled "Red" and "Red-2", which aired on March 19 and March 26, 2013, during the fourth season of the series. On May 15, 2013, it was announced that NCIS: Red would not be picked up to series by CBS.

== Broadcast ==
Season four of NCIS: Los Angeles premiered on September 25, 2012.

== Reception ==
=== Ratings ===
Viewership and ratings per episode of NCIS: Los Angeles season 4
No.	Title	Air date	Rating/share (18–49)	Viewers (millions)	DVR (18–49)	DVR viewers (millions)	Total (18–49)	Total viewers (millions)
1	"Endgame"	September 25, 2012	3.4/9	16.74	—N/a	2.59	—N/a	19.33
2	"Recruit"	October 2, 2012	3.1/8	14.91	0.9	2.81	4.0	17.72
3	"The Fifth Man"	October 9, 2012	3.0/8	15.18	0.9	2.81	3.9	17.99
4	"Dead Body Politic"	October 23, 2012	2.8/7	16.53	0.9	2.81	3.7	19.34
5	"Out of the Past"	October 30, 2012	2.8/7	16.28	0.8	2.64	3.6	18.92
6	"Rude Awakenings"	November 13, 2012	2.8/7	15.77	—N/a	2.69	—N/a	18.46
7	"Skin Deep"	November 20, 2012	2.8/8	15.13	0.7	2.50	3.5	17.63
8	"Collateral"	November 27, 2012	2.9/7	14.49	0.7	2.59	3.6	17.08
9	"The Gold Standard"	December 11, 2012	2.6/7	15.12	0.9	2.76	3.5	17.88
10	"Free Ride"	December 18, 2012	3.0/8	15.48	0.6	2.54	3.6	18.02
11	"Drive"	January 8, 2013	3.0/8	17.90	0.9	2.73	3.9	20.63
12	"Paper Soldiers"	January 15, 2013	2.7/7	17.63	0.7	2.84	3.4	20.47
13	"The Chosen One"	January 29, 2013	3.1/8	17.30	1.0	2.93	4.1	20.23
14	"Kill House"	February 5, 2013	3.1/8	16.67	—N/a	2.60	—N/a	19.27
15	"History"	February 19, 2013	2.7/7	16.27	0.8	2.65	3.5	18.92
16	"Lokhay"	February 26, 2013	2.9/8	17.02	0.9	2.62	3.8	19.64
17	"Wanted"	March 5, 2013	2.8/7	16.24	0.8	2.67	3.6	18.91
18	"Red"	March 19, 2013	2.9/8	16.84	0.8	2.55	3.7	19.39
19	"Red-2"	March 26, 2013	2.6/7	14.53	0.9	3.08	3.5	17.61
20	"Purity"	April 9, 2013	2.7/7	14.10	0.7	2.65	3.4	16.75
21	"Resurrection"	April 23, 2013	2.7/7	14.22	0.8	3.04	3.5	17.26
22	"Raven & the Swans"	April 30, 2013	2.2/6	13.07	—N/a	2.61	—N/a	15.68
23	"Parley"	May 7, 2013	2.4/7	13.18	0.8	2.56	3.2	15.74
24	"Descent"	May 14, 2013	2.5/7	13.52	0.9	2.75	3.4	16.27

== Home video release ==
NCIS: Los Angeles: The Fourth Season
Set details	Special features	
DVD release dates
Region 1	Region 2	Region 4
August 20, 2013	August 19, 2013	August 14, 2013
