= NCIS: Los Angeles season 2 =

NCIS: Los Angeles
- Season 2
- Season 2 U.S. DVD cover
- Starring: Chris O'Donnell; Daniela Ruah; Eric Christian Olsen; Barrett Foa; Renée Felice Smith; Linda Hunt; LL Cool J
- No. of episodes: 24

Release
- Original network: CBS
- Original release: September 21, 2010 – May 17, 2011

Season chronology
- ← Previous; Season 1 Next → Season 3

The second season of NCIS: Los Angeles an American police procedural drama television series originally aired on CBS from September 21, 2010, through May 17, 2011. The season was produced by Shane Brennan Productions and CBS Television Studios, with Shane Brennan as showrunner and executive producer. The season continues to follow the stories of the members of the Office of Special Projects, an undercover division of the Naval Criminal Investigative Service (NCIS).

The season features a major cast change: Eric Christian Olsen joins the cast, reprising his role as Marty Deeks from season one. Renée Felice Smith joins the team in episode 4 in a recurring capacity, and is promoted to a starring role in the eleventh episode. Peter Cambor is no longer a series regular, and is credited as a special guest star in the 4 episodes he appears.

== Cast and characters ==
=== Main ===
- Chris O'Donnell as G. Callen, NCIS Senior Special Agent (SSA) of the Office of Special Projects (O.S.P.) in Los Angeles
- Daniela Ruah as Kensi Blye, NCIS Junior Field Agent
- Eric Christian Olsen as Marty Deeks, L.A.P.D. Detective and Liaison to NCIS
- Barrett Foa as Eric Beale, NCIS Technical Operator
- Renée Felice Smith as Nell Jones, NCIS Junior Field Agent and Intelligence Analyst
- Linda Hunt as Henrietta Lange, NCIS Supervisory Special Agent (SSA) and Operations Manager
- LL Cool J as Sam Hanna, NCIS Senior Agent, Second in Command

=== Recurring ===
- Rocky Carroll as Leon Vance, NCIS Director stationed in Washington, D.C.
- Kathleen Rose Perkins as Rose Schwartz, coroner in Los Angeles
- Ronald Auguste as Mohad "Moe" Dusa
- Vyto Ruginis as Arkady Kolcheck
- Claire Forlani as Lauren Hunter, NCIS Senior Special Agent and temporary Operations Manager
- Raymond J. Barry as Branston Cole
- Peter Cambor as Nate Getz, NCIS Special Agent

=== Guests ===
- Alicia Coppola as Lisa Rand
- Marisol Nichols as Tracy Keller
- Erik Jensen as Landon Frisbee
- Craig Robert Young as Dracul Comescu

== Episodes ==
No. overall	No. in season	Title	Directed by	Written by	Original release date	Prod. code	U.S. viewers (millions)
25	1	"Human Traffic"	James Whitmore Jr.	Shane Brennan	September 21, 2010	201	15.76
The NCIS team's LAPD liaison officer, Detective Marty Deeks, goes missing while undercover, right after the subject of his investigation is killed by a bomb planted in their car. LAPD Detective Jess Traynor, Deeks's partner, dies from a similar car bomb just after briefing NCIS. The team is tasked to find the missing detective. Cast : Michael Harney, Meta Golding
26	2	"Black Widow"	Kate Woods	Dave Kalstein	September 21, 2010	202	13.60
An NCIS undercover agent is assassinated while in Cyprus investigating illegal arms sales to Chechen extremists. The same hit team is later detected arriving in Los Angeles, and the NCIS Los Angeles team is in a race against the clock to stop the assassins from killing their next target, a suburban housewife who is more than she appears to be. Cast : Daniel Hugh Kelly, Liane Balaban, Steven Brand, Waleed Zuaiter, Hrach Titizian
27	3	"Borderline"	Terrence O'Hara	R. Scott Gemmill	September 28, 2010	203	16.51
Four Marines are ambushed while participating in a joint DEA-Marine task force interdicting Mexican criminals along the U.S.-Mexico border. The NCIS team works to recover the captured marines and uncover the mastermind behind the operation: a textile manufacturer who wants the US military to go to war with the cartels so they will stop interfering in his factories south of the border. Cast : Alan Ruck, Billy Magnussen, Vincent Laresca, Bruno Gunn
28	4	"Special Delivery"	Tony Wharmby	Gil Grant	October 5, 2010	204	16.14
The NCIS team investigates the murder of a sailor with top-level security clearance after he is found dead and missing a hand in a Rodeo Drive parking lot. The case takes a turn after it is discovered he was selling artifacts that were looted from a museum during his tour in Iraq. Cast : Navid Negahban, Matt Cohen, Austin Stowell, Camryn Grimes
29	5	"Little Angels"	Steven DePaul	Frank Military	October 12, 2010	205	16.05
When the teenage daughter of a Navy commander is kidnapped by what appears to be a serial killer who buries his victims alive, the team needs to determine whether he is the target of blackmail for military secrets or if the crime is random. Sam takes the case personally after getting flashbacks of being buried alive while doing a mission in Bosnia as a Navy SEAL. Cast : Alicia Coppola, Brian McNamara, Vincent Irizarry, Louis Mandylor, Elaine Hendrix, Haley Ramm, Tyler Neitzel
30	6	"Standoff"	Dennis Smith	Joseph C. Wilson	October 19, 2010	206	16.00
After a downtown Navy Recruitment Center is held hostage by Callen's ex-CIA partner and undercover wife, Tracy Keller, he realises she is searching for him for help. Tracy explains she is on the verge of exposing a group of corrupt FBI Agents and their arms dealer contact in the aim of recovering stolen missiles. But not everything is as it seems, and the NCIS team worry whether Callen has fallen under the charms of his ex-wife. Cast : Marisol Nichols as Tracy Keller, and Parry Shen
31	7	"Anonymous"	Norberto Barba	Christina M. Kim	October 26, 2010	207	16.00
A State Department employee and plastic surgeon are murdered. The team discovers a terrorist cell has had their faces surgically altered. They must find the one person who can identify them and foil an impending terrorist attack. Cast : Kate Levering, Christopher Judge, Carlos Lacámara, Greg Collins, Lynn Chen, Cassandra Jean
32	8	"Bounty"	Félix Alcalá	Dave Kalstein	November 9, 2010	208	15.61
The team investigates the murder of a retired Delta Force operator who previously worked with a Marine SOCOM unit tasked to capture high-priority targets in Afghanistan. Cast : Dariush Kashani, Stephen Amell, Mary Pat Gleason
33	9	"Absolution"	Steven DePaul	R. Scott Gemmill	November 16, 2010	209	15.81
The murder of an arms dealer has Hetty and the NCIS team searching for his missing book of top-secret information. The episode ends with Hetty discovering that her "husband", Branston Cole, a security guard, and a nurse have all been killed. Cast : Jürgen Prochnow, Mark Pinter
34	10	"Deliverance"	Tony Wharmby	Frank Military & Shane Brennan	November 23, 2010	210	14.96
In the aftermath of Cole's death, Hetty and the NCIS team continue to search for a book that was the target of various intelligence agencies, both foreign and domestic. Things heat up when various spies and agencies from numerous countries begin heading to Los Angeles, forcing the team to race against time to stop the respective gangs from tearing LA apart in their search for the book. The conclusion of a two-part episode. Cast : Jürgen Prochnow, Chris McKenna, Nico Evers-Swindell, Samantha Quan, Matt Jones
35	11	"Disorder"	Jonathan Frakes	Teleplay by : Gil Grant & Dave Kalstein; Story by : Dave Kalstein	December 14, 2010	211	16.82
When two men are killed in a shootout, the NCIS team must rely on a former Navy intelligence officer suffering from PTSD to help them solve the case. Cast : David Hoflin, Azita Ghanizada, Thomas Hobson, Beth Behrs
36	12	"Overwatch"	Karen Gaviola	Lindsay Jewett Sturman	January 11, 2011	212	18.13
The NCIS team uncovers an experimental Navy tracking system when a body containing a top-secret residue is stolen from an autopsy room. It is discovered that the thieves merely needed the eyes of the victim in order to access a locked hospital storage room in order to steal radioactive material. Meanwhile, Callen challenges Hetty on the rock wall. Cast : Ned Vaughn, Aaron Abrams
37	13	"Archangel"	Tony Wharmby	R. Scott Gemmill & Shane Brennan	January 18, 2011	213	17.29
The NCIS team sets out to find the individual responsible for stealing a classified Pentagon document before the file's decryption code is cracked by the wrong party. Cast : Erik Jensen, Cliff Simon, Bre Blair, Leslie Odom Jr., Falk Hentschel
38	14	"Lockup"	Jan Eliasberg	Christina M. Kim & Frank Military	February 1, 2011	214	17.70
As G goes off the grid for a day for personal reasons, Sam goes undercover in prison in an attempt to infiltrate a Yemen-based terrorist group by getting close to its leader, another inmate. Cast : Hakeem Kae-Kazim, Rick Ravanello, Jason Matthew Smith
39	15	"Tin Soldiers"	Terrence O'Hara	R. Scott Gemmill	February 8, 2011	215	17.16
What begins as a break-in at G's house leads to a pursuit of black market microchips, and a series of double-crosses. Callen agrees to investigate an Indian "slum dog millionaire" who happens to be Arkady Kolcheck's business rival. Kolcheck also promises Callen to shed some light on the cemetery incident (season 1 finale "Callen, G"). Cast : Pej Vahdat, Nickolai Stoilov
40	16	"Empty Quiver"	James Whitmore Jr.	Dave Kalstein	February 15, 2011	216	16.80
Callen and Sam go undercover with the California Highway Patrol to investigate a corrupt group of CHiPs officers and their connection to missing weapons. But a routine job takes a dramatic turn, and a stolen nuclear warhead sends the OSP team scrambling to recover the bomb. Cast : Sophina Brown, Ed Quinn, Connor Trinneer, Mitch Longley, Lewis Tan
41	17	"Personal"	Kate Woods	Joseph C. Wilson	February 22, 2011	217	18.69
LAPD–NCIS Liaison Detective Marty Deeks's routine is thrown when he interrupts a convenience-store robbery and is shot, but the NCIS team finds out Deeks was targeted, but not to kill him, instead to lure out NCIS Junior Special Agent Kensi Blye by Vakar (first mentioned in "Black Widow"). Cast : Brad Beyer, Vasili Bogazianos, Sarayu Rao, Rafael Petardi
42	18	"Harm's Way"	Tony Wharmby	Shane Brennan	March 1, 2011	218	15.67
The story arc that started in the episode "Lockup" is concluded as Sam is sent on an undercover mission to Yemen. But the stakes are raised when it's revealed that the terrorist group has taken a young seven-year-old boy hostage and things get even worse for the team when it's discovered Nate's cover has been compromised which means that Sam has been exposed as well, forcing Callen, Sam and Nate into a fight for survival against terrorists who want them dead. Cast : Hakeem Kae-Kazim
43	19	"Enemy Within"	Steven DePaul	Lindsay Jewett Sturman	March 22, 2011	219	16.56
It's a race against time as the team attempts to foil an assassination plot against a Venezuelan politician on U.S. soil. Cast : Myndy Crist, Taylor Sheridan, Eduardo Yáñez
44	20	"The Job"	Terrence O'Hara	Frank Military & Christina M. Kim	March 29, 2011	220	15.34
A Pendleton depot Marine guard shoots Bobby Asher, while a second robber escapes. Asher identifies his accomplice – world-class jewelry-art thief, Stanley King. Undercover as a cat burglar, Kensi breaks into King's mansion to loot cash. When caught, she claims she is Lisa Roberts, Asher's partner, who owes her. Satisfied with Lisa's story, King kills Asher before Kensi can react. Deeks wants to arrest King immediately for murder, but for national security, Hetty needs to know exactly what King was trying to steal. OSP surveils King meeting with British national Patricia Dunn, who they detain, learning King leveraged her to commit auction house fraud. Eric learns Chinese dignitary Li Tan was deported for espionage after seeking stealth bomber intelligence, and his belongings were stored for forensic analysis. Nell discovers that King murdered all his former accomplices, and will likely kill Lisa as well, but Kensi insists she will not be caught off-guard again. Michael Connor and Kevin Morris bring Patricia to King, where King kills all three in a fiery explosion, saving Lisa to finish his depot heist. OSP waits for King to acquire the jade dragon in which the bomber plans are hidden before they confront and arrest him. Cast : Victor Webster as Stanley King, Amy Sloan as Patricia Dunn, Kyle Davis as Bobby Asher
45	21	"Rocket Man"	Dennis Smith	Roger Director	April 12, 2011	221	15.46
After a rocket engine expert is killed, OSP tech operator Eric Beale goes undercover for the first time to ensure that the classified technology used to build satellites is safe. Cast : Harry Van Gorkum, Wynn Everett, Gideon Emery, Danny Jacobs
46	22	"Plan B"	James Whitmore Jr.	Dave Kalstein & Joseph C. Wilson	May 3, 2011	222	14.16
To protect his best friend and primary informant from a group of arms traffickers, Deeks must go deep undercover to an old alias. Cast : Channon Roe, Evan Parke, Erin Foster, Joe Egender, Mo Gallini
47	23	"Imposters"	John Peter Kousakis	R. Scott Gemmill	May 10, 2011	223	14.74
After events in "Overwatch" a stolen canister resurfaces when OSP investigates a Navy SEAL imposter who is set ablaze. Hetty sets her affairs in order as she prepares to resign from NCIS. Cast : Blake Gibbons, Kristen Hager, Jake Richardson, Charlene Amoia, Collins Pennie
48	24	"Familia"	James Whitmore Jr.	Shane Brennan	May 17, 2011	224	15.61
Hetty's resignation from NCIS prompts Callen and the team to initiate an investigation to find her. It is revealed that she has been working on a case involving Callen's mysterious past, and that she herself is a member of the family that has been trying to kill him for years. Cast : Cristine Rose, Robin Atkin Downes, Adam Tsekhman, Jilon VanOver

== Production ==
=== Development ===
NCIS: Los Angeles was renewed for a second season on January 14, 2010.

== Broadcast ==
Season two of NCIS: Los Angeles premiered on September 21, 2010.

== Reception ==
NCIS: Los Angeles ranked #7 with a total of 16.54 million viewers for the 2010–11 U.S. network television season.

=== Ratings ===
Viewership and ratings per episode of NCIS: Los Angeles season 2
No.	Title	Air date	Rating/share (18–49)	Viewers (millions)	DVR (18–49)	DVR viewers (millions)	Total (18–49)	Total viewers (millions)
1	"Human Traffic"	September 21, 2010	3.4/9	15.76	0.7	1.94	4.1	17.70
2	"Black Widow"	September 21, 2010	3.0/9	13.60	—N/a	—N/a	—N/a	—N/a
3	"Borderline"	September 28, 2010	3.7/10	16.51	0.7	1.90	4.4	18.41
4	"Special Delivery"	October 5, 2010	3.4/9	16.14	0.8	2.02	4.2	18.16
5	"Little Angels"	October 12, 2010	3.5/9	16.05	0.7	1.89	4.2	17.94
6	"Standoff"	October 19, 2010	3.9/10	16.00	0.6	1.97	4.5	17.97
7	"Anonymous"	October 26, 2010	3.4/9	15.99	0.7	1.97	4.1	17.96
8	"Bounty"	November 9, 2010	3.3/9	15.61	0.7	2.13	4.0	17.74
9	"Absolution"	November 16, 2010	3.3/9	15.81	0.7	2.13	4.0	17.94
10	"Deliverance"	November 23, 2010	3.2/9	14.96	0.7	2.21	3.9	17.17
11	"Disorder"	December 14, 2010	3.3/9	16.82	0.7	2.14	4.0	18.96
12	"Overwatch"	January 11, 2011	3.7/10	18.13	0.8	2.21	4.5	20.34
13	"Archangel"	January 18, 2011	3.3/9	17.29	0.8	2.09	4.1	19.38
14	"Lockup"	February 1, 2011	3.8/9	17.70	0.6	1.94	4.4	19.64
15	"Tin Soldiers"	February 8, 2011	3.5/9	17.16	0.8	2.13	4.3	19.29
16	"Empty Quiver"	February 15, 2011	3.3/9	16.80	0.8	2.28	4.1	19.08
17	"Personal"	February 22, 2011	3.9/11	18.69	0.8	2.03	4.7	20.72
18	"Harm's Way"	March 1, 2011	3.2/9	15.67	0.7	2.15	3.9	17.82
19	"Enemy Within"	March 22, 2011	3.2/9	16.56	0.9	2.37	4.1	18.93
20	"The Job"	March 29, 2011	3.5/9	15.34	0.7	2.29	4.2	17.63
21	"Rocket Man"	April 12, 2011	3.3/9	15.46	0.9	2.47	4.2	17.93
22	"Plan B"	May 3, 2011	2.9/7	14.16	0.9	2.55	3.8	16.71
23	"Imposters"	May 10, 2011	2.8/7	14.74	0.8	2.37	3.6	17.11
24	"Familia"	May 17, 2011	3.3/8	15.61	1.0	2.89	4.3	18.50

== Home video release ==
NCIS: Los Angeles: The Second Season
Set details	Special features	
	Absolution – The Table Read; Shooting Up L.A.: The Cinematography of NCIS: Los Angeles; Location, Location, Location; Uncovering Season 2; There's Something About Hetty; Commentary by Eric Christian Olsen and Daniela Ruah on "Anonymous"	
DVD release dates
Region 1	Region 2	Region 4
August 23, 2011	August 22, 2011	September 1, 2011
