= NCIS: Los Angeles season 7 =

NCIS: Los Angeles
- Season 7
- Season 7 U.S. DVD cover
- Starring: Chris O'Donnell; Daniela Ruah; Eric Christian Olsen; Barrett Foa; Renée Felice Smith; Miguel Ferrer; Linda Hunt; LL Cool J
- No. of episodes: 24

Release
- Original network: CBS
- Original release: September 21, 2015 – May 2, 2016

Season chronology
- ← Previous; Season 6 Next → Season 8

The seventh season of the police procedural drama NCIS: Los Angeles premiered on September 21, 2015 on CBS, and ended on May 2, 2016. It featured 24 episodes.

== Cast and characters ==
=== Main ===
- Chris O'Donnell as Grisha "G." Callen, NCIS Senior Special Agent (SSA) of the Office of Special Projects (O.S.P.) in Los Angeles
- Daniela Ruah as Kensi Blye, NCIS Junior Special Agent
- Eric Christian Olsen as Marty Deeks, L.A.P.D. Detective and Liaison to NCIS
- Barrett Foa as Eric Beale, NCIS Technical Operator
- Renée Felice Smith as Nell Jones, NCIS Special Agent and Intelligence Analyst
- Miguel Ferrer as Owen Granger, NCIS Assistant Director
- Linda Hunt as Henrietta Lange, NCIS Supervisory Special Agent and Operations Manager
- LL Cool J as Sam Hanna, NCIS Senior Special Agent, Second in Command

=== Recurring ===
- Vyto Ruginis as Arkady Kolcheck
- Peter Cambor as Nate Getz, NCIS Special Agent
- Ella Thomas as Jada Khaled
- Erik Palladino as Vostanik Sabatino
- Mercedes Mason as Talia Del Campo
- Elizabeth Bogush as Joelle Taylor
- Ravil Isyanov as Anatoli Kirkin
- Douglas Weston as Alex Elmslie
- Anslem Richardson as Tahir Khaled
- Pamela Reed as Roberta Deeks
- Bar Paly as Anna Kolcheck

=== Special Guest Star ===
- Michael Weatherly as Anthony "Tony" DiNozzo, NCIS Special Agent in D.C., Second in Command

=== Guest cast ===
- Shannon Cochran as Dr. Susan Rathburn
- Erin Krakow as Emily Moore
- Taylor Nichols as Chad Brunson
- Bobby Lee as Rio Syamsundin
- Cassius Willis as Russell Wallace
- Danielle Bisutti as Sarah Taylor
- Anthony Ruivivar as Agent Mark Ruiz
- Nicole Steinwedell as Allison Nelson
- Patrick St. Esprit as Roger Bates
- Nick Chinlund as Bruce Steadman
- Paulina Olszynski as Tiffany Williams
- Daniel J. Travanti as Nikita Aleksandr Reznikov / Garrison, Callen's father
- Karina Logue as LAPD Detective Ellen Whiting
- Matthew Del Negro as Jack Simon
- Malese Jow as Jennifer Kim

== Episodes ==
No. overall	No. in season	Title	Directed by	Written by	Original release date	Prod. code	U.S. viewers (millions)
145	1	"Active Measures"	John Peter Kousakis	R. Scott Gemmill	September 21, 2015	701	7.89
After leaving Arkady Kolchek in Moscow, Callen seeks help from within and outside the US government. This includes Russian mobster Anatoli Kirken, who has other plans for Callen's talents. It's up to OSP to track down Callen and bring him in before the mission costs him more than his job.
146	2	"Citadel"	Eric Laneuville	Dave Kalstein	September 28, 2015	702	7.66
After her partner leaks classified undercover assignments, DEA agent Talia De Campo teams up with NCIS to take down a government software company focused on mental algorithms.
147	3	"Driving Miss Diaz"	James Hanlon	Andrew Bartels	October 5, 2015	703	7.99
In search of evidence against a leading presidential candidate in Peru, NCIS teams up with International Criminal Tribunal agent Alex Elmslie. Little do they know, their target is much more things appear to be. Can the team protect their targets or will history go up in flames?
148	4	"Command & Control"	Terrence O'Hara	Kyle Harimoto	October 12, 2015	704	8.45
Callen and Sam are forced to work on their day off when they mysteriously receive a cell phone and the caller threatens the lives of innocent people if they don't do exactly what he says but eventually they discover it is a revenge scheme/plot connected to a case that NCIS dealt with 19 months earlier.
149	5	"Blame It on Rio"	Dennis Smith	R. Scott Gemmill	October 19, 2015	623	8.77
NCIS: D.C. Special Agent Anthony DiNozzo partners with OSP to track down an escaped fugitive and transport him to Washington for funding terrorism in the South Pacific. Meanwhile, tensions brew as DiNozzo and Kensi enter a flirtation, causing Deeks to be jealous.
150	6	"Unspoken"	Diana C. Valentine	Erin Broadhurst & Frank Military	November 2, 2015	705	8.41
After a failed arms deal results in the deaths of 3 ATF agents, Sam and the rest of the team must work to find the only survivor, Sam's former partner, and uncover the mystery behind the explosion. At OPS, Hetti and Callen express concern over whether or not they can trust Sam's judgement.
151	7	"An Unlocked Mind"	Chris O'Donnell	Frank Military	November 9, 2015	624	7.91
When a former Department of Defense analyst is admitted to a cult, Kensi and Deeks go undercover to ensure that his intel on national security and weapons haven't been passed onto a foreign adversary. Meanwhile, Hetti and Granger brace themselves as an attorney from the DOJ makes his presence known.
152	8	"The Long Goodbye"	John Peter Kousakis	Dave Kalstein	November 16, 2015	708	7.91
After her US Marshall convoy is attacked, Jadah Kaled is on the run, putting OSP on high alert. Deeks and Callen investigate and lead the search for Jadah. Kenzi travels to Mexico to join DEA agent Talia Del Campo investigating a Cartel's involvement. Meanwhile, Granger places Sam on a mission of interrogation of a captured cartel member. Granger worries that Sam's involvement with Jadah four years earlier could cloud his judgement.
153	9	"Defectors"	Dennis Smith	Jordana Lewis Jaffe	November 23, 2015	706	7.80
A random note left in a taxi sends the team on the trail of a terrorist recruiter, and they end up searching for a teenage girl who may have been recruited by a terrorist organization.
154	10	"Internal Affairs"	Eric A. Pot	Chad Mazero & R. Scott Gemmill	December 7, 2015	707	9.52
Deeks is arrested for allegedly having murdered his LAPD partner some time in his past. As the Internal Affairs detective threatens to endanger his life if he doesn't confess, the team search for a way to clear his name and find what the LAPD is really after, and whilst Kensi becomes more and more desperate to save him one question continues to be avoided: did he really do it?
155	11	"Cancel Christmas"	Paul A. Kaufman	Joseph C. Wilson	December 14, 2015	709	9.22
After the victim is revealed to be a suspected North Korean agent, the team has to find out how many North Korean agents are currently in the country. Meanwhile, Granger is bitter about the upcoming holidays, and Deeks must deal with the fallout of his recent arrest.
156	12	"Core Values"	Karen Gaviola	Joe Sachs	January 4, 2016	710	10.51
When a Marine is discovered to have radiation poisoning, the team investigates a decommissioned nuclear plant he was moonlighting as a security guard at, discovering that the plant's supposed safety protocols have been compromised.
157	13	"Angels & Daemons"	James Hanlon	Andrew Bartels	January 18, 2016	711	10.64
After a Navy computer programmer-turned-billionaire is killed, the team's investigation into his death leads them to discover a covert data-retrieving program he developed has been stolen and placed into a popular app, forcing the team to race against time to prevent the program from going online.
158	14	"Come Back"	Eric Laneuville	Erin Broadhurst	January 25, 2016	714	10.06
Just after announcing that they are moving in together, Kensi and Deeks are assigned to protect Jack Simon, Kensi's former fiancee, after an attempt is made on his life, while Callen and Sam investigate what Jack was up to recently in Afghanistan.
159	15	"Matryoshka"	Dennis Smith	Kyle Harimoto & R. Scott Gemmill	February 8, 2016	712	9.75
An assailant stuns a bodyguard, abducting Anatoli Kirkin from Hans' massage session. Callen confronts Kirkin's bodyguard at Chef Marilyn's, in vain. Hans informs, the abductor was a woman. From surveillance video, Eric tracks her van to a Long Beach shipping container, where OSP frees Kirkin and appends the woman, Anna Kolcheck, who reveals, someone wanted Kirkin in St. Petersburg, in return for her father Arkady's prison location somewhere in Russia. Hetty encourages Anna, "we have similar goals," but acting alone without a team is "no way to live a life." Anna receives Arkady's proof-of-life video, along with "comrade" cellmate Balinski. Kirkin advises, they must access the Russian prison system FSIN, which can only be done through the Russian Consul General's estate in Palos Verdes. The OSP and Anna go undercover at his charity gala. Deeks and Kensi, as Anton's catering crew, help Anna, Callen and Hanna infiltrate past doorman Semyon, provided with Nell's and Eric's backstopped cover stories. Sam brushes off Sarah's advances. Anna and Callen kiss passionately, distracting the security guards, while Sam downloads the location; Nazarovo Prison. Hetty authorizes rescuing Balinski, an alias for CIA Officer Randall Sharov. To be continued...
160	16	"Matryoshka, Part 2"	Terrence O'Hara	Kyle Harimoto & R. Scott Gemmill	February 22, 2016	713	8.82
Anna lures Nazarovo Prison guard Vlad Lukov so Callen and Hanna can pressure him for Arkady's exact cell block. CIA Analyst Robert Lester advises, "be gone in a day." With less than 6% chance of success to extract prisoners themselves without being wounded, killed or captured, Callen contacts Pavel Volkoff, who has Arkady and Sharov moved in return for jailing credit card fraudster Artem Fedor. Granger tasks Deeks and Kensi to take Beale, who has been training for field operations. During a firefight, Eric incapacitates Fedor with a flashbang. Anna, disguised as a peasant farmer, halts the prison guard driver with a cow, so OSP can grab Arkady and Sharov, who gets wounded, preventing an airport exfiltration. Sharov reveals he once guided Callen to a Sevastopol safe house while Sharov was stationed in Moscow. Needing a contingency plan, Sharov directs them to Garrison's safe house, from which they ride on horseback to Navy Seal Commander Dave's team. Garrison vows to tell Callen "everything" at "another time...You are a good man. Do svidaniya...Grisha Aleksandrovich Nikolaev." Garrison reveals, Callen's mother wanted him to know where he came from.
161	17	"Revenge Deferred"	Rick Tunell	Frank Military and Chad Mazero	February 29, 2016	715	7.94
Callen and Sam are called to Africa when pictures of Sam and his family are found in a Lord's Resistance Army outpost, and from there, the two go in search of Tahir Khaled as well as Jada. Back in Los Angeles, Kensi and Deeks try to track down information about the LRA leader, but they don't have good inter-agency cooperation when another leak is found inside the office.
162	18	"Exchange Rate"	Tawnia McKiernan	Jordana Lewis Jaffe	March 14, 2016	716	8.78
After a Cuban spy about to be involved in a prisoner exchange escapes custody, the team discovers that Anna was involved with the escape, and the situation gets crazier when inconsistencies in his trial are discovered.
163	19	"The Seventh Child"	Frank Military	Frank Military	March 21, 2016	717	8.76
After a child is killed by a bomb strapped to his chest, the team soon chases after his twin brother, also with a bomb strapped to his chest and ready to blow.
164	20	"Seoul Man"	Diana C. Valentine	Joe Sachs	March 28, 2016	718	8.91
While on protection detail for a conference attended by the heads of multiple Navies, the OSP team finds themselves searching for a possible North Korean mole hidden in the delegation. Cast: Andrew L. Traver, actual Director of NCIS (2013–19), appears in cameo as Agent Gates on the firing range with Granger.
165	21	"Head of the Snake"	Robert Florio	Joseph C. Wilson	April 11, 2016	719	8.24
Following the theft of weapons en route to be disposed of, the team becomes concerned that Nate has turned on them, and must figure out his true game before it's too late.
166	22	"Granger, O."	Dennis Smith	Kyle Harimoto	April 18, 2016	720	7.79
While Callen and the team investigate the death of a North Korean spy, Granger talks with Jennifer Kim, who happens to be his illegitimate daughter.
167	23	"Where There's Smoke…"	James Hanlon	Andrew Bartels	April 25, 2016	721	7.87
When investigating the death of a firefighter in a Navy Sensitive Compartmented Information Facility (SCIF), the team discovers that someone had stolen hard drives from the SCIF, sending Callen and Sam undercover as firefighters to find who is responsible, and what was stolen.
168	24	"Talion"	John Peter Kousakis	R. Scott Gemmill	May 2, 2016	722	8.10
Sam's son Aiden's military school is attacked by Tahir Khaled, so the team rushes to San Francisco to bring Khaled down, before other agencies get involved and complicate matters.

== Production ==
On May 11, 2015, CBS renewed the series for a seventh season. Originally, the episode "Defectors" was supposed to air on November 16, but the plot was too similar to the 2015 Paris attacks.

== Ratings ==
Viewership and ratings per episode of NCIS: Los Angeles season 7
No.	Title	Air date	Rating/share (18–49)	Viewers (millions)
1	"Active Measures"	September 21, 2015	1.2/4	7.89
2	"Citadel"	September 28, 2015	1.2/4	7.66
3	"Driving Miss Diaz"	October 5, 2015	1.2/4	7.99
4	"Command & Control"	October 12, 2015	1.1/3	8.45
5	"Blame It on Rio"	October 19, 2015	1.3/4	8.77
6	"Unspoken"	November 2, 2015	1.3/4	8.41
7	"An Unlocked Mind"	November 9, 2015	1.3/4	7.91
8	"The Long Goodbye"	November 16, 2015	1.3/4	7.91
9	"Defectors"	November 23, 2015	1.2/4	7.80
10	"Internal Affairs"	December 7, 2015	1.4/4	9.52
11	"Cancel Christmas"	December 14, 2015	1.4/5	9.22
12	"Core Values"	January 4, 2016	1.6/5	10.51
13	"Angels & Daemons"	January 18, 2016	1.6/5	10.64
14	"Come Back"	January 25, 2016	1.5/5	10.06
15	"Matryoshka"	February 8, 2016	1.6/5	9.75
16	"Matryoshka, Part 2"	February 22, 2016	1.3/4	8.82
17	"Revenge Deferred"	February 29, 2016	1.2/4	7.94
18	"Exchange Rate"	March 14, 2016	1.3/4	8.78
19	"The Seventh Child"	March 21, 2016	1.3/4	8.76
20	"Seoul Man"	March 28, 2016	1.2/4	8.91
21	"Head of the Snake"	April 11, 2016	1.3/4	8.24
22	"Granger, O."	April 18, 2016	1.2/4	7.79
23	"Where There's Smoke…"	April 25, 2016	1.2/4	7.87
24	"Talion"	May 2, 2016	1.3/4	8.10

== Home video release ==
NCIS: Los Angeles: The Seventh Season
Set details	Special features	
DVD release dates
Region 1	Region 2	Region 4
August 30, 2016	September 19, 2016	September 29, 2016
