= NCIS: Los Angeles season 5 =

NCIS: Los Angeles
- Season 5
- Season 5 U.S. DVD cover
- Starring: Chris O'Donnell; Daniela Ruah; Eric Christian Olsen; Barrett Foa; Renée Felice Smith; Miguel Ferrer; Linda Hunt; LL Cool J
- No. of episodes: 24

Release
- Original network: CBS
- Original release: September 24, 2013 – May 13, 2014

Season chronology
- ← Previous; Season 4 Next → Season 6

The fifth season of NCIS: Los Angeles, an American police procedural drama television series, originally aired on CBS from September 24, 2013, to May 13, 2014. The season was produced by Shane Brennan Productions and CBS Television Studios, with Shane Brennan as showrunner and executive producer. The season also includes the series' 100th episode.

== Cast and characters ==
=== Main ===
- Chris O'Donnell as G. Callen, NCIS Senior Special Agent (SSA) of the Office of Special Projects (O.S.P.) in Los Angeles
- Daniela Ruah as Kensi Blye, NCIS Junior Special Agent
- Eric Christian Olsen as Marty Deeks, LAPD Detective and Liaison to NCIS
- Barrett Foa as Eric Beale, NCIS Technical Operator
- Renée Felice Smith as Nell Jones, NCIS Special Agent and Intelligence Analyst
- Miguel Ferrer as Owen Granger, NCIS Assistant Director
- Linda Hunt as Henrietta Lange, NCIS Supervisory Special Agent (SSA) and Operations Manager
- LL Cool J as Sam Hanna, NCIS Senior Field Agent, Second in Command

=== Recurring ===
- Vyto Ruginis as Arkady Kolcheck
- Peter Cambor as Dr Nate Getz, NCIS Special Agent
- Erik Palladino as Vostanik Sabatino
- Aunjanue Ellis as Michelle Hanna, "Quinn", Sam's wife
- Christopher Lambert as Marcel Janvier
- Alon Abutbul as Naseem Vaziri
- Jeronimo Spinx as Thompson
- Daniel Henney as Paul Angelo
- Mercedes Mason as Talia Del Campo
- Andrew Leeds as John Booker
- Matthew Del Negro as Jack Simon
- Elizabeth Bogush as Joelle Taylor

=== Guests ===
- Timothy V. Murphy as Isaak Sidorov
- Danny Trejo as Tuhon
- Michelle Trachtenberg as Lily Lockhart
- Wesam Keesh as Eshan Navid
- Natasha Alam as Veronica Pisconov
- Ernie Reyes Jr. as Jemadar Thapa

== Episodes ==
No. overall	No. in season	Title	Directed by	Written by	Original release date	Prod. code	U.S. viewers (millions)
97	1	"Ascension"	Terrence O'Hara	Frank Military	September 24, 2013	501	16.35
After events in "Descent" Kensi battles ex-Spetsnaz mercenary Maya Yerzov and former Russian policewoman Veronica Pisconov to save Michelle Hanna, who dangles outside a thirty-story building. Michelle climbs up and kills Veronica. Kensi chases Maya, who crashes her motorcycle. Granger convinces Maya she is paralyzed; Kensi cons her for Isaak Sidorov's location. Callen pressures Marcel Janvier to broker with Sidorov and Naseem Vaziri to locate and recover two 1960s-era Soviet 17 megaton nuclear bombs. Kensi and Granger prepare Sam and Marty, who Sidorov tortured. Michelle shoots Sam and Marty (in their vests), feigning loyalty to Sidorov before leaving to collect his gold. Janvier escapes through a shopping mall. Eric and Nell search for the ship containing the nukes; Hetty alerts NEST. Michelle contacts Eric from Sidorov's phone, blowing her cover. Sam and Marty leave the hospital, helping Kensi save Michelle from Sidorov and his henchman, Mikhail Andros. Callen and Granger chase Janvier, who took revenge on his Iranian captor Vaziri. Callen shoots Janvier trying to escape. The NEST team recovers the nukes from the Port of LA. Four months later: Serving three life sentences, Janvier vows to escape and exact revenge on Callen, saying, "The game is not over."
98	2	"Impact"	Jonathan Frakes	Sara Servi & R. Scott Gemmill	October 1, 2013	502	15.09
Hetty contacts operational psychologist Nate Getz to help Sam and Deeks come to terms with the torture both men received at the hands of Isaak Sidorov while the remaining members of the OSP investigate the killings of a former Navy Vice Admiral and a controversial journalist on board a private jet.
99	3	"Omni"	Larry Teng	Kyle Harimoto	October 8, 2013	503	14.84
The team must find who compromised a classified vaccine project from a bio tech company. Meanwhile, Deeks struggles with his emotions upon returning to the field.
100	4	"Reznikov, N."	Tony Wharmby	Shane Brennan	October 15, 2013	504	14.65
While investigating a kidnapping case of a man who claims to be Callen's father, the team soon find themselves in grave danger.
101	5	"Unwritten Rule"	Larry Teng	Joseph C. Wilson & Jordana Lewis Jaffe	October 22, 2013	425	14.92
Nell joins the team in the field, after they discover that the ransom demand for a former Navy officer's girlfriend, who has been kidnapped, is intelligence information, while Deeks remains unaware that he has broken one of Hetty's rules.
102	6	"Big Brother"	Steven DePaul	Jordana Lewis Jaffe	October 29, 2013	506	14.90
When a joint FBI/CIA/NCIS raid goes bad, the team suspects a mole. It turns out to be the work of a hacker with evidence leading to a fifteen year-old girl. Realizing the girl's hacking program has been stolen, Callen goes undercover at her private school to find out who is responsible. Ultimately the team captures her bogus male friend, who conned away the girl's hack phone long enough to sell the intel.
103	7	"The Livelong Day"	Dennis Smith	Joe Sachs	November 5, 2013	505	14.76
The team along with Homeland Security investigate the death of a security guard who worked at a train yard and they soon discover that they're searching for a mastermind who may be planning to launch a terrorist attack on a train.
104	8	"Fallout"	Diana C. Valentine	Joseph C. Wilson	November 12, 2013	507	14.88
When a nuclear device goes missing, the team jump into action to find it before it falls into the wrong hands, while Hetty realizes that someone from her past has returned, someone who could very well jeopardize her career. Once they find that person, he admits that he sold the nuclear device to Russia. The episode ends with the team covertly stealing it back from the Russian consulate, almost failing and causing an international incident.
105	9	"Recovery"	Paul A. Kaufman	Gil Grant	November 19, 2013	508	15.00
While investigating the death of a Naval officer, Kensi and Deeks go undercover at a rehab center.
106	10	"The Frozen Lake"	John Peter Kousakis	Dave Kalstein	November 26, 2013	509	12.32
Sam and Callen ask a Gurkha for help retrieving a thumb drive. Deeks and Kensi decide to try to find a balance but Kensi is reassigned indefinitely.
107	11	"Iron Curtain Rising"	Tony Wharmby	Jordana Lewis Jaffe	December 10, 2013	510	15.24
Upon discovering that a former Romanian communist leader and suspected war criminal is now living in Los Angeles under a false identity, the team attempt to capture the criminal before he disappears again. Kensi arrives in Afghanistan where she receives her assignment.
108	12	"Merry Evasion"	Karen Gaviola	Kyle Harimoto	December 17, 2013	511	15.58
A senator's daughter is the victim of a home invasion. The team investigate to determine if it was a random crime or a targeted attack due to her father's crackdown on international cyber warfare. Meanwhile, Kensi's holiday spirit changes after she receives a surprise Christmas gift.
109	13	"Allegiance"	Eric Laneuville	Frank Military & Andrew Bartels	January 14, 2014	512	15.87
A federal agent tied to hawala, an ancient system of money transfer, is murdered with the resulting investigation reuniting the team in Los Angeles with Kensi and Granger, who are in Afghanistan.
110	14	"War Cries"	James Hanlon	R. Scott Gemmill	February 4, 2014	513	16.30
When two private military contractors are murdered, the team's investigation leads them back to one of their unsolved cases (from "Impact") with the search bringing them to a suspect who eventually puts one of their own in grave danger while Sam sets up Callen on a blind date.
111	15	"Tuhon"	Christine Moore	Dave Kalstein	February 25, 2014	514	13.15
Sam and Callen search in Mexico for a diplomatic murder suspect. Nate and Deeks assist the pair from Los Angeles.
112	16	"Fish Out of Water"	Terrence O'Hara	Joe Sachs	March 4, 2014	515	14.37
Sam and Callen investigate the explosion of a fish market with the help of an undercover DEA Agent Talia Del Campo. In Afghanistan, Kensi and Granger are on the case of a helicopter crash.
113	17	"Between the Lines"	Dennis Smith	Joseph C. Wilson	March 18, 2014	516	14.21
The team must find a mole when an undercover agent, later found to be working for the ATF, is killed by a gang. Meanwhile in Afghanistan, Granger is worried when Kensi disappears.
114	18	"Zero Days"	Tony Wharmby	Andrew Bartels	March 25, 2014	517	15.54
The team must investigate when one of Eric's friends is attacked. In Afghanistan, Kensi sees someone from her past.
115	19	"Spoils of War"	Frank Military	Frank Military	April 1, 2014	518	15.31
The team travels to Afghanistan after learning of Kensi's disappearance.
116	20	"Windfall"	Eric A. Pot	Gil Grant	April 8, 2014	519	14.56
The team investigates a marine who had embezzled money. Kensi is forced to work with Eric in the Operations Center after returning from Afghanistan, while Nell is teamed with Deeks.
117	21	"Three Hearts"	Diana C. Valentine	Dave Kalstein & Kyle Harimoto	April 15, 2014	520	14.69
An undercover NCIS agent is taken into custody when he is suspected of working for the smuggler he is supposed to be investigating. Meanwhile, Kensi and Deeks discuss their relationship when she returns to the field.
118	22	"One More Chance"	Tony Wharmby	David J. North	April 29, 2014	521	14.83
A ten year-old girl Sam once provided protection detail for in Saudi Arabia goes missing, and he's convinced her disappearance is directly connected to the theft of software for a new unmanned-aerial vehicle being developed by her engineer mother.
119	23	"Exposure"	Robert Florio	Joseph C. Wilson & Jordana Lewis Jaffe	May 6, 2014	522	14.11
An explosion at a military charity event kills a soldier and another man. Thought to be a terrorist attack, the team is tasked to find those responsible.
120	24	"Deep Trouble"	Larry Teng	R. Scott Gemmill	May 13, 2014	523	14.85
Angel and Luis "El Conquistador" Morales spew alcohol flames as submarine engineer LCDR. Steven Hill falls from the bridge. His wife Sarah reported him missing for weeks. Autopsy reveals cocaine overdose. From cellphone activity, Eric identifies James Martinez, who they apprehend after questioning Mission Street gang leader Salazar. From engine acoustic signatures, Eric traces the car used to dump Hill to Herrenvolk Brotherhood white supremacist, Michael Wilson. Hetty is assigned administrative leave pending a full investigation of the White Ghost incident, leaving Nell instructions. Wilson throws a grenade, which Sam returns, blowing up Wilson's house, where they discover Jennifer Anderson's corpse. DEA Agent Talia Del Campo informs, Wilson dealt in meth and formed alliances with other gangs. OSP learns Jennifer's husband Charles was extorted to build a submarine by unknown persons. Talia believes Herrenvolk colluded with the Brenasolo Cartel to smuggle Colombian cocaine. Nell traces college student Ali Hanna's car to a San Pedro wet dock rental for ship repair. Exploring the sub, Hanna kills Ahmed shooting at Callen. Rather than drugs, they find it filled with ammonium nitrate explosives. Jabril, Ali, and Yusef prevent their escape as they dive and depart. To be continued...

== Production ==
=== Development ===
NCIS: Los Angeles was renewed for a fifth season on March 27, 2013.

=== Casting ===
On February 6, 2013, it was announced that Miguel Ferrer was promoted to series regular for the fifth season of NCIS: Los Angeles.

=== Writing ===
The Afghanistan storyline was actually not originally part of the plan for season 5, but added to keep Kensi Blye on the show despite actress Daniela Ruah's pregnancy.

== Reception ==
=== Ratings ===
Viewership and ratings per episode of NCIS: Los Angeles season 5
No.	Title	Air date	Rating/share (18–49)	Viewers (millions)	DVR (18–49)	DVR viewers (millions)	Total (18–49)	Total viewers (millions)
1	"Ascension"	September 24, 2013	3.0/8	16.35	—N/a	2.81	—N/a	19.17
2	"Impact"	October 1, 2013	2.7/7	15.09	—N/a	3.12	—N/a	18.20
3	"Omni"	October 8, 2013	2.6/7	14.84	—N/a	2.72	—N/a	17.56
4	"Reznikov, N."	October 15, 2013	2.6/7	14.65	—N/a	2.92	—N/a	17.57
5	"Unwritten Rule"	October 22, 2013	2.5/7	14.92	—N/a	2.60	—N/a	17.52
6	"Big Brother"	October 29, 2013	2.6/7	14.90	—N/a	2.77	—N/a	17.67
7	"The Livelong Day"	November 5, 2013	2.4/6	14.76	—N/a	3.17	—N/a	17.94
8	"Fallout"	November 12, 2013	2.4/6	14.88	—N/a	2.98	—N/a	17.87
9	"Recovery"	November 19, 2013	2.5/7	14.99	—N/a	3.08	—N/a	18.07
10	"The Frozen Lake"	November 26, 2013	2.4/7	12.32	0.8	3.25	3.2	15.58
11	"Iron Curtain Rising"	December 10, 2013	2.4/7	15.24	0.9	3.22	3.3	18.46
12	"Merry Evasion"	December 17, 2013	2.4/7	15.58	0.8	2.92	3.2	18.50
13	"Allegiance"	January 14, 2014	2.4/6	15.87	0.9	3.28	3.3	19.16
14	"War Cries"	February 4, 2014	2.8/8	16.30	1.0	3.30	3.8	19.64
15	"Tuhon"	February 25, 2014	2.3/6	13.15	0.9	3.51	3.2	16.67
16	"Fish Out of Water"	March 4, 2014	2.1/6	14.37	—N/a	3.32	—N/a	17.69
17	"Between the Lines"	March 18, 2014	2.3/6	14.21	—N/a	2.89	—N/a	17.10
18	"Zero Days"	March 25, 2014	2.4/7	15.54	0.9	3.14	3.3	18.68
19	"Spoils of War"	April 1, 2014	2.4/7	15.31	—N/a	2.94	—N/a	18.24
20	"Windfall"	April 8, 2014	2.3/7	14.56	0.9	2.91	3.2	17.47
21	"Three Hearts"	April 15, 2014	2.1/6	14.69	0.9	3.01	3.0	17.70
22	"One More Chance"	April 29, 2014	2.1/6	14.83	0.8	2.83	2.9	17.67
23	"Exposure"	May 6, 2014	2.2/6	14.11	0.8	2.81	3.0	16.92
24	"Deep Trouble"	May 13, 2014	2.5/7	14.85	0.8	2.94	3.3	17.79

== Home video release ==
NCIS: Los Angeles: The Fifth Season
Set details	Special features	
DVD release dates
Region 1	Region 2	Region 4
August 19, 2014	August 18, 2014	August 20, 2014
