= Unwritten Rule =

Unwritten Rule may refer to:

- Unwritten Rule (band)
- Unwritten Rule (NCIS: Los Angeles)

== See also ==
- Unspoken rule
