= Shane Brennan =

Australian television producer & writer (born 1957)

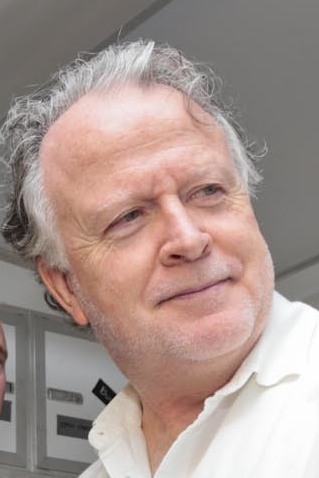
- Brennan in 2015
- Born: January 20, 1957 (age 69); Bendigo, Victoria, Australia
- Occupations: Television writer and producer

Shane Brennan (born January 20, 1957, in Bendigo, Victoria, Australia) is an Australian television writer and producer, best known as the executive producer of the CBS drama NCIS, as well as the creator of the NCIS spin-off series, NCIS: Los Angeles.

Brennan's other television credits include Special Squad, The Flying Doctors, All Together Now, King & Maxwell, State Coroner, Stingers, Flipper, CSI: Miami, and Summerland. Beginning as a journalist for the Australian Broadcasting Corporation (ABC), by 1981, he had abandoned journalism for television scriptwriting.

From the mid-1990s, he worked on American cable shows shot in Australia – of which Flipper is the only named example in the IMDb. That gave him exposure, friends in the United States and an agent. As he said, "I started travelling backwards and forwards for about five years – usually four or five times a year, coming for two or three weeks at a time, doing lots and lots of meetings, all at my expense."

In 2003, Brennan became supervising producer for CSI: Miami, and then went on to succeed Donald P. Bellisario as the showrunner on NCIS, handing the day-to-day showrunner operations over to Gary Glasberg after season 8. He then created and became the showrunner of NCIS: Los Angeles, while remaining an executive producer of NCIS until the end of the eleventh season. His last credited episode as executive producer of NCIS was the season 11 finale episode, "Honor Thy Father". In 2011, his production company signed a deal with CBS.

In July 2016, it was announced that Brennan was stepping down as showrunner of NCIS: Los Angeles and that he was handing the reins over to R. Scott Gemmill. In February 2022, it was announced that Brennan would lead a new NCIS: Sydney set in Sydney.

Brennan was elected president of the Australian Writers' Guild in January 2019.

== Filmography ==
=== Film ===
Title	Year	Credited as	Notes
Title	Year	Writer	Notes
Clowning Around	1992	Yes	

=== Television ===
The numbers in writing credits refer to the number of episodes.

Title	Year	Credited as			Network	Notes
Title	Year	Creator	Writer	Executive producer	Network	Notes
Special Squad	1984–85	No	Yes (5)	No	Network 10	
Prime Time	1986	No	Yes	No	Nine Network	unknown episodes
A Country Practice	1986–88	No	Yes (13)	No	Seven Network	
In Between	1987	No	Yes (2)	No	SBS	miniseries
The Flying Doctors	1987–91	No	Yes (19)	No	Nine Network	
Embassy	1990	No	Yes	No	ABC	unknown episodes
All Together Now	1991–93	No	Yes (18)	No	Nine Network	
Bony	1992	No	Yes (3)	No	Seven Network	
Ocean Girl	1994	No	Yes (1)	No	Network 10	
Blue Heelers	1995	No	Yes (1)	No	Seven Network	
The Man from Snowy River	1995–96	No	Yes (7)	No	Nine Network	
State Coroner	1997–98	No	Yes (4)	No	Network 10	
Good Guys, Bad Guys	1998	No	Yes (1)	No	Nine Network	
Flipper	1998–2000	No	Yes (11)	No	Syndication	supervising producer (1998–99: 2 episodes)
Witch Hunt	1999	—N/a	Yes	No	Network 10	Television film, associate producer
Crash Zone	1999	No	Yes (1)	No	Seven Network	
Stingers	2000–03	No	Yes (19)	No	Nine Network	
Tales of the South Seas	2000	No	Yes (1)	No	Network 10	
The Lost World	2002	No	Yes (1)	No	Syndication	
McLeod's Daughters	2003	No	Yes (1)	No	Nine Network	
CSI: Miami	2003–04	No	Yes (4)	No	CBS	supervising producer (24 episodes)
Summerland	2005	No	Yes (2)	No	The WB	supervising producer (13 episodes)
One Tree Hill	2006	No	No	No	The WB	co-executive producer (episode: "With Tired Eyes, Tired Minds, Tired Souls, We Slept")
NCIS	2006–15	No	Yes (11)	Yes	CBS	consulting producer (2006: 8 episodes), co-executive producer (2006–07: 16 episodes), executive producer (2007–15: 166 episodes)
NCIS: Los Angeles	2009–2023	Yes	Yes (17)	Yes	CBS	
King & Maxwell	2013	developer	Yes (2)	Yes	TNT	
NCIS: Sydney	2023	TBA	TBA	Yes	Paramount+ Network 10; CBS	
