= Barrett Foa =

American singer, actor, and dancer

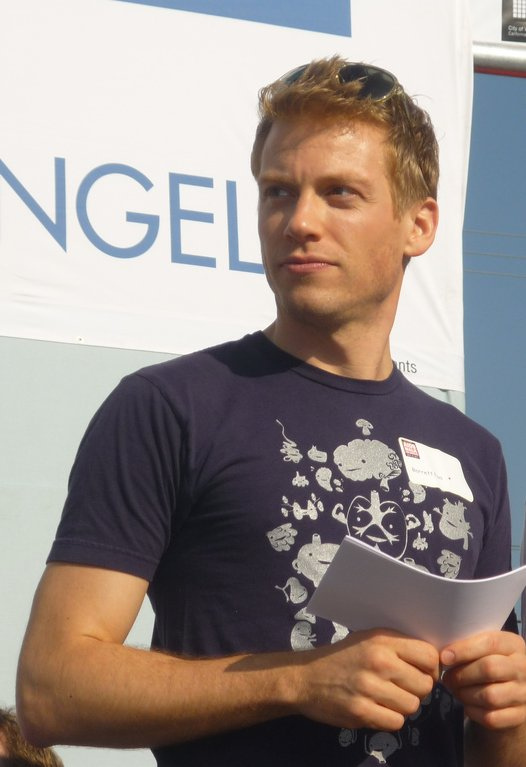
- Foa in 2015
- Born: Barrett Conrad Foa; September 18, 1977 (age 49); Manhattan, New York, U.S.
- Education: University of Michigan (BFA)
- Occupations: Actor; singer; dancer
- Years active: 1995–present

Barrett Conrad Foa (born September 18, 1977) is an American singer, dancer, and actor. He is best known for his performances in Broadway theatre. He has played many leading characters in Off-Broadway and regional theatre productions. He has appeared in multiple Broadway shows, including Mamma Mia! and as Princeton and Rod in Avenue Q. From 2009 to 2021, he portrayed Eric Beale on the military police procedural NCIS: Los Angeles.

== Early life and education ==
Barrett Conrad Foa was born and raised in Manhattan, New York. He is the son of Conrad Foa, an international insurance broker, former musician and Army veteran, and mother Linda Rimanich, an executive, editor and author. Foa's parents are both Manhattan natives, community and civic activists, philanthropists, and organizers in the Democratic party.

Foa graduated from The Dalton School, a K-12 college preparatory school in New York City. His interest in musical theater developed during his high school years. He was involved with the arts—especially musical theater—as a hobby, "a fun, non-athletic, after-school activity that kept me busy and helped me get a little attention". He attended Interlochen Center for the Arts—a Northern Michigan school for music, dance, writing, film, visual arts and theater—during his four summers of high school in the 1990s. According to Foa, his experience at Interlochen "instilled the passion and the drive that I feel toward my craft and my business. Finally, I was surrounded by people who were obsessed with something that no else back home even understood. I got excited and I got voracious. 'Other weirdos like me!' I still carry that hunger inside me to this day." Over many summers, he had featured parts in plays, musicals, and operettas. Among other skills, he learned to sing in an operatic style for the play Lend Me a Tenor. As an alumnus, he set up the Barrett Foa Musical Theatre Scholarship to be given annually to a high school camper studying musical theatre.

Foa received his first paid job at the New London Barn Playhouse, a summer stock theatre in New Hampshire, after an audition at StrawHat Audition in 1995, which he thinks was "instrumental in moving his career forward". He played an effeminate version of evil Mordred in Camelot. Foa attended the University of Michigan in Ann Arbor (UMich), earning his bachelor in fine arts (BFA) in Musical Theatre in 1999. He kept doing summer stock through his college years and had earned his Equity card by the time he got his bachelor's degree. During his junior year, he studied acting and William Shakespeare for a semester at the Royal Academy of Dramatic Arts in London. After graduating from college, he returned to New York City.

== Career ==
Foa has played many leading roles in plays and musicals Off-Broadway, and in regional theatre. His regional credits include Sweet Charity, The Music Man, Camelot, Pirates! The Musical, The Lady in Question, Much Ado About Nothing, and The Fantasticks. His Off-Broadway credits, as of February 2020, include Buyer & Cellar, The Drunken City, Godspell, and Tio Pepe (aka Somewhere). (Note: Tio Pepe is a stage play by Matthew Lopez, directed by Caitlin Moon, enacted at the 2008 Summer Play Festival.)

Foa got his break playing Jesus in the 2000 Off-Broadway revival of the musical Godspell for the 30th anniversary. He is on the cast album as well. His Broadway theatre debut was in 2001 as a cast member in the original production of Mamma Mia!, a musical based on 22 pop songs of ABBA. After months with the show, Foa left to accept a three-month job at TheatreWorks in Palo Alto, California, where he created the lead role in a musical called Kept with music by Henry Kreiger and lyrics by Bill Russell.

After playing Matt in The Fantasticks at The Muny in St. Louis, Foa was picked to play Claudio in a dual production of Much Ado About Nothing at Hartford Stage and the Shakespeare Theatre Company in Washington, D.C. In 2003 Foa was in the Cupid and Psyche-inspired four person, Off-Broadway show of the same name which was also an updated Greek mythology and comedy. He was also in the musical Camelot as the evil Mordred portrayed with a thick Scottish burr who is a punk bastard.

Foa has performed on Broadway hundreds of times over a ten-year span; in the mid-2000s as Princeton and Rod in Avenue Q, and then was offered the role of Leaf Coneybear in The 25th Annual Putnam County Spelling Bee. He was the first actor cast in Avenue Q who had not been a puppeteer first, "It was a bit of a scary experience going into a room full of puppeteers and saying: 'I'm going to be your new lead.' They put me into an intensive two-day course and I proved at the audition I could fit in with everyone else. I got to be the understudy for a year". He took over a lead role in Avenue Q in 2005, and in 2006, a lead in The 25th Annual Putnam County Spelling Bee.

He played his last performance as Frederic in Pirates! an updated version of The Pirates of Penzance, on July 8, 2007, at the Paper Mill Playhouse. He played Karel in The Lady In Question, a play by and starring Charles Busch from August 14 through September 2, 2007.

From March 13 to April 20, 2008, he played Eddie in The Drunken City at Playwrights Horizons. He also played Tu-Ping in a workshop presentation of The Nightingale with music by Duncan Sheik and book and lyrics by Steven Sater at the New York Theatre Workshop directed by James Lapine.

In May 2008, he played Jordy in a workshop of Giant, a new musical with music and lyrics by Michael John LaChiusa and book by Sybille Pearson, based on the Edna Ferber novel and the movie with Rock Hudson, Elizabeth Taylor, and James Dean.

He had established himself on Broadway, and then took some friends' advice and moved to Los Angeles in the late 2000s to pursue television work. He soon picked up cameo and supporting roles in Numb3rs, The Closer, and HBO's Entourage.

From 2009 to 2021, Foa portrayed Eric Beale, a computer, and technology "wizard" on the military police procedural show about the Naval Criminal Investigative Service, NCIS: Los Angeles. It was the first spin-off of NCIS, at the time the second most popular show in the country. The show is a procedural crime drama, but coupled with a "kind of a workplace comedy going on". He auditioned for the operational psychologist character Nate Getz but the producers wrote the Beale part for him instead. It was his first stable job in his life with a ten-months a year, 9-5p schedule. His recurring role in NCIS: Los Angeles was upgraded to a series regular in the middle of the first season after twelve episodes. In April 2011 his character, in a series first, switched from his station in the operations center—and his casual surf wear—to do field work including using a gun. In May 2021, after the 12th season finale of NCIS: LA, Foa announced that he was leaving the series after twelve seasons.

Foa continues to do live performing in addition to his television work, "I'm used to having a live connection with an audience on a stage, and also after the show. ... There's more of an immediate personal touch." In January 2011, Foa headlined the musical stage show Sincerely, John Hughes, a tribute to the films and soundtracks of film director John Hughes. Foa is co-writer, producer and star of For the Record: John Hughes, a live musical event featuring scenes and songs from the movies of the 1980s film director; it played multiple sold-out runs in LA and NYC.

In Summer 2012 he bought a $1.4 million two-bedroom "architectural residence" above the Sunset Strip, he sold it a year later for almost $1.7 million.

In July 2013, Foa played Harold Hill, the lead in the musical The Music Man, staged by the Connecticut Repertory Theatre. From May to August 2014, Foa played the lead in Jonathan Tolins' one-man Off-Broadway comedy Buyer & Cellar about an actor who manages a basement mall in Barbra Streisand's home. Her Malibu home's basement has a mall of quaint shops, "purely for her own amusement" built to house her extensive collections.

For NCIS: Los Angeles' seventh season (2015-6), Foa's character, usually seen at headquarters, is trained for field work, including weapons handling. In May 2016 Foa bought a three-story, two-bedroom contemporary home in Silver Lake for $1.35 million.

In early 2019, Foa had a guest starring role on Will & Grace as Will Truman (Eric McCormack)'s love interest—and fellow teacher Paul. In May 2019 he bought a $2.1 million 1950s three-bedroom ranch-style home in the foothills above Beachwood Canyon.

In 2019 he was given a leave of absence from NCIS so he did not have to commute from St. Louis, Missouri where he was playing Prior Walter, the lead in Tony Kushner's two-act, seven-hour play Angels in America. In February 2020 Foa led a cabaret benefit night, "Barrett Foa Has Friends!", for the LA-based PAWS which aids people with chronic diseases care for their pets.

== Personal life ==
In February 2019, Foa publicly came out as gay on social media.

Barrett's older brother by five years, Justin, is the fifth generation owner and CEO of Foa & Son, an international insurance brokerage firm established in 1861. Their mother, Linda, died of breast cancer in June 2016.

Barrett bought an "unconventional architectural" three-story, two bedrooms home in Silver Lake, Los Angeles in 2016, that was just built, for $1.4 million. He listed it for sale in September 2020 at $1.7 million. In May 2019, he bought another home, a newly rehabilitated 1950s single-story three bedroom ranch-style structure in the foothills above L.A.'s Beachwood Canyon for $2.09 million.

In addition to various workshops and readings, Foa donates his time and talents to community causes and non-profit theatre companies and organizations, including Broadway Cares/Equity Fights AIDS and The Actors' Fund.

== Filmography ==
Year	Title	Role	Notes
2007	Six Degrees	Dylan	Episode: "Get a Room"
2008	Prop 8: The Musical	California Gays and The People That Love Them	Short film
2009	Schoolhouse Rock!	Vocals	Episode: "A Tiny Urban Zoo"
2009	Numbers	Andrew Gibbons	Episode: "First Law"
2009	The Closer	Travis Myers	Episode: "Walking Back the Cat"
2009	NCIS	Eric Beale	2 episodes
2009–2021	NCIS: Los Angeles	Eric Beale	Main cast (280 episodes)
2009–2010	Entourage	Matt Wolpert	2 episodes
2011	Submissions Only	Gil Bure	Episode: "Yore So Bad"
2013	My Synthesized Life	Craig Carter	2 episodes
2019	Will & Grace	Paul	Episode: "The Pursuit of Happiness"
2025	The Residence	Elliot Morgan	8 episodes

== See also ==
- Candida Moss
