= Dennis Smith (director) =

American television director and cinematographer

- Other name: Dennis L. Smith
- Occupations: Television director, cinematographer, camera operator
- Years active: 1971–present

Dennis L. Smith is an American television director, cinematographer and camera operator.

Smith began his career as a news photojournalists for ABC winning United Press InternatIonal and Associated Press "Best Newsfilm of the Year" awards for his Documentaries. He also contributed to winning two George Foster Peabody's from the University of Georgia.

As a camera operator he worked on the films Stir Crazy (1980), Revenge of the Nerds (1984), License to Drive (1988) and Home Alone and Home Alone 2: Lost in New York (1990). He continued his career as a cinematographer/director of photography on the David E. Kelley series Picket Fences (in which he made his directorial debut) and The Practice.

Some of Smith's other directing credits include episodes of: Boston Legal, JAG, Numb3rs, The Vampire Diaries, Fringe, NCIS, NCIS: Los Angeles and NCIS: New Orleans.

== Televisionography ==
- Picket Fences (1996)
- The Practice (1998)
- JAG (2002)
- NCIS (2003)
- Dr. Vegas (2004)
- Boston Legal (2004)
- Numbers (2005)
- Just Legal (2006)
- Moonlight (2007)
- Fringe (2009)
- The Vampire Diaries (2010)
- Royal Pains (2010)
- 90210 (2010)
- NCIS: Los Angeles (2010)
- Person of Interest (2011)
- King & Maxwell (2013)
- NCIS: New Orleans (2014)
- Victims of Silence (2016)
- Station 19 (2018)
