= Terrence O'Hara =

American actor and director (1945–2022)

- Born: December 25, 1945; Newark, New Jersey, U.S.
- Died: December 5, 2022 (aged 76); Los Angeles, California, U.S.
- Occupations: Film and television director and actor
- Spouse: Shanna Reed (m. 1986)
- Children: 1

Terrence O'Hara (December 25, 1945 – December 5, 2022) was an American film and television director and actor. He worked on Smallville, CSI: Crime Scene Investigation, Voyagers!, NCIS, and other programs. He was married to television actress Shanna Reed.

O'Hara died from cancer on December 5, 2022, at age 76.

== Partial filmography ==
=== Director ===
- Grimm (2012–2017)
- Dollhouse (2010)
- NCIS: Los Angeles (2009–2022)
- The Blacklist (2015–2019)
- The Unit (2009)
- Sons of Anarchy (2008)
- CSI: Crime Scene Investigation (2005–2006)
- NCIS (2003–2022)
- Angel (2002–2004)
- The Shield (2003 & 2008)
- Heroes (2007)
- Smallville (2001–2007)
- JAG (1999–2004)
- Lie to Me (2009)
- Dr. Quinn, Medicine Woman (1996–1997)

=== Actor ===
- Ryan's Hope (1978)
- Mrs. Columbo (1979)
- The Greatest American Hero (1982)
- Voyagers! (1982)
- Naked Vengeance (1985)
- The Devastator (1986)
