= Karen Gaviola =

American television producer and director

- Occupations: Television producer and director
- Years active: 1999–present

Karen Gaviola is an American television producer and director. She is known for working across a wide stylistic range, spanning all genres of television: action, fantasy, intimate drama, crime procedurals and science fiction. Of note are the performances she gets from the actors in her episodes and her attention to story.

== Early life and education ==
Karen is a second-generation Filipina American. Her father was an aerospace engineer and her mother an accountant. She is a graduate of Immaculate Heart High School (Los Angeles) and Harvard College with a degree in Visual and Environmental Studies.

== Career ==
Her break into the business came through acceptance into the Directors Guild of America Assistant Director Training Program. Upon graduation, she worked her way up as a freelance assistant director. Her directing break came on NYPD Blue.

Since then, Gaviola has directed over 150 TV episodes, including the shows The Boys, Gen V, The Walking Dead, Cold case, Lucifer, Shadow and Bone, Empire, Sons of Anarchy, The Blacklist, Hawaii Five-0, CSI: Crime Scene Investigation, Grimm, Criminal Minds and Chicago Fire.

She has also worked as a co-executive producer/director on a number of projects including Lucifer, Hawaii Five-0, Magnum P.I. and Love Is for Oprah Winfrey and Paper Girls.

Karen won the 2007 NAACP Image Award for directing the episode "The Whole Truth" of the ABC hit series Lost. Gaviola was also nominated for the 2013 WIN (Women's Image Network) Award for best directing of the "Georgia on My Mind" episode of the Shonda Rhimes series Private Practice.

Gaviola was elected in June 2013 to the National Board of the Directors Guild of America. She served four terms as a Board Member and three terms as a Board Alternate. She chaired the DGA Safety Committee, which produced the template for set safety standards in California, New York and Georgia. She is also active with the DGA TV Creative Rights Committee, the Women's Steering Committee, the Asian American Committee, and the Diversity Task Force. In 2022, Gaviola was named as co-chair of the 2023 DGA/AMPTP Negotiations Committee. She will be serving in that role again for the 2026 DGA/AMPTP negotiations. Karen is also a member of the Producers Guild of America, the Academy of Television Arts and Sciences, and Film Independent.

Karen is also a member of the Producers Guild of America, the Academy of Television Arts and Sciences, and Film Independent.

== Filmography ==
| Year | Title | Notes |
|---|---|---|
| 1999–2001 | NYPD Blue | 3 episodes |
| 2002 | Providence | 1 episode |
| 2002 | Strong Medicine | 1 episode |
| 2003–2009 | CSI: Miami | 16 episodes |
| 2004 | Cold Case | 2 episode |
| 2005 | The Inside | 1 episode |
| 2005 | CSI: NY | 1 episode |
| 2005 | Medical Investigation | 1 episode |
| 2005 | Close to Home | 1 episode |
| 2006 | Crossing Jordan | 1 episode |
| 2006 | Alias | 1 episode |
| 2006 | Justice | 1 episode |
| 2006 | Bones | 1 episode |
| 2006–2007 | Lost | 2 episodes |
| 2006–2008 | Prison Break | 4 episodes |
| 2007 | The Unit | 1 episode |
| 2007 | Lincoln Heights | 1 episode |
| 2007 | Law & Order | 1 episode |
| 2007 | Cane | 1 episode |
| 2007 | Journeyman | 1 episode |
| 2008 | Eleventh Hour | 1 episode |
| 2008 | Brothers & Sisters | 1 episode |
| 2008 | Without a Trace | 2 episodes |
| 2009 | Ghost Whisperer | 1 episode |
| 2009 | Criminal Minds | 2 episodes |
| 2009 | Dark Blue | 2 episodes |
| 2009 | Lie to Me | 1 episode |
| 2009 | Castle | 1 episode |
| 2009 | Miami Medical | 1 episode |
| 2010 | Private Practice | 1 episode |
| 2010 | The Forgotten | 1 episode |
| 2010 | NCIS: Los Angeles | 1 episode |
| 2010 | Chase | 2 episodes |
| 2010 | The Whole Truth | 2 episodes |
| 2011 | Private Practice | 1 episode |
| 2011 | The Cape | 1 episode |
| 2011 | Off the Map | 1 episode |
| 2011 | Blue Bloods | 1 episode |
| 2011 | Alphas | 1 episode |
| 2011 | Unforgettable | 1 episode |
| 2011 | Criminal Minds | 1 episode |
| 2011 | NCIS: Los Angeles | 2 episodes |
| 2011 | Terra Nova | 2 episodes |
| 2012 | Private Practice | 2 episodes |
| 2012 | NCIS: Los Angeles | 1 episodes |
| 2012 | Criminal Minds | 1 episode |
| 2012 | Nikita | 1 episode |
| 2012 | Grimm | 1 episode |
| 2012 | Sons Of Anarchy | 1 episode |
| 2013 | Criminal Minds | 1 episode |
| 2013 | Chicago Fire | 2 episodes |
| 2013 | Chicago PD | 2 episodes |
| 2013 | CSI | 3 episodes |
| 2013 | Golden Boy | 1 episode |
| 2013 | Grimm | 1 episode |
| 2014 | The Blacklist | 3 episodes |
| 2014 | Legends | 1 episode |
| 2014 | The Lottery | 1 episode |
| 2014 | Criminal Minds | 1 episode |
| 2014 | Gotham | 1 episode |
| 2015 | The Blacklist | 1 episode |
| 2015 | Agents of S.H.I.E.L.D. | 1 episode |
| 2015 | NCIS: Los Angeles | 1 episode |
| 2015 | Grimm | 1 episode |
| 2015 | Supergirl | 1 episode |
| 2015 | Hell on Wheels | 1 episodes |
| 2016 | Blindspot | 2 episodes |
| 2016 | NCIS: Los Angeles | 1 episode |
| 2016 | Grimm | 1 episode |
| 2016 | Lucifer | 2 episodes |
| 2016 | Animal Kingdom | 1 episode |
| 2017 | Lucifer | 3 episodes |
| 2017 | The Gifted | 1 episode |
| 2017 | Empire | 1 episode |
| 2018 | Colony | 1 episode |
| 2018 | Love Is | 1 episode |
| 2018-2019 | Magnum P.I. | 2 episodes |
| 2019-2020 | Hawaii Five-0 | 6 episodes |
| 2019-2020 | Soundtrack | 2 episodes |
| 2019-2020 | Lucifer | 1 episode |
| 2021 | Debris | Episode: "In Universe" |
| 2021 | Station 19 | Episode #54: "Here It Comes Again" |
| 2021 | Paper Girls | 2 Episodes |
| 2022 | The Walking Dead | Episode: "Variant" |
| 2023 | Shadow and Bone | 2 Episodes |
| 2024 | Parish | Episode: "A Good Man" |
| 2024 | The Boys | Episode: "Life Among the Septics"; Episode: "Dirty Business" |
| 2025 | Gen V | Episode: "H is For Human"; Episode: "The Kids Are Not All Right" |
| 2026 | The Boys | Episode: "Every One of You Sons of Bitches"; Episode: "King of Hell" |
