= List of horror anthology films =

This is a list of horror anthology films.

== History ==
The influential Dead of Night (1945) popularized the format for horror anthology films, which had existed as far back as 1919's Unheimliche Geschichten and Fritz Lang's 1921 Der müde Tod. Like those two, 1924's Waxworks came out of the Weimar Republic; they included some of the top actors of the day, such as Conrad Veidt, Lil Dagover, and Emil Jannings. British company Amicus made several such films in the 1960s and 1970s. From Beyond the Grave (1974), Trilogy of Terror (1975), Heavy Metal (1981), Twilight Zone: The Movie (1983), Creepshow (1982), The Company of Wolves (1984), Creepshow 2 (1987), Tales from the Darkside: The Movie (1990) and Tales from the Hood (1995) are various horror-themed anthologies from the '70s to the '90s.

== List ==
Title	Segments	Director(s)	Actors	Premiere	Country	Notes / Ref.
Unheimliche Geschichten (lit. Uncanny Stories; English international title: Eerie Tales)	"The Apparition" "The Hand" "The Black Cat" (after Edgar Allan Poe) "The Suicide Club" (after Robert Louis Stevenson) "Der Spuk" ("The Spectre")	Richard Oswald	Conrad Veidt; Anita Berber; Reinhold Schünzel	1919	Weimar Republic	
Der müde Tod (lit. Weary Death; English international title: Destiny)	"The Story of the First Light" "The Story of the Second Light" "The Story of the Third Light"	Fritz Lang	Lil Dagover; Walter Janssen; Bernhard Goetzke	1921	Weimar Republic	
Das Wachsfigurenkabinett (Waxworks)	"Harun al-Rashid" "Ivan the Terrible" "Jack the Ripper"	Paul Leni; Leo Birinski	Emil Jannings; Conrad Veidt; Werner Krauss; William Dieterle	1924	Weimar Republic	
Dead of Night	"The Hearse Driver" after E. F. Benson "The Christmas Party" "The Haunted Mirror" "The Golfer's Story" after H. G. Wells's "The Ventriloquist’s Dummy"	Basil Dearden; Alberto Cavalcanti; Robert Hamer; Charles Crichton	Roland Culver; Judy Kelly; Sally Ann Howes; Ralph Michael	1945	United Kingdom	
The Devil's Messenger	Combining three episodes of the 1959 Swedish television series 13 Demon Street	Herbert L. Strock	Lon Chaney Jr. Karen Kadler; John Crawford; Michael Hinn	1961	Sweden; United States	
Tales of Terror	"Morella" "The Black Cat" "The Facts in the Case of M. Valdemar"	Roger Corman	Vincent Price; Peter Lorre; Basil Rathbone; Debra Paget	1962	United States	
I tre volti della paura (Black Sabbath)	"Il telefono" after F.G. Snyder "I Wurdalak" after A. Tolstoy "La goccia d'acqua" after Anton Chekhov	Mario Bava	Michèle Mercier; Boris Karloff; Mark Damon; Jacqueline Pierreux	1963	Italy	
Kwaidan (怪談)	"The Black Hair" "The Woman of the Snow" "Hoichi the Earless" "In a Cup of Tea"	Masaki Kobayashi	* Tatsuya Nakadai; Rentarō Mikuni; Tetsurō Tamba; Keiko Kishi; Michiyo Aratama; Misako Watanabe; Yoichi Hayashi; Katsuo Nakamura; Osamu Takizawa; Haruko Sugimura; Nakamura Kan'emon; Nakamura Ganjirō II	1964	Japan	
Dr. Terror's House of Horrors	"Werewolf" "Creeping Vine" "Voodoo" "Disembodied Hand" "Vampire"	Freddie Francis	Neil McCallum; Ann Bell; Roy Castle; Christopher Lee; Max Adrian	1965	United Kingdom	
Torture Garden	"Enoch" after Robert Bloch "Terror Over Hollywood" "Mr. Steinway" "The Man Who Collected Poe"	Freddie Francis	Jack Palance; Burgess Meredith; Peter Cushing	1967	United Kingdom	
Spirits of the Dead	"Metzengerstein" after Edgar Allan Poe "William Wilson" "Toby Dammit"	Roger Vadim; Louis Malle; Federico Fellini	Jane Fonda; Peter Fonda; Alain Delon; Brigitte Bardot; Terence Stamp	1968	France; Italy	
Night Gallery	"The Cemetery" "Eyes" "The Escape Route"	Boris Sagal; Steven Spielberg; Barry Shear	Roddy McDowall; Joan Crawford; Richard Kiley	1969	United States	
The House That Dripped Blood	"Method For Murder" "Waxworks" "Sweets to the Sweet" "The Cloak"	Peter Duffell	Denholm Elliott; Peter Cushing; Christopher Lee	1971	United Kingdom	
Asylum	"Frozen Fear" by Robert Bloch "The Weird Tailor" "Lucy Comes To Stay" "Mannequins of Horror"	Roy Ward Baker	Peter Cushing; Britt Ekland; Robert Powell	1972	United Kingdom	
Tales from the Crypt	"...And All Through the House" "Reflection of Death" "Poetic Justice" "Wish You Were Here" "Blind Alleys"	Freddie Francis	Joan Collins; Peter Cushing	1972	United Kingdom	
Encounter with the Unknown	"The Heptagon" "The Darkness" "The Girl on the Bridge"	Harry Thomason	Robert Ginnaven; Gary Brockette; John Leslie	1972	United States	
Tales That Witness Madness	"Clinic link episodes" "Mr. Tiger" "Penny Farthing" "Mel" "Luau"	Freddie Francis	Donald Pleasence; Joan Collins; Kim Novak; Jack Hawkins	1973	United Kingdom	
The Vault of Horror	"Midnight Mess" "The Neat Job" "This Trick’ll Kill You" "Bargain in Death" "Drawn and Quartered"	Roy Ward Baker	Terry Thomas; Curd Jürgens	1973	United Kingdom	
From Beyond the Grave	"The Gatecrasher" "An Act of Kindness" "The Elemental" "The Door"	Kevin Connor	Peter Cushing; Donald Pleasence; Ian Bannen	1974	United Kingdom	
Trilogy of Terror	"Julie" by Richard Matheson "Millicent and Therese" by Richard Matheson "Amelia" by Richard Matheson	Dan Curtis	Karen Black; John Karlen; Frank Welker	1975	United States	
Dead of Night	"Second Chance" by Jack Finney "No Such Thing as a Vampire" by Richard Matheson "Bobby" by Richard Matheson	Dan Curtis	Ed Begley Jr. Patrick Macnee; Lee Montgomery	1977	United States	
The Uncanny	"Montreal 1977", "London 1912", "Quebec 1975" and "Hollywood 1936" by Michel Parry	Denis Héroux	Peter Cushing; Ray Milland; Samantha Eggar; Joan Greenwood; Donald Pleasence	1977	United Kingdom; Canada	
The House of the Dead (Alien Zone)	Four stories	Sharron Miller	John Ericson; Ivor Francis; Judith Novgrod; Burr DeBenning	1978	United States	
Screams of a Winter Night	Three stories	James L. Wilson	Matt Borel; Gil Glasgow; Patrick Byers; Mary Agen Cox	1979	United States	
The Monster Club	"The Shadmock" "The Vampires" "The Ghouls"	Roy Ward Baker	Vincent Price; Donald Pleasence; John Carradine	1981	United Kingdom	
Creepshow	"Father's Day" after Stephen King "The Lonesome Death of Jordy Verrill" "Something to Tide You Over" "The Crate" "They're Creeping Up on You!"	George A. Romero	Ed Harris; Leslie Nielsen; Ted Danson; Hal Holbrook; Adrienne Barbeau	1982	United States	
Screamtime	"Killer Punch" "Dreamhouse" "Garden of Blood"	Michael Armstrong; Stanley A. Long	Jean Anderson; Robin Bailey; Dora Bryan; Ann Lynn; Ian Saynor; David Van Day	1983	United Kingdom; United States	
Twilight Zone: The Movie	"Time Out" "Kick the Can" "It's a Good Life" "Nightmare at 20,000 Feet"	John Landis; Steven Spielberg; Joe Dante; George Miller	Burgess Meredith; Kathleen Quinlan; John Lithgow	1983	United States	
The Dungeonmaster (aka Ragewar: The Challenges of Excalibrate or Digital Knights)	Seven segments	Dave Allen; Richard Band; John Carl Buechler; Steven Ford; Peter Manoogian; Ted Nicolaou; Rosemarie Turko	Jeffrey Byron; Richard Moll; Leslie Wing; Phil Fondacaro	1984	United States	
Cat's Eye	"Quitters, Inc." by Stephen King "The Ledge" "The General"	Lewis Teague	Drew Barrymore; James Woods	1985	United States	
Deadtime Stories (Freaky Fairy-Tales, The Griebels from Deadtime Stories)	Three segments	Jeffrey Delman	Scott Valentine; Nicole Picard; Matt Mitler; Cathryn de Prume; Melissa Leo	1986	United States	
Creepshow 2	"Old Chief Wood'nhead" after Stephen King "The Raft" "The Hitch-hiker"	Michael Gornick	Lois Chiles; George Kennedy; Dorothy Lamour	1987	United States	
Tales from the QuadeaD Zone	"Food for" "The Brothers" "Unseen Vision"	Chester Novell Turner	W.J. Rider; Keefe L. Turner; John W. Jones	1987	United States	
After Midnight	"The Old Dark House" "A Night on the Town" "All Night Operator"	Ken and Jim Wheat	Pamela Segall; Marc McClure	1989	United States	
Grim Prairie Tales	Four western stories	Wayne Coe	James Earl Jones; Brad Dourif; Will Hare; Marc McClure	1990	United States	
Tales from the Darkside: The Movie	"Lot 249" "Cat from Hell" "Lover's Vow"	John Harrison	Deborah Harry; Steve Buscemi; William Hickey	1990	United States	
Body Bags	"The Gas Station" "Hair" "Eye"	John Carpenter; Tobe Hooper	Stacy Keach; David Warner; Sheena Easton; Debbie Harry; Mark Hamill; Robert Carradine	1993	United States	
Twilight Zone: Rod Serling's Lost Classics	"The Theatre" - story by Rod Serling, written by Richard Matheson "Where the Dead Are" - story and teleplay by Rod Serling	Robert Markowitz	Amy Irving; Gary Cole; Jack Palance; Patrick Bergin	1994	United States	
Tales from the Hood	"Rogue Cop Revelation" "Boys Do Get Bruised" "KKK Comeuppance" "Hard-Core Convert"	Rusty Cundieff	Clarence Williams III; Rosalind Cash; Rusty Cundieff	1995	United States	
Campfire Tales	"The Hook" "The Campfire" "The Honeymoon" "People Can Lick Too" "The Locket"	Matt Cooper; Martin Kunert; David Semel	James Marsden; Christine Taylor; Amy Smart; Ron Livingston	1997	United States	
The Mirror (怪談之魔鏡; Guai tan: Mo jing)	Five unrelated segments	Siu Wing	Nicholas Tse, Ruby Lin; Law Lan	1999	Hong Kong	
Bangkok Haunted (ผีสามบาท)	"Legend of the Drum" "Black Magic Woman" "Revenge"	Pisut Praesangeam; Oxide Pang	Pimsiree Pimsee; Pramote Seangsorn; Dawan Singha-Wee; Kalyanut Sriboonrueng; Pete Thong-Jeur	2001	Thailand	
Strange Frequency	"Disco Inferno" "My Generation" "Room Service" "More Than a Feeling"	Mary Lambert; Bryan Spicer	Martin Cummins; Christopher Masterson; Brandy Ledford; Danny Masterson	2001	United States |	
Three (쓰리, อารมณ์ อาถรรพณ์ อาฆาต, 三更)	"Memories" "The Wheel" "Going Home"	Kim Jee-woon; Nonzee Nimibutr; Peter Ho-Sun Chan	Jeong Bo-seok; Kim Hye-soo; Choi Jeong-won; Suwinit Panjamawat; Kanyavae Chatiawaipreacha; Pornchai Chuvanon; Leon Lai; Eugenia Yuan; Eric Tsang	2002	South Korea; Thailand; Hong Kong	
Darna Mana Hai	"On the Way" "No Smoking" "Homework" "Apples" "Ghostly Lift" "Stop/Move"	Prawaal Raman	Saif Ali Khan; Vivek Oberoi; Nana Patekar; Boman Irani; Sanjay Kapoor; Shilpa Shetty	2003	India	
Three... Extremes	"Dumplings" "Cut" "Box"	Fruit Chan; Park Chan-wook; Takashi Miike	Bai Ling; Tony Leung Ka-fai; Lee Byung-hun	2004	Hong Kong; Japan; South Korea	
Creepshow 3	"Alice" after Stephen King "The Radio" "Call Girl" "The Professor's Wife" "Haunted Dog"	Ana Clavell; James Dudelson	Roy Abramsohn; Kris Allen; Magi Avila	2006	United States	
Darna Zaroori Hai	"Imaginary Ghost" "Spirits Do Come" "Accidents are Never Predicted" "Ghostly Audition" "A Bride's Revenge" "The Ending"	Sajid Khan; Ram Gopal Varma; Prawaal Raman; Vivek Shah; Jiji Philip; J. D. Chakravarthy; Manish Gupta	Amitabh Bachchan; Arjun Rampal; Anil Kapoor; Mallika Sherawat; Sunil Shetty	2006	India	
Hood of Horror	"Crossed Out" "The Scumlord" "Rapsody Askew"	Stacy Title	Snoop Dogg; Ernie Hudson; Danny Trejo	2006	United States	
Wag Kang Lilingon	"Uyayi" "Salamin"	Quark Henares; Jerry Lopez Sineneng	Anne Curtis; Kristine Hermosa	2006	Philippines	
Fear(s) of the Dark	Six stories	Christian "Blutch" Hincker; Charles Burns; Marie Caillou; Pierre di Sciullo; Lorenzo Mattotti; Richard McGuire	Aure Atika; Guillaume Depardieu; Louisa Pili; François Creton; Christian Hecq; Arthur H	2007	France	
4bia (Phobia 1 สี่แพร่ง)	"Loneliness" "Deadly Charm" "The Man in the Middle" "Flight 244"	Youngyooth Thongkonthun; Paween Purikitpanya; Banjong Pisanthanakun; Parkpoom Wongpoon	Maneerat Kham-uan; Apinya Sakuljaroensuk; Nattapong Chartpong; Laila Boonyasak	2008	Thailand	
Phobia 2 (ห้าแพร่ง; lit. Five-Way Intersection)	"Novice" "Ward" "Backpackers" "Salvage" "In the End"	Paween Purijitpanya; Visute Poolvoralaks; Songyos Sugmakanan; Parkpoom Wongpoom; Banjong Pisanthanakun	Jirayu Laongmanee; Worrawech Danuwong; Charlie Trairat; Nicole Theriault; Marsha Wattanapanich	2009	Thailand	
Trick 'r Treat	"Principal" "Halloween School Bus Massacre" "Surprise Party" "Sam"	Michael Dougherty	Dylan Baker, Rochelle Aytes, Anna Paquin, Brian Cox	2009	United States	
Cinco	"Braso" "Paa" "Mata" "Mukha" "Puso"	Frasco Mortiz; Enrico C. Santos; Ato Bautista; Nick Olanka; Cathy Garcia-Molina	Sam Concepcion; AJ Perez; Robi Domingo; Jodi Sta. Maria; Maja Salvador; Rayver Cruz; Mariel Rodriguez; Pokwang; Zanjoe Marudo	2010	Philippines	
Chillerama	"Wadzilla" "I Was a Teenage Werebear" "The Diary of Anne Frankenstein" "Zom-B-Movie"	Adam Rifkin; Tim Sullivan; Adam Green; Joe Lynch	Adam Rifkin; Sarah Mutch; Sean Paul Lockhart; Gabby West	2011	United States	
Grave Tales	"One Man’s Meat" "Callistro’s Mirror" "The Hand" "Dead Kittens"	Don Fearney	Brian Murphy; Damien Thomas; Edward de Souza	2011	United Kingdom	
Little Deaths	"House and Home" "Mutant Tool" "Bitch"	Sean Hogan; Andrew Parkinson; Simon Rumley	Luke de Lacey; Jodie Jameson	2011	United Kingdom	
The ABCs of Death	26 segments "A is for Apocalypse" "B is for Bigfoot" "C is for Cycle" ...	Srdjan Spasojevic; Timo Tjahjanto; Lee Hardcastle	Ingrid Bolsø Berdal; Iván González; Kyra Zagorsky; Lucy Clements	2012	United States	
Pandemonium	Three interconnected stories	Quarxx	Hugo Dillon, Arben Bajraktaraj, Ophélia Kolb	2023	France	
V/H/S	"Tape 56" "Amateur Night" "Second Honeymoon" "Tuesday the 17th" "The Sick Thing That Happened to Emily When She Was Younger" "10/31/98"	Adam Wingard; David Bruckner; Ti West; Glenn McQuaid; Joe Swanberg; Radio Silence	Lane Hughes; Hannah Fierman; Joe Swanberg; Norma C. Quinones; Helen Rogers; Chad Villella	2012	United States	
V/H/S/2	"Tape 49" "Phase I Clinical Trials" "A Ride in the Park" "Safe Haven" "Slumber Party Alien Abduction"	Simon Barrett; Adam Wingard; Eduardo Sanchez; Gregg Hale; Gareth Huw Evans; Timo Tjahjanto; Jason Eisener	Lawrence Levine; Kelsey Abbott; L.C. Holt; Adam Wingard; Hannah Al Rashid; Oka Antara	2013	United States; Canada; Indonesia	
ABCs of Death 2	26 segments "A Is for Amateur" "B Is for Badger" "C Is for Capital Punishment" ...	Jim Hosking; Lancelot Oduwa Imasuen; Julian Barrett; Rodney Ascher; Kristina Buožytė; Larry Fessenden; Aharon Keshales; Bill Plympton; Vincenzo Nata etc.	Andy Nyman; Béatrice Dalle; Laurence R. Harvey etc.	2014	United States	
V/H/S: Viral	"Vicious Circles" "Dante the Great" "Parallel Monsters" "Bonestorm" "Gorgeous Vortex"	Marcel Sarmiento; Gregg Bishop; Nacho Vigalondo; Justin Benson; Aaron Moorhead; Todd Lincoln	Patrick Lawrie; Emilia Ares; Justin Welborn; Emmy Argo; Gustavo Salmeron	2014	United States; Spain	
A Christmas Horror Story	Four segments	Grant Harvey; Steven Hoban; Brett Sullivan	William Shatner; George Buza; Rob Archer	2015	Canada	
Volumes of Blood	"Ghastly" "13 After Midnight" "The Encyclopedia Satanica" "A Little Pick Me Up" "That's a Wrap!"	P.J. Starks; Jakob Bilinski; Nathan Thomas Milliner; John Kenneth Muir; Lee Vervoort	Kristine Renee Farley; Jason Crowe; Jim O'Rear; Roni Jonah	2015	United States	
Southbound	"The Way Out" "Siren" "The Accident" "Jailbreak" "The Way In"	Radio Silence; Roxanne Benjamin; David Bruckner; Patrick Horvath		2015	United States	
Tales of Halloween	"Sweet Tooth" "The Night Billy Raised Hell" "Trick" "The Weak and the Wicked" "Grim Grinning Ghost" "Ding Dong" "This Means War" "Friday the 31st" "The Ransom of Rusty Rex" "Bad Seed"	Dave Parker; Darren Lynn Bousman; Adam Gierasch; Paul Solet; Axelle Carolyn; Lucky McKee; Andrew Kasch and John Skipp; Mike Mendez; Ryan Schifrin; Neil Marshall	Grace Phipps; Booboo Stewart; Adrienne Barbeau; Lin Shaye; Barry Bostwick; Sam Witwer; Greg Grunberg; John Landis; Joe Dante; Barbara Crampton; Pollyanna McIntosh; James Duval; Pat Healy; Adam Green; Alex Essoe; Stuart Gordon; Mick Garris; Marc Senter; Kristina Klebe; Keir Gilchrist; Clare Kramer; Jose Pablo Cantillo; John Savage; Caroline Williams	2015	United States	
ABCs of Death 2.5	26 segments "M Is for Magnetic Tape" "M Is for Maieusiophobia" ...	Tim Rutherford; Christopher Younes; Gigi Saul Guerrero; Carles Torrens	diverși actori	2016	United States	
Holidays	"Valentine's Day" "St. Patrick's Day" "Easter" "Mother's Day" "Father's Day" "Halloween" "Christmas" "New Year's Day"	Kevin Kölsch and Dennis Widmyer; Gary Shore; Nichola McCarthy; Sarah Adina Smith; Anthony Scott Burns; Kevin Smith; Scott Stewart; Adam Egypt Mortimer		2016	United States	
Patient Seven	"The Body" "Undying Love" "The Sleeping Plot" "Death Scenes" "Evaded" "The Visitant" "Banishing"	Danny Draven; Paul Davis; Ómar Örn Hauksson; Dean Hewison; Joel Morgan; Johannes Persson	Michael Ironside; Jack Plotnick; Drew Fonteiro	2017	United States	
Galaxy of Horrors	"Eden" "Iris" "Flesh Computer" "Pathos" "Eveless" "They Will All Die in Space" "Entity" "Kingz"	Dennis Cabella; Todd Cobery; Javier Chillon etc.	Adam Buller; Charles Hubbell; Rob Kerkovich; Dennis Cabella	2017	Canada	
XX	"The Box" "The Birthday Party" "Don't Fall" "Her Only Living Son"	Jovanka Vuckovic; Annie Clark; Roxanne Benjamin; Karyn Kusama		2017	United States	
Nightmare Cinema	"The Thing in the Woods" "Mirari "Mashit" "This Way to Egress" "Dead"	Alejandro Burgués; Joe Dante; Ryuhei Kitamura; David Slade; Mick Garris	Mickey Rourke; Patrick Wilson; Richard Chamberlain; Annabeth Gish	2018	United States	
An Hour to Kill	"An Hour to Kill" "Valkyrie's Bunker" "Assacre"	Aaron K. Carter	Mel Novak; Aaron Guerrero; Frankie Pozos	2018	United States	
The Mortuary Collection	"Frame story, part 1" "Segment 1" "Segment 2: Unprotected" "Segment 3: Till Death" "Frame story, part 2" "Segment 4: The Babysitter Murders" "Frame story, part 3"	Ryan Spindell	Clancy Brown; Caitlin Custer; Christine Kilmer; Jacob Elordi; Ema Horvath; Barak Hardley; Sarah Hay	2019	United States	
Shake, Rattle & Roll	"Baso" "Pridyider" "Manananggal"	Emmanuel Borlaza; Ishmael Bernal; Peque Gallaga	Herbert Bautista; Charito Solis; William Martinez; Janice de Belen; Rey "PJ" Abellana; Joel Torre; Irma Alegre; Emily Loren; Arlene Muhlach; Mon Alvir; Peewee Quijano; Lito Gruet	1984	Philippines	
Shake, Rattle & Roll II	"Multo" "Kulam" "Aswang"	Peque Gallaga; Lore Reyes	Manilyn Reynes; Janice de Belen; Eric Quizon; Eddie Gutierrez; Isabel Granada; Caridad Sanchez; Joey Marquez; Carmina Villarroel; Daisy Romualdez; Sylvia Sanchez; Aljon Jimenez; Ana Roces; Anjo Yllana; Rez Cortez	1990	Philippines	
Shake, Rattle & Roll III	"Yaya" "Ate" "Nanay"	Peque Gallaga; Lore Reyes	Kris Aquino; Ogie Alcasid; Rosemarie Gil; Manilyn Reynes; Joey Marquez; Ai-Ai delas Alas; Janice de Belen; Gina Alajar; Joel Torre; Armida Siguion-Reyna; Subas Herrero; Inday Badiday	1991	Philippines	
Shake, Rattle & Roll IV	"Guro" "Kapitbahay" "Madre"	Peque Gallaga; Lore Reyes	Janice de Belen; Manilyn Reynes; Aiko Melendez; Edu Manzano; Miguel Rodriguez; Al Tantay; Aljon Jimenez; Nida Blanca; Gina Alajar; Aiza Seguerra; IC Mendoza	1992	Philippines	
Shake, Rattle & Roll V	"Maligno" "Anino" "Impakto"	Don Escudero; Jose Javier Reyes; Manny Castañeda	Sheryl Cruz; Manilyn Reynes; Ruffa Gutierrez; Chuck Perez; Monsour del Rosario; Tom Taus, Jr. Jaclyn Jose	1994	Philippines	
Shake, Rattle & Roll VI	"Telebisyon" "Tulay" "Buwan"	Maurice Carvajal; Frank G. Rivera; Anton Juan	Tonton Gutierrez; John Apacible; Raymond Keannu; Daniel Pacia; Joanne Quintas; Georgia Ortega; Ara Mina; Aiza Seguerra; Matet de Leon; Tom Taus, Jr. Camille Prats	1997	Philippines	
Shake, Rattle & Roll 2k5	"Poso" "Aquarium" "Lihim ng San Joaquin"	Uro Q. dela Cruz; Rico Maria Ilarde; Richard Somes	Ai-Ai delas Alas; Gloria Romero; Yasmien Kurdi; Rainier Castillo; Marco Alcaraz; Biboy Ramirez; Jenine Desiderio; Ara Mina; Ogie Alcasid; Wilma Doesnt; Reggie Curley; Paul Salas; Mark Anthony Fernandez; Tanya Garcia; Elizabeth Oropesa; Nonie Buencamino; Ronnie Lazaro	2005	Philippines	
Shake, Rattle and Roll 8	"13th Floor" "Yaya" "LRT"	Rahyan Q. Carlos; Topel Lee; Michael Tuviera	Sheryl Cruz; Manilyn Reynes; Keempee de Leon; Iza Calzado; Bearwin Meily; TJ Trinidad; Eugene Domingo; Keanna Reeves; Roxanne Guinoo; Joseph Bitangcol; Miko Palanca	2006	Philippines	
Shake, Rattle and Roll 9	"Christmas Tree" "Bangungot" "Engkanto"	Paul Y. Daza; Michael Tuviera; Topel Lee	John Prats; Pauleen Luna; Katrina Halili; Roxanne Guinoo; Lovi Poe; Matt Evans; Melissa Ricks; Mart Escudero; Jewel Mische; Felix Roco; Nash Aguas; Sam Concepcion; Eugene Domingo; Dennis Trillo	2007	Philippines	
Shake, Rattle & Roll X	"Emergency" "Class Picture" "Nieves"	Michael Tuviera; Topel Lee	Marian Rivera; Roxanne Guinoo; JC De Vera; Kim Chiu; Gerald Anderson; Jean Garcia; Wendell Ramos; Mylene Dizon; Diana Zubiri	2008	Philippines	
Shake, Rattle & Roll XI	"Diablo" "Ukay-Ukay" "Lamanglupa"	Rico Gutierrez; Don Michael Perez; Jessel Monteverde	Ruffa Gutierrez; Mark Anthony Fernandez; Maja Salvador; Rayver Cruz; Zoren Legaspi; Iya Villania; Jennica Garcia; Mart Escudero	2009	Philippines	
Shake, Rattle and Roll 12	"Mamanyiika" "Isla" "Punerarya"	Zoren Legaspi; Topel Lee; Jerrold Tarog	Carla Abellana; Shaina Magdayao; Andi Eigenmann; Rayver Cruz; Sid Lucero; Ricky Davao; Jackie Lou Blanco; Regine Angeles; Martin Escudero; Nash Aguas; Elijah Alejo; Anna Vicente; John Lapus; Rita Avila; Malou Crisologo; Kristel Moreno; Niña Jose; John Feir; Gaby dela Merced	2010	Philippines	
Shake, Rattle & Roll 13	"Tamawo" "Parola" "Rain, Rain, Go Away"	Richard V. Somes; Jerrold Tarog; Chris Martinez	Eugene Domingo; Zanjoe Marudo; Maricar Reyes; Kathryn Bernardo; Sam Concepcion; Edgar Allan Guzman; Louise delos Reyes; Celia Rodriguez; Boots Anson-Roa; Jay Manalo; Ara Mina; Dimples Romana; Ervic Vijandre	2011	Philippines	
Shake, Rattle and Roll Fourteen: The Invasion	"Pamana" "Lost Command" "Unwanted"	Chito S. Roño	Vhong Navarro; Janice de Belen; Herbert Bautista; Dennis Trillo; Lovi Poe; Paulo Avelino; Martin Escudero	2012	Philippines	
Shake, Rattle & Roll XV	"Ahas" "Ulam" "Flight 666"	Dondon S. Santos; Jerrold Tarog; Perci Intalan	Erich Gonzales; JC de Vera; Dennis Trillo; Carla Abellana; Lovi Poe; Matteo Guidicelli; John Lapus	2014	Philippines	
Shake, Rattle & Roll Extreme	"Glitch" "Mukbang" "Rage"	Richard V. Somes; Jerrold Tarog; Joey de Guzman	Iza Calzado; Jane de Leon; Jane Oineza; RK Bagatsing; Paul Salas; Miggs Cuaderno; Rob Gomez; AC Bonifacio; Donna Cariaga; Ninong Ry; Angel Guardian; Elle Villanueva; Sarah Edwards	2023	Philippines	
Shake, Rattle & Roll: Evil Origins	"1775" "2025" "2050"	Shugo Praico; Joey de Guzman; Ian Loreños	Richard Gutierrez; Carla Abellana; Ivana Alawi; Loisa Andalio; Francine Diaz; Seth Fedelin; Ysabel Ortega; Ashley Ortega; Dustin Yu; Fyang Smith; JM Ibarra; Manilyn Reynes; Janice de Belen	2025	Philippines	
Ghost Stories	Four segments	Karan Johar; Dibakar Banerjee; Zoya Akhtar; Anurag Kashyap	Sobhita Dhulipala; Mrunal Thakur; Avinash Tiwary; Janhvi Kapoor	2020	India	
An Horror Anthology	Four segments	Chris Rakotomamonjy	Anne Terret; André Chomier; Mehdi Sersoub	2020	France	
Scare Package	"Rad Chad's Horror Emporium, Horror Hypothesis" "Cold Open" "One Time in the Woods" "M.I.S.T.E.R." "Girls Night Out of Body" "The Night He Came Back Again! Part IV: The Final Kill" "So Much to Do"	Courtney Andujar; Hillary Andujar; Anthony Cousins; Emily Hagins; Aaron B. Koontz; Chris McInroy; Noah Segan; Baron Vaughn	Jon Michael Simpson; Luxy Banner; Sydney Huddleston	2020	United States	
V/H/S/94	"Holy Hell" "Storm Drain" "The Empty Wake" "The Subject" "Terror"	Jennifer Reeder; Chloe Okuno; Simon Barrett; Timo Tjahjanto; Ryan Prows		2021	United States	
Dr. Saville's Horror Show	"Consume" "It's Complicated" "Break"	Kevin R. Phipps	Allen Valor; Michael Hanelin; Kristina Sabbagh; Jedediah Jones; Honda King; Bry Lys; Kirk Levingar; Harley Queen; Dylan Crow	2022	United States	
KillRoy Was Here		Kevin Smith	Azita Ghanizada; Ryan O'Nan; Harley Quinn Smith; Chris Jericho; Justin Kucsulain	2022	United States	
V/H/S/99	"Shredding" "Suicide Bid" "Ozzy's Dungeon" "The Gawkers" "To Hell and Back"	Johannes Roberts; Vanessa & Joseph Winter; Maggie Levin; Tyler MacIntyre; Flying Lotus		2022	United States	
Guillermo del Toro's Cabinet of Curiosities	"Lot 36" "Graveyard Rats" "The Autopsy" "The Outside" "Pickman's Model" "Dreams in the Witch House" "The Viewing" "The Murmuring"	Guillermo Navarro; Vincenzo Natali; David Prior; Ana Lily Amirpour; Keith Thomas; Catherine Hardwicke; Panos Cosmatos; Jennifer Kent		2022	United States Mexico	
V/H/S/85	"Total Copy" "No Wake" "God of Death" "TKNOGD" "Ambrosia" "Dreamkill"	David Bruckner; Mike P. Nelson; Gigi Saul Guerrero; Natasha Kermani; Scott Derrickson		2023	United States	
V/H/S/Beyond	"Stork" "Fur Babies" "Live and Let Dive" "Dream Girl" "Stowaway" "A Special Presentation"	Jordan Downey; Christian Long and Justin Long; Justin Martinez; Virat Pal; Kate Siegel; Jay Cheel		2024	United States	
V/H/S/Halloween		Bryan M. Ferguson; Casper Kelly; Micheline Pitt-Norman & R.H. Norman; Alex Ross Perry; Paco Plaza; Anna Zlokovic		2025	United States	

== See also ==
- Lists of horror films
- Horror Noire (film)
