= Matt Peters =

American actor

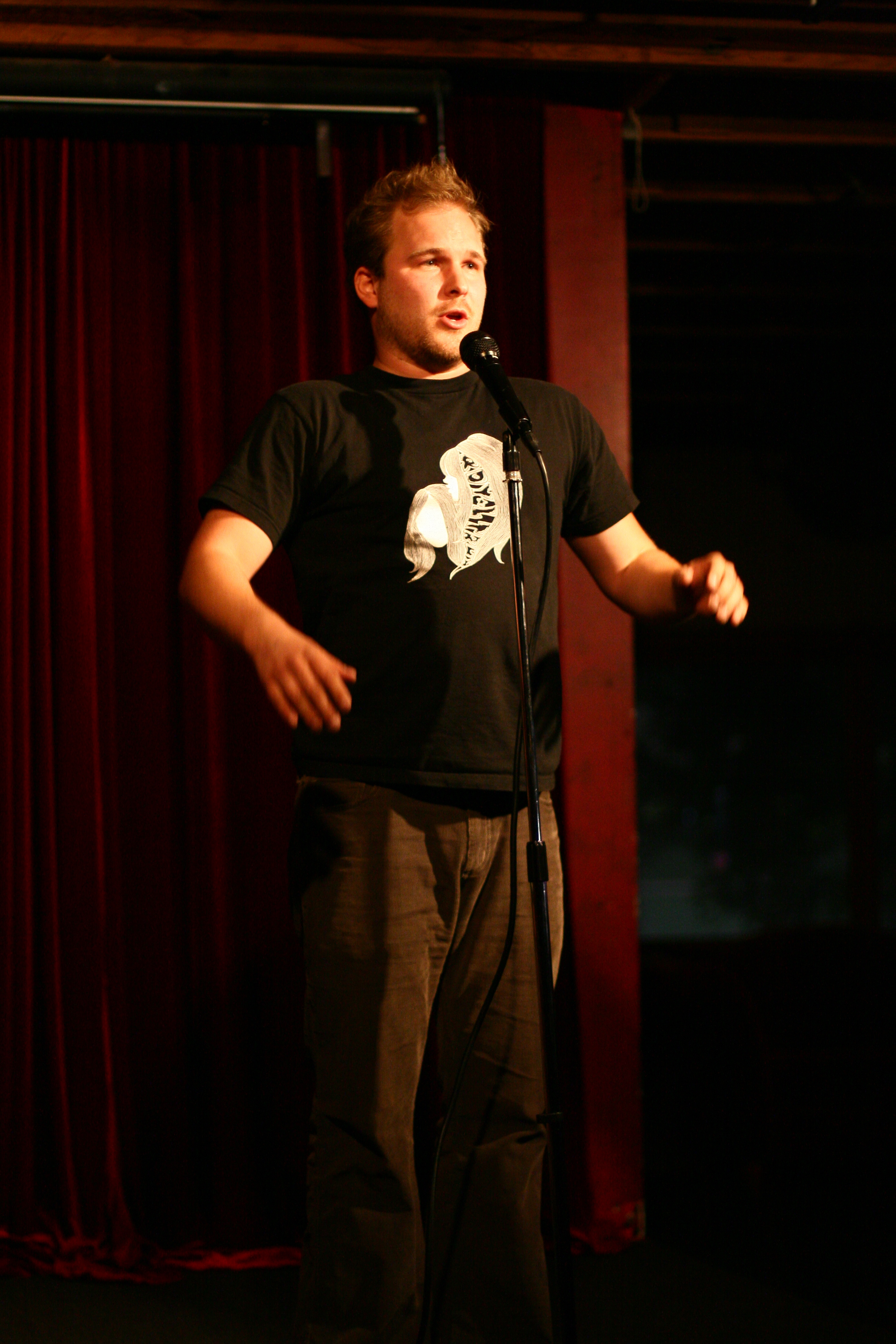
- Peters in 2007
- Occupation: Actor
- Years active: 2003–present
- Spouse: Susan Theresa Burke (m. 2012)
- Children: 1

Matt Peters is an American actor, known for his role as Joel Luschek in the Netflix comedy-drama series, Orange Is the New Black.

== Life and career ==
Peters began performing as a stand-up comedian in Los Angeles and appeared in a number of short films and web-series, before was cast in a recurring role on the Showtime comedy series, Weeds, created by Jenji Kohan in 2009. In 2013, Kohan cast Peters as Joel Luschek in her Netflix comedy-drama series, Orange Is the New Black. He was a recurring cast member during the first five seasons, before being promoted to regular for seasons six and seven. Along with the cast, he received two Screen Actors Guild Awards for Outstanding Performance by an Ensemble in a Comedy Series.

In 2015, Peters made his film debut appearing in the horror-anthology, Southbound. He later appeared in the films Slash (2016), Body at Brighton Rock (2019) and Bobcat Moretti (2022). In 2019, he had a recurring role in Kohan's comedy-drama series, American Princess for Lifetime. He guest-starred on Superstore, The Goldbergs and NCIS: Los Angeles.

== Filmography ==
=== Films ===
List of film credits
Year	Title	Role	Notes
2015	Southbound	Al	
2016	Slash	Mr. Ford	
2019	Body at Brighton Rock	Kevin	
2022	Bobcat Moretti	Charlie Moretti	
2024	ClearMind	David	
2024	Winterset	Cooper Langley	Post-production

=== Television ===
List of television appearances
Year	Title	Role	Notes
2009	IKEA Heights	The Chief	7 episodes
2009–2011	Weeds	Gayle	4 episodes
2013–2019	Orange Is the New Black	Joel Luschek	64 episodes Screen Actors Guild Award for Outstanding Performance by an Ensemble in a Comedy Series (2016–2017); Nominated — Screen Actors Guild Award for Outstanding Performance by an Ensemble in a Comedy Series (2018)
2016	The 4th	Convenience Store Clerk	
2016	Hidden America with Jonah Ray	Glen	Episode: "San Francisco: Where Culture Is Countered"
2016	Rush Hour	Joel Schmertz	Episode: "Knock, Knock... House Creeping!"
2018	Superstore	Hank	Episode: "Target"
2019	American Princess	Shart O'Belly	9 episodes
2020	The Goldbergs	Gus Van Noy	Episode: "Geoff the Pleaser"
2020	Teenage Bounty Hunters	Deacon Wesley	Episode: "Cleave or Whatever"
2020	Let's Be Real	James Corden	Voice
2020	NCIS: Los Angeles	FBI Agent Michael Rudolph	Episode: "Raising the Dead"
2022	Animal Kingdom	Paparazzo	Episodes: "Covet" and "Diamonds Are Forever"
2022	Out of Office	Hammer	TV film
2025	Landman	Mel	Upcoming series
2025	The Paper	Gary	Guest Star; Season 1, Episode 2 "The Five W's"
