= Body at Brighton Rock =

- Theatrical release poster
- Directed by: Roxanne Benjamin
- Written by: Roxanne Benjamin
- Produced by: Roxanne Benjamin; Christopher Alender
- Starring: Karina Fontes; Casey Adams; Emily Althaus; Miranda Bailey; Martin Spanjers; Matt Peters; Susan Burke; John Getz
- Cinematography: Hannah Getz
- Edited by: Courtney Marcilliat; Matt Blundell
- Music by: The Gifted
- Production companies: SoapBox Films; ProtoStar Pictures
- Distributed by: Magnet Releasing
- Release dates: March 8, 2019 (SXSW); April 26, 2019 (United States)
- Running time: 87 minutes
- Country: United States
- Language: English
- Budget: $500k
- Box office: $5,123

Body at Brighton Rock is a 2019 American horror thriller film, directed, written, and produced by Roxanne Benjamin. It stars Karina Fontes, Casey Adams, Emily Althaus, Miranda Bailey, Martin Spanjers, Matt Peters, Susan Burke and John Getz.

It had its world premiere at South by Southwest on March 8, 2019 and was released on April 26, 2019, by Magnet Pictures. The film received mixed reviews from critics.

== Premise ==
Wendy, a part-time summer employee at a mountainous state park, takes on a rough trail assignment at the end of the season, trying to prove to her friends that she's capable enough to do the job. When she takes a wrong turn and ends up deep in the backcountry, she stumbles upon a potential crime scene. Stuck with no communication after losing her radio and with orders to guard the site, Wendy must fight the urge to run.

== Cast ==
- Karina Fontes as Wendy
- Casey Adams as Red
- Emily Althaus as Maya
- Miranda Bailey as Sandra
- Martin Spanjers as Davey
- Matt Peters as Kevin
- Susan Burke as Coroner
- John Getz as Sheriff
- Brodie Reed as Craig
- John Beach as Chip

== Production ==
Filming took place over ten days in December 2017, with an additional two days in February 2018, in Idylwild, California.

== Release ==
In January 2018, Magnet Releasing acquired distribution rights to the film. It had its world premiere at South by Southwest on March 8, 2019. It was released on April 26, 2019.

== Critical reception ==
On review aggregator Rotten Tomatoes, 60% of 43 critics gave the film a positive review, with an average rating of 5.8/10. The website's critics consensus reads, "Body at Brighton Rock leaves some of its thrilling potential untapped, but the end result remains a solidly crafted outing that should entertain horror fans." On Metacritic, the film has a weighted average score of 53 out of 100, based on 11 critics, indicating "mixed or average" reviews.
