= NCIS: Los Angeles season 12 =

NCIS: Los Angeles
- Season 12
- Season 12 U.S. DVD cover
- Starring: Chris O'Donnell; Daniela Ruah; Eric Christian Olsen; Barrett Foa; Renée Felice Smith; Medalion Rahimi; Caleb Castille; Linda Hunt; LL Cool J
- No. of episodes: 18

Release
- Original network: CBS
- Original release: November 8, 2020 – May 23, 2021

Season chronology
- ← Previous; Season 11 Next → Season 13

The twelfth season of NCIS: Los Angeles, an American police procedural drama television series, began airing on CBS on November 8, 2020, and ended on May 23, 2021. The season included 18 episodes. This is the first season to feature Caleb Castille as Devin Roundtree and the final season to feature Linda Hunt, Barrett Foa, and Renée Felice Smith as series regulars.

== Cast and characters ==
=== Main ===
- Chris O'Donnell as Grisha "G." Callen, NCIS Supervisory Special Agent (SSA) and Special Agent-in-Charge (SAC) of the Team
- LL Cool J as Sam Hanna, NCIS Senior Field Agent, Second in Command
- Daniela Ruah as Kensi Blye, NCIS Special Agent
- Eric Christian Olsen as Marty Deeks, NCIS Investigator (Previously LAPD/NCIS Liaison Officer)
- Barrett Foa as Eric Beale, NCIS Senior Technical Operator
- Renée Felice Smith as Nell Jones, NCIS Special Agent and Intelligence Analyst & Acting Operations Manager
- Medalion Rahimi as Fatima Namazi, NCIS Special Agent
- Caleb Castille as Devin Roundtree, NCIS Special Agent (Previously FBI Agent)
- Linda Hunt as Henrietta Lange, NCIS Supervisory Special Agent (SSA) and Operations Manager

=== Recurring ===
- Bar Paly as Anastasia "Anna" Kolcheck, former ATF Agent, Callen's girlfriend
- Vyto Ruginis as Arkady Kolcheck
- Ravil Isyanov as Anatoli Kirkin
- Gerald McRaney as Hollace Kilbride, Retired Navy Admiral
- Elizabeth Bogush as Joelle Taylor, CIA Agent
- Nicki Micheaux as Effie Carlson, Special Agent

=== Notable guest stars ===
- Mariela Garriga as Pietra Rey

== Episodes ==
No. overall	No. in season	Title	Directed by	Written by	Original release date	Prod. code	U.S. viewers (millions)
263	1	"The Bear"	Dennis Smith	R. Scott Gemmill	November 8, 2020	1203	6.35
When a Russian bomber goes missing while flying over U.S. soil, Callen and Sam must track it down in the desert and secure its weapons and intel before the Russians on board destroy the plane. Also, Nell returns to OSP following her mother's death after Hetty asks her to fill in while she is away. While there, Nell learns that FBI Agent Roundtree has officially joined the OSP team, and that Eric's technology work has resulted in him being away from OSP.
264	2	"War Crimes"	Yangzom Brauen	Jordana Lewis Jaffe	November 15, 2020	1202	6.10
As the trial begins of Chief Petty Officer Thomas Argento, the SEAL whom Callen, Sam, and Roundtree arrested for war crimes last season, the NCIS team is called to help find the missing star witness.
265	3	"Angry Karen"	Dennis Smith	R. Scott Gemmill	November 22, 2020	1201	6.11
When Nell sends Sam to meet an informant who plans to blow the whistle on a military secret, Hanna's life is endangered when the man tries to run him down and kill him.
266	4	"Cash Flow"	Yangzom Brauen	Kyle Harimoto	December 6, 2020	1204	4.56
The body of a murdered navy reservist is found by thieves in the midst of a robbery, and NCIS must work with the burglars to find the killer.
267	5	"Raising the Dead"	Terrence O'Hara	Frank Military	December 6, 2020	1205	3.86
In order to get critical intel on a matter of National Security, Kensi must come face to face with David Kessler (Frank Military), a sociopath who has been obsessed with her since she put him in jail years ago. Deeks is desperate to keep Kensi safe, but he must leave NCIS after his liaison position is abolished by LAPD amidst major department realignments. Ultimately, Kessler is released from prison via a Presidential Executive Order, leaving Kensi a major target.
268	6	"If the Fates Allow"	Dan Liu	Andrew Bartels	December 13, 2020	1206	6.04
Before Christmas, Hetty assigns Callen the case of his former foster brother and his wife who, upon reentry into the U.S., are framed for smuggling drugs across the border in her oxygen tanks. Eric returns to OSP to assist with the case, though his increased eccentricity leaves his former coworkers amused. Meanwhile, as Deeks attempts to become an NCIS Agent in the wake of his liaison position being terminated, he is informed by Hetty of his acceptance to FLETC.
269	7	"Overdue"	Terrence O'Hara	Chad Mazero	January 3, 2021	1207	5.73
The NCIS team's murder investigation of a man who sold military information leads to the abduction of a doctor whose cutting edge neurotechnology could be developed into advanced weaponry. Team members are interviewed by FLETC to see if Deeks would make a good NCIS agent. Callen tries to have an important talk with Arkady regarding his future with Anna.
270	8	"Love Kills"	Dan Liu	R. Scott Gemmill	January 10, 2021	1208	5.89
When NCIS investigates the murder of a man about to reveal the source of a massive counterfeiting operation, an old acquaintance becomes their prime suspect and reveals the true reason for her return. Deeks struggles at FLETC during training to become an official NCIS agent.
271	9	"A Fait Accompli"	Eric A. Pot	Matt Klafter & Kyle Harimoto	January 17, 2021	1209	5.57
While NCIS must track down an organized crime leader who is trying to buy stolen defense technology, Callen goes to Anna to ask the ultimate question, only to be met with a shocking revelation. Deeks is kicked out of NCIS training only to find Hetty has a life-changing surprise for him - he has been made an NCIS investigator.
272	10	"The Frogman's Daughter"	Tawnia McKiernan	Indira Gibson Wilson & Jordana Lewis Jaffee	February 14, 2021	1210	6.15
When Sam's daughter Kam is abducted after leading citywide protests, the NCIS team rushes to prevent another family tragedy in Hanna's life from occurring.
273	11	"Russia, Russia, Russia"	Daniela Ruah	R. Scott Gemmill	February 21, 2021	1211	5.92
When Callen goes to the National Counterterroism Center on the pretext of interrogating a Russian asset from the crashed plane case he investigated months earlier, the tables are turned and he is detained, accused of being a Russian agent.
274	12	"Can't Take My Eyes Off You"	Tawnia McKiernan	Lee A. Carlisle	February 28, 2021	1212	5.83
After Callen receives a cryptic message from Hetty, he tracks down the person trailing him, bringing him to a remote location teeming with Russians…and face to face with Anna.
275	13	"Red Rover, Red Rover"	Terrence O'Hara	Andrew Bartels	March 28, 2021	1213	5.57
To rescue Joelle from further torture by the Russians, Callen and NCIS must offer up Anna as bait to Katya. Callen finally discovers who accused him of being a Russian spy.
276	14	"The Noble Maidens"	James Hanlon	Chad Mazero & R. Scott Gemmill	April 4, 2021	1214	5.55
After Anna is kidnapped, Callen and the team must race to save her before she is shipped back to Russia. Nell is offered an opportunity by Admiral Kilbride. Kirkin is killed in a gun shoot.
277	15	"Imposter Syndrome"	Eric A. Pot	Samantha Chasse	May 2, 2021	1215	5.61
NCIS obtains a hard drive containing a realistic deep fake video of a deceased terrorist and must retrieve the dangerous technology behind it. However, when the team's communications are hijacked during their mission, they find that several of their own has become a victim of its potential.
278	16	"Signs of Change"	Dennis Smith	Indira Gibson Wilson & Jordana Lewis Jaffee	May 9, 2021	1216	5.60
When military-grade technology is stolen, a deaf engineer who always wanted to serve her country, and the only member of her team to survive the theft, helps Kensi and NCIS track down the tech before it's taken out of the country.
279	17	"Through the Looking Glass"	Frank Military	Frank Military	May 16, 2021	1217	5.85
When a Naval Intelligence Officer is tortured and murdered, NCIS must work with Joelle who informs them that other CIA operatives are being killed in the same way while Kensi receives a threatening postcard from David Kessler, the sociopath who is obsessed with her.
280	18	"A Tale of Two Igors"	John Peter Kousakis	Kyle Harimoto & R. Scott Gemmill	May 23, 2021	1218	6.18
Deeks is kidnapped by an associate of Kirkin's in need of his help and NCIS investigates the shooting of a militarized dolphin equipped with a Russian microchip. Nell faces a crossroads when she is given two choices: officially return to NCIS or accept an offer from Eric to work with him at his tech company. Ultimately, she decides to work with Eric, saying an emotional goodbye to Hetty, who has returned to Los Angeles under mysterious circumstances.

== Production ==
=== Development and filming ===
On May 6, 2020, CBS renewed the series for a twelfth season, which premiered on November 8, 2020. Production for the twelfth season began on September 23, 2020 with full safety protocols in place amid the COVID-19 pandemic.

=== Casting ===
Caleb Castille was promoted to series regular after recurring in season eleven.

== Reception ==
=== Ratings ===
Viewership and ratings per episode of NCIS: Los Angeles season 12
No.	Title	Air date	Rating (18–49)	Viewers (millions)	DVR (18–49)	DVR viewers (millions)	Total (18–49)	Total viewers (millions)
1	"The Bear"	November 8, 2020	0.8	6.35	0.4	2.32	1.2	8.67
2	"War Crimes"	November 15, 2020	0.6	6.10	0.2	1.80	0.8	7.91
3	"Angry Karen"	November 22, 2020	0.6	6.11	—N/a	—N/a	—N/a	—N/a
4	"Cash Flow"	December 6, 2020	0.5	4.56	0.25	1.97	0.74	6.53
5	"Raising the Dead"	December 6, 2020	0.4	3.86	0.3	2.30	0.7	6.16
6	"If the Fates Allow"	December 13, 2020	0.6	6.04	0.9	3.17	—N/a	—N/a
7	"Overdue"	January 3, 2021	0.6	5.73	—N/a	—N/a	—N/a	—N/a
8	"Love Kills"	January 10, 2021	0.7	5.89	0.3	2.05	1.0	7.94
9	"A Fait Accompli"	January 17, 2021	0.6	5.57	0.3	2.10	0.9	7.67
10	"The Frogman's Daughter"	February 14, 2021	0.7	6.15	—N/a	—N/a	—N/a	—N/a
11	"Russia, Russia, Russia"	February 21, 2021	0.6	5.92	—N/a	—N/a	—N/a	—N/a
12	"Can't Take My Eyes Off You"	February 28, 2021	0.5	5.83	—N/a	—N/a	—N/a	—N/a
13	"Red Rover, Red Rover"	March 28, 2021	0.6	5.57	0.9	—N/a	—N/a	—N/a
14	"The Noble Maidens"	April 4, 2021	0.5	5.55	—N/a	—N/a	—N/a	—N/a
15	"Imposter Syndrome"	May 2, 2021	0.6	5.61	—N/a	—N/a	—N/a	—N/a
16	"Signs of Change"	May 9, 2021	0.6	5.60	0.3	2.02	0.9	7.62
17	"Through the Looking Glass"	May 16, 2021	0.6	5.85	0.3	1.81	0.9	7.66
18	"A Tale of Two Igors"	May 23, 2021	0.6	6.18	0.2	1.86	0.9	8.03

== Home media ==
NCIS: Los Angeles: The Twelfth Season
Set details	Special features	
5 discs; 18 episodes; Subtitled, NTSC		
DVD release dates
Region 1	Region 2	Region 4
August 24, 2021		N/A
