= Michael Anthony (actor) =

American actor and musician

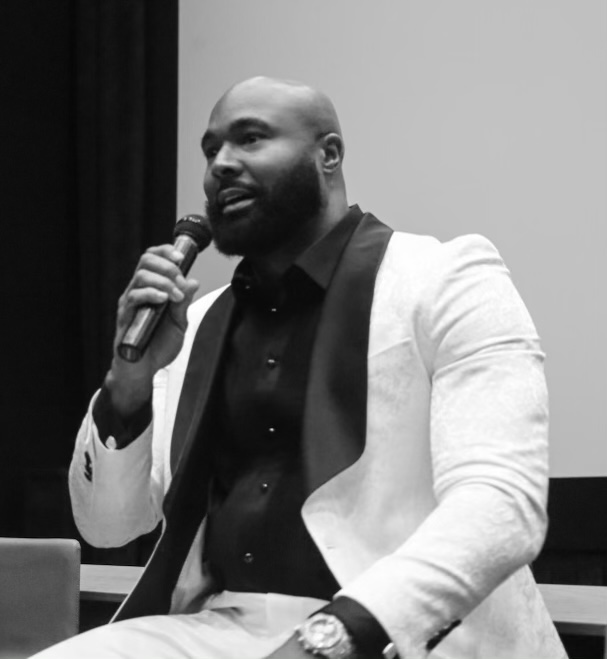
- Born: Michael Gould, Jr. Akron, Ohio
- Occupations: Actor; Singer-songwriter

Michael Anthony (born Michael Gould, Jr.), also known by the stage name Mike Bless, is an American actor, singer-songwriter, and former serviceman in the United States Air Force. He is known for appearing in TV series such as Raising Dion, Chicago Med, Big 50 – The Delronda Hood Story, and Ready to Love.

== Early life ==
Anthony was born in Akron, Ohio and was raised in Akron and Buffalo, New York. He eventually joined the military, achieving a rank of E-4/SRA in the U.S. Air Force. He was in U.S. Air Force Security Forces during Operation Enduring Freedom.

== Career ==
In 2008, Anthony entered Slip-n-Slide Records' "The Next Big Superstar" competition. He won the competition and was signed to a record deal under the stage name Mike Bless. As Mike Bless, he released the singles "Do It Like This" in 2009 and "Gone" in 2011. He also released a mixtape titled Mr. Make It Happen in 2009.

Anthony began acting after doing production work on a film soundtrack. After meeting him, the film's director suggested him to audition for a role in the movie, which he was then cast in.

Anthony was one of the contestants in the first season of OWN's reality television series Ready to Love, which premiered in 2018.

In 2020, Anthony guest-starred in the Netflix series Kings of Jo'burg, which was created and produced by Shona Ferguson. Anthony was also cast in a lead role in the short film She Had to Ask, which premiered on Allblk in the same year.

Anthony was cast as Ricky in the BET+ original film Big 50 – The Delronda Hood Story, which premiered in 2021. Anthony was also cast in a recurring role as Gary Stafford in Raising Dion.

Other television series that Anthony has appeared in include Chicago Med, Greenleaf, Dynasty, MacGyver, Black Lightning, and The Outsider.

== Filmography ==
=== Film ===
| Year | Title | Role | Notes |
|---|---|---|---|
| 2018 | Trunk | Mr. Bleep | Short |
| 2019 | Cold Feet at Christmas | 1st Wedding Hall Guest | TV movie |
| 2019 | Dear Santa, I Need a Date | Fred | TV movie |
| 2020 | False Advertisement | Mike | |
| 2020 | She Had to Ask | Graham | Short |
| 2021 | Lust: A Seven Deadly Sins Story | Magic | TV movie |
| 2021 | Big 50 – The Delronda Hood Story | Ricky | |
| 2021 | Dating Hell | Josh | |
| 2022 | MAMILs | Gerald | Short |
| 2022 | Secret Headquarters | Wisconsin | |
| 2022 | End of the Road | Jake | |
| 2022 | The Sound of Christmas | Rio | |
| 2022 | Strange Love | Chip | |
| 2022 | Grief | - | Short |

=== Television ===
| Year | Title | Role | Notes |
|---|---|---|---|
| 2010 | Buffy the Vampire Slayer Season Eight | Robin Wood (voice) | Episode: "No Future for You: Part 1" |
| 2019 | Greenleaf | Prison Guard | Episode: "Did I Lose You?" |
| 2019 | Bluff City Law | FCI Guard | Episode: "Pilot" |
| 2019 | Black Lightning | Stone Killer | Episode: "The Book of Occupation: Chapter Two: Maryam's Tasbih" |
| 2019 | Tell Me a Story | Malcolm | Episode: "Number One Fan" |
| 2020 | The Outsider | Inmate | Episode: "Fish in a Barrel" |
| 2020 | Dynasty | Duane | Episode: "Battle Lines" |
| 2020 | MacGyver | Suit #1 | Episode: "Father + Son + Father + Matriarch" |
| 2020 | American Soul | Carl | Episode: "Lovely Day" & "So Long, Sucker" |
| 2020 | Chicago Med | Officer Simmons | Episode: "Those Things Hidden in Plain Sight" |
| 2020 | Kings of Jo'burg | Magic | Episode: "We Are Brothers" & "The Sacrifice" |
| 2021 | Covenant | Malcolm Fuller | Episode: "The Promise - Part 1 & 2" |
| 2021-22 | The Game | DeMarco Brown | Recurring cast: season 1 |
| 2022 | Raising Dion | Gary Stafford | Recurring cast: season 2 |
| 2022 | Power Book IV: Force | Tank | Episode: "King of the Goddamn Hill" |
| 2022 | Saints & Sinners | Ray Ray | Recurring cast: season 6 |
| 2023 | Tomorrow's Monsters | Army Medic | Episode: "Introducing: Bridgewater Season 2" |
| 2023 | The Walking Dead: Dead City | Luther | Episodes: "Who's There?" and "People are a Resource" |

== Discography ==
Singles

| Title | Year | Album |
|---|---|---|
| "Do It Like This" | 2009 | |
| "Gone" | 2011 | Non-album single |

Mixtapes

| Title | Released | Label | Format |
|---|---|---|---|
| Mr. Make It Happen (Vol. 1) | 3 Dec 2009 | Slip-n-Slide Records | Streaming |
