= Raising the Dead =

- NCIS: Los Angeles episode
- Episode no.: Season 12; Episode 5
- Directed by: Terrence O’Hara
- Written by: Frank Military
- Production code: 1205
- Original air date: December 6, 2020

Guest appearances
- Frank Military as David Kessler; Izabella Miko as Michelle Boucher; Angel Parker as Secret Service Agent Alicia Monroe; Matt Peters as FBI Agent Michael Rudolph; Daryl Crittenden as Randy Sinclair

Episode chronology
← Previous "Cash Flow"	Next → "If the Fates Allow"

Raising the Dead is the fifth episode of the twelfth season of the American police procedural television series NCIS: Los Angeles, and the 267th episode overall. Written by Frank Military and directed by Terrence O’Hara, the episode originally aired on CBS on December 6, 2020, along with the previous episode, "Cash Flow". In the episode, Kensi must come face-to-face with a sociopath who has been obsessed with her since she put him in jail years ago, in order to get intel on a matter of national security.

== Plot ==
The episode starts with two fugitive men named Randy Sinclair (Daryl Crittenden) and David Kessler (Frank Military) making an escape. While Sinclair continues his path, Kessler goes a different way and is caught by a guard.

Meanwhile, Kensi Blye is tasked by Secret Service Agent Alicia Monroe (Angel Parker) to interview Kessler for the intel, since Kessler has had an obsession for Kensi ever since she put him in jail in 2008 (which also got her into the Office of Special Projects). The rest of the team, minus Deeks due to his NCIS-LAPD liaison having been suspended amidst major department realignments, is looped in on the case. Sam Hanna and Devin Rountree travel to Sinclair's last known whereabouts and discover the corpse of one of the guards that tried to apprehend Sinclair, leading them to determine that Sinclair has backup. Grisha "G." Callen interviews Kessler's ex-girlfriend Michelle Boucher (Izabella Miko).

Nell Jones informs Deeks that his liaison position to NCIS has been officially terminated by the LAPD. Fatima Namazi discovers Kessler's ex-lawyer has a connection to the White House. Kensi offers Kessler a phone call with Boucher, though Kessler casts doubt as she is afraid of him. He is proven correct after Boucher refuses to speak to him. Kessler proposes another solution: he gets a three-minute phone call with the President of the United States in exchange on Sinclair's whereabouts. After his call with the President, Kessler shows Kensi the location of Sinclair's hideout. Sam and Rountree arrive at Sinclair's hideout and capture him.

In the aftermath, Fatima alerts Kensi, Deeks and Callen that Kessler was released from prison eight hours ago under a Presidential Executive Order. Kensi and Deeks hurry to secure location and Callen races to Boucher's house, only to find her gone. He discovers a picture of Kessler and Boucher together, making the team realize that she was not one of Kessler's victims, but his partner, and that Kessler had planned everything the entire time; leverage Sinclair in order to get himself out of prison. Kensi is left a major target for Kessler.

== Production ==
"Raising the Dead" was written by Frank Military who also portrayed sociopath David Kessler.

== Reception ==
The episode was watched by 3.86 million viewers, while scoring 2.30 million DVR viewers, for a total of 6.16 million.

== Future ==
After the airing of "Raising the Dead", David Kessler appeared in "Through the Looking Glass" via postcard. He was referenced in "A Land of Wolves". After that, the Kessler story was never mentioned again.
