= Bobcat Moretti =

Drama film by Rob Margolies

- Directed by: Rob Margolies
- Written by: Rob Margolies; Tim Realbuto
- Produced by: Rob Margolies
- Starring: Tim Realbuto; Vivica A. Fox; Taryn Manning; Coolio; Matt Peters; Sally Kirkland
- Cinematography: Andressa Cordeiro
- Edited by: Taylor Brusky
- Music by: Ilan Rubin
- Production company: Different Duck Films
- Distributed by: Stonecutter Media
- Release dates: October 27, 2022 (Orlando Film Festival); August 4, 2023 (U.S.)
- Running time: 96 minutes
- Country: United States
- Language: English
- Budget: $300,000

Bobcat Moretti is a 2022 American independent sports drama film directed by Rob Margolies and written by Margolies and Tim Realbuto. The film stars off-Broadway actor Realbuto as Bobby 'Bobcat' Moretti, an obese man with multiple sclerosis, who is struggling to cope with personal tragedy and tries to become a boxer as his late father was. The film also starred Vivica A. Fox, Taryn Manning, Coolio, Matt Peters, and Sally Kirkland. Filming began in late 2020 and wrapped in July 2021. Realbuto lost 154 pounds (70 kg) during the filming.

Bobcat Moretti premiered at the 2022 Orlando Film Festival receiving nominations for Best Film, Best Actor (Realbuto) and Best Actress (Fox). It had a limited theatrical release on August 4, 2023.

== Cast ==
- Tim Realbuto as Bobby 'Bobcat' Moretti
- Vivica A. Fox as Joanne 'Jo' Wallis
- Taryn Manning as Debra Moretti
- Coolio as Coolio
- Matt Peters as Charlie Moretti
- Sally Kirkland as Helene Moretti
- Louis Mustillo as Carmine
- Jay Hieron as Tony Pinto
- Matt McCoy as Dr. Shaw
- Mindy Sterling as Jean
- Sheria Irving as Lacey 'Boots' Harris
- Carl McDowell as Clarence
- Erik Potempa as Nate Moretti
- Erin Leddy as Katharine Moretti
- Jaxon Goldenberg as Danny Moretti

== Reception ==
On the review aggregator website Rotten Tomatoes, 80% of 5 critics' reviews are positive, with an average rating of 7.1/10.
