= La cueva (film) =

- Tagline reading "Record everything. I want everyone to know why we did this."
- Directed by: Alfredo Montero
- Written by: Javier Gullón; Alfredo Montero
- Starring: Marta Castellote; Xoel Fernández; Eva García-Vacas; Marcos Ortiz; Jorge Páez
- Cinematography: Alfredo Montero
- Edited by: Nacho Ruiz Capillas; Alfredo Montero
- Music by: Carlos Goñi
- Production companies: Filmax; Morena Films
- Distributed by: Filmax International
- Release date: January 25, 2014 (IFFR)
- Running time: 80 minutes
- Country: Spain
- Language: Spanish

La cueva (Spanish: The Cave, also known as In Darkness We Fall) is a 2014 Spanish language found footage horror film that was directed by Alfredo Montero. The film had its world premiere on January 25, 2014 at the International Film Festival Rotterdam and follows five friends that find that their decision to enter a remote cave may be their last.

== Synopsis ==
Five friends have decided to set out on a vacation to the island of Formentera, where they expect to spend their days full of fun and debauchery.

On one of their outings they come across a cave set in a cliff and decide that it would be exciting to investigate it and see what they could find. However it isn't long before the group realizes that they have lost their way, prompting them to try to find the exit instead of exploring further. Unfortunately they are unsuccessful in their attempt and are forced to stay the night. They consequently find their sanity weakening.

As the lack of food, water, and sunlight paired with the isolation from society due to a lack of cell phone reception begins to take its toll on the group, they find themselves beginning to panic and hallucinate. Eventually their survival will rely on them making certain decisions that will change them forever.

== Cast ==
- Marta Castellote
- Xoel Fernández
- Eva García-Vacas
- Marcos Ortiz
- Jorge Páez

== Reception ==
Fangoria gave the movie two out of four skulls and stated that at times the pacing was uneven and the film had some overly familiar elements, but stated that the movie was overall "an unsettling portrait of humanity". Twitch Film also commented on the movie's similarity to other films in the found footage genre, commenting that viewers would likely be able to predict the movie's events but overall felt that the movie's "impressive, strong third act ensures it will have its fans".

=== Awards ===
- Silver Biznaga for Best Actress at the Málaga Film Festival (Zonazine competition) (2014, won, Eva García-Vacas)
- Silver Biznaga for Best Actor at the Málaga Spanish Film Festival (Zonazine competition) (2014, won, Marcos Ortiz)
- Silver Biznaga for Best Film at the Málaga Spanish Film Festival (Zonazine competition) (2014, won)

== Remake ==
An English-language remake of the film titled Fall into Darkness was announced in July 2021. It will be directed by Roxanne Benjamin, and the cast includes Nell Tiger Free, Thomas Doherty and Lorenza Izzo.

== See also ==
- List of Spanish films of 2014
