= XX (film) =

2017 horror anthology film

- Release poster
- Directed by: Sofia Carrillo; Jovanka Vuckovic; Annie Clark; Roxanne Benjamin; Karyn Kusama
- Written by: Jovanka Vuckovic; Jack Ketchum (adapted); Roxanne Benjamin; Annie Clark; Karyn Kusama
- Produced by: Todd Brown; Nick Spicer
- Starring: Natalie Brown; Melanie Lynskey; Breeda Wool; Christina Kirk
- Cinematography: Ian Anderson; Tarin Anderson; Patrick Cady
- Edited by: L. Gustavo Cooper; Josh Ethier; Courtney Marcilliat; Aaron Marshall; Zach Wiegmann
- Production company: XYZ Films
- Distributed by: Magnet Releasing
- Release dates: January 22, 2017 (Sundance); February 17, 2017 (United States)
- Running time: 80 minutes
- Country: United States
- Language: English
- Budget: $2 million
- Box office: $55,486

XX is a 2017 American horror anthology film directed by Jovanka Vuckovic, Annie Clark, Roxanne Benjamin, and Karyn Kusama. It stars Natalie Brown, Melanie Lynskey, Breeda Wool, and Christina Kirk. It had its world premiere at the Sundance Film Festival on January 22, 2017, and was released in select theaters and through video on demand in the United States on February 17, 2017, by Magnet Releasing.

== Plot ==
=== Framing sequence ===
- Directed by Sofia Carrillo

The anthology is framed by stop-motion-animated segments depicting a walking dollhouse with a blinking doll face on it. A doll hand – separate, but also living – moves from its drawer and scurries around collecting items the dollhouse finds. Within its interior, various objects and items are shown including: a cabinet where bugs and moths enter acting as a stomach of sorts, a room with living sewing needles that make tiny tapestries, and a room with a morphing apple that seems to act as the dollhouse's heart. Eventually, the dollhouse finds a small blackbird (whether it is stuffed or an actual dead bird is ambiguous). The dollhouse places the bird into a baby doll and upon it crying immediately removes the bird and enters a room with an unconscious girl. The girl has a small door on her chest and the dollhouse places the bird inside it. After a while, the girl awakens, pleasing the dollhouse.

=== The Box ===
- Written and directed by Jovanka Vuckovic, based on the short story by Jack Ketchum

While riding on a train with his mother Susan, a young boy, Danny, sees an old man with a red box; the old man describes it as "a present" and allows Danny to look inside. After looking, Danny refuses to eat any food presented to him. Susan and her husband Robert start to worry about him, taking him to a doctor who finds that Danny has lost five pounds since his last checkup. Danny speaks with his sister Jenny, and soon after, she refuses to eat as well. Robert attempts to speak to Danny about his refusal to eat, but Danny whispers something in his ear, which causes Robert to start refusing food.

Susan is haunted by a dream of her family happily eating her at the dinner table. When she sees Danny, Jenny and Robert eating happily, Susan smiles, happy that her husband and kids are finally eating again.

Come Christmas, Danny, Jenny, and Robert are all emaciated, but don't seem to mind. Danny hands Susan a present wrapped in a red box. Susan recalls the incident on the train and connects the dots. When Susan asks Danny what was in the box, he tells her it was "nothing." Susan reveals in a voice-over that all three members of her family later died of starvation: Danny first, then Jenny, then Robert. She is now searching the trains for the man with the box, still wanting to know what is inside, as she feels it is the only way to get close to her family now.

=== The Birthday Party ===
- Written by Roxanne Benjamin and Annie Clark, directed by Annie Clark

Mary is attempting to hold a birthday party for her daughter Lucy, but when she finds her husband David dead in his home office, she decides to hide the body instead of calling 911. She spends the day frantically trying to conceal David's body from Lucy, nanny Carla, and neighbor Madeleine. She finally buys a panda costume off of a man who comes to sing Lucy a birthday song, and hides the body in the costume.

During the party, Mary does not have time to move the costumed body and is forced to set it up on a seat at the table. Carla bumps the costume, causing it to collapse into Lucy's birthday cake. The body is discovered when Carla, attempting to lift the Panda, accidentally removes the head, and the full title of the film is revealed as the children scream in terror: The Birthday Party, or, The Memory Lucy Suppressed From Her Seventh Birthday That Wasn't Really Her Mom's Fault (Even Though Her Therapist Says It's Probably Why She Fears Intimacy).

=== Don't Fall ===
- Written and directed by Roxanne Benjamin

Four friends – Paul, Gretchen, Jess, and Jay – are all on an expedition out in the desert. Gretchen is afraid of heights. The four discover an ancient cave painting depicting an evil spirit before camping out for the night. Gretchen is attacked by a creature similar to the spirit in the painting, which takes over her body and wears her skin. It kills Paul and Jay before chasing Jess, who then falls and breaks her leg. The Gretchen-creature then descends a cliff to kill Jess.

=== Her Only Living Son ===
- Written and directed by Karyn Kusama

This segment serves as an unofficial sequel to Rosemary's Baby.

A doctor speaks with a pregnant woman and agrees to help her go into hiding. She chooses the alias "Cora."

Years later, Cora's rebellious son Andy is about to turn 18. She is called into Andy's school to meet with the principal regarding an incident in which Andy tore off a classmate's fingernails. The principal apologizes to Cora that she had to witness an "outburst" from the classmate's mother, and tells Cora that her son is remarkable. Cora is deeply unnerved that her son appears to have entranced his superiors.

Cora's mailman Chet hints that Andy is not necessarily her distant former husband's (an actor) son. He also hints that her story is well-known. Andy – whose voice has changed and finger and toenails have become claws – confirms her suspicions: he is transforming into the spawn of Satan, something she has worried about since before his birth. Andy, embracing his father's power, forces Cora to bow down to him as Satan enters the house to reclaim him, but she then embraces and quickly tells her son the reason they went into hiding, and asserts that she refuses to give up Andy to his father. Andy, moved, chooses her over his destiny. The two hold each other tight as their bones crack and blood seeps from their noses and mouths until they die from Satan's assault.

== Cast ==
- The Box
  - Natalie Brown as Susan Jacobs
  - Jonathan Watton as Robert Jacobs
  - Peter DaCunha as Danny Jacobs
  - Peyton Kennedy as Jenny Jacobs
  - Ron Lea as Dr. Weller
  - Michael Dyson as The Man
- The Birthday Party
  - Melanie Lynskey as Mary
  - Seth Duhame as David
  - Sanai Victoria as Lucy
  - Sheila Vand as Carla
  - Lindsay Burdge as Madeleine
  - Joe Swanberg as Singing Panda (Uncredited)
- Don't Fall
  - Casey Adams as Paul
  - Breeda Wool as Gretchen
  - Angela Trimbur as Jess
  - Morgan Krantz as Jay
- Her Only Living Son
  - Christina Kirk as Cora
  - Kyle Allen as Andy
  - Mike Doyle as Chet
  - Brenda Wehle as Principal Jenks
  - Morgan Peter Brown as Mr. Dayton
  - Lisa Renee Pitts as Kelly Withers
  - Curt Cornelius as Dr. Roman

== Production ==
In October 2014, it was announced Karyn Kusama, Mary Harron, Jennifer Lynch, and Jovanka Vuckovic would direct the horror anthology film, while Magnet Releasing would distribute the film. In April 2016, it was announced musician St. Vincent would also direct a segment, making her directorial debut. Lynch and Harron were not involved with the final project, being replaced by Roxanne Benjamin.

== Release ==
XX had its world premiere at the Sundance Film Festival on January 22, 2017. The film was released in select theaters and through video on demand in the United States on February 17, 2017, by Magnet Releasing.

== Reception ==
On Rotten Tomatoes, the film holds an approval rating of 69% based on 64 reviews, with an average rating of 6/10. The website's critics consensus reads, "XX's array of distinct female filmmaking voices – and the empowerment their collection represents – offer enough thrills to make up for the overall uneven quality that plagues most anthology projects." On Metacritic, the film has a score of 64 out of 100 based on 15 critics, indicating "generally favorable reviews".

Bloody Disgusting's Ben Larned called the creation of the film "a milestone" and said the "anthology lives up to expectations, and surpasses many male-dominated efforts of its kind" ultimately giving it a 4/5 rating. Sean Smithson writing for Shock Till You Drop said "XX is marking the spot for the future of horror" and noted "I’m ready for a second installment."

David Rooney of The Hollywood Reporter stated, "while it's worth applauding the women-to-the-fore directive, the usual limits apply. With each short running around 20 minutes, there's little time to develop character or dramatic nuance, let alone lay the crucial groundwork to seed escalating terror."
