= Martin Spanjers =

American actor

- Born: February 2, 1987 (age 39); Tucson, Arizona, U.S.
- Occupation: Actor
- Years active: 1994–present
- Notable work: Rory Hennessy in 8 Simple Rules
- Awards: Young Artist Award; 2004 8 Simple Rules

Martin Brian Spanjers (born February 2, 1987) is an American actor. He played Rory Hennessy on the ABC sitcom 8 Simple Rules from 2002 to 2005, for which he won a Young Artist Award in 2004, and as Justin in Good Luck Charlie (2010–2014).

== Life and career ==
Spanjers was born and raised in Tucson, Arizona. His father, Frank, is a facilities administrator, and his mother, Sara, is an artist. He has an older brother, Matt. His paternal grandparents emigrated from the Netherlands, settling in Wisconsin. Spanjers auditioned for the starring role of Malcolm in Malcolm in the Middle, almost getting it, but did get a guest spot in the show's pilot episode. Although he did not make it to Malcolm, he was able to show up in 8 Simple Rules. Spanjers made a guest appearance as Davie in the first episode of the fourth season of Cold Case, "Rampage." He made guest appearances in many other TV shows as well. He currently resides in Los Angeles, California.

In 2006, he provided the voice for Sugimura in the English dub of the Studio Ghibli film Whisper of the Heart. Spanjers appeared as Randy Randinger in the sports spoof The Comebacks, released on October 19, 2007. He also shot commercials for Pizza Hut double stuffed pizza, Sprint Nextel and T-Mobile.

Spanjers appeared in a music video for the group Three Loco, which includes Andy Milonakis, Dirt Nasty, and Riff Raff.

== Filmography ==
Year	Title	Role
2019	Body at Brighton Rock	Davey
2016	Angel from Hell	P.J.
2014	Black Jesus	Ross
2011	Sassy Pants	Shayne Pruitt
2011	Better with You	Hunter
2010	90210	Barry the Barista
2010–2012	Good Luck Charlie	Justin (recurring)
2009	Saving Grace	Lance Iverson
2009	Just Peck	Marty Binkman
2008–2009	True Blood	Young Sam
2008	Moonlight	Paparazzo
2008	iCarly	David (Episode: "iFence")
2007	Grey's Anatomy	Hunter
2007	The Comebacks	Randy Randinger
2006	Whisper of the Heart	Sugimura (voice, English dub)
2006	Cold Case	Davie
2004	Andy Richter Controls the Universe	Jake
2003	All About the Andersons	Andrew
2003	Home	Jake
2003	Kim Possible	Malcolm the Wraithmaster (voice)
2002–2005	8 Simple Rules	Rory Henessey
2002	First Monday	Randall
2002	Evil Alien Conquerors	Jimmy
2001	The Hughleys	Myles
2001	Max Keeble's Big Move	Runty Band Member
2000	Touched by an Angel	Brian Hanigan
2000	Grosse Pointe (Pilot)	Adam
2000	Perfect Game	Brian
2000	Malcolm in the Middle (Pilot)	Richard
2000	Daddio	Max Woods
1998	Two of a Kind	Brian
1997	The Ride	George
1995	My Father Is a Hero	Johnny Kung (English dub)

== Awards ==
Awards
Year	Result	Award	Category	Nominated Work
2001	Nominated	Young Artist Awards	Best Performance in a TV Comedy Series: Supporting Young Actor	Daddio
2003	Nominated	Young Artist Awards	Best Performance in a TV Series (Comedy or Drama): Leading Young Actor	8 Simple Rules
2004	Won	Young Artist Awards	Best Performance in a TV Series (Comedy or Drama): Leading Young Actor	8 Simple Rules
2007	Won	WorldFest Houston	Drama	First Night
