= Southbound (2015 film) =

2015 horror anthology film

- Theatrical release poster
- Directed by: Radio Silence (The Way Out and The Way In); Roxanne Benjamin (Siren); David Bruckner (The Accident); Patrick Horvath (Jailbreak)
- Written by: Matt Bettinelli-Olpin (The Way Out and The Way In); Roxanne Benjamin (Siren); Susan Burke (Siren); David Bruckner (The Accident); Patrick Horvath (Jailbreak); Dallas Hallam (Jailbreak)
- Produced by: Brad Miska; Roxanne Benjamin; Radio Silence; Greg Newman; Chris Harding
- Starring: see below
- Cinematography: Tyler Gillett (The Way Out and The Way In); Tarin Anderson (Siren); Alexandre Naufel (Jailbreak); Andrew Shulkind (The Accident)
- Edited by: Matt Bettinelli-Olpin (The Way Out and The Way In); Tyler Gillett (The Way Out & The Way In); Jason Eisner (Siren); Roxanne Benjamin (Siren); David Bruckner (The Accident); Patrick Horvath (Jailbreak)
- Music by: The Gifted
- Production companies: Willowbrook Regent Films; Soapbox Films; Radio Silence Productions
- Distributed by: The Orchard
- Release dates: September 16, 2015 (TIFF); February 5, 2016 (United States)
- Running time: 89 minutes
- Country: United States
- Language: English
- Box office: $23,665

Southbound is a 2015 American horror anthology film directed by Radio Silence, Roxanne Benjamin, David Bruckner, and Patrick Horvath. Produced by Brad Miska and Roxanne Benjamin, the film premiered at the TIFF on September 16, 2015, and was given a limited theatrical release in the USA on February 5, 2016. The film was included on numerous Best Horror Films of 2016 lists including those by Rolling Stone, BuzzFeed and the Thrillist.

== Plot ==
=== The Way Out ===
- Directed by Radio Silence
- Written by Matt Bettinelli-Olpin

Mitch and Jack are on the run from mysterious floating creatures. Filled with remorse, Mitch looks at a photograph of his daughter, Katherine, as they drive down a nameless highway. Out in the desert, Mitch sees the creatures stalking them, but does not tell Jack. In desperation, the pair pulls up to a run-down gas station. Inside, the men witness strange events as the creatures stalk them from afar. As Mitch and Jack attempt to escape, they pull up to the same gas station further down the road. Jack tries to leave as the creatures close in on the pair, and is killed. Mitch, believing that this is the fate he deserves, refuses to leave and instead follows the creatures to a nearby motel. He enters room 6255 and finds himself in a home he recognizes. Hearing his daughter's voice, Mitch follows the sounds and finds an apparition of his daughter, Katherine, who begs for his help. As he moves closer to his daughter, however, she continues to run away. Mitch is trapped in the hallway of the house, tormented until death by the regret that he was not able to help his daughter.

=== Siren ===
- Directed by Roxanne Benjamin
- Written by Roxanne Benjamin & Susan Burke

At the same motel are Sadie, Ava, and Kim, traveling musicians in a band called The White Tights. Leaving the motel, visiting landmarks, stalked by the floating creatures, their van's tire goes flat, and they are forced to pull over. Stranded in the middle of the desert, they are picked up by a friendly, eccentric couple. In the backseat of their car, Sadie sees a bear trap. The band is taken to the couple's house further down the road. Inside, the band is shown to their room; Sadie hears the woman mention their late friend Alex, but neither Ava nor Kim seems to notice. At dinner with the Kensingtons, who live nearby with twin sons, they are served a meal of burnt roast beef; Sadie, a vegetarian, politely declines. Before eating, the two families recite a strange prayer, seemingly satanic in nature. After dinner, Kim begins to blame Sadie for Alex's death, and both Ava and Kim suddenly begin vomiting a black substance. Sadie gets help, and the people in the house give Ava and Kim a white liquid medicine to drink. Sadie confronts her friends for their strange behavior and tries to persuade them to leave; they refuse, in a trance, and decide to stay the night at the house. That night, Sadie had a nightmare of Alex being killed in a car accident. Waking up in the middle of the night, Ava and Kim are gone. She finds them outside, around a bonfire, participating in a strange cult ritual with the others in the house. Investigating from the bush nearby, Sadie's foot becomes caught in the bear trap seen in the couple's car the day before. Hearing the commotion, Ava and Kim give chase as Sadie escapes the trap and flees into a nearby shed, where she is accosted by an apparition of Alex. Terrified, Sadie runs out into the road and hails an approaching car for help, only to get run over by a car in a cruel twist of fate.

On the road behind her, one of the enigmatic floating creatures is watching Sadie.

=== The Accident ===
- Directed by David Bruckner
- Written by David Bruckner

The car's driver, Lucas, is talking to his wife, Claire, on the phone. Distracted, he does not see Sadie, and she is hit by his car. Lucas exits the car and sees Sadie lying on the ground, critically injured, and calls 911; however, he is unable to tell the dispatcher where he is. A certified EMT gets on the line to help. The dispatcher and the EMT tell Lucas to drive Sadie to a nearby town, where he finds a medical facility. Entering the facility, he finds it completely abandoned. After searching for help, the dispatcher decides to guide Lucas through performing lifesaving surgery. A third voice, that of a doctor, gets on the line. The voices convince Lucas to painfully wrap a tourniquet around Sadie's almost severed leg, insert a tube into her throat so that she can breathe, and cut into her rib cage, reaching into the inside of her chest to manually compress her lungs, which finally kills her. The voices begin to laugh at Lucas, and he hangs up. He tries to escape the hospital but finds all the doors locked. Shortly after, his phone rings again; the dispatchers persuade Lucas to talk about the incident. They agree that Lucas did not deserve this and promptly tell him that he can leave. They mysteriously provide him with access to clean clothes and a new car, so it will seem as though nothing happened. Lucas, hesitant to leave, is reassured that he need not worry about Sadie's death. He leaves the facility, enters the car, and drives away.

As he does, one of the floating creatures can be seen on the edge of the road, overseeing the events.

=== Jailbreak ===
- Directed by Patrick Horvath
- Written by Dallas Hallam & Patrick Horvath

Sandy, the dispatcher on the phone with Lucas, watches him drive away from a nearby payphone. She hangs up and walks into a bar named The Trap; across the parking lot, Danny gets out of his car. Inside, the bartender, Al, reprimands Sandy for leaving the door open. An argument ensues between the two, and Warren, another patron in the bar. Danny barges in with a shotgun and demands to know the location of his sister. Warren, revealed to be a demon, cuts a gash into Danny's back; Danny blows off Warren's clawed hand with the shotgun. Danny takes Al hostage and forces him to drive to his sister's location: the back room of an ice cream parlor. By looking through the tattoo in his own hand, Al can see demons closing in on Danny as Al leads him through a secret entrance into a hidden room. Inside the room, he finds his sister Jesse applying a tattoo to a patron's back, similar to the tattoo in Al's hand. Danny tells Jesse he has come to rescue her; she says she is there by choice and refuses to leave. Danny kills Al and kidnaps his sister, carrying her to his car. The locals, all demons, chase Danny as he drives quickly away. They drive for some time and then stop when the road peters out into the desert. Jesse begs Danny not to go off the road; Danny, with the locals in pursuit, decides he has no other option. The car shakes violently as the pair drives out into the desert, seeing nothing up ahead, and eventually, Danny stops it. Jesse reveals that she killed their parents and that she deserves to live in the town. The demons pull Danny out of the car, stripping him; Jesse leaves him behind and drives away. She smiles and turns on the radio.

As she drives, one of the floating creatures is visible in the moonlight, overseeing Jesse's plight.

=== The Way In ===
- Directed by Radio Silence
- Written by Matt Bettinelli-Olpin

Jem exits the bathroom at Freez'n Over and sees Jesse walk back to the secret door. Jem then rejoins her parents, Cait, and Daryl to finish their food. Jem is going to college, and this is their last weekend together before she leaves. As they leave Freez'n Over, someone in the parking lot watches them get into their car and drive to their vacation house. They are about to have dinner when three masked men break into the house. Daryl and Cait are caught while Jem hides. Daryl realizes that he knows who the men are and what they want, and begs them to spare his family. One of the men whispers to Cait what Daryl did, and she is astonished at her husband's secret. The same man then kills her in front of her husband. Jem then stabs one of the men in the back with scissors and takes the bat he was holding. Surprisingly, the other two tell her to leave. She runs away, and they kill Daryl. As he is dying, the man in the mask holds up the photograph of Katherine that Mitch was looking at in The Way Out to be the last thing he ever sees. After Daryl is dead, they remove their masks and are recognized as Mitch and Jack. As they are leaving, Jem returns and fights back. She injures them badly, but when she is about to escape, Mitch kills her. The men feel guilty for going too far, but it is too late. Outside, the ground opens up as the enigmatic floating creatures from below come through the dead bodies. The men try to escape, but the third masked man is dragged down by the tentacles from beneath the Earth. As the ground behind them continues to crumble, Mitch and Jack drive away. They are chased by one of the floating creatures, but Jack accelerates and runs it down. Jack says they are going home as they get back on the highway. Mitch looks at a photograph of his daughter, Katherine, as they drive away. Out in the desert, Mitch sees the creatures stalking them, but does not tell Jack.

The segments end the movie in a cyclical fashion, showing scenes from the start of the first segment and revealing that everything is a time loop.

== Cast ==
- Chad Villella as Mitch
- Matt Bettinelli-Olpin as Jack
- Fabianne Therese as Sadie
- Hannah Marks as Ava
- Nathalie Love as Kim
- Kate Beahan as Cait
- Davey Johnson as Dale
- Susan Burke as Betty
- Tyler Tuione as Warren
- Gerald Downey as Daryl
- Larry Fessenden as The D.J (voice)
- Dana Gould as Raymond Kensington
- Anessa Ramsey as Betty Kensington/Phone Operator
- Hassie Harrison as Jem
- Davey Johnson as Dale
- Tipper Newton as Jesse
- Maria Olsen as Sandy
- Kristina Pesic as Sutter
- Matt Peters as Al
- David Yow as Danny
- Mather Zickel as Lucas
- Justin Welborn as Surgeon (voice)
- Karla Droege as EMT (voice)
- Karina Fontes as Alex
- Roxanne Benjamin as Claire
- Max and Nick Folkman as The Kensington Twins
- Brad Miska as Diner Patron

== Production ==
Producers Brad Miska and Radio Silence began working together in 2014 to develop the concept, with Miska bringing on Benjamin, Bruckner, and Horvath to fill the other director roles.

Pre-production began shortly thereafter, and the filmmakers (most of whom had previously worked together on V/H/S) collaborated throughout the process.

Principal photography took place in various locations throughout the greater Los Angeles area and the Mojave Desert in 2015, including Twentynine Palms and Amboy. Roy's was filmed at Roy's Motel and Café in Amboy, California.

== Music ==
The score was composed and recorded by The Gifted, using authentic analog synths. The official soundtrack was released on February 9, 2016, by Headquarters Music.

The film features songs by Mickey Western, Link 80, Barbara Paul, The-Front, Lay Low, Patrick Horvath, Ben Lovett with Ryan Levine, Nick Africano, the Soft White Sixties, and the Atom Age.

On February 1, 2017, Mondo released a limited edition vinyl pressing of the score. The one-off pressing is on sand-colored vinyl with a solid black label.

== Release ==
The film had its world premiere at the Toronto International Film Festival on September 16, 2015. Shortly after, The Orchard acquired distribution rights to the film. The film went onto screen at the AFI Fest, Fantastic Fest, and the Sitges Film Festival,

The film began a limited theatrical release in the United States on February 5, 2016, and was subsequently released on video on demand on February 9, 2016.

Sony Pictures Home Entertainment released the film on DVD on May 17, 2016. It includes numerous special features such as director's commentary, behind-the-scenes photos and videos, and deleted scenes.

The Blu-ray version of the film was released in the United Kingdom by StudioCanal on August 8, 2016, and featured new cover art by Andy Belanger.

== Reception ==
On the review aggregator website Rotten Tomatoes, Southbound holds an approval rating of 81% based on 52 reviews, with an average rating of 6.7/10. The website's critics consensus reads, "Southbound doesn't entirely avoid the jarring shifts common to anthology films, but thanks to some thrilling twists and turns, this horror road movie is a surprisingly smooth ride." Metacritic reports a 58 out of 100 rating based on 11 critics, indicating "mixed or average reviews".

The New York Times' Neil Genzlinger gave the film a positive review, and wrote: "Its five segments do what they're supposed to do—unsettle you—but as a bonus, they also leave you wanting more. These are fragments more than complete stories, and the incompleteness is its own kind of creepiness. The filmmakers aren't after tidy tales, neatly connected and concluded. They know that the human mind finds loose ends unnerving." Richard Roeper of the Chicago Sun-Times described it as "one of the smartest and scariest movies in recent memory", and Rolling Stone's David Ehrlich compared the film to "episodes of Twilight Zone that a baked Rod Serling might have written after watching Carnival of Souls, these chapters are eerie to the extreme, and seedy enough to make you feel like you're watching something you were never meant to see. It gets under your skin because it knows there's nothing scarier than realizing that—no matter how far you drive—the evil in your rearview mirror is always closer than it appears."

Frank Scheck of The Hollywood Reporter gave the film a positive review: "The vignettes are cleverly interwoven by having situations or characters bleeding over from one to the next, and despite the multiple helmers and scripters involved, the film boasts a strong stylistic consistency. Featuring fine performances by its ensemble... Southbound should well please genre fans nostalgic for the likes of Tales From the Crypt and Creepshow." Nicolas Rapold of Film Comment wrote: "This anthology of five horror tales is the rare group effort without a dud, as it cruises through variations on the genre with style and confidence." Todd Brown, founder and editor of Twitch Film, described the film as the "Twilight Zone for the indie horror generation."

The film was included on numerous Best Horror Films of 2016 lists including Rolling Stone's "10 Best Horror Movies of 2016", BuzzFeed's "The 19 Best Horror Films Of 2016" and the Thrillist's "Best Horror Movies of 2016: The Year's Scariest Films."

Paul Thomas Anderson called the film "a hidden gem."

== Easter eggs and hidden meanings ==
There are numerous allusions to the film's alternate meanings hidden throughout the segments; most popular theories suggest that the main characters are trapped in Purgatory, where they are forced to endlessly pay for the sins they committed while living.

These allusions and easter eggs include the clearly visible bullet wound on Mitch; the blood spatter on the motel wall; bullet holes that mysteriously appear after Mitch becomes trapped in the motel, implying a connection between the room and bullet wound's scar on Mitch; the implication that the ancillary characters have all participated in the situations before; the same dispatch voice heard every time a character calls 911; the suggestion that Danny has transcended the physical world to find his sister; the use of Carnival of Souls (the films share similar themes and storylines); the clerk at the truck stop is named "Sutter", which is an allusion to "Sutter Kane" from John Carpenter's In the Mouth of Madness, another film with similar themes; mirrored dialogue, scenes and images throughout; the creatures being visible in each story; elements of the production design that include the word "fear" visible in the magazine Sutter is reading; the flyer for The White Tights in the Jailbreak segment, Jack's "Only God Can Judge Me" tattoo, and the name of the bar that Danny breaks into: "The Trap".

Additionally, The Way Out and The Way In feature numerous connective visual and audible easter eggs throughout to establish the narrative and physical connection between the stories, creating the film's never-ending loop and pointing towards its hidden meanings. These include:

1. The truck from The Way Out is visible in the "Freez'n Over" parking lot at the beginning of The Way In.
2. The house is the same in both The Way Out and The Way In and many of the same shots are used, including of the decorative lights outside (when Mitch enters in The Way Out and when the masked man enters in The Way In) and when Jem walks down the same hallway where Mitch gets trapped.
3. In The Way Out, the creatures stalk Mitch and Jack in exactly the same way that Mitch and Jack stalk the family in The Way In, first from afar before closing in; similar shots are used in both.
4. Jack is grabbed by the creature in the bathroom with a T-shirt, which is what he used to kill Cait.
5. The shaking in Roy's Cafe is the sound made when the ground opens up in The Way In, implying that these are the creatures below the diner.
6. When Jack is killed by the creature, he dies in much the same way as Cait did when he suffocated her.
7. The knocks that lure Mitch into the motel room in The Way Out are the same pattern as the knocks from outside the house in The Way In.
8. The motel room that Mitch enters is room 6255 in The Way Out, the same as the house's address in The Way In.
9. The mask that Mitch wears in The Way In is visible on the table in the last shot of The Way Out, and it is what he was looking at when he first hears his daughter giggle.
10. The songs "Don't Let the Party End" and "Goodbye, Goodbye" are used in both, though different parts of the songs are played.
11. The DJ's voice-over (Larry Fessenden) is in both segments however the ending version has slightly different dialogue implying that the loop is not the same every time and that the characters have the option of making better choices with the possibility that they may be allowed to escape should they cease to make the same wrong choices time and time again.

== See also ==
- List of films featuring home invasions
