= Alisha Wainwright =

American actress

- Born: Alisha Ena Wainwright; July 14, 1988 (age 38); Orlando, Florida, United States
- Occupation: Actress
- Years active: 2008–present

Alisha Ena Wainwright (born July 14, 1988) is an American actress. Following her film debut in Just Before I Go (2014), Wainwright had supporting roles in films such as Death of a Telemarketer (2020) and Palmer (2021), as well as a lead role in There's Something Wrong with the Children (2023). She is best known for her leading roles as Maia Roberts on the second and third seasons of the Freeform supernatural drama series Shadowhunters (2017–19) and Nicole Warren on the Netflix superhero drama series Raising Dion (2019–22).

== Early life ==
Alisha Wainwright was born in Orlando, Florida. She attended Cypress Bay High School in Weston, Florida. Her mother is from Jamaica and her father is from Haiti.

== Career ==
After appearing in a web comedy sketch on the YouTube channel Smosh in 2012, Wainwright guest-starred in several film and television productions including Criminal Minds and Lethal Weapon. In September 2016, her casting as the werewolf Maia Roberts on Freeform's fantasy series Shadowhunters, based on The Mortal Instruments book series by Cassandra Clare was announced. After being a recurring character in season 2, she was promoted to series regular for season 3 of the show. Wainwright currently stars in the Netflix series Raising Dion. In 2023, Wainwright began hosting When Science Finds a Way, a podcast produced by the Wellcome Trust that explores global health challenges through personal stories and scientific innovation.

== Filmography ==
=== Film ===
Year	Title	Role	Notes
2013	Second Rate Deal	Nikki	Short film
2014	Just Before I Go	Sarah	
2016	Save Her	Casting Assistant #1	Short film
2017	The Hatred	Betaine	
2020	Death of a Telemarketer	Christine	
2021	Palmer	Maggie Hayes	
2023	There's Something Wrong with the Children	Margaret Winslow	
2025	Bird In Hand	Bird	

=== Television ===
Year	Title	Role	Notes
2014	Criminal Minds	Debbie Martin	Episode "What Happens in Mecklinburg..."
2014	Married	Alissa	Episode "Uncool"
2014	Love is Relative	Audrey	TV movie
2014–2015	Perception	Chantal Douglas / Timid Girl	Episode "Possession" (Timid Girl - uncredited) Episode "Romeo" (Chantal Douglas)
2015	Vanity	Shelly	Episode "Expression"
2015	Switched at Birth	Darya	Episode "To the Victor Belong the Spoils"
2015	Major Crimes	Ainsley Reed	Episode "Blackout"
2015	Axle Tramp	Anna	
2016	General Hospital	Nurse Kelsey	2 episodes
2015–2016	Disney Star Darlings	Leona (voice)	10 episodes
2016	Rosewood	Cassie Hanson	Episode "Forward Motion & Frat Life"
2018	Lethal Weapon	Jess Bailey	Episode "Double Shot of Baileys"
2018	The Wedding Do Over	Taylor	Tv Movie
2017–2019	Shadowhunters	Maia Roberts	Recurring role (Season 2), 13 episodes Main role (Season 3), 16 episodes
2019–2022	Raising Dion	Nicole Reese	Main role
2023-	Platonic	Audrey	4 episodes

=== Other ===
Year	Title	Role	Notes
2012	Smosh	Anthony's girlfriend	
2016	NBA 2K17	Alanah Turner (voice)	Video game
