= Jazmyn Simon =

American actress (born 1980)

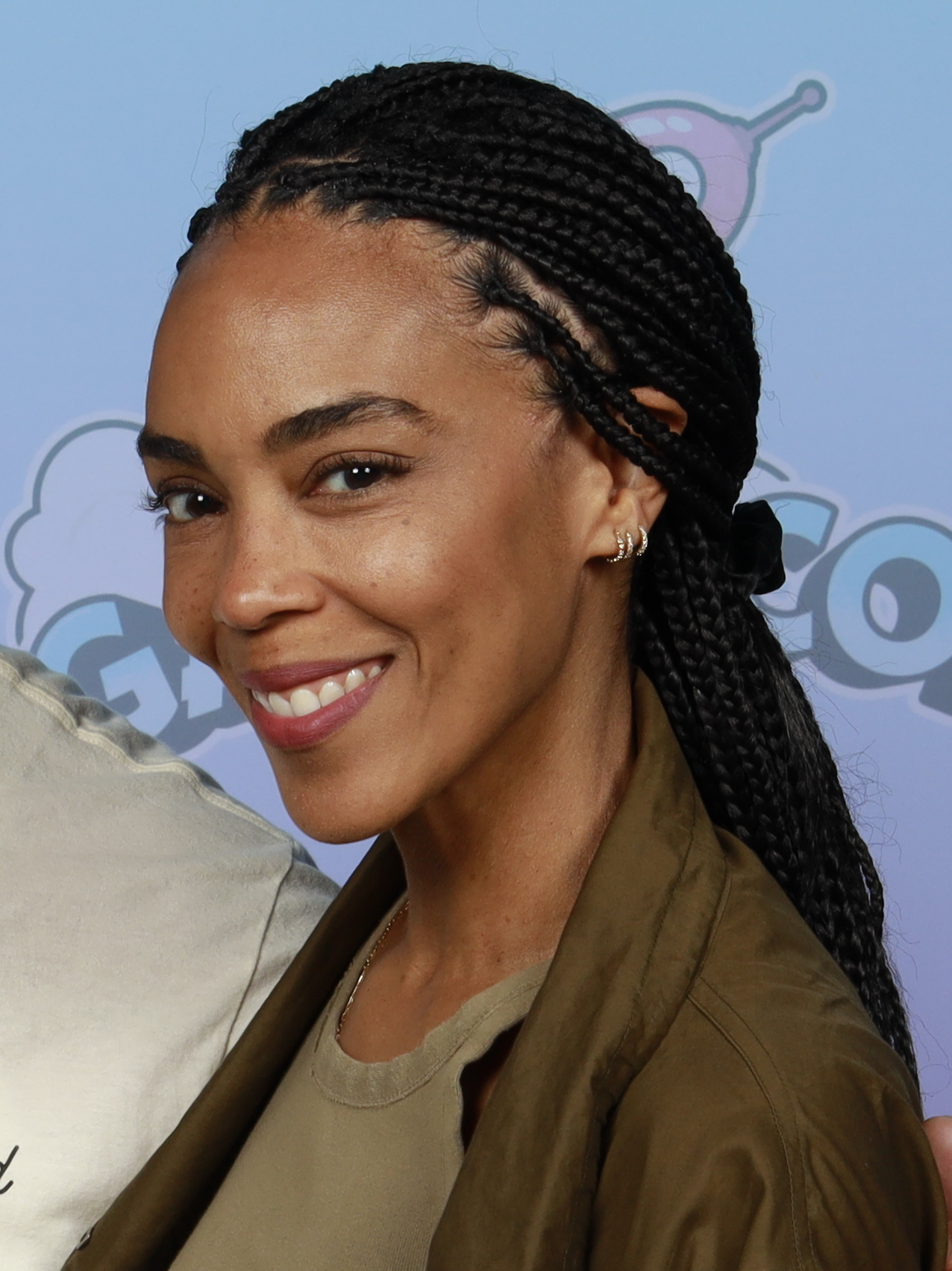
- Simon at GalaxyCon San Jose in 2024
- Born: December 30, 1980 (age 45); San Francisco, California, U.S.
- Years active: 2008–present
- Spouse: Dulé Hill (m. 2018)
- Children: 2

Jazmyn Simon (born December 30, 1980) is an American actress and children's book author known for her roles on Ballers, Raising Dion, and Psych.

== Early life ==
Jazmin Simon was born in San Francisco and spent her early childhood in Northern California. She is of African American heritage, and her background includes some Creole ancestry. Around middle school, Simon moved to Las Vegas, where she was raised by her grandparents.

During high school, Simon was recruited to appear on a local radio talk show and eventually became a full-time member of the show. Influenced by her radio experience, Simon attended the University of Nevada for college to study production. It was during her college experience that she began to pursue acting.

== Career ==
After graduating with a degree in communication, Simon moved to Chicago. She worked as a sales assistant at HBO and a waitress while pursuing an acting career by joining the improv troupe The Second City and appearing in commercials.

Simon then moved to Los Angeles to pursue acting more seriously. She has described the hardships of becoming a professional actor, stating that she was turned down in more than 200 auditions before finding regular work. Simon's big break came when she was cast as Julie Greene, a doctor and the wife of a recently retired NFL player, on Ballers. During the first season she was the only female series regular.

Following her role on Ballers, Simon has appeared as Selene in Psych: The Movie, Psych 2: Lassie Come Home, and Psych 3: This Is Gus and in Acrimony as June. In 2019 she was cast as Kat Neese on the Netflix series Raising Dion, which ended in 2022.

Simon authored a children's book in 2022, titled Most Perfect You, inspired by conversations with her daughter, and coauthored another children's book Repeat After Me with her husband.

== Personal life ==
Simon married actor Dulé Hill in 2018. They met on the set of Ballers, and have appeared in several projects together, including the Psych movies, Locked Down, and The Wonder Years. She has a daughter from a previous relationship, whom Hill has adopted. In 2019, Simon gave birth to their son.

== Filmography ==
=== Film ===
Year	Title	Role	Notes
2013	Baggage Claim	Underground Club Hostess	
2018	Acrimony	June	
2021	Locked Down	Maria	

=== Television ===
Year	Title	Role	Notes
2011	Parks and Recreation	Waitress	Episode: "I'm Leslie Knope"
2013	Welcome to the Family	Receptionist	Episode: "Dan Finds Out"
2013	Hello Ladies	Door Woman	Episode: "The Drive"
2014	F#Cker of the Month	Jazmyn	Episode: "Call Today"
2014	Sister Dirty	Summer	Episode: "Sister Dirty Goes Dancing"
2015–2019	Ballers	Julie Greane / Julia Greane	Main cast
2016	The Hindenburg Explodes!	Trixie	Television film
2017	Psych: The Movie	Selene	Television film
2018	The Resident	Christine Conforth	Episode: "None the Wiser"
2018	Mom	Vanessa	Episode: "Eight Cats and the Hat Show"
2019	Styling Hollywood	Herself	Episode: "Taraji & Yara & Zazie, Oh My!"
2019- 2022	Raising Dion	Kat	Main cast
2020	Psych 2: Lassie Come Home	Selene	Television film
2021	Psych 3: This Is Gus	Selene	Television film
2022	The Wonder Years	Janice	Episode:"Bill's New Gig"
2025	High Potential	A'ja	Episode: "The RAMs"
