= Raising Dion =

American superhero science fiction television series

- Genre: Superhero; Science fiction; Adventure; Family drama
- Created by: Carol Barbee
- Based on: Raising Dion by Dennis Liu
- Starring: Ja'Siah Young; Alisha Wainwright; Jazmyn Simon; Sammi Haney; Jason Ritter; Griffin Robert Faulkner; Ali Ahn
- Music by: Kris Bowers
- Country of origin: United States
- Original language: English
- No. of seasons: 2
- No. of episodes: 17

Production
- Executive producers: Carol Barbee; Charles D. King; Kim Roth; Poppy Hanks; Kenny Goodman; Dennis Liu; Seith Mann; Michael Green; Michael B. Jordan; Marta Fernandez; Darren Grant
- Producers: Robert F. Phillips; Edward Ricourt; Juanita Diana Feeney; Montez A. Monroe
- Cinematography: Armando Salas; Peter Flinckenberg; Richard Vialet; Jon Delgado
- Editors: James D. Wilcox; Scott James Wallace; Elisa R. Cohen; William Yeh; Matthew V. Colonna; Danielle L. Statuto
- Running time: 36–50 minutes
- Production companies: Fixed Mark Productions; MACRO; Outlier Society Productions

Original release
- Network: Netflix
- Release: October 4, 2019 – February 1, 2022

Raising Dion is an American superhero drama television series that premiered on October 4, 2019, on Netflix. It is based on the 2015 comic book and short film of the same name by Dennis Liu. In January 2020, Netflix renewed the series for a second and final season which premiered on February 1, 2022.

== Premise ==
=== Season One ===
Raising Dion follows the story of a woman named Nicole who raises her son Dion after the death of her husband Mark. The normal dramas of raising a son as a single mom are amplified when Dion starts to manifest several superhero-like abilities. Nicole must now keep her son's gifts secret with the help of Mark's best friend Pat, and protect Dion from people out to exploit him while figuring out the origin of his abilities.

=== Season Two ===
Two years after the first season was set, Dion and his two friends Esperanza and Johnathon return as a juvenile city ‘peace-keeper’, keeping activity in order. However, the crooked energy possesses Brayden, a child from Alabama, coming specifically for Dion. The Crooked Energy then plants a disease into one of three sinkholes internationally, which eventually infects Nicole. This causes a major problem, as the infection proves fatal and highly contagious.

== Cast and characters ==
=== Main ===
- Ja'Siah Young as Dion Warren, Nicole's young, superpowered son
- Alisha Wainwright as Nicole Warren, a widowed mother who is raising her son alone while trying to manage his supernatural abilities after the death of her husband.
- Jazmyn Simon as Kat Neese, Nicole's older sister who is a surgeon.
- Sammi Haney as Esperanza Jimenez, Dion's classmate and best friend. She also has osteogenesis imperfecta (brittle bone disease).
- Jason Ritter as Pat Rollins, an engineer at a biotech company called BIONA, Mark's best friend and Dion's godfather.
- Griffin Robert Faulkner as Brayden Mills (season 2, recurring season 1)
- Ali Ahn as Suzanne Wu (season 2, recurring season 1), a scientist and the CEO of BIONA

=== Recurring ===
- Michael B. Jordan as Mark Warren, a scientist, Dion's father and Nicole's deceased husband, who secretly was given superpowers by the aurora event in Iceland and is trapped as a spirit after having been absorbed by the Crooked Man
- Gavin Munn as Jonathan King, Dion's classmate and bully-turned-friend.
- Skyler Elyse Philpot as Steffi, Dion's classmate and popular skater kid
- Donald Paul as Mr. Anthony Fry, Dion's science teacher
- Matt Lewis as Mr. Campbell, Dion's school principal
- Marc Menchaca as Walter Mills, a farmer who is a superpowered man from the Iceland event. He is absorbed into the Crooked Man, leaving his son Brayden, who developed telepathy due to his father's own superpowers, alone.
- Moriah Brown as Willa
- Cade Tropeano as Dubious Boy, Dion's classmate and school show member
- Diana Chiritescu as Jill Noonan
- Kylen Davis as Malik, Nicole's teenage neighbor and Tessa's son
- Dana Gourrier as Tessa, Nicole's neighbor and Malik's mother
- J. Harrison Ghee as Kwame
- Deirdre Lovejoy as Charlotte Tuck, a woman saved by Mark in a storm. She is another woman with superpowers from the Iceland event.
- Josh Ventura as David Marsh (season 2), the new vice president of operations at BIONA
- Rome Flynn as Tevin Wakefield (season 2), Dion's new trainer at BIONA who has powers and Nicole's love interest
- Aubriana Davis as Janelle Carr (season 2), a 15-year-old who has trouble controlling her powers
- Michael Anthony as Gary Stafford (season 2), a security guard at Dion's school
- Tracey Bonner as Simone Carr (season 2), Janelle's mother

== Episodes ==
=== Series overview ===
Season	Episodes	Originally released
1	9	October 4, 2019
2	8	February 1, 2022

=== Season 1 (2019) ===
No. overall	No. in season	Title	Directed by	Written by	Original release date
1	1	"ISSUE #101: How Do You Raise a Superhero?"	Seith Mann	Carol Barbee	October 4, 2019
A woman named Nicole Warren struggles to raise her only young son named Dion after the death of her husband, Mark. Unaware of Dion's superpowers, Nicole drops him off at school, where he struggles to fit in: as she hurries back to the car, Nicole received a message that she's been fired for being late for work. Dion left school and goes to the skate park where he performs an intense skateboard trick in front of his classmates before Nicole arrives, angry at Dion for skipping school, and brings him home. After grounding Dion, Nicole reluctantly lets him go out with his godfather and Mark's best friend, Pat Rollins. Pat brings Dion back home, where Nicole suddenly finds out about Dion's superpowers when he uses telekinesis to move items around, wreaking havoc in the living room. Taking Dion to hospital, Nicole tries to warn her older sister, Kat, about Dion's superpowers, but she does not believe her. Nicole and Dion go to the cabin in the forest, where Nicole flashes back to when she was a ballet dancer. At the lake, Dion uses his powers to levitate fish in water bubbles and sway the trees uncontrollably. That night, Nicole and Dion discovers numerous ghostly spirits, whom Dion calls "rain people". Mark's spirit appears in front of them before disappearing, along with the rain people, leaving Nicole shocked and Dion confused.
2	2	"ISSUE #102: Fortress of Solitude"	Seith Mann	Joshua Sternin & Jennifer Ventimilia	October 4, 2019
After encountering the rain people at night, Nicole decides to call a woman named Charlotte Tuck, for whom she leaves a voicemail to phone back. Nicole meets Detective Miller, who asks her about a woman named Jill Noonan, who owns the cabin and went missing during the storm the previous night. When Nicole says she did not know, Miller leaves, telling her to call him if anything happens. Nicole calls Pat and tells him about the news and Charlotte Tuck, about whom he claims he did not know anything. While Nicole teaches Dion how to get better control over his powers, he gets distracted when he spots a squirrel and starts chasing it, teleporting to the top of the tree before Nicole helps him down. Offered a job at a hospital, Nicole returns to Atlanta with Dion for an interview. After a mishap during an interview, Kat calls Pat about Dion's behavior and Nicole decides to baby-proof the house against Dion's powers. Nicole receives a call from Pat, who tell her that Charlotte went radio silent the day Mark died. Dion, wearing a superhero costume, begins a look out for villains to fight: when Dion sees a child losing a stuffed toy, he teleports onto the street to get it, only to almost get run over by a car, which he dodges by teleporting into Nicole's arms in front of Pat, who is stunned by what he just saw.
3	3	"ISSUE #103: Watch Man"	Rachel Goldberg	Leigh Dana Jackson	October 4, 2019
4	4	"ISSUE #104: Welcome to BIONA. Hope You Survive the Experience"	Rachel Goldberg	Edward Ricourt	October 4, 2019
5	5	"ISSUE #105: Days of Mark's Future Past"	Seith Mann	Carol Barbee	October 4, 2019
6	6	"ISSUE #106: Super Friends"	Dennis Liu	Michael Poisson	October 4, 2019
7	7	"ISSUE #107: Why So Vomity?"	Neema Barnette	Kimberly Ndombe	October 4, 2019
8	8	"ISSUE #108: You Won't Like Him When He's Angry"	Neema Barnette	Teleplay by : Joshua Sternin & Jennifer Ventimilia & Edward Ricourt; Story by : Joshua Sternin & Jennifer Ventimilia	October 4, 2019
9	9	"ISSUE #109: Storm Killer"	Seith Mann	Leigh Dana Jackson and Carol Barbee	October 4, 2019

=== Season 2 (2022) ===
No. overall	No. in season	Title	Directed by	Written by	Original release date
10	1	"ISSUE #201: A Hero Returns"	Darren Grant	Carol Barbee & Leigh Dana Jackson	February 1, 2022
11	2	"ISSUE #202: Sankofa"	Darren Grant	Carol Barbee & Leigh Dana Jackson	February 1, 2022
12	3	"ISSUE #203: Monster Problem"	Dennis Liu	Edward Ricourt	February 1, 2022
13	4	"ISSUE #204: With Friends Like These"	Dennis Liu	Ryan Mottesheard	February 1, 2022
14	5	"ISSUE #205: You vs. Me"	Janice Cooke	Tanya Barfield	February 1, 2022
15	6	"ISSUE #206: 36 Good Hours"	Janice Cooke	Michael Poisson & Yvonne Hana Yi	February 1, 2022
16	7	"ISSUE #207: World Without Mom"	Bola Ogun	Carol Barbee & Leigh Dana Jackson	February 1, 2022
17	8	"ISSUE #208: Who You Are"	Bola Ogun	Carol Barbee & Leigh Dana Jackson	February 1, 2022

== Production ==
=== Development ===
On October 5, 2017, it was announced that Netflix had given the production a straight-to-series order for a first season consisting of nine episodes. The series is based on the comic book of the same name written by Dennis Liu and illustrated by Jason Piperberg. Liu then directed a short film based on his comic. Carol Barbee adapted a screenplay from the short film and comic and is the showrunner for the series. Executive producers for the series were set to include Liu, Barbee, Michael B. Jordan, Charles D. King, Kim Roth, Poppy Hanks, Kenny Goodman, and Michael Green. Production companies involved with the series were slated to consist of Outlier Society Productions and MACRO. The series premiered on October 4, 2019. On January 2, 2020, Netflix renewed the series for an eight-episode second season, which was released on February 1, 2022. In April 2022, the series was canceled.

=== Casting ===
Alongside the initial announcement of the series order, it was confirmed that Michael B. Jordan had been cast in a supporting role in the series. In June 2018, it was announced that Jason Ritter, Jazmyn Simon, Alisha Wainwright, and Ja'Siah Young had been cast as a series regulars. In July 2018, Donald Paul was cast as a recurring role in the series. On January 29, 2019, it was reported that Ali Ahn had joined the cast in a recurring capacity. On February 23, 2021, Rome Flynn, Aubriana Davis, Tracey Bonner, and Josh Ventura joined the cast undisclosed capacities while Ali Ahn and Griffin Robert Faulkner were promoted to series regulars for the second season. On August 24, 2021, Michael Anthony joined the cast in a recurring role for the second season.

=== Filming ===
Principal photography for the series began in late July 2018 in various cities and towns in Georgia including Chattahoochee Hills and Fairburn. Filming continued in the same areas in August 2018 and also took place in Midtown Atlanta at locations including the Fox Theatre. Filming for the second season began on January 25, 2021, and concluded on May 25, 2021.

== Reception ==
The review aggregation website Rotten Tomatoes reported an 83% approval rating for the series, based on 29 reviews, with an average rating of 6.8/10. The website's critics consensus reads, "While its family drama and superhero aspirations don't quite come together, compelling performances and a sense of wonder keep Raising Dion afloat and suggest that with a little more guidance it could become something great". On Metacritic, which uses a weighted average, the series was assigned a score of 61 out of 100 based on 7 critics, indicating "generally favorable reviews".

The second season was watched for over 108.75 million hours in its first 26 days on the platform according to Netflix top 10s.

== Accolades ==
The show received five nominations at the 1st Children's and Family Emmy Awards: Outstanding Children's or Family Viewing Series, Outstanding Younger Performer in a Preschool, Children's or Young Teen Program (for Young and Haney), Outstanding Stunt Coordination for a Live Action Program, and Outstanding Sound Mixing and Sound Editing for a Live Action Program. It did not win any Emmy awards.
