= Palmer (film) =

2021 American drama film

- Official release poster
- Directed by: Fisher Stevens
- Written by: Cheryl Guerriero
- Produced by: Charlie Corwin; Daniel Nadler; Charles B. Wessler; Sidney Kimmel; John Penotti
- Starring: Justin Timberlake; Juno Temple; Alisha Wainwright; June Squibb; Ryder Allen
- Cinematography: Tobias A. Schliessler
- Edited by: Geoffrey Richman
- Music by: Tamar-kali
- Production companies: Sidney Kimmel Entertainment; Nadler No-GMO Popcorn Company; Hercules Film Fund; Rhea Films
- Distributed by: Apple TV+
- Release date: January 29, 2021
- Running time: 110 minutes
- Country: United States
- Language: English
- Budget: $6.7 million

Palmer is a 2021 American drama film directed by Fisher Stevens and written by Cheryl Guerriero. The film stars Justin Timberlake, Juno Temple, Alisha Wainwright, June Squibb, and Ryder Allen. Palmer was digitally released by Apple TV+ on January 29, 2021. The film received positive reviews from critics, who praised the performances and themes though noted its familiarity.

== Plot ==
Eddie Palmer is a former high-school football star and ex-felon who has been released from prison after serving 12 years for attempted murder and armed robbery. He moves in with his grandmother Vivian, who occasionally watches over a young boy named Sam, the son of her neighbor Shelly, a drug addict.

Palmer begins working at the local school as a janitor and helps Vivian watch Sam, as Shelly repeatedly leaves town with her abusive boyfriend Jerry. After Vivian passes away, Palmer is forced to become Sam's temporary guardian until Shelly returns. Although he initially does not want anything to do with Sam, Palmer soon bonds with the boy, as he takes him to a football game at his old high school, to get a root beer float, gets him a ukulele for his birthday and teaches him how to play it, and takes Sam to a bowling fundraiser, where he strikes up a relationship with Sam’s teacher, Maggie. Palmer finds out that Vivian left her house to the church in her will, and her lawyer tells him that once the house sells, he will have 30 days to move out.

As Palmer grows closer to Maggie, he reveals to her that after a promising high school football career, he was injured in a game while playing for Louisiana State University. After losing his scholarship and dropping out of college, he returned home and became addicted to pills. One night, he decided to rob the safe of a rich family in town with the help of his friends. The house was supposed to be empty, but the owner came home and Palmer beat him nearly to death with a baseball bat. Maggie reassures Palmer that although that is who he was, he has changed and is a good man now, pointing to all the good he has done in Sam's life. They kiss and have sex.

One day, Sam comes home from a friend's house crying, with makeup garishly smeared on his face. Palmer assumes that the class bully, Toby, did it, but Sam tells him that it was Daryl, Toby’s father and a friend of Palmer's. Enraged, Palmer finds Daryl at a bar and beats him up. The next day, Shelly returns and takes Sam home. When Palmer drops Sam off at school, Sam tells him that Shelly and he are moving in with Jerry. Later that day, however, Sam is taken by Child protective services. Palmer attempts to receive full guardianship of Sam, but is denied due to his parole status and the uncertainty of his living situation. Despite Palmer's pleas, the judge orders the return of Sam to Shelly's custody. Palmer asks Shelly to appoint him Sam's legal guardian, but she scoffs at his request, even after he offers to pay her. Later, Palmer witnesses Jerry physically abusing both Shelly and Sam. Palmer intervenes and sees that both Shelly and Jerry are using drugs in front of Sam. He attacks Jerry and flees with Sam.

Shelly calls the police, and Palmer is accused of kidnapping Sam. After talking with Maggie on the phone, he brings Sam back to Shelly and is arrested at the scene. As Palmer is driven away, Sam tries to fight off the police officers and chases after the police car, crying that he wants to be with Palmer instead of his mother. Seeing Sam's love for Palmer, Shelly refuses to press charges and covers for Palmer by saying he was just taking Sam to get food, and she forgot. Shelly meets with Sam and through tears, asks him if it would be okay if he went to live with Palmer. Shelly eventually chooses to give Palmer custody of Sam. Palmer and Sam prepare for the sale of Vivian's house as they move in with Maggie.

== Cast ==
- Justin Timberlake as Eddie Palmer, a former college football star and ex-convict who spent 12 years in prison for theft and attempted murder.
- Ryder Allen as Sam Burdette, Eddie's young neighbor who becomes his surrogate son.
- Alisha Wainwright as Maggie Hayes, Sam's teacher and Eddie's love interest.
- June Squibb as Vivian Palmer, Eddie's grandmother.
- Juno Temple as Shelly Burdette, Sam's drug-addicted mother and Eddie's one-night stand.
- Jesse C. Boyd as Coles, Palmer's friend who works as a police officer.
- J.D. Evermore as Principal Forbes
- Lance E. Nichols as Sibs, Eddie's boss.
- Dean Winters as Jerry, Shelly's abusive boyfriend.
- Jay Florsheim as a Football Referee

== Production ==
The screenplay first appeared on the 2016 Black List. In September 2019, it was announced Justin Timberlake was cast to star as Eddie Palmer, with Fisher Stevens directing from a screenplay written by Cheryl Guerriero. In October 2019, Alisha Wainwright was cast, as well as Ryder Allen the following month.

Principal photography took place in New Orleans from November 9 to December 13, 2019. The film's score was composed by Tamar-kali.

== Release ==
In July 2020, Apple TV+ acquired distribution rights to the film and released it on their service on January 29, 2021.

Palmer had the second-biggest film launch for the platform, and third-biggest overall. It was also part of a 33% increase in viewership in its opening weekend, setting a new record for Apple TV+.

== Reception ==
According to review aggregator Rotten Tomatoes, 72% of 108 critic reviews were positive, with an average rating of 6.3/10. The website's critics consensus reads: "Although it traffics in familiar territory, Palmer is elevated by worthy themes and a strong ensemble led by an impressive Justin Timberlake." On Metacritic, the film has a weighted average score of 53 out of 100, based on 21 critics, indicating "mixed or average reviews".

David Ehrlich of IndieWire gave the film a grade of B− and wrote: "The little things go a long way in something this broad, and while Palmer isn't much of a tear-jerker — more of a cheek-moistener, at best — it's telling that the film's most touching moments don't stem from how Palmer and Sam have changed so much as they do from the permission they've given each other to be themselves. Palmer isn't exactly high art, but it's no small feat for something so predictable to avoid feeling dishonest."

Benjamin Lee of The Guardian gave the film two out of five stars, saying: "Despite the flashes of something more challenging, Palmer is a film content to play it safe (his true road to redemption is to slot himself into a ready-made nuclear family), a truly whelming experience that wants you to desperately feel everything from tears to joy."
