= There's Something Wrong with the Children =

2023 film by Roxanne Benjamin

- Official release poster
- Directed by: Roxanne Benjamin
- Written by: T. J. Cimfel; David White
- Produced by: Paige Pemberton; Paul Uddo
- Starring: Alisha Wainwright; Zach Gilford; Amanda Crew; Carlos Santos
- Cinematography: Yaron Levy
- Edited by: Andrew Drazek
- Music by: The Gifted
- Production company: Blumhouse Television
- Distributed by: MGM+
- Release date: January 17, 2023
- Running time: 92 minutes
- Country: United States
- Language: English

There's Something Wrong with the Children is a 2023 American horror film directed by Roxanne Benjamin and written by T. J. Cimfel and David White. The film stars Alisha Wainwright, Zach Gilford, Amanda Crew, and Carlos Santos. Jason Blum serves as an executive producer through his Blumhouse Television banner.

There's Something Wrong with the Children was released digitally in the United States on January 17, 2023.

== Plot ==
Margaret and Ben take a weekend trip with longtime friends Ellie and Thomas and their two young children, Lucy and Spencer. They stay at a campsite. The next morning, they hike through the woods and come across an old building with a cave. Lucy and Spencer are drawn to a well in the cave, seeing a green light that none of the adults seem to notice.

They return to camp and Margaret offers to watch the kids while Ellie and Thomas go on a romantic date. The children express a strong desire to return to the cave, but Margaret and Ben do not allow them to leave. The following morning, Lucy and Spencer have gone missing. Ben rushes to the cave and discovers Lucy and Spencer standing at the edge of the well before falling into it and presumably dying. Panicked, Ben returns to camp to warn the others, but discovers Lucy and Spencer running around, completely unscathed.

During lunchtime, the children act maliciously around Ben, appearing to give him bug-infested snacks and putting pills in Thomas' drink. It is revealed that Ben is taking mood stabilizers, which causes tensions to rise within the group. Ellie and Thomas accuse Ben and Margaret of being irresponsible adults to the children, much to Ben's anger as he points out their bad parenting.

Later, Spencer hits Ben with a shovel. In the struggle, Ben accidentally hits Spencer, seemingly killing him. Ellie and Thomas are overcome with grief and Lucy points at Ben, making them blame him. Ben takes Margaret to the well, convinced that the children are not who they seem, but is unable to find the bodies. Thomas is led into the woods by Lucy. Margaret realizes that Ben was telling the truth when she finds Ellie severely injured. Ellie succumbs to her wounds.

Margaret hides in the campsite. Ben is overpowered by the green light the children saw earlier. It appears he threw himself into the well like the children when he later walks into the cabin and tells Margaret that the children were right about the "shine" (the green light). He attacks Margaret when she says she does not want to become "one of them." She flees but is dragged to the cave by the children.

Margaret witnesses the children dumping Ellie's body into the pit. While they are distracted, she pushes the kids into the pit and flees. Ben tries to attack her. Thomas tackles Ben, sacrificing his life in the process. Margaret grabs the car and leaves. The children and Ben appear in the road and hold hands. Margaret slams on the gas pedal and aims her car straight at the group.

== Cast ==
- Alisha Wainwright as Margaret
- Amanda Crew as Ellie
- Carlos Santos as Thomas
- Zach Gilford as Ben
- Briella Guiza as Lucy
- David Mattle as Spencer
- Ramona Tyler as Park Ranger

== Production ==
In November 2021, There's Something Wrong with the Children was announced as part of Blumhouse Productions and Epix's movie deal, with Roxanne Benjamin directing with T. J. Cimfel & David White writing the screenplay, with Zach Gilford, Amanda Crew, Alisha Wainwright and Carlos Santos starring in the film. The opening song, titled "More", was written and sung by Sisters of Mercy.

=== Filming ===
Principal photography on the film began in November 2021 in New Orleans.

== Release ==
There's Something Wrong with the Children was released digitally and video on demand in the United States on January 17, 2023. It was released on streaming platform MGM+ on March 17, 2023.

== Reception ==
On the review aggregator website Rotten Tomatoes, 62% of 34 critics' reviews are positive, with an average rating of 5.9/10. The website's consensus reads: "Conceptually strong but uneven in execution, There's Something Wrong with the Children is a serviceable horror movie that could have been much more." On Metacritic, the film has a weighted average score of 53 out of 100, based on 7 critics, indicating "mixed or average reviews".

Christian Zilko of IndieWire gave the film a grade of A−, writing: "While it's a premise we've seen many times before, [the film] punches above its weight by doing all the little things right." Randy Myers of The Mercury News gave it 3/4 stars, saying that director Roxanne Benjamin "never allows 'Children' to overstay its welcome, resulting in a scare package worth seeking out." Meagan Navarro of Bloody Disgusting gave the film 3/5 stars, writing: "While it isn't a complete reinvention of the subgenre, it offers enough fresh ideas to set this one apart from the pack."

Brian Tallerico of RogerEbert.com gave the film 2/4 stars, saying that it "takes WAY too long to get anywhere interesting—at times, it feels like a script that would have suited an anthology format like Guillermo del Toro's Cabinet of Curiosities better than a feature's length". Noel Murray of the Los Angeles Times wrote that the children "become fairly standard-issue devil-imps, causing damage that only occasionally seems personally targeted toward the grown-ups, in scenes too blandly reminiscent of dozens of other 'cabin in the woods' movies."
