= Death of a Telemarketer =

- Directed by: Khaled Ridgeway
- Written by: Khaled Ridgeway
- Produced by: Datari Turner; James J. Yi; Meagan Good
- Starring: Lamorne Morris; Jackie Earle Haley; Haley Joel Osment; Alisha Wainwright
- Production company: Datari Turner Productions
- Distributed by: Vertical Entertainment
- Release dates: August 2020 (American Black Film Festival); December 3, 2021
- Running time: 88 minutes
- Country: United States
- Language: English

Death of a Telemarketer is a 2020 American thriller comedy-drama film written and directed by Khaled Ridgeway and starring Lamorne Morris, Jackie Earle Haley, Haley Joel Osment and Alisha Wainwright. It is Ridgeway's feature directorial debut.

== Plot ==
A fast-talking telemarketer finds himself at the mercy of a man he tried to swindle.

== Cast ==
- Lamorne Morris as Kasey Miller
- Jackie Earle Haley as Asa Ellenbogen
- Haley Joel Osment as Jim/Dean
- Alisha Wainwright as Christine
- Woody McClain as Barry
- Matt McGorry as Andy
- Gil Ozeri as Justin
- Sujata Day as Shelly
- David So as Rick
- Ian Verdun as Officer Brian Gerard
- Gwen Gottlieb as Liz
- Starletta DuPois as Mrs. Gordon

== Production ==
Filming began in Los Angeles in September 2019.

== Release ==
The film premiered at the 2020 American Black Film Festival and later showed at the 2020 Austin Film Festival in 2020.

In October 2021, it was announced that Sony Pictures Worldwide Acquisitions acquired global rights to the film.

The film was released in theaters and On Demand on December 3, 2021.

== Reception ==
The film has a 20% rating on Rotten Tomatoes based on 10 reviews, with an average rating of 4.6/10.

== Awards ==
The film won the Fan Favorite Film Award at the 2020 American Black Film Festival.

The film also won the best feature award at the 2021 Martha's Vineyard African American Film Festival.
