= Roxanne Benjamin =

American film director

- Born: Bradford, Pennsylvania, United States
- Occupations: Film director, screenwriter, film producer
- Known for: Body at Brighton Rock; There's Something Wrong with the Children; V/H/S

Roxanne Benjamin is an American film director, writer, and producer. She is best known for directing the horror films Body at Brighton Rock and There's Something Wrong with the Children and as one of the creators and producers of the V/H/S horror anthology films, having developed and produced V/H/S and V/H/S/2. She also produced the genre anthology Southbound, along with directing and writing on the film, and wrote and produced multiple segments of the anthology film XX.

== Life and career ==
Roxanne Benjamin was born and raised in Bradford, Pennsylvania. Benjamin began their filmmaking career as a producer, developing and producing genre films and anthologies, most notably V/H/S, XX, and Southbound. Benjamin is a credited producer on V/H/S and its sequel V/H/S/2 and worked on development of the third entry in the franchise before parting ways with the series to move on to directing.

Benjamin then wrote and directed segments for Southbound, a film which she also developed and produced with a number of the original V/H/S creative team. The film premiered at TIFF in the Midnight section in 2015, along with another film that Benjamin is a credited Co-producer on, The Devil's Candy. Benjamin was then brought on to the anthology feature XX, directing and writing their own segment and co-writing and producing another with artist and musician St. Vincent.

In 2016, Benjamin directed a gore-heavy horror-themed music video for indie band Cherry Glazerr's song "Nurse Ratched", featuring lead singer Clementine Creevy stalking former band member Sasami Ashworth through the woods

In 2019, Benjamin's survival thriller Body at Brighton Rock, their first solo feature film, premiered at SXSW. Their second feature film, There's Something Wrong with the Children was released in 2023 with Amazon and MGM+, with Blumhouse Productions producing.

in between the two films, Benjamin directed multiple television series focused in the genre space, including horror anthology Creepshow for Shudder, the CW's Riverdale, Chilling Adventures of Sabrina for Netflix, Nancy Drew, One of Us Is Lying, and HBO Max's Pretty Little Liars: Original Sin and Pretty Little Liars: Summer School.

In March 2019, Benjamin was hired to write the screenplay for the remake of Night of the Comet for Orion Pictures. In July 2021, Benjamin signed on to direct an American remake of the Spanish horror film La cueva titled Fall Into Darkness.

== Filmography ==
=== Film ===
Year	Title	Director	Writer	Producer	Notes
2012	V/H/S	No	No	Yes	
2013	V/H/S/2	No	No	Yes	Role as Zombie
2019	Body at Brighton Rock	Yes	Yes	Yes	
2023	There's Something Wrong with the Children	Yes	No	No	

Co-producer

- Faults (2014)
- V/H/S: Viral (2014)
- The Devil's Candy (2015)

=== Anthology segments, music videos, and commercial projects ===
Year	Title	Director	Writer	Producer	Notes
2015	Siren	Yes	Yes	Yes	Segment of Southbound; role as Claire
2016	Nurse Ratched	Yes	Yes	Yes	Cherry Glazerr music video
2017	Don't Fall	Yes	Yes	Yes	Segment of XX
2017	The Birthday Party	No	Yes – cowriter	Yes	Segment of XX
2018	Final Stop	Yes	Yes	No	Commercial project for Sennheiser

=== Television ===
Year	Title	Notes
2019	Creepshow	Episodes: "Lydia Lane's Better Half", "Skinwalkers"
2020	Riverdale	Episode: "Chapter Sixty-Seven: Varsity Blues"
2020	Chilling Adventures of Sabrina	Episode: "Chapter Twenty-Five: The Devil Within"
2021	Nancy Drew	Episodes: "The Legend of the Spider Sapphire", "The Quest for the Murder Hotel"
2022	Pretty Little Liars: Original Sin	Episode: "Chapter Nine: Dead and Buried"
2022	One of Us Is Lying	Episodes: "Simon Says You Better Pray", "Simon Says Ho, Ho, Ho"
2023	Pretty Little Liars: Summer School	2 Episodes
