= Susan Theresa Burke =

American screenwriter

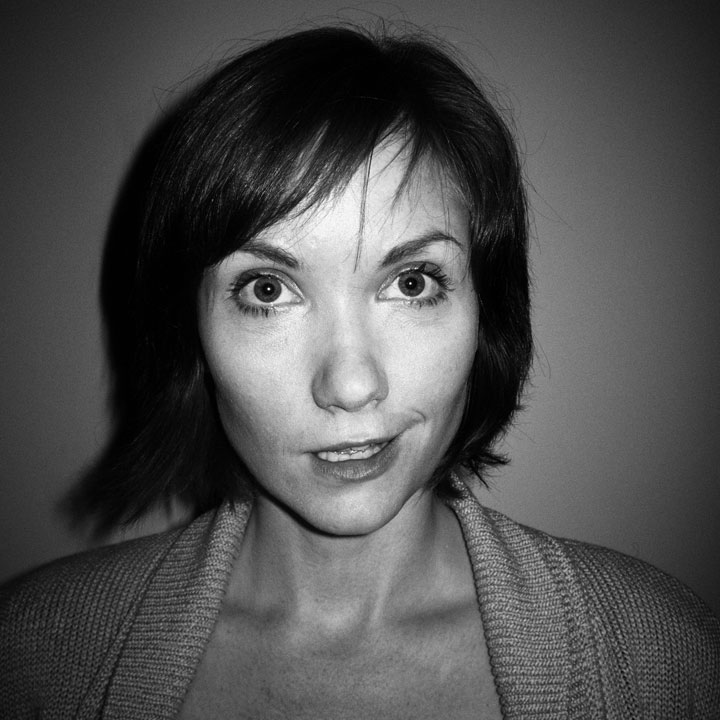
- A photo of actor/writer Susan Burke
- Born: Casper, Wyoming
- Occupations: writer, actress and stand-up comic

Susan Theresa Burke is an American writer, actress and stand-up comic. Born and raised in Casper, Wyoming, she now lives and works in Los Angeles, California. She is a frequent performer in the Los Angeles alternative comedy scene and has acted in film and television.

Burke is the co-writer of the 2012 film, Smashed, starring Mary Elizabeth Winstead and Aaron Paul. Burke co-wrote the film with director James Ponsoldt. The film is loosely based on Burke's own struggles with alcoholism and sobriety. Burke is open about getting sober at the age of 24, but most of her comedy and writing prior to Smashed has little to nothing to do with that, focusing instead on the absurdities of day-to-day life.

Burke was engaged to actor and comic Matt Peters in June 2012.
