= Clemente =

Clemente is both an Italian, Spanish and French surname and a given name. Notable people with the surname include:

== Surname ==
- Aldo Di Clemente (born 1948), Italian amateur astronomer
- Anna Clemente (born 1994), Italian racewalker
- Ari Clemente (born 1939), Brazilian footballer
- Aria Clemente (born 1995), Filipina actress and singer
- Art Clemente (1925–2021), American politician
- C. Daniel Clemente (born 1936), American attorney and businessman
- Christofer Clemente, Australian scientist
- Denis Clemente (born 1986), Puerto Rican basketball player
- Edgard Clemente (born 1975), Puerto Rican baseball player, nephew of Roberto Clemente
- Enrique Clemente (born 1999), Spanish footballer
- Fernando Clemente (1917–1998), Italian architect
- Francesco Clemente (born 1952), Italian painter
- Gerardo Clemente (born 1982), Swiss football player
- Jacob Clemente (born 1997), American actor and dancer
- Javier Clemente (born 1950), Spanish football manager
- Jim Clemente, American author and television writer and producer
- John Clemente (1926–2011) Italian physician and philatelist
- Joseph Clemente (born 1987), Indian footballer
- L. Gary Clemente (1908–1968), United States Representative from New York
- Louie Clemente (born 1965), American musician
- Ludovic Clemente (born 1986), Andorran footballer
- Manuel Clemente (born 1948), Catholic Patriarch of Lisbon
- Mariano Clemente, Argentine footballer
- Matheus Clemente (born 1998), Portuguese footballer
- Michael Clemente (1908–1987), American mobster
- Nicholas Clemente (1929–2009), American judge
- Paul Clemente, American politician
- Paulo Clemente (born 1983), Portuguese footballer
- Pia Clemente, Filipina-American film producer
- Ramón Clemente (born 1985), Puerto Rican basketball player
- Ramon di Clemente (born 1975), South African Olympic rower
- Roberto Clemente (1934–1972), Puerto Rican baseball player
- Roberto Clemente Jr. (born 1965), Puerto Rican broadcaster and former baseball player, son of Roberto Clemente
- Rosa Clemente (born 1972), American journalist and activist
- Simón de Roxas Clemente y Rubio (1777–1827), a Spanish botanist who used the standard author abbreviation Clemente
- Steve Clemente (1885–1950), Mexican-American actor
- Tim Clemente (born 1960), American counter-terrorism expert

== Given name ==
- Clemente Agosto (born 1974), Puerto Rican politician
- Clemente Aguirre (1828–1900), Mexican musician
- Clemente Alberi (1803–1864), Italian painter
- Clemente Álvarez (born 1968), Venezuelan baseball player
- Clemente Biondetti (1898–1955), Italian racing driver
- Clemente Bocciardo (1620–1658), Italian painter
- Clemente Bondi (1742–1821), Italian poet
- Clemente Canepari (1886–1966), Italian cyclist
- Clemente "Clem" Cattini (born 1937), British musician
- Clemente Cerdeira Fernández (1887–1947), Spanish Arabist and diplomat
- Clemente de Faria Jr. (born 1987), Brazilian racing driver
- Clemente Domínguez y Gómez (1946–2005), Antipope of the Palmarian Catholic Church
- Clemente Escobar Delgado (1881–1951), Chilean politician
- Clemente Estable (1894–1976), Uruguayan scientist
- Clemente Fernández López (1919–1996), Spanish footballer
- Clemente Fracassi (1917–1993), Italian film producer, director and writer
- Clemente G. Gomez-Rodriguez (born 1939), Cuban writer
- Clemente Gera (died 1643), Italian Roman Catholic bishop
- Clemente Gordon (born 1967), American football quarterback
- Clemente Gràcia (1897–1981), Spanish footballer
- Clemente 'Lello' Graziani (1925–1996), Italian neofascist politician
- Clemente Isnard (1917–2011), Brazilian Catholic bishop
- Clemente López de Osornio (1720–1783), Argentine-Spanish military leader
- Clemente Marroquín (1897–1978), Guatemalan journalist and politician
- Clemente Mejía (1928–1978), Mexican swimmer
- Clemente Micara (1879–1965), Italian Catholic cardinal
- Clemente Núñez (born 1975), Dominican baseball player
- Clemente Origo (1855–1921), Italian painter
- Clemente Ovalle (born 1982), Mexican footballer
- Clemente Palacios (born 1993), Colombian footballer
- Clemente Palma (1872–1946), Peruvian writer
- Clemente Peani (1731–1782), Catholic missionary
- Clemente Polito (died 1606), Italian Catholic bishop
- Clemente Promontorio (1340–1415), Genoese doge
- Clemente Rebora (1885–1957), Italian poet
- Clemente Rojas (born 1952), Colombian boxer
- Clemente Ruiz Nazario (1896–1969), Puerto Rican judge
- Clemente Russo (born 1982), Italian boxer
- Clemente Saavedra (born 1997), Chilean rugby union player
- Clemente Sánchez (1947–1978), Mexican boxer
- Clemente Sánchez (born 1958), American politician
- Clemente Soto Vélez (1903–1993), Puerto Rican writer and activist
- Clemente Susini (1754–1814), Italian artist and anatomist
- Clemente Tabone (c. 1575–1665), Maltese landowner and militia member
- Clemente Valencia (1968–2011), Mexican wrestler
- Clemente Villaverde (born 1959), Spanish footballer
- Clemente Yerovi (1904–1981), Ecuadoran politician

== See also ==
- Clement (disambiguation)
- Roberto Clemente Community Academy
- Roberto Clemente Award
- San Clemente (disambiguation)
