= Linder =

Linder may refer to:

== Places ==
- Linder (river), Bavaria, Germany
- Linder Peak, Antarctica
- Linder Glacier, Antarctica
- Linder Township, Greene County, Illinois
- Lakeland Linder International Airport

== People ==
=== Surname ===
- Alex Linder (born 1966), founder of Vanguard News Network
- Alice Linder, fictional character from River City
- Allan Linder (born 1966), American artist
- Anders Linder (born 1941), Swedish actor and jazz musician
- Astrid Linder, Swedish researcher in motor vehicle safety
- Béla Linder (1876–1962), Hungarian army officer and government minister
- Ben Linder (1959–1987), American engineer killed by Nicaraguan Contra rebels
- Bengt Linder (1929–1985), Swedish writer and journalist
- Cec Linder (1921–1992), Polish-born Canadian actor
- Clarence Hugo Linder (1903–1994), American electrical engineer
- David H. Linder (1899-1946), American mycologist
- Dick Linder (1923–1959), American race car driver
- Ernst Linder (1868–1943), Swedish general and Olympic gold medal horseman
- Harold F. Linder (1900–1981), banker, businessman and politician
- James Linder (born 1954), American doctor, professor and businessman
- Joe Linder (1886–1948), American ice hockey player
- John Linder (born 1942), American politician, former U.S. Representative from Georgia
- John Linder (Pennsylvania politician) (born 1947), American politician, Mayor of Chester
- Karl Linder (1900–1979), German politician
- Kate Linder (born 1947), American actress
- Krister Linder (born 1970), Swedish electronic musician
- Kurt Linder (1933–2022), German former footballer and coach
- Kurt Linder (1912−1955), Swedish film historian in whose name the Kurt Linder Scholarship was created
- Maud Linder (1924–2017), French journalist, film historian and documentary film director
- Max Linder (1883–1925), French pioneer of silent film
- Michael Linder, American radio and television journalist and producer
- Staffan Burenstam Linder (1931–2000), Swedish economist and conservative politician, twice Minister of Trade
- Virginia Linder (born 1953), Associate Justice of the Oregon Supreme Court

=== Given name ===
- Linder Sterling (born 1954), British visual and performance artist and musician known by the single name Linder

== Things ==
- A type of expensive stone referenced in the fictional children's novel Princess Academy

== See also ==
- Linder Radio Group, a media company
- Linder v. United States, a Supreme Court case
- Linder hypothesis, an economics conjecture about international trade patterns
- Lindor (disambiguation)
