= America's Most Wanted =

Television program

- Genre: Reality legal programming
- Created by: Michael Linder; Stephen Chao
- Starring: John Walsh; Elizabeth Vargas; Callahan Walsh
- Voices of: John Walsh; Ron David; Dick Ervasti; Don LaFontaine; Wes Johnson; Andrew Morgado
- Opening theme: Michael H. Shamberg (1988–1996); Gillian Gilbert & Stephen Morris (1990–1995); Anatoly Halinkovitch (1995–1996, for America's Most Wanted: Final Justice); The Runners (2009–2012); TBD (2021)
- Ending theme: Michael H. Shamberg (1988–1996); TBD (2021)
- Country of origin: United States
- Original language: English
- No. of seasons: 28
- No. of episodes: 1,102; Captures; 1,198

Production
- Executive producers: John Walsh (1988–2012, 2024–present); Michael Linder (1988–1990); Lance Heflin (1990–2012); John Ferracane (2021–present); James Bruce (2021); Jim Clemente (2021); Tim Clemente (2021); Glenn Geller (2021)
- Running time: 30 minutes (1988–1990, 1995–1996); 60 minutes (1990–1995, 1996–2012, 2021–)
- Production companies: 20th Century Fox Television (1988–2012); Walsh Productions (1988–2012); Michael Linder Productions (1988–1990); Fox Television Stations Productions (original run); XG Productions (2021); Fox Alternative Entertainment (2021–)

Original release
- Network: Fox
- Release: February 7, 1988 – June 18, 2011
- Network: Lifetime
- Release: December 2, 2011 – October 12, 2012
- Network: Fox
- Release: March 15, 2021 – present

Related
- The Hunt with John Walsh

America's Most Wanted (often abbreviated as AMW) is an American television program whose first run was produced by 20th Television, and second run is under the Fox Alternative Entertainment division of Fox Corporation. At the time of its cancellation by the Fox television network in June 2011, it was the longest-running program in the network's history (24 seasons), a mark since surpassed by The Simpsons, although the program was revived ten years later. The show started off as a half-hour program on February 7, 1988. In 1990, the show's format was changed from 30 minutes to 60 minutes. The show's format was reverted to 30 minutes in 1995, and then back to 60 minutes in 1996. A short-lived syndicated spinoff titled America's Most Wanted: Final Justice aired during the 1995–96 season.

The September following the initial 2011 cancellation, the show's host, John Walsh, announced that it would resume later that year on the cable network Lifetime, where it ran until its March 28, 2013, cancellation. This was reportedly due to low ratings and the level of royalty payments to Fox which holds the trademark and copyright. It was succeeded by John Walsh Investigates, a one-off special on Lifetime.

The show featured reenactments of dangerous fugitives that are portrayed by actors, interspersed with on-camera interviews, with Walsh in a voiceover narration. Each episode also featured photographs of dangerous fugitives, as well as a toll-free hotline number where viewers could give information at 1-800-CRIME-TV (1-800-274-6388), and they were allowed to remain anonymous. On May 2, 2008, the program's website announced its 1,000th capture. Many of the series' cases have some connection outside the United States or have not taken place in the United States at all. The series' first international capture was in Nova Scotia in 1989. With Walsh at the helm, America's Most Wanted began to broaden its scope. In addition to the regular segments narrated by Walsh, the show expanded its segments and correspondents.

The first two-hour quarterly special aired on Saturday, October 29, 2011, on Fox. The second two-hour special aired on Saturday, December 17, 2011, the third two-hour special aired on Saturday, February 11, 2012, and the fourth and final two-hour special aired on Saturday, April 21, 2012.

On July 13, 2014, a successor premiered on CNN called The Hunt with John Walsh, which added more international stories to its predecessor. The series ran until the end of its fourth season on November 19, 2017. From 2019 to 2022, Walsh hosted the Investigation Discovery series In Pursuit with John Walsh.

In January 2020, Fox announced plans to revive America's Most Wanted. The revival premiered on March 15, 2021, and was hosted by Elizabeth Vargas.

In November 2023, after a two-year hiatus, Fox announced a second season. The following month, it was announced that Walsh would be returning as host, along with his son Callahan serving as co-host. The second season premiered on January 22, 2024.

On March 25, 2025, it was announced that the show was renewed for a third season, which premiered on April 21, 2025.

== History ==
=== Conception and early airing ===
Logo used for the original Fox run

The concept for America's Most Wanted originally came from a German show, Aktenzeichen XY... ungelöst (German for File Reference XY ... Unsolved), that first aired in 1967, and the British show Crimewatch, first aired in 1984, with the US version conceived by Fox executive Stephen Chao and Executive Producer Michael Linder in the summer of 1987. Even earlier, however, CBS aired a three-month half-hour similar series hosted by Walter McGraw in the 1955–1956 season titled Wanted.

While Linder was shooting the pilot episode in Indiana, Chao and Fox attorney Tom Herwitz conducted a hurried search for a host. Chao's first choice was former police officer and best-selling author Joseph Wambaugh, but Wambaugh refused, saying he did not believe a national dragnet would work in the United States. Chao also considered asking then-recently resigned U.S. Attorney (and future New York City mayor) Rudolph Giuliani, former Virginia governor Chuck Robb and former Nebraska governor Bob Kerrey before deciding a politician might use the show as a platform for personal political ambitions. Other potential candidates included former Marine Corps Commandant General P. X. Kelly, journalists Linda Ellerbee and Bob Woodward, and victims' advocate Theresa Saldana. Then, during a marathon telephone conference call, Herwitz suggested John Walsh. Walsh had gained publicity after his six-year-old son, Adam, was kidnapped and murdered in 1981. The crime had been the subject of the 1983 television film Adam, and Walsh's later advocacy had resulted in new legislation to protect missing children, as well as the creation of the National Center for Missing and Exploited Children. After lengthy discussions, Walsh agreed to host the pilot episode.

America's Most Wanted debuted as a half-hour program on February 7, 1988, on the then-seven Fox owned and operated stations, located in New York; Los Angeles; Washington, D.C.; Houston; Chicago; Dallas; and Boston. Within four days of the first broadcast, FBI Ten Most Wanted Fugitive David James Roberts was captured as a direct result. He was a convicted killer who had recently escaped from prison by digging his way out with a small axe. This demonstrated the effectiveness of the show's "Watch Television, Catch Criminals" premise to skeptical law enforcement agencies. Ten weeks later, the program premiered nationwide on the Fox network and became the fledgling network's first hit series. In 1990, the show's format was changed from 30 minutes to 60 minutes. The show was cut back to 30 minutes in 1995, and back to 60 minutes in 1996. In 1994, an international version of the series aired on various international markets under the title Manhunter. From 1995 to 1996, a short-lived syndicated spinoff titled America's Most Wanted: Final Justice aired.

The announcer heard on the show from 2004 until his death in 2008 was well-known voice-over artist Don LaFontaine. The first new episode aired after his death was dedicated to him. He was replaced by voice actor Wes Johnson, who served in the role until end of the show's run.

Notable writers have included Peter Koper and Greg Scott.

=== Logos ===
The show's first logo ran from 1988 to 1990, which consisted of an eagle sitting on a tree branch in a circle, with lines, stars, and zigzags below, and it has "AMERICA'S MOST WANTED" written on it. The show's second and final logo ran from 1990 to 2012, which would be used for the rest of the show's run. In 1996, the show was retitled America's Most Wanted: America Fights Back, which ran until 2003. The 2021 logo utilizes the popular motif of utilizing the Stars and Stripes of the American flag as the "E" in "America's".

=== 1996 cancellation and revival ===
The program was canceled for a month and a half in the fall of 1996, per a decision made the previous spring in the wake of high production costs. In its place, Fox moved Married... with Children (then entering what soon became its final season) to 9/8c, with the new sitcom Love and Marriage following it at 9:30. Cops remained in its hour-long 8/7c block. However, protests from the public, law enforcement, and government officials, including the governors of 37 states, encouraged Fox to bring the show back, though low ratings for Married... and Love and Marriage ultimately sealed the return of AMW. Love and Marriage was canceled, and Married... was moved back to Sundays. On November 9, 1996, the show was retitled America's Most Wanted: America Fights Back, which ran until 2003. The change was overseen by Fox executive Peter Roth, who promised to bring the show back. For the next 15 years afterward, the America's Most Wanted/COPS combination made Saturday evening Fox's most stable night, along with the longest unchanged primetime schedule on American television as of 2011.

On March 6, 2010, Fox aired the 1,000th episode of America's Most Wanted, and Walsh interviewed then President Barack Obama at the White House. In the interview, they discussed the Obama Administration's crime-fighting initiatives, as well as the impact the show has had on law enforcement and crime prevention.

=== Covering criminals in the war on terrorism ===
The show expanded its focus so it could also cover criminals in the war on terrorism when, on October 12, 2001, an episode which featured 22 most-wanted al-Qaeda operatives was aired. The show was put together due to a request by White House aides after the same list of men had been released to the nation two days earlier. However, the first show that focused mainly on terrorism aired after the September 11 attacks and was two hours long.

=== From Fox to Lifetime ===
On May 16, 2011, Fox Entertainment President Kevin Reilly announced that after 23 years, America's Most Wanted, in its weekly format, would be canceled. The final weekly episode aired on June 18, 2011, though Reilly said four two-hour specials would air on Fox in the fall 2011 television season. However, Walsh said he was looking to other networks to keep the show going, saying he had "many, many offers" from other networks. Fox News Channel confirmed that its chairman Roger Ailes had been in preliminary discussions with Walsh about bringing the show to Fox News, but said "nothing has been decided." On the final Fox episode, Walsh promised to continue the show elsewhere and told the Associated Press: "I want to catch bad guys and find missing children—and we're not done."

During the 2010–2011 season, the show averaged an audience of five million. Within hours of Fox's announcement of the show's cancellation, campaigns to save the show were started by fans through Facebook and Twitter, among other social networking sites.

In September 2011, it was announced that Lifetime had picked up America's Most Wanted from Fox and it began airing on the former on December 2, 2011. On March 13, 2012, Lifetime ordered an additional 20 episodes. However, on March 28, 2013, it was announced that Lifetime had cancelled America's Most Wanted.

=== 2021 revival ===
In January 2021, Fox announced that it would revive America's Most Wanted, with a new host Elizabeth Vargas, with the full endorsement of John Walsh, who could appear if contractual requirements with Discovery for his series In Pursuit are relaxed. The revival premiered on March 15, 2021, and included augmented reality components to show a person's profile in full, including a full-body render of suspects or missing children, as they were last seen or artificially aged, along with identifying features such as scars and tattoos. The toll-free number for tips changed to 833-3AMWTIP (833-326-9847) (The number was eventually changed to 833-AMW-TIPS (833-269-8477) when the Walshes took back over from Vargas.), and the website changed to AMWTips.com, as opposed to AMW.com; though the latter domain has remained under Fox's control since 1997. Tipsters' identities were anonymous and, as always, were eligible for a cash reward for information leading to the apprehension of criminal(s) involved. An extension series hosted by Nancy Grace, America's Most Wanted Overtime, was also carried on the Fox Nation streaming service.

It was announced in December 2023 that John Walsh would return as host of America's Most Wanted, with his son Callahan Walsh serving as co-host.

The second season premiered on January 22, 2024 to 2.16 million viewers. Elizabeth Smart, whose 2002 kidnapping was broadcast on the original show, appeared as a guest to discuss child abduction.

On March 25, 2025, it was announced that the show was renewed for a third season, which premiered on April 21, 2025.

The current tip hotline is 1-866-AMW-TIPS (1-866-269-8477)

== AMW Dirty Dozen ==
The AMW Dirty Dozen was John Walsh's list of notorious fugitives who had been profiled on the show who were at that time, still at large. It was similar in function, though not identical with, the FBI Ten Most Wanted Fugitives list; four of the Dirty Dozen were on the FBI's list.

These are the Dirty Dozen, as of January 8, 2013. Currently, there are 8 fugitives still wanted despite the idea of the list being John Walsh's 12 personal most wanted. The eleventh, Andre Neverson was arrested in 2018. Paul Jackson was arrested in 2015. Resort killer Beacher Ferrel Hackney was removed after his body was discovered in September 2012. Alleged murderer William Joseph Greer has also been removed from Walsh's Dirty Dozen before despite him seemingly still on the run.

- Jason Derek Brown is wanted for the murder of an armored car driver and robbery of $56,000 in front of a movie theater in Phoenix, Arizona, on November 29, 2004. He is charged in Phoenix with first-degree murder and unlawful flight to avoid prosecution. He is believed to be in either British Columbia, or Mexico. On December 8, 2007, Brown was added to the FBI's Ten Most Wanted List. On September 7, 2022, he was removed from the Ten Most Wanted list without being captured, but he is still wanted.
- Jose Fernando Corona is wanted out of Lewisville, Texas for brutally murdering his wife with a chainsaw on April 26, 2010. The murder has shaken the quiet community to the core, particularly his daughter with whom he was close. Despite no criminal record, the otherwise mild-mannered father of six had a nervous breakdown and carried out this grisly act that was considered atypical of his character. Corona has since been on the run from the law, possibly being hidden by friends.
- Berny Figueroa is wanted for the murder of two-year-old Alexia Lopez in Brenham, Texas. On March 11, 2008, Figueroa punched Lopez in the stomach, separating her large and small intestines at the daycare facility where she worked.
- Robert Fisher is wanted for the murder of his wife, Mary, and his children, Brittany and Bobby Jr. in Scottsdale, Arizona, on April 10, 2001, and then burning down their house to try to cover up the crime. He was also on the FBI's Ten Most Wanted List (until his removal in November 2021) and is considered to be AMW's Public Enemy Number 1.
- Alexis Flores is wanted for the kidnapping and murder of five-year-old Iriana DeJesus in Philadelphia, Pennsylvania, in July 2000. The DNA Match returned in March 2007. Flores was also placed on the FBI Ten Most Wanted Fugitives list on June 2, 2007. On March 6, 2025, he was removed from the Ten Most Wanted list without being captured, but he is still wanted. Flores was captured in February 2026.
- Francisco Javier Lopez Gonzalez is wanted for the murder of his step son.
- Elby Hars was wanted for sexually abusing young girls in Columbia, South Carolina. He had previously served time for sexually abusing his own daughter, Terri Hars. When he was released, he found young girls to abuse, leading to him going to prison.
- Daniel Hiers is wanted for the murder of his wife, Ludimila Hiers, in Goose Creek, South Carolina, in March 2005. He is also wanted for sexually abusing a child in Charleston, South Carolina, shortly before. Hiers, a former police officer, is on the U.S. Marshals 15 Most Wanted List, and they are offering a $10,000 reward for information leading to his capture. Hiers was arrested in 2018 in Shanghai, China after being on the run for 13 years. Eight years later, he was extradited back to South Carolina.
- Paul Erven Jackson and sibling Vance Roberts were believed by police to have lured teenage girls to a homemade sex-torture chamber they built in the residence they once shared in Hillsboro, Oregon. While Roberts turned himself in and was sentenced to 108 years in prison, Jackson escaped in June 1990 and was on the run until September 2015. On September 28, 2015, he was arrested by immigration officials in Guadalajara, Mexico, where Jackson appeared to have been living for years using an alias. He was transported back to the U.S. and is currently awaiting trial on kidnapping charges in Hillsboro.
- Andre Neverson is wanted for the murders of his sister, Patricia Neverson, and his ex-girlfriend, Donna Davis, both in Brooklyn, New York, in July 2002. He is also on the U.S. Marshals 15 Most Wanted list. Neverson was captured on September 4, 2018.
- Yaser Abdel Said was wanted for shooting his two teenage daughters to death in an "honor killing" on January 1, 2008, in Irving, Texas. He was also wanted for questioning in the girls' sexual abuse nearly a decade prior. He was added to the FBI's Ten Most Wanted List on December 4, 2014. On August 26, 2020, Said was captured in Justin, Texas.

== Presumption of innocence ==
Given that a significant number of the fugitives on America's Most Wanted had yet to face trial in a criminal court, the show adhered to the presumption of innocence as afforded under the law. For this reason, in the cases where fugitives had not yet been convicted, John Walsh would always precede his narrative of the crime with either the terms "Police say...", "According to police...", or other such similar terms followed by a description of the crime to which the person had allegedly committed.

In a handful of rare cases, America's Most Wanted profiled persons who were involved in controversial cases or who had fled to avoid prosecution on what they believed to be unfair or even framed charges. One female fugitive, who had fled to Canada, later had charges against her dismissed even after being profiled on the show. In another case, a judge ordered a change of venue for a suspected child murderer after learning that nearly the entire county had seen the suspect profiled on America's Most Wanted and believed him guilty. During its entire run, Walsh refused to ever issue a retraction, and never updated viewers on any fugitives who were later found not guilty of the crimes to which they had been profiled.

== Timeline ==
- 1988: America's Most Wanted debuted as a half-hour program on Fox, with David James Roberts as the show's first fugitive. This first year the show made possible the location and capture of Denice Stumpner, one of the killers of Margaret Anderson.
- 1989: The show marks its first international capture from Nova Scotia.
- 1990: The 100th episode of America's Most Wanted airs. The show moved to Friday nights at 9:00e/8:00c. The show introduced a brand new logo, and the format changed from 30 minutes to 60 minutes. Original executive producer Michael Linder leaves the show, and Lance Heflin became executive producer.
- 1992: The 200th episode of America's Most Wanted airs.
- 1994: The 300th episode of America's Most Wanted airs. The show moved to Saturday nights at 9:00e/8:00c.
- 1995: The show's format changed back to 30 minutes. America's Most Wanted: Final Justice debuts in first-run syndication.
- 1996: The 400th episode of America's Most Wanted airs. America's Most Wanted: Final Justice ends. The show's format changed back to 60 minutes, and was retitled America's Most Wanted: America Fights Back, which stayed until 2003.
- 1998: The 500th episode of America's Most Wanted airs.
- 2000: The 600th episode of America's Most Wanted airs.
- 2002: The 700th episode of America's Most Wanted airs.
- 2003: The show was reverted to America's Most Wanted, which would be used for the rest of the show's run.
- 2005: The 800th episode of America's Most Wanted airs.
- 2006: The 900th episode of America's Most Wanted airs.
- 2010: The 1,000th episode of America's Most Wanted airs.
- 2011: The last episode of America's Most Wanted airs on Fox. The show moved from Fox to Lifetime on Friday nights, which stayed until the end of the series in 2012.
- 2021: The first episode of the revival series, hosted by investigative journalist Elizabeth Vargas, debuts on Fox.
- 2024: John Walsh returned as host in the second season of the reboot on Fox and Fox Nation, alongside his son, Callahan, joining as co-host.
- 2025: The 1,100th episode of America’s Most Wanted airs.

== See also ==
- Aktenzeichen XY... ungelöst, a similar program in Germany, Austria and Switzerland.
- Australia's Most Wanted, an inspired program in Australia.
- Crimewatch, a similar program in the United Kingdom.
- Cops, usually aired back-to-back with America's Most Wanted on Fox.
- Efterlyst, a similar program in Sweden.
- India's Most Wanted, an inspired program in India.
- Linha Direta, a similar program in Brazil.
- Ten 7 Aotearoa, a similar program in New Zealand.
- Police Report, a similar program in Hong Kong.
- The Hunt with John Walsh, a similar program which Walsh also hosts.
- Unsolved Mysteries, a similar program.
