= NCIS: Los Angeles season 1 =

NCIS: Los Angeles
- Season 1
- Season 1 U.S. DVD cover
- Starring: Chris O'Donnell; Peter Cambor; Daniela Ruah; Adam Jamal Craig; Linda Hunt; LL Cool J; Barrett Foa
- No. of episodes: 24

Release
- Original network: CBS
- Original release: September 22, 2009 – May 25, 2010

Season chronology
- ← Previous; Introductory episodes Next → Season 2

The first season of the American television series NCIS: Los Angeles premiered on CBS on September 22, 2009, and concluded on May 25, 2010. It is the first spin-off series of NCIS. The series is set in Los Angeles, California, and follows the stories of the members of the Office of Special Projects, an undercover division of the Naval Criminal Investigative Service (NCIS). The show and its characters were introduced during the sixth-season episodes of NCIS titled "Legend (Part I)" and "Legend (Part II)." These episodes served as a backdoor pilot for the series.

Season one was originally planned to have thirteen episodes. On October 7, 2009, after rating as the most watched new show of the Fall 2009 U.S. television season, CBS ordered a full set of 22 episodes, which was extended to 24 episodes on November 4, 2009.

NCIS: Los Angeles ranked as the #9 most watched series for the 2009-10 U.S. TV season with a total of 16.08 million viewers.

== Cast and characters ==
=== Main ===
- Chris O'Donnell as G. Callen, NCIS Senior Special Agent (SSA) for the Office of Special Projects (O.S.P.) in Los Angeles
- Peter Cambor as Dr. Nate Getz, NCIS Operational Psychologist and Special Agent
- Daniela Ruah as Kensi Blye, NCIS Junior Field Agent
- Adam Jamal Craig as Dominic Vail, NCIS Junior Field Agent
- Barrett Foa as Eric Beale, NCIS Technical Operator
- Linda Hunt as Henrietta Lange, NCIS SSA and Operations Manager of the O.S.P.
- LL Cool J as Sam Hanna, NCIS Senior Field Agent, second in command

=== Recurring ===
- Eric Christian Olsen as Marty Deeks, LAPD Detective
- Rocky Carroll as Leon Vance, NCIS Director stationed in Washington, D.C.
- Kathleen Rose Perkins as Rose Schwartz, M.E Doctor in Los Angeles
- Pauley Perrette as Abigail Sciuto, Forensic Specialist for NCIS in D.C. (Special Guest from NCIS)
- Brian Avers as Mike Renko, NCIS Special Agent and former member of the O.S.P. and Callen's team
- Ronald Auguste as Mohad "Moe" Dusa
- Vyto Ruginis as Arkady Kolcheck

=== Guest appearances ===
- Kelly Hu as Lee Wuan Kai, NCIS target
- David Dayan Fisher as Trent Kort, CIA Agent
- Brandon Scott as Marine LCPL. Alex Walder

== Episodes ==
No. overall	No. in season	Title	Directed by	Written by	Original release date	Prod. code	U.S. viewers (millions)
1	1	"Identity"	James Whitmore Jr.	Shane Brennan	September 22, 2009	101	18.73
Having successfully recovered from his near-fatal shooting (at the end of the pilot episodes "Legend (Parts I & II)"), Callen rejoins the Office of Special Projects (OSP) team whose headquarters have since moved to a new location. His first case back involves Navy Commander Frank McGuire who was kidnapped and eventually killed in a shootout between members of a drug cartel and the LAPD. The team soon discovers that the commander's actions might have jeopardized a highly classified military operation that monitors drug cartels in Mexico. Complicating matters, his wife Helen (Note: Clare Carey as Helen McGuire) hides the fact that the life of his young niece Emma Perez (Note: Ariel Gade as Emma Perez) has been put in great danger. The team races against the clock to find and save Emma before it's too late, with a little help from a private military contractor, Bobby J. Jenlow. (Note: Mathew St. Patrick as Bobby J. Jenlow) But all is not what it seems, especially concerning Emma's father, Luis Perez. (Note: Alex Fernandez as Luis Perez)
2	2	"The Only Easy Day"	Terrence O'Hara	R. Scott Gemmill	September 29, 2009	102	17.40
Sam is left feeling betrayed when he learns that a military-style heist on a drug dealer was carried out by former Navy SEALs Morris Raspen (Note: Brian Gross as Navy Seal Morris Raspen) and Kurt Holgate (Note: Matt Battaglia as Kurt Holgate) who Sam himself trained, initiated by Navy SEAL Jackson as a way to support Gail Ramirez (Note: Seidy López as Gail Ramirez) who was widowed when her husband was gunned down by dealers at a convenience store. One dealer is killed, but Coroner Rose Carlyle discovers another one of the slain "dealers" is actually an undercover LAPD detective. Sam is then confronted by the slain officer's partner, LAPD Det. Douglas Grozen. (Note: Rod Rowland as LAPD Detective Douglas Grozen) The team must then find a way to apprehend Raspen and Holgate, and take down a dirty cop who is after the stolen money. Note: The episode title is shorten version of the SEAL motto, "The Only Easy Day was Yesterday."
3	3	"Predator"	Tony Wharmby	Dave Kalstein	October 6, 2009	104	16.31
During a Marine Corps training exercise, Air Force Captain Mark Holden Briggs (Note: Warren Kole as Air Force Capt. Mark Holden Briggs) inexplicably loses control over an MQ-1 Predator armed with two Hellfire missiles, one of which fires, killing a Marine. To retrieve the hijacked Predator, the team is forced to step into the hacker underworld before the aircraft falls into enemy hands and puts the entire country at risk from rogue missile attacks.
4	4	"Search and Destroy"	Steve Boyum	Gil Grant	October 13, 2009	105	15.38
A mentally unstable Iraq war veteran, former Marine Walton Monroe Flynn, (Note: Chris Tardio as Walton Flynn) arrives in L.A. and his actions trigger a series of killings. Director Vance tasks the OSP team with capturing Flynn. They start by contacting Flynn's employer, Citdential Security CEO Peter Caldwell. (Note: Jonathan Adams as Peter Caldwell) A lead to Flynn's girlfriend Cherise "Cherry" Dawson is obtained from tattoo artist Delores. (Note: Fay Wolf as Delores) When a stake-out of Delores' home fails, Callen interviews with UltraSoft manager, Adriano Carlson (Note: Jay Malone as Adriano Carlson) to get close to Cherry. Citdential, having its own deadly agenda muscles in, threatening the case.
5	5	"Killshot"	David M. Barrett	Shane Brennan	October 20, 2009	103	16.48
DARPA-funded defense contractor Daniel Su is murdered by a sniper while on a jet-ski, and the team fears that his top-secret classified software is lost until they find a suspect; North Korean assassin Lee Wuan Kai, (Note: Kelly Hu as Lee Wuan Kai) who has previous, haunting connections to Director Vance. Vance calls in help from NCIS Forensic Specialist Abby Sciuto when the body of Sally Morris turns up at Daniel's home, while Callen and Sam meet with DARPA analyst Frank Davis (Note: Michael Marisi Ornstein as Frank Davis) for details of Daniel's project, which began prior to his defection from North Korea. The team must then protect Daniel's brother Jimmy Su (Note: Kelvin Yu as Jimmy Su) and Jimmy's wife Aimee (Note: Kathleen Munroe as Aimee Su) when Kai targets them. Rookie Agent Dominic Vail goes on an undercover assignment for the first time to investigate Jimmy's possible involvement in Sally's murder and Daniel's project. After a shoot out, Kai, badly wounded, escapes. Note: This episode begins a crossover event that concludes on the NCIS Season 7 episode "Endgame".
6	6	"Keepin' It Real"	Leslie Libman	Matt Pyken	November 3, 2009	106	15.29
A Marine corporal is found dead after dropping from the top of a high rise apartment building. The LAPD think it to be suicide, but NCIS is brought in and soon figure out that he was murdered. As they investigate the death, a major counterfeiting ring is uncovered and a Secret Service agent arrives to help them with the case despite the team's best efforts to brush her off. Cast: Monet Mazur, Mark Rolston, Brandon Scott, Rachael Carpani, Tyler Jacob Moore
7	7	"Pushback"	Paris Barclay	Shane Brennan	November 10, 2009	107	16.23
A range of surveillance photos found on the body of a murdered woman has the team tackling the cold case of Callen's near-fatal shooting several months ago. They eventually set up a very dangerous assignment: to find out who ordered for Callen to be killed and to also bring his would-be murderer to justice. Cast: Charles Esten, Andrew Rothenberg
8	8	"Ambush"	Rod Holcomb	Lindsay Sturman	November 17, 2009	108	14.87
While Hetty is attending a Senate hearing in D.C., the investigation of a murdered Marine Lance Corporal leads the NCIS team to stolen anti-tank missiles and a dangerous militia group which Special Agent Mike Renko has been investigating and as such, both Callen and Sam are caught in the middle. Cast: Michael Reilly Burke, Brian Letscher, Richard Brake
9	9	"Random on Purpose"	Steven DePaul	Speed Weed	November 24, 2009	109	17.22
When a Navy engineer is murdered, the team believe that international espionage might be the motive for his death but they're in for a shock when NCIS: D.C. Forensic Scientist Abigail Sciuto arrives travels to Los Angeles with information suggesting that a possible serial killer, one she calls the Phantom is responsible. She also claims that what makes him so unique is his M.O. which is that his killings are totally random with no repeats and that the killer himself also leaves no physical evidence of any kind behind. However, when Abby herself is kidnapped after spending the evening at a bar with Eric, Callen and the team find themselves racing against the clock to save Abby's life and stop the murderer before it's too late. Cast: Kris Lemche, Sean Wing, Dawn Stern, Tanya Clarke
10	10	"Brimstone"	Terrence O'Hara	Teleplay by : R. Scott Gemmill & Gil Grant; Story by : R. Scott Gemmill	December 15, 2009	110	17.50
A trio of Marine veterans are targeted by a bomber with one of them dying as a result of his cell-phone exploding and the evidence leads the team to a disfigured ex-serviceman who's been fingered for murder in Iraq. Cast: Assaf Cohen
11	11	"Breach"	Perry Lang	Teleplay by : Shane Brennan & R. Scott Gemmill; Story by : R. Scott Gemmill	January 5, 2010	111	18.07
When a petty officer is murdered, the team discover a plot at a strip club that involves intelligence secrets which are being extorted and presumably sold. Meanwhile, a vulnerable young friend of Sam's is unknowingly recruited by an Islamic militant. Cast: JR Bourne, Josh Kelly
12	12	"Past Lives"	Elodie Keene	Dave Kalstein	January 12, 2010	112	15.60
One of Callen's old aliases is brought back to life as he prepares to investigate the shooting of a sailor and in the process, he uncovers a shocking secret from his past. Cast: Jeffrey Pierce, Kenny Johnson, Audrey Marie Anderson, Michael Irby, David Monahan
13	13	"Missing"	David M. Barrett	Gil Grant & Matt Pyken	January 26, 2010	113	16.94
Hetty receives an "agent needs assistance" alert from Special Agent Dom Vail. LAPD Detective Dan Evans reports there were no witnesses. NCIS takes the onboard video hard drive from Dom's blood-spattered, bullet-ridden car. Kensi and Nate check Dom's home, finding garage video revealing someone placing a wireless camera, indicating that professions had been planning Dom's abduction for several days. Eric reports Dom's phone has been turned back on. At its location, NCIS finds a dead man, realizing the blood was probably not Dom's. Ty (Note: Parry Shen as Ty) recovers car audio, hearing the name Rafael. Eric identifies the dead man as Frederico Gomez, leading NCIS to his accomoplices, Columbian national kidnappers-for-hire Rafael (Note: Maurice Compte as Rafael Taro) and Jose Taro. They also locate their sister Claudia, the nurse who treated Frederico's gunshot wounds. They detain Claudia and plan to exchange her for Dom. A shoot-out with the Taro brothers ensues at an abandoned hospital. Dying, Rafael reveals where they left Dom, bargaining for Claudia's immunity. NCIS rushes to the location, but find that Dom had already been taken by a third party. Callen files his report, classifying motive as "unknown" and Dom's status as "missing."
14	14	"LD50"	Jonathan Frakes	Speed Weed & R. Scott Gemmill	February 2, 2010	114	16.42
The agents discover that a biochemical weapons expert suffering from Alzheimer's disease was tricked into producing a deadly toxin for an arms dealer. When Sam goes undercover to the auction they learn that there will be a demonstration of the weapon in a Los Angeles mall, and the team must hurry to stop it. Cast: Julianna McCarthy, Andrew Connolly, JR Bourne, Dameon Clarke
15	15	"The Bank Job"	Terrence O'Hara	Dave Kalstein	February 9, 2010	115	17.91
While attempting to open a security deposit box at a bank, armed robbers hold hostages and then start battling with Special Agent Kensi Blye, leading to her being shot in the chest. The events of the day before are revisited, revealing that Kensi's injuries are not as they seem and neither are the robbers. Cast: Devon Sawa, Brian Goodman, Mac Brandt, Scott Alan Smith, Ian Harding
16	16	"Chinatown"	Alan J. Levi	Lindsay Sturman	March 2, 2010	116	14.84
The team suspects that the death of a naval officer ruled as a suicide could be a murder, and that the crime implies a possible threat to national security. And things get worse when it's discovered that the victim was actually a spy working for the Chinese government with technology capable of compromising an important mission he was due to embark on before his suicide. This revelation leads the team to a rogue sleeper cell and they must save the victim's family before it's too late. Cast: Tzi Ma, Elizabeth Sung, James Harvey Ward
17	17	"Full Throttle"	David M. Barrett	Joseph C. Wilson	March 9, 2010	117	17.00
The team investigates the death of a sailor who died in an underground street race, and they find that his car was sabotaged, resulting in it later exploding, killing the sailor. Meanwhile, having been caught speeding again, Callen, on Hetty's orders and much to his own dismay, is forced to go to traffic school while the rest of the team handle the case. Cast: Dichen Lachman, Scout Taylor-Compton, Jake McLaughlin, Walter Perez, Lew Temple, David Andriole, Helena Mattsson
18	18	"Blood Brothers"	Karen Gaviola	Tim Clemente	March 16, 2010	118	15.10
A Marine is killed in a gang-related drive-by shooting, and the team fears his younger brother may also be targeted. They soon uncover evidence of an operation smuggling automatic weapons which are being taken from the Iraqi battlefields and placed into the hands of a local street gang. Cast: Sticky Fingaz, Paul James
19	19	"Hand-to-Hand"	Paris Barclay	Matt Pyken	April 6, 2010	119	13.79
The investigation of an ex-marine's murder leads the team to a mixed martial arts gym, where Sam must go undercover. The team soon realize they've stumbled into an LAPD Case, and meet LAPD Detective Marty Deeks while he's undercover. The investigation becomes a joint operation. Cast: Matt Gerald, Dayo Ade, Winston Story
20	20	"Fame"	Dennis Smith	Speed Weed	April 27, 2010	120	15.62
Recruited by Hetty, Detective Marty Deeks officially joins the team as the NCIS/LAPD liaison officer. The death of a marine leads the team to Hollywood glitz and glamor in search of a young girl who may or may not be responsible for the marine's death and a series of high-society home invasions. At the end of the episode, Deeks leaves to go undercover on an LAPD op but promises to return. Cast: Bernard White, Faran Tahir, Cherilyn Wilson, Brook Kerr
21	21	"Found"	James Whitmore Jr.	R. Scott Gemmill	May 4, 2010	121	14.34
Months after events in "Missing" jihadists upload video demanding the release their captured leader Ala a Din Keshwar within twenty-four hours or they will behead Dom. Hetty contacts a mysterious man (Note: Daniel Hugh Kelly as Man) who provides a Talib al Jihadiya training video. Hanna recognizes Mohad "Moe" Dusa (from "Breach") who was recruited by Safar Jadallah from the Ethiopian Youth Organization, where they capture Yari. Kensi discovers that their administrator Ameenah Shah resigned from the youth center in protest. Ameenah reveals Kalil Abramson (Note: Carlo Rota as Kalil Abramson) taught after Safar was arrested, but Abramson "lawyers-up" when confronted. In interrogation, Callen resorts to "extreme measures," faking the drowning of a "suspect" (who is actually Agent Nassir) to scare Yari into admitting that it was Abramson who paid the Colombians to abduct Dom. Meanwhile, Dom attacks his captors, destroying their camera, thus delaying their execution video. Dom eventually convinces Moe to help him escape. The team follows Abramson into a theatre. Dom emerges onto the roof, finding he is still in Los Angeles. Jihadists fire at Dom, alerting the team, leading to a shoot out in which both Dom and Abramson are killed.
22	22	"Hunted"	Steven DePaul	Corey Miller	May 11, 2010	122	16.04
Ethan and Randy capture video of an airfield shootout which frees jihadist leader Ala a Din Keshwar from Army custody, leaving several dead, including a conspirator and pilot Mike Pierce. Army CID Maj. Rick Medina (Note: Yancey Arias as Army CID Major Rick Medina) directs OSP to airport operations manager Susan Brosnan, (Note: April Parker-Jones as Susan Brosnan) who provides Pierce's address, where they find his wife Linda (Note: Nondumiso Tembe as Linda Pierce) shot, having been held captive to ensure Mike's compliance. Eric locates Mohad Dusa for questioning. Kensi finds Mike's flight plan to Mexico, indicating Keshwar needs a new exfiltration plan. Eric finds the van Keshwar used to escape, but jihadists detonate it, faking Keshwar's martyrdom. Moe recognizes fellow youth center recruits in the van, but mentions Tariq Hassan, one of the shooters at the airport, was not one of them. The team deduces, Brosnan "rubber-stamped him in...looked the other way." They surmise Keshwar will leave the same way Moe entered – a Turkish cargo ship. After shooting several jihadi guards, they find Medina already holding Keshwar in custody. Callen calls to confirm, but Vance never told Medina which ship. Confronted, Medina draws his gun, forcing them to kill him. Meanwhile, Hetty hands Vance her resignation letter, but Callen pickpockets it, convincing Hetty to remain OSP's Operational Manager.
23	23	"Burned"	Steve Boyum	Teleplay by : Gil Grant & Dave Kalstein; Story by : Dave Kalstein	May 18, 2010	123	15.32
Callen's cover is blown and at the same time the NCIS OSP's computers are hacked, forcing the team to go off the grid for the time being. The team struggles to get back on its feet while at the same time investigating the source of the security breach which is later revealed to have come from a shadowy intelligence dealer who has ties to an Eastern European mafia group. Cast: Peter Wingfield, Steve Bacic, Gregory Alan Williams
24	24	"Callen, G."	Tony Wharmby	Shane Brennan	May 25, 2010	124	13.23
The NCIS team races against the clock to stop a brutal and murderous cabal who are hellbent on launching nuclear war in the Middle East while Callen finds himself embarking on a very personal and possibly the most dangerous mission of his entire career so far- to find the woman who might hold the answers to his true identity and past. Cast: David Dayan Fisher, Eli Danker, Nancy Linehan Charles, Jacqueline McKenzie

== Production ==
=== Crew ===
The first season was produced by CBS Television Studios and Shane Brennan Productions and aired on the CBS network. The series was created by Shane Brennan as a spin-off from NCIS, which was created by Donald P. Bellisario. Brennan and R. Scott Gemmill served as executive producers. The writers were Brennan, Gemmill, Dave Kalstein, Gil Grant, Speed Weed, Lindsay Sturman, Tim Clemente, Joseph C. Wilson, and Matt Pyken. Brennan served as the season's showrunner.

=== Casting ===
The first season had 7 actors get star billing. Chris O'Donnell portrayed G. Callen, an NCIS Special Agent in charge of the Office of Special Projects team in Los Angeles. Though his friends call him "G" he does not know what his first name is. LL Cool J portrays Sam Hanna, a former Navy SEAL working as a Senior NCIS agent. Sam is G's partner and is very curious about his past. Kensi Blye portrayed by Daniela Ruah, a Junior Field agent on the NCIS Office of Special Projects who comes from a Marine family, studied forensics and criminology in college, and is fluent in Portuguese, lip reading, and Morse code. Adam Jamal Craig portrayed Dominic "Dom" Vail, the team's rookie agent. After his character disappeared in the episode "Missing" he was changed to a guest star. He was written out of the show in the episode "Found" when Dom was fatally wounded while trying to escape from his kidnappers. Peter Cambor portrayed Dr. Nathaniel "Nate" Getz, the operational psychologist working with NCIS observing surveillance tapes and watching or conducting interrogations in order to create psychological profiles of suspects. Nate briefly expressed interest in doing field work but was dissuaded by everyone on the team. Barrett Foa portrayed Eric Beale, the technical operator for the OSP who serves as the primary contact both for agents in the field and with Director Leon Vance. Foa was changed from guest starring to a starring role as of the thirteenth episode of the season. Linda Hunt portrayed Henrietta "Hetty" Lange, the Operations Manager at NCIS in Los Angeles. Hetty has been compared to the character Q in the James Bond novels and films. She guest-starred in the first episode before being upgraded as a series regular the following episode.

Rocky Carroll had a recurring role as Leon Vance, the Director of NCIS.

Brian Avers appeared in three episodes as Special Agent Mike Renko; Pauley Perrette appeared in two episodes as Abby Sciuto, the forensic specialist at NCIS headquarters. Eric Christian Olsen guest starred in two episodes as Marty Deeks, the NCIS / LAPD Liaison Officer.

== Reception ==
=== Critical response ===
NCIS: Los Angeles' first season received mixed-to-positive reviews from television critics. On Rotten Tomatoes, the season holds a 70% approval rating based on 30 reviews, with an average rating of 5.4/10. The site's critic consensus reads: "Much like the original, NCIS: Los Angeles employs high-tech gadgetry, likeable characters, and tight pacing, with similarly successful results."

=== Awards and nominations ===
Year	Association	Category	Nominee(s)	Result	Ref.
2010	People's Choice Awards	Favorite New TV Drama	–	Nominated	
2010	Teen Choice Awards	Choice Action Show	–	Won	
2010	Teen Choice Awards	Choice Actor Action	LL Cool J	Nominated	
2010	Teen Choice Awards	Choice Actress Action	Daniela Ruah	Nominated	
2010	Golden Globes (Portugal)	Revelation	Daniela Ruah	Won	

=== Ratings ===
The series premiere, "Identity", attracted approximately 18.73 million viewers and earned a 4.4/11 Nielsen rating/share among adults aged 18–49, making it the most-watched program in its timeslot. It ranked as the second most-watched television program of the week, behind only the seventh-season premiere of sister series NCIS, which drew 20.61 million viewers. The premiere also outperformed the seventh-season premiere of CSI: Miami, which had premiered the same date during the previous television season, as well as the series premiere of The Mentalist, which occupied the same slot during the 2008–09 television season.

Following its debut, the series maintained strong viewership throughout much of the season. The eleventh episode, "Breach", was the second most-watched episode of the season with 18.07 million viewers, while the fifteenth episode, "The Bank Job", ranked third with 17.91 million viewers. Although ratings gradually declined during the latter half of the season, the series consistently remained one of CBS's highest-rated freshman dramas. The season finale, "Callen, G.", attracted 13.23 million viewers, marking the season's lowest audience.

Over the course of its first season, NCIS: Los Angeles averaged 16.08 million viewers, finishing as CBS's ninth most-watched program of the 2009–10 television season and one of the network's highest-rated new series.

Episode	US ratings		Canada ratings			Australia ratings			UK ratings		
Episode	Original air date	Viewers (millions)	Viewers (millions)	Rank		Original air date	Viewers (millions)	Week Rank	Original air date	Viewers (millions)	Week Rank
Episode	Original air date	Viewers (millions)	Viewers (millions)	Night	Week	Original air date	Viewers (millions)	Week Rank	Original air date	Viewers (millions)	Week Rank
"Identity"	September 22, 2009	18.73	1.701	2	14	September 30, 2009	0.935	40	October 21, 2009	0.735	5
"The Only Easy Day"	September 29, 2009	17.40	1.927	3	18	October 7, 2009	0.915	40	October 21, 2009	0.554	9
"Predator"	October 6, 2009	16.31	1.926	2	14	October 14, 2009	1.435	38	October 28, 2009	0.563	10
"Search and Destroy"	October 13, 2009	15.38	1.857	2	15	October 21, 2009	1.052	29	October 28, 2009	0.576	9
"Killshot"	October 20, 2009	16.48	1.887	2	13	October 28, 2009	1.429	36	November 4, 2009	0.507	10
"Keepin' It Real"	November 3, 2009	15.29	1.788	4	19	November 11, 2009	1.293	40	November 4, 2009	0.580	8
"Pushback"	November 10, 2009	16.23	2.141	2	13	November 18, 2009	1.302	39	November 11, 2009	0.530	8
"Ambush"	November 17, 2009	14.87	1.890	2	14	March 23, 2010	1.25	40+	November 18, 2009	0.463	9
"Random on Purpose"	November 24, 2009	17.22	1.929	3	13	March 30, 2010	1.3	8	November 25, 2009	0.567	5
"Brimstone"	December 15, 2009	17.50	0.917 (Note: These episodes aired in Canada at 10 pm on the Monday preceding their U.S. broadcast)	11	29	April 6, 2010	0.838	40	March 15, 2010	<0.581	-
"Breach"	January 5, 2010	18.07	1.582	5	11	April 13, 2010	1.24	38	March 22, 2010	<0.480	-
"Past Lives"	January 12, 2010	15.60	1.399	5	20	April 20, 2010	0.771	64	March 29, 2010	0.564	9
"Missing"	January 26, 2010	16.94	1.239	4	21	April 27, 2010	0.898	47	April 5, 2010	<0.511	-
"LD50"	February 2, 2010	16.42	1.770	3	16	May 4, 2010	1.36	36	April 12, 2010	0.560	9
"The Bank Job"	February 9, 2010	17.91	1.937	3	18	May 11, 2010	1.32	39	April 19, 2010	0.574	7
"Chinatown"	March 2, 2010	14.84	1.783	2	17	May 18, 2010	1.44	34	April 26, 2010	<0.496	-
"Full Throttle"	March 9, 2010	17.00	1.832	3	16	May 25, 2010	1.42	36	May 3, 2010		
"Blood Brothers"	March 16, 2010	15.10	2.053	3	6	June 1, 2010	0.964	13	May 10, 2010		
"Hand-to-Hand"	April 6, 2010	13.79	1.741	3	14	June 8, 2010	0.916	51	May 17, 2010		
"Fame"	April 27, 2010	15.62	N/A	N/A	N/A	June 15, 2010	0.946	52	May 24, 2010	0.484	10
"Found"	May 4, 2010	14.34	N/A	N/A	N/A	June 22, 2010	0.817	63	May 31, 2010		
"Hunted"	May 11, 2010	16.04	N/A	N/A	N/A	June 29, 2010	0.828	58	June 7, 2010	0.535	7
"Burned"	May 18, 2010	15.32	1.037	10	30	July 6, 2010	1.046	32	June 14, 2010	0.425	6
"Callen, G"	May 25, 2010	13.23	0.785	12	30	July 13, 2010	0.930	47	June 21, 2010	0.561	2

== Home video release ==
NCIS: Los Angeles: The First Season
Set details	Special features	
24 episodes; Aspect ratio: 1.78:1; Audio: Dolby Digital 5.1; Subtitles: English, French, Spanish, Hungarian, Hindi; English SDH	Bonus Featurettes: Inspired Television: NCIS: LA; The L.A. Team: Meet the Cast and Crew; Inside the Inner Sanctum: The Set Tour; Do You Have a Visual? Inside the OPS Center; Lights, Camera...ACTION! The Stunts of NCIS: LA; Commentary; Shane Brennan on "Identity"; Blu-ray: Bonus features: Inspired Television: NCIS:LA; The L.A. Team: Meet the Cast and Crew; Inside the Inner Sanctum: The Set Tour; Do You Have a Visual? Inside the OPS Center; Lights, Camera...ACTION! The Stunts of NCIS:LA; L.L. Cool J Music Video "No Crew Is Superior"; The Making of... "No Crew Is Superior"; Commentary track with Shane Brennan; CBS Promos; BD CONNECT	
DVD release dates
Region 1	Region 2	Region 4
August 31, 2010	August 2, 2010	August 19, 2010
Blu-ray release dates
Region A		Region B
August 31, 2010		
