= Cihuri =

- Municipality
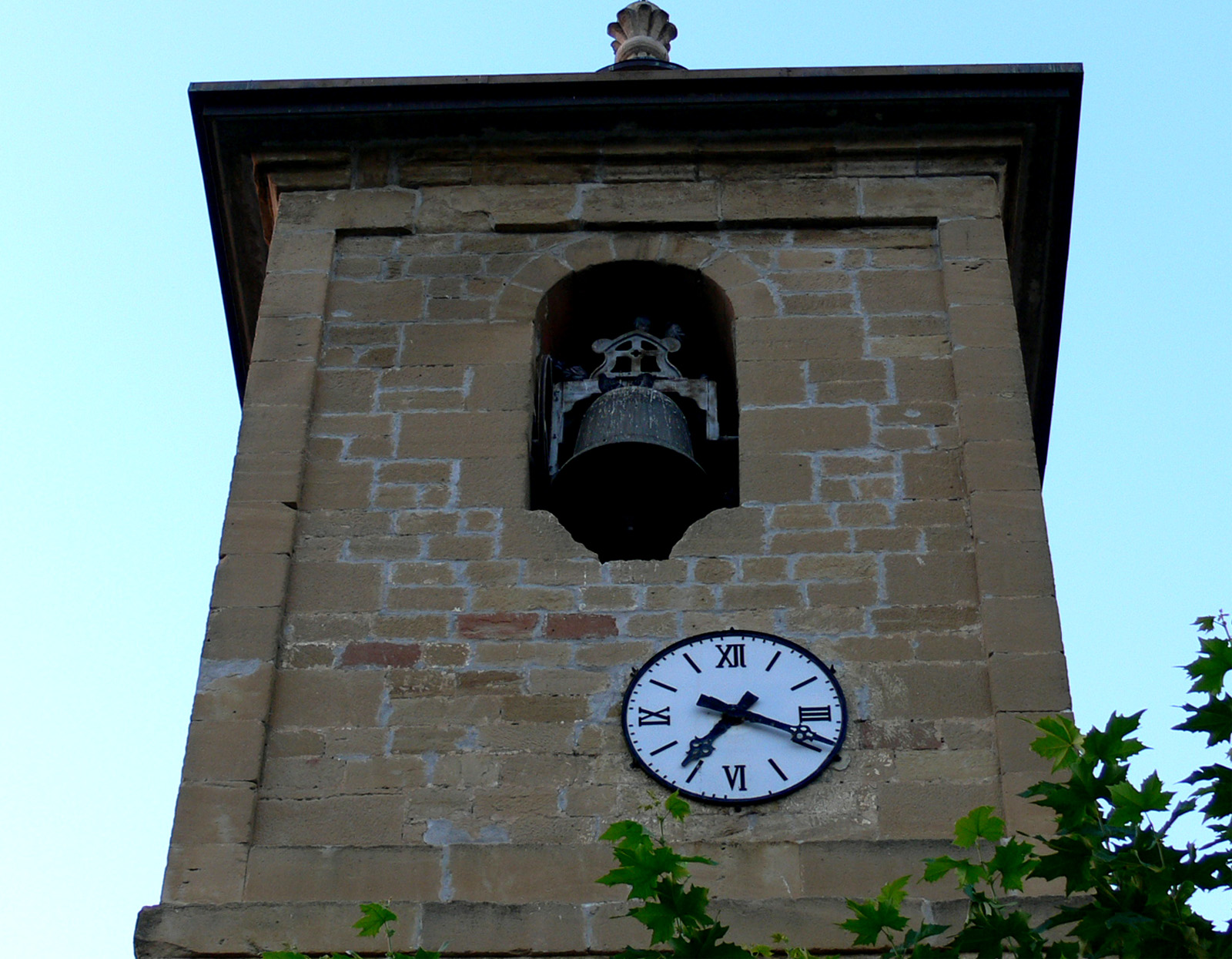
- "San Juan Bautista church"

- Location in the Province of La Rioja Cihuri (Spain)
- Coordinates: 42°33′52″N 2°55′19″W
- Country: Spain
- Autonomous community: La Rioja
- Province: Province of La Rioja
- Comarca: Haro
- Founded: Circa 10th century

Government
  - Alcalde: Neftalí Isasi Gómez (People's Party)

Area
  - Total: 30.21 km^{2} (11.66 sq mi)
- Elevation: 525 m (1,722 ft)

Population (2025-01-01)
  - Total: 205
  - Density: 6.79/km^{2} (17.6/sq mi)
- Demonym(s): Cihureño, ña
- Time zone: UTC+1 (CET)
  - Summer (DST): UTC+2 (CEST)
- Postal code: 26210
- Official language(s): Spanish
- Website: Official website

Cihuri is a village in the province and autonomous community of La Rioja, Spain. The municipality covers an area of 9.76 square kilometres (3.77 sq mi) and as of 2011 had a population of 223 people.

== History ==
In the year 947, the Spanish count Fernán González, donated to the monastery of San Millán de la Cogolla, a monastery which was dedicate to San Juan Bautista located in Zufiuri, After a short period, the same count gave the title of villa to this village. This caused some conflicts between the inhabitants of the villa and the friars. Due to that, the villa became to rename Cihuri de San Millán.

In the middle of the 11th century, King Fernando I de Castilla, confirmed any assignment of Fernan Gonzalez to San Millán and broad with the donation of lands, vineyards, orchards, meadows, fruit trees and Cihuri mills.

In 1075, with the occasion of the transfer of the work by the monarch Mr Sancho Garcés IV de Navarra and his wife Mrs Placencia to the monastery of San Millán, a farm called Urturi and another place called Zagazabarnowadays called Zaharra in areas close to Ciguri.

In 1077, a dispute occurs between the Monastery of San Millán and the neighboring Cihuri, Pelayo Sarracinez and Gonzalo Sarracinez for refusing to comply with its obligations to settlers with the monastery. Alfonso VI referred the case to the merino, and this the ruled in favor of San Millán, but took the matter to be resolved. The discontent of the Sarracinez with justice encouraged them to kill the real sent and to undertake an immediate flight of Cihuri.

In 1080 Messrs. Orbit Aznares and Sancho Ortiz, give way to the monastery of San Millán their properties in the monastery of albiano, near Cihuri

At the end of 19th century, the villa ceased to belong to the Monastery of San Millán

Cihuri formed part of the judicial district of Santo Domingo de la Calzada, in the province of Burgos, up to the creation of the province of Logróño.

== Demography ==
On 1 January 2010, the municipality's population amounted to 215 inhabitants, 115 men and 100 women.

== Politics ==
List of mayors since the democratic elections of 1979
Term	Mayor	Political party
1979–1983	Marciano Velasco Arranz	CD
1983–1987	Juan Bautista Valgañon Abaigar	AP
1987–1991	Fermín Gómez Comunión	AP
1991–1995	Antonio Conde Ruiz	PP
1995–1999	Antonio Conde Ruiz	PP
1999–2003	Neftalí Isasi Gómez	PP
2003–2007	Neftalí Isasi Gómez	PP
2007–2011	Neftalí Isasi Gómez	PP
2011–2015	Neftalí Isasi Gómez	PP
2015–2019	Neftalí Isasi Gómez	PP
2019–2023	Neftalí Isasi Gómez	PP
2023–	n/d	n/d

== Patrimony ==
- The Church of San Juan Bautista: Constructed in the neoclassical style of the 19th century. The reredos of the high altar were built in the first half of the 18th century and its style is baroque.
- The House of Priorato: House of the 17th century with shield of the Monastery of San Millán. Located outside the urban core.

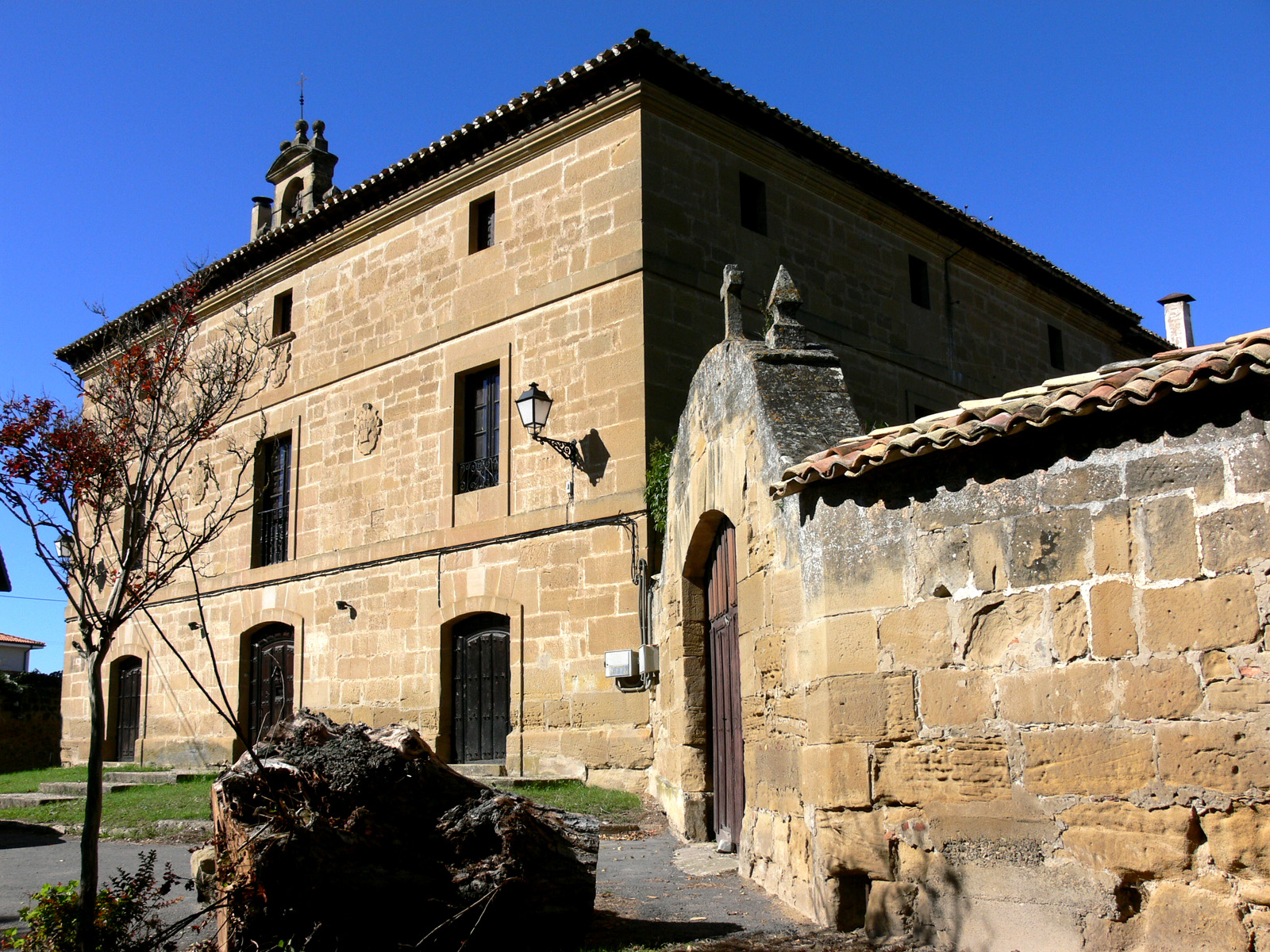
Priority House

- Romano Bridge: Situated in the house of Priorato. It was rebuilt in the Middle Ages. It was declared to be of cultural interest in the category of monuments on 26 February 1982.

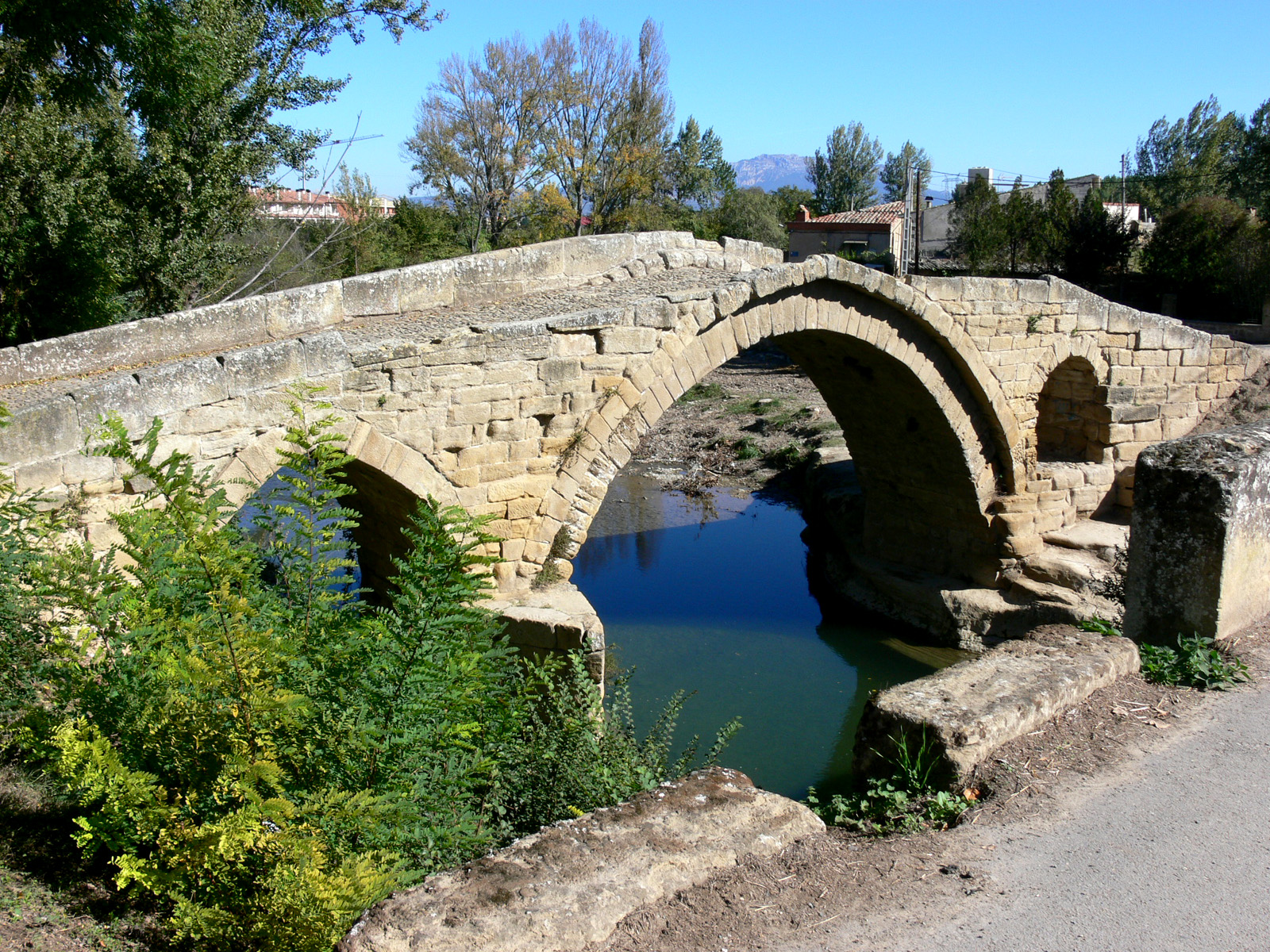
Roman Bridge

== Local festivals ==
- 15 May, the feast of San Isidro Labrador. There is a pilgrimage to the hill of slavery, located 2 km away from the town center near the Obarenes mountains, where the legend said that in a cave there appeared an image of the Virgin and this is called since then of slavery. In his honor and along with the image of San Isidro, celebrates Mass in the own closed, followed by picnic, dances...
- From 6 to 9 August is the festival in honor of Mr Clemente.
- The third Saturday in September, the Festival of thanks is celebrated by the people in Cihuri

== See also ==
- La Rioja (Spain)
