= Jhon Palacios =

Colombian footballer (born 1999)

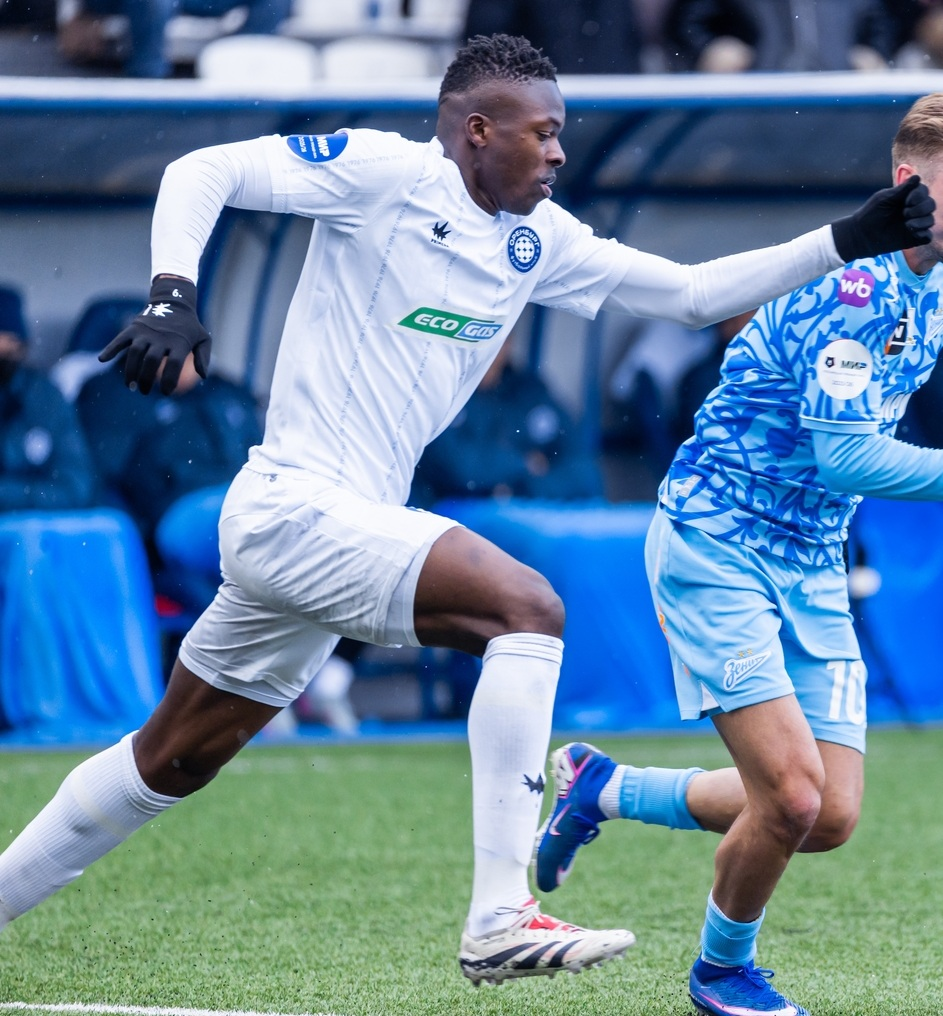
- Palacios with Orenburg in 2026

Personal information
- Full name: Jhon Alexander Palacios Santos
- Date of birth: 2 October 1999 (age 27)
- Place of birth: Apartadó, Colombia
- Height: 1.88 m (6 ft 2 in)
- Position: Defender

Team information
- Current team: Orenburg
- Number: 6

Senior career*
| Years | Team | Apps | (Gls) |
| 2019–2021 | Itagüí Leones | 24 | (0) |
| 2021 | → América de Cali (loan) | 11 | (0) |
| 2022 | Deportivo Pereira | 18 | (0) |
| 2023–2025 | Independiente Medellín | 60 | (4) |
| 2024 | → La Equidad (loan) | 14 | (1) |
| 2026– | Orenburg | 25 | (1) |
- * Club domestic league appearances and goals as of 8 November 2026

Jhon Alexander Palacios Santos (born 2 October 1999) is a Colombian professional footballer who plays as a defender for Russian club Orenburg.

== Early life ==
Palacios was born on 2 October 1999. The younger brother of Colombian sprinter Eliecith Palacios, he is the younger brother of Colombian footballer Clemente Palacios.

== Career ==
Palacios started his career with Colombian side Itagüí Leones in 2019, where he made twenty-four league appearances and scored zero goals. During the summer of 2021 he was sent on loan to Colombian side América de Cali, where he made eleven league appearances and scored zero goals.

One year later, he signed for Colombian side Deportivo Pereira, where he made eighteen league appearances and scored zero goals and helped the club win the league title. Ahead of the 2023 season, he signed for Colombian side Independiente Medellín, where he made sixty league appearances and scored four goals. Subsequently, he was sent on loan to Colombian side La Equidad in 2024, where he made fourteen league appearances and scored one goal. Following his stint there, he signed for Russian side FC Orenburg in 2026.

== Career statistics ==
As of 8 November 2026

| Club | Season | League | | | Cup | | Continental | | Other | | Total | |
| Club | Season | Division | Apps | Goals | Apps | Goals | Apps | Goals | Apps | Goals | Apps | Goals |
|---|---|---|---|---|---|---|---|---|---|---|---|---|
| Itagüí Leones | 2019 | Categoría Primera B | 4 | 0 | 3 | 0 | — | | — | | 7 | 0 |
| Itagüí Leones | 2020 | Categoría Primera B | 2 | 0 | 4 | 0 | — | | — | | 6 | 0 |
| Itagüí Leones | 2021 | Categoría Primera B | 18 | 0 | 1 | 0 | — | | — | | 19 | 0 |
| Itagüí Leones | Total | | 24 | 0 | 8 | 0 | 0 | 0 | 0 | 0 | 32 | 0 |
| América de Cali (loan) | 2021 | Liga DIMAYOR | 11 | 0 | 2 | 0 | — | | 1 (Note: Appearance in Superliga Colombiana) | 0 | 14 | 0 |
| Deportivo Pereira | 2022 | Liga DIMAYOR | 18 | 0 | 0 | 0 | — | | — | | 18 | 0 |
| Independiente Medellín | 2023 | Liga DIMAYOR | 30 | 1 | 1 | 1 | 9 (Note: Seven appearances in Copa Libertadores, two appearances in Copa Sudamericana) | 0 | — | | 40 | 2 |
| Independiente Medellín | 2024 | Liga DIMAYOR | 12 | 1 | 0 | 0 | 2 (Note: Appearances in Copa Sudamericana) | 0 | — | | 14 | 1 |
| Independiente Medellín | 2025 | Liga DIMAYOR | 18 | 2 | 2 | 0 | — | | — | | 20 | 2 |
| Independiente Medellín | Total | | 60 | 4 | 3 | 1 | 11 | 0 | 0 | 0 | 74 | 5 |
| La Equidad (loan) | 2024 | Liga DIMAYOR | 14 | 1 | 1 | 0 | — | | — | | 15 | 1 |
| Orenburg | 2025–26 | Russian Premier League | 12 | 0 | 0 | 0 | — | | — | | 12 | 0 |
| Orenburg | 2026–27 | Russian Premier League | 13 | 1 | 0 | 0 | — | | — | | 13 | 1 |
| Orenburg | Total | | 25 | 1 | 0 | 0 | 0 | 0 | 0 | 0 | 25 | 1 |
| Career total | | | 152 | 6 | 14 | 1 | 11 | 0 | 1 | 0 | 178 | 7 |

== Honours ==
Deportivo Pereira

- Liga DIMAYOR: 2022 Finalización
