= Murder of Margaret Anderson =

1983 murder in Wisconsin, United States

- Location: 44.48148°N 87.98330°W; Green Bay, Wisconsin
- Date: December 26, 1983
- Attack type: Assault, murder
- Weapon: Buck knife
- Deaths: 1
- Victim: Margaret Anderson
- Assailants: Randolph Whiting; Mark Lukensmeyer; Mark Hinton; Denice Stumpner
- No. of participants: 4
- Verdict: Guilty
- Convictions: First-degree murder; Aiding and abetting aggravated assault; Kidnapping; First-degree sexual assault
- Convicted: 4

On December 26, 1983, in Green Bay, Wisconsin, Margaret Anderson (born October 6, 1948) was beaten, tortured, raped and finally killed by four members of a biker gang inside the Back Forty local bar. The case was finally solved after four years of work by the Green Bay Police Department, other jurisdictions, and the help of America's Most Wanted television show.

== Murder ==
On Monday December 26, a friend of Anderson, Terry “Weasel” Apfel, a member of the local Drifters motorcycle club, stopped by her house at afternoon, and together they went out to see a movie and have a few drinks. At around 11:00 p.m., Apfel and Anderson went to a bar called the Back Forty. The bar was owned by Mark “Shotgun” Lukensmeyer, himself also a Drifter. Inside, some members of the Drifters and of the DC Eagles, another biker gang, had already spent the evening with heavy drinking and taking drugs. Members of both clubs generally valued their motorcycles more than women, who were often seen as property that could be traded or beaten easily.

At a certain point and after many drinks, one of the Drifters’ girlfriends and Anderson started fighting. Both women had to be separated. After that Apfel sensed that he and Anderson were no longer welcome, so they decided to leave the bar. It was almost closing time, so the other patrons began to leave. Outside the bar, an angry and intoxicated Anderson confronted Apfel, pulled his hair and slapped him in the face. Furious, Apfel threw her to the ground and repeatedly kicked her with his steel-toe boots in the head and body. Then he pushed her towards three members of the D.C. Eagles, and said “Here, you guys can have her.” He got in his car and drove away.

The three D.C. Eagles — Randolph “Gargoyle” Whiting, Denice “Bobber” Stumpner and Mark “A.D.” Hinton — began beating and kicking Anderson. Mark Lukensmeyer, the owner of the Back Forty, watched the scene from the doorway. Chris Shavlik, the bartender, tried to intervene, but there was nothing she could do. Shavlik got into her car and left. Now Lukensmeyer joined the other three men in spanking Anderson. The four men subsequently took Anderson inside the bar. For the next two hours, the group subjected Anderson to severe beatings and sexual abuse. They snapped a cue stick in half and pulled a cue ball into Anderson's vagina. Anderson attempted to fight back. At one point, Anderson cut Stumpner with a knife. Her attack resulted in more beatings.

Eventually, the men left the bar and took Anderson with them. They pushed her into the back seat of Lukensmeyer's Grand Torino and drove to the Packerland Meat Packing Plant. The group parked behind the company's manure clean-out area. Whiting exited the vehicle, pulling Margaret out by her hair. He dragged her through the snow. Then Whiting pulled out his buck knife and slit Anderson's throat. She was left to die. Blood was coming out "like a fountain of water" from the neck cut. Around 3 o'clock in the morning, Anderson was dead.

== Aftermath ==
Randolph Whiting was on the run for eight months until being found on March 21, 1985. He was charged with first-degree murder and sentenced to life. Mark Lukensmeyer was sentenced to fifty years for aiding and abetting aggravated assault, kidnapping, and first-degree sexual assault. Mark Hinton also had a 50-year sentence. It took four and a half years to locate Denice Stumpner. After his face was broadcast on America's Most Wanted, it only took three days to find him. He was also sentenced to fifty years.

According to the law, Hinton, Lukensmeyer, and Stumpner's fifty-year sentences resulted in mandatory release after only 22 years. Hinton was freed under supervision in the summer of 2007, followed by Lukensmeyer in the spring of 2008. Stumpner's required release date with supervision was January 20, 2011. Randolph Whiting, the only one of the four to be convicted of the murder, was paroled in 2020.

== Bibliography ==
- Dauplaise, Mike (2009). Torture at the Back Forty The Gang Rape and Slaying of Margaret Anderson. TitleTown Publishing.
- Freiss, Timothy (2023). Green Bay Murder & Mayhem. History Press.
