= Ángelo Paleso =

Uruguayan footballer (born 1983)

Personal information
- Full name: Jorge Ángelo Paleso Carbajal
- Date of birth: 24 July 1983 (age 43)
- Place of birth: Santa Lucía, Uruguay
- Height: 1.73 m (5 ft 8 in)
- Position: Defensive midfielder

Team information
- Current team: Wanderers de Santa Lucía
- Number: 7

Youth career
- C.A. Peñarol

Senior career*
Years	Team	Apps	(Gls)
2007–2011	Miramar Misiones	61	(1)
2011	C.S. Visé	6	(0)
2012	1. FC Bocholt	7	(0)
2012–	Sud América		
- * Club domestic league appearances and goals as of Season-End 2011/2012

Jorge Ángelo Paleso Carbajal (born July 24, 1983 in Santa Lucía), commonly known as Ángelo Paleso, is a Uruguayan footballer, who currently plays for Wanderers de Santa Lucía.

== Career ==
Carbajal began his career with CA Peñarol and joined for the start of his senior career 2005 to Miramar Misiones. He played during his four and a half years 161 games for his club Miramor and scored once.

On 27 June 2011 after a successful trial with Belgium side C.S. Visé, signed a one-year contract with the club. The contract with the defensive midfielder was on 26 January 2012 resigned and he joined to German Verbandsliga Niederrhein club 1. FC Bocholt.

In August 2012, he signed a new deal with Uruguayan Segunda División side Sud América. Now he plays for Santa Lucía FC, a local foto Ball team known as "El Santa".
