= Lindor =

Lindor may refer to:

- Lindor (name), list of people with the name
- Lindor (card game), a popular French family game nowadays known as Nain Jaune
- A type of chocolate produced by Lindt & Sprüngli
- A character in the play The Barber of Seville

== See also ==
- Linder (disambiguation)
