= Lindor (name) =

Lindor is a surname which is also used as a masculine given name. People with the name include:

== Surname ==
- Brignol Lindor (1970–2001), Haitian radio journalist and news editor
- Francisco Lindor (born 1993), Puerto Rican professional baseball player
- Katheleen Lindor (born 1989), French artistic gymnast

== Given name ==
- George Lindor Brown (1903–1971), British physiologist and academic

== See also ==
- Lindor (disambiguation)
