= Identity (NCIS: Los Angeles) =

- NCIS: Los Angeles episode
- Episode no.: Season 1 Episode 1
- Directed by: James Whitmore, Jr.
- Written by: Shane Brennan
- Production code: 101
- Original air date: September 22, 2009
- Running time: 44 minutes

Guest appearance
- Rocky Carroll as Leon Vance

Episode chronology
← Previous —	Next → "The Only Easy Day"
- NCIS: Los Angeles (season 1)

"Identity" is the pilot episode and the first episode of the series' first season of the American police procedural television series NCIS: Los Angeles, which is a spin-off of NCIS (though the first appearance of the characters occurred in the twenty-second and twenty-third episodes of the sixth season of NCIS, with the episodes being titled "Legend (Parts 1 & 2)").

The episode was written by Shane Brennan and directed by James Whitmore, Jr. The plot follows the NCIS Office of Special Projects (OSP) as they race to solve a kidnapping case. The episode also marks the debut appearance of Agent Dominic Vail and Operations Manager, Henrietta Lange, and all of the characters. The episode premiered on CBS in the United States on September 22, 2009, after the seventh season premiere of NCIS.

== Plot ==
The episode starts with a police chase where a van is cornered and the gunmen are killed. The police discover a dead body of a Naval Commander inside. G. Callen (Chris O'Donnell), having successfully recovered from his near-fatal shooting at the end of the back-door pilot episode, "Legend", rejoins the NCIS Office of Special Projects team whose headquarters have since moved to new surroundings and now under command of Operations Manager, Henrietta Lange (Linda Hunt). NCIS Director Leon Vance (Rocky Carroll) informs the team about the Naval Commander case, and the team realizes the Commander was executed. After following various leads, the team discover that the Commander's actions might have jeopardized a highly classified military operation against various drug cartels in Mexico and also his young niece is being held hostage. Callen informs Director Vance, but the Operation is still to be commenced. Callen and Sam infiltrate Manny Cortez's house, only to find out that the Commander's brother-in-law is the one responsible for the young girl being held as a hostage. Worse, Callen and Sam are compromised as Kensi previously spoke to the father as she and Nate were with the Commander's sister. The team's new agent Dominic Vail (Adam Jamal Craig) phones Callen and has him trick the father into thinking he was the Commander. Callen and Sam defeat the father and the girl returns home. The episode ends with Callen staying the night at the Office.

== Reception ==
"Identity" aired on CBS on September 22, 2009, during the 10 to 11 pm (ET) timeslot. The pilot episode was seen by 18.73 million viewers, with a total household rating/share of 8.9/15, and a 4.4/11 ratings/share among those aged 18 through 49. The episode came first in its timeslot, beating the series premiere of The Mentalist, which occupied the timeslot in the previous year.

The episode received mixed reviews from critics. Noel Murray of AV Club gave the pilot a C− explaining that "NCIS: Los Angeles isn’t really about spending time with old friends. It’s about spending time with new machines—packed with old wiring."
