= Santa Lucía, Uruguay =

Santa Lucía
- City & Municipality
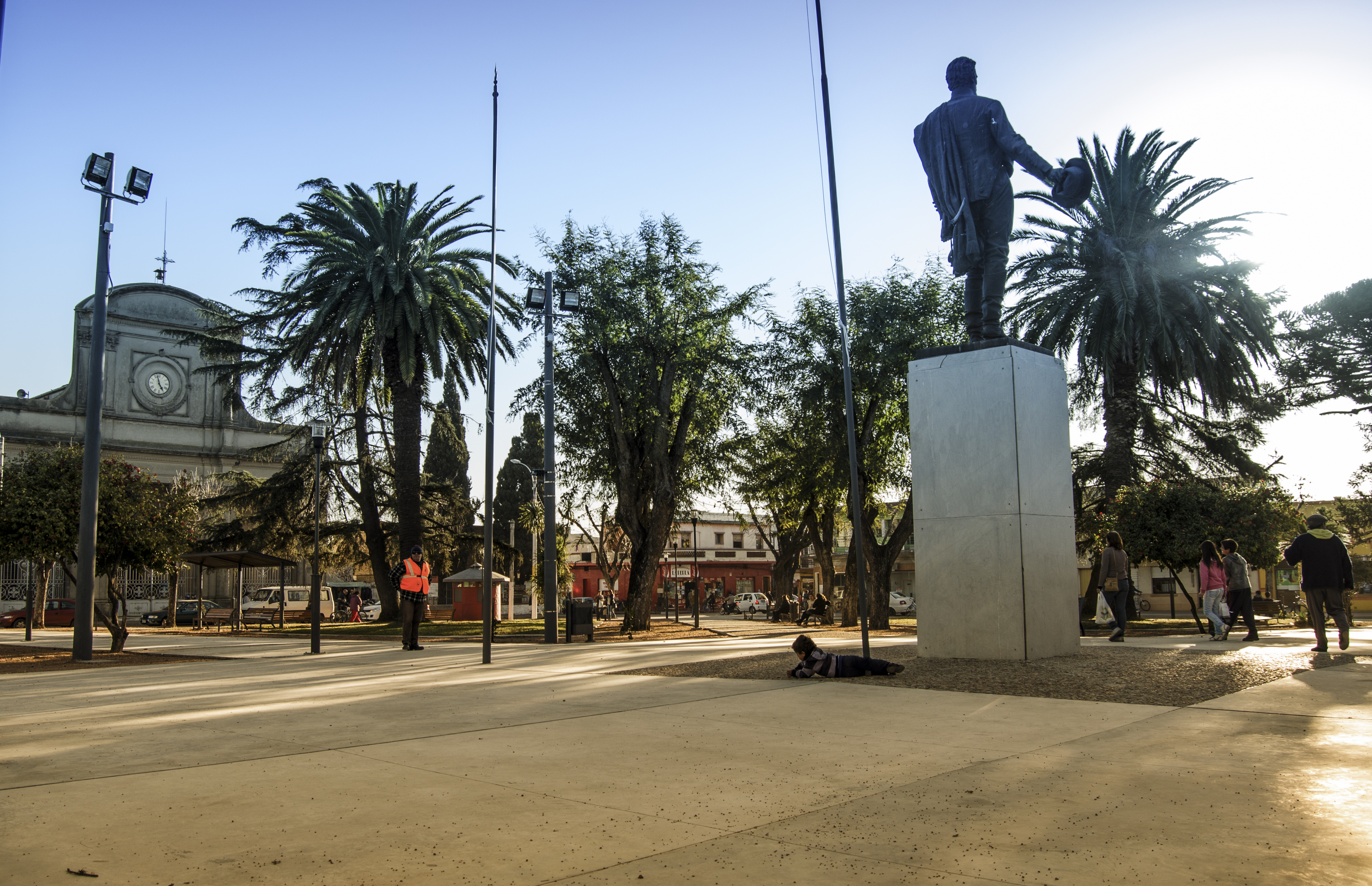
- Tomás Berreta square with the monument to José Gervasio Artigas; in the background, the parish church of St. John the Baptist.

- Location within Uruguay
- Coordinates: 34°27′9″S 56°23′47″W
- Country: Uruguay
- Department: Canelones
- Founded: 1782

Population (2011 Census)
  - Total: 16,742
- Time zone: UTC -3
- Postal code: 90700
- Dial plan: +598 433 (+5 digits)

Santa Lucía (Spanish pronunciation: [ˈsanta luˈsi.a]) is a city in the Canelones Department of southern Uruguay.

Santa Lucía is also the name of the municipality to which the city belongs.

== Geography ==
The city is located on the intersection of Route 11 with Route 63, about 60 kilometres (37 mi) northwest of the centre of Montevideo. The river Río Santa Lucía, after which the city is named, flows along the northwestern limits of the city.

== History ==
Santa Lucía was founded in 1782 with the name of Villa San Juan Bautista. It had acquired the status of "Villa" (town) before the Independence of Uruguay. On 15 June 1925, its status was elevated to "Ciudad" (city) by the Act of Ley Nº 7.837.

== Population ==
According to the 2011 census, Santa Lucía had a population of 16,742. In 2010, the Intendencia de Canelones estimated a population of 18,346 for the municipality during the elections.

Location map of the Municipality of Santa Lucía

Year	Population
1963	12,647
1975	14,079
1985	14,951
1996	16,764
2004	16,475
2011	16,742

Source: Instituto Nacional de Estadística de Uruguay

== Places of worship ==
- Church of St. John the Baptist (Roman Catholic)

== Government ==
The city mayor as of July 2010 is Raúl Estramín.

== Notable people ==
- José Cancela (1976), football player
- Ángelo Paleso (1983), football player
- Clemente Estable (1894–1976), writer
- Walter Santoro (1922–2011), politician
- Eugenio Figueredo (1932), President of CONMEBOL
