= C. Daniel Clemente =

American attorney, business executive, and consultant

- Born: October 14, 1936 (age 89); Manhattan, New York, U.S.
- Education: Fordham University (B.S.); Georgetown University Law Center (J.D.)
- Occupations: Attorney, Real Estate Developer, Business Consultant
- Board member of: Virginia Economic Development Partnership
- Awards: George Mason Medal (2014)

C. Daniel Clemente (born October 14, 1936) is an American attorney, business executive, and consultant. He is the founder and CEO of Clemente Development Company, Inc., a real estate property management and development company based in Tysons Corner, Virginia. Clemente is a noted expert on real estate bankruptcy and corporate liquidation and has served as a court-appointed Receiver and Trustee for numerous companies. He is the former chair of the Board of Visitors for George Mason University, holding the position from July 2012 through June 2014. He currently serves on the board of directors for the Virginia Economic Development Partnership.

== Early life ==
Clemente was born Costantino Daniel Clemente in Manhattan to Louis James and Amelia T. Clemente. His father was a surgeon who served in World War II as a Major in the U.S. Army. Clemente grew up in Brooklyn, attended the Brooklyn Preparatory School and matriculated to Fordham University, where he received his B.S. in economics in 1958. Following a year of postgraduate work at Marquette University, Clemente attended Georgetown University Law Center and was a member of the law review. He graduated with a J.D. in 1963 and was admitted to the bar in the same year.

== Business career ==
Clemente began working as an attorney dealing with defaulted real estate transactions and bankruptcies for local banks in Springfield, Virginia. He opened his first law firm and development company in 1965 with his business partner Charles Edward Taylor. The company developed and built Tower Villas, the first residential condominium complex in Virginia. All of the condominiums in the complex were sold before construction was completed. Following a series of additional residential and commercial projects, Clemente exited real estate development at the onset of the mid-1970s recession and began to work with banking institutions on distressed assets. He also helped found two community banks in Northern Virginia, Community Bank and Trust in Springfield and First Commercial Bank in Arlington.

By the 1980s, his expertise in dealing with bad loan portfolios and real estate made him one of the foremost experts on the topic in the United States and a qualified expert witness for numerous court cases. During the savings and loan crisis, Clemente was nominated by Virginia Senator John Warner to serve as chairman of the Resolution Trust Corporation (RTC). While the position went to Al Casey, Clemente worked closely with the RTC throughout its existence, as a preferred contractor through Clemente Development Company, Inc., CDC Debt Recovery Group, Inc., and CDC Consulting Group, Inc. Serving as an advisor to the RTC and the Federal Deposit Insurance Corporation, Clemente managed the restructuring and sale of real estate portfolios obtained during the crisis.

Despite his work with the RTC, Clemente was one of its most prominent critics, calling into question the distortionary impact of the RTC in the real estate market. Clemente testified before the Senate Banking Committee of the United States Congress and provided several editorials to The Wall Street Journal and The Washington Post that called into question the fundamental process undertaken by the RTC to quickly sell the property it obtained. Clemente felt that the immediate liquidation of the troubled assets by the RTC benefited a small group of investors at taxpayers' expense and caused distortions in the real estate market. After parting ways with the RTC following its closure, Clemente served as a consultant to banking institutions, the Federal Government, and real estate developers. He also refocused his company on commercial property development, purchasing several office buildings in the greater Washington, DC area. For his property development work, Clemente was named one of the 50 most influential Virginians by Virginia Business in 2018.

Clemente served as an asset consultant to members of the Kohler family during a stock buyback undertaken by the Kohler Company in 1998. He again served as consultant for members of the Cargill family during a similar dispute with Cargill management and its shareholders. He also served as the attorney for Muhammad Ali and worked as a court-appointed trustee cleaning up securities fraud cases before retiring from law in 2002.

== Politics ==
Clemente has also been extensively involved in politics, both on a national level and in Virginia. He chaired Alexander Haig's 1988 bid for the Republican Party's nomination for President. After Haig dropped out of the race, Clemente was recruited by Roger Ailes to serve on the senior campaign staff of George H. W. Bush. He also supported the efforts of former Virginia Attorney General Marshall Coleman to run as an independent alternative to the Republican nominee Oliver North during the 1994 U.S. Senate race in Virginia. The presence of Coleman on the ballot hampered North's support and led to the re-election of the Democratic nominee Chuck Robb.

Clemente is the former Rector for George Mason University, first elected by the Board of Visitors in July 2012 and serving until the end of June 2014. He was originally appointed to the Board by Virginia Governor Bob McDonnell in July 2010. In recognition of his service to George Mason University, Clemente was awarded the Mason Medal in October, 2014. The Mason Medal is the university's highest honor, bestowed upon those with distinguished records of public service. Clemente was also commended by the Virginia General Assembly for his contributions to George Mason University and the Commonwealth of Virginia.

More recently, Clemente has served on the board of the Virginia Economic Development Partnership since being appointed on January 10, 2014. The Virginia Economic Development Partnership (VEDP) is an organization created by the Virginia General Assembly in 1995 to encourage and support the development and expansion of the economy of the state. As a member of the Board, Clemente was elected as the Vice Chairman in June, 2015 and subsequently was tabbed to lead VEDP's Legislation and Policy Committee. On June 9, 2016, Clemente was elected Chairman of VEDP by his fellow members, succeeding Chris Lumsden. He served in that capacity until 2017, when the Board was restructured by the Virginia General Assembly. Clemente was subsequently reappointed as a member of the new Board in June 2017.

Clemente was also appointed to the Attorney General's Government and Regulatory Reform Task Force by McDonnell when the latter served as Virginia's Attorney General. Clemente has also served other Virginia Governors as well, with former Governor Mark Warner appointing him to the Governor's Advisory Council on Revenue Estimates. He also was appointed by former Governor Douglas Wilder to chair the Virginia Economic Recovery Commission's Committee of Capital Formation.

== Philanthropy ==
Clemente serves on the board of Friends of Clemyjontri, an organization that supports Clemyjontri Park in McLean, Virginia. This park and playground is designed so that it is completely accessible for all individuals, including children and adults with special needs. The park features several modifications and additions to ensure all visitors can enjoy the park and playground experience. Of particular note is the Liberty Swing, a specially modified wheelchair-accessible swing, the first of its kind in Virginia. In recognition of his work with Clemyjontri Park, Clemente was given the honorary title of Lord Fairfax by the Fairfax County Board of Supervisors.

Clemente has also been a benefactor for several universities and numerous artistic endeavors.
