= Allan Linder =

American painter

- Born: 1966 (age 59–60); California
- Occupations: Painter, sculptor, illustrator, writer
- Website: allanlinder.com

Allan Linder (born 1966) is an American artist living in New York. He is a painter, sculptor, illustrator and writer. He uses a variety of media, but mostly acrylic paint on canvas.

== Background ==
Linder was born in California in 1966, the great grandson of Italian immigrants. Linder has exhibited internationally in São Paulo, Brazil; Hamburg, Germany; Paris, France, and Barcelona, Spain. (Gunzelman 2007, p. 21). His work is held in private collections throughout the US and internationally. (Gunzelman 2007, p. 21).

His stepfather was in the military and Linder attended more than eight elementary schools around America. Between 1979 and 1995 he painted as Allan Shaw (Shaw was the name of his stepfather).

In the 1980s Linder was immersed in the art scene, and the growing rave scene in Los Angeles. In 2000 Allan split his time between Los Angeles and New York City, eventually settling in New York. He has exhibited at the “Artists' Gallery” in Chelsea.

== Selected exhibitions ==
- 2026: 6 x 6, Group, Rochester Contemporary Art Center, Rochester, NY
- 2024: Blue Art Exhibition, Group, Artist Space Gallery, Kirkland, WA
- 2024: Big Names, Art Auction, Small Art, Crocker Art Museum, Sacramento
- 2023: Winter Exhibition, Group, Ten Moir Gallery, Brea, CA
- 2022: STOP WAR, solo, The Artists Gallery Chelsea, New York
- 2021: The Uncanny, Group, The Chateau Gallery, Louisville, Kentucky
- 2019: Anonymous Drawings Group, Kunsthaus Kannen Museum, Münster, Germany

== Bibliography ==
- Linder, A. (2022). Allan Linder: 20th Century and Beyond. ISBN 979-8-8187-8786-2
- Linder, A. (2013). Prisoner of the Mind, Vol. One. New York: Eloquent Press. ISBN 9781304308702
- Gunzelman, T. (2009). Allan Linder Wandering Soul. New York: LULU Press. LCCN: 2007909251
- Gunzelman, T. (2007). Allan Linder 20th century and beyond. New York: LULU Press. ISBN 978-0-557-07998-8
