= Clemente Estable =

Uruguayan biologist

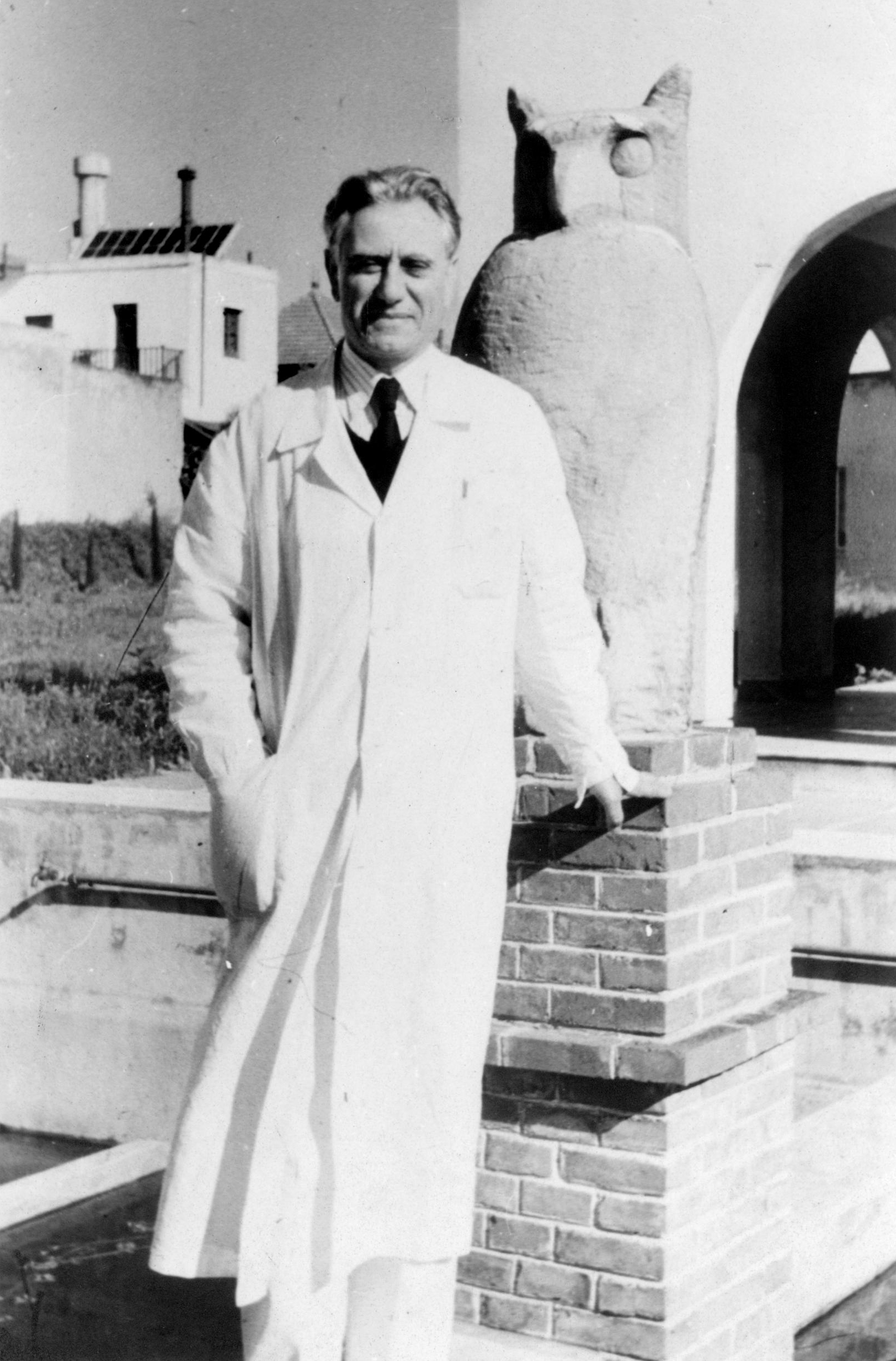
- Born: 23 May 1894; Canelones Department, Uruguay
- Died: 27 October 1976 (aged 83); Montevideo, Uruguay
- Occupations: Pedagogue, Researcher, Biologist
- Spouse: Isabel Puig
- Children: 3

Clemente Estable (23 May 1894 – 27 October 1976) was a Uruguayan biologist, researcher, and professor, best known for his work in cellular biology and neurobiology research.

In collaboration with Eduardo De Robertis and Magdalena Reissig, Estable authored a study providing definitive proof for neuron theory using the first electron microscope in South America. Estable's work showed that the nervous system was not a continuous network, but rather made up of individual neurons separated by gaps called synapses.

The Clemente Estable Biological Research Institute, which he founded in 1927, is named in his honor.

== Early life ==
Estable was born on 23 May 1894 in a rural area of Canelones, now known as Santa Lucía. He was born ninth of the fourteen children of Giuseppe Stabile and Giuseppa Fallabella, Italian immigrants from San Rufo who immigrated to Uruguay in 1865.

The family eventually relocated to La Union, on the outskirts of Montevideo. His parents ran a grocery store that Clemente and his brothers worked at. His older brother Nicolas taught him to read and helped him prepare for post-secondary education. At age 15, Estable was awarded a full scholarship to become a teacher at Normal Institutes of Montevideo. He also took extra classes at the medical school but did not attempt to become a physician.

Estable was also an autodidact of biology, psychology, and microscopy.

== Career ==
After graduating in 1914, he taught at public schools in Montevideo: Primary School #38, the Artigas School, and the España Vocational School. He also returned to teach at the Normal Institutes, where he became the chair of natural history.

In 1920, Estable became an educational inspector. He oversaw the technical proficiency of vocational schools.

He published his first book, El Reino de las Vocaciones (The Kingdom of Vocations) in 1921, at age 27. The work was accompanied by a series of lectures Estable presented to the Pedagogical Society of Uruguay.

In 1922, he received a grant from the Government of Spain to attend the Histologic Research Institute of Madrid. He studied neuroanatomy and conducted research under Nobel Prize-winning neuroscientist Santiago Ramón y Cajal. During this fellowship, Estable published novel histological findings about Purkinje cell axons in the cerebellum and the olfactory bulb.

In 1925, he returned to Montevideo and founded the Laboratory of Biology and Cinematography. A year later, Américo Ricaldoni awarded him a posting as Chief of Histological Research at the Neurological Institute.

In 1927, he founded the Institute for Biological Sciences and Research.

By 1930, Estable developed The Plan Estable, which called for teaching the scientific method as a learning tool in primary school. Through Estable's plan, the scientific method was adopted into the curricula of Natural and Applied Sciences. That same year, Estable presided over the First International Congress of Biologists in Montevideo, as president of The Uruguayan Society of Biologists.

In the 1930s, Estable was appointed professor of biology at schools of law and medicine. He also received an honorary degree from the University of Santiago, Chile.

In 1948, he presided over the first Latin American Scientists Congress, organized by UNESCO and WHO. In 1959, he was given the title of Honorary Professor of Universidad de Montevideo. In 1962, he was awarded the Legion of Honour, the highest French order of merit. In the same year, Italy awarded him an honorary position as a member of The Medical Academy of Rome.

According to Estable, scientific research, artistic creation, or philosophical reflections should offer the possibility of living with dignity in civil society. Further, he proposed that the scientist, the artist, and the philosopher all fulfill essential societal and national functions. Therefore, it is the responsibility of the elected public officials to promote these professions and create adequate conditions for them to execute their work.

== Personal life ==
During Estable's posting at the Neurological Institute, he met Isabel Puig, also a teacher. They eventually married and had three children.

== Death and legacy ==
On 27 October 1976, Estable died at the age of 82. Due to his contributions to the cultural, pedagogic, political, and scientific arenas, Estable was buried with a full ceremony reserved for Ministers of State.

In 1994, Uruguay released a stamp in his honor on the 100th anniversary of his birth. That same year, the legislature passed Law No. 16.572, which designated 15 elementary schools to be named in his honor.

== Bibliography ==
- El Reino de las Vocaciones
- 1914 – El Valor de la Objetivacion en la Ensenanza, published by Solidaridad.
- 1915 – La Nutricion, published by Solidaridad.
- 1915 – The Scholastic Competitions, published by Solidaridad.
- 1918 - "De la observación y sus medios." Rodo, Montevideo. Vol.1. nǘm.1, pp. 9–11, enero.
- 1918 - "Rotación de maestros en la las clases." Rodó, Montevideo. Vol. 1, nǘm. 2, pp. 15–16, febrero.
- 1918 - "Higiene sexual en las escuelas." Rodó, Montevideo. Vol. 1, núm. 1, pp. 13–14, enero.
- 1918 - "Las proyecciones luminosas en la enseñanza. Rodó. Montevideo. Vol. 1, núm. 5, pp. 11, marzo.
- 1918 - "Las libretas de lecciones." Rodó. Montevideo. Vol. 1, núm. 5, pp. 13–14, mayo.
- 1918 - "Dios por las escuelas." Rodó. Montevideo. Vol. 1, núm 6, pp. 4–5, junio.
- 1918 - "Encaminar a los niños a las buenas obras literarias." Rodó. Montevideo. Vol. 1, núm. 8, pp. 4–8, agosto.
- 1918 - "Cursos de vacaciones." Rodó. Montevideo. Vol. 1, núm. 10, p. 6, octubre.
- 1918 - "Huerto interno."Rodó. Montevideo. Vol.1, núms. 11-12, p.30, noviembre-diciembre.
- 1918 - "Pinceladas inarmónicas [1]." Rodó. Montevideo. Vol. 1, núm.5, pp. 5–6, mayo.
- 1918 - "Pinceladas inarmónicas [2]." Rodó. Montevideo. Vol. 1, núm.7, pp. 5–6, julio.
- 1918 - "Pinceladas inarmónicas [3]." Rodó. Montevideo. Vol. 1, núm.8, p. 3, agosto.
- 1918 - "La sugestion [1]." Rodó. Montevideo. Vol. 1, núm. 9, p. 14, setiembre.
- 1919 - "Historia de una planta humilde." La Unión. Montevideo, enero.
- 1919 - "La sugestion [2]." Rodó. Montevideo. Vol. 2, Núm. 13–14, pp. 1–20, enero-febrero.
- 1919 - "Reflexiones sobre la creencia y la duda." La Educación. Montevideo. Aňo II, Núms. 25–26, febrero.
- 1919 - "Pinceladas inarmónicas [4]." Rodó. Montevideo. Vol. 2, Núm. 15, p. 5-6, marzo.
- 1919 - "De nuestros estudiosos: Historia de una planta humilde." La Razón. Montevideo, 21 de marzo.
- 1919 - "Asueto del jueves y periodo de vacaciones." Montevideo. Tipografia Morales Hnos. pp. 13–17.
- 1919 - "Superarse a si mismo. A mi intimo amigo Sebastian Morey Otero." La Unión. Montevideo, 31 de agosto.
- 1919 - "El sueldo de los maestros." Educación. Montevideo. AñoII. Num.37, pp. 1–3, 28 de octubre.
- 1920 - "Sintesis y sugestiones de las conferencias que Pi y Suñer dictó en Montevideo." Anales de instrucción primaria y normal. Montevideo Año XVII, XVIII, Vol. 17, Núms.1-3, pp. 16–35, enero a marzo.
- 1921 - "Clases de Biología. (Resumen de las dictadas a los maestros que asistieron a los cursos de vacaciones.)- Conversaciones de Entomología, Doctrina de la neurona, Significación del hambre, en el origen del conocimiento, Cerebro y Corazon." Anales de instrucción primaria. Montevideo. Año XVIII, XIX, Tomo XVIII. Núm 9, pp. 937–989, setiembre.
- 1921 - "El Reino de las Vocaciónes; Fin Supremo de la Enseñanza." Imprenta Escuela Naval. 153, paginas.
- 1922 - "Elementos de Biología", por Isidro Más de Ayala. Anales de instrucción primaria y normal. Montevideo Año XIX, XX, Tomo 19. Núm. 5, pp. 416–420, mayo.
- 1923 - "Notes sur la structure comparative de L'ecorce céré belleuse, et derivées physiologiques possibles. Travaux de laboratoire de recherches biologiques de l'université de Madrid. Vol. 21, pp. 169-256.
- 1924 - "Systemes osmatiques et cause histologique posible de la pluralite d'energies olfactives specifiques." Travaux de laboratoire de recherches biologiques de l'université de Madrid. Vol. 22, pp. 169–358.
- 1924 - "Terminaisons nerveuses branchiales de la larve du pleurodeles a waitlii de certaines donnees sur l'innervation gustative." Travaux de laboratoire de recherches biologiques de l'université de Madrid. Vol. 22, pp. 369–384.
- 1926 - "El ángulo vísual de nuestra enseñanza es mucho más estrecha que el ángulo vocacional de la vida." La Cruz del Sur. Montevideo., Vol. 3, Núm. 11, pp. 2–3, febrero.
- 1926 - "La vendimia del espiritu. La Cruz del Sur. Montevideo. Vol. 3. Núm. 15, pp. 4–5, julio, agosto.
