= Nicholas Clemente =

American novelist

Nicholas A. Clemente J.D., LL.M. (2 February 1929 – 4 May 2009) was a justice of the New York State Supreme Court where he served for over 25 years, mainly in Brooklyn. He was also a professor, Judicial Hearing Officer and novelist. In 2005, he retired from the bench, after a brief tenure in Sullivan County, New York. He presided over a wide range of civil and criminal matters and became known for his expertise in medical malpractice cases.

== Education and other activities ==
Clemente earned his undergraduate degree in English and History from New York University, his J.D. from St. John's University and his Ll.M. from New York University School of Law, which he attended on the GI Bill after having served as a legal officer during the Korean War, in the 101st Airborne Division.

He taught business law at CUNY's Borough of Manhattan Community College and served in the New York National Guard as a colonel.

Many of his legal opinions have been published in both the New York Official Reports Service and the New York Law Journal. His experiences as an attorney and judge serve as inspiration for his novels.

== Novels ==
Pawns of Justice
Broken Gavel

Both books have been reviewed by a number of publications, including the Sullivan County Democrat, Staten Island Advance, New York Law Journal, and the Brooklyn Daily Eagle.
