= Mariano Clemente =

Argentine footballer

Personal information
- Date of birth: 1989 (age 36–37)
- Place of birth: Buenos Aires, Argentina
- Positions: Defensive midfielder; defender

Youth career
- San Lorenzo

Senior career*
Years	Team	Apps	(Gls)
2004–2008	San Lorenzo	0	(0)
2004–2005	→ Sportivo Belgrano (loan)	25	(0)
2005	→ Atlético La Milka (loan)	–	(–)
2005–2006	→ Juventud Unida (loan)	19	(0)
2006–2008	→ Sportivo Belgrano (loan)	25	(0)
2009	Deportes Puerto Montt	8	(2)
2010	Sportivo Suardi	–	(–)
2016	Almafuerte Las Varillas	–	(–)
2018–2019	Antártida Argentina	–	(–)
Total		77	(2)
- * Club domestic league appearances and goals

Mariano Clemente (born in Buenos Aires, Argentina) is an Argentine former professional footballer who played for clubs of Argentina and Chile.

== Teams ==
- (Argentina) San Lorenzo 2004–2008
- (Argentina) Sportivo Belgrano 2004–2005
- (Argentina) Atlético La Milka 2005
- (Argentina) Juventud Unida de Gualeguaychú 2005–2006
- (Argentina) Sportivo Belgrano 2006–2008
- (Chile) Deportes Puerto Montt 2009
- (Argentina) Sportivo Suardi 2010
- (Argentina) Almafuerte Las Varillas 2016
- Antártida Argentina 2018–2019
