= Jim Clemente =

American author, FBI profiler

James "Jim" T. Clemente (born October 30, 1959, San Mateo, California) is an American author, former New York State prosecutor, former FBI profiler, podcast co-host and creator of the show Real Crime Profile, and writer/producer on CBS' Criminal Minds.

== Early life ==
As a child, Clemente was a victim of sexual abuse. It wasn't until he became a prosecutor in New York in 1983, that he came forward about the abuse and decided to take action. After contacting the FBI and NYPD's Sexual Exploitation of Children Task Force, he agreed to wear a wire and was able to gather evidence to convict his abuser, the former camp director of a Catholic Youth Organization (CYO) camp, where he attended. Following this take-down, he was recruited by the FBI where he worked as an undercover agent and a profiler in the Behavioral Analysis Unit.

== FBI ==
Clemente worked for the FBI for 22 years (1987–2009) where he was an expert on child sexual abuse, victimization, abduction and homicide. He is also an expert in criminal behavioral profiling. He worked undercover in a multi-year Wall Street investigation, worked the Whitewater investigation, and was part of the team that cracked the D.C. Sniper case.

Clemente's brother, Tim. also served as a special agent in the FBI.

== Television ==
Clemente began working as a technical advisor and freelance writer for CBS' Criminal Minds in 2010. In 2015, he became a producer on the show where he continued to write and produce through its final season in 2019.

Clemente was a technical advisor on the television series Secrets and Lies, Quantico, Misconduct, and Blindspot.

Clemente created and produced the television show Manhunt: Unabomber, an 8-episode series released by Discovery in 2017.

== Podcasts ==
Clemente is the co-host of the podcast Real Crime Profile distributed on Wondery. He also hosted the limited series podcast Locked Up Abroad which served as an audio adaptation to the National Geographic television show of the same name (Locked Up Abroad). Clemente also co-created and co-hosts the podcast Best Case Worst Case where listeners are taken behind police lines.
