= Michael Linder =

American television producer and journalist

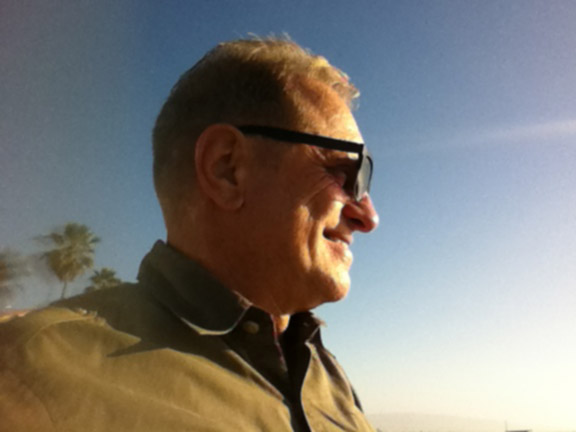
- Linder in November 2012
- Occupations: Television producer, broadcast journalist

Michael Linder (born April 8, 1961) is an American television producer and broadcast journalist based in Los Angeles, currently an investigative reporter for KABC-AM and an executive producer for Natural 9 Entertainment in Burbank. He is a contributor to BBC Radio 5 Live and KUSC.

Linder created and executive produced America's Most Wanted in 1988, casting host John Walsh and launching the first hit series on the nascent Fox television network. He left the program in 1990.

In 1990, Linder created and executive produced The Jesse Jackson Show leading a crew and host Jackson to interview Saddam Hussein in Baghdad as troops massed for the Gulf War and negotiating the release of 227 hostages held by Hussein in Kuwait City and Baghdad, including the staff of the U.S. embassy in Kuwait City.

In 1995-6 Linder created and produced "Berserkistan" with photojournalist Jim Bartlett, credited as the first Internet site to cover a war (Bosnia) on location.

From 2004 through 2009, Linder served as a radio journalist for KNX-AM. He has won numerous broadcast journalism honors including a APTRA (March 15, 2008). "Mark Twain Award". APTRA. for a series on street gang impacts on children and an RTNDA Edward R. Murrow Award for coverage of water issues in California's Owens Valley.
