= Clemente Palacios =

Colombian footballer (born 1993)

Personal information
- Full name: Clemente Palacios Santos
- Date of birth: 24 October 1993 (age 33)
- Place of birth: Carepa, Colombia
- Height: 1.86 m (6 ft 1 in)
- Position: Forward

Team information
- Current team: Alianza Petrolera
- Number: 21

Clemente Palacios Santos (born 24 October 1993) is a Colombian footballer who plays as a forward for Alianza Petrolera in the Categoría Primera A.
