= Tim Clemente =

- Born: Timothy G. Clemente; October 18, 1960 (age 65); San Francisco, California
- Occupations: Screenwriter; Federal Bureau of Investigation; Former SWAT team member

Timothy G. Clemente (born October 18, 1960) is an American counter-terrorism expert who has worked as an FBI Special Agent and SWAT team member in Europe, the Middle East, and Africa. He also ran a cover joint operation with the Department of Energy's National Emergency Support Team, which was tasked with protecting the U.S. from attack by rogue nuclear weapons or other weapons of mass destruction. Clemente went undercover as a drug smuggler and took down members of the Cali Cartel working in narcotics and organized crime investigations in the U.S. and South America.

A 2011 profile by Esquire described Clemente as "an excellent terrorist hunter".

== Education ==
Born in San Francisco, California, Clemente earned a B.A. in International Politics from Fordham University in 1982.

== Career ==
Clemente was a police officer in St. Louis, Missouri from 1982 to 1990. As an FBI Special Agent between 1990 and 2007, Clemente worked as a counterterrorism expert and a SWAT team member, sniper, and tactical instructor. He carried out narcotics and terrorism investigations around the world. In the late 1990s, he was one of the FBI agents who worked on the 1998 U.S. Embassy bombings in Nairobi and Dar es Salaam. On 9/11, he was one of the first FBI agents on the scene after American Airlines Flight 77 crashed into the Pentagon.

Clemente went to Iraq for the first time in January 2004. A 2011 Esquire article described his close friendship with a former member of Saddam's police force whom Clemente trained in Iraq in 2004 to be a terrorist hunter and became, in the view of U.S. experts, "the best terrorist hunter alive." The article depicted the two men's activities in Iraq, hunting down and "turning" terrorists.

=== Military ===
After leaving the FBI, Clemente returned to Iraq in 2007 to serve as an adviser to the U.S. military. He spent eight months in Iraq working as an embedded Counter Improvised Explosive Device Investigator with the U.S. Army 3rd Corps. While in Iraq, he compiled a book of combat photos entitled Courage. In 2008, he worked as an adviser with the 101st Airborne Division at Fort Campbell, Kentucky.

=== Hollywood ===
Clemente retired from active government duty in 2007. Since then, he has worked in Hollywood writing screenplays and serving as a consultant about law enforcement, counterterrorism, and the FBI on films and TV shows. He owns X-G Productions, Inc. and has written several episodes of NCIS: Los Angeles, two episodes of Lie to Me, and an episode of The Unit. He has also appeared on Criminal Minds and The Unit, performed stunts on Criminal Minds and Washington Field, and served as creator and producer of Washington Field, in addition to writing one of its episodes. He has also written for the shows Killer Elite and Blindspot. Since late 2015, he has been a staff writer and technical consultant for Criminal Minds: Beyond Borders.

Clemente also works as an international consultant.

== Professional activities ==
=== HARAS ===
Clemente invented the Height Adjustable Rescue Assault System (HARAS), which uses wide platforms and high traction stairways to ensure easy and safe access to elevated conveyances or structures.

=== Comments on Tsarnaev phone calls ===
During a May 2013 discussion on CNN of the possible role of Boston Marathon bombing suspect Tamerlan Tsarnaev's wife, Catherine Russell, in her husband's actions, Clemente claimed that national security investigators "have ways...to find out exactly what was said in that conversation". Clemente's claim, that the government maintained records of private phone calls, attracted considerable media attention and commentary.

=== Comments on Muslim influx into U.S. ===
In a July 2015 interview, Clemente said that it was impossible for the FBI to cope with the influx into the U.S. of people from the Muslim world who may be terrorists or potential terrorists. He criticized the State Department for allowing students to enter the country without real vetting, and complained that laws prohibit investigation of such individuals unless there is "reasonable suspicion" of their motives for entering the U.S.

== Personal life ==
Clemente and his wife have nine children
