= Visual Communications =

- Founded: 1970
- Founder: Robert A. Nakamura, Duane Kubo, Eddie Wong, Alan Ohashi
- Type: Media Arts
- Purpose: Asian Pacific American community
- Location: Los Angeles, California
- Website: www.vconline.org

Visual Communications (also known as VC) –– is a community-based non-profit media arts organization based in Los Angeles. It was founded in 1970 by independent filmmakers Robert Nakamura, Alan Ohashi, Eddie Wong, and Duane Kubo, who were students of EthnoCommunications, an alternative film school at University of California, Los Angeles. The mission of VC is to "promote intercultural understanding through the creation, presentation, preservation and support of media works by and about Asian Pacific Americans."

Visual Communications works to achieve this mission by creating learning kits, photographing community events, recording oral histories, and collecting historical images of Asian American life. Additionally, it has created films, video productions, community media productions, screening activities, and photographic exhibits and publications. VC also annually presents the Los Angeles Asian Pacific Film Festival, the leading showcase for Asian Pacific American and Asian international cinema in Southern California, and maintains an archive of Asian Pacific American still and moving image holdings.

== History ==
In 1970, Nakamura, Ohashi, Wong, and Kubo, who were influenced by the civil rights and anti-war movements, produced a photographic exhibit on Japanese American internment as VC's first project. In 1971, VC became an independent non-profit organization, which allowed it to receive funding for its programs through the Comprehensive Employment and Training Act (CETA), Emergency School Aid Act (ESAA), and the National Endowment for the Arts (NEA).

Throughout the 1970s and 80s, VC helped create over fifty independent film productions including Chinatown 2-Step, a documentary on the sub urbanization of Chinese American community in Los Angeles and the role of the Chinatown Drum and Bugle Corps; Manong, a film on the first generation of Filipino American immigrants; and Wataridori, a documentary on early Japanese American immigrant pioneers. VC published three books, In Movement: A Pictorial History of Asian Pacific America, Little Tokyo: One Hundred Years in Pictures, and Moving the Image: Independent Asian Pacific American Media Arts.

In the 1980s, VC faced financial issues and a significant loss of staff. The production of a feature length film about the Los Angeles Japanese American community left the organization in debt. Additionally, in the 1980s, President Ronald Reagan's administration began cutting back on funding for arts, culture, education, including funding made available through the ESAA. It fell to two women VC staff members, Linda Mabalot and Nancy Araki, to save VC from bankruptcy. Mabalot and Araki worked to restructure the organization and pull VC out of debt by requiring the monetization of the organization's resources, such as using the photographic dark room, and focusing on smaller scale, more manageable projects. The organization additionally shifted to sponsoring, supporting, and advocating for other Asian American filmmakers in addition to producing its own films.

Mabalot became the executive director of VC in 1985, and under her leadership, in the 1990s, VC transitioned from a film production collective to a media arts center. The organization provided support services like workshops and training's for Asian American artists, filmmakers, and community members, as well as presentation opportunities for independent media. VC currently offers production and training in film making, video and photography for Asian Americans.

== Profile ==
VC's productions have screened in national and international film festivals, and its programs have earned the support of the National Endowment for the Arts, Los Angeles Cultural Affairs, Los Angeles County Arts Commission, California Arts Council, Academy of Motion Picture Arts and Sciences, Arthur M. Blank Family Foundation, Benton Foundation, California Community Foundation, California Wellness Foundation, Eisner Foundation, Entertainment Industry Foundation, Getty Grant Program, Weingart Foundation, and corporate sponsorship's from ABC, AsianAvenue.com, AT&T, Atlantic Richfield Company, Hitachi, Ltd., Screenplay.com, Transamerica Occidental Life, TDK, KNBC and numerous small businesses and community organizations.

== Programs ==
=== Armed With A Camera Fellowship ===
Established in 2002, the Armed With A Camera (AWC) Fellowship for Emerging Media Artists is awarded to a select group of Filmmakers annually. Visual Communications works with the Fellows for seven months and provides special training, mentoring and networking opportunities, access to facilities and equipment plus a stipend to create their digital short films that premiere at the Los Angeles Asian Pacific Film Festival and other venues nationwide. Alumni include Ernesto Foronda (writer of Better Luck Tomorrow and Co-Director of Sunset Stories), Daniel Hsia (director/writer of Shanghai Calling), Evan Jackson Leong (director of 1040 and the Jeremy Lin documentary Linsanity that premiered at the 2013 Sundance Film Festival), Patrick Epino, Nadine Truong, Timothy Tau, Koji Steven Sakai, Erin Li, Kristina Wong, Grace Su, Christopher Woon, William Lu, Jerry Chan, Ted Chung, Anson Ho, Timothy Jieh, Shawn Chou (Tomato & Eggs), Lisa Nguyen, and Aya Tanimura. As of 2013, 100 AWC Fellows have completed the program.

=== Project Catalyst ===
Project Catalyst is an annual filmmaker initiative held during the Los Angeles Asian Pacific Film Festival. A select group of filmmakers of Asian descent are invited to showcase television and/or film projects to Financiers, Producers, Production Companies, Agents, Managers and Industry Executives. Grantees work with VC to develop professional relationships and that include one-on-one meetings, panels and other events that take place during the Los Angeles Asian Pacific Film Festival.

=== The Conference for Creative Content (C3) ===
The Conference for Creative Content (C3) focuses on new media technologies and online platforms as it pertains to the creation and distribution of Asian American media. C3 invites professionals from entertainment, academic, media and technology sectors for a series of discussions, panels and work sessions.

=== Film Development Fund ===
At the 2012 Los Angeles Asian Pacific Film Festival, VC announced the selectees of the VC Film Development Fund, a program which provides Asian Pacific American filmmakers with up to $100,000 towards the development of a micro-budget narrative feature-length film.

=== Fiscal Sponsorship ===
Film, video and radio producers may apply to Visual Communications for non-profit sponsorship of their project. Foundations, corporate, and government funding generally require applicants to have non-profit status to receive grants. As the fiscal agent, VC takes legal and fiduciary responsibility for projects and ensures that the funds are used for charitable activities. VC served as fiscal sponsor for the Oscar-winning short film, Visas and Virtue, from VC alum Chris Tashima.

=== Community Workshops and Education ===
VC provides community workshops and activities that provide opportunities for community’s storytellers and media artists to learn skills. Workshops include Camera & Lighting, Final Cut Pro Editing, Sound and Audio Mixing, Screenwriting, Table Readings and Directing in addition to archives and preservation workshops like personal archives, digital photo asset management, and deterioration.

=== Digital Access and Equipment ===
VC offers a multimedia learning center and workshops in video and multimedia production, aimed towards Asian Pacific media artists, community members and educators, to develop skills and create stories from the Asian Pacific community.

=== Digital Histories ===
Founded in 2003, Digital Histories is a film making mentorship program geared towards primarily ethnic minority senior participants to learn how to use digital film making applications and technologies to produce personal, community and cultural data in the forms of digital narratives, personal stories, and community histories. Visual Communications premieres their films at the Los Angeles Asian Pacific Film Festival.

=== Archives and Media Resource Library ===
VC’s holdings include over 300,000 photographic images, 1,500 titles in the Media Resource Library, 100 films and videos produced by Visual Communications, and over 1,000 hours of oral histories of pan-Asian Pacific American content. The Archives’ purpose is to document the history of the organization by organizing, preserving, and creating access to a variety of media art and primary materials recording political moments and depicting the Asian Pacific American heritage for staff use, as well as by scholars who are interested in Visual Communications’ role in the Asian American communities and history. The Media Resource Library contains nearly all films presented at the past Los Angeles Asian Pacific Film Festivals, and are available for viewing.

The Academy Film Archive houses the Visual Communications Collection, which consists of over 800 items. The archive, in conjunction with Visual Communications, has preserved two films from the collection, China Invaded (1938) and Cruisin' J-Town (1975), in 2007 and 2011, respectively.

== See also ==
- Center for Asian American Media
