= Brian Yang =

Brian Yang may refer to:

- Brian Yang (producer)
- Brian Yang (badminton)
