= Erin Li =

American film producer

Erin Li is a Taiwanese-American filmmaker, writer, director and producer. She has directed and written the short films To The Bone (which screened at the 2013 Slamdance Film Festival and the 2012 Los Angeles Film Festival), L.A. Coffin School (which screened at the 2011 Los Angeles Asian Pacific Film Festival and the 2012 San Francisco International Asian American Film Festival) and others. She has also served as an Associate Producer on the documentaries Iceberg Slim: Portrait of a Pimp (2012), The Girls in the Band (2011), America The Beautiful 2: The Thin Commandments (2011), and Voices Unveiled: Turkish Women Who Dare (2009).

== Films ==
Her short film To The Bone was a Film Independent commissioned film that premiered at the 2013 Slamdance Film Festival as well as the 2012 Los Angeles Film Festival. The film is about a pre-teen migrant farmworker who attempts to rebel against the status quo with unintended consequences for herself and her family.

In addition to To the Bone, Li has also directed a short documentary entitled "Catching the Invisible Light" for the General Electric "Focus Forward" Short Documentary Initiative, which was a Semi-Finalist in the competition. The documentary is about the research done by UCLA Professors Dr. Yang Yang and Dr. Paul Weiss of the California NanoSystems Institute on transparent solar cells.

Li has also directed a short film entitled L.A. Coffin School as a Visual Communications "Armed With A Camera" Fellowship film, which premiered at the 2011 Los Angeles Asian Pacific Film Festival and also screened at the San Francisco International Asian American Film Festival, the BET UrbanWorld Film Festival, and other festivals. The film stars Elizabeth Sung as a once-renowned Chinese painter who is kicked out of her son's home (the son played by Jerry Ying), prompting her to enroll in a controversial school that claims to teach people how to re-evaluate life and what it is worth by contemplating death while in a coffin. The film also stars Michelle Krusiec, Megan Lee, and Angela Ai.

In 2011, Li directed the short film The Big Oh written by Moon Blauner (personal assistant to Helen Hunt) starring Angela Ai, Ryan Caldwell, Bronwyn Cornelius and Angela Thomas, which is about "two single girlfriends try to help their best friend spice up her married sex life." Li has also directed a comedy short film entitled Who is Candy Bernardino? which has screened at a number of film festivals including the Daytona Beach Film Festival, the North Carolina Gay & Lesbian Film Festival, the Downtown Independent Theater in Los Angeles, and more. She has also directed and written a short drama narrative film entitled Pray about three people who each have lost a father in the September 11 attacks and who try to reconcile their faith and belief in religion; the film screened at the Carnegie Mellon University International Film Festival. Among her other films and experimental videos include the short films Prison Break, Mask and BFE (based on a scene from Julia Cho's BFE).

Li has recently finished shooting a sci-fi short film entitled Kepler X-47, which was done as part of the American Film Institute's Directing Workshop for Women.

== Producing ==
Li most recently produced (as an Associate Producer) the feature documentary directed by Jorge Hinosa entitled Iceberg Slim: Portrait of a Pimp (2012), which examines the tumultuous life of legendary Chicago pimp, Iceberg Slim. Ice-T is also one of the film's Executive Producers, and the film has screened at the Toronto International Film Festival (TIFF), Doc NYC, New York's Documentary Film Festival, and more.

Li has also produced (as an Associate Producer and New Media Strategist) the feature documentary directed by Judy Chaikin entitled The Girls in the Band (2011), which chronicles the struggles and triumphs of female jazz musicians from the 1920s to the present. The documentary won an Audience Award for Best Documentary Feature at the Palm Springs International Film Festival, as well as Best Music Documentary from the DOCUTAH Film Festival.

Li has also been an Associate Producer on the feature documentaries America The Beautiful 2: The Thin Commandments (2011) (a documentary on America's obsession with dieting) and Voices Unveiled: Turkish Women Who Dare (2009) (a documentary that juxtaposes the Islamic traditions and Western culture of Istanbul in the lives of three Turkish women).

== Filmography (incomplete list) ==
- Kepler X-47 - short film (11:47)

== Background ==
Li studied painting at the Llotja School of Art and Design in Barcelona, Spain, and is a graduate of Carnegie Mellon University, majoring in business administration and drama and producing short films with PBS, WQED and the school's School of Drama while there.
