= Evan Jackson Leong =

Documentary filmmaker

- Born: Evan Jackson Leong; March 5, 1979 (age 47); Fresno County, California, U.S.
- Other names: Evan Leong
- Education: University of California, Los Angeles (BA)
- Occupations: Director; Filmmaker; Film Producer
- Notable work: 1040: Christianity in the New Asia (2010); Linsanity (2013)
- Website: www.arowanafilms.com

Evan Jackson Leong (born March 5, 1979) is a Chinese-American producer, director, and documentary filmmaker. Leong is known for his documentary Linsanity about Jeremy Lin, which made its world premiere at the 2013 Sundance Film Festival. He has also directed the documentary 1040: Christianity in the New Asia (2010), and the documentary short BLT Genesis (2002), which tracks the behind-the-scenes making of and trajectory of Justin Lin's film, Better Luck Tomorrow.

== Early life ==
Leong is a sixth-generation Chinese American. Leong grew up in the Richmond District, San Francisco, California.

== Education ==
Leong earned a bachelor's degree in Asian American Studies from UCLA. He transferred to UCLA from the University of California, Riverside, where he was a member of the Pi Alpha Phi fraternity.

== Career ==
=== Films and documentaries ===
Leong directed the documentary Linsanity about Jeremy Lin, which screened at the 2013 Sundance Film Festival. The documentary was also produced by Brian Yang as well as Christopher Chen, Allen Lu, Patricia Sun, James D. Stern and Sam Kwok.

The documentary was several years in the making, and Leong started following Lin when he still played basketball at Harvard University. When the film screened at Sundance, it received positive reviews from the Los Angeles Times, The Hollywood Reporter, Variety, and many more publications.

Leong has also directed the feature-length documentary 1040: Christianity in the New Asia (2010), a documentary that chronicles the rapid changes in Asia and the significant shift in the spiritual landscape in the area known as the 10/40 window – the region between 10 and 40 degrees north latitude on the eastern hemisphere.

Leong has also directed, from a script he has written, the 2021 drama Snakehead which was initially slated to star Lucy Liu in a story about the underworld of human smuggling that takes place on the streets of New York City's Chinatown. Later Kickstarter campaigns of the film reveal that the lead actress has been switched from Lucy Liu to Shuya Chang (playing the main character of Sister Tse), and actors such as Sung Kang (playing a character named Rambo) and Jade Wu (playing a character named Dai Mah) have been added to the cast. The film was also produced by Linsanity producer Brian Yang.

Leong directed the 2024 documentary The Bridge, which celebrates East West Bank's 50th anniversary.

=== Short films and music videos ===
Among the other films Leong has directed include the short film, Manivore (2009) (starring Grace Su and C.S. Lee), and the documentary short BLT: Genesis (2002), which chronicles the making of and the rise of Justin Lin's film, Better Luck Tomorrow (2002). Lin is cited as Leong's mentor.

For BLT: Genesis, Leong won a Jury Award for Best Documentary Short at the 2002 San Diego Asian Film Festival. Leong also directed the short film Suckerball 73 as a Visual Communications "Armed with a Camera" fellowship film, which screened at the 2003 Los Angeles Asian Pacific Film Festival (or VC Film Fest as it was known back then). Leong also directed a short documentary entitled Him Mark Lai: The People's Historian (2005) and a short PSA on the Asian Law Caucus entitled Empowering Communities: Asian Law Caucus in Action (2010). Leong also directed the "Fists of Fuhrer" segment in Justin Lin's Finishing the Game starring Roger Fan as Breeze Loo, Nathan Jung as "Bob," Aiko Tanaka, and Nikita Esco (credited as Natalie Susko), with choreography from Don Thai.

Leong's banner is known as Arowana Films. He has also directed a number of music videos that have screened on MTV and other outlets for groups such as Far East Movement (music videos for the tracks "Round Round" and "Satisfaction" on The Fast & The Furious: Tokyo Drift soundtrack; "Western", "Work Bounce" and "Far East Futura"), MC Jin (the tracks "Yum Dom Cha" and "Li Li Luan"/"Li Li Chaos"), Lyrics Born (the tracks "Last Trumpet" and "Bad Dreams"), and Estairy ("Hands Up" also feat. Equipto).

He also co-directed, with Michelle Phan, the Paris-shot Rouge in Love, which has accumulated close to 3 million views on YouTube and was scored by George Shaw.

Leong also used to be a segment producer for MTV News starting from 2010.

=== Producing and other work ===
Leong was a field producer on the political documentary, ...So Goes the Nation (2006) and has also assisted with or worked in the production department of films directed by Justin Lin including Finishing the Game (2007) (Co-Producer, Post Production Coordinator, 2nd Unit Director), The Fast and The Furious: Tokyo Drift (2006) (where he was also Justin Lin's assistant), and Better Luck Tomorrow (2002) (where he was an Assistant Editor and also played the role of the "Slapper's Boyfriend"; he also directed a "behind-the-scenes" short documentary about the film entitled BLT:Genesis). Leong is also a cinematographer and Steadicam operator, having done additional camera work on the documentary short Spotlighting (2005) directed by Justin Lin.
