= Nadine Truong =

American film director

- Born: Germany
- Education: University of California, Los Angeles (BA); AFI Conservatory (MFA)
- Occupation(s): Film director, screenwriter
- Children: 2

Nadine Truong is a director, writer and photographer. She received her MFA in directing from the American Film Institute Conservatory.

== Short films ==
Her directorial credits include Chopsticks (which was premiered at the 2007 Vietnamese International Film Festival), The Muse (a dramatic short produced under the Visual Communications' "Armed with a Camera" Fellowship for Emerging Media Artists) which was also screened at the Los Angeles Asian Pacific Film Festival and which was nominated for the VC Golden Reel Award for Best Narrative Short Film, One Never Knows, Mine, Sushi, Eggbaby (2009), Shadow Man (2009) and Initiation (2009), which stars David Lee McInnis, Christopher Dinh, Tim Chiou, Kathy Uyen and Jerry Ying.

Truong is the recipient of The George C. Lin Emerging Filmmaker Award from the San Diego Asian Film Festival in 2010, for her short films Shadow Man and Eggbaby, and a recipient of a Visual Communications "Armed With A Camera" Fellowship for Emerging Media Artists in 2007, which she used to create the short film The Muse. Truong also received a Mary Pickford Scholarship for Excellence in Directing from The American Film Institute.

== Feature films ==
=== Someone I Used to Know ===
Truong directed her first feature film in 2012 previously titled nightdreamblues but was re-titled Someone I Used to Know, written by West Liang, and starring Brian Yang, Eddie Mui, Emily Chang, West Liang, Tzi Ma and Diana Lee Inosanto. The film was premiered at the 2013 CAAMFest, formerly known as the San Francisco International Asian American Film Festival, and was described as "a bittersweet drama" that is "a new-millennium remix of such classic eighties' ensemble dramas as The Breakfast Club and St. Elmo's Fire." It was also screened at the 2013 Los Angeles Asian Pacific Film Festival and the 2013 Asian American International Film Festival in New York City, drawing further comparisons to the films Less than Zero, The Anniversary Party and Who's Afraid of Virginia Woolf?.

=== Senior Project ===
In 2013, Truong directed a feature film entitled Senior Project, written by a 16-year-old Hong Kong high school student named Jeremy Lin (not the basketball player). Fabienne Wen and her daughter Ellie Wen (who wrote and produced Quentin Lee's White Frog) produced the film through their banner Itsy Bitsy Productions, along with Stephane Gauger (Saigon Electric) and Yaron Kaplan. The film stars Ryan Potter (who plays the main character, Mike Fukanaga on Nickelodeon's Supah Ninjas) as the primary protagonist, "Peter", Vanessa Marano (ABC Family's Switched at Birth) as "Sam", Meaghan Martin (the main character, Jo, in Mean Girls 2, ABC's 10 Things I Hate About You) as "Natalia", Sterling Beaumon (Lost, Red Widow) as "Spencer", Kyle Massey (That's So Raven, Cory in the House) as "Andy", the YouTube star Lana McKissack as "Jill" and the stand-up comedian and actor Margaret Cho as "Ms. Ghetty".

=== I Can I Will I Did ===
In 2017, Truong wrote and directed the feature film I Can I Will I Did about a depressed foster youth named Ben (Mike Faist of Challengers, Westside Story, Dear Evan Hansen) who is bullied and, as a result, eventually is in a car accident. His recovery process is slow, until he meets Adrienne, a fellow patient at the hospital who breathes hope into his life and introduces him to her grandfather, taekwondo master Kang (Ik Jo Kang). Kang not only teaches him how to walk and has him back on his feet, but also how to take charge of his own life. Ik Jo Kang is also a taekwondo master in real-life. The film won an Audience Award at the 2017 Asian American International Film Festival and also Best Feature and Best Supporting Actress (Selenis Leyva) at the 2017 Sunscreen Film Festival.

== Background ==
Truong was born in Germany and now lives in Los Angeles. She received a B.A. degree in anthropology from UCLA and a MFA in directing at the American Film Institute. Truong is married to the actor and producer Brian Yang.
