= Good TV =

Taiwanese Christian television channel

GOOD TV
- Type: Nonprofit organization
- Industry: Cable and satellite religious broadcasting
- Founded: 1997
- Headquarters: New Taipei City, Taiwan, Republic of China (Taiwan)
- Products: Christian programming, educational programming, video on demand
- Number of employees: ~200
- Parent: Gabriel Evangelical Broadcasting Foundation
- Website: http://www.goodtv.tv/

GOOD TV (Chinese: 好消息電視台) (stylized in all uppercase), is a Christian television station in Taiwan. Established in 1997 as a nonprofit organization under Gabriel Evangelical Broadcasting Foundation, it began broadcast on September 9, 1998. The executive director of programming is Pastor Shao-en Koh, and its spokesman was the belated former actor Sun Yueh.

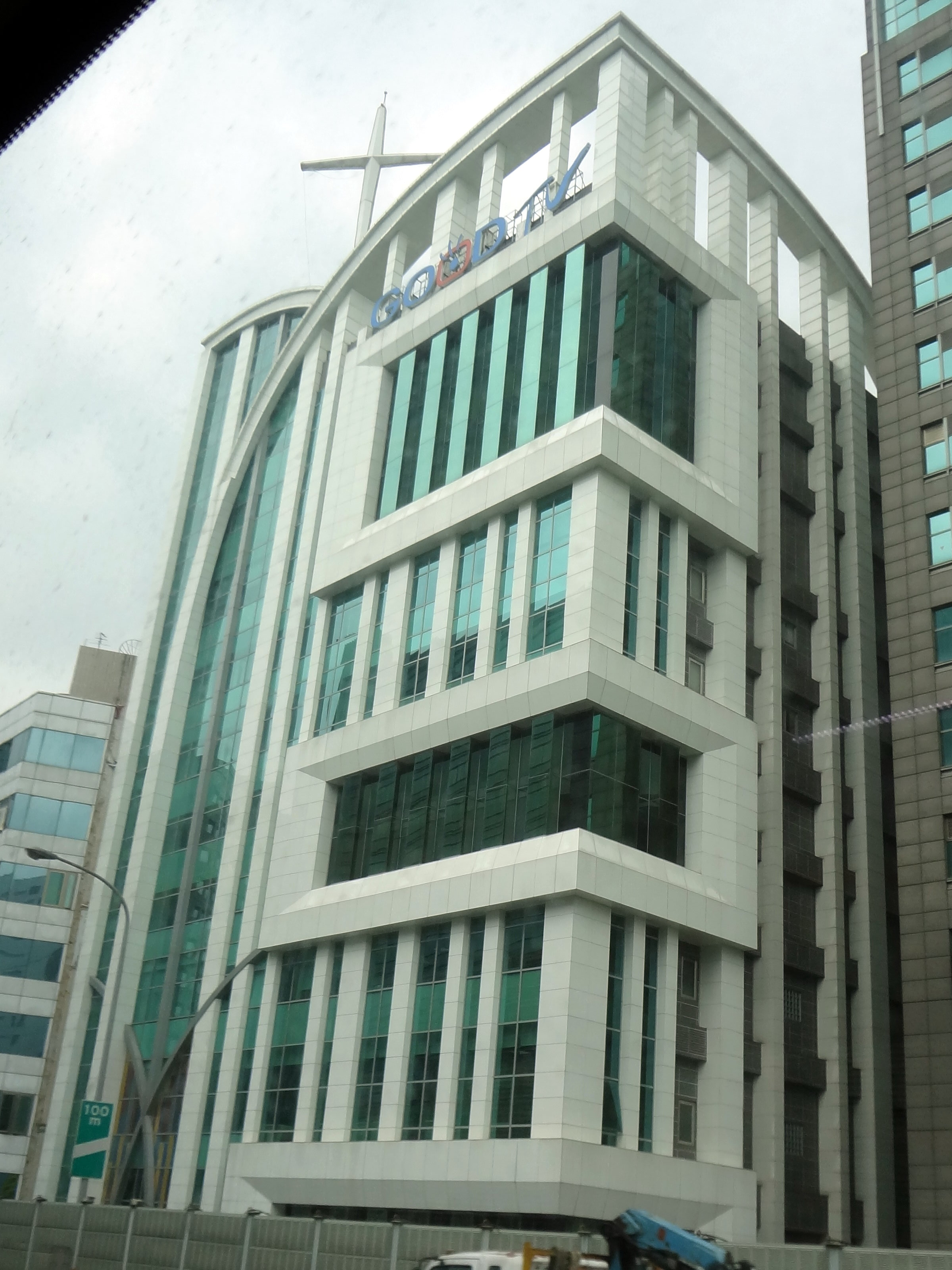
Good TV Station Building

On July 1, 2012, Good TV moved from the Public Television Service building in Taipei's Neihu District to New Taipei City's Zhonghe District.

== Channels ==
Good TV operates two channels, Good TV, and Good TV 2 (logo as "Good 2").

Good TV Variety Channel
- Country: Republic of China (Taiwan)
- Broadcast area: Taiwan, worldwide via online

Programming
- Language: Mandarin Chinese

Ownership
- Owner: Gabriel Evangelical Broadcasting Foundation

History
- Launched: September 9, 1998
- Former names: Good TV 1

Links
- Website: www.goodtv.tv

=== Good TV Variety Channel ===
The Good TV Channel ("Variety Channel" in Chinese) broadcasts programs of general interest, including shows on family relationships, children's topics, food and lifestyle, science, sermons, Christian news, and Christian testimonies.

Originally named "Good TV 1", it broadcasts throughout Taiwan and began broadcast on September 9, 1998 on Channel 15 HD in Taiwan's cable television systems. On July 12, 2012, starting at 9:00 AM Taiwan Time, the station on Chunghwa Telecom's MOD Channel 3 switched to HD broadcast signal.

Good TV 2
- Country: Republic of China (Taiwan)
- Broadcast area: Taiwan, United States, worldwide via online
- Network: Good TV

Ownership
- Owner: Gabriel Evangelical Broadcasting Foundation

History
- Launched: July 31, 2009

Links
- Website: www.goodtv.tv

=== Good TV 2 ===
Good TV 2 (identified as "GOOD 2" on screen) focuses on Biblical teachings, sermons, and testimonies of Christians who share their stories about their life transformation before and after Christian conversion.

The station originally broadcast mainly outside of Taiwan, serving overseas Chinese diaspora. Now it serves both domestic and worldwide audiences.

On August 30, 2005, Republic of China's (Taiwan's) Executive Yuan Satellite TV Review Commission approved Good TV 2's application for broadcast. Four years later, Good TV 2 began broadcast at noon on July 31, 2009, at Chunghwa Telecom MOD Channel 15, replacing Good TV 1.

In October 2012, Good TV 2's Chinese name changed to "Good TV Truth Channel", and became available on the 15th that month on digital Channel 212 on cable providers Kbro (凱擘大寬頻) and Taiwan Fixed Network (TFN, 台灣固網).

Beginning February 1, 2018, the station became available on digital channel 131 on cable TV systems operated by China Network Systems (中嘉寬頻公司).

== Programming ==
Among its many programs are shows on Christian life, Biblical teachings and sermons from Taiwan and overseas, including the United States, and interviews and testimonials by Christian celebrities, pastors and theologians, and lay Christians.

When foreign programs are in non-Chinese languages, translated Chinese subtitles are provided on screen. In addition, many programs, particularly sermons, Sunday worship services, and televangelism programs from the U.S. are usually dubbed into Mandarin Chinese.

One of its popular programs is "Real Sentiments Blog" (Chinese: 真情部落格), and has featured testimonies of Taiwanese badminton player Chou Tien-chen and Taiwanese American basketball player Jeremy Lin.
