= Brian Yang (producer) =

American actor and producer (born 1973)

- Born: October 28, 1973 (age 52); Columbus, Ohio, United States
- Education: University of California, Berkeley
- Occupations: Actor, producer
- Known for: Charlie Fong (Hawaii Five-0)
- Spouse: Nadine Truong
- Children: 2

Brian Yang
- Chinese: 楊明燊
Transcriptions
Standard Mandarin
- Hanyu Pinyin: Yáng Míngshēn

Brian Yang (born October 28, 1973) is an American actor and producer, most known for his role as Charlie Fong in Hawaii Five-0.

== Personal life ==
Yang was born in 1973 and grew up in Columbus, Ohio. Yang was raised in the Bay Area, and attended the University of California, Berkeley, where he studied biology and dramatic arts. His parents are immigrants from Taiwan. He speaks English and Mandarin.

Yang is married to filmmaker Nadine Truong.

== Film and television work ==
In addition to playing Charlie Fong on Hawaii Five-0, Yang has also starred in films such as The Man with the Iron Fists as Hyena, Quentin Lee's The People I've Slept With as Jefferson (Archie Kao)'s right-hand man (and was also an Executive Producer of the film), Alice Wu's Saving Face as Little Yu, Joan Chen's love interest, Michael Kang's West 32nd as Jahnkeh, and in an upcoming film, Someone I Used to Know, directed by Nadine Truong and written by West Liang, which he also produced. Yang was also the host of a reality show in China called Shanghai Rush.

== Producing work ==
In addition to being a producer on Quentin Lee's The People I've Slept With (executive producer) and Nadine Truong's Someone I Used to Know (producer), Yang is also a producer of the 2012 Jeremy Lin documentary directed by Evan Jackson Leong, Linsanity, which premiered at the 2013 Sundance Film Festival. Yang also served as an Executive Producer on Kit Hui's 2010 film, Fog, set during the 10th anniversary of Hong Kong's reunification with China.

At the 2013 Asian American International Film Festival in New York, Yang received the Rémy Martin Asian American Achievement Award in Film and Television, awarded to "an individual who has made a significant contribution to the Asian American arts community through film and television. As someone who has been involved in the media industry for over 10 years, Brian Yang has been recognized for his perseverance and his work in Hawaii Five-O and Linsanity."

In 2014, Yang produced a web series entitled Annie Undocumented, directed by Daniel Hsia, written by Elaine Low (based on her own true story), and starring Nikki SooHoo as a teenage girl who discovers she's undocumented while trying to get her driver's license. The series won the Best Short-Form Web Series award in the Independent Pilot Competition at the New York Television Festival.

Yang produced with his 408 Films the drama Snakehead, directed and written by Evan Jackson Leong, and which initially was to star Lucy Liu (but now Shuya Chang) in a story about the underworld of human smuggling that takes place on the streets of New York City's Chinatown.
