= Linsanity (film) =

- Theatrical release poster
- Directed by: Evan Jackson Leong
- Produced by: Christopher Chen; Allen Lu; Patricia Sun; James D. Stern; Sam Kwok; Brian Yang
- Starring: Jeremy Lin
- Narrated by: Daniel Dae Kim
- Cinematography: Evan Jackson Leong
- Music by: The Newton Brothers
- Production companies: Arowana Films; 408 Films
- Distributed by: Ketchup Entertainment
- Release dates: January 20, 2013 (Sundance); March 14, 2013 (CAAMFest); October 4, 2013 (US release)
- Running time: 88 minutes
- Country: United States
- Languages: English; Mandarin
- Box office: $298,178

Linsanity is a 2013 American documentary film about the rise of Asian-American basketball player Jeremy Lin. The film was directed by Evan Jackson Leong.

The film traces Lin's life from his childhood in Palo Alto, California to his rise to prominence in 2012 with the New York Knicks in the National Basketball Association (NBA). It shows him overcoming discouragements and racism and achieving success through his faith and desire. The New York Times wrote that it also offered a rare view of Christianity among Asian Americans. Leong had filmed Lin since he was a star college basketball player at Harvard University and during his early struggles in the NBA. The film is narrated by actor Daniel Dae Kim. The documentary shows Lin predicting in 2011 that he would "become a rotation player, become a starting point guard and then win an NBA championship." He eventually won an NBA title with the Toronto Raptors in 2019.

== Release ==
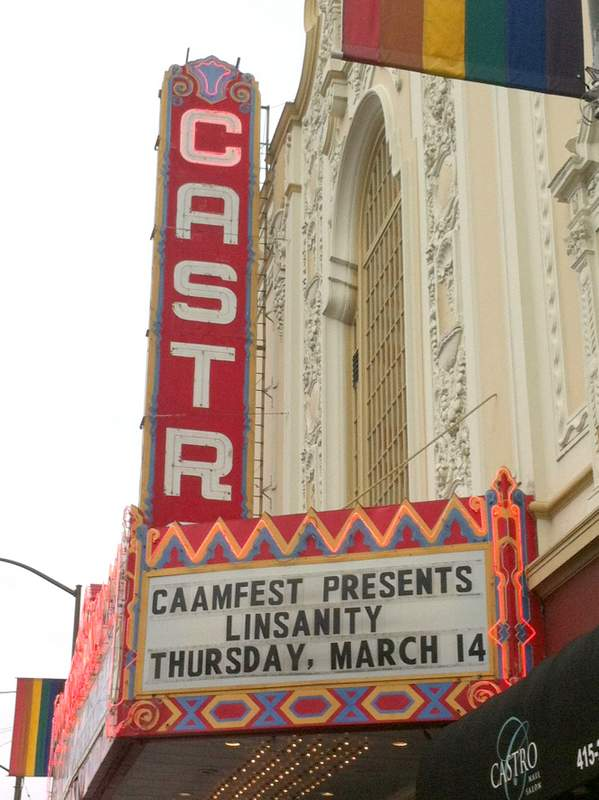
Linsanity was shown at opening night of CAAMFest in 2013 in San Francisco.

Linsanity premiered to a sold-out screening at the 2013 Sundance Film Festival on January 20, 2013. The Los Angeles Times wrote that it received a "rousing response, easily making it one of the most crowd-pleasing documentaries to play the festival this year." Linsanity was the opening night film for the CAAMFest film festival in San Francisico, where it opened to a sellout on March 14. It made its Asian premiere on March 30 in a sold-out screening at the Hong Kong International Film Festival. The film also opened the Los Angeles Asian Pacific Film Festival on May 2.

The film's distribution in the United States was being handled by Creative Artists Agency, while Fortissimo Films obtained the international distribution rights. Ketchup Entertainment, a Los Angeles-based distribution company, picked up US distribution rights for Linsanity on July 24, 2013. Stephen Stanley of Ketchup negotiated the deal with Nick Ogiony and Dan Steinman of CAA, Gregory Schenz at Endgame Entertainment and Helen Dooley at Williams & Connolly. The film was shown at art houses, and was subsequently made available for download and DVD.

== Reception ==
=== Critical reception ===
On Rotten Tomatoes, the film has an approval rating of 65% based on 26 reviews, with an average rating of 5.60/10. The site's critical consensus reads, "Linsanity offers a compelling enough look at its basketball star subject for fans and curious viewers, even if it never really delves below the surface." On Metacritic, the film has a score of 52 out of 100 based on 13 critics, indicating "mixed or average" reviews.

== See also ==
- List of basketball films
