= Yang Yang (scientist) =

Taiwanese-American Scientist

- 楊陽
- Born: 1958 (age 67–68); Taiwan
- Education: National Cheng Kung University (BS); University of Massachusetts, Lowell (MS, PhD)
- Scientific career
- Fields: Applied physics Materials science
- Workplaces: University of California, Los Angeles
- Thesis: Photoinduced charge carrier generation and transport in polydiacetylene single crystals (1992)
- Doctoral advisor: Jayant Kumar; Sukant K. Tripathy
- Website: yylab.seas.ucla.edu

Yang Yang (simplified Chinese: 杨阳; traditional Chinese: 楊陽; pinyin: Yáng Yáng; born 1958) is a Taiwanese-American materials scientist. He is a distinguished professor of materials science and engineering, chair of the Department of Materials Science and Engineering, and professor of bioengineering at the University of California, Los Angeles, where he holds the Carol and Lawrence E. Tannas Jr. Endowed Chair in Engineering.

Yang is known for his contributions to polymer organic solar cells and lead-halide perovskite solar cells. He was named as one of the "World's Most Influential Scientific Minds" by Thomson Reuters in 2016. In 2024, he was elected a member of Academia Sinica and named a fellow of the National Academy of Inventors. Yang is a fellow of the American Association for the Advancement of Science, American Physical Society, Materials Research Society, Royal Society of Chemistry, and Society of Photo-Optical Instrumentation Engineers.

== Early life and education ==
Yang was born in 1958 in Taiwan, growing up in the countryside before moving to Taipei with his family at the age of ten. He earned a B.S. in physics from National Cheng Kung University in 1982. After graduation, he served two years of military service, a mandatory policy for qualified males in Taiwan.

In 1985, Yang moved to the United States to begin graduate studies at the University of Massachusetts, Lowell. During his graduate studies, Yang changed research groups and fields multiple times for personal reasons. Initially Yang worked on studying the nonlinear optical photorefractive effect in barium titanate crystals in the Department of Physics, earning his M.S. in Physics and Applied Physics in 1988. He then continued his graduate studies, using deep-level transient spectroscopy to study charge carrier traps in polycrystalline silicon solar cells in the Department of Electrical Engineering. Yang later transitioned to research on the physical properties of conductive polymers in the Department of Chemistry, earning his Ph.D. in Physics and Applied Physics in 1992 under the supervision of Prof. Jayant Kumar and Prof. Sukant K. Tripathy. Yang's Ph.D. thesis was titled Photoinduced charge carrier generation and transport in polydiacetylene single crystals.

== Career ==
After graduating with his Ph.D. in 1992, Yang worked as a researcher at UNIAX Corporation in Santa Barbara, California (now DuPont Display Materials) from 1992 to 1996. His research there addressed polymer light-emitting electrochemical cells, conductive polymer electrodes, polymer grid triodes, and organic transistors.

Yang began his independent academic career in 1997 as an assistant professor of materials science and engineering at the University of California, Los Angeles. He was promoted to associate professor in 1998 and full professor in 2002. His appointment to the Carol and Lawrence E. Tannas Jr. Endowed Chair in Engineering was announced in 2010, and he has held the chair since 2011. He became a UCLA distinguished professor in 2019 and began serving as chair of the Department of Materials Science and Engineering in 2024.

From July 2019 to October 2020, Yang served as Guoqiang Chair Professor and founding dean of the School of Engineering at Westlake University in Hangzhou, China.

Yang is the founder of MoleculaX Inc., a materials research company focused on perovskite solar cells, incorporated in 2023 and based in Pasadena, California.

== Research ==
=== Organic electronics and photovoltaics ===
Yang's early research concerned the operation and fabrication of polymer electronic devices. This work included polymer light-emitting electrochemical cells, the formation of junctions in conjugated-polymer films, polyaniline electrodes, and vertically configured organic transistors.

In 1994, Yang and Alan J. Heeger described a vertical polymer-transistor architecture. In a separate study that year, they reported that transparent anodes containing conductive polyaniline, either alone or with indium tin oxide, reduced the operating voltage and increased the quantum efficiency of polymer light-emitting diodes compared with devices using indium tin oxide alone. Work reported in 1995 and 1996 described polymer light-emitting electrochemical cells and the in situ formation of a light-emitting p–n junction. At UCLA, Yang also worked on inkjet-processed polymer light-emitting devices and organic non-volatile memory based on nanoparticle–polymer films.

His research on organic solar cells has examined active-layer morphology, donor and acceptor materials, charge transport, interface layers, transparent electrodes, and device architecture. A 2005 paper from his group related the performance of solution-processed polymer solar cells to self-organization in polymer blends.

In collaboration with researchers at the National Renewable Energy Laboratory, a 2006 study examined methods for measuring current–voltage characteristics under standard test conditions, including corrections for spectral mismatch. Yang's group subsequently reported an inverted polymer solar cell using a low-temperature-processed cesium carbonate interlayer and later extended the architecture to tandem cells using a metal-oxide interconnection layer. Other work addressed flexible and semitransparent organic photovoltaic devices, including applications in which light transmission is required.

Yang's research also included near-infrared-absorbing materials for organic photovoltaics. In 2013, Yang and collaborators reported a tandem polymer solar cell that paired materials with complementary absorption spectra, including a low-band gap polymer with a spectral response extending to 900 nm; the device achieved a certified power-conversion efficiency of 10.6%. A 2019 study led by Yang reported the near-infrared-absorbing non-fullerene acceptors Y1 and Y2. Devices using these materials had reported efficiencies of approximately 13.4%, with one device independently certified at 12.6%. Subsequent reviews placed these materials within the broader development of Y-series non-fullerene electron acceptors and discussed molecular-design strategies for extending near-infrared absorption and narrowing the optical band gap.

=== Perovskite and tandem photovoltaics ===
Yang's group began work on metal-halide perovskite solar cells around 2013. Its research has focused on materials processing, interface engineering, defect states, crystal growth, ion migration, and device stability.

A 2014 study combined controlled perovskite-film formation with yttrium-doped titanium dioxide and a polymer-modified indium tin oxide electrode. The authors reported a peak power-conversion efficiency of approximately 19.3% under reverse-bias scanning for a planar device produced through low-temperature solution processing.

Yang's later research also included inverted p–i–n perovskite devices. A 2016 paper coauthored by Yang reported a solution-processed cell using nickel oxide and zinc oxide as the hole- and electron-transport layers, respectively. Reviews of the field describe the inverted p–i–n perovskite architecture as originating in designs developed for organic solar cells.

The group has also combined perovskite absorbers with other photovoltaic technologies. In 2018, Yang and collaborators reported a monolithic tandem device combining a perovskite top cell with a copper indium gallium selenide solar cell. Later work examined wide-bandgap perovskites and stacked tandem configurations.

Subsequent studies investigated surface-defect passivation, phase and interface stability, and the relationship between nucleation, strain, and photovoltaic performance.

=== Other electronic materials ===
Yang has studied solution-processed metal-oxide thin-film transistors for displays, biosensors, and wearable electronics. In collaboration with UCLA chemist Richard Kaner, he also worked on solution methods for processing large graphene sheets, including their use in transparent conductors.

== Awards and memberships ==
Yang is a highly cited researcher, and has been ranked a Highly Cited Researcher by Clarivate/Thomson Reuters since at least 2015. His work has been featured on mainstream news outlets such as NPR, Bloomberg, Time Magazine, USA Today, the LA Times, and the New York Times. Other awards that Yang has received include:

- Fellow of the Society of Photo-Optical Instrumentation Engineers (2014)
- Fellow of the Royal Society of Chemistry (2015)
- Fellow of the Materials Research Society (2015)
- Fellow of the American Physical Society (2015)
- Named one of "World's Most Influential Scientific Minds" by Thomson Reuters (2016)
- Distinguished Achievement Award, Chinese-American Engineers and Scientists Association of Southern California (2016)
- Distinguished Alumni Award, National Cheng-Kung University (2016)
- Sustainable Energy Award of the Royal Society of Chemistry (2019)
- Fellow of the American Association for the Advancement of Science (2019)
- Member of Academia Sinica (2024)
- Fellow of the National Academy of Inventors (2024)
