= 1040 (film) =

- Directed by: Evan Jackson Leong
- Produced by: Anson Ho
- Starring: Jaeson Ma; MC Hammer; Jin Au-Yeung; Van Ness Wu; Mike Bickle; Jinusean; Steve Douglass; Cindy Jacobs
- Edited by: Greg Louie
- Release date: 12 March 2010 (City of the Angels)
- Country: United States
- Language: English

1040 is a documentary film about Christianity in the "10/40 Window". Directed by Evan Jackson Leong, the film is narrated by musician Jaeson Ma, who travels to several countries including China, South Korea, and Singapore. Ma describes the growth of Christianity in Asia as one of the greatest Christian Revivals in history.
