= Jeremy Lin =

American basketball player (born 1988)

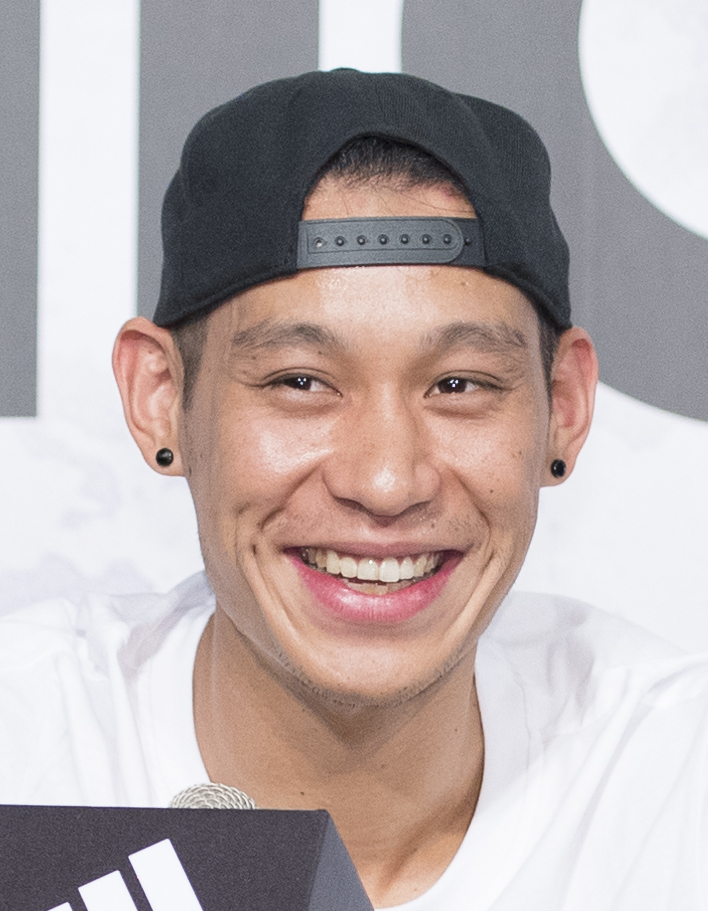
- Lin in 2017

Personal information
- Born: August 23, 1988 (age 38) Torrance, California, U.S.
- Listed height: 6 ft 3 in (1.91 m)
- Listed weight: 200 lb (91 kg)

Career information
- High school: Palo Alto (Palo Alto, California)
- College: Harvard (2006–2010)
- NBA draft: 2010: undrafted
- Playing career: 2010–2025
- Position: Point guard / shooting guard
- Number: 7, 17

Career history
- 2010–2011: Golden State Warriors
- 2010–2011: →Reno Bighorns
- 2011: Dongguan Leopards
- 2011–2012: New York Knicks
- 2012: →Erie BayHawks
- 2012–2014: Houston Rockets
- 2014–2015: Los Angeles Lakers
- 2015–2016: Charlotte Hornets
- 2016–2018: Brooklyn Nets
- 2018–2019: Atlanta Hawks
- 2019: Toronto Raptors
- 2019–2020: Beijing Ducks
- 2021: Santa Cruz Warriors
- 2021–2022: Beijing Ducks
- 2022: Guangzhou Loong Lions
- 2023: Kaohsiung 17LIVE Steelers
- 2023–2025: New Taipei Kings

Career highlights
- NBA champion (2019); TPBL champion (2025); PLG champion (2024); TPBL Finals MVP (2025); TPBL Most Valuable Player (2025); All-TPBL First Team (2025); TPBL Clutch Play of the Year (2025); TPBL All-Defensive First Team (2025); PLG assists leader (2023); CBA All-Star (2020); No. 7 retired by New Taipei Kings; 2× First-team All-Ivy League (2009, 2010); Second-team All-Ivy League (2008)

Career statistics
- Points: 5,567 (11.6 ppg)
- Rebounds: 1,338 (2.8 rpg)
- Assists: 2,042 (4.3 apg)
- Stats at NBA.com
- Stats at Basketball Reference

Jeremy Lin
- Traditional Chinese: 林書豪
- Simplified Chinese: 林书豪
Transcriptions
Standard Mandarin
- Hanyu Pinyin: Lín Shūháo
- Bopomofo: ㄌㄧㄣˊ ㄕㄨ ㄏㄠˊ
- Wade–Giles: Lin^{2} Shu^{1}-Hao^{2}
- IPA: [lǐn ʂúxǎʊ]
Yue: Cantonese
- Jyutping: Lam4 Syu1 Hou4
Southern Min
- Hokkien POJ: Lîm Su-hô

Jeremy Shu-How Lin (Chinese: 林書豪; pinyin: Lín Shūháo; born August 23, 1988) is a Taiwanese and American former professional basketball player. He unexpectedly led a winning turnaround with the New York Knicks of the National Basketball Association (NBA) during the 2011–12 season, sparking a cultural phenomenon known as "Linsanity". Lin is the first American of Chinese or Taiwanese descent to play in the NBA, and is one of the few Asian Americans to have played in the league. He is also the first Asian American player to win an NBA championship, having done so with the Toronto Raptors in 2019.

Born to a Taiwanese American family, Lin grew up in the San Francisco Bay Area and earned honors as a senior in high school. After receiving no athletic scholarship offers, he attended Harvard University, where he was a three-time all-conference player in the Ivy League. Undrafted out of college, Lin signed with his hometown Golden State Warriors in 2010. He seldom played in his rookie season and received assignments to the NBA Development League (now NBA G League). In 2011, Lin was waived by both the Warriors and the Houston Rockets before joining the New York Knicks early in 2011–12.

At first, Lin played sparingly for the Knicks, and he again spent time in the development league. In February 2012, however, he was promoted to the starting lineup and led the team on a seven-game winning streak. Lin's stellar play during the season helped the Knicks make the 2012 playoffs; it also catapulted him to international fame. Lin appeared on the covers of Sports Illustrated and Time and was named to the Time 100 as one of the most influential people in the world. In July 2012, Lin won the ESPY Award for Breakthrough Athlete of the Year.

Following his Knicks tenure, Lin played for the Houston Rockets, Los Angeles Lakers, Charlotte Hornets, Brooklyn Nets, Atlanta Hawks, and Toronto Raptors. While he experienced some success in Houston and Charlotte, he battled injuries in the ensuing seasons. In August 2019, he left the NBA and signed with the Beijing Ducks, where he became an All-Star in the Chinese Basketball Association (CBA). Attempting to return to the NBA, Lin played with the Warriors' development team in 2021. He returned to the CBA and played with the Ducks and later the Guangzhou Loong Lions. He left the Loong Lions midseason in 2022–23 and joined Kaohsiung 17LIVE Steelers of the P. League+ (PLG) in 2023. Lin would lead the PLG in assists that season. He signed with the New Taipei Kings in 2023, winning the PLG championship in 2024 and the Taiwan Professional Basketball League (TPBL) championship in 2025.

== Early life ==
Lin was born to a Taiwanese American family in Torrance, California on August 23, 1988. He was raised a Christian in the Bay Area city of Palo Alto, California. His parents, Gie-Ming Lin and Shirley Lin (née Xinxin Wu), emigrated from Taiwan to the United States in the mid-1970s, first settling in Virginia before moving to Indiana, where they both attended universities to study engineering and computer science. They are dual nationals of Taiwan and the U.S. Lin's paternal family are Hoklo people from Beidou, Changhua, Taiwan, while his maternal grandmother emigrated to Taiwan in the late 1940s from Pinghu, Zhejiang, China.

Lin's parents are both 5 feet 6 inches (1.68 m) tall. His maternal grandmother's family was tall, and her father was over 6 feet 0 inches (1.83 m). Lin has an older brother, Josh, and a younger brother, Joseph. Gie-Ming taught his sons to play basketball at the local YMCA. Shirley helped form a National Junior Basketball program in Palo Alto where Lin played. She worked with coaches to ensure his playing did not affect his academic performance. She was criticized by her friends for letting Lin play so much basketball, but let him play the game he enjoyed.

During his senior year in 2005–06, Lin captained Palo Alto High School—coached by 2006 Cal-Hi Sports State Coach of the Year Peter Diepenbrock—to a 32–1 record and upset the nationally ranked Mater Dei, 51–47, for the California Interscholastic Federation Division II state title. He was named first-team All-State and Northern California Division II Player of the Year, and ended his senior year averaging 15.1 points, 7.1 assists, 6.2 rebounds, and 5.0 steals.

== College career ==
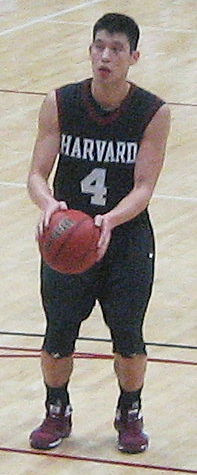
Lin in college in 2010

Lin sent his résumé and a DVD of highlights of his high school basketball career to all of the Ivy League schools; the University of California, Berkeley; and his dream schools, Stanford University and the University of California, Los Angeles (UCLA). The Pac-10 (now Pac-12) schools wanted him to walk on rather than be actively recruited or offered an athletic scholarship. Harvard and Brown were the only teams that guaranteed him a spot on their teams, but Ivy League schools do not offer sports scholarships. University of San Francisco men's basketball coach and retired NBA player Rex Walters said NCAA limits on coaches' recruiting visits had reduced Lin's chances: "Most colleges start recruiting a guy in the first five minutes they see him because he runs really fast, jumps really high, does the quick, easy thing to evaluate".

Harvard assistant coach Bill Holden was initially unimpressed with Lin's on-court abilities and told Lin's high school basketball coach, Peter Diepenbrock, that Lin was a "Division III player". Later Holden saw Lin playing in a much more competitive game, driving to the basket at every opportunity with the "instincts of a killer", and he became Harvard's top recruit. Its coaches feared that Stanford—across the street from his high school—would offer Lin a scholarship, but it did not, and Lin chose to attend Harvard. Golden State Warriors owner and Stanford booster Joe Lacob said Stanford's failure to recruit Lin "was really stupid. The kid was right across the street. [If] you can't recognize that, you've got a problem." Kerry Keating, a UCLA assistant who had offered Lin the opportunity to walk on, said in hindsight that Lin would probably have become a starting point guard for UCLA.

A Harvard coach remembered Lin in his freshman season as "the [physically] weakest guy on the team", but in his sophomore season (2007–08), Lin averaged 12.6 points and was named to the All-Ivy League Second Team. By his junior year during the 2008–09 season, he was the only NCAA Division I men's basketball player ranked in the top ten in his conference for scoring (17.8), rebounding (5.5), assists (4.3), steals (2.4), blocked shots (0.6), field goal percentage (0.502), free throw percentage (0.744), and three-point shot percentage (0.400), and was a consensus selection for the All-Ivy League First Team. He had 27 points, 6 rebounds, and 8 assists in an 82–70 win over the 17th-ranked Boston College Eagles, three days after the Eagles defeated No. 1 North Carolina.

In his senior year (2009–10), Lin averaged 16.4 points, 4.4 rebounds, 4.5 assists, 2.4 steals, and 1.1 blocks, and was again a unanimous selection for the All-Ivy League First Team. He was one of 30 midseason candidates for the John R. Wooden Award and one of 11 finalists for the Bob Cousy Award. He was also invited to the Portsmouth Invitational Tournament. Fran Fraschilla of ESPN named Lin one of the 12 most versatile players in college basketball. Lin gained national attention for his performance against the 12th-ranked Connecticut Huskies, when he scored a career-high 30 points and grabbed 9 rebounds on the road. After the game, Hall of Fame Connecticut coach Jim Calhoun said of Lin: "I've seen a lot of teams come through here, and he could play for any of them. He's got great, great composure on the court. He knows how to play."

For the season, Harvard set numerous program records including wins (21), non-conference wins (11), home wins (11) and road/neutral wins (10). Lin finished his career as the first player in the history of the Ivy League to record at least 1,450 points (1,483), 450 rebounds (487), 400 assists (406) and 200 steals (225). He graduated from Harvard in 2010 with a degree in economics and a 3.1 grade-point average.

== Professional career ==
=== Golden State Warriors (2010–2011) ===
No team chose Lin in the 2010 NBA draft. Scouts saw what The New York Times later described as "a smart passer with a flawed jump shot and a thin frame, who might not have the strength and athleticism to defend, create his own shot or finish at the rim in the NBA." Lin joined the Dallas Mavericks for mini-camp as well as their NBA Summer League team in Las Vegas. Donnie Nelson of the Mavericks was the only general manager who offered him an invitation to play in the Summer League. "Donnie took care of me," said Lin. "He has a different type of vision than most people do."

In five Summer League games, while playing both guard positions, Lin averaged 9.8 points, 3.2 rebounds, and 1.8 assists in 18.6 minutes per game and shot a team-leading 54.5% from the floor. He subsequently received offers from the Mavericks, Golden State Warriors, Los Angeles Lakers, and an unnamed Eastern Conference team.

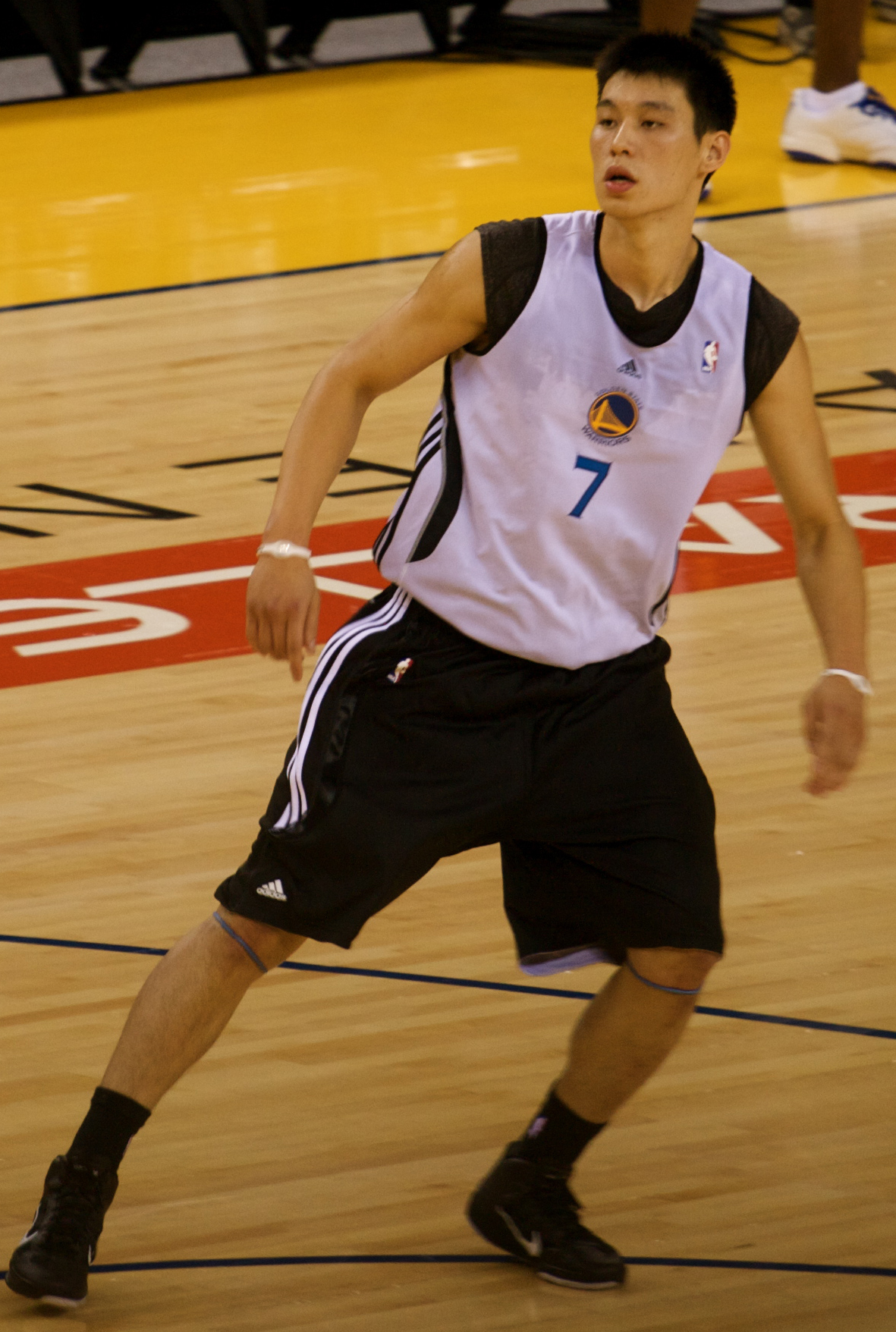
Lin at Warriors practice in 2010

On July 21, 2010, Lin signed a two-year deal with his hometown Warriors. Lin's deal was partially guaranteed for the 2010–11 NBA season, and the Warriors held a team option for the second season. Lin also signed a three-year guaranteed contract with Nike.

The Warriors held a post-signing press conference that drew national media. "It was surprising to see that ... for an undrafted rookie," said then-Warriors coach Keith Smart. The San Jose Mercury News wrote that Lin "had something of a cult following" after his signing. The San Francisco Bay Area, with its large Asian-American population, celebrated his arrival. He became the first American of Chinese or Taiwanese descent to play in the NBA.

Lin was appreciative of the support he received from fans, especially from the Asian-American community, but he preferred to concentrate on his play. Lin started the regular season on the Warriors' inactive list, but made his NBA debut the next game during the Warriors' Asian Heritage Night. He received a standing ovation when he entered the game in the final minutes. In the next game against the Los Angeles Lakers, Lin scored his first NBA basket, had three assists, and recorded four steals. He played 11 of his 16 minutes in the third quarter and committed five fouls but played a role in a 12–1 run by the Warriors in a 107–83 loss to the defending NBA champions. At Toronto on November 8, the Raptors held Asian Heritage Night to coincide with Lin's visit with the Warriors. Over 20 members of Toronto's Chinese media covered the game.

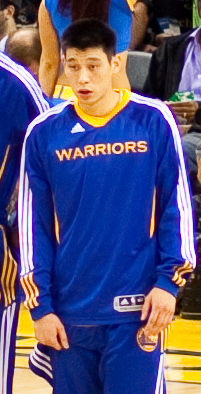
Lin before a game in 2010

Lin received little playing time during the season behind Stephen Curry and Monta Ellis, two dominant ball-handling guards. Three times, he was assigned to the Warriors' NBA Development League (D-League) affiliate, the Reno Bighorns, then later recalled by the Warriors. He competed in the NBA D-League Showcase and was named to the All-NBA D-League Showcase First Team on January 14, 2011. In 20 games, he averaged 18 points, 5.8 rebounds and 4.4 assists with Reno.

The Warriors saw Lin as a potential backup for Curry. Lacob said the team received more than one trade offer for Lin while he was in the D-League: "He's a minimum, inexpensive asset. You need to look at him as a developing asset. Is he going to be a superstar? No." He finished his rookie NBA season averaging 2.6 points on 38.9 percent shooting in 29 games.

=== Dongguan Leopards (2011) ===
Lin recovered from a patellar ligament injury to his knee during the 2011 NBA lockout. In September 2011, Lin played a few games for the Chinese Basketball Association (CBA) club Dongguan Leopards at the ABA Club Championship in Guangzhou, China, where he was named the MVP of the tournament.

=== New York Knicks (2011–2012) ===
During the offseason, Lin worked to improve his jump shot by abandoning the shooting form he had used since the eighth grade. He also increased his strength, doubling the weight he could squat (from 110 pounds (50 kg) to 231 pounds (105 kg)) and almost tripling the number of pull-ups that he could do (from 12 to 30). He increased his body weight from 200 pounds (91 kg) to 212 (96), including 15 pounds (6.8 kg) of muscle. He added 3.5 inches (8.9 cm) to his standing vertical jump and 6 inches (15 cm) to his running vertical jump, and improved his lateral quickness by 32 percent. Due to the lockout, he never got a chance to work out for new Warriors coach Mark Jackson. On the first day of training camp on December 9, 2011, the Warriors waived Lin to free up salary cap space to make an offer to restricted free agent center DeAndre Jordan; Lin was due to make almost $800,000 that would have become fully guaranteed on February 10, 2012.

Lin was claimed off of waivers by the Houston Rockets on December 12, 2011, and played seven minutes in two pre-season games in Houston. Houston already had point guards Kyle Lowry, Goran Dragić and Jonny Flynn, and all three had guaranteed contracts. The Rockets waived Lin on December 24, before the start of the season, to clear payroll to sign center Samuel Dalembert.

==== Rise of "Linsanity" (2011–2012) ====
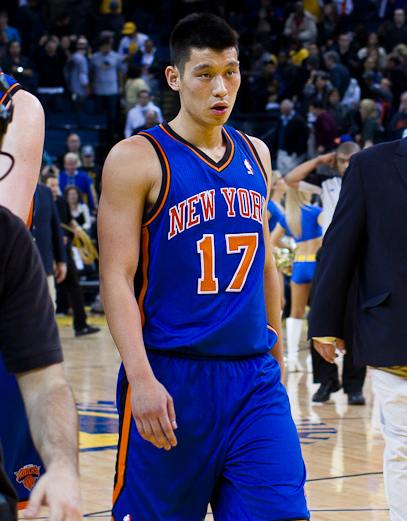
Lin after his first game for the Knicks in December 2011

The New York Knicks waived point guard Chauncey Billups for cap space to sign center Tyson Chandler. On December 27, after an injury to guard Iman Shumpert, the team claimed Lin off of waivers to be a backup behind Toney Douglas and Mike Bibby. Recently signed guard Baron Davis had also been injured, and was weeks away from being able to play. Because of the lockout, coaches had little opportunity to see Lin's play, and placed him fourth on the point guard depth chart. Lin stated that he was "competing for a backup spot", adding that people saw him "as the 12th to 15th guy on the roster"; he continued to arrive first at practice and leave last, intensely studied game film, and worked with coaches to improve his footwork and judgment.

Lin made his season debut with the Knicks on the road against the Warriors, where he was cheered in his return to Oracle Arena. In January, Lin was assigned to the Erie BayHawks of the D-League, and on January 20, he recorded a triple-double with 28 points, 11 rebounds, and 12 assists in the BayHawks' 122–113 victory over the Maine Red Claws. Three days later, Lin was recalled by the Knicks, but was so fearful of being cut again that he asked a chaplain at a pregame prayer service to pray for him.

On January 28, Davis postponed his Knicks debut due to an elbow infection and back pain. Contemplating signing another player, the Knicks were considering releasing Lin. However, after New York squandered a fourth quarter lead in a February 3 loss to the Boston Celtics, coach Mike D'Antoni—in desperation, according to experts—decided to give Lin a chance to play. "He got lucky because we were playing so bad", said the coach; three point guards had failed to run D'Antoni's offense, and fans demanded the team fire him. Lin had played only 55 minutes through the Knicks' first 23 games, and the team had lost 11 of its last 13 games; however, he unexpectedly led a Knicks resurgence.

On February 4, against the New Jersey Nets and All-Star guard Deron Williams, Lin had 25 points, five rebounds, and seven assists—all career highs—in a 99–92 Knicks victory. Teammate Carmelo Anthony suggested to D'Antoni at halftime that Lin should play more in the second half. After the game, D'Antoni said Lin had a point-guard mentality and "a rhyme and a reason for what he is doing out there". In the subsequent game against the Utah Jazz, Lin made his first career start, playing without stars Anthony (who left the game due to injury) and Amar'e Stoudemire (whose older brother had died). Upon Lin's promotion to the starting lineup, the Knicks went on a seven-game winning streak. Lin had 28 points and eight assists in the Knicks' 99–88 win. Stoudemire and Anthony missed the next three and seven games, respectively. D'Antoni said after the Jazz game that he intended to ride Lin—still not in the media guide—"like freakin' Secretariat".

Players playing that well don't usually come out of nowhere. It seems like they come out of nowhere, but if you can go back and take a look, his skill level was probably there from the beginning. It probably just went unnoticed.

— Kobe Bryant, after Lin scored 38 points on February 10, 2012.

In a 107–93 win over the Washington Wizards, Lin played against John Wall and had 23 points and 10 assists, his first double-double. On February 10, Lin scored a new career-high 38 points and had seven assists, leading the Knicks in their 92–85 victory over the Los Angeles Lakers. He outscored the Lakers' Kobe Bryant, who had 34 points. The New York Times wondered if Lin was "the Knicks' grandest stroke of fortune" since drafting Patrick Ewing in the 1985 NBA draft. On February 11, Lin scored 20 points and had eight assists in a narrow 100–98 victory over the Minnesota Timberwolves, making a go-ahead free throw with 4.9 seconds left in the game. Lin was named the Eastern Conference Player of the Week after averaging 27.3 points, 8.3 assists and 2.0 steals in four starts; the Knicks went undefeated during those four games.

On February 14, with less than a second remaining in the game, Lin made a game-winning three-pointer in the Knicks' 90–87 win over Toronto. The basket was so amazing to the Lakers watching on television that veteran player Metta World Peace ran past reporters shouting "Linsanity! Linsanity!" and waving his hands above his head. Lin became the first NBA player to score at least 20 points and have seven assists in each of his first five starts. Lin scored a total of 89, 109, and 136 points in his first three, four, and five career starts, respectively; all three totals at the time were the most by any player since the merger between the American Basketball Association (ABA) and the NBA in 1976–77.

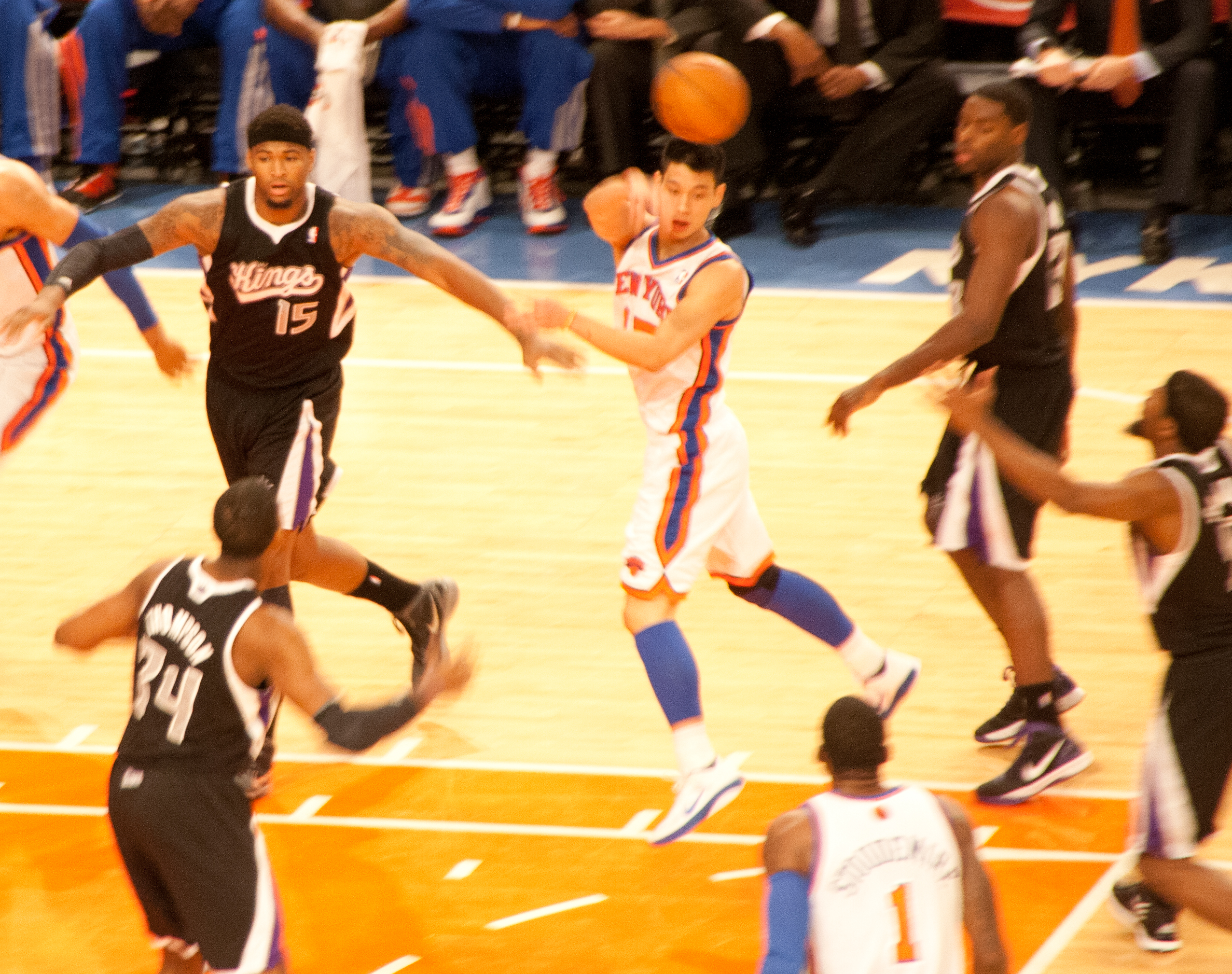
Lin passing against the Sacramento Kings

In the following game against the Sacramento Kings, Lin recorded 13 assists and led the Knicks back to a .500 record with a 100–85 win. The team's seven-game winning streak ended in an 89–85 loss to the New Orleans Hornets; Lin scored 26 points, but had nine turnovers. His 45 turnovers in his first seven career starts were the most since individual turnovers began being tracked in 1977–78.

On February 19, in a 104–97 win against the Mavericks, Lin scored 28 points and tallied career highs with 14 assists and five steals. USA Today wrote: "No matter what Dallas threw at Lin – double-teams, traps, blitzes, tall defenders ... smaller defenders ... stocky, thin – Lin found a way ... to a victory against the defending NBA champions". He did not do as well against the Miami Heat, shooting one for 11 from the field and committing eight turnovers. LeBron James, Dwyane Wade, Chris Bosh, and the rest of the eventual NBA champions focused their entire defense on Lin, an experience he described as "flattering—and terrifying ... I felt like they were all like hawks circling me and staring".

The craze surrounding Lin's sudden ascendancy became known as "Linsanity". In his 12 starts before the All-Star break, Lin averaged 22.5 points and 8.7 assists per game, and New York had a 9–3 record. He played in the Rising Stars Challenge during NBA All-Star Weekend. He was omitted from the original Rising Stars roster, but was added after his sudden ascent to stardom. Some media outlets—including USA Today, Los Angeles Times, and CBSSports.com—stated that he deserved to play in the All-Star Game.

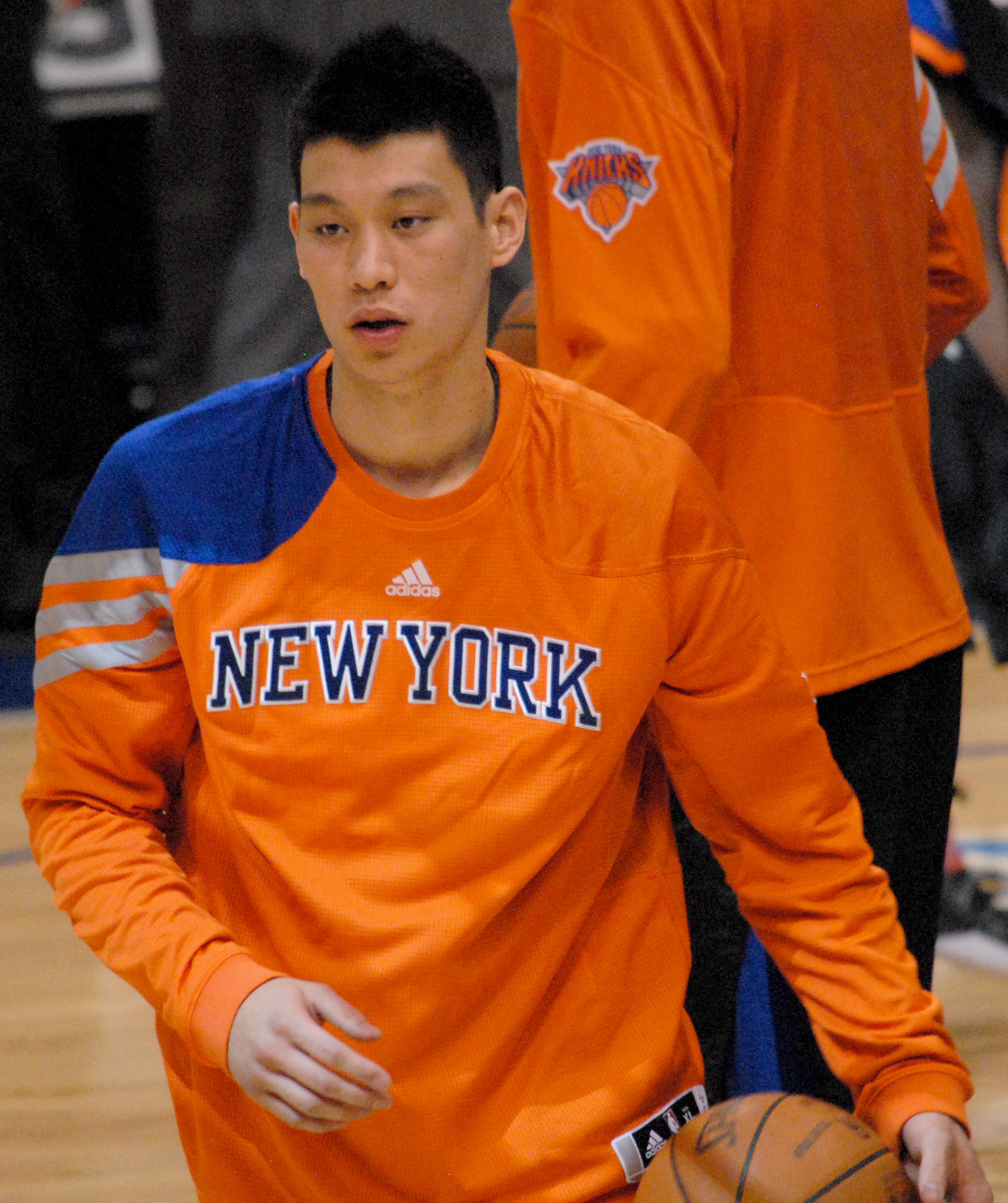
Lin in March 2012

In March, the Knicks replaced D'Antoni with coach Mike Woodson, who ran fewer pick-and rolls and more isolation plays. Lin had excelled at running pick-and-rolls under D'Antoni. After a March 24 game against the Detroit Pistons, Lin complained about a sore knee, and an MRI later revealed a small meniscus tear in the left knee. Lin opted to have knee surgery and missed the remainder of the regular season. He averaged 18.5 points and 7.6 assists during his 26 games as an everyday player; during that period, the team went 16–10. The Knicks finished the season with a 36–30 record and earned the seventh seed in the Eastern Conference playoffs. Without the injured Lin, they were defeated by the eventual NBA champion Miami Heat in the first round of the playoffs in five games. Lin finished sixth in voting for the NBA Most Improved Player Award.

Lin became a restricted free agent at the end of the season. The New York Times called Lin "[the Knicks'] most popular player in a decade" and asserted that he had saved the team's season. However, his success over only 26 games left teams uncertain about his overall standing among the league's point guards; some still believed Lin was a bench player.

In July 2016, former Knicks coach Mike D'Antoni recalled that some players on the Knicks resented Lin during the Linsanity period, an account corroborated by Lin's former Knicks teammate Amar'e Stoudemire.

=== Houston Rockets (2012–2014) ===
==== Starting role (2012–2013) ====
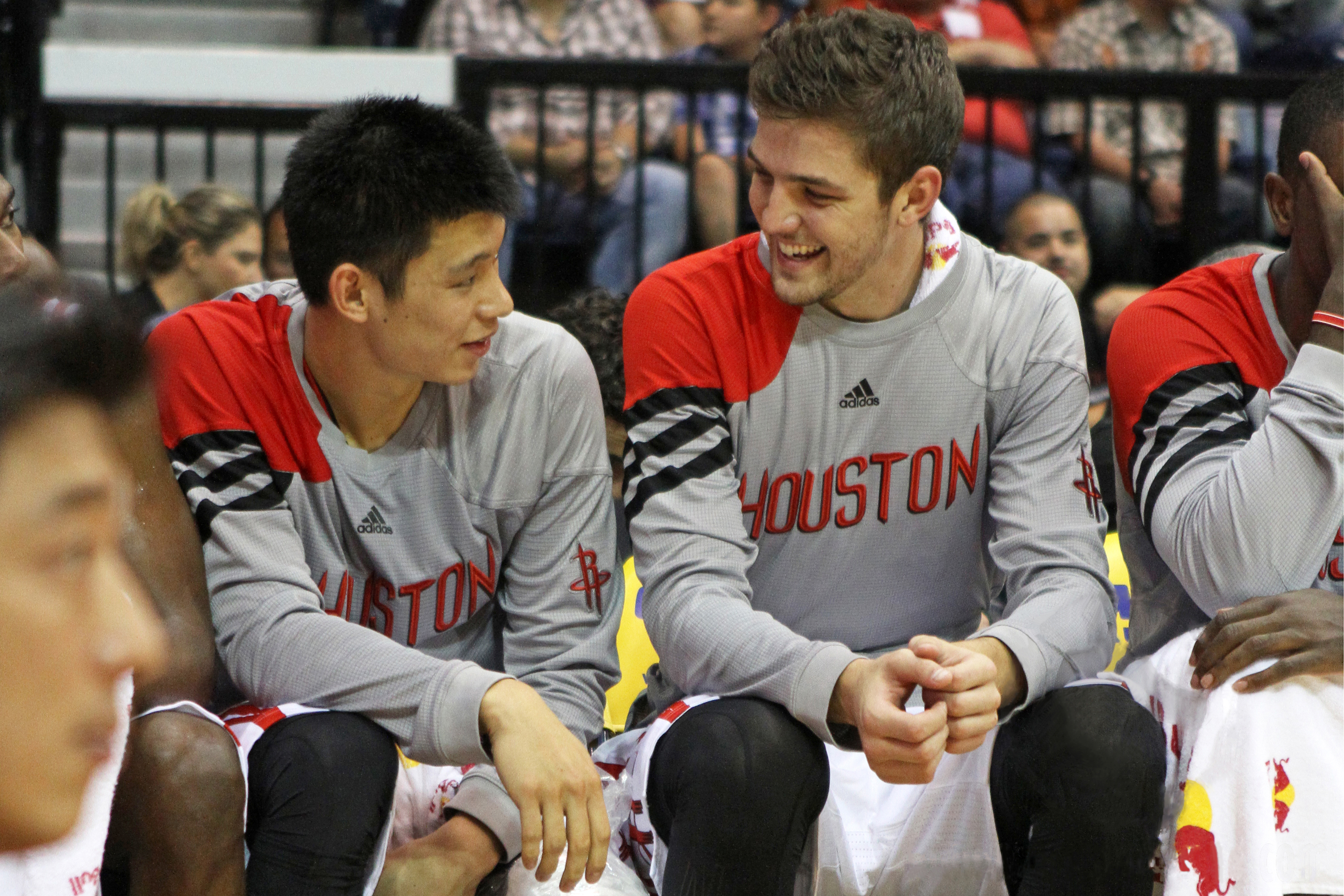
Lin and Chandler Parsons on the Houston bench

During the 2012 offseason, the Knicks encouraged Lin to seek other offers, but he and the press expected that the team would re-sign him given its need for a young guard, his good play, and worldwide popularity; ESPN reported that the Knicks would match any other offer "up to $1 billion". The Rockets offered a $28.8 million contract over four years with the fourth year of that deal being at the team's option, which put the true commitment at $19.5 million. Woodson said the Knicks would match Houston's offer and that Lin would be his starting point guard. The Rockets then offered a revised three-year, $25 million deal, which Anthony called "ridiculous". The Knicks did not match the deal, and Lin deduced the team's decision when they signed Raymond Felton instead. The first two years of Houston's offer paid $5 million and $5.225 million, respectively, followed by $14.8 million in the third year. The higher salary in the final year, known as a "poison pill", was intended to discourage New York from matching the offer. Their failure to match the offer surprised observers, given the team's history of high payrolls; Lin would have been the fourth-highest-paid Knick.

The Rockets made Lin the center of both their preseason "A New Age" publicity campaign as well as their initial ads on Comcast SportsNet Houston. Coming off his "Linsanity" performance in New York, Houston coach Kevin McHale said the expectations of Lin were undue. McHale said the public believed Lin would "average 28 [points] and 11 [assists]", but he had never played a whole 82-game season before. Shortly before their regular-season opener in October, the Rockets acquired James Harden, who supplanted Lin as the face of the team. Harden was a ball-dominant, pick-and-roll player like Lin, and McHale chose to have the offense run through the more-proven Harden.

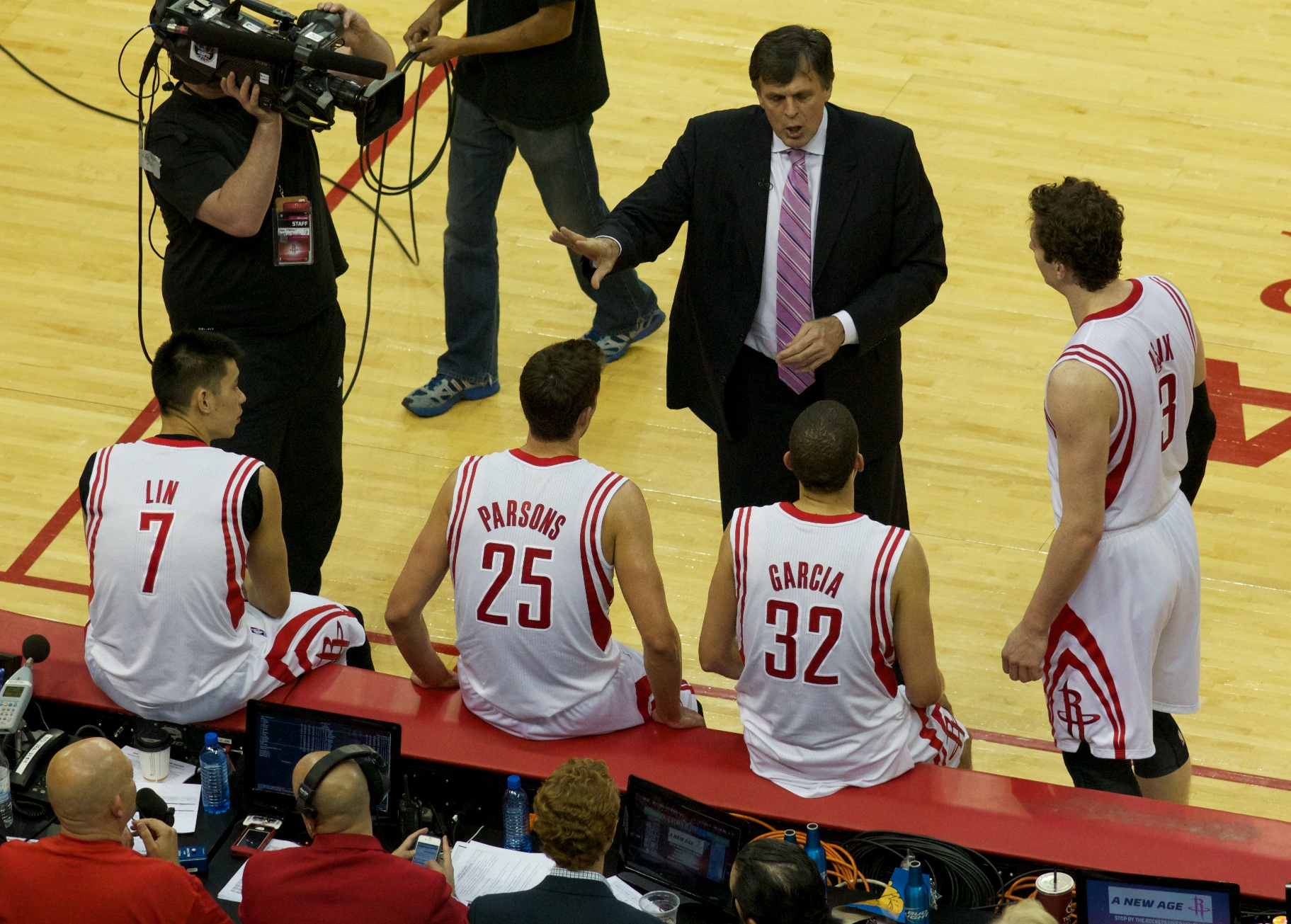
Rockets coach Kevin McHale speaks to Lin (No. 7) and his teammates during the 2013 NBA playoffs

Lin struggled at the beginning of the season and began losing playing time to backup Toney Douglas. With Harden sitting out due to injury on December 10, Lin scored 38 points in a 134–126 overtime loss to the San Antonio Spurs. The performance was reminiscent of his play during Linsanity. Numbers through the season suggested that Harden and Lin were more productive individually with the other on the bench. "I'll be my harshest critic but I'll go ahead and say it: I'm doing terrible," Lin said before facing the Knicks in his first game back in New York. On December 17, Houston defeated the Knicks 109–96, handing the Knicks their first home loss in 11 games. Lin had 22 points and nine assists. He was cheered in pregame introductions, but was booed after the game began.

Lin did not play in the 2013 All-Star Game, held in Houston, after finishing third behind Bryant and Chris Paul in the voting for guards of the Western Conference. (Note: Bryant led all NBA players with 1,591,437 votes, while Paul had 929,155, ahead of Lin with 883,809.) He was selected instead to compete in the Skills Challenge during All-Star Weekend. His scoring, shooting percentage, and 3-point percentage improved after the All-Star break, and in February 2013, The New York Times reported that he was "fitting in well" with the Rockets. Lin finished the season with averages of 13.4 points and 6.1 assists per game. Houston qualified for the playoffs, but lost in the first round in six games to the No. 1 seed Oklahoma City Thunder. Lin suffered a bruised chest in Game 2, which limited him in Game 3 and sidelined him for the two games after. He returned for the final game, coming off the bench for three points in 13 minutes.

==== Career-high percentage year (2013–2014) ====
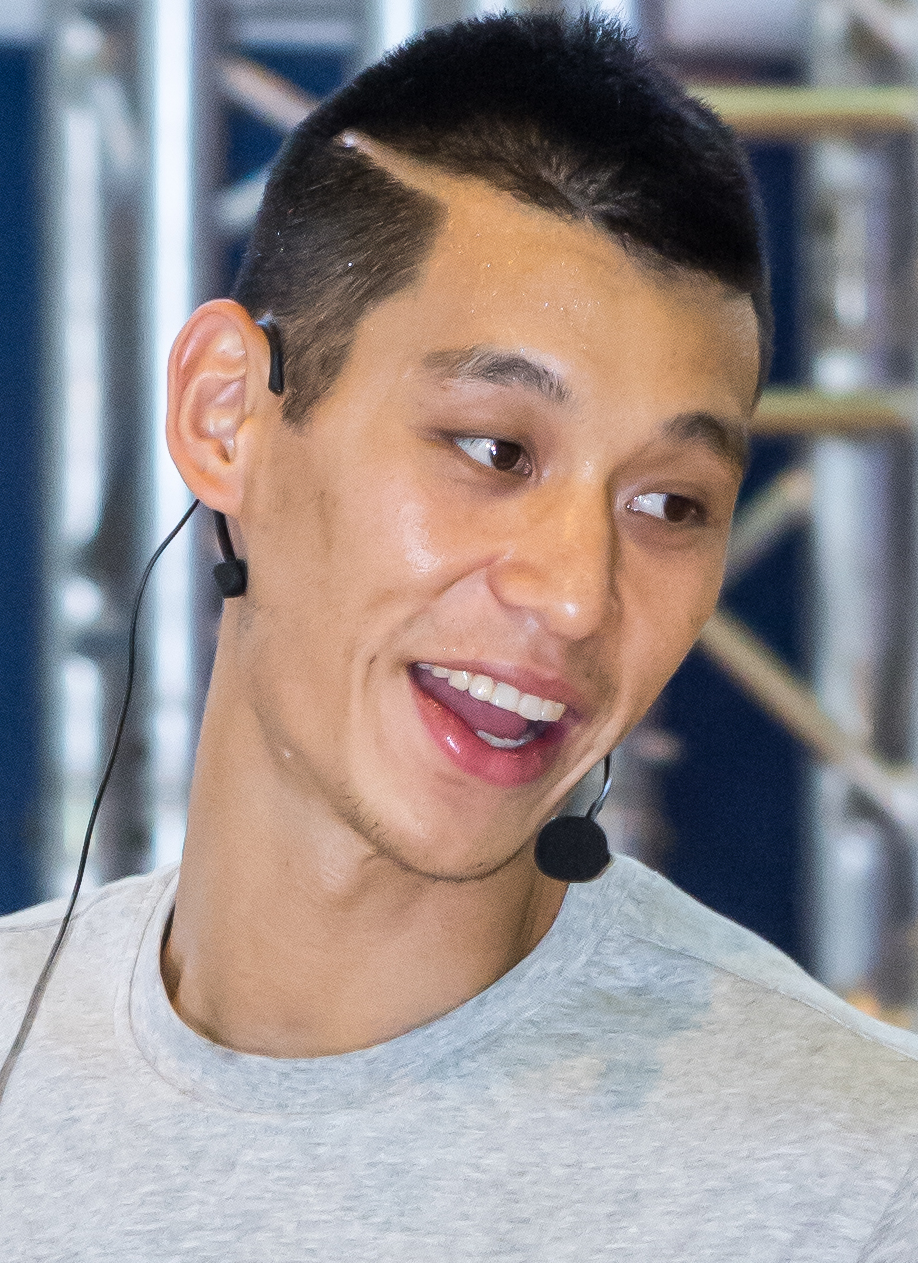
Lin in 2014

In 2013–14, Lin was replaced in the Rockets' starting lineup by Patrick Beverley. Lin became the second unit's primary ball handler and scoring option as the team's sixth man. In November, Lin established the highest two-game scoring total of his career, 65 points, including season-highs of 34 points and 11 assists along with a Rockets record-tying nine three-pointers in a start in place of an injured Harden. Lin followed this with a 21-point performance in a win at New York. On November 27, Lin sprained his right knee against the Atlanta Hawks; he missed six games with the injury. He missed four additional games in December due to back spasms. On February 1, 2014, Lin recorded 15 points, 11 rebounds and 10 assists—his first career triple-double—in 29 minutes off the bench in a 106–92 home victory over the Cleveland Cavaliers. However, he went into a shooting slump after the All-Star break, and again experienced problems with his back.

Lin finished the season with 33 starts and averages of 12.5 points and 4.1 assists per game along with career highs in field goal percentage (44.6%), three-point percentage (35.8%), and free throw percentage (82.3%). In the playoffs, Lin averaged 11.3 points off the bench as Houston lost in six games to the Portland Trail Blazers. He scored 21 points in a Game Five win that extended the Rockets' season. During the offseason, the Rockets pursued Lin's former Knicks teammate Carmelo Anthony in free agency and showed images outside its arena of Anthony in a Houston jersey bearing Lin's No. 7.

=== Los Angeles Lakers (2014–2015) ===
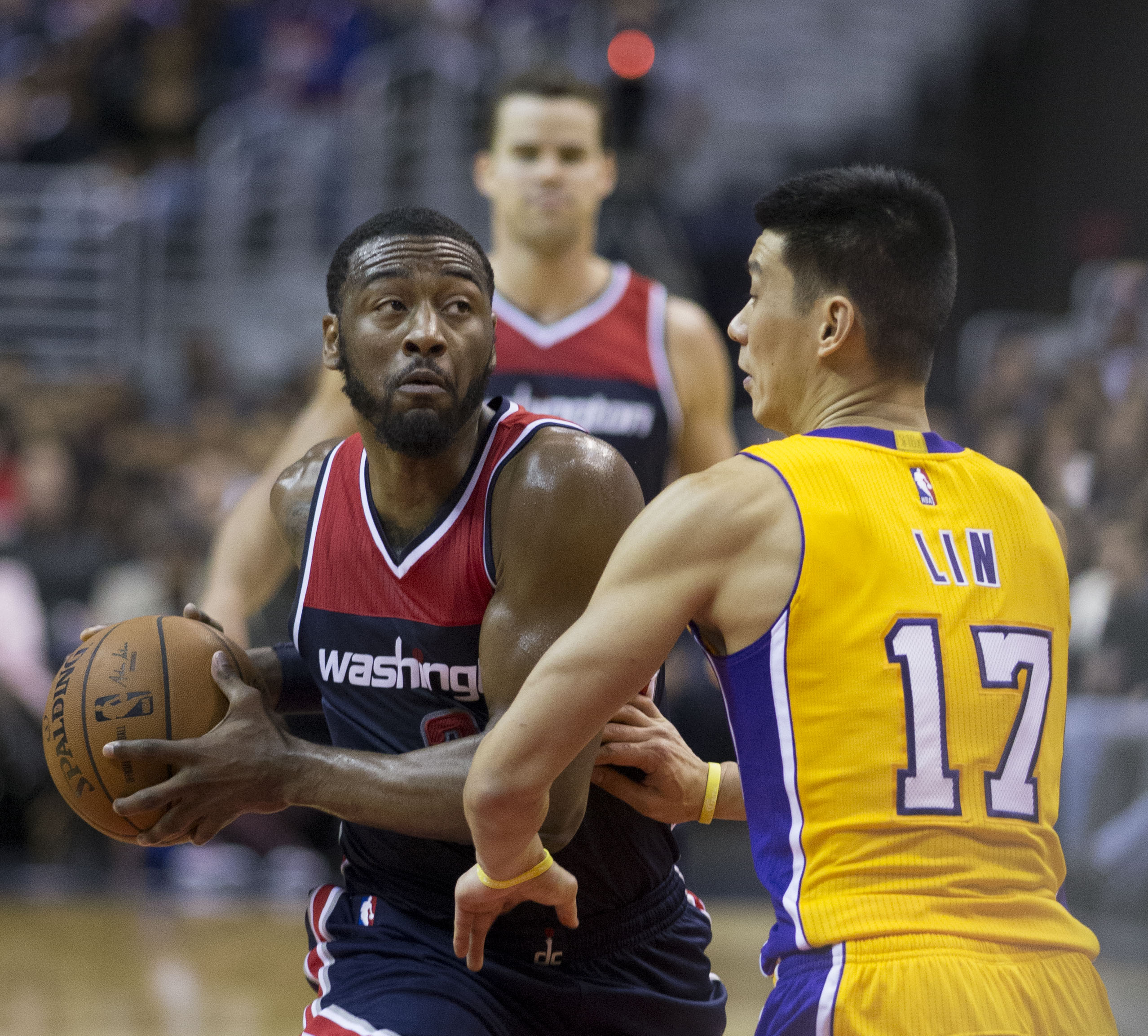
Lin defending against John Wall of the Washington Wizards

On July 13, 2014, Lin was traded, along with a first-round draft pick and a second-round draft pick, to the Los Angeles Lakers in exchange for the rights to Serhiy Lishchuk. The Rockets made the move to clear cap space in their attempt to sign free agent Chris Bosh. Lin shot a career-high 36.9 percent on his three-pointers during the season, but his role was undefined with the Lakers, who were just 21–61 in his only season with the team.

Lin moved into the starting lineup late in the preseason after an injury to Ronnie Price, and he started the first 20 games of the season. However, he struggled in coach Byron Scott's offense, which was based on the methodical player and ball movement of the Princeton offense. Lin was most comfortable dominating the ball while attacking off the pick-and-roll as he did in New York and Houston. After the team's poor 5–15 start, Scott attempted to improve the Lakers' poor defense by moving Lin to the bench in favor of the journeyman Price. Lin was disappointed in the demotion, calling it "one of the toughest situations I've been in". On January 23, 2015, Scott promoted rookie Jordan Clarkson to start over Price and chose not to play a healthy Lin in a blowout loss to San Antonio. Lin had previously played in each game of the season, averaging 10.5 points and 4.5 assists in 43 games. It was the first time he was healthy and did not play since February 2, 2012, two days before he logged then-career highs against New Jersey at the dawn of Linsanity. After Lin scored a season-high 29 on March 22 in a win over Philadelphia, Scott returned him to the starting lineup. On March 24, Lin and teammate Clarkson, who is half Filipino, became the first Asian Americans to start together in the backcourt in NBA history. Lin missed the last five games of the season due to an upper respiratory infection.

=== Charlotte Hornets (2015–2016) ===
On July 9, 2015, Lin signed a two-year, $4.3 million contract with the Charlotte Hornets, who used their bi-annual exception in the deal. He had been open to re-joining New York, but they were not interested, having drafted guard Jerian Grant to pair with veteran José Calderón at point guard. Lin was projected to back up Hornets point guard Kemba Walker, and coach Steve Clifford envisioned that the two pick-and-roll players would sometimes play together.

Lin made his debut for the Hornets in the team's season opener against the Miami Heat on October 28, scoring 17 points off the bench in a 104–94 loss. On December 17, he scored a season-high 35 points in a 109–99 overtime win over the Toronto Raptors. On March 21, 2016, he scored 15 of his 29 points in the fourth quarter, including the go-ahead jumper with 48 seconds remaining, to help Charlotte rally from a 30–7 deficit in the second quarter for a 91–88 comeback victory over San Antonio. Lin's only season with the Hornets came to an end after they were defeated in seven games by the Heat in the first round of the playoffs. He finished seventh in voting for the NBA Sixth Man of the Year Award.

After declining his $2.2 million player option for the 2016–17 season, Lin became an unrestricted free agent on July 1, 2016.

=== Brooklyn Nets (2016–2018) ===
On July 7, 2016, Lin signed a three-year, $36 million contract with the Brooklyn Nets. The Nets were led by head coach Kenny Atkinson, who was an assistant with the Knicks during Linsanity. Lin made his debut for the Nets in their season opener on October 26, 2016, in an away game against the Boston Celtics. In 27 minutes as a starter, he scored 18 points in a 122–117 loss. Two days later, he recorded a near triple-double with 21 points, nine rebounds, and nine assists in a 103–94 home-opener win over the Indiana Pacers. On December 12, 2016, he returned to action for Brooklyn for the first time since November 2, when he had suffered a strained left hamstring. He played 20 minutes off the bench and scored 10 points in a 122–118 loss to the Houston Rockets. On February 24, 2017, Lin was back in the starting lineup for the Nets after missing 26 games with his hamstring strain. He played just under 15 minutes and scored seven points with five assists in a 129–109 loss to the Denver Nuggets. On April 6, 2017, he scored a season-high 32 points in a 115–107 loss to the Orlando Magic. He ended the injury-plagued season with a total of only 36 games played, averaging 14.5 points and 5.1 assists per game.

On October 18, 2017, during the Nets' season opener against the Indiana Pacers, Lin was injured when he landed awkwardly following a layup. He suffered a ruptured patellar tendon in his right knee and missed the remainder of the season.

=== Atlanta Hawks (2018–2019) ===
On July 13, 2018, Lin was traded to the Atlanta Hawks, along with draft picks, in exchange for the draft rights to Isaia Cordinier and a future second-round pick. The Hawks acquired him to be a mentor for rookie point guard Trae Young, who was the No. 5 overall pick in the draft. On February 11, 2019, the Hawks waived Lin after finalizing a buyout.

=== Toronto Raptors (2019) ===
After clearing waivers, Lin signed with the Toronto Raptors on February 13, 2019, joining a playoff contender. The Raptors were expecting backup point guard Fred VanVleet to be out with an injury for three weeks and had recently traded guard Delon Wright. Lin struggled to crack the Raptors' point guard rotation, finishing the regular season averaging 7 points and 2.2 assists in 23 games. During the playoffs, he was limited to playing in garbage time as the Raptors relied on Kyle Lowry and VanVleet. In June, Lin acknowledged that his 2017 patellar tendon injury continued to limit his athleticism and affect his ability to drive to the basket. Toronto advanced to the NBA Finals, winning the series in six games over Lin's former team, Golden State. In the first NBA Finals held outside the United States, Lin became the first Asian American to win an NBA title. (Note: The first players of Asian descent to win an NBA championship were Chinese Mengke Bateer with San Antonio in 2003 and Sun Yue with the Lakers in 2009.) He played a total of 27 minutes in the playoffs, becoming the first East Asian American as well as the first Harvard graduate to play in an NBA Finals. (Note: The first Asian American was his former Lakers teammate Jordan Clarkson, a Filipino American, who played a year earlier in 2018 with Cleveland.)

Lin became a free agent on July 1. Later that month, in a motivational speech on Taiwanese Christian media outlet GOOD TV, he lamented the fact that he remained unsigned. Lin likened his situation to hitting "rock bottom", adding that he felt as if the NBA had "kind of given up" on him. Teams were uncertain about whether Lin remained mobile enough to play the point guard position.

=== Beijing Ducks (2019–2020) ===
On August 27, 2019, Lin signed with the Beijing Ducks of the CBA for a reported $3 million per year. He also had offers to play in Russia, Israel, and the EuroLeague. The Ducks scheduled for Lin to sit out the month of January in an arrangement agreed upon before the season with their other overseas players, Ekpe Udoh and Justin Hamilton. In his regular season debut on November 3, Lin led the Ducks to a 103–81 win over the Tianjin Gold Lions with 25 points, nine assists, and six rebounds. He was named a starter for the North in the CBA All-Star Game after receiving the most votes on his squad and the second most overall behind the South's Yi Jianlian. Lin scored a game-high 41 points in the contest, which the South won 167–166. On February 1, 2020, the CBA postponed the season due to the COVID-19 pandemic, and the season did not resume until late June. Lin ended the season with averages of 22.3 points, 5.7 rebounds, and 5.6 assists, and he was a finalist for the CBA Defensive Player of the Year award. Beijing was eliminated in the semi-finals of the playoffs to the Guangdong Southern Tigers, who went on to repeat as league champions.

=== Santa Cruz Warriors (2021) ===
During the offseason, Lin sought a return to the NBA. His original team, Golden State, wanted to add him to their G League (formerly D-League) affiliate, the Santa Cruz Warriors. Golden State planned to sign and release him on December 19, 2020, to secure his G League rights for Santa Cruz, but they were unable to obtain a clearance letter from the Ducks, partly because FIBA's offices were closed on the weekends. However, the NBA later passed a new rule, allowing NBA teams to designate one five-year NBA veteran to fill a spot on their G League team. This allowed Golden State to secure Lin without more complicated and costlier roster moves.

On January 9, 2021, Santa Cruz announced that Lin had been added to their team for the 2020–21 season through the new NBA veteran exception rule, which some G League observers dubbed the "Jeremy Lin rule". He played in nine games, averaging 19.8 points and 6.4 assists per game while shooting 50.5 percent from the field and 42.6 percent on 3-pointers.

=== Return to the Ducks (2021–2022) ===
On June 11, 2021, Lin announced that he was returning to the Beijing Ducks in the CBA. After returning to China from San Francisco, he was hospitalized in Shanghai in September after he contracted COVID-19. He lost 20 pounds (9.1 kg) while he was in isolation. He struggled when he returned to play, saying he felt "very tired—like I couldn't breathe".

=== Guangzhou Loong Lions (2022) ===
Lin signed with the Guangzhou Loong Lions for the 2022–23 season. On December 2, 2022, amid protests in China over its COVID-19 controls, the CBA announced that it had fined him 10,000 yuan ($1,400) for "inappropriate remarks about quarantine hotel-related facilities". On December 29, he announced that he had left the team for the season. He played in seven games for Guangzhou, averaging 11.6 minutes, 6.9 points, 2.3 rebounds, and 2.1 assists per game.

=== Kaohsiung 17LIVE Steelers (2023) ===
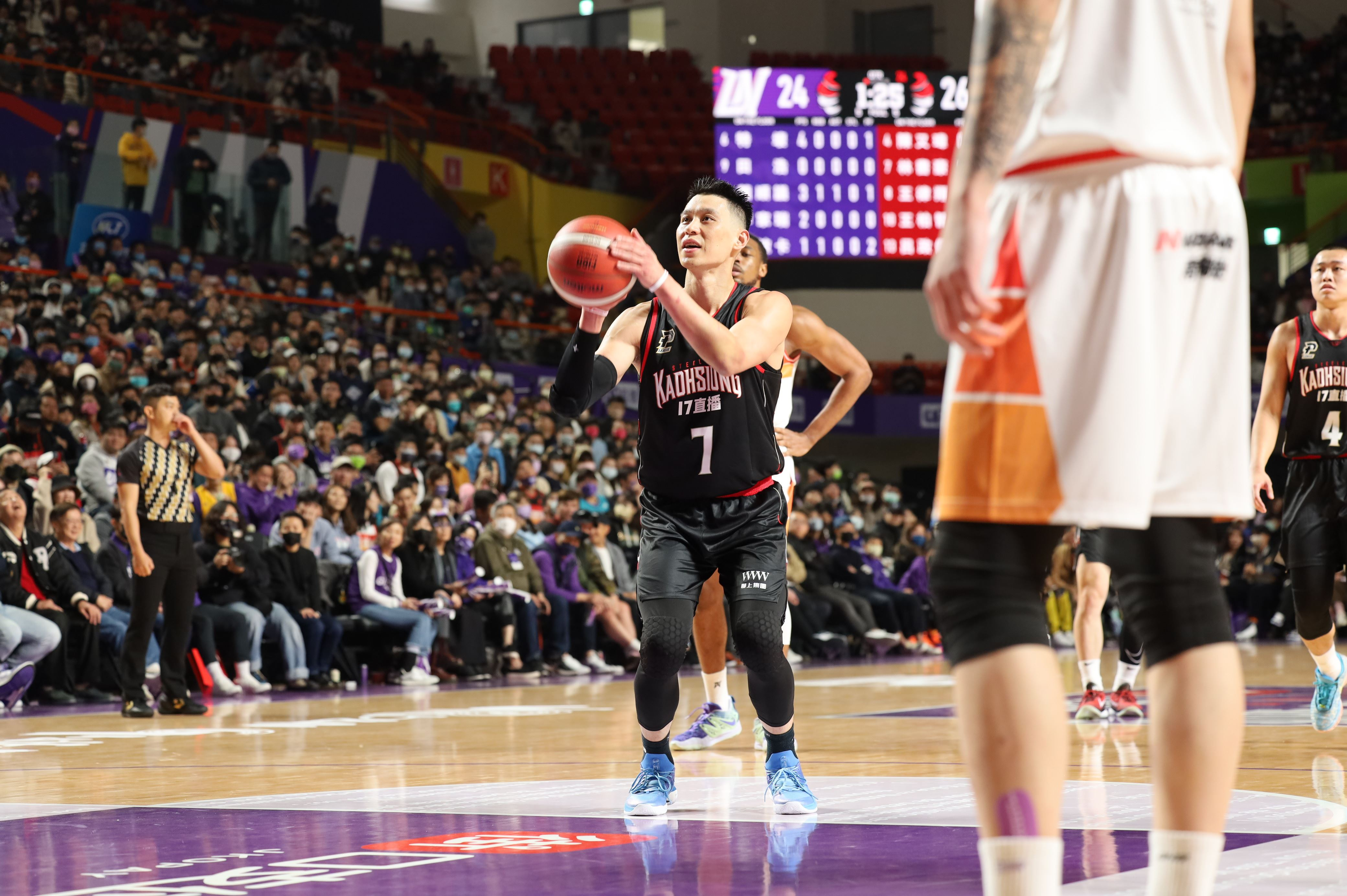
Lin shooting a free throw for the Steelers

On January 26, 2023, Lin signed with the Kaohsiung 17LIVE Steelers of the P. League+ (PLG), in which his brother, Joseph, was playing for the New Taipei Kings.

On April 23, 2023, Lin became the first player in Taiwan's PLG history to record a 50-point triple-double. His final stat line included 50 points, 11 assists, and 10 rebounds.

=== New Taipei Kings (2023–2025) ===
On September 19, 2023, Lin signed with the New Taipei Kings of the PLG, joining his brother Joseph on the team. The team won the league championship in 2024. On September 2, 2024, Lin signed a one-year player option contract extension with the Kings, who joined the Taiwan Professional Basketball League (TPBL). On May 27, 2025, Lin was awarded the Clutch Play of the Year of the TPBL in 2024–25 season. On June 2, Lin was selected to the All-Defensive First Team of the TPBL in 2024–25 season. On June 6, Lin was selected to the All-TPBL First Team in 2024–25 season. On June 14, Lin was awarded the Most Valuable Player of the TPBL in 2024–25 season. On June 29, the Kings won the TPBL championship and Lin was named MVP of the 2025 TPBL finals.

On August 30, 2025, Lin announced his retirement from professional basketball, capping a 15-year career. On November 21, the New Taipei Kings announced to hold Lin's jersey retirement ceremony on December 28.

== National team career ==
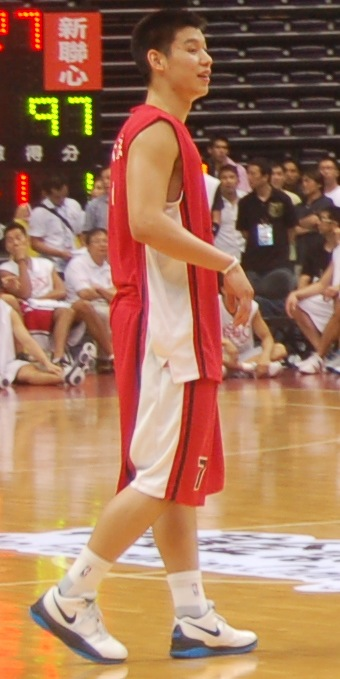
Lin playing in exhibition in Taipei in 2010

In addition to being a U.S. citizen, Lin was by descent through his parents a national of Taiwan; he qualified for a Taiwan passport, though he did not initially obtain one. In June 2011, the Chinese Taipei Basketball Association (CTBA) president Ting Shou-chung considered Lin would be included in the Chinese Taipei (Taiwan) national team's preliminary squad of 24 players for the 2011 FIBA Asia Championship, the preliminary roster of 24 players would be finalized in mid-July. In July 2011, CTBA president Ting Shou-chung said Lin was rehabilitating due to a knee injury and the Golden State Warriors medical team advised Lin not to participate in competitions.

Lin was named to the USA Basketball Men's Select Team to scrimmage against the 2012 U.S. Olympic team candidates, but he did not participate due to his restricted free agent status with the Knicks. In August 2020, he obtained a Taiwan passport.

== Career statistics ==
Legend
GP	Games played	GS	Games started	MPG	Minutes per game
FG%	Field goal percentage	3P%	3-point field goal percentage	FT%	Free throw percentage
RPG	Rebounds per game	APG	Assists per game	SPG	Steals per game
BPG	Blocks per game	PPG	Points per game	**Bold**	Career high
†	Won an NBA championship	*	Led the league

=== NBA ===
==== Regular season ====
Year	Team	GP	GS	MPG	FG%	3P%	FT%	RPG	APG	SPG	BPG	PPG
2010–11	Golden State	29	0	9.8	.389	.200	.760	1.2	1.4	1.1	.3	2.6
2011–12	New York	35	25	26.9	**.446**	.320	.798	3.1	**6.2**	**1.6**	.3	14.6
2012–13	Houston	**82***	**82***	**32.2**	.441	.339	.785	3.0	6.1	**1.6**	.4	13.4
2013–14	Houston	71	33	28.9	**.446**	.358	.823	2.6	4.1	1.0	.4	12.5
2014–15	L.A. Lakers	74	30	25.8	.424	.369	.795	2.6	4.6	1.1	.4	11.2
2015–16	Charlotte	78	13	26.3	.412	.336	.815	3.2	3.0	.7	**.5**	11.7
2016–17	Brooklyn	36	33	24.5	.438	.372	.816	**3.8**	5.1	1.2	.4	14.5
2017–18	Brooklyn	1	1	25.0	.417	**.500**	**1.000**	.0	4.0	.0	.0	**18.0**
2018–19	Atlanta	51	1	19.7	.466	.333	.845	2.3	3.5	.7	.1	10.7
2018–19†	Toronto	23	3	18.8	.374	.200	.810	2.6	2.2	.4	.3	7.0
Career		480	221	25.5	.433	.342	.809	2.8	4.3	1.1	.4	11.6

==== Playoffs ====
Year	Team	GP	GS	MPG	FG%	3P%	FT%	RPG	APG	SPG	BPG	PPG
2013	Houston	4	**3**	21.0	.250	.167	**1.000**	2.0	2.0	.5	**.3**	4.0
2014	Houston	6	0	**29.5**	.410	.217	.813	**3.7**	**4.3**	.5	.2	11.3
2016	Charlotte	7	0	27.0	**.413**	.214	.821	2.3	2.6	**.7**	.0	**12.4**
2019†	Toronto	**8**	0	3.4	.222	**.500**	**1.000**	.4	.5	.1	.0	1.1
Career		25	3	19.1	.376	.216	.836	2.0	2.2	.4	.1	7.2

=== College ===
Year	Team	GP	GS	MPG	FG%	3P%	FT%	RPG	APG	SPG	BPG	PPG
2006–07	Harvard	28	0	18.1	.415	.281	**.818**	2.5	1.8	1.0	0.1	4.8
2007–08	Harvard	**30**	**30**	31.3	.448	.279	.621	4.8	3.6	1.9	0.6	12.6
2008–09	Harvard	28	28	**34.8**	.502	**.400**	.744	**5.5**	4.3	**2.4**	0.6	**17.8**
2009–10	Harvard	29	29	32.2	**.519**	.341	.755	4.4	**4.4**	**2.4**	**1.1**	16.4
Career		115	87	29.2	.481	.333	.733	4.3	3.5	2.0	.6	12.9

=== CBA ===
==== Regular season ====
Year	Team	GP	GS	MPG	FG%	3P%	FT%	RPG	APG	SPG	BPG	PPG
2019–20	Beijing	39	39	32.1	.491	.338	.824	5.7	5.6	1.8	.3	25.0
2021–22	Beijing	23	23	22.5	.423	.392	.803	3.6	4.7	1.3	.2	13.4
2022–23	Guangzhou	7	0	11.6	.396	.273	.583	2.2	2.1	.7	.0	6.9
Career		69	62	26.6	.466	.354	.812	4.6	4.9	1.5	.2	17.7

==== Playoffs ====
Year	Team	GP	GS	MPG	FG%	3P%	FT%	RPG	APG	SPG	BPG	PPG
2019–20	Beijing	4	4	35.3	.516	.316	.792	4.0	5.8	2.5	.0	22.8
2021–22	Beijing	2	2	22.7	.609	.375	.750	4.0	2.0	2.0	.5	17.0
Career		6	6	31.0	.540	.333	.785	4.0	4.5	2.3	.1	20.8

== Player profile ==
Apart from being a capable passer, Lin established himself as a strong, fast-paced offensive player who attacks the basket and excels at the pick-and-roll. He improved his outside shooting during his career and became a threat from three-point range. He has been considered difficult to defend because of his ability to draw fouls. An admitted risk taker, Lin has been criticized for his tendency to commit turnovers and his perceived lack of effectiveness on defense. Following his star turn for the Knicks in 2012, Lin battled inconsistency and injuries.

== Racial issues ==
During his basketball career, Lin encountered racial slurs relating to his Asian ancestry. In the sixth grade, he faced racist comments when he started playing more competitive basketball and journeying outside the Bay Area. While playing for Harvard, he regularly heard bigoted jeers such as "Wonton soup", "Sweet and sour pork", "Open your eyes!", "Go back to China", "Orchestra is on the other side of campus", or pseudo-Chinese gibberish. According to Harvard teammate Oliver McNally, a fellow Ivy League player once called Lin the ethnic slur "chink".

On February 10, 2012, in the middle of a Knicks-Lakers game in which Lin scored 38 points, Fox Sports columnist Jason Whitlock posted the following on Twitter regarding Lin's sexual prowess: "Some lucky lady in NYC is gonna feel a couple inches of pain tonight". Hyphen wrote that Whitlock had "reinforced the insipid and insidious 'small Asian penis' stereotype". The Asian American Journalists Association demanded an apology. "I debased a feel-good sports moment. For that, I'm truly sorry," apologized Whitlock.

Also in February 2012, boxer Floyd Mayweather Jr. wrote on his Twitter page, "Jeremy Lin is a good player but all the hype is because he's Asian. Black players do what he does every night and don't get the same praise." In response to Mayweather, NBC New York noted that "no one of any skin color in the history of basketball has done in their first four starts what Lin pulled off for the Knicks last week."

On February 17, 2012, ESPN used a racial slur in relation to Lin. After Lin had nine turnovers in a loss to the Hornets, ESPN posted a headline that read, "Chink in the Armor". The headline was removed 35 minutes later, and ESPN apologized. The ESPN editor who wrote the headline said it had no racial meaning, but was fired. Lin later reached out to the editor and met with him for lunch, and Lin told him he did not think the headline was meant to be racially charged. Knicks radio announcer Spero Dedes also used the phrase on 1050 ESPN New York.

On November 14, 2013, ESPN SportsCenter anchor Jorge Andres apologized on-air after commenting that Lin "was cooking with some hot peanut oil" after Lin's 21-point performance helped Houston to a win over the Knicks.

I know a lot of people say I'm 'deceptively athletic' and 'deceptively quick', and I'm not sure what's deceptive. But it could be the fact that I'm Asian-American. But I think that's fine. It's something that I embrace, and it gives me a chip on my shoulder. But I'm very proud to be Asian-American and I love it.

— Jeremy Lin, during 2012 All-Star Weekend interview

There has been speculation that Lin's career was adversely affected by stereotypes about the athletic prowess of Asian-Americans. In 2009, Sean Gregory of Time wrote the following in regard to Lin not having received Division I basketball scholarship offers: "[Lin] was scrawny, but don't doubt that a little racial profiling, intentional or otherwise, contributed to his underrecruitment." In 2008, Lin said: "I'm not saying top-5 state automatically gets you offers, but I do think [my ethnicity] did affect the way coaches recruited me. I think if I were a different race, I would've been treated differently." During Lin's college career, fewer than 0.5% of men's Division 1 basketball players were Asian-American. Peter Diepenbrock, Lin's high school basketball coach, stated in 2012 that he did not think Lin's race affected his recruiting until later seeing 10 Division I coaches express interest in a black student who Diepenbrock assessed as "a nice junior college player". Based on comments that his talents were "deceptive", Lin stated in a 2013 60 Minutes interview that he had a "gut feeling" that his ethnicity contributed to his being undrafted. NBA commissioner David Stern also believed discrimination was part of the reason Lin was not drafted. "I don't know whether he was discriminated against because he was at Harvard. Or because he was Asian," said Stern in 2013. Some fans and commentators wrote off his Warriors signing as a publicity stunt. Larry Riley, the team's general manager, denied catering to the Bay Area's large Asian population. He understood that some people would see it that way. "We evaluated him throughout summer league," Riley said. "All that had to happen was for him to confirm what we already believed." While the team created a campaign around him, Riley said it would not have been advisable if Lin was not a basketball player first. Former player and coach Rex Walters, a fellow Asian American, added, "People who don't think stereotypes exist are crazy. If [Lin's] white, he's either a good shooter or heady. If he's Asian, he's good at math. We're not taking him."

Lin's experience in the NBA draft was used as an example in the nonfiction psychology book The Undoing Project by Michael Lewis, which details how stereotypes can overwhelmingly influence a person's decision making, even in the face of contradictory evidence. In the book, Houston Rockets general manager Daryl Morey stated that Lin did very well in pre-draft testing. "He lit up our [statistical] model," said Morey. "Our model said take him with, like, the 15th pick in the draft." A year after the Rockets failed to draft Lin, they began to measure the speed of a player's first two steps; Lin had the quickest first move of any player measured, and he was able to change direction far more quickly than most NBA players. "He's incredibly athletic," said Morey. "But the reality is that every fucking person, including me, thought he was unathletic. And I can't think of any reason for it other than he was Asian."

The first time Lin went to a Pro-Am game in Kezar Pavilion in San Francisco, a security guard told him: "Sorry, sir, there's no volleyball here tonight. It's basketball." Early in his stint with the Knicks, a security guard at Madison Square Garden stopped Lin from entering the players' entrance, mistaking him for a trainer. After signing with the Hornets, the five-year NBA veteran had to convince security at Charlotte's Time Warner Cable Arena that he was a player.

In a 2015 interview with Pablo Torre in ESPN The Magazine, Lin expressed the belief that perceptions of Asians had affected his reputation as a player who was turnover-prone or unable to use both hands, despite statistics that suggested he had improved in both areas. He also noted his reputation as a poor defender who lacked speed, while D'Antoni stated that Lin "was one of the quickest athletes we've ever worked out". Lin also opined that his performance with the Knicks may have gained excessive publicity due to his ethnicity. "People just aren't used to seeing Asians do certain things, so it creates a very polarizing effect," Lin stated. In 2015, Lin said, "I feel like Asians in general don't get the respect that we may deserve whether it comes to sports, basketball, or whatever it might be". Reflecting on the subject of race after he returned to the New York City area in 2016 to play for the Brooklyn Nets, Lin stated, "In some ways, Linsanity wouldn't have been Linsanity if I was a different skin color, most likely, it wouldn't have been as big of a deal, and that went to my advantage, too, but if you look prior to that, a lot of the obstacles to even get to that point where I could get to a position of getting on the floor, those were definitely obstacles that were very much stereotypes that I had to fight along the way. So I've always understood that there's good and there's bad and you have to take them together and just be thankful for it all."

J. A. Adande of ESPN.com wrote that heightened ethnic sensitivity toward Asian Americans was "another way [Lin's] impact resonates far beyond Madison Square Garden". The AAJA released a set of guidelines to the media in response to what it termed as "factual inaccuracies about Lin's background as well as an alarming number of references that rely on stereotypes about Asians or Asian Americans".

In February 2021, Lin was called "coronavirus" by a fellow G League player, which prompted Lin to speak out against the prevailing Asian hate sentiment following the COVID-19 pandemic. Lin spoke out on social media and to various reporters, emphasizing the importance of continued self-education.

== Public image and impact ==
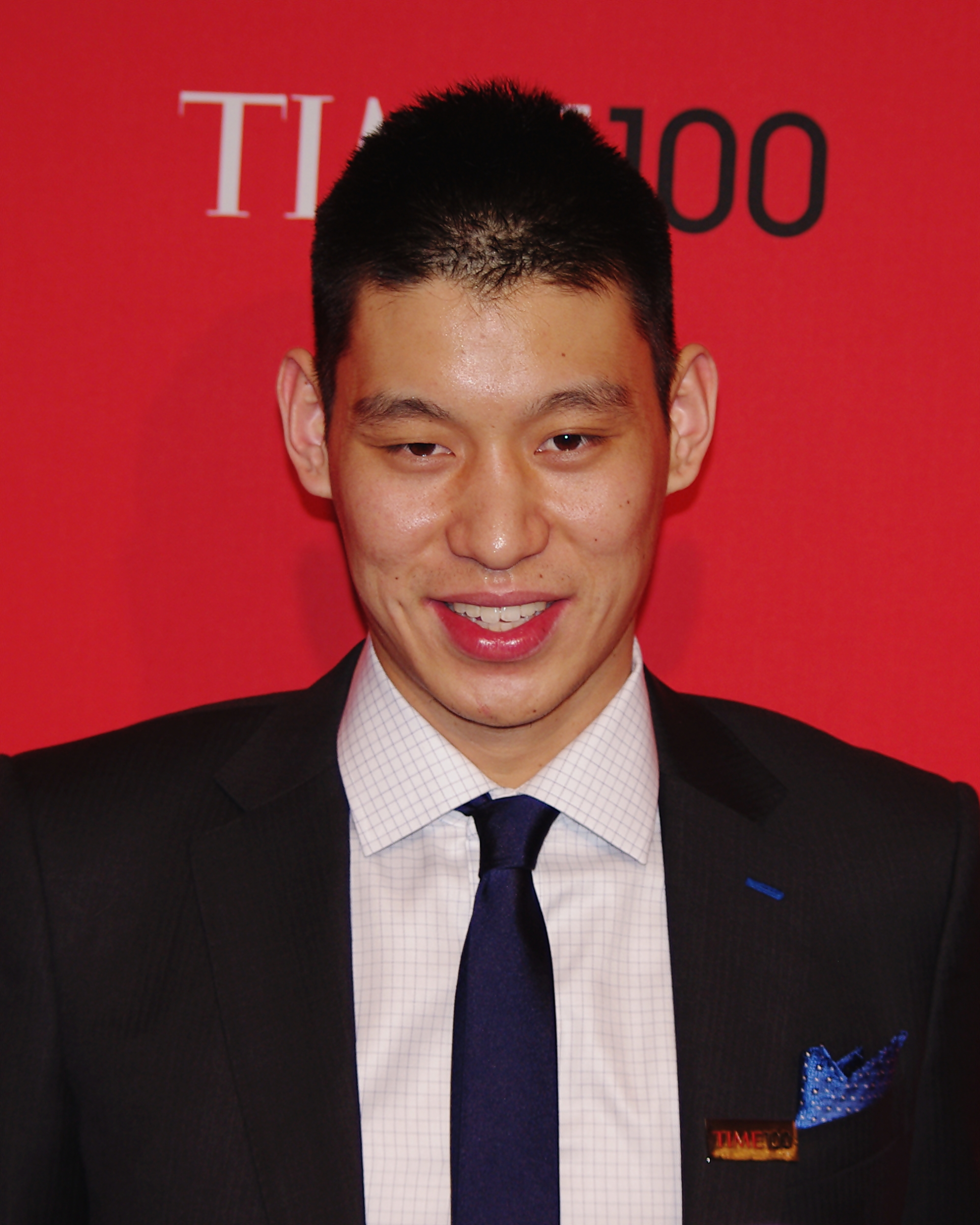
Lin was named to the Time 100 in 2012.

Lin has a popular YouTube account, and has made videos with YouTube personalities Nigahiga and KevJumba. Lin and former Knicks teammate Landry Fields appeared on the channel revealing their "secret handshake". In 2014, Lin became a content partner with Whistle Sports Network, adding his YouTube channel with roughly 400,000 subscribers in exchange for an undisclosed equity stake. He was the first athlete from one of the four major sports leagues in the United States to produce content for the digital sports platform.

In July 2011, the overseas Chinese Vivid Magazine named Lin one of its top eight influential Chinese-Americans. In April 2012, Lin was named to the Time 100 as one of the most influential people in the world. On June 18, 2012, NBA TV announced that Lin was the first-ever winner of the "Social Breakout Player of the Year" Award. He was also the winner of "The EPIC Award". In July 2012, Lin won the ESPY Award for Breakthrough Athlete of the Year. The New York Times wrote: "Jeremy Lin has given Asian-Americans a popular sports figure to relate to". Bleacher Report called Lin an "American icon", explained: "To the rest of the world, Jeremy Lin may be that Asian basketball player from Harvard who was really famous for two weeks or an average NBA point guard who has bounced around from team to team. But for Asian-Americans, Jeremy Lin is our Brad Pitt, our second-most famous person in the world".

In 2014, Madame Tussauds unveiled a wax figure of his likeness at its San Francisco branch. In 2016, Lin starred in an episode of the Comedy Central series Viralocity, playing a heightened version of himself. On May 26, 2021, Jeremy Lin addressed the graduating class of Harvard College as their Class Day speaker.

=== "Linsanity" ===
External images
- Lin on February 20, 2012 cover of Sports Illustrated
- Lin on February 27, 2012 cover of Sports Illustrated
- Lin on February 27, 2012 cover of Time

After he became a starter for the Knicks, the Associated Press called Lin "the most surprising story in the NBA". Bloomberg News wrote that Lin "has already become the most famous [Asian American NBA player]". Knicks fans developed nicknames for him along with a new lexicon inspired by his name, Lin. Most popular was the word Linsanity, the excitement over the unheralded Lin. Time.com ran an article titled, "It's Official: Linsanity Is for Real". Other puns included "Words with Lin", "Linderella", "Lincredible", and "Super Lintendo".

Hall of Fame player Magic Johnson said, "The excitement [Lin] has caused in [Madison Square] Garden, man, I hadn't seen that in a long time". The Associated Press compared Linsanity to Tebowing. Lin appeared on the cover of Sports Illustrated with the headline "Against All Odds", which the Times called "the greatest tribute". He also made the cover of Time in Asia; Forbes wrote, "Congratulations Jeremy. You have now made the cover of Time the same number of times as Michael Jordan. Linsanity reigns on". Lin's story was also on the front-page of many Taipei newspapers. "I haven't done a computation, but it's fair to say that no player has created the interest and the frenzy in this short period of time, in any sport, that I'm aware of like Jeremy Lin has," said NBA commissioner David Stern.

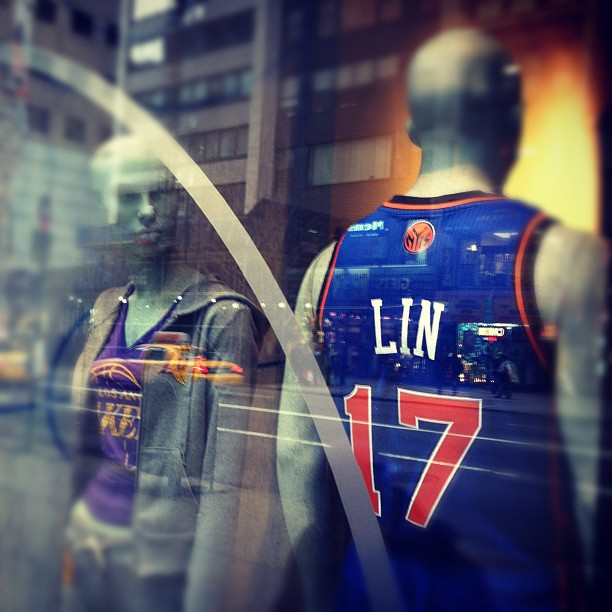
Lin's jersey on display

The Knicks' success due to Lin's play reportedly contributed to the end of a dispute that had for 48 days prevented Time Warner Cable customers from watching Knicks games and other MSG Network programs. The market capitalization of the Madison Square Garden Company, the team's owner, rose by $250 million in February and $600 million by July 2012. The Knicks quickly began selling replicas of Lin's No. 17 jerseys and T-shirts, and the sales and traffic for its online store increased more than 3,000%. Lin's jersey became the best-selling online in the league in the week of February 4, 2012, and the Knicks the best-selling team; the team began selling Lin merchandise on February 10, and one souvenir stand at Madison Square Garden sold out before the game started. His merchandise dominated the displays at Knicks stores, while those for the team's high-priced stars—Anthony, Stoudemire, and Chandler—were moved to the sale racks. He had the best selling jersey in the NBA in February and March. For the one-year period ending April 2012, Lin had the second highest selling jersey in the league behind Derrick Rose. Both Nike and Adidas introduced Lin-related athletic apparel, and expected that his fame would help sales in China. His popularity was attributed with growing the NBA's popularity there since Yao Ming's retirement in the offseason; the audience for NBA games on television and online in China rose 39 percent over the previous season.

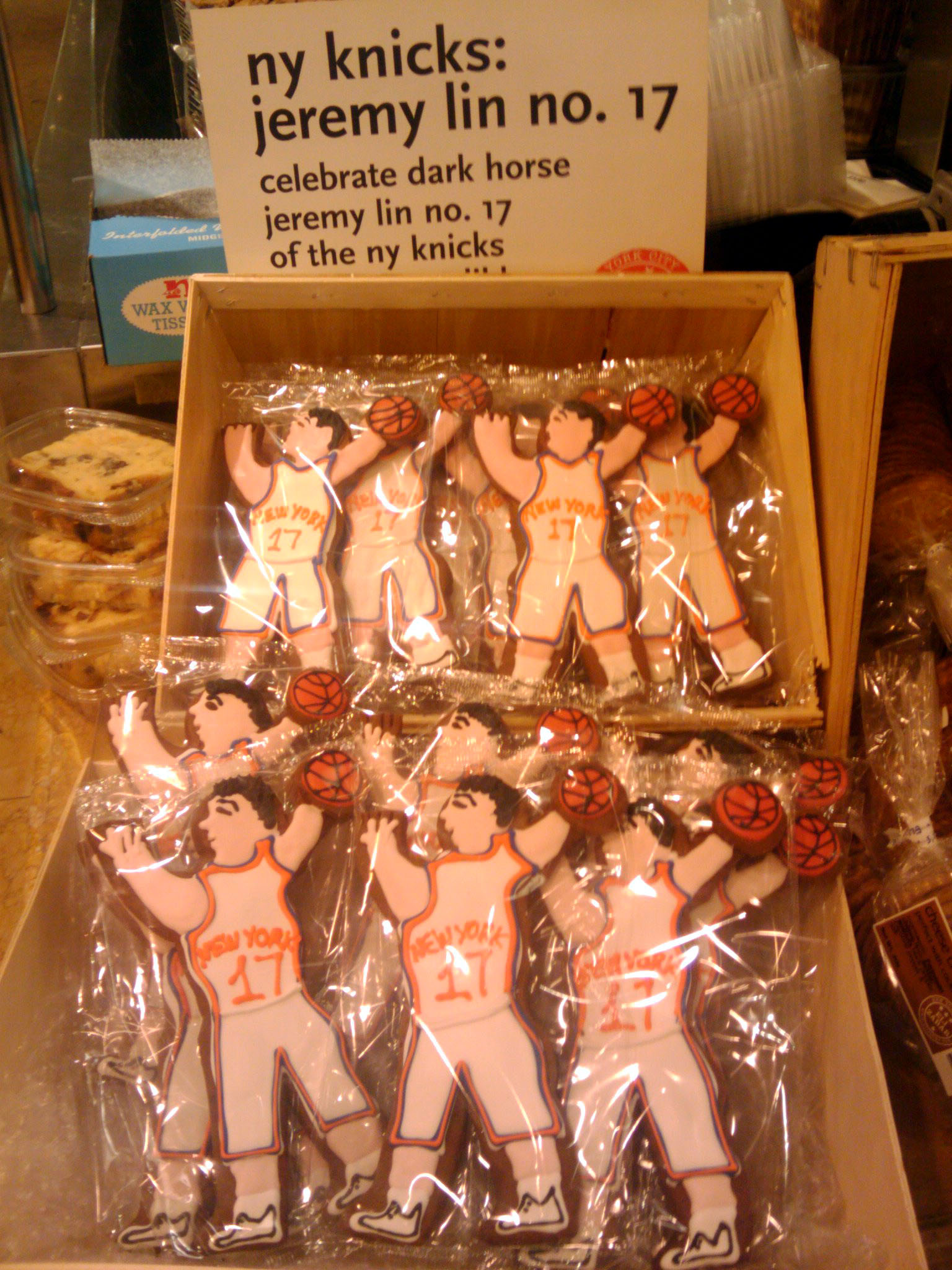
Cookies inspired by Lin were available in New York in March 2012

Within three weeks of his first game as a starter, at least seven e-books were being published on Lin. He appeared on a second consecutive Sports Illustrated cover, the first New York-based team athlete and the third NBA player in the magazine's history to do so. New York City restaurants introduced new food and bar items in honor of Lin, and sales of Yanjing Beer rose. The city has about 450,000 residents of Chinese or Taiwanese descent—larger than the entire populations of NBA cities like Miami, Atlanta or Cleveland—and viewing parties to watch Lin play flourished in Manhattan's Chinatown. An airline advertised "Linsanely low prices", bids for his rookie card exceeded $21,000 on eBay, and the press circulated rumors—denied by Lin—that he was dating Kim Kardashian. Foreign Policy speculated on his potential impact on Sino-American relations, and Jack and Suzy Welch wrote that Lin's rise was a lesson to business leaders to not let bureaucracy stifle unproven talent. Despite Lin's sudden fame, Sacramento Kings coach Keith Smart stated, "I knew [Lin] before he was Linmania. He's still the same humble guy. The guy has not changed a bit, which is real special for a young man."

Lin trademarked the word Linsanity in 2012 to preempt strangers from profiting from his likeness. Two others had attempted to trademark the term in the first week of February, but the United States Patent and Trademark Office ultimately registered the term to Lin. A documentary film about Lin, titled Linsanity, premiered on January 20, 2013, at the Sundance Film Festival. It was shown at numerous film festivals before making its way into art houses.

Ben & Jerry's created a frozen yogurt in honor of Lin named "Taste the Lin-Sanity". It contained lychee honey swirls and fortune cookie pieces. The company later replaced the fortune cookies with waffle cookies and apologized to anyone offended by their Lin-Sanity flavor.

In May 2020, during the COVID-19 pandemic in the United States, the Knicks re-broadcast a week of Linsanity games on the MSG Network. Lin stated: "When I first got the call from my agent like, 'Hey, [the Knicks] want to do this,' I was floored. Because with COVID, right now, New York is going through one of the toughest times that it has seen in decades. It is a very, very tragic time. And the Knicks were like, 'Hey, we need to do something to uplift everybody.'"

=== Endorsements ===
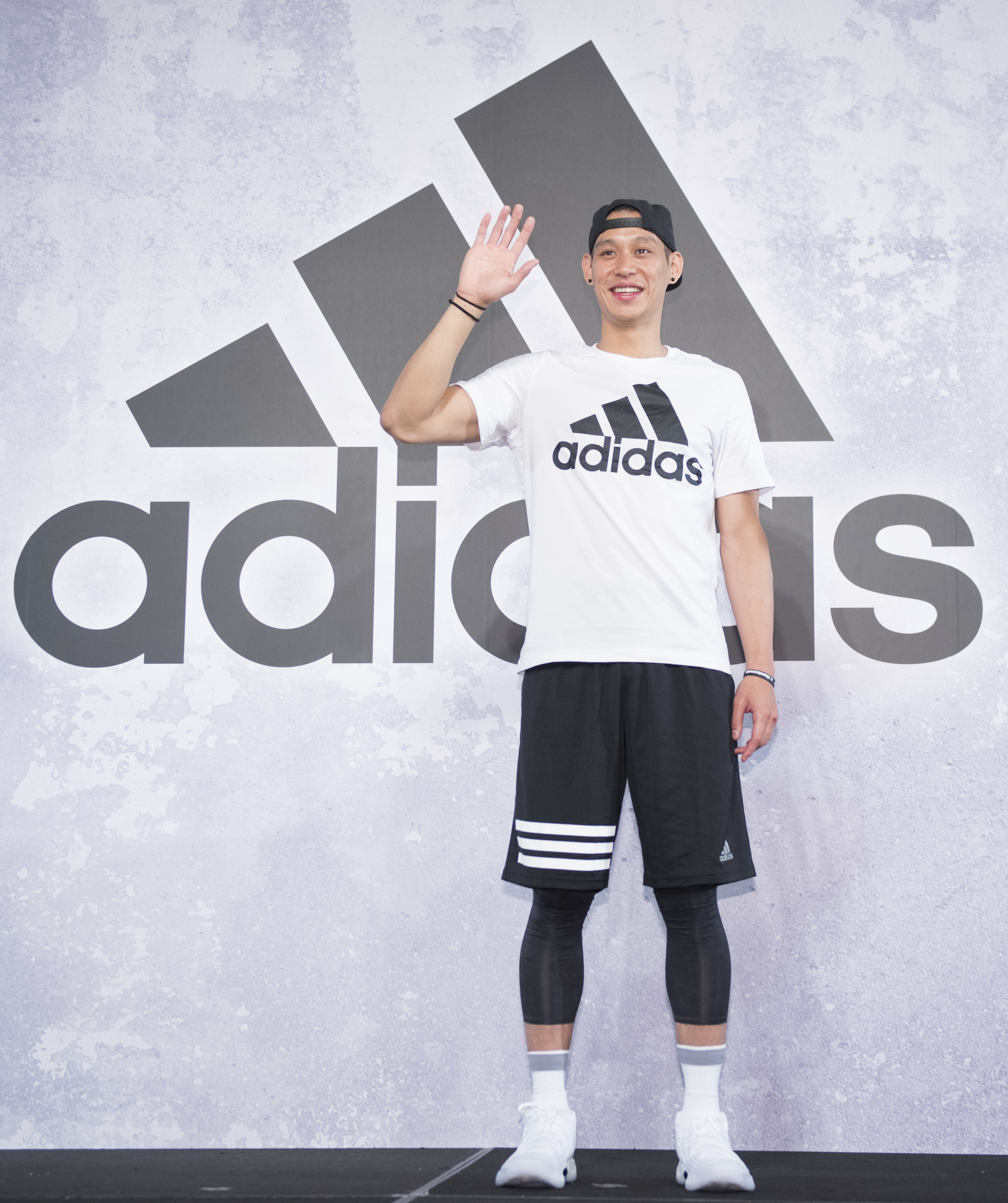
Lin in 2017

Lin has turned down most of the sponsorship deals he has been offered. He stated that he declined tens of millions of dollars of endorsement opportunities during the peak of Linsanity. "I do think my purpose is to play basketball, play well, and play for the glory of God," he said. Lin called business outside basketball "definitely secondary to my primary job".

He has endorsed the following brands during his career:

- Volvo
- Nike (2010–2014)
- Steiner Sports
- Adidas (2014–2019)
- Xtep (2019–2022)

In November 2020, in partnership with Xtep, Lin released a signature shoe called Xtep JLin One, which was available in Asia.

=== Music ===
Lin has collaborated with fellow Asian-American rapper MC Jin on the single "The First Opponent". The music video was released on YouTube on May 28, 2019.

== Philanthropy ==
In October 2016, Lin donated $1 million to Harvard University to support undergraduate financial aid and renovations to Lavietes Pavilion.

In February 2020, Lin donated ¥1 million (about $144,370) to help those affected by the COVID-19 pandemic. He also spoke out against the racism related to the outbreak, stating: "I've lived in China this past season and now being back on US soil, I'm saddened by the racist comments regarding the virus in China. There are real people suffering and real heroes working around the clock in service to others — please don't let your fear or ignorance rob you of seeing that. This world needs more compassion and empathy."

In April 2020, Lin donated $500,000 to the nonprofits Direct Relief and Feeding America to help those affected by the COVID-19 pandemic; he also wrote an article for The Players' Tribune in which he pledged to match donations up to an additional $500,000 and encouraged unity, writing: "Again, at a time like this that requires everyone uniting to survive, COVID-19 shouldn't be about East vs. West, politics, race or anything other than helping as many people as we can survive."

In an NBA Together Virtual Roundtable held in May 2020, Lin further spoke out against anti-Asian racism, stating: "All it would take is 10 seconds to put yourself in the position of someone who is dealing with racism or somebody who is legitimately contemplating whether to go to the grocery store to get food for themselves or to not because they're afraid of being attacked. ... Sometimes the best thing you can do is to not post the hateful comment, or don't be a troll, or take a second to think about what you're saying or doing or if you know someone acting ignorant call them out. All these things are small steps in the right direction."

== Personal life ==
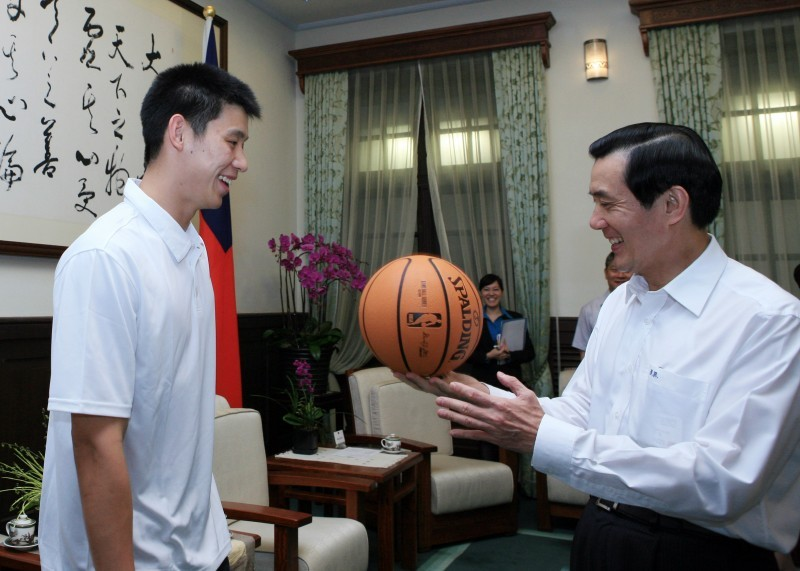
Lin meets Taiwanese president Ma Ying-jeou, 2010

Mostly private about his personal life, Lin announced on social media in January 2023 that he and his wife got married about two years before. She is of Filipino descent. His older brother, Joshua, studied dentistry at New York University.

Lin is an evangelical Protestant, and was a leader in Harvard's Asian American Christian Fellowship during his time there. He credited his NBA success to playing without pressure. "I've surrendered that to God. I'm not in a battle with what everybody else thinks anymore," said Lin. He hopes to become a pastor who can head up non-profit organizations, either home or abroad, and has talked of working in inner-city communities to help with underprivileged children.

Lin said that he understands Mandarin, though he could use some help speaking it; he can also read and write a little. He took a few Mandarin classes while attending Harvard to try to improve. After joining the Knicks in 2012, Lin slept on a couch in his brother's one-bedroom apartment on the Lower East Side of Manhattan, New York City. He moved to a luxury condo in White Plains, New York, after his Knicks contract became guaranteed.

Lin is a fan of the video game Dota 2, having played the first game in the series, Defense of the Ancients, since his second year of high school. He appeared in Free to Play, the 2014 documentary centered around the game, in which he described Dota 2 as a "way of life" that helped him better connect with his family and friends. In 2016, Lin formed his own professional Dota 2 team, known as J.Storm.

On August 23, 2024, Lin announced that his son had been born "a few months" earlier.

== Discography ==
=== Singles ===
Title	Year	Peak chart position	Album
Title	Year	CHN V Chart	Album
Collaborations
"The First Opponent" (with MC Jin)	2019	13	Non-album single
"—" denotes releases that did not chart or were not released in that region.
