= Magnum P.I. (2018 TV series) season 1 =

Season of television series

Magnum P.I.
- Season 1
- American DVD cover
- Showrunners: Peter M. Lenkov; Eric Guggenheim
- Starring: Jay Hernandez; Perdita Weeks; Zachary Knighton; Stephen Hill; Amy Hill; Tim Kang
- No. of episodes: 20

Release
- Original network: CBS
- Original release: September 24, 2018 – April 1, 2019

Season chronology
- Next → Season 2

The first season of the crime and action drama Magnum P.I. premiered on September 24, 2018, on CBS, for the 2018–19 United States network television schedule. The series is a remake of the 1980 series of the same name and centers on Thomas Magnum, a former Navy SEAL who works as a private investigator and solves mysteries with the help of his friends. The season stars Jay Hernandez, Perdita Weeks, Zachary Knighton, and Stephen Hill. Amy Hill and Tim Kang also appear in the series and joined in the series third episode. CBS first announced the series on October 20, 2017; it was initially given a thirteen episode order but an additional seven were ordered bringing the total to twenty. Multiple Hawaii Five-0 stars appeared as their Hawaii Five-0 characters in guest roles throughout the season in minor crossover events.

The season was viewed by an average of 8.36 million viewers and ranked 37 out of all television series for the season. "I Saw the Sun Rise", the series premiere, brought in 8.12 million viewers while "The Day It All Came Together", the season finale was viewed by 5.54 million. "Winner Takes All", the seasons twelfth episode, aired directly after the American Football Conference championship causing it to be the highest viewed episode of the season at 8.76 million. The season primarily received mixed reviews from both critics and viewers and was nominated for two Imagen Awards, one of which was won. The season concluded on April 1, 2019, and despite the mixed reviews Magnum P.I. was renewed for a second season which premiered on September 27, 2019.

== Cast and characters ==
=== Main ===
- Jay Hernandez as Thomas Magnum, a former Navy SEAL who is a security consultant for the successful novelist Robin Masters, living in the guest house on his estate, while also working as a private investigator
- Perdita Weeks as Juliet Higgins, a former MI6 agent who is majordomo to Robin Masters; she and Magnum bicker but become allies
- Zachary Knighton as Orville "Rick" Wright, a Marine veteran and former door gunner, who is also a playboy
- Stephen Hill as Theodore "T.C." Calvin, a Marine veteran and helicopter pilot who runs helicopter tours of Hawaii and is a member of Magnum's team
- Amy Hill as Teuila "Kumu" Tuileta, the cultural curator of Robin Masters' estate
- Tim Kang as Honolulu Police Department (HPD) Detective Gordon Katsumoto, who dislikes Magnum but usually comes to the team's aid when needed

=== Recurring ===
- Domenick Lombardozzi as Sebastian Nuzo
- Christopher Thornton as Kenny "Shammy" Shamberg

=== Notable guests ===
- Sung Kang as HPD Lieutenant Yoshi Tanaka
- Ken Jeong as Luther Gillis
- Carl Weathers as Dan Sawyer
- Elisabeth Röhm as Brooke Mason
- Cyndi Lauper as Vanessa Nero
- Ben Vereen as Henry Barr
- Corbin Bernsen as Francis "Icepick" Hofstetler
- Jamie-Lynn Sigler as Toni
- Ryan Blaney as Shane Powell
- Eddie George as Travis Leet
- Jordana Brewster as Hannah
- Christian Yelich as himself
- Roger E. Mosley as John Booky
- Brooke Lyons as Abby Miller

=== Crossover ===
- Kimee Balmilero as Dr. Noelani Cunha
- Taylor Wily as Kamekona Tupuola
- Dennis Chun as HPD Sergeant Duke Lukela
- Kala Alexander as Kawika

== Episodes ==
The number in the "No. overall" column refers to the episode's number within the overall series, whereas the number in the "No. in season" column refers to the episode's number within this particular season. Numerous episodes are named after similarly named episodes from the original series. "Production code" refers to the order in which the episodes were produced while "U.S. viewers (millions)" refers to the number of viewers in the U.S. in millions who watched the episode as it was aired.

List of Magnum P.I. season 1 episodes
No. overall	No. in season	Title	Directed by	Written by	Original release date	Prod. code	US viewers (millions)
1	1	"I Saw the Sun Rise"	Justin Lin	Peter M. Lenkov & Eric Guggenheim	September 24, 2018	MPI101	8.12
Former Navy SEAL Thomas Magnum settles into his new life as a private investigator and security consultant, but when his former teammate Nuzo winds up dead, Magnum is pulled into a quest for vengeance and gets dragged into a hunt for Iraqi gold.
2	2	"From the Head Down"	Karen Gaviola	Peter M. Lenkov & Eric Guggenheim	October 1, 2018	MPI102	6.23
An assignment to track down and retrieve a 300-pound bluefin tuna for a friend of Nuzo takes a turn for the worse when the robber is blackmailed by an armed group to give them the fish. Magnum and his friends act as intermediaries only to discover they were only interested in a small part of the fish. They deduce a memory card was implanted on the tuna in a complicated plot to pass classified information and Magnum decides to act instead of waiting for the FBI.
3	3	"The Woman Who Never Died"	Sylvain White	Joe Gazzam	October 8, 2018	MPI103	6.08
Friendly rival Luther Gillis (Ken Jeong) throws a case of a comatose woman with facial reconstruction surgery in Magnum's lap, but what should have been a simple background check gets more complicated when Higgins discovers the woman is using a stolen ID and Magnum discovers her possible relation to a robbery-murder case. The woman's boyfriend decides he doesn't want to know more and pays Magnum, but he continues to investigate as he refuses to believe a woman who went to such lengths to keep close to her daughter might be a murderer.
4	4	"Six Paintings, One Frame"	Antonio Negret	Ashley Gable	October 15, 2018	MPI104	5.48
Magnum is hired by millionaire businessman Jack Candler to check the security of his art collection. That night, Candler is killed by art robbers that used the same access route Magnum did, which means it was someone who had access to his security report. Magnum's main suspect ends up dead. Katsumoto gets a search order for Robins's Nest and arrests Magnum as the prime suspect in the case after getting an anonymous tip, but lets him go. Higgins discovers the main suspect was in contact with an art forger, but he has also been killed. A rare pigment found in the study leads Magnum to the art appraiser and one of Candler's collaborators, allowing him to resolve the case.
5	5	"Sudden Death"	David Grossman	David Fury	October 22, 2018	MPI106	5.63
When Makoa, one of TC's junior league Football players misses several training sessions, TC asks Magnum for help. The boy's father, Hani, has been arrested for killing a medical doctor but, though he claims innocence, is not telling them the full truth. Magnum leaves the boy in Higgins' care while he investigates, but the evidence against Hani is mounting. It's only after Magnum gets Hani to tell him he was using the steroids the doctor was trafficking with that he's able to discover the true killer.
6	6	"Death is Only Temporary"	Duane Clark	Gene Hong & Scarlett Lacey	October 29, 2018	MPI105	5.69
A case of an old man's lost love returning from out of the blue takes on a few unexpected twists when Magnum investigates. Meanwhile, Rick and TC reach out to a disabled and depressed fellow veteran (Christopher Thornton) to try and help him back on his feet.
7	7	"The Cat Who Cried Wolf"	Eagle Egilsson	Neil Tolkin	November 5, 2018	MPI107	5.27
Magnum takes the case of a little girl's lost cat and winds up in an incident involving witness protection and a dirty cop...and acquires his signature aloha shirt in the process.
8	8	"Die He Said"	Peter Weller	Joe Gazzam	November 12, 2018	MPI108	5.50
Magnum is hired by a terminal patient to find his estranged brother for a bone marrow transplant and has to beat a gang of meth dealers to get to him, and fighting flashbacks to Afghanistan about a similar extraction that didn't go so well.
9	9	"The Ties That Bind"	Ron Underwood	Ashley Gable	November 19, 2018	MPI109	5.39
After a traumatized teenager escapes from being kidnapped, her parents hire Magnum to track down the kidnappers, though the teen won't open up until she's in Higgins' care. Something more sinister lies behind it all...
10	10	"Bad Day to be a Hero"	Lin Oeding	Ashley Charbonnet	December 10, 2018	MPI110	5.47
A high-stakes poker game gets hit by masked gunmen and Rick needs Magnum's help to bail out a friend in debt to a major crime boss, but they stumble upon a slave trade ring in the process.
11	11	"Nowhere to Hide"	Mark Tinker	Story by : Peter M. Lenkov; Teleplay by : Joe Gazzam	January 14, 2019	MPI112	6.02
A missing persons case turns sinister when Magnum discovers he's been tricked into doing dirty work for the Russian secret service.
12	12	"Winner Takes All"	Amanda Marsalis	Gene Hong	January 20, 2019	MPI113	8.76
A bail bondsman puts a price on an alleged killer's head and Magnum is now in the running against every other bounty hunter and private investigator on the island in a race against time.
13	13	"Day of the Viper"	Bryan Spicer	Story by : David Fury; Teleplay by : Gene Hong & Eric Guggenheim	January 21, 2019	MPI111	5.33
When a man with a bullet in his leg stumbles into Robin's Nest, the situation takes a personal turn for Higgins when her old MI6 mentor offers her the chance to track down and capture the killer of the man she loved. Meanwhile, Rick fills in for Magnum on a background check, with disastrous results.
14	14	"I, The Deceased"	Krishna Rao	Scarlett Lacey	January 28, 2019	MPI114	5.69
A fat wad of cash and a video from a distressed young man has Magnum (literally) being hired from beyond the grave to solve his client's murder.
15	15	"Day the Past Came Back"	Bryan Spicer	Peter M. Lenkov & Eric Guggenheim	February 18, 2019	MPI115	5.97
When Magnum is abducted and forced to assist on a search for the stolen Iraqi gold, the situation takes a painfully personal turn when he discovers the person behind the theft is also responsible for his and his team's imprisonment in Afghanistan.
16	16	"Murder is Never Quiet"	David Straiton	Barbie Kligman	February 25, 2019	MPI116	6.29
Magnum is hired by a woman to prove that her son didn't kill his girlfriend and has only 24 hours to do so before the accused accepts a plea deal. Meanwhile, Rick and TC try to recover stolen appliances that were donated to a wounded veteran.
17	17	"Black is the Widow"	Kirstin Windell	Neil Tolkin	March 4, 2019	MPI117	5.61
After a man is murdered, Magnum poses as a doctor on the same dating app the victim was using in order to find the killer who may be preying on wealthy men...and inadvertently finds real love himself. Christian Yelich guest stars.
18	18	"A Kiss Before Dying"	Bryan Spicer	Barbie Kligman & Ashley Charbonnet	March 11, 2019	MPI118	6.05
When the Dobermans dig up what appears to be a human bone, Magnum and Higgins help Katsumoto investigate the murder of his former mentor.
19	19	"Blood in the Water"	Karen Gaviola	Gene Hong	March 25, 2019	MPI119	5.74
When Magnum and Higgins get "yacht-jacked", Higgins is shot and she and Magnum are stranded at sea, struggling to reach land before she bleeds out and the culprits return to finish them off.
20	20	"The Day It All Came Together"	Bryan Spicer	Peter M. Lenkov & Eric Guggenheim	April 1, 2019	MPI120	5.54
Hannah (guest star Jordana Brewster), Magnum's ex-fiancee and the fugitive responsible for him and his SEAL team brothers being POWs for years, shows up at his home with a gunshot wound, wanting his help to find her missing CIA father whose life is in danger. Also, Magnum makes an earnest proposition to Higgins for her to become his private investigations partner.

=== Crossovers ===
On July 19, 2018, it was announced that the season would see multiple crossovers with the ninth season of Hawaii Five-0. Lenkov later confirmed the announcement and Kimee Balmilero as well as Taylor Wily made guest appearances as their Five-0 characters in episodes one and two of Magnum P.I., respectively. Meanwhile, Alex O'Loughlin's character, Steve McGarrett was set to cross paths with Hernandez's Thomas Magnum, later in the season in a crossover event, however a full crossover event did not air until the following television season. Balmilero and Wily continued to make guest appearances throughout the first season. Dennis Chun appeared in the seventeenth episode.

== Production ==
=== Development ===
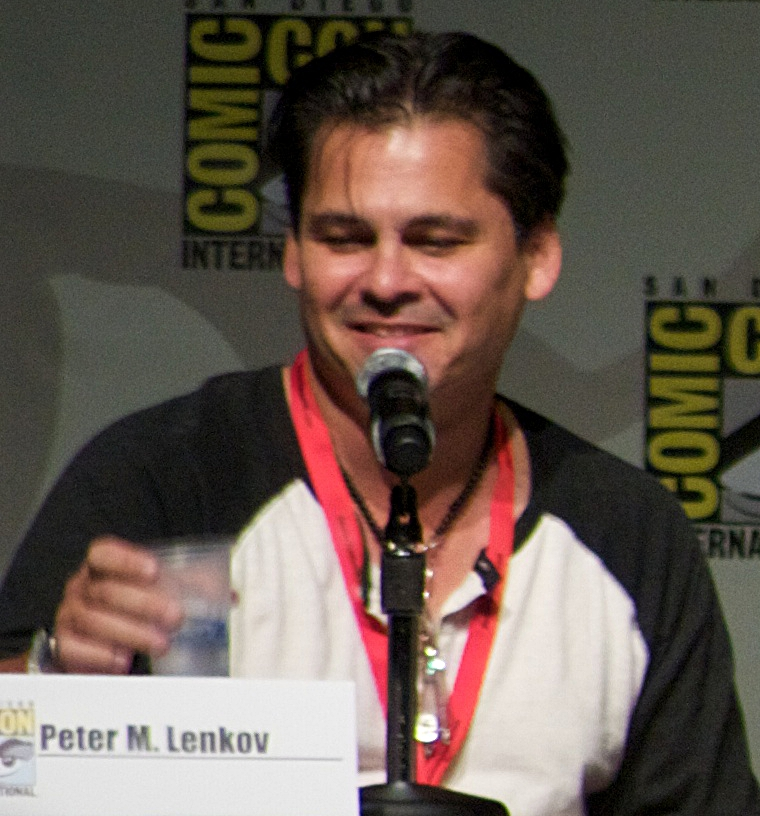
Peter M. Lenkov who previously rebooted Hawaii Five-0 and MacGyver developed the series

On September 22, 2016, it was reported that ABC was developing a sequel to Magnum, P.I. centered around Thomas Magnum's daughter Lily. ABC gave the series a script commitment plus substantial penalty. The project was led by Leverage creator John Rogers with Eva Longoria and her production company, UnbeliEVAble Entertainment. Rogers was also announced to be writing the script; Rogers, Longoria, Ben Spector, and Jennifer Court also signed on as executive producers. Universal Television, who owned the rights to the original series, was reported as the production studio. No further updates on the project were given but nearly a year later on October 20, 2017, it was announced that CBS was developing a reboot of the original series from Peter M. Lenkov who also developed the Five-0 and MacGyver reboots. At the time CBS ordered a pilot production commitment for the series. Lenkov and Eric Guggenheim, Five-0 writer and co-showrunner, were announced as the writers for the pilot. Lenkov, Guggenheim, and The Blacklist producers John Davis and John Fox of Davis Entertainment were reported as executive producers. CBS Television Studios and Universal Television co-produced the series. Danielle Woodrow was also later announced to be serving as an executive producer on the series. The series was initially picked up by CBS for thirteen episodes and an additional seven episodes were later ordered. Magnum P.I. was renewed for a second season which premiered on September 27, 2019.

=== Filming ===
The pilot episode filmed in March and April 2018 at Hawaii Film Studio. The pilot was directed by Justin Lin, who also directed other CBS pilots for Scorpion and the 2018 reboot of S.W.A.T. The rest of the season began filming on July 23, 2018, with a traditional Hawaiian blessing. Primary filming for the series takes place in the state of Hawaii on the island of O'ahu at Kalaeloa Studio where Inhumans previously filmed. The fictional Robin’s Nest Estate where Magnum and Higgins lives is located at Kalaeloa Ranch a location which Jurassic World also used as a filming location. Other filming locations include numerous beaches including Maili, Waikiki, and Kapolei. On Wednesday, August 22, 2018, with the anticipated landfall of Hurricane Lane, a Category 4 hurricane in Hawaii, CBS reported that they "were closely monitoring the situation" but that production would continue as planned. The following day CBS temporarily shut down production of both Five-0 and Magnum P.I. until further notice.

=== Casting ===
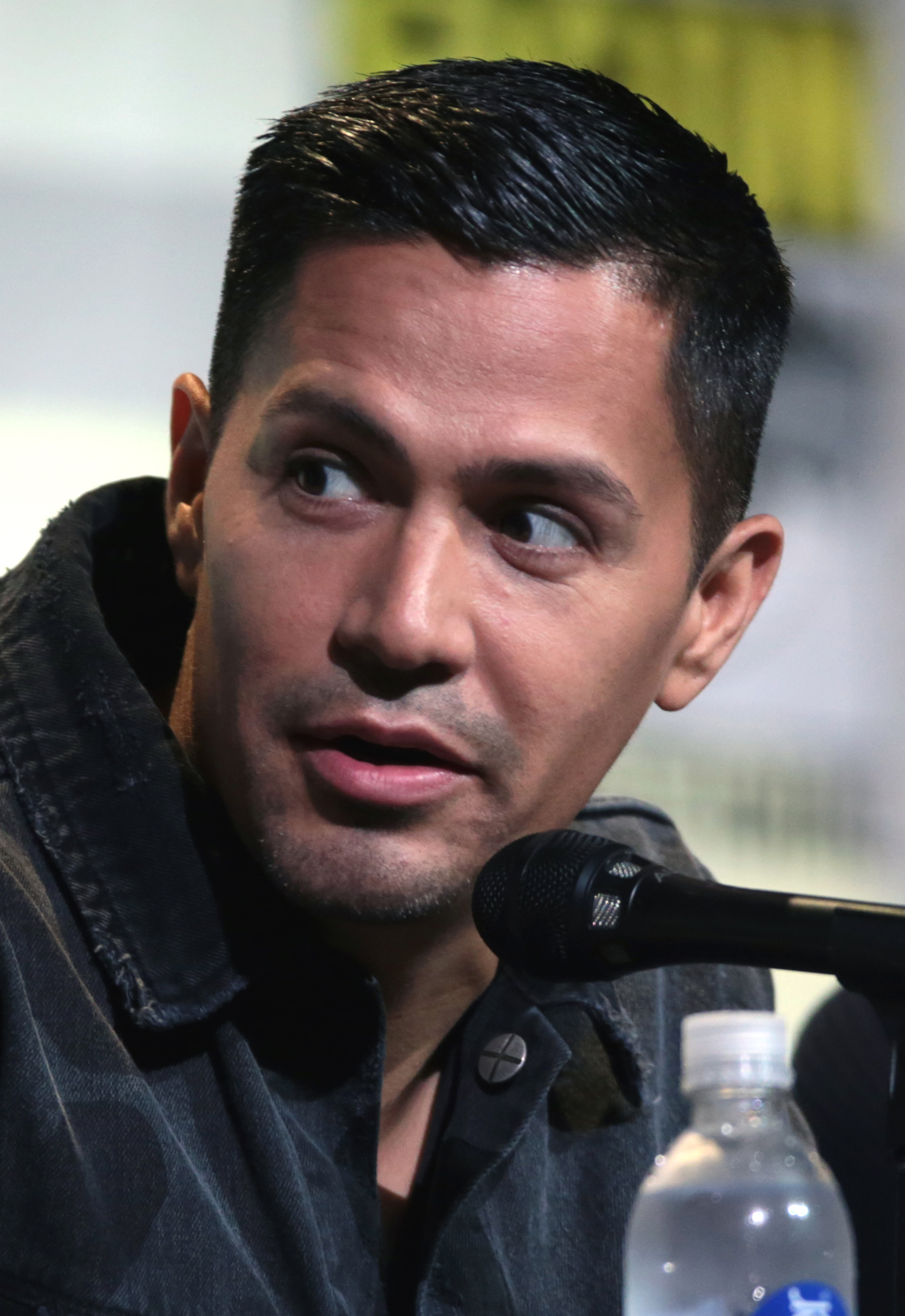
Jay Hernandez was the first to be cast in the series as the title character, Thomas Magnum

When the series was announced it was reported that CBS intended to genderswap the character of Jonathan Higgins and rename the character Juliet Higgins. On February 2, 2018 Deadline Hollywood reported that CBS was looking for a non-white actor to lead the series in an effort to have diverse casts. It was later announced that Jay Hernandez had been cast as the title character Thomas Magnum, who was portrayed by Tom Selleck in the original series. Perdita Weeks was cast as Higgins on March 2, 2018. Zachary Knighton and Stephen Hill were later cast as Orville "Rick" Wright and Theodore "T.C." Calvin, respectively. Tim Kang and Amy Hill were the last two to be cast in the series as Detective Gordon Katsumoto and Kumu, respectively. Amy Hill was originally cast as a recurring character with the option to be upgraded to a series regular; she was upped to a series regular before her first episode aired. Both Amy Hill and Kang debuted in the seasons third episode.

Kimee Balmilero, Taylor Wily, and Dennis Chun all appeared as their Five-0 characters in seven, two, and one episodes, respectively. Chun previously appeared in the original Magnum, P.I. as various minor characters throughout its run. Domenick Lombardozzi, Ken Jeong, and Christopher Thornton were cast in recurring roles and appeared throughout the season. Former NFL and CFL football player, Carl Weathers, MLB baseball player, Christian Yelich, and NASCAR driver Ryan Blaney all appeared as guest stars. Elisabeth Röhm and Corbin Bernsen who previously portrayed characters in Five-0, while Röhm's character was also mentioned in MacGyver, both appeared in the season as different characters. Singer/songwriter Cyndi Lauper also appeared as a guest star in the seasons fifth episode. Roger E. Mosley who starred as Theodore Calvin in the original Magnum, P.I. guest starred in one episode. Selleck stated in an interview that he would never appear in the series even though he was asked as not to take away from the original Magnum, P.I. and due to conflicting filming of Blue Bloods which also airs on CBS.

== Release ==
The pilot episode was screened at San Diego Comic Con on July 19, 2018, followed by a question and answer panel with Lenkov, Guggenheim, Hernandez, Weeks, Knighton, and Stephen Hill. In August 2018, it was announced that the series would have an advanced premiere screening along with an advanced premiere screening of the Five-0 ninth season premiere. The annual event which had previously had only been marketed with Five-0 is known as "Sunset on the Beach", featured interviews with the cast and crew as well as a special performance by Cyndi Lauper, and was scheduled to take place on September 14, 2018, at Waikiki beach in Honolulu, Hawaii. It was later rescheduled to September 16, as a result of the Category 4 Hurricane Olivia. The series premiered on CBS on September 24, 2018, for the 2018–19 United States network television schedule. All episodes aired on Mondays at 9:00 pm ET with the exception of the twelfth episode, "Winner Takes All", which aired on Sunday, January 20, at 10:00 pm ET, immediately following the 2019 American Football Conference championship game. The season later concluded on April 1, 2019, after airing 20 episodes. In the United Kingdom Magnum P.I. began airing on Sky One on January 16, 2019. CTV purchased the rights to air the series in Canada on May 31, 2018, and aired the season in simulcast with CBS.

== Reception ==
=== Critical response ===
The review aggregator website Rotten Tomatoes gives the first season a score of 57% with an average rating of 6.35/10. The critics consensus states "The rebooted Magnum P.I. may not be quite distinctive enough to hold up to comparisons with its source material, but a charismatic star, slickly staged action, and a handful of modern twists hint at greater potential." Metacritic, which uses a weighted average, gives the season a 48 out of 100 indicating "mixed or average" reviews. Prior to the first episodes airing Digital Spy said that rebooting Magnum, P.I. was a "terrible idea". The original announcement received a primarily negative response from fans of the original but later received mixed reviews after the series premiered. When comparing the season to the original series USA Today stated that "Magnum (the P.I.) isn't the same, but for better or worse, he isn't all that different, either." Deadline Hollywood called the opening scene to the pilot episode "unbelievable" but later said "this new take on Magnum P.I. isn’t just a stunt to feed a hunger for nostalgia. It’s a fun action series that will provide entertaining television that has the spirit of the classic but with modern appeal."

=== Awards and nominations ===
The season was nominated for two Imagen Awards at the 34th Annual Imagen Awards. The season as a whole was nominated for Best Primetime Drama Program. The award was won and tied with the FX drama Pose. Additionally, Hernandez was nominated for Best Television Actor. The award was lost to Jon Seda for his work on the NBC police procedural Chicago P.D.

=== Ratings ===
Viewership and ratings per episode of Magnum P.I. (2018 TV series) season 1
No.	Title	Air date	Timeslot (ET)	Rating/share (18–49)	Viewers (millions)	DVR (18–49)	DVR viewers (millions)	Total (18–49)	Total viewers (millions)
1	"I Saw the Sun Rise"	September 24, 2018	Monday; 9:00 p.m.	1.2/5	8.12	0.7	3.86	1.9	11.99
2	"From the Head Down"	October 1, 2018	Monday; 9:00 p.m.	0.9/4	6.23	0.6	2.90	1.5	9.14
3	"The Woman Who Never Died"	October 8, 2018	Monday; 9:00 p.m.	0.9/4	6.08	0.5	2.76	1.4	8.84
4	"Six Paintings, One Frame"	October 15, 2018	Monday; 9:00 p.m.	0.9/4	5.48	0.4	2.28	1.3	7.77
5	"Sudden Death"	October 22, 2018	Monday; 9:00 p.m.	0.8/3	5.63	0.5	2.32	1.3	7.95
6	"Death Is Only Temporary"	October 29, 2018	Monday; 9:00 p.m.	0.8/3	5.69	0.5	2.47	1.3	8.17
7	"The Cat Who Cried Wolf"	November 5, 2018	Monday; 9:00 p.m.	0.8/3	5.27	0.5	2.65	1.3	7.87
8	"Die He Said"	November 12, 2018	Monday; 9:00 p.m.	0.8/3	5.50	0.3	2.12	1.1	7.62
9	"The Ties That Bind"	November 19, 2018	Monday; 9:00 p.m.	0.8/3	5.39	0.4	2.40	1.2	7.79
10	"Bad Day to Be a Hero"	December 10, 2018	Monday; 9:00 p.m.	0.8/3	5.47	0.4	2.33	1.2	7.81
11	"Nowhere to Hide"	January 14, 2019	Monday; 9:00 p.m.	0.8/3	6.02	0.5	2.44	1.3	8.46
12	"Winner Takes All"	January 20, 2019	Sunday; 10:00 p.m.	2.4/11	8.76	—N/a	1.54	—N/a	10.32
13	"Day of the Viper"	January 21, 2019	Monday; 9:00 p.m.	0.7/3	5.33	—N/a	2.36	—N/a	7.69
14	"I, The Deceased"	January 28, 2019	Monday; 9:00 p.m.	0.8/3	5.69	0.5	2.56	1.3	8.25
15	"Day the Past Came Back"	February 18, 2019	Monday; 9:00 p.m.	0.8/3	5.97	0.5	2.48	1.3	8.45
16	"Murder is Never Quiet"	February 25, 2019	Monday; 9:00 p.m.	0.9/4	6.29	—N/a	2.29	—N/a	8.58
17	"Black is the Widow"	March 4, 2019	Monday; 9:00 p.m.	0.7/3	5.61	0.4	2.39	1.1	8.00
18	"A Kiss Before Dying"	March 11, 2019	Monday; 9:00 p.m.	0.7/3	6.05	0.4	2.30	1.1	8.35
19	"Blood in the Water"	March 25, 2019	Monday; 9:00 p.m.	0.7/3	5.74	0.4	2.44	1.1	8.19
20	"The Day It All Came Together"	April 1, 2019	Monday; 9:00 p.m.	0.7/3	5.54	0.4	2.42	1.1	7.96

== Home media ==
Magnum P.I.: Season 1
Set details	Special features	
20 episodes; 5-disc set; Subtitles: English	Aloha Magnum!; Launch promos; Deleted & extended scenes on select episodes; Gag reel; Kumu & Katsumoto; Magnum P.I. – the rising of the sun: season 1; Scoring Magnum P.I.; Watch! Magazine shoot with Jay Hernandez	
DVD release dates
Region 1	Region 2	Region 4
June 11, 2019	TBA	N/a
Blu-ray release dates
Region A		Region B
TBA		TBA
