= List of Hawaii Five-0 characters =

List of Hawaii Five-0 characters may refer to:

- List of Hawaii Five-O (1968 TV series) characters, from the original 1968 TV series
- List of Hawaii Five-0 (2010 TV series) characters, from the 2010 reboot of the original series
