= Hawaii Five-0 (2010 TV series) season 8 =

Season of television series

Hawaii Five-0
- Season 8
- Season 8 U.S. DVD cover
- Showrunners: Peter M. Lenkov; Eric Guggenheim
- Starring: Alex O'Loughlin; Scott Caan; Meaghan Rath; Jorge Garcia; Taylor Wily; Dennis Chun; Kimee Balmilero; Chi McBride; Beulah Koale; Ian Anthony Dale
- No. of episodes: 25

Release
- Original network: CBS
- Original release: September 29, 2017 – May 18, 2018

Season chronology
- ← Previous; Season 7 Next → Season 9

The eighth season of the CBS police procedural drama series Hawaii Five-0 premiered on September 29, 2017, for the 2017–18 television season. CBS renewed the series for a 23 episode eighth season on March 23, 2017. On November 6, 2017, CBS ordered an additional episode for the season and did the same again on February 8, 2018 bringing the count to 25 episodes. The season concluded on May 18, 2018. The eighth season ranked No. 18 for the 2017–18 television season and had an average of 11 million viewers. The series was also renewed for a ninth season.

Due to pay disputes, this was the first season not to feature Daniel Dae Kim and Grace Park. This was also the first full season not to feature Masi Oka following his departure in the thirteenth episode of the seventh season. Meaghan Rath and Beulah Koale joined as new main cast members. In addition, longtime recurring cast members Dennis Chun, Kimee Balmilero, and Taylor Wily were promoted to series regulars, while another longtime recurring cast member Ian Anthony Dale joined as a series regular and appeared in episodes seven through twenty.

== Cast and characters ==
=== Main cast ===
- Alex O'Loughlin as Lieutenant Commander Steven "Steve" McGarrett, United States Navy Reserve
- Scott Caan as Detective Sergeant Daniel "Danny" "Danno" Williams
- Meaghan Rath as Officer Tani Rey
- Jorge Garcia as Special Consultant Jerry Ortega
- Taylor Wily as Kamekona Tupuola
- Dennis Chun as Sergeant Duke Lukela, Honolulu Police Department
- Kimee Balmilero as Dr. Noelani Cunha, Medical Examiner
- Chi McBride as Captain Lou Grover
- Beulah Koale as Junior Reigns, Police Candidate, later Officer assigned to Five-0 Task Force
- Ian Anthony Dale as Adam Noshimuri, head of Five-0 Special Division of Organized Crime

=== Recurring cast ===
- Zach Sulzbach as Charlie Williams
- Shawn Mokuahi Garnett as Flippa Tupuola
- Claire Forlani as Alicia Brown
- Andrew Lawrence as Eric Russo
- Kunal Sharma as Koa Rey
- Kekoa Kekumano as Nahele Huikala
- Christine Ko as Jessie Nomura

=== Guest stars ===
- Joey Lawrence as Aaron Wright, brother of world-class hacker Ian Wright
- Chris Vance as Harry Langford, former MI6 agent
- Paige Hurd as Samantha Grover
- Randy Couture as Jason Duclair
- Bob McCracken as DEA Agent Chris Reid
- Casper Van Dien as Roger Niles
- Steven Brand as John Walcott
- Derek Mio as Derek Okada
- Leonardo Nam as Harley Taylor
- Reggie Lee as Joey Kang
- Erika Brown as adult Grace Williams
- Joey Defore as 20 year-old Charlie Williams
- Chosen Jacobs as Will Grover
- Devon Sawa as Brad Woodward
- Shawn Anthony Thomsen as Pua Kai
- Michael Imperioli as Odell Martin
- Claire van der Boom as Rachel Hollander
- Frankie Faison as Leroy Davis
- Ryan Bittle as John McGarrett
- Susan Park as Noriko Noshimuri
- Michelle Borth as Catherine Rollins
- Terry O'Quinn as Joe White
- Willie Garson as Gerard Hirsch
- Vincent Pastore as Vito Russo
- Robyn Lively as Helen Meech

== Episodes ==
No. overall	No. in season	Title	Directed by	Written by	Original release date	Prod. code	U.S. viewers (millions)
169	1	"A'ole e 'olelo mai ana ke ahi ua ana ia" "Fire Will Never Say that It Has Had Enough"	Bryan Spicer	Peter M. Lenkov & Eric Guggenheim & Rob Hanning	September 29, 2017	801	8.64
Five-0 investigates a world class hacker (Joey Lawrence), who turns out to be the brother of serial hacker Ian Wright, after the former hacks into the Hawaii State prison and releases serial murderer/arsonist Jason DuClair (Randy Couture). DuClair soon leads the team on a manhunt that ends with a massive wildfire. McGarrett and Danny recruit lifeguard and former police candidate Tani Rey (Meaghan Rath) to join the task force to assist them but she is reluctant to do so. McGarrett and Danny invest in a restaurant. Note: This is the first episode to feature Meaghan Rath, Taylor Wily, Dennis Chun, and Kimee Balmilero as series regulars.
170	2	"Na La 'Ilio" "Dog Days"	Tara Miele	David Wolkove & Matt Wheeler	October 6, 2017	803	8.53
After a failed DEA drug bust, Five-0 teams up with them to solve the case. Steve finds one of the DEA agent's dog shot, and later adopts him, naming him Eddie. Former Navy SEAL Junior Reigns (Beulah Koale) turns to McGarrett looking for a job. Steve initially turns him down, after he insists Steve introduces him to Duke Lukela then informs Junior that to become a part of the task force he will need to join and finish the Police academy. Note: This is the first episode to feature Beulah Koale as a series regular.
171	3	"Kau pahi, ko'u kua. Kau pu, ko'u po'o." "Your Knife, My Back. My Gun, Your Head."	Eagle Egilsson	David Wolkove & Matt Wheeler	October 13, 2017	802	8.51
Five-0 with the help of former MI6 agent Harry Langford (guest star Chris Vance) investigate the murder of Jimmy Okada and 9 members of his crime family. Danny and Steve try their best by making dinner for Langford and his date.
172	4	"E uhi wale no 'a'ole e nalo, he imu puhi" "No Matter How Much One Covers a Steaming Imu, The Smoke Will Rise"	Antonio Negret	Rob Hanning	October 20, 2017	804	8.67
Five-0's confidential informant Toast is murdered during a phone call between him and McGarrett. Five-0 turns to Aaron Wright (Joey Lawrence) for help, but when Tani is ambushed in the hotel room with Wright, the team realise that Wright is behind the leak of their confidential informants. Kamekona is abducted by Joey Kang and beaten for information about money that Kang lost before he was captured. On another hand, Junior is proving efficient at the shooting field at the HPD academy, but after McGarrett finds him at a building set up for homeless people, he decides Junior can live with him while finishing at the academy.
173	5	"Kama'oma'o, ka 'aina huli hana" "At Kama'oma'o, The Land of Activities"	Bronwen Hughes	Peter M. Lenkov & Eric Guggenheim	November 3, 2017	805	8.63
On Halloween, Five-0, with the help of Alicia Brown (Claire Forlani), investigate the death of Tyler Riggins who is found dead in his truck stranded on the old Pali Highway. They are able to connect the recent murder of Bryon Hansen with Riggins’ murder and discover that the murders are heavily based on old Hawaiian folklore and that it is the killer's pattern. On the mainland, Grover speaks to a captive named Sebastian Wake, who gives the information about Clay Maxwell murdering his wife before he is executed.
174	6	"Mohala I Ka Wai Ka Maka O Ka Pua" "Unfolded by the Water Are the Faces of the Flowers"	Carlos Bernard	Eric Guggenheim & Zoe Robyn	November 10, 2017	808	9.21
A man with a multiple personality disorder, including a child and a protective father, takes on the identity of a Honolulu Police Department officer and commits a series of murders. Five-0 must do everything they can to find him. Steve's friends hold an intervention and hire a stress evaluator to try and help McGarrett reduce his stress.
175	7	"Kau Ka ‘Onohi Ali’i I Luna" "The Royal Eyes Rest Above"	Bryan Spicer	Peter M. Lenkov & Eric Guggenheim	November 17, 2017	807	9.17
After picking up Adam (Ian Anthony Dale) from the airport, McGarrett receives a call from Junior about a bank robbery in progress. Adam, Junior, and Steve then enter the bank and learn that the criminals escaped through a tunneled out hole in the safe. Tani keeps her brother, Koa, from being arrested in a drug bust, not knowing that they were being recorded by street cameras. Adam is forced to return to an empty home without Kono. Note: This is the first episode to feature Ian Anthony Dale as a series regular.
176	8	"He Kaha Lu'u Ke Ala, Mai Ho'okolo Aku" "The Trail Leads to a Diving Place; Do Not Follow After"	Ron Underwood	Liz Alper & Ally Seibert	December 1, 2017	806	8.56
Five-0 is asked to investigate the plane crash of a stunt plane which took the life of the famous stunt pilot Jason Sachs. Despite being refused access to investigate evidence by the NTSB, the team discovers it was a cover up, and take the lead investigator Callahan into custody. It’s later revealed that the real Sachs died in a car crash 6 years ago, and that the one that died was actually an informant undercover in the Guillermo crime family. Also, when a stunt plane happens to crash with Steve in it taking over for Nixon, he successfully manages to land.
177	9	"Make Me Kai" "Death at Sea"	Maja Vrvilo	David Wolkove & Matt Wheeler	December 8, 2017	809	9.07
Five-0 investigates a woman who was found adrift at sea unconscious. McGarrett, Danny, Tani and Junior discover a yacht abandoned at sea and find 11 dead bodies. McGarrett suspects that these victims were killed with a deadly bioweapon and fears that he and his team are exposed. Adam, Grover and Jerry have only 8 hours to track down the people responsible and find an antidote to save the team. While in quarantine, Tani beats Steve at chess resoundingly (the game is actually the famous Opera Game won by Paul Morphy).
178	10	"I Ka Wa Ma Mua, I Ka Wa Ma Hope" "The Future Is in the Past"	Peter Weller	Zoe Robyn	December 15, 2017	810	8.48
Following the events of the previous episode, the team is recovering at the hospital in quarantine. The room is breached by a gunman and Danny is shot. The team is unable to leave the room because an explosive is placed on the door. While unconscious, Danny dreams of a future where Grace is marrying Will Grover, Charlie becomes a member of the Honolulu Police Department and is offered a job on Five-0 by Tani, Adam and Kono have a child, and Tani is the new leader of the Five-0 Task Force at the rank of Captain and is married to Junior.
179	11	"Oni Kalalea Ke Ku A Ka La'au Loa" "A Tall Tree Stands Above the Others"	Tara Miele	Rob Hanning	December 15, 2017	811	7.71
On Christmas Eve, Danny tells Charlie a bedtime story about injured veterans helping Five-0 after Steve witnesses the aftermath of a gang of robbers dressed as Santa Claus. Also, Junior officially becomes a member of the Five-0 Task Force.
180	12	"Ka Hopu Nui 'Ana" "The Round Up"	Eagle Egilsson	David Wolkove & Matt Wheeler	January 5, 2018	812	9.96
When a government task-force is set up in the state with a goal to reduce gang related violence, a member of the task force is killed in a bombing. The Five-0 Task Force teams up with the government task-force, HPD, and the National Guard to solve the murder. Later, Steve asks Adam to head up a special division within the Five-0 Task Force which focuses solely on organized crime which he accepts.
181	13	"O Ka Mea Ua Hala, Ua Hala Ia" "What Is Gone Is Gone"	Roderick Davis	Sean O'Reilly	January 12, 2018	813	9.38
When Lou and his son come across a man attempting to commit suicide, they learn he’s charged with murdering his wife, but keeps protesting his innocence. Grover attempts to talk to him down while the rest of the team investigates the case in an attempt to prove his innocence.
182	14	"Na Keiki A Kalaihaohia" "The Children of Kalaihaohia"	Peter Weller	Story by : Peter M. Lenkov; Teleplay by : Eric Guggenheim	January 19, 2018	814	9.14
After Steve and Danny's restaurant is robbed, McGarrett and Danny enlist the help of Pua Kai at the Honolulu police to track down their stolen tools. Five-0 investigates a diamond smuggler corpse stolen from a graveyard. They must track down his partner before the stolen diamonds are smuggled out of Hawaii. Also, Adam recruits the first member of his organized crime task force as a confidential informant. At the same time, he helps Tani’s brother Koa get a job in construction, only to find Koa overdosed on drugs.
183	15	"He Puko'a Kani 'Aina" "A Coral Reef Strengthens Out into Land"	Bryan Spicer	David Wolkove & Matt Wheeler	February 2, 2018	815	8.56
Five-0 investigates the murder of a private detective and his client, both killed in the same way. Adam puts his organized crime task force into full effect by putting Jessie into a dangerous undercover mission which leads to Adam getting kidnapped. Also, Danny’s eccentric Uncle Vito (Vincent Pastore) comes to Hawaii to help Danny and McGarrett get their restaurant off the ground, but runs into some problems in the process.
184	16	"O Na Hoku O Ka Lani Ka I 'Ike Ia Pae" "Only the Stars of Heaven Know Where Pae Is"	Jerry Levine	David Wolkove & Matt Wheeler	March 2, 2018	816	8.00
Adam is tied up alone, covered by ants, and screaming, inside a shipping container in the middle of the forest. He is forced to tell his kidnapper about hidden money from his Yakuza days. Meanwhile, Tani and Junior go undercover to a private school as prospective parents in an attempt to solve a missing person's case. After attending some school functions, they receive enough information to make an arrest, but the suspect confirms McGarrett's suspicions about the real culprit. Also, Danny's uncle Vito attempts to assist Danny and McGarrett in expediting their liquor license application, but winds up getting arrested.
185	17	"Holapu Ke Ahi, Koe Iho Ka Lehu" "The Fire Blazed Up, Then Only Ashes Were Left"	Maja Vrvilo	Liz Alper & Ally Seibert	March 9, 2018	817	7.68
Adam & Jessie pull off a dangerous robbery of Chlorine gas as part of their undercover sting operation. However, when two tanks of the gas go missing, Adam assists Five-0 in tracking them down to prevent a chemical weapon from being unleashed on the island. Also, Adam confronts Jessie about her true loyalties.
186	18	"E Ho'Oko Kuleana" "To Do One's Duty"	Alex O'Loughlin	David Wolkove & Matt Wheeler	March 30, 2018	818	7.80
When Adam is pulled over by HPD and a dead body is found in the trunk of his car, he is arrested by the FBI. The Five-0 Task Force must prove his innocence before he gets sent to prison again. Jessie is their first suspect as she admits to having an affair with one of Hideki’s lieutenants. Meanwhile, Junior and Tani must walk a beat as new recruits. Also, Danny meets with the wife of the person who shot him in quarantine.: This episode marks the directional debut of Alex O'Loughlin (Steve McGarrett).
187	19	"Aohe Mea Make I Ka Hewa; Make No I Ka Mihi Ole" "No One Has Ever Died For the Mistakes He Has Made; Only Because He Didn't Repent"	Jennifer Lynch	Rob Hanning & Ashley Dizon	April 6, 2018	819	7.97
A man Steve's father, John McGarrett, was investigating for murder comes forward to Five-0 and reveals where he buried all the bodies back in the 1970s & 1980s. Also Adam's newly discovered half-sister orders Adam to pay her $20,000,000 in exchange for the safety of Kono, Chin, Sara, and Abby. Danny, Jerry, and Lou deal with a harsh fire marshal determining the safety of the Five-0 offices.
188	20	"He Lokomaika’I Ka Manu O Kaiona" "Kind Is the Bird of Kaiona"	Bryan Spicer	Rob Hanning & Sean O'Reilly	April 13, 2018	820	7.48
Former Five-0 member Lieutenant Catherine Rollins returns to Hawaii and asks Five-0 to assist the Central Intelligence Agency in finding a suspected terrorist who is building dirty bombs using uranium that was left behind by the Navy in a former military bunker. Meanwhile, when Adam's confidential informant Jessie is murdered after she stole Adam's $20,000,000, he decides to shut down his organized crime task force and move back to the mainland with Kono. Elsewhere, Junior falls and injures himself during a run and relies on McGarrett's dog Eddie to find help. Later, McGarrett is informed that Noriko, Adam's half-sister, was found dead when her body washed up on a beach.
189	21	"Ahuwale Ka Nane Huna" "The Answer To The Riddle Is Seen"	Eagle Egilsson	David Wolkove & Matt Wheeler	April 20, 2018	821	7.52
When an anonymous person mails Five-0 a videocassette recording of a murder from many years ago, Junior, Lou, and Tani must find out who the victim and murderer are. Meanwhile, former MI6 agent Harry Langford returns to the island, providing private security for distant relatives of the Royal Family, with McGarrett and Danny tagging along to help find their teenage daughter who has gone missing.
190	22	"Kopi Wale No I Ka I'a A 'Eu No Ka Ilo" "Though the Fish is Well Salted, the Maggots Crawl"	Ruba Nadda	Rob Hanning & Rachael Paradis	April 27, 2018	822	7.79
After Duke's granddaughter is kidnapped, he is forced to take evidence from an ongoing HPD murder case. However, before he can return what the kidnappers asked for, the evidence is stolen from Duke. Also, to solve a murder, Jerry goes undercover at a mental hospital.
191	23	"Ka Hana A Ka Makua, O Ka Hana No Ia A Keiki" "What Parents Will Do, Children Will Do"	Jim Jost	Peter M. Lenkov & Matt Wheeler	May 4, 2018	823	7.04
Cammy Lin is witness to the murder of mob boss Tommy Boyle in his own home. She and her mother Mei escape, but she is murdered in their attempt. During the investigation, Five-0 discover that the FBI has been keeping tabs on Conor Boyle, Tommy’s son, for an active investigation. Meanwhile, Steve also has Eddie checked at the vet. Elsewhere, he attempts to help Danny in Kung-fu fighting, which the latter isn’t pleased by.
192	24	"Ka Lala Kaukonakona Haki 'Ole I Ka Pa A Ka Makani Kona" "The Tough Branch That Does Not Break in the Kona Gale"	Krishna Rao	Story by : Alex O'Loughlin; Teleplay by : Zoe Robyn	May 11, 2018	825	7.09
Junior is recalled last-minute by the SEALs on a mission to Nigeria, but is joined by McGarrett after finding out that the mission is to free an American hostage: Joe White. Meanwhile, Kamekona and Gerard Hirsch bring a case of stolen artwork to Lou & Tani, insisting on doing the crime investigation with them.
193	25	"Waiho Wale Kahiko" "Ancients Exposed"	Bryan Spicer	Peter M. Lenkov & Eric Guggenheim	May 18, 2018	824	6.62
When a rogue Russian submarine appears off the shore of Honolulu and causes panic to the island, Five-0 must solve the mystery of why it's there. Meanwhile, Steve and Danny hire Kamekona and Flippa as silent partners to their restaurant they begin making a lot of changes without consulting them. Later, Tani confides in Junior by telling him that she found a gun in Adam's house which matches to the slugs found in Noriko.

== Production ==
On March 23, 2017, CBS renewed the series for an eighth season, which premiered on September 29, 2017. Filming for the season began on July 8, 2017 with a traditional Hawaiian blessing. Series star Alex O'Loughlin made both his writer and directorial debut during the season. O'Loughlin directed the eighteenth episode of the season and wrote the story for the twenty-fourth episode of the season. The final script for the season was written around early March 2018. Filming on the final episode of the season concluded in the third week of April. The final episode of the season aired on May 18, 2018.

=== Daniel Dae Kim's and Grace Park's departure controversies ===
On June 30, 2017, ahead of the series's eighth season, it was announced that series regulars Daniel Dae Kim and Grace Park would be departing the series due to a salary dispute with CBS. Kim and Park had been seeking pay equality with co-stars Alex O'Loughlin and Scott Caan, but did not reach satisfactory deals with CBS Television Studios. CBS's final offer to Kim and Park was 10–15% lower than what O'Loughlin and Caan make in salary. An update of their characters was given in the first episode of the season and in various other episodes throughout the season.

=== Casting ===
Following Kim's and Park's departures it was announced that longtime recurring cast member Ian Anthony Dale who portrays Kono Kalakaua's husband Adam Noshimuri had been upped to series regular for the eighth season. It was also announced that Meaghan Rath and Beulah Koale would join the series as new characters and new members of Five-0.

On July 21, 2017, it was announced that recurring cast members Taylor Wily, Kimee Balmilero, and Dennis Chun would also be upped to series regulars for the eighth season.

On September 28, 2017 in an interview with executive producer Peter Lenkov he was asked if Christine Lahti had a chance in returning during the season. Lenkov stated "Yes, well, we haven’t written the episode. There is an episode that we’re talking about, but it all depends on scheduling." However, the story wasn't written and no updates were given. Joey Lawrence starred in two episodes of the season as Aaron Wright's brother of Ian Wright, played by Nick Jonas who appeared in two episodes during season 4. Chris Vance also returned as a guest star and appeared in two episodes as former MI6 agent Harry Langford. It was later announced on March 19, 2018 that previous main cast member Michelle Borth would return as a guest star in the season's twentieth episode. Terry O'Quinn also returned as a guest star in the season's twenty-fourth episode. Teilor Grubbs did not appear at all in the season for the first time since the beginning of the series.

Ian Anthony Dale returned to the series in episode seven and made his final appearance of the season in episode twenty due to conflicting filming of other CBS television show Salvation in which he is also a series regular.

== Reception ==
=== Ratings ===
No.	Episode	Air date	18-49 rating	Viewers (millions)	Weekly rank	Live+7 18–49	Live+7 viewers (millions)
1	A'ole e 'olelo mai ana ke ahi ua ana ia	September 29, 2017	1.0	8.64	#22	1.8	11.91
2	Na La 'Ilio	October 6, 2017	1.1	8.53	#16	—N/a	11.55
3	Kau pahi, ko'u kua. Kau pu, ko'u po'o	October 13, 2017	1.0	8.51	#16	—N/a	11.39
4	E uhi wale no 'a'ole e nalo, he imu puhi	October 20, 2017	1.0	8.67	#15	1.7	11.54
5	Kama'oma'o, ka 'aina huli hana	November 3, 2017	0.9	8.63	#15	1.6	11.56
6	Mohala I Ka Wai Ka Maka O Ka Pua	November 10, 2017	1.1	9.21	#17	—N/a	12.13
7	Kau Ka ‘Onohi Ali’i I Luna	November 17, 2017	1.0	9.17	#16	—N/a	11.87
8	He Kaha Lu'u Ke Ala, Mai Ho'okolo Aku	December 1, 2017	0.9	8.56	#17	1.6	11.70
9	Make Me Kai	December 8, 2017	1.1	9.07	#9	1.7	11.95
10	I Ka Wa Ma Mua, I Ka Wa Ma Hope	December 15, 2017	0.9	8.48	#13	—N/a	—N/a
11	Oni Kalalea Ke Ku A Ka La'au Loa	December 15, 2017	0.9	7.71	#15	—N/a	—N/a
12	Ka Hopu Nui 'Ana	January 5, 2018	1.2	9.96	#8	—N/a	—N/a
13	Na Keiki A Kalaihaohia	January 12, 2018	1.1	9.38	#10	—N/a	12.30
14	Oni Kalalea Ke Ku A Ka La'au Loa	January 19, 2018	1.0	9.14	#10	1.7	12.19
15	He puko'a kani'aina	February 2, 2018	1.0	8.56	#9	1.7	11.91
16	O Na Hoku O Ka Lani Ka I 'Ike Ia Pae	March 2, 2018	0.9	8.00	#15	—N/a	10.94
17	Holapu ke ahi, koe iho ka lehu	March 9, 2018	0.9	7.68	#18	1.6	10.67
18	E Ho'Oko Kuleana	March 30, 2018	1.0	7.80	#17	—N/a	10.87
19	Aohe Mea Make I Ka Hewa; Make No I Ka Mihi Ole	April 6, 2018	0.9	7.97	#16	1.5	10.83
20	He Lokomaika’I Ka Manu O Kaiona	April 13, 2018	0.9	7.48	#14	1.5	10.51
21	Ahuwale Ka Nane Huna	April 20, 2018	0.9	7.52	#14	—N/a	10.28
22	Kopi Wale No I Ka I'a A 'Eu No Ka Ilo	April 27, 2018	0.9	7.79	#10	1.4	10.48
23	Ka Hana A Ka Makua, O Ka Hana No Ia A Keiki	May 4, 2018	0.7	7.04	#16	1.3	9.78
24	Ka Lala Kaukonakona Haki 'Ole I Ka Pa A Ka Makani Kona	May 11, 2018	0.8	7.09	#19	—N/a	9.76
25	Waiho Wale Kahiko	May 18, 2018	0.7	6.62	#15	TBA	TBA

== Home video release ==
Hawaii Five-0: The Eighth Season
Set details			Special features
25 episodes; 6-disc set; 1.78:1 aspect ratio; Languages: English (Dolby Digital 5.1, with subtitles); Subtitles in English, Spanish, and Portuguese			Behind the scenes; Deleted scenes
Release Dates			Behind the scenes; Deleted scenes
Region 1	Region 2	Region 4	Behind the scenes; Deleted scenes
September 4, 2018	September 10, 2018	TBA	Behind the scenes; Deleted scenes
