= List of Hawaii Five-0 (2010 TV series) characters =

This is a list of fictional characters in the television series Hawaii Five-0, which aired on CBS from 2010 to 2020. The article deals with the series' main, recurring, and minor characters.

Casts of Hawaii Five-0

Cast of Hawaii Five-0 season 2 from left to right:

Grace Park as Officer Kono Kalakaua, Daniel Dae Kim as Lieutenant Chin Ho Kelly, Alex O'Loughlin as Lieutenant Commander Steve McGarrett, Scott Caan as Detective Danny "Danno" Williams, and Lauren German as Special Agent Lori Weston. Missing: Masi Oka as Dr. Max Bergman.

Full cast of Hawaii Five-0 seasons 8 and 9 from left to right:

Jorge Garcia as Special Consultant Jerry Ortega, Chi McBride as Captain Lou Grover, Beulah Koale as Officer Junior Reigns, Meghan Rath as Officer Tani Rey, Scott Caan as Detective Danny Williams, Alex O'Loughlin as Lieutenant Commander Steve McGarrett, Ian Anthony Dale as Adam Noshimuri, Kimee Balmilero as Medical Examiner Dr. Noelani Cunha, Dennis Chun as Sergeant Duke Lukela, and Taylor Wily as Kamekona Tupola.

== Main ==
Name	Portrayed by	Seasons									
Name	Portrayed by	1	2	3	4	5	6	7	8	9	10
Steve McGarrett	Alex O'Loughlin	Main									
Danny "Danno" Williams	Scott Caan	Main									
Chin Ho Kelly	Daniel Dae Kim	Main									
Kono Kalakaua	Grace Park	Main									
Mary Ann McGarrett	Taryn Manning	Also starring (Note: Received main billing only in the episodes in which they appeared during the season)	Guest				Guest			Guest	
Dr. Max Bergman	Masi Oka	Recurring	Main (Note: Episodes 1–13 of season 7 only.)								Guest
Lori Weston	Lauren German		Also starring (Note: Episodes 2–4 guest; episodes 5–16 main.)								
Catherine Rollins	Michelle Borth	Recurring	Guest	Main		Guest	Recurring	Guest			
Lou Grover	Chi McBride				Also starring (Note: Episodes 1–9 recurring; episodes 10–22 main.)	Main					
Jerry Ortega	Jorge Garcia				Recurring	Main (Note: Episode 1 of season 10 only.)					
Tani Rey	Meaghan Rath								Main		
Kamekona Tupuola	Taylor Wily	Recurring							Main		
Duke Lukela	Dennis Chun	Recurring							Main		
Allison	Kimee Balmilero			Guest							
Dr. Noelani Cunha	Kimee Balmilero							Recurring	Main		
Junior Reigns	Beulah Koale								Main		
Adam Noshimuri	Ian Anthony Dale		Recurring						Main (Note: Episodes 7–20 of season 8, 7–25 of season 9.)		
Quinn Liu	Katrina Law										Main

=== Chin Ho Kelly ===
Chin Ho Kelly
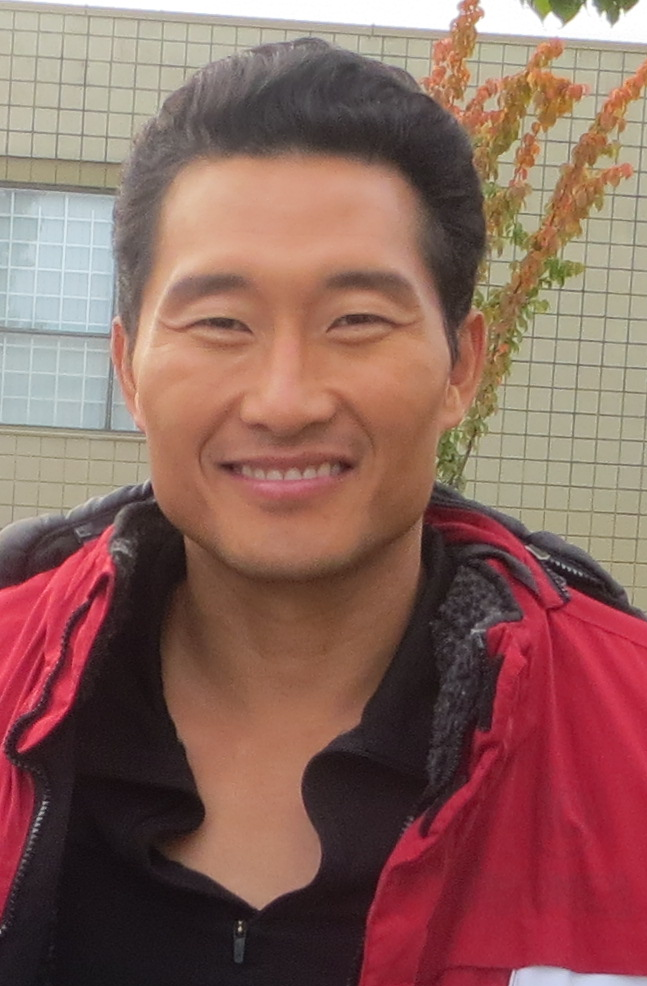
- Daniel Dae Kim portrayed Chin Ho Kelly in the reboot
- First appearance: Pilot (episode 1.01)
- Last appearance: "Ua Mau Ke Ea O Ka Aina I Ka Pono" / "The Life of the Land is Perpetuated in Righteousness" (episode 7.25)
- Portrayed by: Daniel Dae Kim
- Other appearances: NCIS: Los Angeles ("Touch of Death"); MacGyver ("Flashlight")

In-universe information
- Nickname: Chin
- Title: Detective Lieutenant
- Occupation: Head of the SFPD Five-0 Task Force; Member of the Five-0 Task Force (formerly); Police officer/Detective, Honolulu PD (formerly)
- Family: Kam Tong Kelly (father, deceased)
- Spouse: Malia Waincroft (deceased)
- Significant other: Abby Dunn
- Relatives: Sara Malia Diaz Waincroft (Niece; Ward); Keako (uncle); Mele (aunt, deceased); Kono Kalakaua (cousin); Gabriel Waincroft (brother-in-law, deceased)

Chin Ho Kelly (portrayed by Daniel Dae Kim) is a member of the Five-0 task force and cousin of Kono Kalakaua. Kim also portrayed Chin in a crossover episode with NCIS: Los Angeles, and in another crossover episode with MacGyver. Daniel Dae Kim was nominated for the Teen Choice Award for Choice TV Actor: Action, in 2011 and 2012, for his portrayal of Chin.

Lieutenant Chin Ho Kelly is the third member of Five-0. He was a former Honolulu Police Department police officer who left the force due to false allegations of corruption. He is close friends with the McGarrett family as his late father Kam Tong was a long-time colleague of John in the HPD while Chin was trained by John during his rookie days patrolling the beat. In the pilot episode he was recruited by Steve for the new task force and often serves as the team's technical expert and designated sniper alongside his cousin Kono. Throughout the show, he is often seen manipulating the smart board in the office or fiddling with all things digital. He was married to Dr. Malia Waincroft, his long-time on-and-off girlfriend.

Chin attended Kukui High School and was the star quarterback until McGarrett broke his records as a sophomore. After that season, McGarrett was sent off to a military school on the mainland. As a high school student, Chin was described as being multi-talented with a wide variety of interests, having played football and was also in the math club and school band. Little is known about his early career with the Honolulu Police Department except that he had been assigned to District 5 (in real life, covering the areas from Kalihi to Salt Lake) and that Steve's father John was his training officer. He rose to the rank of Detective Lieutenant before leaving over false allegations that he had stolen money from the evidence locker. From his resignation up until Steve's return to Hawaii, Chin was working as a security guard. It is eventually revealed that it was his uncle, a retired cop himself, who had done it out of desperation over the expenses for his cancer-stricken wife's treatments. Kono confronts Chin about it but he flatly refused to turn his uncle in for fear that it would cause all the cases his uncle had solved to be reopened and the criminals would be released. After it became known that the allegations against Chin were false, he was reinstated to his rank and his badge returned to him.

In the season 2 finale cliffhanger, Chin is put in a difficult position after a group of corrupt ex-HPD cops simultaneously hold Kono hostage and threaten Malia in the couple's own house as part of a plot to free Frank Delano from Halawa. He chose to save his wife but Delano still orders his men to kill both women. Kono, bound and gagged, was pushed into the sea but was rescued by Adam, who was hiding nearby. The paramedics were unable to save Malia and she dies at home.

It is revealed in Season 4 that Chin's father was murdered fifteen years ago by his brother-in-law Gabriel Waincroft, who grew up to become a notorious drug lord despite Chin's efforts to set him straight. At that time, Chin and Malia, then rookies in their respective occupations, were dating and Malia had asked Chin to talk to her wayward younger brother, then a known juvenile delinquent. Kam Tong happened to be at the wrong place at the wrong time when Gabriel was ordered to kill someone as part of his gang initiation. Years later, at Kono and Adam's wedding, Gabriel confronts Chin and tells him that while he was sorry that Kam Tong was the unfortunate victim of his gang initiation, he blamed Chin for failing to protect Malia.

Unlike the other Five-0 members, Chin often rides a motorcycle to work. It has been said that "everyone" knew who Chin was and his intimate knowledge of the island of Oahu and Hawaiian culture, rapport with the locals and ability to speak Hawaiian often aids the team when dealing with locals who are often suspicious of haole cops (such as Danny). His "street smarts" and local knowledge complements Danny's experience as a detective and McGarrett's tactical know-how.

In Season 6 Chin starts a relationship with Detective Abby Dunn and that continued throughout the course of the season in to Season 7.

Also in season 6, Five-0 investigates a woman's murder where the woman's daughter, Sara, claims to have an uncle in the HPD: Chin. Chin learns that Sara's aunt was his deceased wife Malia, as the girl is Gabriel Waincroft's daughter. Soon after, before he dies, Gabriel apologizes for killing Chin's father and asks Chin to take care of Sara. At the beginning of season 7, Chin tries to get custody of the orphaned Sara, but her aunt and uncle on her mother's side win and take her to Mexico. Following Sara's kidnapping by the Diego drug cartel in a plot of revenge against Five-0, Sara's aunt and uncle relinquish her custody to Chin for her safety

At the end of Season 7, Chin is offered a chance to run the Five-0 Task Force that is being established by the San Francisco Police Department; it is revealed in the Season 8 premiere that he accepted and moved there with Abby and Sara.

Chin's pistol of choice is the SIG-Sauer P229R. He previously used the HPD standard-issue Smith & Wesson Model 5906.

=== Kono Kalakaua ===
Kono Kalakaua
- First appearance: Pilot (episode 1.01)
- Last appearance: "Ua Mau Ke Ea O Ka Aina I Ka Pono" / "The Life of the Land is Perpetuated in Righteousness" (episode 7.25)
- Portrayed by: Grace Park
- Other appearances: MacGyver

In-universe information
- Full name: Kono Kalakaua
- Title: Officer
- Occupation: Member of the Five-0 Task Force (formerly); Professional surfer (formerly)
- Family: Ke'ano Kalakaua (father); Nani Kalakaua (mother)
- Spouse: Adam Noshimuri (ex-husband)
- Relatives: Keako (uncle); Mele (aunt, deceased); Chin Ho Kelly (cousin)

Officer Kono Kalakaua is a fresh HPD academy graduate who was recruited by Steve for the new task force in the pilot episode. She is the cousin of Chin Ho Kelly. Despite her slight frame, she is well-versed in martial arts and is a skilled marksman (she is usually the designated sniper when the situation requires one).

Kono was a former professional surfer but a serious injury to her knee ended her career. She decides to join the "family trade" and was days away from graduating from the HPD academy when McGarrett recruited her for the new "Governor's Task Force", as Five-0 was initially called. In the first several episodes of season 1, she works under the watchful eye of her cousin and quickly wins the trust and confidence of the other team members. She is detained and questioned by the HPD, having been accused of stealing $10 million from an HPD asset forfeiture locker. While on suspension, she helps Chin and Danny go after Wo Fat, who was responsible for framing McGarrett for the murder of the Governor. To the members of the Five-0 task force and to the general public, Kono had been stripped of her badge by the Internal Affairs Department of the HPD, but it was later revealed to be a ploy for her to go undercover to bust a string of dirty ex-cops.

In Season 2, Kono began a relationship with Hiro Noshimuri's son, Adam. When Adam's brother, Michael, is released from prison, he kills someone with Kono's gun to frame her. She is cleared, but Adam has to kill Michael to protect her and Kono goes into hiding with Adam, skipping from one place to another to evade capture by vengeful yakuza members. At the beginning of Season 5, Adam starts to talk about marriage, and in the episode "Blackout" Kono accepts his proposal. They marry at the end of the season, but in the Season 6 pilot they are tortured by Chin's brother-in-law, Gabriel, who runs away with Adam's money. The money was to pay the yakuza to free Adam from his past. Without the money the yakuza's men persecute Adam and he is forced to kill them before discovering that Gabriel has paid off his debt with the yakuza. Upset, Adam goes to the police with Kono and he takes a plea deal for 18 months in prison.

At the end of Season 7, Kono left Hawaii for Carson City, Nevada, where she joined a multi-agency task force combating sex trafficking. In the season 8 episode I Ka Wa Ma Mua, I Ka Wa Ma Hope (The Future is in the Past) Danny dreams of the future and Kono has a child with Adam. However, midway through season 9, Adam returns to Hawaii and tells the team he and Kono have broken up.

=== Mary Ann McGarrett ===
Mary Ann McGarrett
- First appearance: Pilot (episode 1.01), (Deleted Scene) "Lankila" / "Victory" (episode 1.04), (Series Regular)
- Portrayed by: Taryn Manning

In-universe information
- Occupation: Flight Attendant (former); Caretaker (former)
- Family: Steve McGarrett (Brother); John McGarrett (Father), (deceased) Doris McGarrett (Mother)
- Children: Joan McGarrett (Adoptive Daughter)
- Relatives: Debora McGarrett (Aunt), (deceased) Steven McGarrett (Grandfather), (deceased)

Mary Ann McGarrett is the younger sister of Steve McGarrett. She, along with her brother, were both sent to the mainland after their mother was (presumably) murdered. Steve went to the Army and Navy Academy in Carlsbad, California, while she lived with their Aunt Deb several hours away. As a result, both siblings had harbored resentment over their father splitting up the family and drifted apart over the years; in the episode "Lanakila", she comments to her brother that the last time they met in person was at their mom's funeral over fifteen years ago. She is the "black sheep" of the family, wandering from job to job, and was said to be living in Los Angeles when Steve returns to Hawaii for good. In a scene deleted from the Pilot episode, Steve mentions bailing her out of trouble more than once and keeping it from their father to "let Dad go to his grave believing that you were his perfect little girl". She takes a job as a flight attendant but quit after her so-called friend Angela had betrayed her and took advantage of her naivete to be a mule for trafficking blood diamonds. In season 3 Mary returned to Hawaii working as a caretaker, originally not wanting to reconnect with Doris she later meets her after strong encouragement from Steve and the person she was caring after.

In season 4, Mary adopts a baby girl and names her Joan, after her father. Steve was initially against it but he comes to accept Joan after being forced to babysit her for the day. Since then, Mary and Steve have reconnected and she regularly sends him videos of Joan.

In the original show, Mary Ann only appeared in a two-episode arc. She was also estranged from her brother and was married and had an infant son who died of cancer. She was portrayed by Nancy Malone. In the reboot, the character features more in Steve's life and reconnected with him.

=== Dr. Max Bergman ===
Max Bergman
- First appearance: "Nalowale" / "Forgotten/Missing" (episode 1.05), (Guest Star) "Haʻiʻole" / "Unbreakable" (episode 2.01), (Series Regular)
- Last appearance: "Ua ho'i ka 'opua i Awalua" / "The Clouds Always Return to Alawua"" (episode 7.13) (series regular) "He 'oi'o kuhihewa; he kaka ola i 'ike 'ia e ka makaula" / "Don’t blame ghosts and spirits for one’s troubles; a human is responsible" (episode 10.05) (guest star)
- Portrayed by: Masi Oka

In-universe information
- Title: Doctor
- Occupation: Chief Medical Examiner
- Family: Mr. & Mrs. Bergman (adoptive parents)
- Spouse: Sabrina Lane
- Children: Tunde (adoptive son)
- Relatives: Machiyo Takeshita (biological mother; deceased)
- Religion: Judaism

Dr. Max Bergman is a former medical examiner who belonged to the City and County of Honolulu. Bergman was initially billed as a recurring character but Oka joined as a series regular and has been part of the main cast since Season 2.

Dr. Bergman was first introduced to Five-0 by Governor Jameson. He was playing the piano and then wordlessly proceeded to explain the victim's cause of death to Danny and McGarrett, before finally greeting them and introducing himself. He has the tendency to rattle off trivia, prompting the Five-0 team to cut him off and tell him to get to the point. Danny often mocks him with medical jokes. Despite his lack of social skills, he does get along with the other members of Five-0. He has a Halloween tradition of dressing up as a character from a Keanu Reeves film.

In the season 2 episode "Haʻalele", it is revealed that his biological mother, Machiyo Takeshita, was murdered by the notorious "Trashman", a serial killer in Hawaii from the 1980s who earned the nickname because his victims were all found in trash bags or the dumpster. He was born to a Japanese-American mother but adopted by a Jewish family, the Bergmans, after a short stint in foster care, hence his last name. As an undergraduate at Arizona State University, he was a self-confessed party boy and earned the nickname "Beerman".

Dr. Bergman is dating Sabrina Lane, a bank teller at Hawaii National Bank. He first saw her in the episode "Haʻawe Make Loa / Death Wish" while at the bank and had a crush on her at first sight. A botched bank robbery took place minutes later resulting in Sabrina being shot and Dr. Bergman having to put his medical expertise to use while being held hostage. Following the incident, he eventually works up the nerve to ask her out. It is implied that they are in a relationship (as of Season 6 Episode 14) as she is mentioned by Dr. Bergman numerous times in conversations with other members of Five-0; Rumer Willis, who portrays Sabrina, has only appeared twice on the show. It is revealed in the season 7 episode "Ka hale ho'okauwel / House of Horrors" that he married Sabrina during his sabbatical.

Max retired from the Honolulu Medical Examiner's Office and from Five-0 in the season 7 episode "Ua ho'i ka 'opua i Awalua" and returned to Africa as a member of Doctors Without Borders.

=== Lori Weston ===
Lori Weston
- First appearance: "Ua Lawe Wale" / "Taken" (episode 2.02), (Guest Star) "Maʻemaʻe" / "Clean" (episode 2.05), (Series Regular)
- Last appearance: "I Helu Pu" / "The Reckoning" (episode 2.16), (Series Regular) "Ua ho'i ka 'opua i Awalua" / "The Clouds Always Return to Awalua" (episode 7.13), (Archive Footage)
- Portrayed by: Lauren German

In-universe information
- Title: Special Agent
- Occupation: Special Agent, DHS; Special Agent/Profiler, FBI (formerly)

Special Agent Lori Weston is a former DHS agent with a background as a profiler. Due to the circumstances of her assignment McGarrett initially views her with suspicion and assigns her to "babysit" the victim's parents in a kidnapping case on her first day on the job. A graduate of Pennsylvania State University, her background as a federal agent proves to be an asset, as she is able to take down suspects and quickly proves her worth. She returns to the DHS at Governor Denning's request when Five-0 get tangled in an incident with an employee of the Russian consulate.

As Catherine Rollins was deployed, she spends a lot of time with McGarrett, but the latter regards her a good friend rather than a romantic interest. She had developed a crush on him, but realizes that McGarrett has always been in love with Catherine. Before her departure, she hands him the UH season tickets she had bought.

The character is based on Lori Wilson, interpreted by Sharon Farrell in the original series of 1968. She becomes the principal of the series in the twelfth season.

=== Catherine Rollins ===
Catherine Rollins
- First appearance: "Lanakila" / "Victory" (episode 1.04), (Guest Star) "La O Na Makuahine" / "Mother's Day" (episode 3.01), (Series Regular)
- Last appearance: "O ka PiliʻOhana ka ʻOi" / "Family Comes First" (episode 4.21), (Series Regular) Aloha (episode 10.22), (Guest Star)
- Portrayed by: Michelle Borth

In-universe information
- Full name: Catherine Rollins
- Nickname: Cath
- Title: Lieutenant
- Occupation: Member of the Five-0 Task Force (inactive); Private investigator (formerly); United States Navy officer (formerly)
- Family: Unnamed parents
- Significant other: Steve McGarrett

Lieutenant Catherine "Cath" Rollins, USN (Ret.) is the on-off lover of Steve McGarrett. How or when they met is never fully explained, but it has been implied that they have known each for a long time. Their first date was revealed to have been in 2002. It is likely they would have had to keep their relationship a secret due to strict fraternization rules in the U.S. military and the fact that McGarrett outranked her.

Cath is a "Navy brat" and moved around frequently due to her father's various assignments. During Pro Bowl weekend, when asked why she supported the Dallas Cowboys, she explained that had never stayed in any one place long enough to feel an affinity for an NFL team. She herself joined the Navy and is an intelligence officer. Like McGarrett, her military service record remains vague. She previously dated Billy Harrington, one of McGarrett's SEAL buddies whom she had worked with.

Cath is first introduced in the Season 1 episode "Lanakila", when McGarrett calls her for "a favor". Later in the season, she stays with him while on leave, resulting in Danny commenting on how McGarrett had "that stupid smile" despite being called in on a Saturday to work a murder-abduction case.

In the season 4 episode "Makani ʻolu a holo malie/Fair Winds and Following Seas", Cath persuades McGarrett to go with her to Afghanistan to find a young boy named Najib. Najib's father had saved her when she was injured and separated from her unit while deployed to Kabul. McGarrett was captured by Taliban insurgents and is nearly beheaded but a team of Navy SEALs rescue him in the nick of time. As a result, he escapes a court-martial and returns stateside with a stern warning that "these rogue ops of yours are over". Cath decides to remain in Afghanistan to continue her search for Najib and bids a tearful goodbye to McGarrett over the satellite phone. It was implied that McGarrett never really moved on, as he never indicated any interest in any of the women Danny or Ellie Clayton attempted to set him up with.

Cath makes a surprise return in the season 5 finale for Kono and Adam's wedding. Steve welcomes her with a hug when she surprises him at his backyard. She remained for the first three episodes of the series sixth season however she leaves once again before Steve is able to propose, saying that she had something to do. A heartbroken Steve tells her that he could not wait for her any longer if she decides to leave again, and she departs in tears. However, she makes a call to an unidentified person stating that Steve believed her story and that she was "ready". She once again returned in the series seventh season for the shows 150th episode to inform Steve that his mother had been detained following an attempt to break Wo Fat's father out of prison. She assists Steve and the rest of the Five-0 Task Force in rescuing Doris McGarrett and Wo Fat's father. She returns again in the eighth season's twentieth episode, getting Steve's help once again to find someone making dirty bombs out of an unused military bunker's depleted uranium.

In the series finale, Catherine cracks the show's final mystery- a cypher Steve's dead mother Doris had left for him. This aids in the capture of the show's final villain- the wife of McGarrett's long-time nemesis Wo Fat. In the final moments of the series, Steve and Catherine are reunited as they get ready to depart Hawaii.

==== Awards and decorations ====
The following are the awards and decorations worn by Lt. Rollins.

Personal decorations
Navy & Marine Corps Commendation Medal, w/1 gold award star (2nd award)
Navy & Marine Corps Achievement Medal, w/1 gold award star (2nd award)
Unit awards
Navy Unit Commendation, w/1 bronze service star (2nd award)
Meritorious Unit Commendation
Campaign and service medals
National Defense Service Medal
Armed Forces Expeditionary Medal, w/1 bronze service star (2nd award)
Global War on Terrorism Expeditionary Medal
Global War on Terrorism Service Medal
Service and training awards
Sea Service Deployment Ribbon, w/1 bronze service star (2nd award)
Marksmanship awards
Navy Expert Pistol Shot Medal

Other accoutrements
Surface Warfare insignia

In "Kaʻoia iʻo Ma Loko", Catherine is honorably discharged from the United States Navy and is awarded her second Navy and Marine Corps Achievement Medal as an end-of-tour award.

=== Lou Grover ===
Lou Grover
- First appearance: "Aloha Ke Kahi I Ke Kahi" / "We Need Each Another" (episode 4.01), (Guest Star) "Hoʻonani Makuakane" / "Honor Thy Father" (episode 4.10), (Series Regular)
- Last appearance: "Aloha" / "Goodbye" (episode 10.22)
- Portrayed by: Chi McBride

In-universe information
- Full name: Louis Purnell Grover
- Title: Captain
- Occupation: Member of Five-0 Task Force; Head of SWAT, HPD (formerly); Head of SWAT/police officer, CPD (formerly)
- Family: Percy Lee Grover Sr. (father); Ella Grover (mother); Percy Lee Grover Jr. (brother)
- Spouse: Renée Grover
- Children: Will Grover (son); Samantha Grover (daughter)

Captain Louis Purnell "Lou" Grover is the former head of the Honolulu Police Department SWAT Team. He was often at loggerheads with McGarrett over what he felt was Five-0's tendency to be trigger-happy with armed suspects and refusal to obey a "wait for SWAT" order, to the point where he lodges an official complaint with Governor Denning. The Governor dismissed Grover's complaint and then promptly orders the duo on an assignment to serve a warrant for a computer hacker. By the latter half of Season 4, he is fully accepted into the Five-0 ohana. In the season 4 finale, Grover's actions to rescue his daughter result in forced early retirement from HPD, but also allows McGarrett to recruit him to be part of the Five-0 team, which he accepts. The character was named after a Captain Grover (Scott Brady) from the original series.

A 25-year veteran of the force, Grover graduated from the Chicago Police Academy in 1989, and was promptly recruited by the FBI to go undercover in the Philadelphia Black Mafia. Upon the completion of the assignment, he returned to the Chicago Police Department. He left Chicago around 2012 or 2013, after an incident where he blames himself for having failed to save a boy who was taken hostage by his father, which ultimately resulted in a murder-suicide.

He and his wife Renée (portrayed by Michelle Hurd) have two adolescent children: daughter Samantha (portrayed by Paige Hurd) and son Will (portrayed by Chosen Jacobs). The Grovers are a close-knit family and Lou is shown to be a doting father who is fair but firm with his children. As Danny also has a daughter, Grover sometimes gives him tips and unsolicited advice on dealing with preteens. Although he loves his wife and vice versa, he has a tendency to forget important dates such as birthdays, anniversaries and Valentine's Day. In season 6, he forgets about Valentine's Day and hastily makes plans but Renée saw through it and he ends up in the doghouse as a result. The Grovers live in the Honolulu neighborhood of Manoa.

Despite Grover's rocky introduction to the Five-0 team, he has since become a valued member of the team. He has an ongoing good-natured rivalry with McGarrett. McGarrett would light-heartedly joke about Grover being a "city boy" out of his element on a tropical island while Grover would poke fun about McGarrett getting himself into trouble because of his refusal to ask for help. Unlike McGarrett, Danny Williams took longer to accept Grover but they bond over the fact that they are the only members of the team with children and would often vent their frustrations to one another about parenting issues. Their friendship becomes slightly awkward after both discover that Will and Grace had been dating behind their backs.

Grover's weapon of choice is the Kimber Warrior.

=== Jerry Ortega ===
Jerry Ortega
- First appearance: "Kaʻoia iʻo Ma Loko" / "The Truth Within" (episode 4.03), (Guest Star) "Aʻohe Kahi e Peʻe Ai" / "Nowhere to Hide" (episode 5.01), (Series Regular)
- Last appearance: "Ua 'eha Ka 'ili I Ka Maka O Ka Ihe" / "The Skin has Been Hurt by the Point of the Spear" (episode 10.01)
- Portrayed by: Jorge Garcia
- Other appearances: MacGyver

In-universe information
- Title: Special Consultant
- Occupation: Five-0 Task Force
- Family: Unnamed father (deceased); Unnamed mother Isabel Ortega (younger sister)

Jerry Ortega is a conspiracy theorist who lives in his mother's basement (until she moves to Maui) who regularly assists the Five-0 Task Force with various cases. He was first introduced in the episode "Ka 'oia'i'o ma loko / The Truth Within". Jerry was classmates with Chin Ho Kelly at Kukui High and they were in the school band. A running gag in the show is the fact that he is either resistant or reluctant to use cellular technology to communicate with McGarrett (for example he once used a rotary phone to directly call McGarrett about updates for a case) and tends to ramble about conspiracies over everything. The Five-0 team largely tolerate and humor him as more often than not, his conspiracy theorist ramblings provide the team with a lead or valuable insight into a case. After much pestering, in season 6, McGarrett finally lets Jerry have his own "office"—an empty file storage room in the basement—and officially hires him as a "consultant".

Jerry is a fan of Elvis Presley, which was discovered when Five-0 was called to investigate a murder of an Elvis impersonator in the episode "Ua heleleʻi ka hoku / Fallen Star". In the same episode he shows off his musical talent by singing at the open mic when hanging out with the team for drinks after the case. While his job officially is a consultant, he operates behind the scenes as a technical operator, often providing information about the cases Five-0 investigates or technical support when they are in the field. In the episode 'Ua Malo'o Ka Wai', Jerry is awarded his very own Five-0 badge after he coordinates with Duke Lukela and HPD to rescue Five-0 from the Yakuza.

In the season 10 premiere, it is revealed that Jerry had been shot, continuing the cliffhanger left in the Season 9 finale. Two weeks later while recovering in a hospital, Jerry begins thinking about moving on to other things after his near death experience. After helping Five-0 with a new case, Jerry ultimately decides to move on from Five-0 and write a book that he no longer wished to put off until it was “too late”.

Despite the fact that he no longer appears on the series, the producers have confirmed that he will be appearing in an episode of MacGyver.

=== Tani Rey ===
Tani Rey
- First appearance: "A'ole e 'olelo mai ana ke ahi ua ana ia" / "Fire Will Never Say that It Has Had Enough" (episode 8.01)
- Last appearance: "Aloha" / "Goodbye" (episode 10.22)
- Portrayed by: Meaghan Rath
- Other appearances: Magnum P.I.

In-universe information
- Title: Officer
- Occupation: Police academy recruit (former), Lifeguard (no longer), Five-0 Task Force
- Significant other: Junior Reigns (boyfriend)
- Relatives: Koa Rey (brother)

Tani Rey was first introduced in the season 8 premiere as a lifeguard who was kicked out of the police academy for cheating. Steve asks her to go undercover to assist Five-0 on a case. She originally turned him down. However, she later changed her mind and eventually became an officer on the Five-0 Task Force. It was revealed that she has a delinquent brother named Koa and Tani repeatedly bails him out of trouble, including saving him from an HPD raid moments before he would've been arrested. Despite her best efforts to help him, Koa ends up overdosing and would have died if Adam and Noelani had not intervened. He is sent to rehab to get cleaned up, but decided to stay to work as a counselor. She and Junior Reigns became a couple in Season 10 episode 17.

=== Kamekona Tupuola ===
Kamekona Tupuola
- First appearance: Pilot (episode 1.01), (Guest Star) "A'ole e 'olelo mai ana ke ahi ua ana ia" / "Fire Will Never Say that It Has Had Enough" (episode 8.01), (Series Regular)
- Last appearance: "E ho'i na keiki oki uaua o na pali" / "Home go the very tough lads of the hills" (episode 10.19)
- Portrayed by: Taylor Wily (Jovan Armand as a teenager)
- Other appearances: MacGyver; Magnum P.I.

In-universe information
- Title: Owner
- Occupation: Waiola Shave Ice; Kamekona's Shrimp Truck; Kamekona's Helicopter Tours
- Family: Maya Tupuola (Mother); Kanoa Tupuola (Brother)
- Relatives: Flippa Tupuola (Cousin); Thomas Hoapili (Cousin); Maggie Hoapili (Niece)

Kamekona Tupuola is the owner of Waiola Shave Ice, Kamekona's Shrimp Truck and Kamekona's Helicopter Tours. Kamekona comes from a typically large Polynesian family and often mentions various relatives whenever one of the members of Five-0 needs a favor, whether for a personal matter or for an investigation. His late cousin, Thomas Hoapili, was a master of Kapu Kuʻialua, an ancient Hawaiian martial art, as is Thomas's daughter, Maggie (portrayed by Summer Glau). Another cousin, Flippa (Shawn Mokuahi Garnett), often helps Kamekona at the shrimp truck.

Kamekona was introduced in the Pilot as Chin's confidential informant and owner of a shave ice stall on the beach. His full background and how he first met Chin were only revealed in the season 6 episode "Kuleana / One's Personal Sense of Responsibility". As the elder son in an impoverished family, he would skip school to earn extra money to help his single mother. He gradually became a drug kingpin and did some time at Halawa. As a result of his younger brother's involvement with a noted drug dealer, whom Chin Ho Kelly was coincidentally investigating, he agreed to be a CI for the HPD on the condition his brother is let go without any charges. Chin visits Kamekona in prison and gives him Napoleon Hill's book Think and Grow Rich, beginning a friendship that continues to the formation of Five-0. He started his shave ice stand while getting back on his feet after being released. In the season 5 finale, he mentioned that his shrimp truck business is now in doubt, after Steve and Danny dropped a nuke into the sea to prevent it from blowing up on land. In season 3 he qualifies as a helicopter pilot with the help of McGarrett. Members of the Five-0 Task Force and their families are often seen patronizing his shrimp truck or asking him for favors (e.g. he babysat Grace Williams, Danny's daughter, and chaperoned Steve's sister Mary while they were at work).

=== Duke Lukela ===
Duke Lukela
- First appearance: "Hana 'a'a Makehewa" / "Neighbor" (episode 1.12), (Guest Star) "A'ole e 'olelo mai ana ke ahi ua ana ia" / "Fire Will Never Say that It Has Had Enough" (episode 8.01), (Series Regular)
- Last appearance: "He puhe'e miki" / "A gripping cuttlefish" (episode 10.20)
- Portrayed by: Dennis Chun
- Other appearances: Magnum P.I.

In-universe information
- Title: Sergeant
- Occupation: HPD
- Spouse: Nalani

Sergeant Duke Lukela is a veteran HPD officer who often acts as a liaison to Five-0. He was one of the few HPD cops who was not antagonistic towards Danny or the other Five-0 members from the beginning, as he was colleagues with Steve's father and many of Chin and Kono's family members (they come from a family of cops) and had known the three of them since they were children. In "Hookman", he was shot by Curt Stoner (Peter Weller), but survived and recovered. He is married to Nalani (portrayed by Chun's real-life partner Laura Mellow.) They have a granddaughter.

Chun is the son of Kam Fong Chun, who played Chin Ho Kelly on the original Hawaii Five-O. The character Duke Lukela was portrayed by Herman Wedemeyer in the original series. Chun himself also played various minor characters throughout the original series.

=== Noelani Cunha ===
Noelani Cunha
- First appearance: "Makaukau 'oe e Pa'ani?" / "Ready to Play?" (episode 7.01), (guest star) "A'ole e 'olelo mai ana ke ahi ua ana ia" / "Fire Will Never Say that It Has Had Enough" (episode 8.01), (series regular)
- Last appearance: "Aloha" / "Goodbye" (episode 10.22)
- Portrayed by: Kimee Balmilero
- Other appearances: Magnum P.I.

In-universe information
- Title: Doctor
- Occupation: Medical examiner

Noelani was first introduced in season 7 working with Dr. Max Bergman as a medical examiner. Following his departure in season 7 Noelani took his place. She also appeared in numerous episodes of Magnum PI, reluctantly helping the titular character in some of his cases.

=== Junior Reigns ===
Junior Reigns
- First appearance: "Na La 'Ilio" / "Dog Days" (episode 8.02), (series regular)
- Last appearance: "Aloha" / "Goodbye" (episode 10.22)
- Portrayed by: Beulah Koale
- Other appearances: Magnum P.I.

In-universe information
- Title: Officer
- Occupation: Five-0 Task Force; USNR; United States Navy (former)
- Family: Lana Reigns (mom); Natano Reigns (father); Maya Reigns (sister, deceased)
- Significant others: Layla (ex-girlfriend); Tani Rey (girlfriend)

Junior Reigns was first introduced in the second episode of season 8. Junior came to Steve looking for a job on the Task Force immediately after being discharged from the U.S. Navy. Steve initially turned him down. However, after Junior insists, Steve tells him that before becoming a part of Five-0 he must train at the police academy. Junior eventually receives his badge and joins Five-0.

Unlike the other members, Junior rarely questions Steve's tactics or methods due to their shared military background as Navy SEALs and has occasionally had to explain to Danny Williams and Lou Grover the rationale behind Steve's actions. Other characters have noted similarities between Steve (when he first started Five-0) and Junior, in particular Junior's instructor at the HPD Academy.

In season 8, it is revealed that Junior had been putting up at a homeless shelter despite having family on the island (Steve later finds out and asks him to move in with him until he finds an apartment). Throughout season 9, it is gradually revealed that he has avoided going home as he was estranged from his father and they only communicated through his mother. It has been implied that Junior had grown up in a loving and stable home, unlike some of his peers at school who mixed with the wrong crowd. Junior had initially planned to return to marry his high school sweetheart Layla after a tour but re-enlisted without consulting her, leading to them breaking up. He left the Navy with the rank of Special Warfare Operator 2nd class.

Junior had a sister Maya, who was killed in a car accident when he was young, and their father never fully got over it, leading to him vehemently opposing his only remaining child enlisting in the Navy. However Junior went against him and followed his footsteps into the military and it deepened their estrangement to the point where they were no longer on speaking terms for years. When he returned stateside, he attempted to make amends with his father. Their relationship hits a rough patch when Junior decides forgive the man who was driving the car that killed Maya and his grief-stricken father disowns him in the season 9 finale as a result. In season 10 he reaches out to his father again after discovering that his father had actually been regularly communicating with his CO while he was deployed in Afghanistan. At the end of the episode, they reconcile and Junior brings his parents to Steve's Thanksgiving barbecue. He and Tani Rey became a couple in Season 10 episode 17.

==== Awards and decorations ====
The following are the awards and decorations worn on SO2 Reigns' Class-A uniform, as seen in "A'ohe Kio Pohaku Nalo i Ke Alo Pali".

Personal decorations
Purple Heart
Navy & Marine Corps Commendation Medal, w/“V” device
Service awards
Navy Good Conduct Medal
Campaign and service medals
National Defense Service Medal
Afghanistan Campaign Medal, w/2 bronze service stars (3rd award)
Global War on Terrorism Service Medal
Service and training awards
Sea Service Deployment Ribbon
Foreign awards
NATO Medal
Marksmanship awards
Navy Expert Rifleman Medal
Navy Pistol Marksmanship Ribbon

Other accoutrements
Special Warfare insignia
Naval Parachutist insignia
1 Service Stripe (reflecting 4 years of service)

=== Adam Noshimuri ===
Adam Noshimuri
- First appearance: "Pahele" / "Trap" (episode 2.11), (Guest Star) "Kau Ka ‘Onohi Ali’i I Luna" / "The Royal Eyes Rest Above" (episode 8.07), (series regular)
- Last appearance: "Aloha" / "Goodbye" (episode 10.22)
- Portrayed by: Ian Anthony Dale
- Other appearances: Magnum P.I.

In-universe information
- Title(s): Officer; Confidential Informant (former)
- Occupation: Five-0 Task Force; Head of Five-0 Task Force Special Division of Organized Crime (former); Former head of the Japanese Yakuza (former)
- Family: Hiro Noshimuri (father) (deceased); Michael Noshimuri (brother) (deceased); Noriko Noshimuri (half-sister) (deceased)
- Spouse: Kono Kalakaua (ex-wife)
- Significant other: Tamiko (girlfriend)

Adam Noshimuri, Kono's husband who becomes a new head of the Japanese Yakuza after Wo Fat murders his father, Hiro. First introduced in the season 2 episode "Pahele / Trap", he has been trying to legitimize and clean up his organization with the intention of distancing himself from his father's criminal past. When he and Kono first started dating, the Five-0 team were extremely suspicious of him, particularly Steve and Chin – the former due to his father's history with the yakuza and the latter due to him seeing Kono as a younger sister. He is accepted into the Five-0 ohana after proving his love for Kono. After Adam kills his brother Michael (Daniel Henney) to protect Kono, he and Kono leave Hawaii and go into hiding. He comes out of hiding after his brother's loyalists are no longer a threat. At the beginning of Season 5, Adam proposes to Kono and at the end of this season they marry. In "Mai ho`oni i ka wai lana mālie", Adam is shot by Gabriel Waincroft, who runs away with the money that Adam would use to distance himself from the Yakuza. Almost immediately after Adam killed two Yakuza thugs in "Piko Pau 'iole" to save himself and Kono, Gabriel buys off Adam's debt in order for his cartel to team up with the head of the Hawaiian Yakuza. He subsequently turns himself in to the Honolulu Police Department. After a short legal battle he is sentenced to 18 months in prison, which was agreed on since he had been acting in self-defense. He has been released on parole as of the season 7 episode "Ka 'Aelike / The Deal".

Adam is the elder son of Hiro Noshimuri and, with the introduction of Adam's brother Michael, it becomes apparent that Adam was the brains who ran the legitimate business front of their father's operation out of New York while Michael was the brawn who usually took care of the "dirty" side. For example, when the Five-0 team uncover a yakuza burial site, it is revealed that he knew nothing about it. He is implied to be a Nisei (first generation American-born Japanese American) and his grandfather served in the Imperial Japanese Navy.

Dale was initially confirmed for a four-episode arc but following positive fan response, became a recurring guest star. His character had been written as a potential antagonist for McGarrett and the team as he saw the latter as a stumbling block in his quest for answers about his father's death. Like his character, Dale is of Japanese descent.

In the season 8 episode I Ka Wa Ma Mua, I Ka Wa Ma Hope (The Future is in the Past) Danny dreams of the future and Adam has a child with Kono. In the Season 8 episode Ka Hopu Nui 'Ana (The Round Up), after a devastating hit on Hawaii's crime bosses by a new crime syndicate, Steve asks Adam to head up a new special division within the Five-0 Task Force to focus specifically on organized crime. Through his investigation, he discovers he has a half-sister, Noriko, who tries to manipulate him by threatening Kono, Chin, Abby and Sarah. However, Adam ends up leaving the island after his informant, Jessie, is killed, but, at the same time, Noriko is killed. In the season 8 finale, Tani discovers a gun in Adam's house, leading her to believe Adam may have been responsible for Noriko's murder.

In the season 9 episode, "A'ohe Mea 'Imi A Ka Maka", Tani tests the gun's ballistics and confirm it was the murder weapon. In "Aia I Hi'Ikua; I Hi'Ialo", Adam returns home, depressed by his break-up with Kono. However, Danny helps him through his pain and as a thank you for everything he has done, he offers Adam a spot on Five-0 which he accepts. After HPD got an anonymous tip about Adam's gun but was unable to find it, he confronts Tani about it, but she reveals she did not call it in after Adam helped save her brother's life, leading them both to discover a third party is trying to frame him.

=== Quinn Liu ===
Quinn Liu
- First appearance: "Ua eh ka ili I ka maka o ka Ihe" / "The skin has been hurt by the point of the spear" (episode 10.01), (series regular)
- Last appearance: "Aloha" / "Goodbye" (episode 10.22)
- Portrayed by: Katrina Law

In-universe information
- Title(s): Officer; Sergeant (former)
- Occupation: Five-0 task force member Former Army CID Staff Sergeant
- Family: Brian (brother; deceased)
- Spouse: Jake (ex-husband)
- Relatives: Olivia (step-daughter)

Quinn Liu first appears as a staff sergeant in the CID who was recently demoted for insubordination the season 10 premiere.

== Recurring ==
Name	Portrayed by	Seasons									
Name	Portrayed by	1	2	3	4	5	6	7	8	9	10
Pat Jameson	Jean Smart	Recurring									
Grace Williams	Teilor Grubbs	Recurring								Guest	
Sang Min	Will Yun Lee	Recurring	Guest			Guest					
Rachel Edwards	Claire van der Boom	Recurring	Guest			Guest		Guest (Note: Credited as Rachel Hollander beginning with the sixth season.)			
Wo Fat	Mark Dacascos	Recurring			Guest					Guest	
Laura Hills	Kelly Hu	Recurring									
Jenna Kaye	Larisa Oleynik	Recurring				Guest					
Victor Hesse	James Marsters	Guest				Guest					Guest
Malia Waincroft	Reiko Aylesworth	Guest	Recurring	Guest							
Charlie Fong	Brian Yang	Guest	Recurring			Guest					
John McGarrett	William Sadler	Guest							Guest (Note: Portrayed by Ryan Bittle in the eighth and ninth seasons.)		Guest
Mamo Kahike	Al Harrington	Guest			Guest					Guest	
Kawika	Kala Alexander	Guest									
Adam "Toast" Charles	Martin Starr	Guest		Guest			Guest				
Sam Denning	Richard T. Jones		Recurring	Guest							
Joe White	Terry O'Quinn		Recurring	Guest					Guest		
Gabrielle Asano	Autumn Reeser		Recurring	Guest							
Vincent Fryer	Tom Sizemore		Recurring								
Frank Delano	William Baldwin		Recurring	Guest							
Wade Gutches	David Keith		Guest							Guest	
Doris McGarrett	Christine Lahti			Recurring				Guest			Guest
Michael Noshimuri	Daniel Henney			Recurring							
Flippa	Shawn Mokuahi-Garnett			Recurring							
Duane "Dog" Chapman				Guest							
Pua Kai	Shawn Thomsen			Guest		Recurring	Guest	Recurring	Guest	Recurring	
Billy Harrington	Justin Bruening			Guest	Recurring						
Eric Russo	Andrew Lawrence			Guest			Recurring			Guest	
Paul Delano	Daniel Baldwin			Guest		Guest					
Samantha Grover	Paige Hurd				Recurring	Guest					
Clara Williams	Melanie Griffith				Recurring		Guest				
Gabriel Waincroft	Christopher Sean				Guest	Recurring					
Melissa Armstrong (Note: Initially introduced and credited as Amber Vitale in early appearances.)	Lili Simmons				Guest						
Mindy Shaw	Amanda Setton					Recurring					
Ellie Clayton	Mirrah Foulkes					Recurring					
Jason Duclair	Randy Couture					Guest			Guest		
Gerard Hirsch	Willie Garson					Guest	Recurring	Guest			
Odell Martin	Michael Imperioli					Guest			Guest		
Nahele Huikala	Keoka Kekumano					Guest	Recurring	Guest	Recurring	Guest	
Charlie Williams	Zach Sulzback					Guest		Recurring	Guest	Recurring	Guest
Ricky Schiff	Charlie Saxton					Guest				Guest	
Abby Dunn	Julie Benz						Recurring	Guest			
Lynn Downey	Sarah Carter						Guest				
Sarah Waincroft Diaz	Londyn Silzer						Guest	Recurring			
Will Grover	Chosen Jacobs						Guest	Recurring	Guest		
Nalani Lukela	Laura Mellow						Guest			Guest	
Alicia Brown	Claire Forlani							Recurring			
Madison Gray	Elisabeth Röhm							Recurring			
Koa Rey	Kunal Sharma								Recurring	Guest	
Jessie Nomura	Christine Ko								Recurring		
Aaron Wright	Joey Lawrence								Guest		
Greer	Rochelle Aytes									Recurring	
Hajime Masuda	Sonny Saito									Guest	
Tamiko Masuda	Brittany Ishibashi									Guest	
Fernando Chien	Kenji Higashi										Recurring

=== Family members ===
==== John McGarrett ====
Portrayed by William Sadler and Ryan Bittle

Sergeant John McGarrett, HPD (Ret.) (1942–2010) is the father of Steve and Mary Ann McGarrett and (presumed) widower of Doris McGarrett. His own father, Ensign Steve McGarrett, was killed in action on the U.S.S. Arizona (BB-39) during the attack on Pearl Harbor and John was born three months later on March 15. John would follow in his father's footsteps into the navy, serving in the Vietnam War and reaching the rank of Lieutenant before becoming a Honolulu Police Department detective. After Doris' presumed death, he launched his own investigation and sent Steve, then a high school junior, to board at the Army and Navy Academy in Carlsbad, California, and Mary to live with his older sister Deb, who lived several hours away from Steve's new school, for their safety. It is presumed that this was the last time the siblings ever saw him in person as they became estranged from their father for sending them away; Steve only learns the real reason why his father divided the family when he returns to Hawaii to head the new task force following John's murder. In light of the revelation, Steve and Mary were able to let go of their animosity and are often seen visiting his grave site.

John has been mentioned a number of times as Steve regularly works with HPD officers, many of whom were John's former colleagues, and is implied to have been a much respected figure within the police force. Even renowned diamond smuggler and fence August March (Ed Asner) paid tribute to John's sense of integrity by telling Steve about how John turned down his $100,000 bribe over three decades ago.

John McGarrett was murdered by Victor Hesse on September 20, 2010, as witnessed by Steve, who was overseas on a highly classified mission in South Korea, via satellite phone. He was buried at the National Cemetery of the Pacific with full military honors. In the 100th episode "Ina Paha" ("If Perhaps") he is never murdered by Hesse and is able to reconnect with Steve when he returns home.

==== Doris McGarrett ====
Portrayed by Christine Lahti

Doris McGarrett is the wife of the late John McGarrett and mother of Steve and Mary Ann McGarrett. She was presumably murdered by a car bomb when Steve was aged fifteen or sixteen. It is revealed in Season 3 that she was a former CIA operative who went by the alias "Shelburne" and had faked her own death as a cover to escape underground in order to protect her family.

In the Season 3 premiere, Joe White brings Steve to Suruga Bay in Japan where mother and son are reunited. Steve was hostile to his mother, even refusing to call her "Mom", due to the years of resentment over how the family was torn apart by her supposed death and watching his father grieve over her. Mary also initially refused to see her after learning the truth from Steve. For the rest of the season she constantly refuses to tell everything to Steve and he does not fully trust her. He sends Cath to "babysit" her at a safehouse but Wo Fat bypasses the security system and Cath into the house to confront Doris. Despite being a crack shot and armed, ballistic evidence showed that she had intentionally shot away from him, which she attributed to her nerves and shock over Wo Fat's sudden appearance, but Steve refuses to believe her story. In the third-season finale she leaves Hawaii with Kono and Adam to help them evade the Yakuza with her promising to Steve that her story is "To be continued.". Over the next two seasons, bits and pieces (and rumors) of Doris' connection to Wo Fat are revealed. Steve only learns the full truth after he was abducted and tortured by Wo Fat in the 100th episode. She is mentioned in the episode "Pono Kaulike / Justice for All" where she uses her contacts to keep her son safe from a rogue CIA agent who attempts to have Danny and Chin framed to cover his tracks. Steve was able to use the information she provided to Joe White to exonerate his co-workers. In the seventh seasons 150th episode Steve learns from Catherine that she was captured after attempting to break Wo Fat's father out of prison. Steve and Catherine along with the rest of the team (excluding Danny) go to Morocco to break her and Wo Fat's father out. Later Doris is seen again in Season 10 Episode 7 where she is reunited briefly with Steve for a little before she is stabbed and dies.

==== Aunt Deb ====
Portrayed by Carol Burnett

Debra "Deb" McGarrett is the late older sister of John McGarrett and aunt of Steve and Mary Ann McGarrett. She raised Mary when John had sent the kids away from Hawaii for their safety after Doris was presumed to be murdered by a car bomb. Steve and Mary both see her as a maternal figure and she, having never married or had children, treats them as her own. Deb had been a struggling singer on the cusp of a big break when she left a promising career to raise Mary. In season 4, she pays Steve a surprise visit for Thanksgiving and reveals that she has stage four cancer. In season 5, she agrees to go for chemotherapy and her brain tumor has shrunk. She marries Leonard Cassano (Frankie Valli), a retired defense lawyer with stage four leukemia whom met during chemo. In the episode "Ua Ola Loko I Ke Aloha / Love Gives Life Within" she returns to Hawaii with Leonard's ashes on the pretext of spending time with Steve, Mary, and Joan, but does not tell them that she was actually dying and trying to complete her bucket list. She passes away peacefully in Steve and Mary's childhood home (which Steve has lived in since his father's death) after fulfilling all but one thing on her bucket list—climb a tall mountain. Steve and Mary complete her list by scattering her ashes on the mountain top.

==== Grace Williams ====
Grace Williams
- First appearance: "Pilot" episode 1.01,(recurring role)
- Portrayed by: Teilor Grubbs

In-universe information
- Nicknames: Gracie (by Steve); Monkey (by Danny)
- Family: Danny Williams (father); Rachel Hollander (mother); Charlie Williams (brother)
- Significant other: Will Grover
- Relatives: Eric Williams Russo (paternal cousin); Steve McGarrett (surrogate uncle); Eddie Williams (grandfather); Clara Williams (grandmother); Matt Williams (paternal uncle) (deceased); Stella Williams-Russo (paternal aunt); Bridget Williams (paternal aunt); Amanda Savage (maternal grandmother); Stan Edwards (former stepfather)

Grace Williams is the daughter of Danny Williams and Rachel Edwards. Her parents divorced in the timeline before the pilot and she moved to Hawaii with her mother and millionaire new stepfather. She attends the Academy of the Sacred Heart, a fictional private school, and participates in the cheerleading team. She calls her father "Danno" and is the only person he unconditionally allows to call him that. Grace is named after a former partner of her father's who was killed in the line of duty by a criminal.

Grace is well-liked by the rest of the Five-0 ohana. She took to "Uncle Steve", as she calls McGarrett, who affectionately calls her "Gracie". Whenever Danny was unavailable due to extenuating circumstances, McGarrett would be the one to pick her up from school or personally reassure her.

Grace was often the source of Danny's disputes with his ex-wife over his visitation rights. Rachel would use their daughter as leverage and make empty threats about rescinding or lessening his visitation days. Eventually, Danny takes the matter to court and is awarded joint custody, meaning that Grace cannot move away from Hawaii without Danny's approval.

As of season 7 Grace is dating Will Grover, Lou's son. In the season 8 episode "I Ka Wa Ma Mua, I Ka Wa Ma Hope" ("The Future is in the Past") Grace is shown as an adult marrying Will.

==== Charlie Williams ====
Charlie Williams
- First appearance: "Pu'olo"/The Package"(recurring role)
- Portrayed by: Zach Sulzbach

In-universe information
- Family: Rachel Hollander (mother); Danny Williams (father); Grace Williams (sister)

Charlie is the second child of Danny and Rachel. Charlie was originally thought to be the son of Stan however it was revealed in season 5 that Danny is the true father. In the season 8 episode I Ka Wa Ma Mua, I Ka Wa Ma Hope (The Future is in the Past) Charlie is an adult and has become a member of the Honolulu Police Department. He is then offered a job by Tani Rey, the now leader of the Five-0 Task Force.

==== Will Grover ====
Will Grover
- First appearance: "Malama Ka Po'e"/"Care For One's People"(recurring role)
- Portrayed by: Chosen Jacobs

In-universe information
- Family: Lou Grover (father); Renee Grover (mother); Samantha Grover (elder sister)
- Significant other: Grace Williams (girlfriend)

Will Grover is the son of Lou Grover. Although not seen until season 6 he moved to Hawaii with his father, mother, and sister. He attends Academy of the Sacred Heart with Grace Williams. Will and Grace are often seen spending time together doing activities such as homework, eating breakfast, and dancing. As of season 7 Will is dating Grace. In the season 8 episode I Ka Wa Ma Mua, I Ka Wa Ma Hope (The Future is in the Past) an adult Will is marrying Grace.

==== Rachel Edwards/Hollander ====
Portrayed by Claire van der Boom

Danny's ex-wife and mother of Grace and Charlie. She moves to Hawaii after marrying millionaire Stan Edwards. Early in Season 1, she and Danny are often seen bitterly arguing on the phone to the point where the whole team knew about the feud even before they had met Rachel or Grace in person. She often used Grace as leverage and threatened to further limit his visitation rights when his job prevented him from being punctual to their father-daughter dates but Danny successfully files for joint custody, meaning that Grace cannot leave Hawaii without his consent. They are now on friendly terms, particularly after her marriage with Stan hits a rocky patch and Danny was there to help with Charlie's birth (which he later discovers was actually his, not Stan's). In the seventh season of the series Rachel divorces Stan and takes her maiden name once again.

Later in seasons 8 and 9, Rachel and Danny reconcile. In season 10, Danny says reconciliation did not go well.

==== Malia Waincroft ====
Portrayed by Reiko Aylesworth

Chin's wife, Dr. Malia Waincroft was previously engaged to Chin before he broke up with her after losing his badge. The two reconnected after he joined Five-0, and then resumed their relationship. She marries Kelly in the episode "Alaheo Pauʻole / Gone Forever", but dies in "La O Na Makuahine", the third-season premiere episode, from injuries sustained after she was shot, leaving Chin devastated. She had a brother named Gabriel Waincroft who was revealed to be responsible for the murder of Chin's father 15 years earlier.

==== Lynn Downey ====
Lynn Downey
- First appearance: "Na Kama Hele"/" Day Trippers " episode 6.07 (recurring role)
- Last appearance: "Poniu l ke Aloha"/Crazy In Love" episode 7.17 (guest star)
- Portrayed by: Sarah Carter

In-universe information
- Significant other: Steve McGarrett (ex-boyfriend)

Lynn Downey is seen dating Steve McGarrett in season 6 and season 7. They are presumedly still together through season 8, as per comments early in the season. The cause of their break up is not known nor is it made clear when it happened.

=== Other ===
==== Jenna Kaye ====
Portrayed by Larisa Oleynik

Jenna Kaye is an ex-CIA analyst, assistant to Five-0. She is later revealed to be an associate of Wo Fat. At the end of "Ha'i'ole", she is seen driving Wo Fat away from the prison after he murdered Victor Hesse. She leaves Five-0 to follow up on a lead that her fiancé, Josh, who she claimed had been killed by Wo Fat, might in fact be alive and asks Steve to go with her to North Korea to get him. It turns out to be a trap for McGarrett, from Wo Fat telling Jenna he would release Josh if she brought him McGarrett, explaining her association with him. Jenna later discovers that Josh had been dead the entire time and that it was also a trap for her. She is able to tell McGarrett she is sorry for setting him up and gives him a pin from Josh's knee repair to help him escape, moments before Wo Fat shoots and kills her. In the 100th episode she is seen in the same episode that Victor Hesse is in looking for her fiancé who was in a motorcycle accident.

==== Detective Abby Dunn ====
Portrayed by Julie Benz

Abby Dunn is a Detective for the HPD and is the girlfriend of Chin Ho Kelly. She held the rank of Inspector at the San Francisco Police Department and was temporarily assigned to the Five-0 task force as SFPD intended to start a similar task force. However, it is revealed that she had been forced by an FBI agent with a grudge against Five-0 to tail them and find a reason to shut the task force down. She discloses this information to Chin after starting a relationship with him and resigns from the SFPD as well as Five-0, transferring to the HPD to become a detective.

==== Governor Pat Jameson ====
Portrayed by Jean Smart

Pat Jameson was the Governor of Hawaii in Season 1. When Steve McGarrett returned home to Hawaii to bury his father, who was murdered by arms dealer Victor Hesse, she requests him to set up a task force with "full immunity and means" to apprehend criminals such as Hesse. McGarrett flatly turns her down as he felt she only asked him to do so for political reasons and boost her ratings. Once he realizes he had no jurisdiction over the investigation, he quickly accepts the job and sets the "Governor's Task Force", which came to be called "Five-0".

Over the course of season 1 it is revealed that Governor Jameson was actually colluding with Wo Fat and other criminals such as Adam's father Hiro. In the season 1 finale it is revealed that she was responsible for the murder of Laura Hills. McGarrett confronts her about it in her office and records her confession on his phone. Wo Fat sneaks in, tasers McGarrett and then shoots and kills the governor after she deletes the recording. Wo Fat attempts to frame McGarrett for the murder by placing the murder weapon in his hand.

==== Laura Hills ====
Portrayed by Kelly Hu

Laura Hills, Gov. Jameson's public safety liaison. In the season 1 finale it is revealed that she was sending McGarett evidence from his "Champ" box. She is killed in a car bomb by Wo Fat and Jameson. McGarrett is also framed for her murder after his fingerprints were found in her house.

==== Michael Noshimuri ====
Portrayed by Daniel Henney

Michael Noshimuri is Adam's brother who was released from prison during season three, and appears apprehensive about any plans to remake the Yakuza. He attempted to frame Kono for a murder he committed using her gun. In the season three finale, he attempts to kill his brother Adam and Adam's girlfriend Kono, but Adam kills him in self-defense.

==== Joe White ====
Portrayed by Terry O'Quinn

Lieutenant Commander Joe White, USN (Ret.) (born July 9, 1954) was Steve McGarrett's former SEAL trainer and a long-time friend of John McGarrett and mentor to Steve. A Wisconsin native, he is a "mustang", having been a master chief petty officer before gaining a commission and retiring as a lieutenant commander. He appears to be well known amongst SEALs from his time as a trainer at the Naval Special Warfare Center, as McGarrett's former SEAL teammate Billy Harrington and SO2 Graham Wilson, who was a person of interest in the episode "Hoʻapono", both knew of him. In the season 2 episode "Kiʻilua / Deceiver", he is forced into retirement after leading an unsanctioned mission into North Korea to rescue McGarrett.

White was one of the few people who knew about Shelburne but he refused to disclose it to McGarrett as he knew it would only hurt him even more emotionally. He would repeatedly give excuses or evade McGarrett's persistent questions about the true identity of Shelburne. As a result, McGarrett, despite seeing him as a father figure, regards him with some distrust.

Joe was killed in season 9, because of Greer's treason (Steve's ex lover).

==== Mamo Kahike ====
Portrayed by Al Harrington

Mamo owns a surf rental shop at Waikiki Beach. During the off season he works as a bus driver. A long-time friend of McGarrett's father and Chin and Kono's family, he taught Steve, Mary, and Kono how to surf as children and is seen as a fatherly figure by them. He is also a history enthusiast and participates in historical reenactments of Ancient Hawaiian society.

Al Harrington is one of several actors who appeared on the original series. He had a recurring role as Detective Ben Kokua.

==== Governor Sam Denning ====
Portrayed by Richard T. Jones

Governor Samuel "Sam" Denning was Lieutenant Governor of Hawaii, replacing Gov. Jameson after her death. He is much more "by the book" and withdraws his predecessor's assurance to the Five-0 Task Force of "full immunity and means". Instead, he brings in former federal agent Lori Weston as a "spy" to keep McGarrett and the rest of Five-0 in line, much to their displeasure. In season 3 he and McGarrett come to a mutual agreement to be open with one another about investigations, with McGarrett pointing out that Governor Jameson's dishonesty was what got her killed. Although not always agreeing with McGarrett's style, Governor Denning does vouch for and backs him when necessary. For example, he dismisses Lou Grover's complaint against McGarrett in season 4 and instead forces the both of them to serve a warrant together and work out their differences themselves.

==== Nahele Huikala ====
Portrayed by Kekoa Kekumano

In the episode "Poina ʻOle / Not Forgotten", Nahele was first introduced as a homeless juvenile delinquent who stole McGarrett's prized vintage Marquis and stripped it for scrap metal. McGarrett decides not to file charges after learning that Nahele was living on the streets after running away from his temporary guardian, his negligent uncle, and that his only parent, his father, has been in prison since he was eight. Kamekona agrees to let Nahele work for him as a waiter at the shrimp truck as part of the agreement that McGarrett will not file charges if Nahele keeps his end of the bargain to stay out of trouble. Since then he has looked up to McGarrett as a mentor and an older brother figure. In season 6, his father is released from prison and successfully files for custody of him. Distraught, Nahele confesses a long-buried secret to McGarrett explaining why he still refuses to see his father even though the latter turned his life around.

==== Dr. Charles "Charlie" Fong ====
Portrayed by Brian Yang

Charlie Fong is a forensic scientist with the Honolulu Police Department Crime Lab. He provides evidence analysis for the Five-0 Task Force. He attended the prestigious Punahou School and is a childhood friend of Kono.

==== Ellie Clayton ====
Portrayed by Mirrah Foulkes

Ellie Clayton is a lawyer and Deputy District Attorney introduced in the season 5 episode "Hoʻoilina / Legacy". She emigrated from Australia with her father Paul as a child. Her father owned a bar called "Aces High" but was shot and killed in a botched robbery nineteen years ago. She was upstairs in their flat and heard the kill shot. A homeless man was prosecuted but the case eventually went cold due to the lack of credible witnesses and evidence. She graduated from law school and returned to Hawaii. In several episodes she aided the Five-0 Task Force by securing arrest warrants or providing advice.

McGarrett meets her by chance when he sees her putting flowers on his father's grave and accosts her. She reveals that John was the uniformed officer who responded to the scene of her father's murder. Every Christmas since then he would visit her and give her a present. According to Chin, John made an effort to keep in contact with her, partly out of guilt and regret for sending his two children away. Ellie reveals that prior to his death, John had called her up to tell her that he had found new evidence. McGarrett recalls finding an "Aces High" matchbook in his father's Champ toolbox and decides to reopen the case in memory of his father. Five-0 solves the case with the help of a young drug runner whom Paul had tried to help back then (unsuccessfully) and wanted to repay Paul for his kindness. Danny proposed Ellie as a potential love interest, but McGarrett quickly shoots down the idea, saying that due to her connection to his father, they could only be friends. She tries to set a reluctant McGarrett up with various women out of concern that he was too consumed with his work. McGarrett eventually begins a relationship with one of the women, Lynn.

==== Eric Russo ====
Portrayed by Andrew Lawrence

Eric Russo (born 1984 or 1985) is the nephew of Detective Danny Williams; his mother Stella is Danny's older sister. He was first introduced in the episode "Kapu / Forbidden" when Stella sends him to his "Uncle D" in hopes that Danny would be able to set him straight. He dropped out of college and was still undecided about his future. In the episode, he follows McGarrett and the team around as they solve a case involving a college professor and his students. Eric provides some valuable insights which helped solve the case. To Danny's surprise, he decides to pursue forensics and, once finishes college, joins the HPD forensics lab as an assistant.

==== Madison Gray ====
Portrayed by Elisabeth Röhm

Madison Gray is a serial killer whom Alicia Brown help captures. She later dies at the hands of Brown.

=== Minor ===
==== Commander Wade Gutches ====
Portrayed by David Keith, commanding officer of SEAL Team 9 and friend of Cmdr. White. He is stationed at Naval Station Pearl Harbor as an instructor.

==== Kawika ====
Portrayed by Kala Alexander, leader of the Kapu gang/civic pride group.

==== Clara Williams ====
Portrayed by Melanie Griffith, mother of Danny Williams. The character was brought back from the original series and was portrayed by Helen Hayes, the real-life mother of James MacArthur, who portrayed Danny Williams.

==== Eddie Williams ====
Portrayed by Tom Berenger, father of Danny Williams. A retired Newark, NJ firefighter. He appears in one episode, Ma lalo o ka 'ili, traveling to Hawaii to salvage his marriage to Clara.

==== Leilani ====
Portrayed by Lindsay Price, Chin Ho Kelly's ex-girlfriend

==== Officer Pua Kai ====
Portrayed by Shawn Anthony Thomsen, an HPD rookie cop. He is often seen teasing Kono and is on friendly terms with the Five-0 team.

==== Odell Martin ====
Portrayed by Michael Imperioli, a New York City native and former attorney with a shady past who now owns a barber shop. McGarrett befriended him and is a regular customer.

==== Cmdr. Harry Langford ====
Portrayed by Chris Vance, a suave MI-6 agent who appears in four episodes and helps the team with cases relating to the UK.

=== Criminals and antagonists ===
Main recurring characters

==== Wo Fat ====
Wo Fat
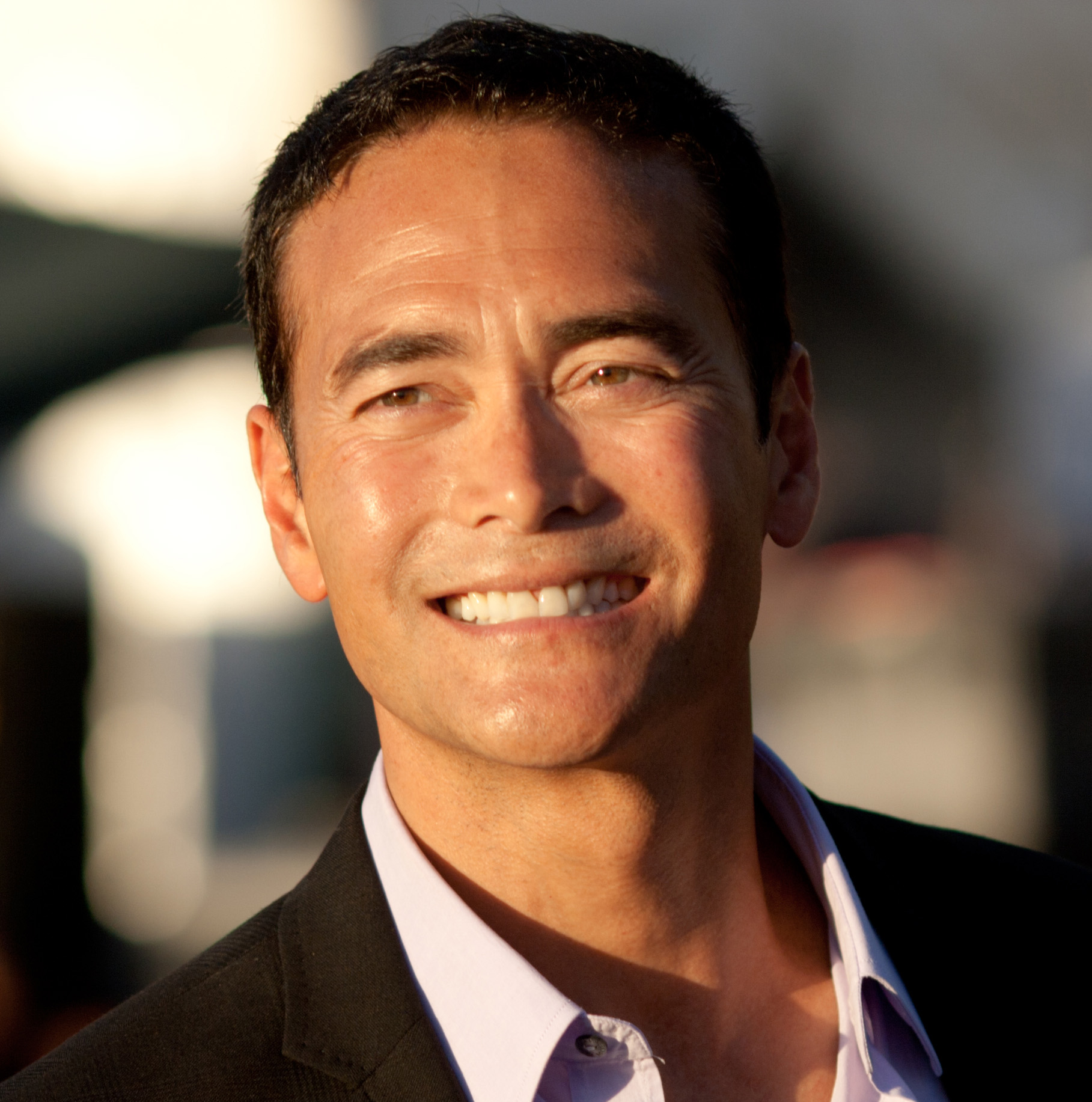
- First appearance: "Hana ʻaʻa Makehewa" (episode 1.12)
- Last appearance: "Aloha" (episode 10.22)
- Created by: Leonard Freeman; Peter M. Lenkov
- Portrayed by: Mark Dacascos

In-universe information
- Occupation: Chinese spy
- Spouse: Daiyu Mei

Wo Fat (portrayed by Mark Dacascos) is the principal antagonist and nemesis of Steve McGarrett. He is well known in the criminal world for his ruthlessness and ability to wriggle his way around the law.

Wo Fat debuted in the last scene of the first-season episode "Hana 'a'a Makehewa" on December 13, 2010. In the episode, Wo Fat pays Victor Hesse a visit in jail and asks about Steve McGarrett's (Alex O'Loughlin) pursuit of justice for his father John (William Sadler), whom Hesse killed in the pilot episode. Over the course of the season, Wo Fat attracts McGarrett's attention because of his association with local Yakuza boss Hiro Noshimuri. It is revealed that Wo Fat ordered the death of the elder McGarrett and frames Steve in the season finale for killing Governor Jameson (who was in collusion with him).

As the second season begins, Wo Fat orders Hesse to kill McGarrett behind bars and kills Hesse to prevent Five-0 from getting more answers about him. He is also in cahoots with ex–CIA analyst Jenna Kaye, whose fiancé was captured in an earlier mission to take down Wo Fat. This allows him to manipulate Kaye in getting Steve's help for a fake ransom exchange in North Korea. He kills her and disappears as Five-0 rescues Steve. It is revealed that Wo Fat is obsessed with finding and killing a person named "Shelburne", who apparently killed his father years before the series. As Wo Fat hides in Osaka, late in the season, McGarrett captures him and brings him back to Hawaii. However, both men are forced to work together in fighting off Hiro's son and successor Adam, who was seeking revenge for his father's death. McGarrett locks him up at the Halawa Correctional Facility at the end of the season.

As the third season begins, "In La O Na Makuahine", Wo Fat is on the verge of being transferred but the prison truck he is in is attacked. The truck is then transported by a helicopter and dropped into the ocean. Armed men in SCUBA cut through the truck's secure door with torches and kill the guards, resulting in Fat being freed. It is later revealed that Frank Delano is the man responsible for attacking the truck and breaking Wo Fat out. The two strike up a deal; Delano will be able to get stolen drugs off the island in exchange for giving Wo Fat the location of Shelburne, who happens to be Doris McGarrett, Steve's supposedly dead mother. Wo Fat eventually confronts Doris in Steve's home and the two engage in a stand-off, holding each other at gunpoint. However, Doris fires three shots into the ground, giving Wo Fat time to escape although it's not known the extent of the relationship Doris has with Wo Fat. In "Hana I Wa 'I", Wo Fat kidnaps a congressman and is about to kill him until a helicopter manned by Steve with Danny firing arrives on scene. Wo Fat exchanges gunfire with Danny before fleeing yet again. In "Imi Loko Ka 'Uhane", Wo Fat returns, disguised as a police officer, and when reporter Savannah Walker interviews him during the show she videotaped about Five-0, McGarrett notices Wo Fat and started to shoot him but he got away. Later in the episode, Five-0 tracks him to the jungle where he gets severely injured when the helicopter he tries to escape in gets shot down. McGarrett refuses to kill him and instead sends him to the hospital with police guarding the hospital, where he is bandaged and handcuffed to the bed. In "Aloha, Malama Pono", Wo Fat is seen lying in a bed in a high risk detention facility at an unknown location with Steve standing in the room, staring at him. At the end of the episode, McGarrett pays him another visit and wants to know why his mother came to see him. Wo Fat agrees to tell him, but first McGarrett has to get Fat out of the jail. Then they both hear an explosion. Fat tells Steve that he is his protection because the unknown forces currently breaking down the door are not here to rescue him, but want him dead.

As the fourth season begins, "In Aloha kekahi i kekahi", NLM terrorists attempt to kill Wo Fat but McGarrett saves him. Before Wo Fat is transferred to a Supermax facility in Colorado, McGarrett wants an answer from Wo Fat why Doris visited him. Fat says she wanted to apologize to him for killing his father. In "O ka Pili'Ohana ka 'Oi", he is given medication in his solitary confinement cell by an officer for his heart condition. He is asked to swallow the medication and open his mouth so that it is certain he ingested it. Wo Fat hides the pills well in his mouth and reaches inside his toilet to reveal that this is not the first time he has faked it. He then uses the medication along with paint thinner and fertilizer from the jail, to craft an explosion to take out a wall in his cell to escape. He is positively ID'd at a gas station near Colorado Springs, pouring gasoline on someone, lighting them on fire, then stealing their truck to head back to Oahu. After Grover's daughter Samantha is freed from Ian Wright's capture, she tells everyone that a man, revealed to be Wo Fat, killed Ian and released her. McGarrett is given a message from Samantha that Wo Fat will see him soon.

In the 100th episode, "Ina Paha", Wo Fat abducts Steve and tortures him in order to try to learn where he believes the U.S. government is holding his father. During the torture, he tells Steve that Doris had adopted him from the streets after her op went bad and his mother was killed. Doris raised him for some time before she was forced by the CIA to abandon him. After a long fight, Steve kills Wo Fat. His last words were, "You're not going to kill me. Are you... Brother?"

==== Victor and Anton Hesse ====
Victor and Anton Hesse (James Marsters and Norman Reedus) are brothers and criminals heavily involved in the illegal arms trafficking trade. During his days as a SEAL, McGarrett was part of a task force which had been investigating and tracking the Hesse brothers for several years. He and his buddy Freddie Hart were sent into North Korea on a classified operation to kidnap Anton Hesse but Hart was killed and Anton was eventually killed when the convoy he and McGarrett were being transported in was attacked. In the pilot, McGarrett personally shoots Victor Hesse but his body was never found. Victor later resurfaces and is eventually caught and sent to prison where he is killed by Wo Fat who was posing as a corrections officer.

==== Gabriel Waincroft ====
Gabriel Waincroft (Christopher Sean) is the younger brother of Malia Waincroft, the late wife of Chin Ho Kelly. As an adolescent he repeatedly got into trouble with the law and Malia went to Chin, then her boyfriend, for help in setting him straight. Gabriel was initiated into a gang after killing Chin's father and rose through the ranks of the (fictional) Culiacan cartel based in Sinaloa, Mexico. With Wo Fat's death, Waincroft is now the team's primary antagonist. He has been described as daring and ambitious, particularly after he had his men attempt to assassinate the heads of three different criminal syndicates during a high-profile boxing match (the attempt was discreetly foiled by Five-0), in the episode "Ka Makau kaa kaua / The Sweet Science". In "Pa'a Ka 'ipuka I Ka 'Upena Nananana", he was badly wounded and died in surgery from cardiac arrest. His daughter Sarah is currently being cared for by Chin as her legal guardian.

==== Michelle Shioma ====
Michelle Shioma (Michelle Krusiec) is the daughter of the late Goro Shioma and his successor as head of the Hawaiian Yakuza. Introduced in season 6, she is seeking revenge after Gabriel Waincroft has her father assassinated in an attempt to gain control of the criminal underworld in Hawaii. She is married with two daughters. It is mentioned in season 8 that she had been murdered in prison.

==== Sang Min Soo ====
Sang Min Soo (Will Yun Lee) is an informant and former snakehead who was associated with Wo Fat and imprisoned on the mainland for his safety after he testified against his former associates. He chooses to be transferred to Halawa to be nearer to his young son. His appearances are often met with annoyance by the Five-0 team as he would mock McGarrett and Chin, try to rile Danny up or crack inappropriate jokes at Kono (he calls her "Spicy Hot"). The team generally tolerate him as he does provide valuable and much-needed intel for the team on several occasions.

==== Toast Charles ====
Adam "Toast" Charles (Martin Starr) is one of Danny Williams' CIs. He is a highly skilled hacker who sometimes helps the Five-0 team with cases related to the cyber-crime underworld that require a more underhanded approach. He was killed in the Season 8 episode "E uhi wale no 'a'ole e nalo, he imu puhi" / "No Matter How Much One Covers a Steaming Imu, The Smoke Will Rise" after his identity as a CI was leaked.

==== August March ====
August March (Ed Asner) is a renowned diamond smuggler who was jailed for over three decades and had been released from prison for six months, according to Captain Fryer in the season 2 episode "Kalele / Faith". He committed suicide in Season 3. Ed Asner portrayed the character in the original series and was one of several actors who returned to the 2010 reboot.

==== JC Dekker ====
Jason "JC" Dekker (Xzibit, credited by his real name Alvin Joiner) is a former gang leader and small-time arms dealer who was re-arrested for violating his parole. The Five-0 Task Force crossed paths with him while investigating the murder of an undercover ATF agent in the episode "Ua Nalohia / In Deep".

==== Detective Kaleo ====
Detective Kaleo (Jason Scott Lee) is a corrupt former Honolulu Police Department cop who was imprisoned for his involvement in the murder of fellow cop Detective Meka Hanamoa, who was the partner of Detective Danny Williams when the latter first joined the HPD. He was initially housed in protective custody due to his former occupation but was sent to "general population" after he aided his brother Daryl in the trafficking of conflict diamonds, indirectly causing McGarrett's sister to be coerced into becoming a mule. His brother is killed in Season 2 and Kaleo is finally killed in Season 3 by Chin Ho Kelly when he tries to kill him.

==== Frank Delano ====
Frank Delano (William Baldwin) is a corrupt former HPD homicide detective who founded his own criminal syndicate composed exclusively of former cops. After Kono was "fired", Delano recruited her into the syndicate. Unbeknownst to him, it was part of Captain Fryer's plot to arrest Delano and his associates. Delano was killed by Chin after Five-0 cornered him and his crew in the season 3 premiere. His brother Paul (portrayed by William Baldwin's real-life brother Daniel) later seeks revenge by drugging and kidnapping Chin.

==== Gerard Hirsch ====
Gerard Hirsch (Willie Garson) is a known conman who did time in Halawa after being arrested in the episode "Uaʻaihue" for stealing a Van Gogh painting and for forgery. The team encounter him again in season 6 during an investigation into a case involving a dead counterfeiter and his stash of counterfeit hundred-dollar bills found on several murder victims. Hirsch currently runs his own crime scene clean-up company as part of his plan to "reform" and live an honest life. His expertise as a highly skilled former forger and extensive knowledge of art history have come into handy at times.

==== Jason Duclair ====
Jason Duclair (Randy Couture) is a serial arsonist and murderer who was notorious for picking married couples and setting their houses on fire, after ensuring that their doors, windows, and any exits were locked. He was wanted for a series of deaths by arson throughout California but went into hiding for a period before resurfacing in Hawaii. He is imprisoned in the maximum security section of Halawa. He committed suicide in the Season 8 premiere.

==== Greer ====
Greer
- First appearance: "Ka ʻōwili ʻōka’i"/"Cocoon" episode 9.01,(recurring role)
- Last appearance: "Hala ike ola o,ole mai"/"gone on the road from which there is no returning" episode 9.11
- Portrayed by: Rochelle Aytes

In-universe information
- Occupation: CIA agent
- Significant other: Steve McGarrett (ex- boyfriend)

Greer was a CIA agent who had previously met Steve McGarrett after he got his Trident, but before he started dating Catherine Rollins. They spent two days of R&R in a Marrakesh fleabag before Steve was deployed and he left her a note. She is later revealed to be a mole in the CIA, committing treason. Her treason causes the death of Joe White and many of Steve's SEAL friends. Greer was finally killed by Catherine Rollins.

==== Aaron Wright ====
Aaron Wright
- First appearance: "A'ole E 'olwlo mai Ana ko ahi UA Ana äi"/"Fire Will Never Say That It Has Had Enough " episode 8.01,(recurring guest star)
- Portrayed by: Joey Lawrence

In-universe information
- Family: Ian Wright (brother; deceased)

Aaron Wright is Ian's brother.

==== Ian Wright ====
Ian Wright
- First appearance: "Akanahe"/" Reluctant Partners " episode (4.08)
- Last appearance: " oka pili'ohana ka ' oi"/" Family Comes First" episode (4.22)
- Portrayed by: Nick Jonas

In-universe information
- Family: Aaron Wright (brother)

Ian Wright was a hacker who was originally arrested by a reluctantly paired McGarrett and Grover for unpaid parking tickets, only for Wright to be kidnapped by a group of bank robbers. It is later revealed that Wright was the mastermind behind the robberies and escapes before he can be arrested. He later reappears, kidnapping Samantha Grover to blackmail Grover into providing a group of mercenaries SWAT gear to commit a robbery of $100 million. He is unable to get his hands on the money as he is killed by Wo Fat, who escaped from his SuperMax prison and released Samantha to send McGarrett a message.

==== Daiyu Mei ====
Daiyu Mei is Wo Fat's widow and arms dealer who seeks revenge against McGarrett for her husband's death. She is eventually captured by McGarrett in the series finale.
