= Kala Alexander =

American surfer and actor (born 1969)

Personal information
- Born: March 20, 1969 (age 57) Wahiawa, Hawaii, U.S.
- Height: 5 ft 10 in (1.78 m)
- Weight: 175 lb (79 kg)

Surfing career
- Sport: Surfing
- Sponsors: RVCA

Surfing specifications
- Stance: regular
- Favorite waves: Banzai Pipeline

Kala Alexander (born March 20, 1969) is a Hawaiian surfer, surf gang co-founder and actor. He founded the Wolfpak surf gang on the North Shore of Oahu. In addition, Alexander is an actor, playing roles in projects such as Blue Crush, Forgetting Sarah Marshall, and Hawaii Five-0.

== Early life ==
Kala Alexander was born on Oahu but moved to Hanalei, Kauai, shortly afterwards. He was raised by his mother, Virginia Alexander, who was from Detroit, Michigan. He is of Hawaiian, Filipino, Irish, German, and Scottish descent. Alexander received a scholarship to attend the private Kamehameha School on Oahu when he was 13 for scoring in the top five percent on statewide tests. However, at the end of his sophomore year of high school, he was expelled for smoking marijuana and insubordination. Alexander graduated high school back home in Kauai.

1992 was what Alexander called "the most painful, hurtful year I've had in my whole life." Alexander lost the roof of his house in Hurricane Iniki. His mother was injured in the floods, and she died from her injuries. In addition, his half brother's father's four-year-old girl was raped and murdered. Alexander was arrested and sentenced to five years in prison for assault after beating up a man who ran over his pit bull and killed him. He was released after nine months for good behavior, but was readmitted for 16 months after violating the conditions of his parole.

== Wolfpak ==
In 2001, Alexander moved to Oahu in search of job opportunities after he got a divorce from his wife. On the North Shore, he discovered that the popular surfing location, Banzai Pipeline, suffered from disorganization and lack of respect in the surf lineup. Alexander and Kai Garcia co-founded the Wolfpak, a surf gang, which is mainly composed of surfers from Kauai. Alexander is the enforcer of the group, who believes in preserving the value of respect to the experienced surfers, those who are native Hawaiians, and to protect surfers from the area's life-threatening waves. Alexander has beaten people up on multiple occasions for dropping in on other surfers.

== Acting career and recent projects ==
In 2002, Alexander got his first acting role, playing an angry local in the movie Blue Crush. He also acted in the films Forgetting Sarah Marshall and Into the Blue 2: The Reef. Since 2010, he has played a recurring role as Kawika in Hawaii Five-0.

Alexander starred in a special for Discovery Channel's Shark Week in 2014. Called "Sharkageddeon," it attempts to explain why shark attacks are increasing in Hawaii. Alexander also appeared in an episode of "Shark After Dark," where he discussed his experience filming that episode.

Alexander is the Vice President of the Mauli Ola Foundation, an organization for people with cystic fibrosis. Alexander visits with children in hospitals in Hawaii and gives them surfing lessons.

== Filmography ==
Film performances
Year	Title	Role	Notes
2002	Blue Crush	Kala	
2004	The Big Bounce	himself	
2008	Forgetting Sarah Marshall	Greg	
2009	Into the Blue 2: The Reef	Smuggler	

Television performances
Year	Title	Role	Notes
2004	North Shore	Local #1	Episode: "Meteor Shower"
2007	John from Cincinnati	Moana	Episode: "His Visit, Day Nine"
2010–2016	Hawaii Five-0	Kawika	Recurring cast
2017	Inhumans	Makani	Recurring
2018	Magnum P.I.	Chop Shop Boss/Kawika	Episodes: "I Saw the Sun Rise", "Day the Past Came Back"
