= Kāhili =

Symbol of the aliʻi chiefs and families of the Hawaiian Islands

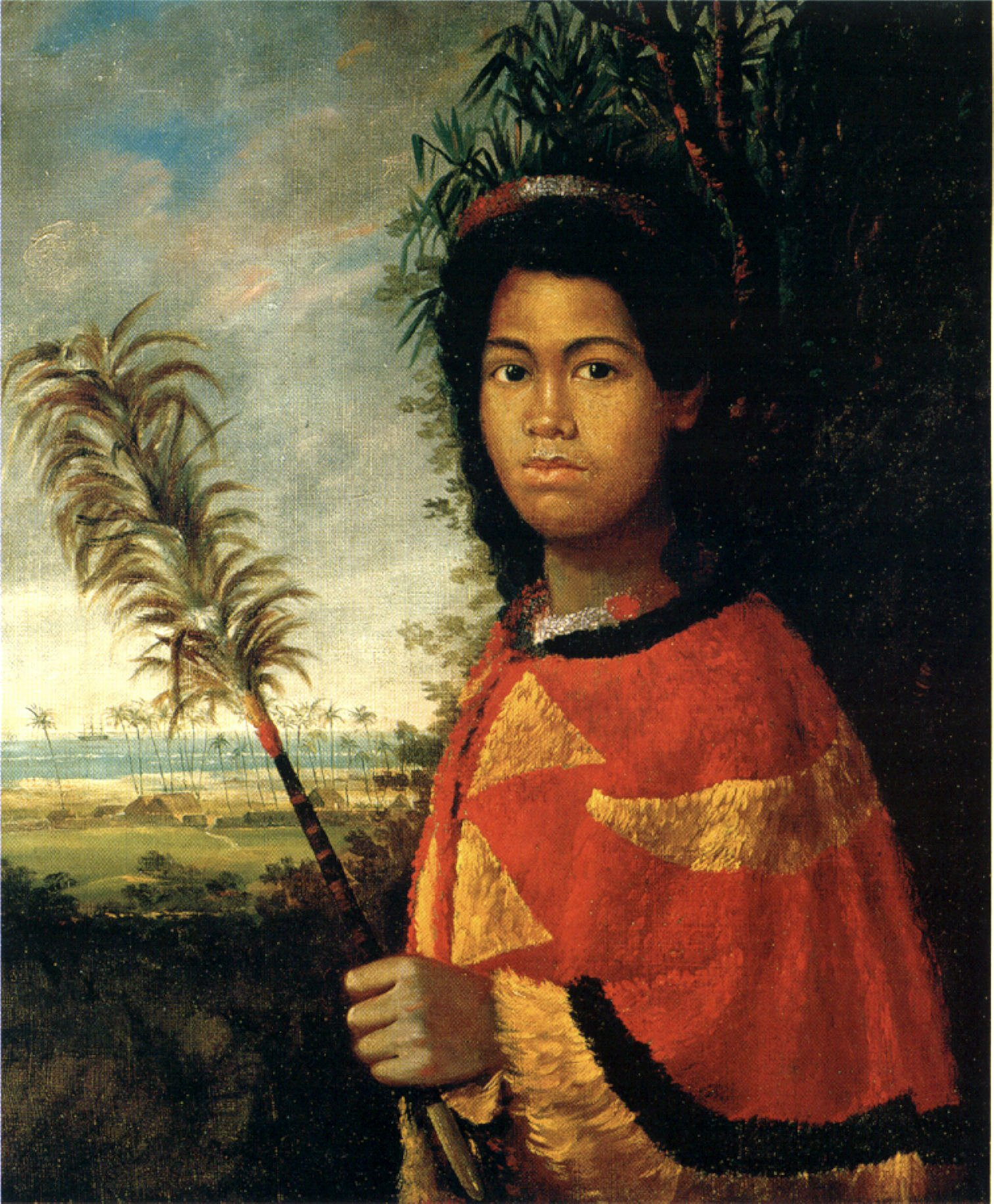
Portrait of Princess Nāhiʻenaʻena holding the feathered royal kāhili, by Robert Dampier

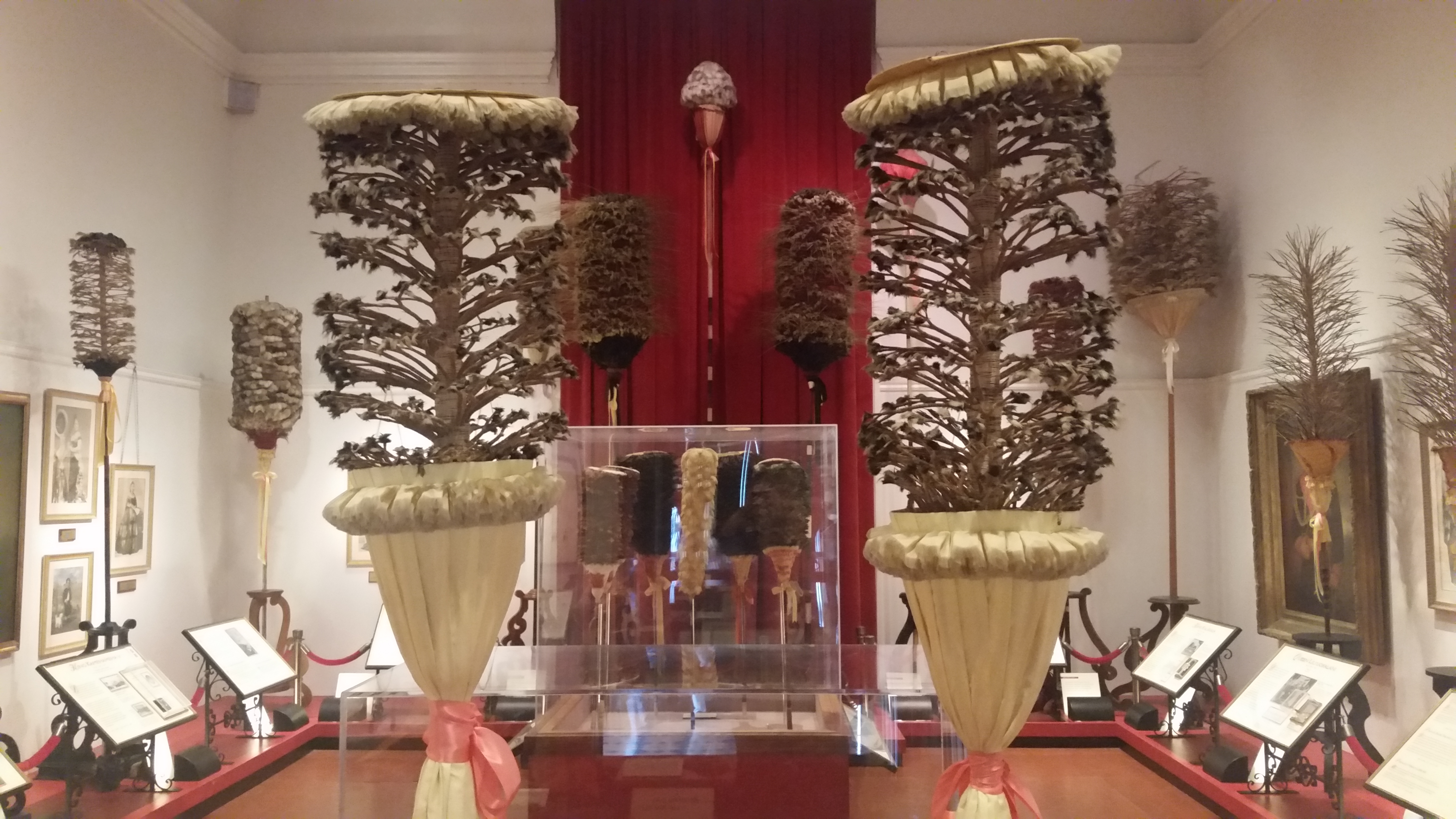
Bishop Museum Kāhili Room

A kāhili is a symbol of the aliʻi chiefs and families of the Hawaiian Islands. It was taken by the Kamehamehas as a Hawaiian royal standard and used by the Royal Families to indicate their lineage.

== History ==
The kāhili has long been a symbol of the Hawaiian aliʻi chiefs and the noble houses of the Hawaiian Islands. A kāhili bearer (pa'a-kāhili) is one who carries or bears the standard for the royal subject. The kāhili signified power from the divinities. The Ali'i surrounded themselves with the standard. It was made using the long bones of an enemy king and decorated with the feathers from birds of prey. The Royal Coat of Arms of the Kingdom of Hawaii depicts the twin Kameʻeiamoku holding a feather standard. Among the pieces collected on Captain Cook's voyages were numerous feathered artifacts including 7 kāhili of the normal design before European influence. In 1825 while aboard the visiting ship returning the remains of Kamehameha II from England, Robert Dampier painted a portrait of Princess Nāhiʻenaʻena holding the royal feather standard.

The Bishop Museum, which was founded in 1889 has an extensive collection of feathered standards on display along with portraits of the monarchs of the 19th century. Their collection is displayed in the "Kāhili Room". There were also servants who used the kahili as fly-brushes for the royal in his sleeping quarters.

== Kāhili bearer ==
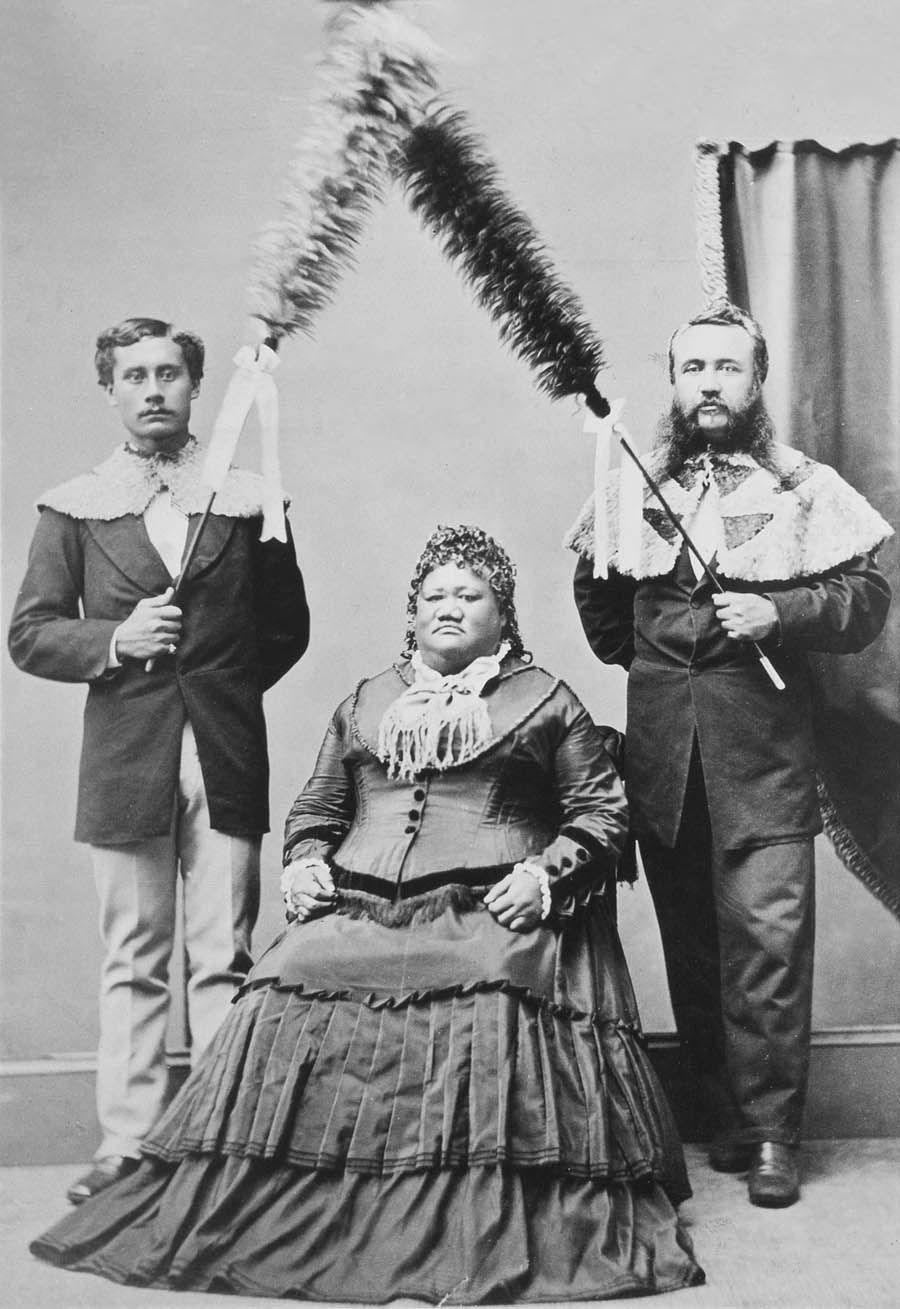
Kāhili bearers for Keʻelikōlani

Only the ali'i had the right to possess kāhili; It was considered a staff of state. A pa'a-kāhili (kāhili bearer) followed the king everywhere he went (publicly). The standard could be used as a fly-brush and were waved over the sleeping noble or royal by servants, and these kāhili-bearers working in the sleeping chambers were called haʻakuʻe, and were necessarily of the same gender as their master. (Note: haʻakuʻe was otherwise known as kua-lana-puhi or olu-eke-loa-hoo-kaa-moena accord. to Malo.) A ha'aku'e was a kāhili bearer of the same sex as the person they served. The role was similar to that of a squire or page.

=== Funeral rites ===
The hana lawelawe of the pa'a-kāhili is an important ritual duty at a Hawaiian noble's funeral. From the time the body is laid out to the moment it is interred, the bearers wave the kāhili above the deceased. Three of four kāhili bearers stand on either side and at regular intervals raise the standards above the body until they meet the opposing feathered staff on the other side. The standards are then waved to the right, left and then up while genealogy chants are sung detailing the deeds of the figure and their ancestors. When the body is transported from the home to the church, the hearse is surrounded by kāhili bearers. Once at the chapel the ritual continues, as well as while transferring the deceased to the cemetery. At Bernice Pauahi Bishop's funeral, 150 black kāhili were carried and displayed.

== Crafting ==
Feather crafting is something that was brought to the islands from the first Polynesian voyagers, however, Hawaii has the most advanced examples. The feathers of small birds that were held in high regard for their religious significance were used in crafting a number of the regalia of the Hawaiian chiefs. The ʻahu ʻula, mahiole, kāhili and other objects of the aliʻi were made with these sacred feathers.

The native goose (nene) and crow (ʻalalā) were sources of kāhili feathers, and these were also eaten. The "choicest" kāhili derived its feathers from the native owl (pueo) and hawk (ʻio).

A skilled craftsman would be used to create these specific items. The craft was a strong hereditary bond and was passed to younger generations from older experts. The poʻe hahai manu were the expert feather gatherers and would spend months in collection hunts in the forest. Collecting the feathers would sometimes be done for generations.

== See also ==
- Pūloʻuloʻu
