= ʻAumakua =

Hawaiian personal or family god

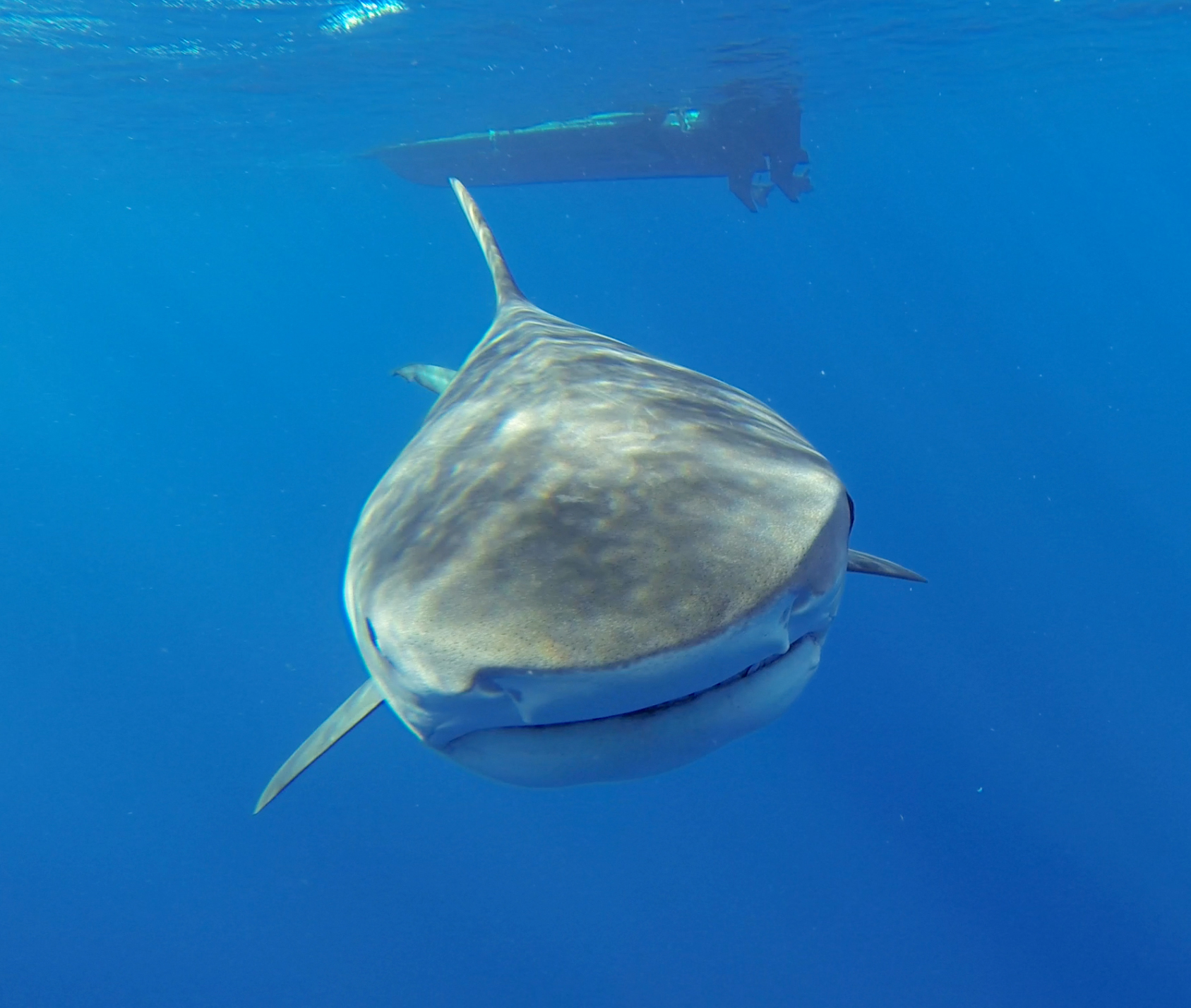
Manō (shark)

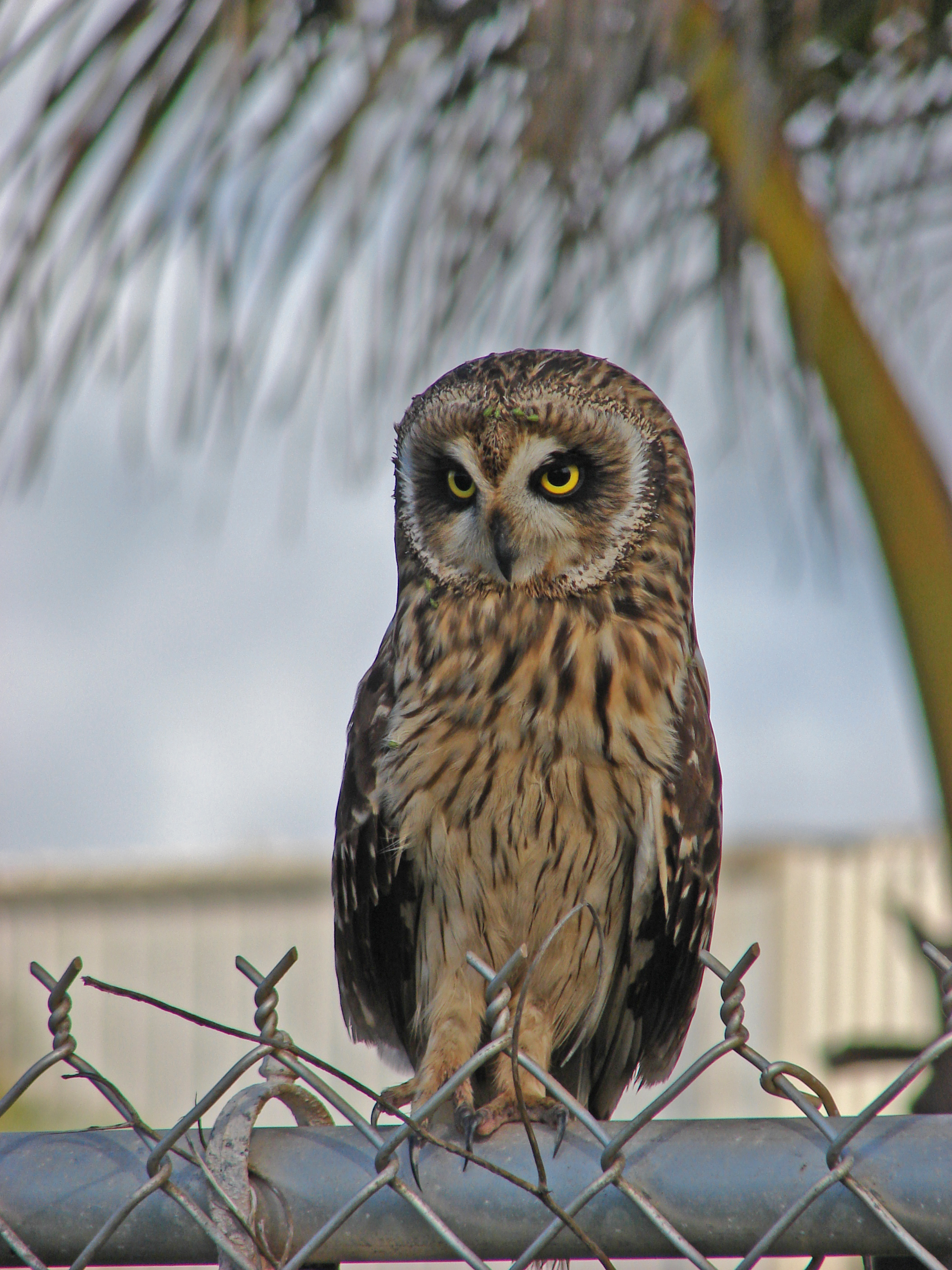
Pueo (owl)

Two of the forms an ʻaumakua may take

In Hawaiian mythology, an ʻaumakua (/ʔaʊmɑːˈkuə/; often spelled aumakua, plural, ʻaumākua) is a personal or family god that originated as a deified ancestor, and which takes on physical forms such as spirit vehicles. An ʻaumakua may manifest as a shark, owl, bird, octopus, or inanimate objects such as plants or rocks. The word ʻaumakua means ancestor gods and is derived from the Hawaiian words "au", which means period of time or era, and "makua", meaning parent, parent generation, or ancestor. Hawaiians believed that deceased family members would transform into ʻaumākua and watch over their descendants with a loving concern for them while also being the judge and jury of their actions.

ʻAumākua were believed to watch over their families and hear their words, give them strength and guidance, warn them of misfortune or danger, give punishments to wrong-doers while also rewarding worthy people with prosperity in the afterlife, and pass on prayers from the living to the akua (gods).

Hawaiian-born actor Jason Momoa has a half-sleeve tattoo on his left forearm that is a tribute to his family god, or ʻaumakua, which is a shark. Some families had many ʻaumākua. Mary Kawena Pukui's family had at least fifty known ʻaumākua.

== Roles of ʻaumākua ==
ʻAumākua could give warnings of coming misfortune or danger, punishments, and guidance to their respective ʻohana (families). ʻAumākua relayed these messages to family members through hōʻike a ka pō (revelation in the night, dreams), visions, or physical manifestations. Hawaiians also believed that "just the nagging feeling that something is wrong" was a message sent from their ʻaumākua.

ʻAumākua were also protectors of their families. An example of this comes from the Puna district on Hawaiʻi island which was shared with anthropologist Martha Beckwith: "...this one family... had a supernatural helper or aumakua who appeared in the form of a particular shark. When any of the family go fishing, the shark appears. The aumakua obeys the voice of man. Name the fish you want and it will bring it. This family can never be drowned. If there is a storm and the boat capsizes, the shark appears and the men ride on its back."

As protectors, ʻaumākua could also give mental or physical strength to ʻohana members who were in need of help but could not help themselves, primarily the keiki (children), the sick, and the elderly.

ʻAumākua could also bring punishment to families who offended or displeased them. These offenses included behavior like greed, dishonesty, and theft, breaking ʻai kapu, bathing in pools that were kapu (taboo), and eating the physical form of ones ʻaumakua. Punishments were often illnesses in the form of "diagnostic clues", so a thief would develop a swollen hand or a sore foot would trouble a trespasser until they made restitution.

ʻAumākua also acted as judge and jury after a person's death. They had the power to punish or reward the person's spirit depending on whether or not that person lived a righteous life, or even send the spirit back to the body if it left the body prematurely in "apparent deaths".

== Physical forms ==
ʻAumākua could appear as:

- ʻalalā – crow
- heʻe – octopus
- ʻiole liʻiliʻi – small field mice
- manō – shark
- mea kanu – plant
- moa wahine – mud hen
- moʻo – lizard
- peʻelua – caterpillars
- pōhaku – rock
- pueo – a subspecies of short-eared owl
- puhi – eel

ʻAumākua were able to take on kino lau (many bodies, many forms) which means that they could change back and forth from "invisible people" (poʻe or ka pō), animals, plants, and minerals. ʻAumākua as animals could also inhabit plants that had similar characteristics or visual resemblance to that animal. For example, ʻaumākua as mackerel (ʻōpelu) were also associated with the lobelia plant (also called ʻōpleu) whose leaves are a similar shape and color as the fish.

== In popular culture ==
- The 2016 Nintendo video games Pokémon Sun and Pokémon Moon, which are set in a fictional archipelago inspired by the real-world location of Hawaii, make reference to various aspects of Hawaiian culture, including the ʻaumakua. Tapu Koko is called the guardian deity of Melemele Island and has a mask-like shell that looks like a stylized rooster head.
- In the 2016 Disney animated film Moana, the concept of the ʻaumakua is an inspiration for Tala's transformation into a manta ray; the ʻaumakua is referenced by name in pre-production artwork.
- In "Ka laina ma ke one" ("Line in the Sand"), a seventh season episode of the U.S. television series Hawaii Five-O, Kono Kalakaua mentions that her family's ʻaumakua is the manō, which motivates her to protect them.
