= Mother and Son (disambiguation) =

Mother and Son is an Australian television sitcom.

Mother and Son may also refer to:

- Mother and Son (1931 film), a film directed by John P. McCarthy
- Mother and Son (1997 film), a Russian film
- Mother and Son (2022 film), a French film
- Mother and Son (2023 TV series), a 2023 reboot television series of the Australian sitcom
- "Mother and Son" (Dynasty), a 1982 episode of the American TV series Dynasty
- Mother and Son, a 1923 play by Louis Esson
- Mother and Son, a 1955 novel by Ivy Compton-Burnett
- "Ka Makuahine A Me Ke Keikikane" (or "Mother and Son"), the seventh episode of the seventh season of Hawaii Five-0

== See also ==
- Mothers and Sons (disambiguation)
