= Ka Makuahine A Me Ke Keikikane =

- Hawaii Five-0 episode
- Steve McGarrett and Catherine Rollins have a final conversation before she leaves, in the background Doris McGarrett meets Lou Grover for the first time and says hello to the other members of the team.
- Episode no.: Season 7 Episode 7
- Directed by: Bryan Spicer
- Written by: Eric Guggenheim; David Wolkove
- Cinematography by: Krishna Rao
- Editing by: Roderick Davis
- Production code: 707
- Original air date: November 4, 2016
- Running time: 44 minutes

Guest appearances
- Christine Lahti as Doris McGarrett; Sarah Carter as Lynn Downey; Chosen Jacobs as Will Grover; George Cheung as Yao Fat; Michelle Borth as Catherine Rollins; Teilor Grubbs as Grace Williams; Londyn Silzer as Sara Diaz; Emma Lahti as Young Doris McGarrett; Nicolai Makana Perez as 10-year old Steve McGarrett; Jacob Miller as 15-year old Steve McGarrett

Episode chronology
← Previous "Ka hale ho'okauwel"	Next → "Hana Komo Pae"
- Hawaii Five-0 (2010 TV series, season 7)

"Ka makuahine a me ke keikikane" (Hawaiian for: "Mother and Son") is the seventh episode of the seventh season of Hawaii Five-0. It is also the one hundred and fiftieth episode of the series overall. In the episode Catherine Rollins surprisingly contacts Steve McGarrett and informs him that his mother Doris McGarrett was detained in an attempt to free Yao Fat, Wo Fat's father, out of a detainment facility. The episode aired on November 4, 2016 on CBS. It was written by Eric Guggenheim and David Wolkove and was directed by Bryan Spicer. The episode featured the past return of former main and recurring characters including Michelle Borth, Christine Lahti, and Sarah Carter and received mostly positive reviews.

== Plot ==
The episode begins with Steve McGarrett having a romantic dinner with his girlfriend Lynn Downey. During the dinner Steve is contacted by his ex-girlfriend Catherine Rollins who informs him of an incident that she can not disclose over the phone and that she will by drop by. Catherine arrives at Steve's house where he introduces Lynn and Catherine to each other. Catherine then tells him that there has been an incident with Steve's mother Doris McGarrett who was detained in a detainment facility in Morocco after attempting to free Yao Fat. Steve and Catherine travel to Morocco to rescue Doris.

The two find a safe house to acquire satellite views and security plans and begin making a plan. However, before they finish Chin Ho Kelly, Kono Kalakaua, and Lou Grover arrive at the safe house and offer their assistance. The team finds and infiltrates the detainment facility, Chin and Catherine take defensive positions while Kono and Lou take tactical positions. Steve successfully finds Doris with the assistance of Chin and Catherine and prepares to sneak out of the compound. However, Doris informs him that she refuses to leave unless they agree to take Yao with them. Steve and Doris find Yao and free him. Just as the team prepares to leave a security guard is alerted of their presence and sounds an alarm. Steve, Doris, and Yao are then captured by a team of guards just to be shortly rescued by Catherine and Chin. They find a hidden charge of C4 explosive that Doris hid on her way in. They blow up a former sewer tunnel that had been sealed off and the entire team escapes through the sewer tunnel.

At the airport Doris tells Steve that he can find information about her younger days at his house under a loose floorboard. Following this Catherine informs Steve that she has another assignment and is leaving with Doris and Yao. She then tells him that she knows Steve was going to propose to her before she left. Steve asks her what she would have said had he actually proposed and Catherine tells him that she would have said yes. Back in Hawaii, Chin is forced to face an empty home after losing Sara in a court custody battle. Lou attempts to get his son Will to find out who Danny's daughter Grace is dating.

== Production ==
=== Development ===
By July 2016 the episode was in pre-production. Filming for the episode began on September 2, 2016 and officially concluded on September 8, 2016. Craig Cannold directed the episode while Krishna Rao provided principal photography and Roderick Davis directed the episode. Eric Guggenheim and David Wolkove wrote the episode.

=== Casting ===
On July 29, 2016 it was announced that Michelle Borth and Christine Lahti would return as Catherine Rollins and Doris McGarrett respectively. On August 30, 2016 it was announced that Sarah Carter would be returning to the show as Lynn Downey, Steve McGarrett's love interest who last appeared in a season 6 Valentine's Day themed episode. Despite being credited in the opening title sequence Scott Caan, Masi Oka, and Jorge Garcia as Danny Williams, Max Bergman, and Jerry Ortega respectively were absent from the episode; Cann's character was mentioned multiple times within the episode. On October 27, 2016 it was announced that Christine Lahti's daughter Emma Lahti, also known as Emma Schlamme, would be guest starring as a younger Doris McGarrett in flashbacks.

== Reception ==
=== Viewing figures ===
The episode aired on November 4, 2016 on CBS. It was watched live and same day by a total of 9.48 million viewers and within seven days the episode was watched by a total of 12.21 million viewers. The episode ranked as the thirteenth highest rated episode to air on television that week.

=== Alex O'Loughlin post-episode interviews ===
In a post-episode interview with TV Guide lead actor Alex O'Loughlin stated that the McGarrett and Rollins relationship "had now been finished the right way" and that "McGarrett would be an idiot to take Catherine back". When asked if there was hope for a romantic reunion between the two characters O'Loughlin stated: "The way she [Catherine] left things, it was pretty disgraceful. That being said, it does offer some closure for him. It's now been finished the right way. I just think if she [Catherine] came back and went, 'I'm available'... first of all, he [McGarrett] really likes Lynn. She's [Lynn] a great girl. And I don't think he [McGarrett] would just ditch her [Lynn]. That would be the wrong thing to do."

In a later interview with TVLine O'Loughlin was asked why McGarrett pushed for an answer on what Catherine would've said had he proposed he said "I think he wants to hear her say, 'It wasn’t you, you weren't the problem. I was the problem.'" and when asked if Catherine's hypothetical proposal answer should raise red flags his response was "Absolutely not. No f–king way, Catherine is not 'the one who got away' but 'the one who was not meant to be.'"

=== Critical reception ===
Reviews toward the episode were mostly positive. TV Fanatic gave the episode an editorial rating of 4 out of 5 stars and a user rating of 4.5 out of 5 stars based on 35 reviews.

== Broadcast, streaming, and home video releases ==
The episode was released on DVD and Blu-ray along with the other season 7 episodes in a 6-disc box set which also features deleted scenes and commentary. The DVD set was released in region one on September 5, 2017 and in region two on September 18, 2017. The episode can also be viewed on demand with a CBS All Access subscription as well as with a Netflix subscription. The episode can be individually purchased on Amazon and Vudu.

== See also ==
- List of Hawaii Five-0 (2010 TV series) episodes
- Hawaii Five-0 (2010 TV series) season 7
