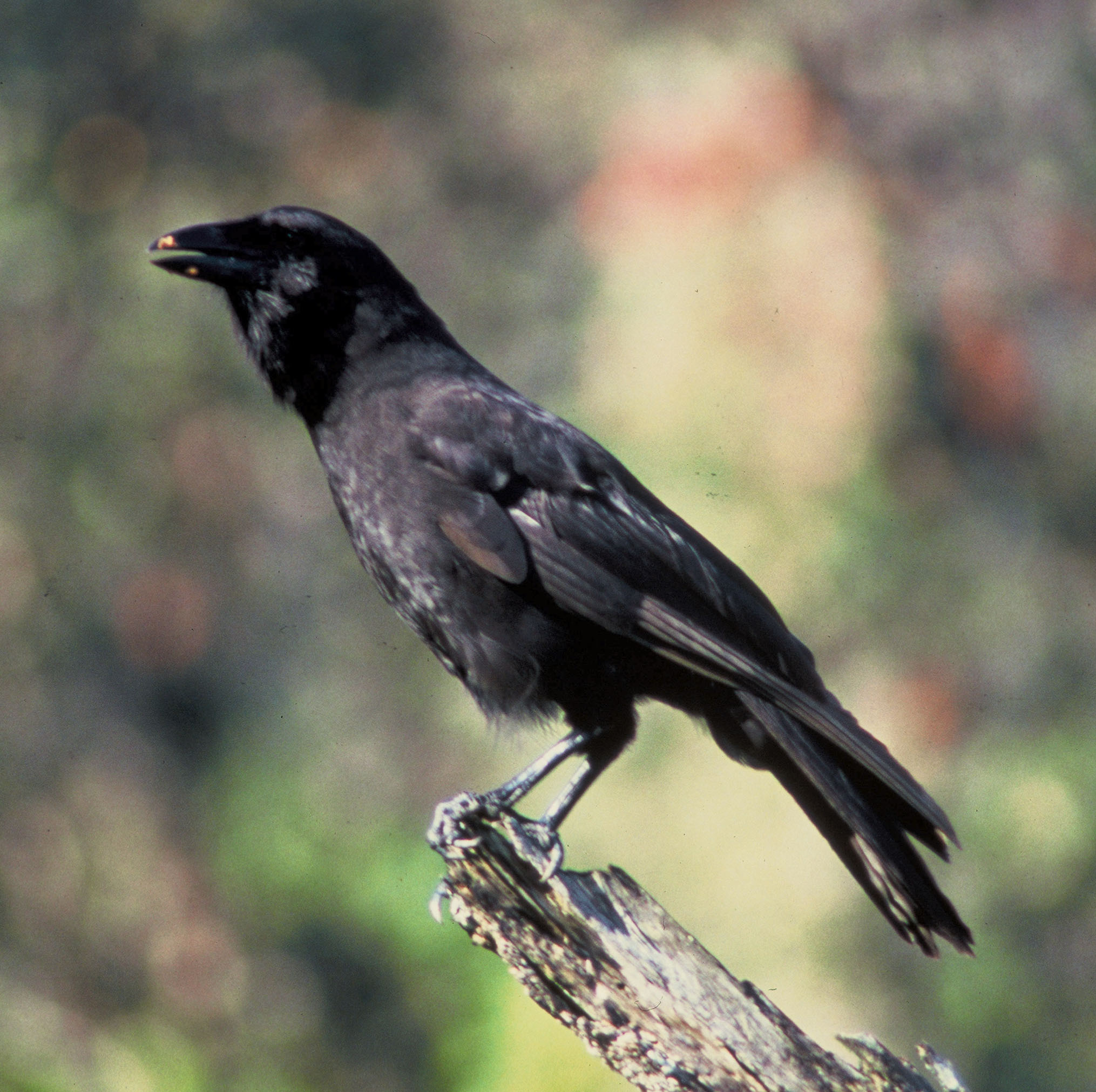

Conservation status
- Extinct in the Wild (IUCN 3.1)

- Possibly Extinct (NatureServe)

Scientific classification
- Kingdom: Animalia
- Phylum: Chordata
- Class: Aves
- Order: Passeriformes
- Family: Corvidae
- Genus: Corvus
- Species: C. hawaiiensis

Binomial name
- Corvus hawaiiensis Peale, 1849
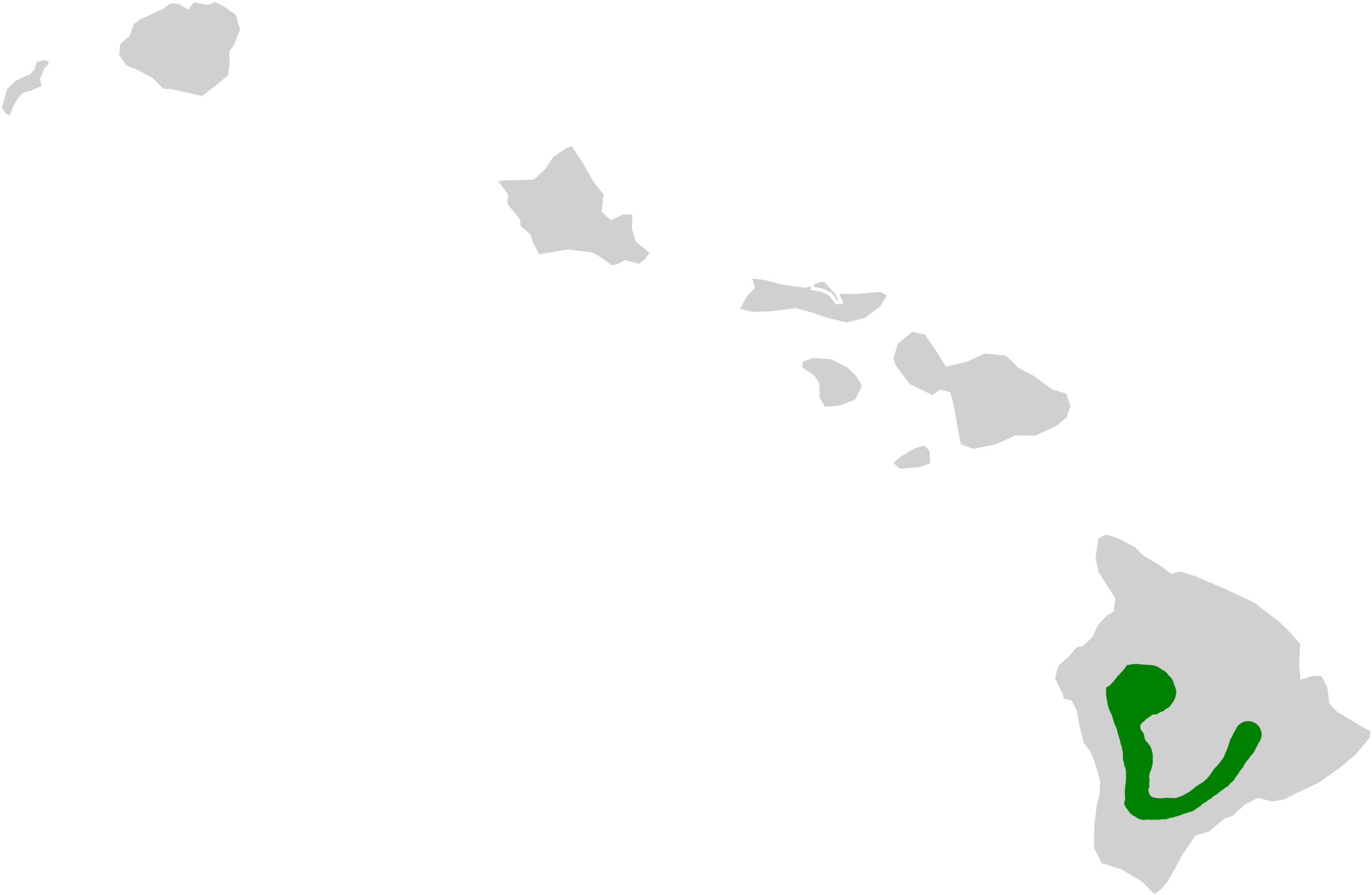
- Corvus hawaiiensis was previously endemic to Hawaiʻi

= Hawaiian crow =

Species of bird in the crow family

The Hawaiian crow or ʻalalā (Corvus hawaiiensis) is a species of bird in the crow family, Corvidae, that is currently extinct in the wild, though reintroduction programs are underway. It is about the size of the carrion crow at 48–50 cm (19–20 in) in length, but with more rounded wings and a much thicker bill. It has soft, brownish-black plumage and long, bristly throat feathers; the feet, legs, and bill are black. Today, the Hawaiian crow is considered the most endangered of the family Corvidae. They are recorded to have lived up to 18 years in the wild, and 28 years in captivity. Some Native Hawaiians consider the Hawaiian crow an ʻaumakua (family god).

The species is known for its strong flying ability and resourcefulness, and the reasons for its various extirpations are not fully understood. It is thought that introduced diseases, introduced predators, and habitat loss were probably significant factors in the species' decline.

== Distribution and habitat ==
Before the Hawaiian crow became extinct in the wild, the species was found only in the western and southeastern parts of Hawaii. It inhabited dry and mesic forests on the slopes of Mauna Loa and Hualālai at elevations of 3,000 to 6,000 feet. Ōhiʻa lehua (Metrosideros polymorpha) and koa (Acacia koa) were important tree species in its wild habitat. Extensive understory cover was necessary to protect the ʻalalā from predation by the Hawaiian hawk, or ʻio (Buteo solitarius). Nesting sites of the ʻalalā received 600–2,500 millimetres (24–98 in) of annual rainfall. Fossil remains indicate that the Hawaiian crow used to be relatively abundant on all the main islands of Hawaii, along with four other now-extinct crow species.

The Hawaiian crow was also preyed on by rats and the small Asian mongooses (Urva auropunctata). Feral cats that introduced Toxoplasma gondii to the birds can also prey on chicks that are unable to fly. As of 2012, the Hawaiian crow's current population is 114 birds, the vast majority of which are in Hawaiian reserves.

== Behavior ==
=== Diet ===
The omnivorous Hawaiian crow is a generalist species, eating various foods as they become available. The main portion of their diet and 50% of their feeding activity is spent foraging on trunks, branches, and foliage for invertebrates such as isopods, land snails, and arachnids. They feed in a woodpecker fashion, flaking bark and moss from trunks or branches to expose hidden insects, foraging mostly on ohia and koa, the tallest and most dominant trees in their habitats. Fruits are the second most dominant component in the Hawaiian crow's diet. The crows often collect kepau and olapa fruit clusters. Although hoawa and alani fruits have hard outer coverings, crows continue to exert energy prying them open. Passerine Nestlings and eggs are consumed most frequently in April and May, during their breeding season. Other prey include red-billed leiothrix, Japanese white-eye, Hawaiʻi ʻamakihi, ʻIʻiwi, ʻelepaio, and ʻapapane. The ʻalalā also commonly forages on flowers, especially from February through May. Nectar to feed the young is obtained from the ohia flower, oha kepau, and purple poka during the nestling period. Crows also foraged various plant parts, including the flower petals of kolea, koa, and mamane. The palila is the only other Hawaiian bird known to eat flower petals. The ʻalalā only occasionally forages on the ground, but only for a limited amount of time for risk of predators.

=== Tool use ===
Captive individuals can use sticks as tools to extract food from holes drilled in logs. The juveniles exhibit tool use without training or social learning from adults, and it is believed to be a species-wide ability.

=== Voice ===
The Hawaiian crow has a call described variously as a two-toned caw and as a screech with lower tones added, similar to a cat's meow. In flight, this species has been known to produce a wide variety of calls including a repeated kerruk, kerruk sound and a loud kraa-a-a-ik sound. It also makes a ca-wk sound, has a complex, burbling song, and makes a variety of other sounds as well. The ʻalalā has at least 24 calls in its repertoire, including alarm calls, contact calls, and calls signifying submission or courtship.

This is a medley of the different calls the Hawaiian Crow makes.

=== Breeding and reproduction ===
Female crows are considered sexually mature at about 2 or 3 years of age and males at 4 years. The Hawaiian crow's breeding season lasts from March to July; it builds a nest in March or April, lays eggs in mid-to-late April, and the eggs hatch in mid-May. Both sexes construct nests with branches from the native ohi'a tree strengthened with grasses. The crow typically lays one to five eggs (that are greenish-blue in color) per season, although at most only two will survive past the fledgling phase. Only the females incubate the 2–5 eggs for 19–22 days and brood the young, of which only 1–2 fledge about 40 days after hatching. If the first clutch is lost, the pair will re-lay, which serves to be helpful in captive breeding efforts. Juveniles rely on their parents for 8 months and will stay with the family group until the next breeding season.

== Environmental role ==
The ʻalalā was one of the largest native bird populations in Hawaii. Its disappearance in the wild has had cascading effects on the environment, especially with the seed dispersal of the native plants. Many of these plants rely on the ʻalalā not only for seed dispersal but also for seed germination as seeds are passed through the crow's digestive system. Without seed dispersal, the plants have no means of growing another generation. The ʻalalā plays a key role in the maintenance of many indigenous plant species, which now could become a rarity in Hawaii's ecosystems, specifically the dry forests, without their main seed disperser. The Hawaiian crow has become known as an indicator species; the disappearance of the ʻalalā indicates serious environmental problems.

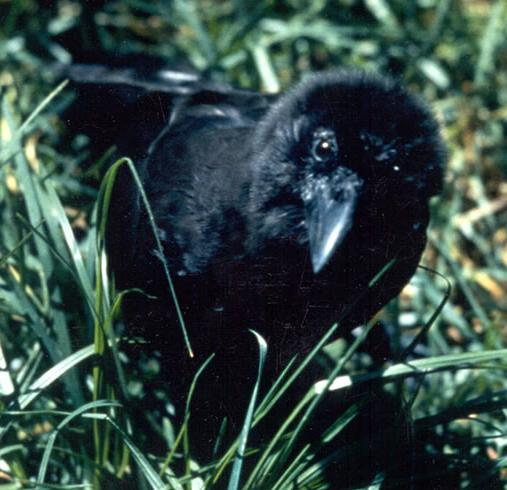
The Hawaiian crow faces an ample number of threats in the wild.

== Primary threats ==
The Hawaiian crow faces an ample number of threats in the wild, which are considered contributing factors to their extinction in the wild. Small population size makes the species more vulnerable to environmental fluctuations; this leads to a higher likelihood of inbreeding, which reduces the likelihood that offspring will survive to recruitment.

=== Habitat loss and hunting ===
ʻAlalā select habitat with ample cover and prefer areas with a large proportion of native plants for food and shelter. Polynesian and European farmers removed dry, lowland forest, restricting the ʻalalā to forest at higher elevation. After settlement by Europeans, the higher elevation forest was also compromised by extensive logging and ranching, and farm animals such as cattle, pigs, sheep, and goats being allowed to graze freely in these areas.

Polynesian cultures valued ʻalalā feathers for use in kāhili and for decorating idols used during the Makahiki season. For this purpose, professional birdcatchers (known as kia manu) working for King Kamehameha or local priests (ali'i) were known to snare and hunt ʻalalā with poles.

ʻAlalā were also shot for sport by European colonizers. Though hunting native birds was illegal at the time, ʻalalā continued to be shot throughout the 1980s, according to conservationists.

=== Introduced predators ===
The ʻalalā's known extant natural predator is the 'io (Hawaiian hawk), a hawk species endemic to Hawaii.

Several mammal species introduced to Hawaii by humans are known to prey on ʻalalā eggs, nestlings, and fledglings. These include the roof rat (Rattus rattus), the small Indian mongoose, and feral cats, which have been known to attack nests, eat eggs, and kill young fledglings.

=== Introduced diseases ===
==== Avian malaria ====
Avian malaria is a parasitic disease of birds, caused by Plasmodium relictum, a protozoan parasite passed to birds via mosquitoes of the species Culex quinquefasciatus, which was introduced to the Hawaiian islands in 1826. Though this disease appears in many passerine birds without much population impact, many isolated bird populations show significant mortality when introduced to this parasite, including native Hawaiian birds. Many Hawaiian bird species have shown precipitous population declines which are thought to be due to avian malaria. Though there is no direct evidence implicating avian malaria in the decline of the ʻalalā, they are vulnerable to the disease. Seven captive ʻalalā, housed in outdoor aviaries, were naturally infected with avian malaria over the course of a seven-week study, and two of those infected showed clinical signs of the illness.

==== Avian pox ====
Avian pox is an infection caused by viruses in the genus Avipoxvirus. Infection causes tumor-like lesions on the exposed skin of the legs and feet and in and around the beak, trachea, and esophagus. Avian pox is also spread by mosquitos, and through contact with infected birds or objects. In experimental studies on other native Hawaiian birds, avian pox has been shown to cause large lesions, which often become infected, leading to tissue necrosis. Infections can sometimes lead to death. ʻAlalā have been known to become infected with avian pox, including during reintroduction efforts, but the role, if any, of the disease in their decline is unknown.

==== Toxoplasmosis ====
Toxoplasmosis is a disease caused by the protozoan Toxoplasma gondii. It is spread by domestic cats, who can transmit eggs and parasites to practically every known warm-blooded vertebrate, including birds, in their feces. Though toxoplasmosis rarely causes disease and death in infected animals, infection was diagnosed in five reintroduced ʻalalā in 1998–1999. One presented with clinical signs and was successfully treated, three appeared to have died from the disease, and one was diagnosed but did not appear to show clinical signs of the disease. During reintroduction efforts between 2016–2020, several birds showed evidence in blood samples that they had had prior toxoplasmosis infections, though no birds tested positive for active infections. Cats are not native to the Hawaiian islands, and ʻalalā are therefore naive hosts to the parasite; this is often associated with higher virulence and susceptibility. Whether or not toxoplasmosis has contributed to historic declines of ʻalalā is unknown; however, it has been a consideration in conservation efforts for the species.

== Status and conservation ==
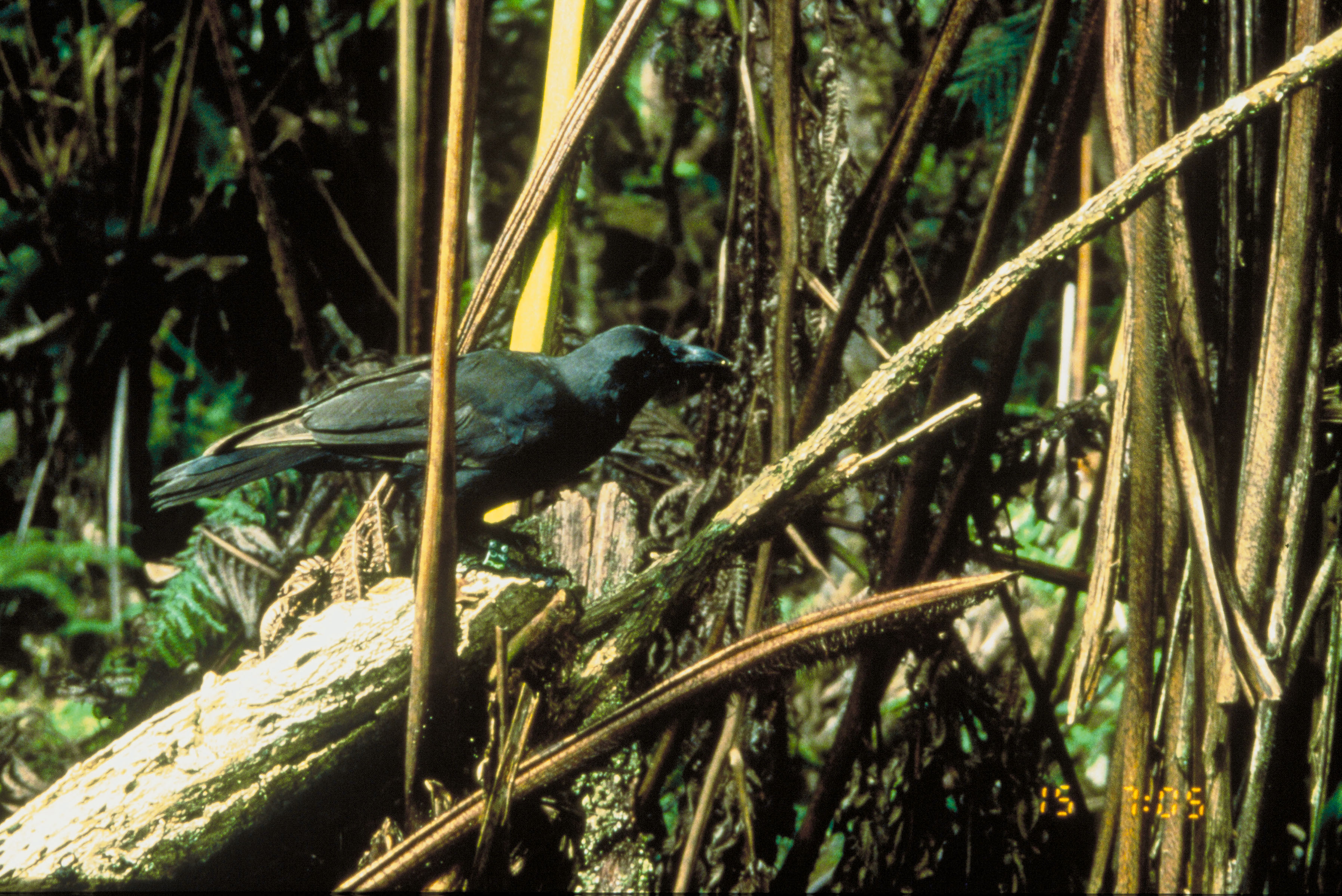
The Hawaiian crow has been extinct in the wild since 2002.

The Hawaiian crow is the most endangered corvid species in the world and the only corvid species left in Hawaii. Like other critically endangered species, harming the Hawaiian crow is illegal under U.S. federal law. By 1994, the overall population had dwindled to 31 individuals; 8 to 12 were wild and 19 held in captivity. The only wild-born juvenile produced between 1992–2003 was last seen in 1997. The last two known wild individuals of the Hawaiian crow disappeared in 2002, and the species is now classified as Extinct in the Wild by the IUCN Red List. Some 115 individuals remain (as of August 2014) in two captive breeding facilities operated by the San Diego Zoo. Attempts to reintroduce captive-bred birds into the wild have been hampered by predation by the Hawaiian hawk (Buteo solitarius), which itself is listed as Near Threatened. Breeding efforts have also been complicated due to extensive inbreeding during the crow's population decline.

=== Protection ===
The ʻalalā has been legally protected by the state of Hawaii since 1931 and was recognized as federally endangered in 1967. Sites on the slopes of Mauna Loa and other natural ranges have been set aside for habitat reconstruction and native bird recovery since the 1990s. The Kūlani Keauhou area has been ranked the best spot for the crows, parts of which have been fenced and ungulate-free for 20 years, helping tremendously for habitat recovery.

==== Captive breeding efforts ====
The first ʻalalā to be brought into captivity were two fledglings infected with avian pox in the wild in 1970 so they could receive treatment. By 1981, 12 individuals had been brought into captivity due to concerns about the viability of the wild population; 10 were housed in an endangered species breeding facility on Hawaii island. In 1986, the remaining captive ʻalalā were transferred to a breeding facility on Maui. In 1996, a new captive breeding facility was completed near Volcano on Hawaii- the captive population of ʻalalā was thereafter split between these two sites. In 2000, management of both captive breeding centers was taken over by San Diego Zoo Wildlife Alliance.

Initially, a majority of efforts to breed ʻalalā proved unsuccessful. Between 1979 and 1991, 33 unbroken, fertile eggs were produced in captivity, but only 8 chicks hatched. Difficulties with artificial incubation, issues with males disturbing nesting females, and problems associated with inbreeding, are all thought to have contributed to this low number. Because few chicks were produced each year and to prevent harm to the chicks from inept parents, birds were sometimes hand-reared without any siblings nearby. These individuals grew up to exhibit more stereotypies, a negative indicator for breeding success and fitness for release in the wild.

Over time, captive breeding has become more successful; the captive population increased from 24 in 1999 to more than 100 in 2012 with improved incubation, housing, and hand-rearing techniques. With more birds in the population, practitioners are now focused on increasing the population while simultaneously producing offspring more suited to release into the wild. This is achieved by socializing breeding pairs to encourage strong pair bonding, providing options of nest-building locations and materials, encouraging females to incubate eggs to hatch, and allowing parents to rear their own chicks to adulthood. Experimentation with allowing adults to incubate and rear their own chicks began in 2011, and by 2023, 17% of the living population was the product of full parent-rearing.

==== Reintroduction ====
There have been multiple attempted reintroductions of the ʻalalā.

Between 1993 and 1998, 27 juvenile ʻalalā, from eggs of both wild and captive origin, were raised in captivity and released on South Kona, Hawaii, near the remaining wild population. 21 of the 27 released birds died over the course of the program, many before reaching sexual maturity. The mortality rate of the reintroduced population was about twice that of the wild population at the time. The cause of death was determined for 13 of the 21 deceased birds- 7 were killed by Hawaiian hawks ('io), 3 died of toxoplasmosis infection, 2 died of other infections, and 1 was killed by nonnative mammal predation. In 1998 and 1999, the remaining 6 birds were recaptured and reintegrated into the captive flock.

In December 2016, 5 young ʻalalā were released into the Pu'u Maka'ala Natural Area Reserve on the eastern side of the island of Hawai'i. By mid-January, 3 birds had been found dead and the remaining 2 were returned to captivity. Necropsies found that 2 of the deaths were likely due to predation by the Hawaiian hawk and 1 was due to natural circumstances stemming from poor body condition.

A program of improved predator training was implemented in response to the previous deaths, and between 2017–2019, 27 young ʻalalā were released in the Pu'u Maka'ala Natural Area Reserve in 3 separate release cohorts. Though all birds released in 2017 and 2018 survived for over a year, birds released in 2019 survived for a shorter period- most died within 5 months of their release. Accelerating mortality into 2020 caused practitioners to recapture and return 5 surviving ʻalalā to captivity. 7 deaths were likely caused by Hawaiian hawk predation, 3 from poor condition, 2 by intraspecific aggression, and 1 by nonnative mammal predation.

In contrast to the reintroduction efforts during the 1990s, some birds released in the 2010s showed breeding behavior in the wild, though it was ultimately unsuccessful. In May 2019, one pair built a nest, laid eggs inside, and incubated them. However, the eggs never hatched and were presumed infertile. Another pair exhibited nest-building behavior, but did not succeed in building a full nest.

As of February 2024, plans are underway to release ʻalalā on Maui, aiming for releases to begin in spring of 2024. Although ʻalalā were known historically to exist only on the island of Hawaii, subfossil evidence has shown that ʻalalā were found on Maui as recently as when humans began occupying the Hawaiian Islands. Because Maui has a similar landscape and plants to Hawaii but does not have any Hawaiian hawks, it is thought that ʻalalā may be able to survive on Maui without a threat which caused the majority of deaths in prior reintroductions.

On December 4, 2024, two females and three males were reintroduced to Maui.

== Cultural significance ==
The Hawaiian crow is a significant symbol in Hawaiian mythology. It is said to lead souls to their final resting place on the cliffs of Ka Lae, the southernmost tip on the Big Island of Hawaii. Native priests named the ʻalalā so during prayer and chants due to its distinctive call.
