= Mothers and Sons =

Mothers and Sons may refer to:

- Mothers and Sons (book), a 2006 collection of short stories by Colm Tóibín
- Mothers and Sons (play), a 2014 play by Terrence McNally

== See also ==
- Mother and Son (disambiguation)
