= Hawaii Five-0 (2010 TV series) season 7 =

Season of the American television series

Hawaii Five-0
- Season 7
- Season 7 U.S. DVD cover
- Showrunners: Peter M. Lenkov; Eric Guggenheim
- Starring: Alex O'Loughlin; Scott Caan; Daniel Dae Kim; Grace Park; Masi Oka; Chi McBride; Jorge Garcia
- No. of episodes: 25

Release
- Original network: CBS
- Original release: September 23, 2016 – May 12, 2017

Season chronology
- ← Previous; Season 6 Next → Season 8

The seventh season of the CBS police procedural drama series Hawaii Five-0 premiered on Friday September 23, 2016, and concluded on May 12, 2017. The season contained 25 episodes, and the series's 150th episode. For the 2016–17 U.S. television season, the seventh season of Hawaii Five-0 ranked #15 with an average of 12.15 million viewers, and in the 18–49 demographic ranked 43rd with a 1.8/7 Rating/Share.

This season also marks the final appearances of Daniel Dae Kim, Grace Park, and Masi Oka as Chin Ho Kelly, Kono Kalakaua, and Max Bergman respectively.

== Cast and characters ==
=== Main cast ===
- Alex O'Loughlin as Lieutenant Commander Steven "Steve" McGarrett, United States Navy Reserve
- Scott Caan as Detective Daniel "Danny" "Danno" Williams
- Daniel Dae Kim as Lieutenant Chin Ho Kelly
- Grace Park as Officer Kono Kalakaua
- Masi Oka as Dr. Max Bergman, Chief Medical Examiner (episodes 1–13)
- Chi McBride as Captain Lou Grover
- Jorge Garcia as Jerry Ortega

=== Recurring ===
- Claire Forlani as Alicia Brown
- Julie Benz as Detective Abigail "Abby" Dunn, Honolulu Police Department
- Taylor Wily as Kamekona Tuopola
- Andrew Lawrence as Eric Russo
- Rosalind Chao as Keiko Mahoe, Governor of Hawaii
- Dennis Chun as Sgt. Duke Lukela
- Londyn Silzer as Sarah Waincroft Diaz
- Kimee Balmilero as Dr. Noelani Cunha
- Shawn Mokuahi Gurnett as Shawn "Flippa" Tuopola
- Teilor Grubbs as Grace Williams
- Zach Sulzbach as Charlie Williams
- Chosen Jacobs as Will Grover
- Duane "Dog" Chapman as himself
- Al Harrington as Mamo Kahike
- Melanie Griffith as Clara Williams, Danny's mother
- Ian Anthony Dale as Adam Noshimuri
- Willie Garson as Gerard Hirsch
- Sarah Carter as Lynn Downey
- Lili Simmons as Melissa Armstrong
- Elisabeth Röhm as Dr. Madison Gray
- Kekoa Kekumano as Nahele Huikala
- Shawn Thomsen as Officer Pua

=== Guest stars ===
- Christine Lahti as Doris McGarrett
- Michelle Borth as Catherine Rollins
- Jack Lord as Steve McGarrett (voiced by Cam Clarke, body double Ken Matepi)
- Traci Togucha as Ailana Read, Child Social Services
- Faran Tahir as Lucky Morad
- Jennifer Jalene as Alex Aukai
- Chris Vance as Harry Langford
- Jon Abrahams as Ben Halanu
- Kanya Sesser as Rosey Valera
- Victor Ortiz as Juan Diego
- Missy Peregrym as Bridget Williams, Danny's sister
- Maximiliano Hernández as Agent Navarro
- Felix Solis as Jorge Moralez
- Jimmy Buffett as Frank Bama
- Adrian R'Mante as Alan Mayfield
- Max Gail as Bill Walker
- Samm Levine as Jeremy Holden
- Rob Huebel as Blake Stone
- Will Yun Lee as Sang Min Sooh
- Darius Rucker as Desmond Abati
- Mackenzie Aladjem as Moani Amosa
- Brandon Keener as Emilio
- Robert Gant as Thomas Stratham
- William Forsythe as Harry Brown
- Michelle Krusiec as Michelle Shioma
- Hal Holbrook as Leonard Patterson
- Michael Paul Chan as Captain Tanaka, HPD (Ret.)
- Dylan Bruno as Lee Campbell, head of Paladin Security
- Claire van der Boom as Rachel Hollander

== Episodes ==
| No. overall | No. in season | Title | Directed by | Written by | Original release date | Prod. code | U.S. viewers (millions) |
|---|---|---|---|---|---|---|---|
| 144 | 1 | "Makaukau 'oe e Pa'ani?" "Ready to Play?" | Bryan Spicer | Peter M. Lenkov & Eric Guggenheim | September 23, 2016 | 701 | 10.22 |
As Steve McGarrett (Alex O'Loughlin) and Danny Williams (Scott Caan) recover from their transplant, a vigilante begins killing serial killers and leaves their bodies on Five-0 property with ivory chess pieces in their mouths. The first is found inside Five-0 Headquarters at Iolani Palace, and the second is found inside Lou Grover's (Chi McBride) car. As Five-0 searches for the killer, Steve must help the new governor, Mahoe (Rosalind Chao) quell the fear that Oahu is no longer safe. Steve later comes home to find a chess piece in his house. Meanwhile, Chin Ho Kelly (Daniel Dae Kim) learns that Sara's aunt and uncle in Mexico are filing for adoption, and Chin starts contemplating fatherhood. This episode features a striking scene in the prologue: McGarrett visits the chapel within Tripler Army Medical Center and encounters an almost-ghostly appearing stranger with whom McGarrett strikes up conversation. The stranger obliquely references having worked for the Hawaii police many years earlier and when Steve begins doubting himself gives advice to McGarrett not to give up. The stranger deliberately resembles the original Steve McGarrett, Jack Lord, (including the voice) and is credited as Jack Lord in the episode's closing credits.
| 145 | 2 | "No Ke Ali'i Wahine A Me Ka 'Aina" "For Queen and Country" | Sylvain White | David Wolkove & Matt Wheeler | September 30, 2016 | 702 | 9.73 |
Following the events of "Makaukau 'oe e Pa'ani?", Steve and Danny visit retired FBI profiler Alicia Brown (Claire Forlani) to try and track down the mysterious vigilante. Alicia refuses to get involved, but is gradually roped in when Steve purposefully leaves the chess piece the killer left in his house. Meanwhile, a man steals diamonds from renowned billionaire Lucky Morad (Faran Tahir). The girl he used to smuggle the diamonds out of Morad's party is found dead the next morning. The team identifies the suspect as Harry Langford (Chris Vance), a rogue MI6 agent. Langford claims his going rogue was a cover, and he didn't kill the girl. He is tracking a contract bomber, El Hamadi, who bombed an embassy in Madrid in 2012 and is planning to use a cyber key known as the Greystone to plan a larger attack. Steve and Danny go with Langford to Prague to capture Hamadi's contact.
| 146 | 3 | "He Moho Hou" "New Player" | Bryan Spicer | Peter M. Lenkov & Cyrus Nowrasteh | October 7, 2016 | 703 | 9.65 |
Alicia awakens in her bed to find another body with a chess piece in his mouth beside her. Forced to accept she's now a part of the case, she officially joins Steve and Danny with the investigation. Alicia discovers that the detective who was investigating the three serial killers was actually murdered. At the end, Steve and Alicia visit the police psychologist, Dr. Madison Gray (Elisabeth Röhm), who Detective Lau was seeing before he was killed, and discover she has a book entitled History of Medieval Chess, implying that she's the serial killer. Meanwhile, the team hunts for a cartel boss whose soldiers are gunning for him. Kono reconnects with Rosey, an old surfing rival whose legs were amputated after she drove over an IED in Iraq.
| 147 | 4 | "Hu a'e ke ahi lanakila a Kamaile" "The Fire of Kamile Rises in Triumph" | Bronwen Hughes | Peter M. Lenkov & Cyrus Nowrasteh | October 14, 2016 | 704 | 9.19 |
Following their meeting with Dr. Gray, Alicia is convinced that she is the killer, but Steve is more wary. Against his orders, Alicia breaks into Dr. Gray's house and finds a chessboard with pieces missing identical to the pieces found with the serial killers. Steve arrives and is stabbed by Dr. Gray, who has already captured Alicia. While Steve drifts in and out of consciousness, Alicia and Dr. Gray play mind games with one another, revealing that Alicia's daughter was pushed into a career in the FBI by her and was subsequently killed by a serial killer, and that Dr. Gray's father sexually abused her as a child while forcing her to play chess. Eventually, Dr. Gray leaves and two infamous serial killers, Donald and Mallory Witten (Danny Michael Mann & Lauren Letherer), take Steve and Alicia to a rocky outcrop, and throw them into a hole that the tide fills up. The rest of Five-0 begin searching for them, and Lou deduces that Dr. Gray is behind everything. Elsewhere, Jerry reports to Chin that a possible red flag may have come up with Sara's aunt and uncle, so Chin turns to Robert Coughlin (Ingo Rademacher) to run background. Lou, Steve, and Jerry discover Steve's torched Silverado, done by Dr. Gray who then disappeared. Lou meets his football hero, Otis Wilson of the 1985 Chicago Bears.
| 148 | 5 | "Ke Ku 'Ana" "The Stand" | Bobby Roth | Jason Gavin & Derek Santos Olson | October 21, 2016 | 705 | 9.51 |
The Five-0 task force investigate a bulletproof bulldozer that crashed into a gun range and stole all the inventory. Later on, the suspect (Brent Sexton) instigates a hostage situation and demands to be put on the news to protest gun violence and it is up to McGarrett and Danny to talk him down. It is revealed that the suspect's son was the perpetrator in a Virginia shooting that killed eight people. Elsewhere, Adam is released from prison after spending a year and asks Kono's help to track down a fellow inmate's daughter to make up with him.
| 149 | 6 | "Ka hale ho'okauwel" "House of Horrors" | Ron Underwood | David Wolkove & Matt Wheeler | October 28, 2016 | 706 | 8.50 |
A psychic is apparently scared to death on Halloween, so Five-0 investigates. Danny and Eric discover that the psychic's claims ruined a lot of lives. Max finds a second victim, revealed to be an accomplice to the killer, the psychic's assistant who killed the psychic and the accomplice. Max (Masi Oka) returns from Africa and reveals he married his girlfriend Sabrina. Meanwhile, Jerry babysits a grounded Grace and Charlie, which proves to be a challenge when Grace's sour attitude spoils Jerry and Charlie's anticipated trick-or-treating. Elsewhere, Adam and Kono are kidnapped by a death cult, and are forced to escape with another victim through the woods to an abandoned house.
| 150 | 7 | "Ka Makuahine A Me Ke Keikikane" "Mother and Son" | Bryan Spicer | Eric Guggenheim & David Wolkove | November 4, 2016 | 707 | 9.48 |
McGarrett's date with Lynn (Sarah Carter) is interrupted when he receives a surprise visit from Catherine Rollins (Michelle Borth), who informs him that his mother Doris (Christine Lahti) has been captured by the CIA in Morocco after her mission to free Wo Fat's father (George Cheung) went sideways. McGarrett reluctantly goes to her aid, upset on the way she has disappeared the past few years. Chin, Kono, and Lou all go along to help him out. Meanwhile, Chin loses his appeal to keep Sara and is forced to let her move to Mexico to live with her aunt and uncle. Elsewhere, as a favor to Danny, Lou recruits his son Will to figure out who Grace is seeing, not knowing Will is her boyfriend.
| 151 | 8 | "Hana Komo Pae" "Rite of Passage" | Brad Tanenbaum | Rob Hanning | November 11, 2016 | 708 | 9.84 |
Danny chaperones Grace's (Teilor Grubbs) Winter Formal, which turns deadly when an al-Qaeda splinter group storms the event looking to capture one of Will's classmates named Jeremy Ramos (Max Tepper), the son of a High Ranking Diplomat (Clint Jung), in hopes of leveraging a trade for their captured leader. Danny reluctantly must work with Will (Chosen Jacobs), whom he has just learned is Grace's boyfriend, to save everyone. Meanwhile, Steve hosts a poker game.
| 152 | 9 | "Elua la ma Nowemapa" "Two Days in November" | Maja Vrvilo | Sean Farina | November 18, 2016 | 709 | 10.09 |
A conspiracy theorist and a friend of Jerry's is murdered after having discovered new information about the assassination of John F. Kennedy and the mystery behind it, that tells that JFK's cabinet had planned the assassination. Five-0 soon discover that there were more people behind the assassination than first thought. This later leads to Jerry telling the story of the Honolulu conference that took place on November 20, 1963. Meanwhile, Lou begins to have doubts about his son Will dating Danny's daughter Grace.
| 153 | 10 | "Ka Luhi" "The Burden" | Carlos Bernard | Helen Shang & Zoe Robyn | December 9, 2016 | 710 | 9.40 |
Five-0 investigates a 10-year-old cold case of a missing teenager when a boy, (Joey Luthman) who is suffering from PTSD undergoes hypnosis and afterwards, realizes he might have been a witness to the missing teen's murder. Meanwhile, Danny's sister Bridget (Missy Peregrym) comes to visit Oahu for a business conference. Not long after, Danny begins to suspect that she is getting a little "too close" to one of her co-workers.
| 154 | 11 | "Ka'ili Aku" "Snatchback" | Jennifer Lynch | Matt Wheeler | December 16, 2016 | 711 | 9.46 |
It's Christmas time and Five-0 celebrates Chin's birthday until he receives a call that his niece Sara has been kidnapped in Mexico by the Diego drug cartel. While trying to rescue Sara, the team finds out that this was a revenge kidnap plan towards Five-0. Later on, Chin takes the matter into his hands and surrenders himself to the cartel in order to get Sara back, leaving his life hanging in the balance.
| 155 | 12 | "Ka 'Aelike" "The Deal" | Joe Dante | David Wolkove & Matt Wheeler | January 6, 2017 | 712 | 10.10 |
After Chin is kidnapped by the Diego drug cartel, Five-0 race against the clock to rescue him from being executed. Later on, Sara's aunt and uncle suggest that Sara live with Chin due to the dangerous circumstances in Mexico, which he accepts. The episode transitions to a case involving murder which prompts Lou to go undercover as a car salesman. Meanwhile, McGarrett suspects that Max might leave Hawaii when he mentions possible coroner replacements and selling his house which leads to Max confiding to McGarrett that he is moving to Africa with Sabrina.
| 156 | 13 | "Ua ho'i ka 'opua i Awalua" "The Clouds Always Return to Awalua" | Jim Jost | Cyrus Nowrasteh | January 13, 2017 | 713 | 9.69 |
Max begins to pack up his belongings with Jerry and begins to reminisce various times with Five-0 and his life in Hawaii. Five-0 also has a farewell party for Max. Meanwhile, the team investigates the murder of a police officer found at a building explosion site. Note: This is the last episode to feature Masi Oka as a main cast member
| 157 | 14 | "Ka laina ma ke one" "Line in the Sand" | Peter Weller | Sean O'Reilly | January 20, 2017 | 714 | 8.42 |
Five-0 is dealt with an overbearing U.S. Marshall (guest star Lou Diamond Phillips) when they try to capture a person suspected in a murder investigation who crossed over the border to seek asylum on sacred land. Meanwhile, McGarrett takes a road test after his drivers license expired over 7 years ago.
| 158 | 15 | "Ka Pa'ani Nui" "Big Game" | Bryan Spicer | Helen Shang | February 3, 2017 | 715 | 9.81 |
Five-0 investigates the murder of a diver who was suspected of doing illegal shark finning. They soon discover that the murder suspect is a former Nazi criminal when they discover that the victim has a tattoo symbolizing a holocaust concentration camp. Meanwhile, Kamekona attempts to enlist Five-0's help to get rid of his workers who are protesting for better pay and benefits.
| 159 | 16 | "Poniu I Ke Aloha" "Crazy in Love" | Jerry Levine | David Wolkove & Matt Wheeler | February 10, 2017 | 716 | 9.86 |
It's Valentine's Day and McGarrett treats his girlfriend Lynn to a romantic getaway. To his surprise, Danny also is on the same getaway with his girlfriend Melissa at the same hotel and they decide to have a joint vacation. Things take a crazy turn when Danny loses his sunglasses and suspects a kid he antagonized on the beach. Meanwhile, Kono, Chin and Lou investigate a man murdered at a local nightclub after he took a class on how to pick up women.
| 160 | 17 | "Hahai i na pilikua nui" "Hunting Monsters" | Roderick Davis | Rob Hanning | February 17, 2017 | 717 | 9.62 |
Alicia Brown gets baited when Dr. Madison Gray surrenders into HPD, under the alias Lauren Parker, with blood on her hands seemingly belonging to Brown. While the team does not believe that "Parker" has Dissociative Identity Disorder, Gray manages to get Alicia to break her out of jail, intent on killing both her and Sienna, her supposedly dead daughter to finish off the job. In the end, Gray confronts Alicia at the latter's home. Meanwhile, Kamakona and Flippa open up a second food truck that Kamakona does not approve of.
| 161 | 18 | "E Malama Pono" "Handle with Care" | Eagle Egilsson | Zoe Robyn | February 24, 2017 | 718 | 9.12 |
Sang Min tells McGarrett useful intelligence in finding the missing Uranium. After being kidnapped while investigating, henchmen set off the bomb and it's up to McGarrett and Danny to deactivate it. Meanwhile, Danny reveals to McGarrett that he is considering retiring from the police force and opening a restaurant.
| 162 | 19 | "Puka 'ana" "Exodus" | Bronwen Hughes | Eric Guggenheim | March 10, 2017 | 719 | 9.20 |
McGarrett and Kono investigate the disappearance of a young girl who is suspected of being a victim of a sex trafficking ring, which sends an infuriated Kono on a personal mission to track down the people responsible. Meanwhile, Chin and Lou investigate the murder of a member of a sober relief facility. Danny visits his sister in New Jersey.
| 163 | 20 | "Huikau Na Makau A Ka Lawai'a" "The Fishhooks of the Fishers become Entangled" | Jerry Levine | Matt Wheeler | March 31, 2017 | 720 | 8.74 |
Five-0 reunites with Private Intestigator Harry Brown (guest star William Forsythe) and help him investigate the kidnapping of the wife of a wealthy businessman who is holding a secret deeper than what he is explaining. Meanwhile, Danny's ex-wife Rachel (guest star Claire van der Boom) drops a bombshell saying that she is getting a divorce from Stan and wants Danny's help on how to tell the kids.
| 164 | 21 | "Ua Malo'o Ka Wai" "The Water Is Dried Up" | Eagle Egilsson | Peter M. Lenkov & Eric Guggenheim | April 7, 2017 | 721 | 8.77 |
While investigating the deaths of ship boat Captains, McGarrett and Five-0 are captured by Michelle Shioma and her criminal empire and are faced with death. With fearing something terrible happening, Jerry recruits the HPD to rescue them. As a thanks, Steve finally awards Jerry a badge. Meanwhile, Grover and his son travel to Chicago so Grover could testify against a string of dirty cops, and Grover learns the social consequences of turning on Clay Maxwell.
| 165 | 22 | "Waimaka 'Ele'ele" "Black Tears" | Bryan Spicer | David Wolkove | April 14, 2017 | 722 | 8.49 |
Five-0 investigates the death of one of the last survivors of the World War II USS Arizona (BB-39) tragedy, a veteran who was killed in a hit-and-run automobile accident. McGarrett soon discovers that the victim had connections to his grandfather, Ensign Steven McGarrett, who had served with the victim on the Arizona, and makes his best effort to catch the people responsible. Meanwhile, Adam starts a new job in construction and asks for Jerry's help when he finds a bone fragment and thinks it might be a burial site.
| 166 | 23 | "Wehe 'ana" "Prelude" | Maja Vrvilo | Helen Shang & Zoe Robyn | April 28, 2017 | 723 | 8.06 |
Danny must protect a comatose witness from his last HPD case from seven years ago alongside his old HPD precinct boss, Captain Tanaka (Ret.), while Steve and Five-0 race to save their lives after discovering that the hit was ordered by the Ochoa cartel from season 1. Flashbacks reveal the details of the case, including the fact that after losing the witness, Danny was put onto the John McGarrett murder case, leading to his meeting with Steve.
| 167 | 24 | "He ke'u na ka 'alae a Hin" "A Croaking by Hina's Mudhen" | Krishna Rao | Rob Hanning | May 5, 2017 | 725 | 8.01 |
When McGarrett receives word about a major terrorist attack on Hawaii from an ex-terrorist he captured 10 years ago, the Five-0 team is reluctant to believe him. Kono and Adam help Gerard Hirsch (guest star Willie Garson) in his efforts to expand his crime scene cleaning business. Chin receives an offer to run a task force like Five-0, in San Francisco and struggles with the decision - ultimately accepting the offer and will take Abby and Sara with him.
| 168 | 25 | "Ua Mau Ke Ea O Ka Aina I Ka Pono" "The Life of the Land Is Perpetuated in Righteousness" | Bryan Spicer | Peter M. Lenkov & Eric Guggenheim | May 12, 2017 | 724 | 8.22 |
The Five-0 team works with HPD to stop a sex-trafficking ring from shipping girls off the island. McGarret devises a plan that no one believes they can pull off and the team discovers that the ring has vast reaches on the mainland. Kono makes a decision to join a multi-agency task force combating sex trafficking in Carson City, Nevada. note: This is the final appearances of Daniel Dae Kim & Grace Park as series regulars

== Production ==
On March 25, 2016, the series was renewed for a seventh season. On July 6, 2016, production began on the seventh season with a Traditional Hawaiian Blessing.

In episode seven, Doris tells Steve about a lock box she had hidden in the house for Steve (and Mary) to look at for more background knowledge about her. She tells him the combination is "090268" in order to open it. The number is the actual date of the premiere of the original TV series.

=== Masi Oka's departure ===
On November 17, 2016, it was announced that Oka would be leaving the series after the thirteenth episode.

== Reception ==
=== Ratings ===
| № | Episode | Air date | 18-49 rating | Viewers (millions) | Weekly rank | Live+7 18-49 | Live+7 viewers (millions) |
|---|---|---|---|---|---|---|---|
| 1 | "Makaukau 'ce e Pa'ani?" | September 23, 2016 | 1.4 | 10.22 | #17 | N/A | 13.45 |
| 2 | "No Ke Ali'i' Wahine A Me Ka Aina" | September 30, 2016 | 1.3 | 9.73 | #16 | N/A | 12.76 |
| 3 | "He Moho Hou" | October 7, 2016 | 1.3 | 9.65 | #11 | N/A | 12.64 |
| 4 | "Hu a'e ke ahi lanakila a Kamaile" | October 14, 2016 | 1.2 | 9.19 | #16 | N/A | 12.00 |
| 5 | "Ke Ku 'Ana" | October 21, 2016 | 1.2 | 9.51 | #14 | N/A | 12.15 |
| 6 | "Ka Hale Ho'oakuweli" | October 28, 2016 | 1.0 | 8.50 | #22 | N/A | 11.31 |
| 7 | "Ka makuahine a me ke keikikane" | November 4, 2016 | 1.2 | 9.48 | #13 | 1.8 | 12.21 |
| 8 | "Hana Komo Pae" | November 11, 2016 | 1.4 | 9.84 | #11 | N/A | 12.41 |
| 9 | "Elua la ma Nowemapa" | November 18, 2016 | 1.3 | 10.09 | #11 | 2.0 | 13.10 |
| 10 | "Ka Luhi" | December 9, 2016 | 1.2 | 9.40 | #13 | 1.8 | 12.53 |
| 11 | "Ka'ili Aku" | December 16, 2016 | 1.1 | 9.46 | #12 | 1.8 | 12.36 |
| 12 | "Ka 'Aelike" | January 6, 2017 | 1.3 | 10.10 | #8 | 2.0 | 13.21 |
| 13 | "Ua ho'i ka 'opua i Awalua" | January 13, 2017 | 1.2 | 9.69 | #7 | 1.9 | 12.76 |
| 14 | "Ka laina ma ke one" | January 20, 2017 | 1.0 | 8.42 | #12 | 1.7 | 11.35 |
| 15 | "Ka Pa'ani Nui" | February 3, 2017 | 1.1 | 9.81 | #6 | 1.9 | 12.95 |
| 16 | "Poniu I Ke Aloha" | February 10, 2017 | 1.3 | 9.86 | #6 | N/A | 12.83 |
| 17 | "Hahai i na pilikua nui" | February 17, 2017 | 1.2 | 9.62 | #7 | N/A | 12.39 |
| 18 | "E Malama Pono" | February 24, 2017 | 1.1 | 9.12 | #10 | 1.8 | 12.01 |
| 19 | "Puka 'ana" | March 10, 2017 | 1.1 | 9.20 | #11 | 1.7 | 12.23 |
| 20 | "Huikau Na Makau A Ka Lawai'a" | March 31, 2017 | 1.0 | 8.74 | #13 | 1.7 | 11.57 |
| 21 | "Ua Malo'o Ka Wai" | April 7, 2017 | 1.0 | 8.77 | #12 | 1.6 | 11.62 |
| 22 | "Waimaka 'Ele'ele" | April 14, 2017 | 1.0 | 8.49 | #7 | 1.6 | 11.31 |
| 23 | "Wehe 'ana" | April 28, 2017 | 0.9 | 8.06 | #10 | N/A | N/A |
| 24 | "He ke'u na ka 'alae a Hina" | May 5, 2017 | 0.9 | 8.01 | #14 | 1.6 | 11.04 |
| 25 | "Ua Mau Ke Ea O Ka Aina I Ka Pono" | May 12, 2017 | 1.0 | 8.22 | #12 | 1.7 | 11.00 |
