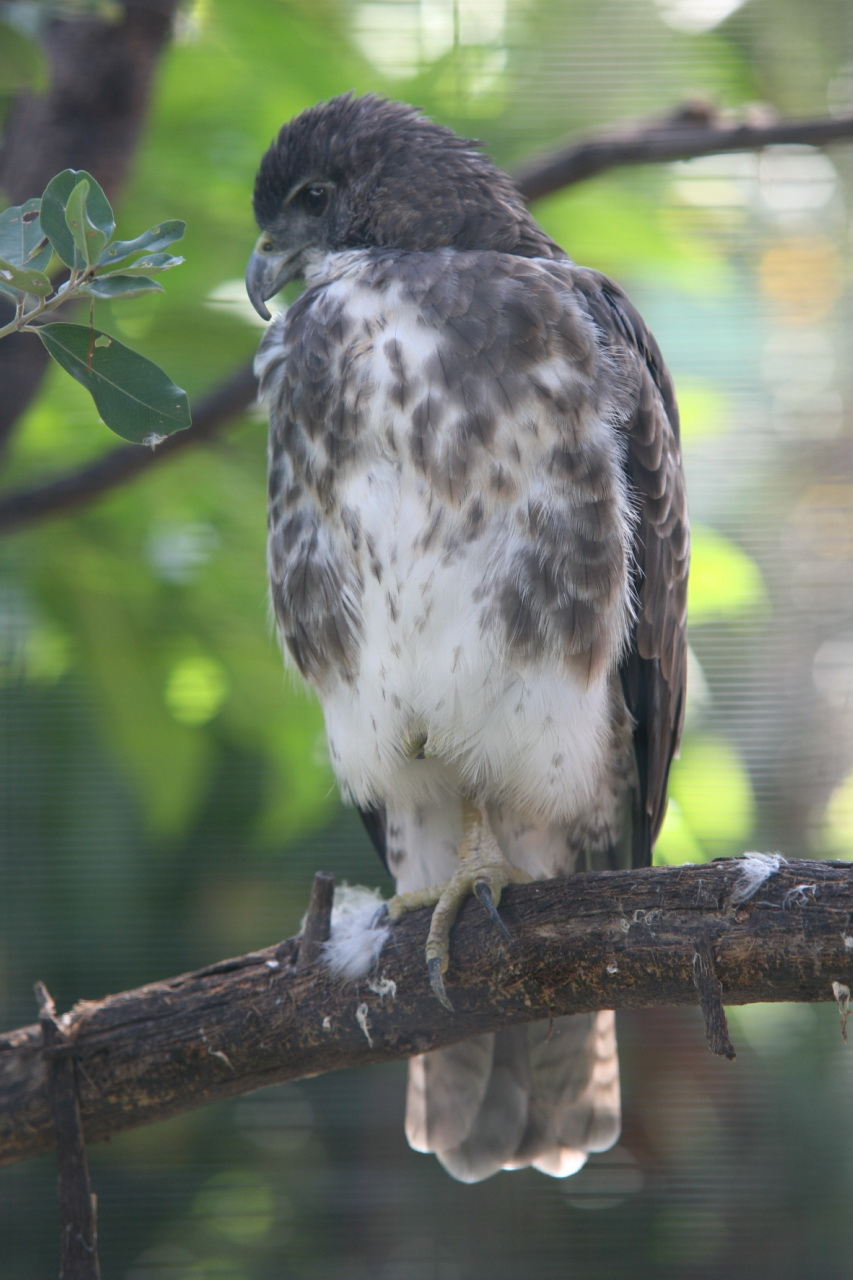
- At Honolulu Zoo, Hawaii

Conservation status
- Near Threatened (IUCN 3.1)

- Vulnerable (NatureServe)

Scientific classification
- Kingdom: Animalia
- Phylum: Chordata
- Class: Aves
- Order: Accipitriformes
- Family: Accipitridae
- Genus: Buteo
- Species: B. solitarius

Binomial name
- Buteo solitarius Peale, 1849

= Hawaiian hawk =

Species of bird

The Hawaiian hawk or ʻio (Buteo solitarius) is a raptor in the genus Buteo endemic to Hawaiʻi, currently restricted to the Big Island. The ʻio is one of two extant birds of prey that are native to Hawaiʻi, the other being the pueo (Hawaiian short-eared owl) and fossil evidence indicates that it inhabited the island of Hawaiʻi, Molokaʻi, Oʻahu, Maui and Kauaʻi at one time. Today, it is known to breed only on the Big Island, in stands of native ʻōhiʻa lehua (Metrosideros polymorpha) trees. The species was protected as an endangered species in the United States, but was delisted in 2020. However, the IUCN classifies the species as Near Threatened. NatureServe considers the species Vulnerable.

== Description ==
The Hawaiian hawk measures approximately 40 to 46 centimetres (16 to 18 in) in length. The female, which weighs 605 g (21.3 oz) on average, is larger than the male, which averages 441 g (15.6 oz). Two color phases exist: a dark phase (dark brown head, breast, and underwings), and a light color phase (dark head, light breast and light underwings). Feet and legs are yellowish in adults and greenish in juveniles. During breeding season one of the pair, possibly the female, has a distinctive yellow forecap area just above the upper mandible.

== Threats ==
Common threats to the ʻio are illegal shootings, the degradation of their native forest habitat, poisoning, vehicle collisions, starvation, and predation from other animals.

== Lifestyle ==
This solitary hawk remains in and defends its territories year round. They nest from March through September, and usually lay only one egg but sometimes they could lay up to three in their clutch. The female does the majority of sitting during the 38 days of incubation, while the male does the majority of the hunting. After the egg is hatched, the female only allows the male to visit when delivering food to the nest. The chick fledges at seven or eight weeks. Fifty to seventy percent of the nests successfully fledge young.

The ʻio usually hunts from a stationary position, but can also dive on prey from the air. Due to Hawaii having almost no native land mammals (the Hawaiian hoary bat being the only one), its original diet presumably consisted mainly of smaller birds such as the flightless ducks and rails that once inhabited Hawaii. Today it feeds largely on introduced animals such as rats, lizards, and game birds, as well as invertebrates such as insects. It will also feed on the Hawaiian crow, a Hawaiian bird which is extinct in the wild; the recovery of the crow is repeatedly impeded by ʻio predation. They are opportunistic predators and are versatile in their feeding habits. They have a shrill and high-pitched call much like their Hawaiian name: "eeeh-oh." They are very noisy during the breeding season. ʻIo are strong fliers.

== In Hawaiian culture ==
The Hawaiian hawk was one of many birds unleashed in the third period of creation (wā) mentioned in the Kumulipo. It was a royal symbol in Hawaiian legend, and it is sometimes called ʻiolani ("exalted hawk"), which was the name of Kamehameha IV and the ʻIolani Palace.
