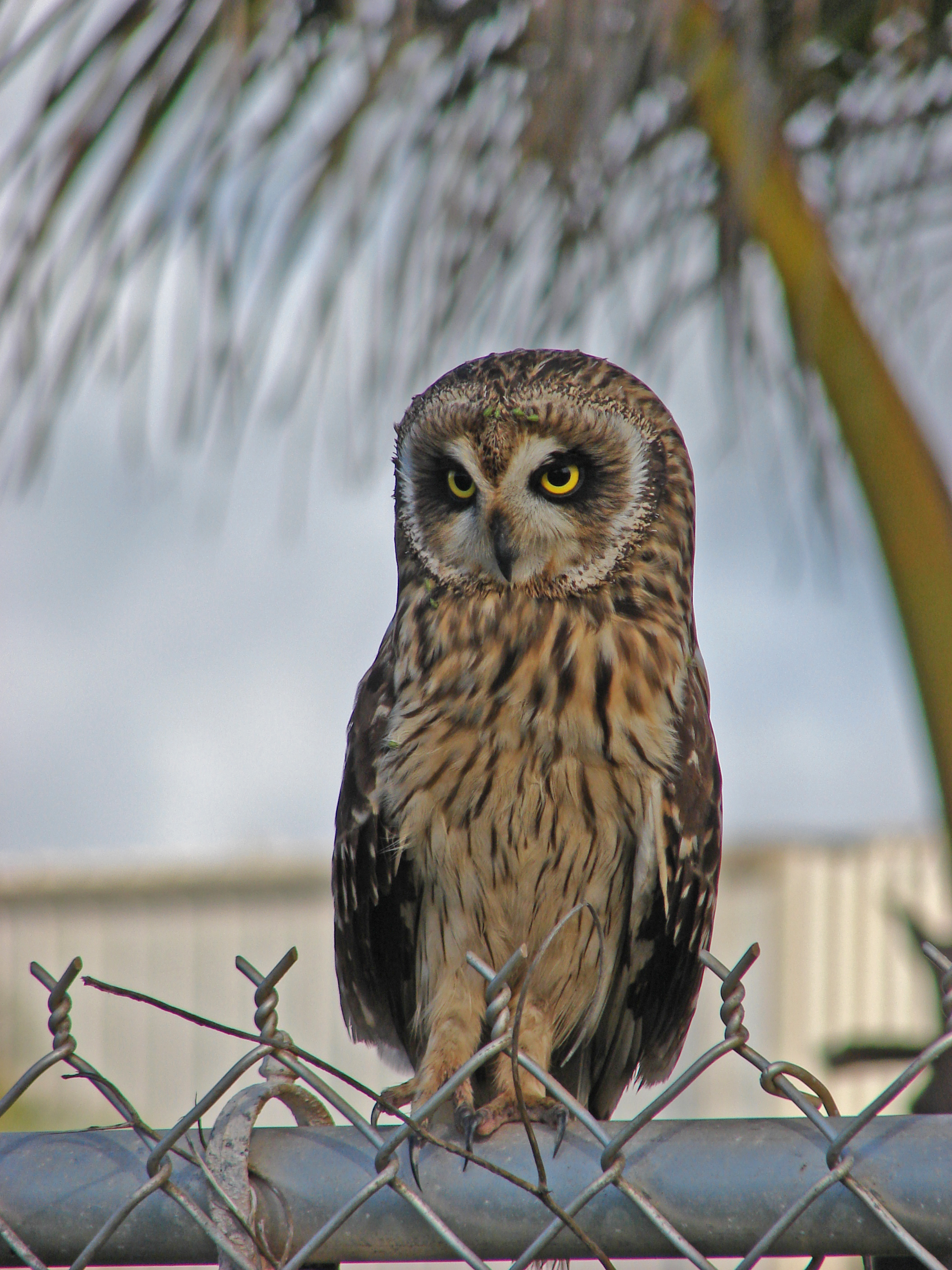

Conservation status
- Imperiled (NatureServe)

Scientific classification
- Kingdom: Animalia
- Phylum: Chordata
- Class: Aves
- Order: Strigiformes
- Family: Strigidae
- Genus: Asio
- Species: A. flammeus
- Subspecies: A. f. sandwichensis

Trinomial name
- Asio flammeus sandwichensis A. Bloxam, 1827

Synonyms
- Strix sandwichensis

= Pueo =

Subspecies of bird

The pueo (Asio flammeus sandwichensis) is a subspecies of the short-eared owl and is endemic to Hawaii. The pueo is one of the more famous of the various physical forms assumed by ʻaumākua (ancestor spirits) in Hawaiian culture.

== Symbols ==
The pueo (Asio flammeus sandwichensis) has many meanings across the Hawaiian Archipelago. Being an aumakua, Kanaka Maoli may see it as a symbol of protection for their families. In Native Hawaiian culture the Pueo can be seen as a source of guidance, appearing in times of danger; protecting people from distress. "ka pueo kani kaua" (The Owl that sings of war); The Pueo is mentioned in many different stories and chants. This quote comes from a chant for the god Pueo-Nui-Akea who was believed to bring life back to souls who wander around fields.

== Taxonomy ==
This taxon was first named by Andrew Bloxam (as the species Strix sandwichensis). He saw it, although did not collect a specimen, while in the Hawaiian Islands in 1825 as the naturalist on board HMS Blonde. It is now considered to be a subspecies of the short-eared owl, Asio flammeus, although Storrs Olson did not consider it to be distinct from Asio flammeus flammeus.

== Distribution and population ==
The pueo inhabits forests and grasslands throughout the Hawai’i archipelago. However, recent surveys suggest that their population is declining, specifically on Oʻahu, an island where they were once quite common. O’ahu is the most densely human-populated island, and the most consistently-developed area, in Hawai’i. Additionally, the island is also the location of the state capital (and largest city in Hawai’i). Thus, O’ahu is consequentially the most-visited part of Hawai’i by foreigners and tourists, as well—all factors that potentially affect the pueo’s natural range and behaviors. The pueo is recognized as an endemic subspecies of short-eared owl by the state of Hawai’i; on the island of O’ahu, the state currently lists it as an endangered species. Nevertheless, the pueo’s presence in Hawai’i is the result of prehistoric human activities, not solely natural evolution or avian migration, thus blurring the concept of a true native species. The pueo is thought to have somehow colonized Hawai’i after the arrival of the Polynesians. This relatively recent arrival of the pueo in Hawai’i may be linked to Polynesian rats (Rattus exulans), which were brought to the islands by humans. The only truly native land (non-aquatic) mammals in Hawai’i are two species of bat—the Hawaiian hoary bat and the (extinct) Synemporion keana. A further seven raptor species formerly inhabited prehistoric Hawai’i—the Hawaiian hawk, the wood harrier, the white-tailed eagle (or a very close relative of), and four species of stilt-owls.

Much like the related, continental short-eared owls, pueo primarily consume small mammals, which they can expertly detect from far distances with their large eyes, an adaptation for superb night vision and hunting after-dark. Their incredibly advanced nocturnal vision also enables them to fly through densely wooded areas with ease, deftly navigating between trees. Strigiformes (owls), as a whole, are well-known for flying silently, and without overly flapping their wings; this ensures their prey does not escape, as they cannot hear or suspect a predator approaching from above. As soon as a choice prey animal is spotted by the pueo, the owl intently glides-over and lands directly on top of it, killing it instantly before flying away, without a sound.

== Threats to survival ==
Pueo nest on the ground, which makes their eggs and young susceptible to predation by the introduced small Indian mongoose and other predators.

Pueo are strongly affected by light pollution. They are often killed in vehicular accidents in which they dive toward the headlights of cars, possibly in an attempt to hunt. Many such collisions have been reported on Interstate H-3 and other newly built roadways in areas which once held high populations of pueo.

Pueo appear to be somewhat resistant to the avian malaria that has devastated many other endemic bird populations in Hawaii; however, they have recently become victim to an unknown mysterious "sick owl syndrome", or SOS, in which large numbers of pueo have been found walking dazedly on roads, leading to death by collision. The cause of sick owl syndrome is unknown; it is suspected that pesticide toxicity may be responsible, particularly through secondary rodenticide poisoning. However, it has also been hypothesized that the cause may be an infectious agent, seizure-like confusion due to light pollution, or a variety of other causes.
