= Hawaii Five-0 (2010 TV series) season 6 =

Hawaii Five-0
- Season 6
- Season 6 U.S. DVD cover
- Showrunner: Peter M. Lenkov
- Starring: Alex O'Loughlin; Scott Caan; Daniel Dae Kim; Grace Park; Masi Oka; Chi McBride; Jorge Garcia
- No. of episodes: 25

Release
- Original network: CBS
- Original release: September 25, 2015 – May 13, 2016

Season chronology
- ← Previous; Season 5 Next → Season 7

The sixth season of the CBS police procedural drama series Hawaii Five-0 premiered on Friday, September 25, 2015, and concluded on May 13, 2016. It contained 25 episodes.

== Cast and characters ==
=== Main cast ===
- Alex O'Loughlin as Lieutenant Commander Steven "Steve" McGarrett, United States Navy Reserve and leader of the Five-O Task Force
- Scott Caan as Detective Sergeant Daniel "Danny" "Danno" Williams
- Daniel Dae Kim as Detective Lieutenant Chin Ho Kelly
- Grace Park as Officer Kono Kalakaua
- Masi Oka as Dr. Max Bergman, Chief Medical Examiner
- Chi McBride as Captain Lou Grover
- Jorge Garcia as Jerry Ortega, Special Consultant

=== Recurring ===
- Michelle Borth as Catherine Rollins
- Ian Anthony Dale as Adam Noshimuri
- Christopher Sean as Gabriel Waincroft
- Taylor Wily as Kamekona Tupuola
- Dennis Chun as HPD Sergeant Duke Lukela
- Teilor Grubbs as Grace Williams
- Shawn Mokuahi-Garnett as Shawn "Flippa" Tupuola
- Randy Couture as Jason Duclair
- Andrew Lawrence as Eric Russo
- Willie Garson as Gerard Hirsch
- Sarah Carter as Lynn Downey
- Julie Benz as SFPD Inspector Abby Dunn
- Taryn Manning as Mary Ann McGarrett
- Michael Imperioli as Odell Martin
- Will Yun Lee as Sang Min Sooh
- Kekoa Kekumano as Nahele Huikala
- Zach Sulzbach as Charlie Williams

=== Guest stars ===
- Carol Burnett as Aunt Deb McGarrett
- Michelle Pfeiffer as Mrs. Tom Samsly
- Sung Kang as Dae Wan
- Duane "Dog" Chapman as himself
- George Kee Cheung
- Londyn Silzer as Sara Waincroft Diaz
- Ziggy Marley as Bones

== Episodes ==
No. overall	No. in season	Title	Directed by	Written by	Original release date	Prod. code	U.S. viewers (millions)
119	1	"Mai ho`oni i ka wai lana mālie" "Do Not Disturb the Water That Is Tranquil"	Bryan Spicer	Peter M. Lenkov & Eric Guggenheim	September 25, 2015	601	8.30
While Kono Kalakaua (Grace Park) and Adam Noshimuri (Ian Anthony Dale) are away on their honeymoon, the remainder of Five-0 investigate the murder of a researcher who was investigating a piracy incident in Oahu in 1884, where artifacts were stolen from King Kalākaua that has since become a local legend. After the killer steals a painting from a museum, the only recovered artifact, he takes a hostage and disappears. It is revealed that the hostage and the killer are working together as modern day pirates. Steve McGarrett (Alex O'Loughlin) tells Danny (Scott Caan) that he is considering proposing to Catherine (Michelle Borth). Meanwhile, Gabriel Waincroft (Christopher Sean) holds Kono and Adam captive demanding Adam relinquish his assets. After Adam eventually gives in, he and Gabriel go to a bank. Kono manages to escape to stop Gabriel, but Gabriel wounds Adam to ensure his escape. With Adam's money gone, he has no means to pay the Yakuza to keep them alive.
120	2	"Lehu a Lehu" "Ashes to Ashes"	Sylvain White	John Dove	October 2, 2015	602	9.24
A bomb squad is attacked following a tip of a briefcase bomb. When another briefcase is left abandoned at a local news station, Five-0 discovers that it contains a flash drive containing a ransom to release serial arsonist Jason Duclair (Randy Couture) or another bomb will detonate. The bomb was set by Jason's believed protégé however it's later revealed he only wanted to kill Jason so he could have more fame. Meanwhile, Adam is released from the hospital and recovers with Kono, but they are quickly stalked by the Yakuza. Kono later confronts their car to see the gangsters dead.
121	3	"Ua 'o'oloku ke anu i na mauna" "The Chilling Storm Is on the Mountains"	Joe Dante	Story by : Peter M. Lenkov; Teleplay by : Steven Lilien & Bryan Wynbrandt	October 9, 2015	603	8.97
Diver and artist Ben Lahineha is found shot in the ocean while gathering lost objects on coral. Five-0 find that ballistics match the murder of a John Doe weeks before. Meanwhile, Danny gets his nephew Eric Russo (Andrew Lawrence) a job with the crime lab, and Jerry is given his own office in the basement. McGarrett prepares to propose to Catherine, but she dumps him with a lie.
122	4	"Ka Papahana Holo Pono" "Best Laid Plans"	Maja Vrvilo	Eric Guggenheim & David Wolkove	October 16, 2015	604	9.08
While Danny is recovering from a bone marrow transplant to his son, the rest of the team investigate the death of Harrison Crane (Keith A. Kirksey), a reclusive millionaire who disappeared 20 years ago, who was found in the jungle with Moesley's counterfeit money. Meanwhile, Adam is captured by Tom Bishop (Steve Bastoni) of the Yakuza and is forced to torture Aaron James for Gabriel Waincroft's location. When Aaron is revealed to not know anything, Bishop executes him.
123	5	"Ka 'alapahi nui" "Big Lie"	Eagle Egilsson	David Wolkove & Sue Palmer	October 23, 2015	605	8.60
Lawyer Kevin Harper is killed in front of his wife and daughter by a hitman riding a motorcycle during a deposition looking into his embezzlement of company funds. Harper was ready to admit that he embezzled money to pay for protection money for the Samoan mafia, and the team believe they were silencing him. Meanwhile, McGarrett receives a mysterious phone call from an unknown location, thinking it might be Catherine. Also, the team enters in a Tough Mudder race.
124	6	"Na Pilikua Nui" "Monsters"	Joe Dante	Matt Wheeler	October 30, 2015	606	8.35
On Halloween, Five-0 investigate the discovery of a briefcase with a number of similar looking female corpses with missing body parts. The team suspect the killer to be Mark Sheppard (Michael Graziadei), an ex-con obsessed with the occult, and one of the victim's ex-boyfriend, but is ruled out when he is found attempting suicide. Meanwhile, a blood bank is robbed by a local gang while Jerry gives blood. Chin and Kono find the thieves took a rare blood type and start looking at pet clinics suspecting the thieves are hiding in one. Danny discovers that Grace went to a party in the North Shore and comes to pick her up.
125	7	"Na Kama Hele" "Day Trippers"	Hanelle Culpepper	Ken Solarz	November 6, 2015	607	8.85
McGarrett goes on a first date with Lynn (Sarah Carter), and they go exploring a small island together. After the two come across an abandoned plane in the jungle, they are ambushed by a gunman. After McGarrett subdues him, he and Lynn explore the plane to discover that it was a prison transport plane that held Dennis Logan (James C. Burns), a crime boss from Boston who was believed to have been killed in a plane crash four years ago. Meanwhile, Chin, Kono, and Grover attend a college football game where the star player Jesse Frontera (Jake Nutty) is lacking in his performance. A suspicious Chin soon discovers that Jesse is being forced to throw the game or his kidnapped father will be killed.
126	8	"Piko Pau 'iole" "The Artful Dodger"	Joel Surnow	Story by : Peter M. Lenkov; Teleplay by : Steven Lilien & Bryan Wynbrandt	November 13, 2015	608	8.47
San Francisco Police Department Inspector Abby Dunn (Julie Benz) works with Five-0 to learn and set up a similar task force in her city. The team investigate the murder of a con-woman and suspect her partner, Hank Weber (Kristoffer Polaha), who claims to be targeted as well. Five-0 work with him to catch the killer, but it is revealed to be a trap to let Hank install a virus on Five-0's tablet table. Hank eventually reveals that he was hired to do this by Gabriel Waincroft. Meanwhile, Adam is kidnapped by Tom Bishop to be escorted to Yakuza leader Goro Shioma (Akira Hirayama). Adam kills his captors and escapes, but is quickly recaptured and sent to Goro, where he learns that his debt has been paid, by Waincroft. Dismayed at the knowledge he killed two people for no reason, he turns himself into the police, with Kono witnessing his confession.
127	9	"Hana Keaka" "Charade"	Bobby Roth	Carmen Pilar Golden	November 20, 2015	609	9.10
The body of university professor Elliot Thomas is found being fed to pigs and Max determines he was shot. As Jerry is given the task to wait for the pigs to defecate the bullet, Danny and Eric are enlisted to go undercover as a stand-in professor and student respectively to find the killer. Meanwhile, Chin bonds with Inspector Dunn during her stay in Hawaii. Hank Weber is found dead. Kono tells the team that the prosecutors do not believe that Adam killed the two Yakuza members in self-defense and that he is willing to accept a two-year sentence. Also, Nahele (Kekoa Kekumano), a street kid under McGarrett's charge, learns his father has been released from prison and has recovered custody rights. Nahele reveals he does not want to return to his father, because as a child he witnessed his father murder a man.
128	10	"Ka Makau kaa kaua" "The Sweet Science"	Bryan Spicer	John Dove	December 11, 2015	610	8.13
Ben Nakano, brother of local boxer Luke Nakano (Lewis Tan), is found beaten to death on the day before Luke is to fight opponent Devon Haynes (Harold House Moore) for welterweight champion. The team suspect Juru Katsu (Kelemete Misipeka), a known associate of Gabriel Waincroft, who’s determined to take over the island’s criminal underworld by eliminating several crime bosses. Meanwhile, Adam and Kono spend the former's last day of freedom before he starts his 18-month sentence in Halawa prison.
129	11	"Kuleana" "One's Personal Sense of Responsibility"	Sylvain White	David Wolkove	January 8, 2016	611	9.41
Flashbacks reveal Kamekona's (Taylor Wily) past as a drug pusher for a local gang, and his first encounter with Chin, ultimately becoming his confidential informant to help arrest the gang. In the present, one of those members is found dead as another, Levi Sosa (Maurice Compte) is released from prison. Chin, Kono and Lou ask Kamekona to go undercover to find out who the killer is. Meanwhile, McGarrett and Danny go to Maui where McGarrett realizes he accidentally signed them up for couples' counseling. Adam receives an unexpected visit from Gabriel Waincroft while he is in prison.
130	12	"Ua ola loko i ke aloha" "Love Gives Life Within"	Maja Vrvilo	Story by : Steve Douglas-Craig; Teleplay by : John Dove & Eric Guggenheim	January 15, 2016	612	9.48
A teenager is shot while on a camping trip, which leads Five-0 to investigate the theft of old unstable Japanese World War II bombs stolen from a hidden bunker. Meanwhile, McGarrett's Aunt Deb (Carol Burnett) comes back to Hawaii after her husband Leonard passes away and reveals she is close to death and has a list to do before she dies. Also, Chin and Inspector Dunn take their romance to the next level.
131	13	"Umia Ka Hanu" "Hold The Breath"	Stephen Herek	Peter M. Lenkov & Eric Guggenheim	January 22, 2016	613	10.07
Lou travels to Chicago to try to get his ex-partner Clay Maxwell (guest star Mykelti Williamson) to confess to killing his wife. Meanwhile while trying to win a bet with McGarrett and Danny, Kono and Chin are held hostage by two gunmen who are trying to bury a body of a fellow police officer.
132	14	"Hoa 'inea" "Misery Loves Company"	Peter Weller	Matt Wheeler	February 12, 2016	614	8.88
Launa Cruz is shot, and Five-0 later find a connection between her, another woman named Natelie Jacobs and Jack Cruz, Launa's husband. As Five-0 continue their investigation, they share sides of unlucky experiences during Valentine's Day period. On February 16, on Stakeout day; the team finally gets Danny to tell his Valentine's story that involved Melissa. Following the case, the rest of the Five-0 teams makes McGarrett tell his Valentine's story. Jerry gets his first date; Lou and his wife Renee get a dinner made by Chef and McGarrett is revealed to delete Catherine from his phone contacts. Kono is left watching footage from her wedding with Adam, but still holds a smile. Chin gets a call from Abby, who apologizes for her behavior that ruined their Valentine's Day. Despite her saying she is in San Francisco, she is revealed to be sitting in a car on a mountain top in the outskirts of Oahu.
133	15	"Ke Koa Lokomaika'i" "The Good Soldier"	Bryan Spicer	Carmen Pilar Golden & Sue Palmer	February 19, 2016	615	8.86
Five-0 teams up with a man named Neil Palea (Joe Egender) who has autism holds clues to the murder of his friend. They later find out the case is related to an attempted bank robbery with the thieves being hunted and executed by Chin's brother-in-law, Gabriel Waincroft. Chin and Gabriel have a fight, culminating in Chin throwing Gabriel out of a window three stories to the roof of a car. However, Gabriel still manages to escape before Five-0 can arrest him. Meanwhile, Danny and his mother, Clara, (Melanie Griffith) are questioned by the FBI about Matty, but Danny deduces that it was all a ruse to get Danny to admit that the team uses Five-0 resources for illegal purposes. Danny leaves in disgust, and it is revealed that Abby is an FBI agent who is there to arrest Five-0 the next time they cross the line.
134	16	"Ka Pohaku Kihi Pa'a" "The Solid Cornerstone"	Jerry Levine	Story by : Peter M. Lenkov; Teleplay by : Steven Lilien & Bryan Wynbrandt	February 26, 2016	616	8.30
Five-0's confidential informant Sang Min (Will Yun Lee) is accused of murdering one of his criminal partners. Sang Min reveals that he was set up when the police arrived. McGarrett seeks the help from his old friend Odell Martin (guest star Michael Imperioli) to help defend Sang Min from the charges because he believes that he's innocent. Elsewhere, Danny travels to New Jersey with his mother Clara to retrieve the money that Danny's brother stole before he was killed and bring it to the FBI.
135	17	"Waiwai" "Assets"	Maja Vrvilo	Eric Guggenheim	March 11, 2016	617	7.97
Five-0 investigates the murders of two hospital surgeons and the patient they were about to operate on. They determine that the patient was the real target as Max shows them X-Rays where a small object was embedded in his skin recently. The vic was actually a mule, carrying a flash drive with NSA intel to Hong Kong for someone else. Meanwhile, Danny returns from New Jersey and informs the rest of the team that the man after them is Robert Coughlin (Ingo Rademacher), Rex Coughlin's brother. Chin and Grover relate Rex's history to Abby: that he tried to bring Chin down on anything and even struck a deal with Gabriel Waincroft to do it. They believe that Robert is after them because of Rex's death. Abby informs Robert that she doesn't think Five-0 is corrupt, but she is told to get something on Five-0 and stay undercover or she'll be fired. At the end of the episode, Abby confesses to Chin that she is a snitch and what kind of a traitor and double agent she is.
136	18	"Kanaka Hahai" "The Hunter"	Eagle Egilsson	Story by : Travis Donnelly; Teleplay by : Matt Wheeler	April 1, 2016	618	8.45
Danny's day off with Grace and Charlie starts off bad when Grace is unhappy about being without her phone, but it quickly gets worse when the camaro is stolen. Meanwhile, the team investigates the death of a man found floating in the sea with his friend. Five-0 determines that the men were slaves aboard a fishing vessel. Meanwhile, in the aftermath of her confession, Abby leaves SFPD and McGarrett offers her an extended stay on the Five-0 task force, an invitation that Abby accepts, pleasing Chin.
137	19	"Malama ka Po'e" "Care For One's People"	Brad Tanenbaum	Ken Solarz & Bill Haynes	April 8, 2016	619	8.63
Lou is forced to go off the grid when his, and his family's, lives are threatened because of an undercover assignment Lou did for the FBI in the past, which has inevitably caught up with him. McGarrett, Kono and Chin launch an investigation into Lou's disappearance and it's revealed to be a hit organized by Lou's former best friend Clay, currently in prison, as revenge on Lou for having him sent to prison for the murder of his wife. A race against the clock begins to save Lou and his family.
138	20	"Ka Haunaele" "Rampage"	Jerry Levine	Story by : Steven Lilien & Bryan Wynbrandt; Teleplay by : Sean O'Reilly	April 15, 2016	620	8.34
The team investigates a stolen $80 million indestructible suit of armor, developed for the U.S. Army as next-gen combat hardware, which was used to later steal a gun used in a murder committed by a Mafia boss. Meanwhile, Jerry's sister, Isabel (Zuleyka Silver), visits Hawaii under the pretense that she's on the island to visit her big brother, but Jerry later finds out that she stole an elephant from the circus that's currently in town and that she needs his help to get it to a proper sanctuary. Also, Kono grows concerned when she found out that Gabriel Waincroft visited Adam in prison and subsequently offered him a job in expanding his new criminal empire. Adam denies accepting the job, but Kono has her doubts.
139	21	"Ka Pono Ku’oko’a" "The Cost of Freedom"	Peter Weller	John Dove	April 22, 2016	621	8.01
The team are called up on to spearhead a high-profile manhunt for several dangerous criminals who escaped from their transport via chemical explosion and figure out the mastermind behind the hit. One of the convicts who died at the scene was James Hamasaki and one of the escaped is Adam. Shackled together in pairs, Adam and the other five convicts attempt to flee in the jungle. Chin and Jerry discover that Michelle Shioma, daughter of the late Goro, was really targeting Adam, as James and Adam shared a similar appearance. Steve, Danny, Kono, and Grover search for the convicts using the trail Adam left behind. Meanwhile, Steve discovers that another of the deceased is Nahele’s dad.
140	22	"I'ike Ke Ao" "For the World to Know"	Bryan Spicer	David Wolkove	April 29, 2016	622	8.41
Addison Wells (Cassi Thomson), a 22-year-old college student, is kidnapped from the house at which she is babysitting. Five-0 discovers that the abductor hacked into the house's thermostat, baby monitor, laptops, alarm system, and everything else. To crack the case, Steve and Danny recruit their old friend Toast (Martin Starr) who has become a famous multimillionaire for creating the popular phone app "Poopy Penguins". Meanwhile, Kamekona has unveiled his latest enterprise: inter-island booze cruises. With Flippa and Max, the trio set off on the maiden voyage, only to run out of wind, battery power, and food.
141	23	"Pilina Koko" "Blood Ties"	Maja Vrvilo	Eric Guggenheim	May 6, 2016	623	8.56
Vanessa Diaz is found murdered in her home; Five-0 criminal informant/crime scene cleaner Gerard Hirsch (Willie Garson) is attacked when he discovers the house had a safe room and someone jumps out. Kono is sent to watch Hirsch until his attacker is caught. Five-0 learns that the victim had a daughter named Sara that has an uncle in HPD: Chin. When Chin goes to talk to her, he learns that Sara's aunt was Malia, Chin's deceased wife, and that her father is Gabriel Waincroft. Steve and Danny put two and two together and realize that Michelle Shioma is going after Waincroft through his family by killing his wife and kidnapping his daughter. Meanwhile, Kono meets Hirsch's father Leo (Elliott Gould) who asks her to keep Hirsch on the honest path.
142	24	"Pa'a Ka 'ipuka I Ka 'Upena Nananana" "The Entrance Is Stopped with a Spider's Web"	Stephen Herek	Steven Lilien & Bryan Wynbrandt	May 13, 2016	624	8.49
As a meth epidemic sweeps Oahu, Max decides to take the Doctors without Borders opportunity (previously mentioned in I'ike Ke Ao) leaving the ME duties to Dr. Shaw. Meanwhile, Five-0 captures longtime nemesis Gabriel Waincroft, who is badly injured when a drug addict shoots him by accident. As Five-0 attempt to leave, Abby is captured by Michelle Shioma's Yakuza hit squad. Abby later escapes and pleads with her former boss, Robert Coughlin (Ingo Rademacher) to help her track down Shioma's mole in HPD that has been hampering Five-0's efforts to extract Gabriel. Chin and Gabriel separate from the others and make it to an apartment building where Gabriel apologizes for killing Chin's father and asks Chin to take care of Sara. Five-0 gets Gabriel to a hospital, but he goes into cardiac arrest during surgery and dies. Steve, Danny, and the rest of HPD surround Michelle Shioma's house to arrest her, but they discover she took a secret tunnel and disappeared into the wind.
143	25	"O Ke Ali'i Wale No Ka'u Makemake" "My Desire Is Only for the Chief"	Bryan Spicer	Peter M. Lenkov & Matt Wheeler	May 13, 2016	625	8.82
After a chilling meeting with Wo Fat's father in Morocco, Steve returns to battle Hawaii's burgeoning meth epidemic. One of the victims is a friend of Nahele's, so Five-0 returns to the building where they captured Gabriel (in "Pa'a Ka 'ipuka I Ka 'Upena Nananana") to find the source of the meth. Steve and Danny go undercover as drug pilots for Dae Wan (Sung Kang). Midflight, an unknown helicopter attacks the plane and gravely wounds Steve. Danny breaks cover in order to receive instructions on how to land and manages to land the plane on the beach instead of the ocean in order to save Steve. The team learns that Steve ruptured his liver and needs a new one fast. Everyone volunteers, but Danny announces that he and Steve have the same blood type, and offers his liver. Grace, Nahele, Kamekona, Flippa, Max, Jerry, Duke, Pua, Chin, Kono, and Grover wait in the hospital as Steve and Danny undergo the transplant. Later, it is revealed Steve and Danny will make a full recovery. In the end, Steve and Danny are seen arguing about thanks and TV channels.

== Production ==
On May 11, 2015, the series was renewed for a sixth season. Filming began on July 8, 2015, with a traditional Hawaiian blessing.

== Reception ==
=== Ratings ===
No.	Episode	Air date	18–49 rating	Viewers (millions)	Weekly rank	Live+7 18–49	Live+7 viewers (millions)
1	"Mai ho`oni i ka wai lana mâlie"	September 25, 2015	1.0	8.30	N/A	N/A	11.41
2	"Lehu a Lehu"	October 2, 2015	1.1	9.24	#20	1.9	12.51
3	"Ua 'o'oloku ke anu i na mauna"	October 9, 2015	1.1	8.97	#18	N/A	11.77
4	"Ka Papahana Holo Pono"	October 16, 2015	1.1	9.08	#16	N/A	12.02
5	"Ka 'alapahi nui"	October 23, 2015	1.0	8.60	#20	1.7	11.82
6	"Na Pilikua Nui"	October 30, 2015	1.1	8.35	#22	1.8	11.38
7	"Na Kama Hele"	November 6, 2015	1.1	8.85	#17	N/A	11.77
8	"Piko Pau 'iole"	November 13, 2015	1.1	8.47	#20	N/A	11.71
9	"Hana Keaka"	November 20, 2015	1.1	9.10	#16	N/A	12.20
10	"Ka Makau kaa kaua"	December 11, 2015	1.0	8.13	#23	1.8	11.24
11	"Kuleana"	January 8, 2016	1.4	9.41	#11	2.2	12.56
12	"Ua Ola Loko I Ke Aloha"	January 15, 2016	1.3	9.48	#9	2.1	12.51
13	"Umia Ka Hanu"	January 22, 2016	1.4	10.07	#10	2.1	12.99
14	"Hoa 'inea"	February 12, 2016	1.3	8.88	#14	2.1	12.22
15	"Ke Koa Lokomaika'i"	February 19, 2016	1.1	8.86	#9	1.8	11.72
16	"Ka Pohaku Kihi Pa'a"	February 26, 2016	1.1	8.30	#17	1.8	11.27
17	"Waiwai"	March 11, 2016	1.1	7.97	#14	1.8	11.02
18	"Kanaka Hahai"	April 1, 2016	1.1	8.45	#19	1.8	11.39
19	"Malama Ka Po'e"	April 8, 2016	1.1	8.63	#14	1.8	11.51
20	"Ka Haunaele"	April 15, 2016	1.1	8.34	#17	1.8	11.25
21	"Ka Pono Ku’oko’a"	April 22, 2016	1.1	8.01	#18	1.8	10.67
22	"I'Ike Ke Ao"	April 29, 2016	1.1	8.41	#16	N/A	11.19
23	"Pilina Koko"	May 6, 2016	1.1	8.56	#14	1.8	11.36
24	"Pa'a Ka 'ipuka I Ka 'Upena Nananana"	May 13, 2016	1.1	8.49	#12	N/A	10.94
25	"O Ke Ali'i Wale No Ka'u Makemake"	May 13, 2016	1.2	8.82	#11	N/A	10.94
